= The Stallion (custom car) =

Overview
- Production: 2003
- Designer: Chip Foose

Body and chassis
- Body style: 2-door coupe
- Platform: 1934 Ford

Powertrain
- Engine: 6 L (350 cu in) LT4 V8
- Transmission: 4-speed automatic

Dimensions
- Wheelbase: 2,896 mm (114 in)

The Stallion is a customized 1934 Ford 3-window built by Chip Foose for Ron Whiteside. It won the Ridler Award at the 2003 Detroit Autorama.

== Construction details ==
The chassis is custom-made by Larry Sergeff, with a 114 in (2,900 mm) wheelbase, 2 in (51 mm) more than stock.

Andy Wallin built the engine, starting with a 1996 350 cu in (5,700 cc) Corvette LT4 crate engine, with stainless steel headers, built by Steve Greninger, and mufflers from Stainless Steel Specialties. Greninger custom-built a cover for the fuel injection, and Karl Jonasson machined custom valve covers. It is mated to a TH700-R4 automatic transmission, controlled by a 1998 Camaro shifter, connected to rear axle (ratio 3.55:1) by an aluminum driveshaft provided by Empire Driveline. The Jack Mattson radiator uses a Vintage Air fan. The alternator is a 100 amp Powermaster.

The IRS, based on a late-model Corvette, was carved from billet aluminum by Larry Sergeff, who also did the IFS. The shock absorbers are Carrera coilovers, the brakes in Wilwood discs, mated to a master cylinder from a 1994 Corvette. The steering box is from a Fiat. The car rides on a set of Foose's custom-designed polished five-spoke Nitrous Thrust knockoff wheels, one of only two sets to exist (the other used on his AMBR-winner, 0032), as "big'n'little"s: 7 in × 16 in (18 cm × 41 cm) in front, 8 in × 17 in (20 cm × 43 cm) in back, with Nitto tires (195/50 front, 255/50 rear0).

The coupé's body is all steel (the hood sides aluminum). It has been slant-chopped 3 in (7.6 cm) (measured at the windshield posts) and pie-sectioned 4 in (10 cm) (measured at the front fenders), then fitting hidden hinges on the doors, which were lengthened 2 in (5.1 cm) The door mirrors and door handles were shaved, as were all the badges. The stainless steel grille, designed by Foose, was fabricated by Don Fink Metalworks.

Jim Griffin, who also did Grand Master, Snyper, and the Smoothster, built and upholstered The Stallion; assisted by his son, James, he fabricated seats and covered them in two shades of tan leather, while the headliner is suede. The steering wheel is an18 in (46 cm) piece from a 1950 Mercury, resized to 14 in (36 cm). The Panasonic DVD player hides behind a Red Mountain Audio head unit. The dash had an aluminum insert, containing Classic Instruments gauges, while the interior rear view mirror came from Billet Specialties. The air conditioning system was supplied by Vintage Air.

The exterior was painted in Glasurit's Sedona Fire paint by Chris Guinn, with final striping by Dennis Ricklefs.

Foose used Mercury badging throughout, saying the coupé was the kind of car Mercury would have built, had the marque existed at the time.

== History ==
Whiteside purchased the car in 1965 for US$150. It took the better part of two years for Whiteside to get the car road-worthy, before being forced to leave it the hands of his younger brothers, Randy and Steve, when he was drafted. The brothers drag raced the car; when Whiteside returned, he joined them, and the car was raced during 1972-75.

After that, Whiteside parked the car until 1986, when he began rebuilding it, with the aid of Ken Garman and Don Maki (who later went to work with Foose). Over the course of two years, the car was rebuilt.

During this process, Whiteside showed photographs of the project to Boyd Coddington, hoping his shop (Hot Rods by Boyd) could build a Ridler Award winner. It was through Coddington's shop Foose conceived a sister car, a roadster, which ultimately became Impact, after the bankruptcy of Coddington's Boyds Wheels, and the consequent failure of his rod shop.

Foose took over the project, working out of his Orange and later Huntington Beach premises, aided by Roy Schmidt, Brian Fuller, Marcel DeLay (and his sons, Marc and Luc), Dennis Graff, Chris Guinn, Don Maki, Paco Castell, Chris Eddie, Tom Marcotte, Lance Nabors, Larry Sergeff, and Steve Greninger (many of them former Coddington employees).

The car was completed in 2003, in time for the Autorama; Whiteside won the Ridler.

Unlike many show-quality customs, this car is actually driven.

== Sources ==
- Geisert, Eric (July 2003). "Ron Whiteside's Ridler Winner". Street Rodder. pp. 78–82.
