= Impact (custom car) =

Overview
- Manufacturer: Richard Berg
- Model years: 1934
- Designer: Ford

Body and chassis
- Class: Roadster

Impact is a custom-built 1934 Ford roadster built by Richard Berg. It won the 2001 America's Most Beautiful Roadster award.

== History ==
Impact was inspired by Ron Whiteside's 1934 3-window. Whiteside began building his '34 in 1986. He showed pictures to Boyd Coddington, asking Coddington to finish it, hoping to have a Ridler Award-winning project. Chip Foose, who worked for Coddington at the time, also saw the pictures, and conceived a sister car, a '34 roadster, for Betty DiVosta, whose husband Buz owned two other Coddington creations.

Then, as a result of the failure of Boyds Wheels, Coddington's rod shop closed. The unfinished roadster was sold at auction to Berg, who completed it as Impact.

Impact was entered in the 2001 Oakland Roadster Show. It won that year's America's Most Beautiful Roadster award.
