= Ala Kart =

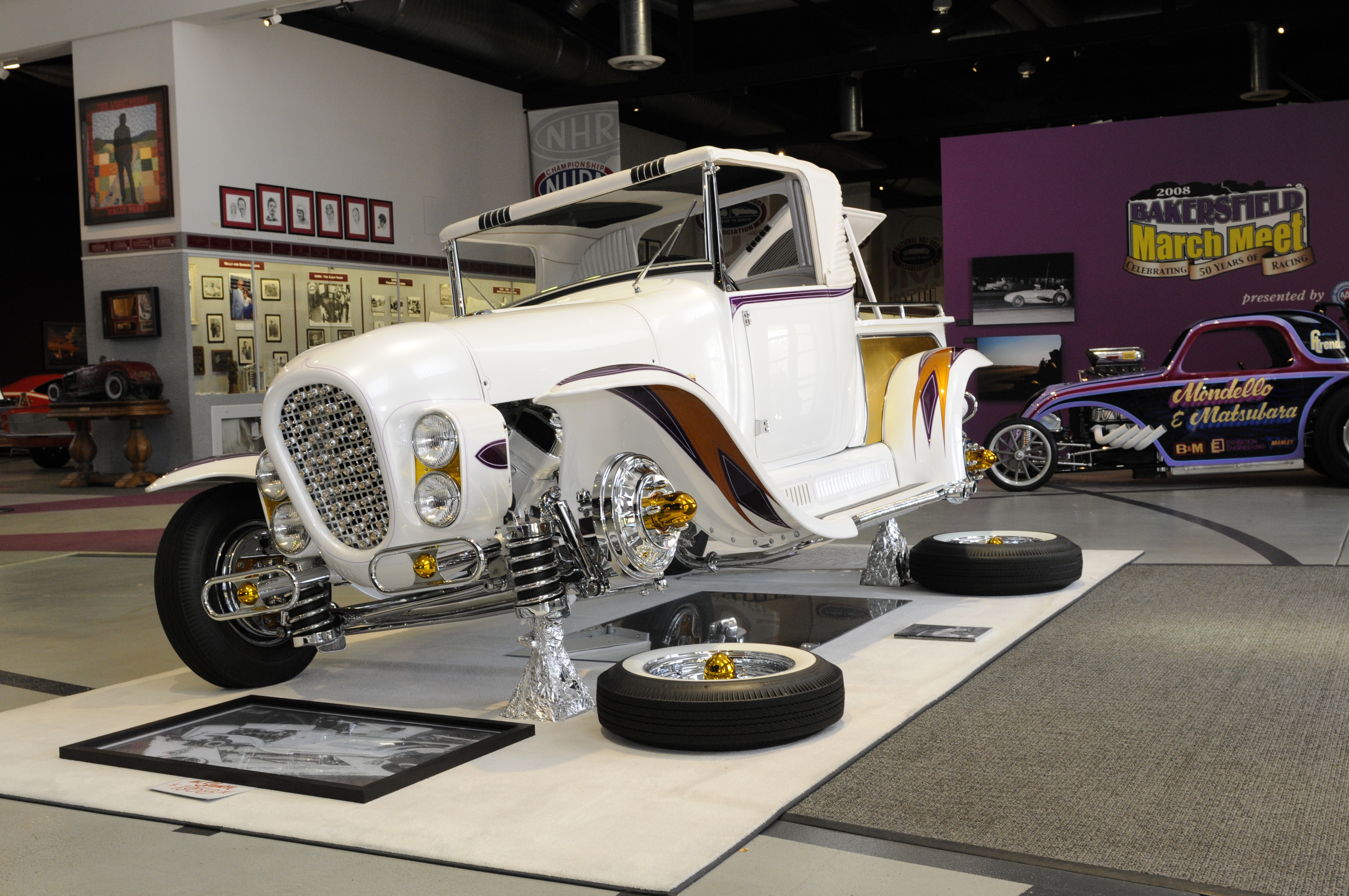
- Ala Kart after restoration at the Wally Park NHRA Motorsports Museum

Overview
- Production: 1957

Body and chassis
- Related: Ford Model A roadster pickup

Ala Kart is a custom car, a customized 1929 Ford Model A roadster pickup, built by George Barris, Richard Peters, and Mike "Blackie" Gejeian in 1957. Originally owned by Peters, it is a two-time winner of the Grand National Roadster Show "America's Most Beautiful Roadster" (AMBR) trophy (1958 and 1959) and Hot Rod cover car in October 1958. Featured in hundreds of car shows, Ala Kart has won more than 200 trophies. It has also made numerous appearances in movies, usually in the background of drive-in shots, and dozens of magazine articles since. It is considered by many to be "one of the most iconic hot rods ever built."

== Origin ==
Ala Kart was begun as a project in 1956, and built during 1956 and 1957. The name was derived from Barris opening a menu. While Peters originally intended only some minor bodywork, like many hot rod and custom car projects, it soon escalated.

Barris sketched out the early design on restaurant napkins.

Ala Kart featured an entirely chromed chassis, including springs, driveshaft, and rear end (following Gejean's previous car's example).

The pickup competed for the AMBR trophy twice, winning both times, but was withdrawn from the 1960 competition.

The truck suffered an engine fire in the 1960s and was rebuilt by the Alexander Brothers, and repainted, not in the original pearl white.

Eventually it was sold into obscurity. It would be sold a couple of times more, resurfacing in the hands of Boyd Coddington, who proposed putting a new frame under it.

Ala Kart was ultimately purchased by John Mumford, who had it restored in 2008 by Junior Conway at Junior's House of Color and Bill Ganahl at Roy Brizio's shop (Brizio Street Rods) for entry in that year's GNRS; it would lose.

Ala Kart is now on display at the Henry Ford Museum in Dearborn, MI.

== Construction details ==
Ala Kart began life as a '29 Ford Model A pickup. The chassis work was done by long-time friends Peters and "Blackie" Gejeian at their Fresno, California shop, with the body and styling by Barris (at Barris Kustoms in Los Angeles). The frame had a new, centrally located crossmember and was completely chromed. The front end was also chromed, including a 4 in (10 cm) dropped axle, coil springs (not the factory leaf springs), split wishbones, Panhard rod, and tube shocks. 1940 Ford drum brakes were used. In back, a 1932 Ford rear axle was fitted, along with specially-fabricated coil springs, Panhard rod, all chromed, and Ford drum brakes. All four corners were equipped with Cadillac airbag suspension pieces.

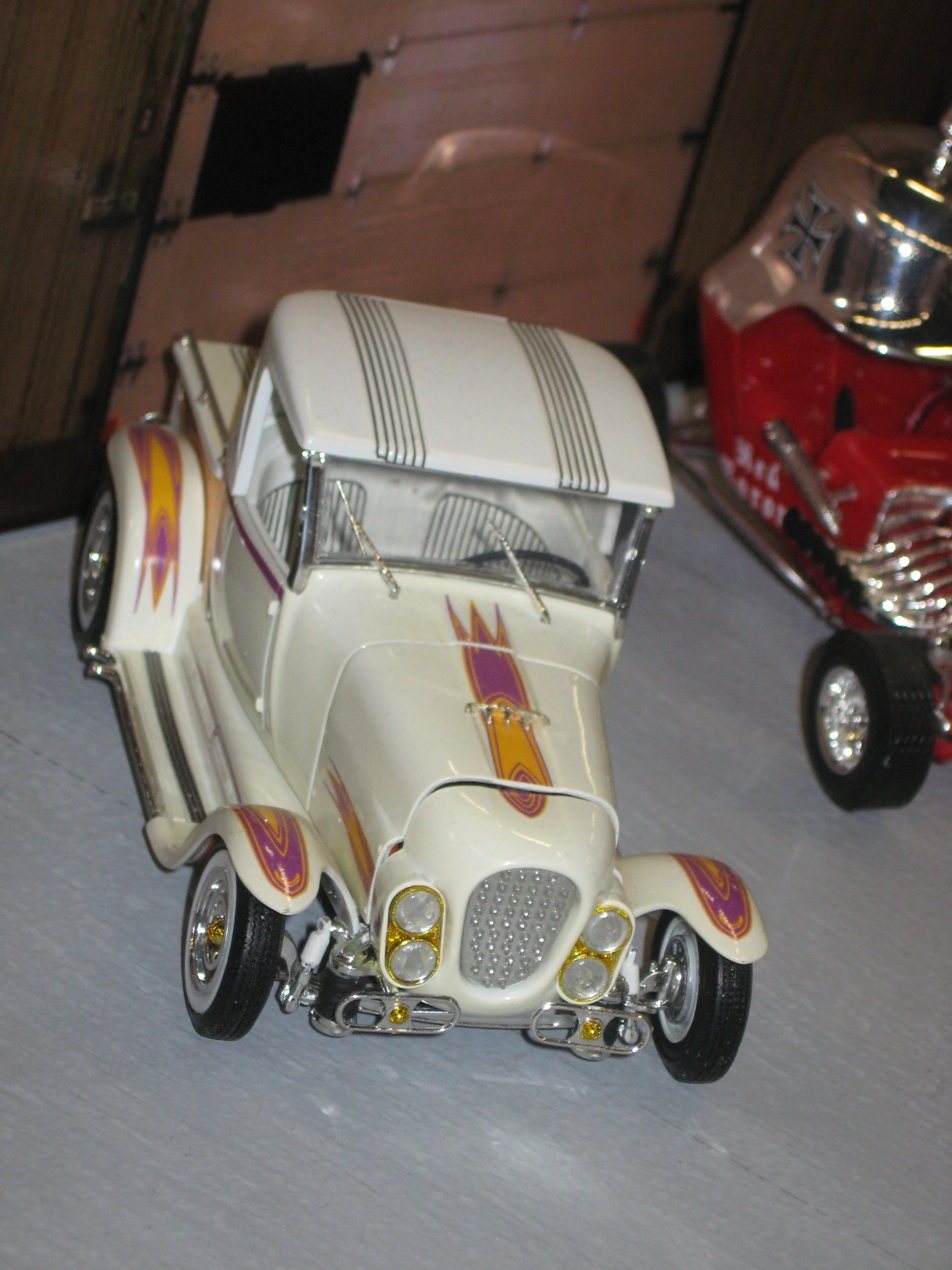
The AMT kit. The hood fit is poor, and the grille rake is not visible, but the chromed lakes pipes are, along the edge of the running board.

The chassis was painted Swedish White Pearl with purple and gold scallops, matching the body. All the chrome work on the underside was done by Gejeian's friend, Bob Martin, at his Fresno shop for free, in exchange for the publicity for Fresno Chrome Plating. Body modifications (except the grille shell, which was aluminum) were done entirely in 20 gauge steel.

The engine was a '54 Dodge 266 cu in (4,360 cc) Red Ram hemi from a Peters' wrecked racing boat. It was outfitted with Isky cam, Hilborn fuel injection, a Scintilla Vertex magneto and Sanderson custom headers. It was mated to a '39 Ford transmission with Zephyr gears through a Cragar adapter. Exhaust was routed through four pipes which passed through the rear roll pan.

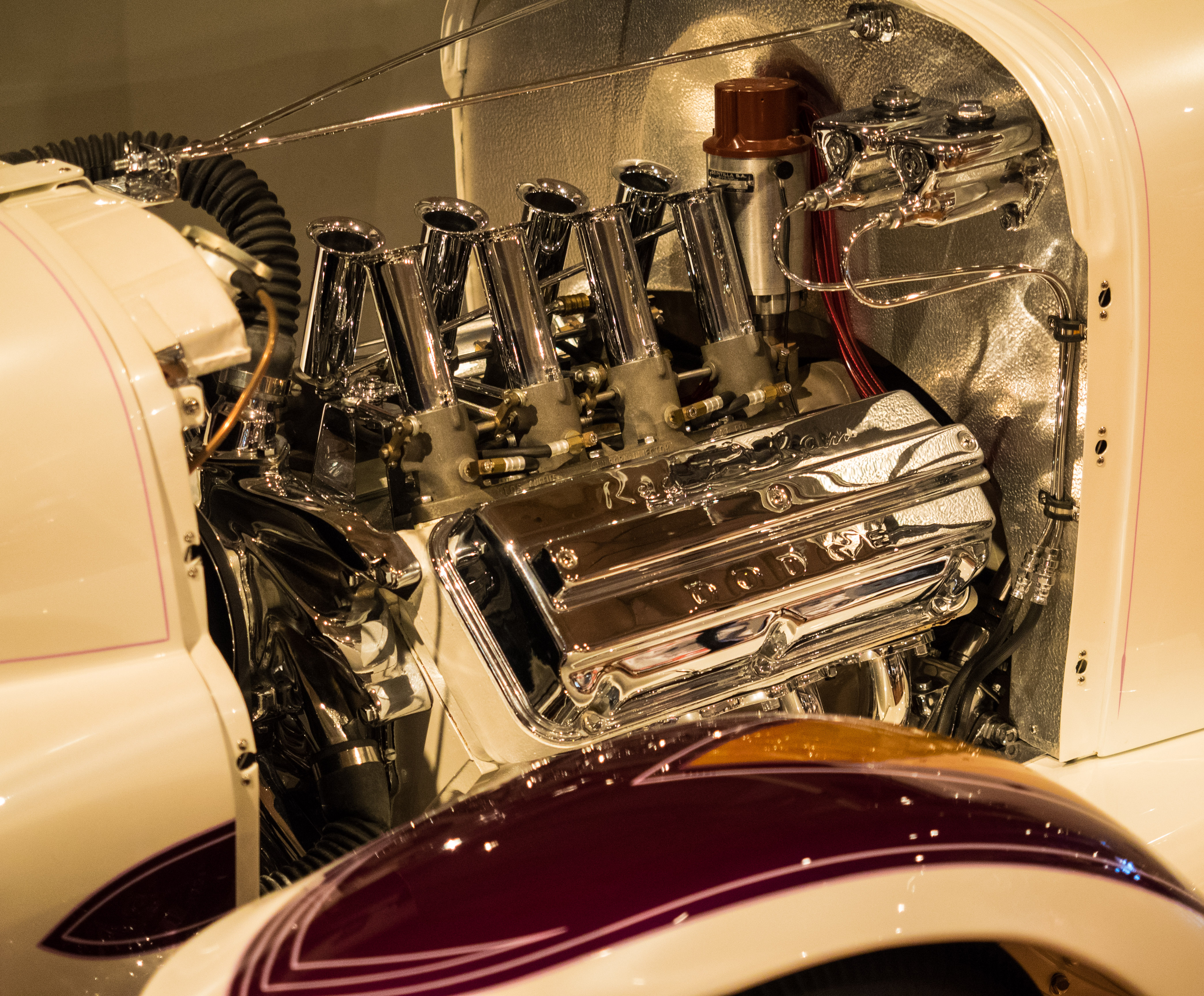
Ala Kart engine view (after restoration)

The '29's body was given a '27 Ford roadster back section. The stock fenders were reshaped, "peaked and bobbed using half-inch round rod". A new grille shell was fabricated from steel and filled with clear plastic tubing; it was given a forward rake. A three-piece hood was created from aluminum, while louvered steel splash aprons were mounted. The bed was built from scratch with steel, with candy gold inserts (found by Barris at a hardware store) and chrome strips. The quadruple headlights, vertically stacked in pairs, were from a '57 Chrysler. The front bumper was a pair of nerf bars. Taillights were '56 DeSoto lenses in '58 Impala bezels, protected by hairpins. Painted overall in Swedish White Pearl, with candy gold scallops, striping was done by master pinstriper Dean Jeffries (early in his career).

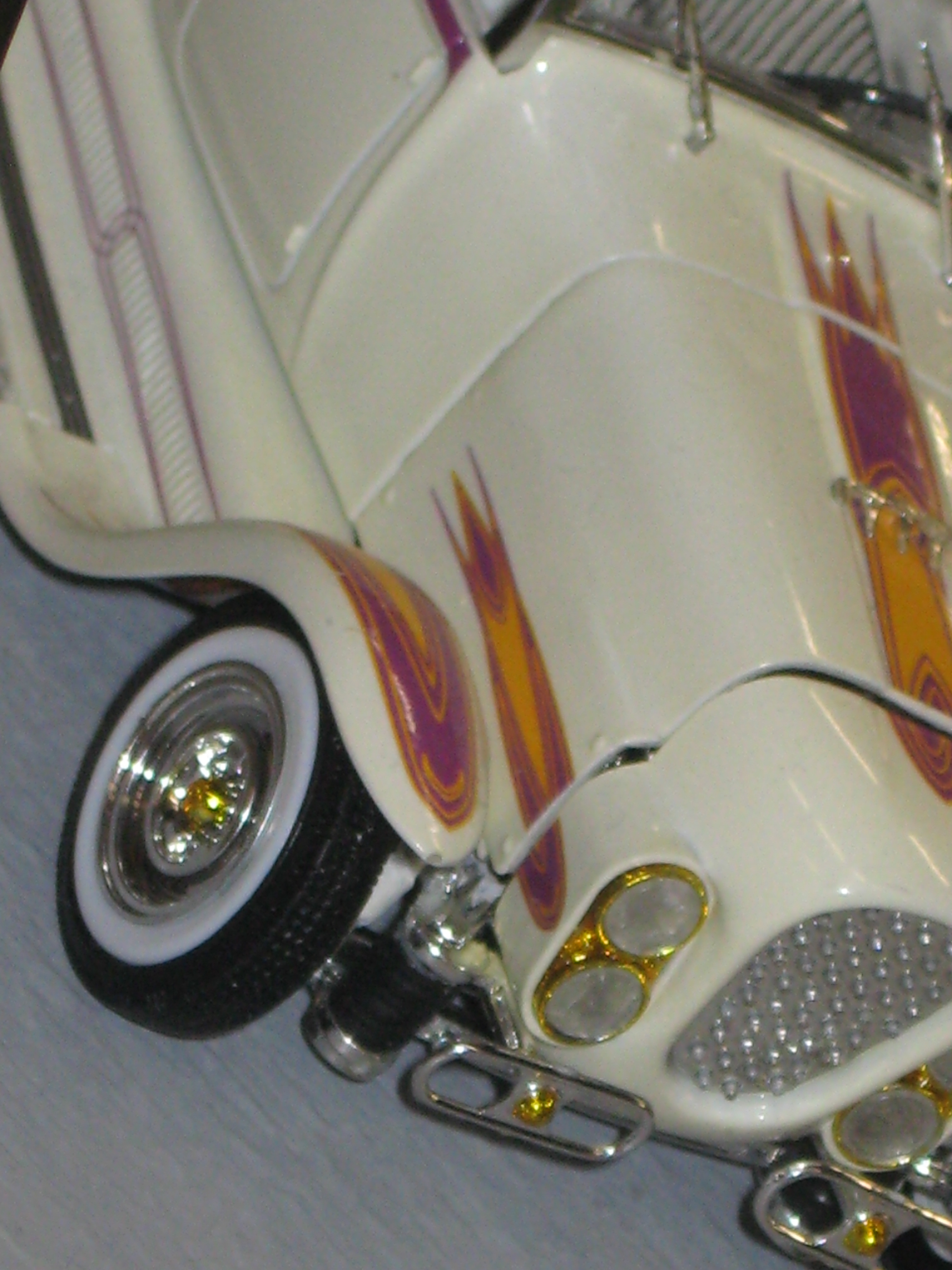
Closeup of the front of the kit. The slant of the headlights here is not apparent in photos of the full-size truck.

Roy Gilbert did the "intricate original upholstery", which was one of Ala Kart's outstanding features. Finished in white pearl Naugahyde fitted with chrome beads, plus black velvet trim inside, the tonneau had a combination of black and white vinyl, set off with gold piping. The gauge cluster came from a '57 Corvette (fitted with Stewart Warner gauges), while the steering wheel was taken from a '57 Lincoln Continental (modified with a gold bullet at the center).

Ala Kart rode on Ford 15-inch (38 cm) centers, trimmed and fitted with reversed 14-inch (36 cm) outer rims, which were then chromed. Center bullets in candy gold were mounted, as were whitewall tires (5.60-14 front, 8.00-14 rear).

== Restoration ==
The 2008 restoration to 100-point status was done by Junior Conway and Bill Ganahl on the exterior at Brizio's, with the interior by long-time Ala Kart Howdy Ledbetter. The restoration was meticulous, even preserving the original scalloping.

That year, Ala Kart would again be entered in the Oakland Roadster Show. It would lose (to Rudy Necoechea's deuce roadster, Undisputed).

== Impact ==
Ala Kart is considered "[o]ne of the coolest full-custom trucks ever built" (a sentiment widely shared among customizers, rodders, and fans of both rods and customs) and "more iconic than all the rest."

== In other media ==
Ala Kart was reproduced as a 1/25 scale model kit by AMT in 1961 becoming one of the best-selling kits in history. It was also reproduced by the Danbury Mint, reissued four times due to demand, plus a Fiftieth Anniversary edition. In addition, it was issued as a Hot Wheels car.

Ala Kart also made numerous film appearances, usually in the background of drive-in shots, before its importance to rodders and customizers was recognized.

== Sources ==
- Hot Rod Magazine online (retrieved 23 June 2015)
- Hot Rod Magazine online (retrieved 23 June 2015)
- Hot Rod Magazine online (retrieved 23 June 2015)
- Hot Rod, 12/86, p. 29 sidebar
