= Don Pilkenton =

American car customizer

Don Pilkenton is a car customizer based in Ohio, United States. He has built three cars to win the Ridler Award, in 1993, 1996 and 1999. He was the first builder to win the award three times.

This car went on to take "America's Most Beautiful Roadster", top prize at the Oakland Roadster Show.

In 2007, Pilkenton's custom shop closed.
