= America's Most Beautiful Roadster =

Motor vehicle award

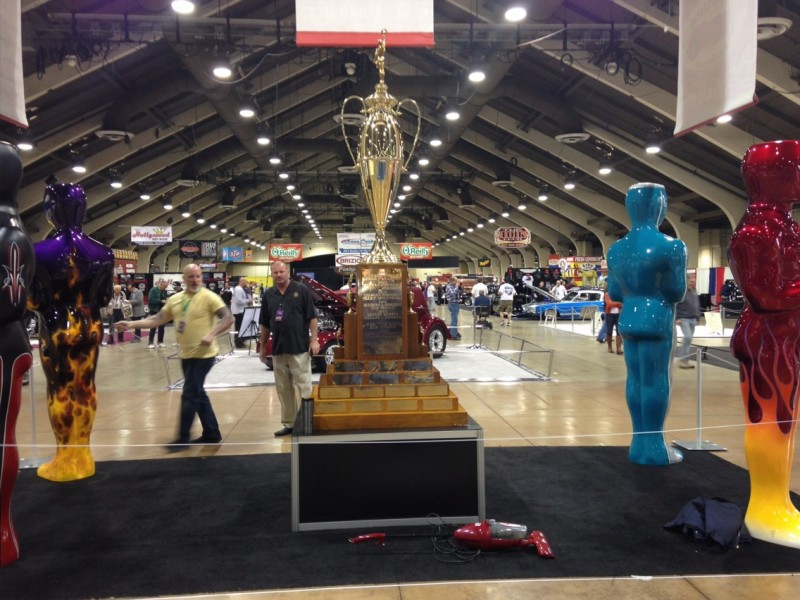

"America's Most Beautiful Roadster" or (AMBR) is an award presented annually at the Grand National Roadster Show. It was created by promoter Al Slonaker to recognize the best roadster in-show. The winner's name is engraved on a 9-foot "mega-trophy" that is maintain by the event's promoter, Rod Shows Inc. At that time of its creation, the AMBR Award trophy was the biggest in the world.

The AMBR is considered among the two "Crown Jewel" awards for professional show car builders in North America, the other being the Detroit Autorama's Don Ridler Memorial Award.

== List of winners ==
Year	Vehicle	Owner	Builder
1950	1929 Ford Roadster	William Niekamp	
1951	1923 Ford Roadster	Rico Squaglia	
1952	1925 Ford Roadster	Bud Crackbon	
1953	1927 Ford Roadster	Dick Williams	
1954	1927 Ford Roadster	Frank Rose	
1955	1927 Ford Roadster (Shishkabob)	Michael Gejeian	
1955	1927 Ford Roadster	Ray Anderegg	
1956	1932 Ford Roadster	Eddie Bosio	
1957	1929 Ford Roadster	Jerry Woodward	
1958	1929 Ford roadster pickup (Ala Kart)	Richard Peters	George Barris
1959	1929 Ford roadster pickup (Ala Kart)	Richard Peters	George Barris
1960	1929 Ford Roadster (The Emperor)	Chuck Kirkorian	
1961	1929 Ford Roadster	Rich Guasco	
1962	1927 T-Roadster (Twister-T)	George Barris	
1963	1927 Ford Roadster (XR-6)	LeRoi "Tex" Smith	
1964	1914 King-T	Don Tognotti	
1965	Custom body (Casper's Ghost)	Carl Casper	
1966	1927 Ford roadster pickup	Don Lokey	
1967	Custom body (Invader)	Bob Reisner	
1968	Custom body (Invader)	Bob Reisner	
1968	Custom Body (Wild Dream)	Joe Wilhelm	
1969	(Alien)	Art Himsl	
1970	1923 Ford roadster pickup (Instant T)	Andy Brizio |	
1971	1923 Ford roadster pickup	Lonnie Gilbertson	
1972	1930 Ford roadster	John Corno	
1973	1923 Ford roadster	Chuck Corsello	
1974	1914 Ford Touring	Jim Vasser	
1975	1923 Ford roadster pickup	Lonnie Gilbertson	
1976	1923 Ford Touring	Bob Sbarbaro	
1977	1923 Ford roadster pickup (Candy Man)	Jim Molino	
1978	1932 Ford Roadster	Phil Cool	
1979	1932 Ford Roadster (Deucari)	Brian Burnett	Magoo
1980	1929 Ford Roadster	John Corno	John Buttera
1981	1932 Ford Roadster	John Siroonian	
1982	1933 Ford Roadster	Jamie Musselman	
1983	1932 Ford Roadster	Chuck Lombardo	
1984	1927 Ford Roadster (California Star)	Don Varner	
1985	1933 Ford Phaeton	Larry & Judi Murray	
1986	1933 Ford Roadster (Mere Image)	Jim McNamara	
1987	1932 Ford Roadster	James Ells	
1988	1932 Ford Roadster (Orange Twist)	Ermie Immerso	
1989	1925 Ford Roadster (Golden Star)	Ermie Immerso	
1990	1932 Ford Roadster (Passion)	Butch Martino	
1991	1925 Ford Roadster (Golden Star)	Ermie Immerso	
1992	1929 Ford Roadster	Dennis Varni	
1993	1932 Ford Roadster (Blu Steel)	Don Raible	
1994	1929 Ford Roadster (Infinity Flyer)	Joe MacPherson	
1995	1937 Ford Roadster (Smoothster')	Fred Warren	
1996	1932 Ford Roadster (Boydster)	Boyd Coddington	Boyd Coddington
1997	1932 Ford Roadster (Youngster)	Bob Young	
1998	1932 Ford Roadster (Revolver)	Dave Emery	
1999	1933 Ford Roadster (Shockwave)	Fred Warren	
2000	1932 Ford Roadster (0032)	Chuck Svatos	Chip Foose
2001	1933 Ford Roadster (Impact)	Richard Berg	
2002	1932 Ford Roadster	Paul Trussell	
2003	1932 Ford Roadster	George Lange	
2004	1936 Ford Roadster	Charlie Lambetecchio	Larry Ruth
2005	1932 Ford Roadster (Sedeuced)	Paul & Erik Hanson	Steve Moal
2006	1936 Ford Roadster (Impression)	Ken Reister	Chip Foose
2007	1936 Ford Roadster (Radster)	Kevin and Karen Alstott	Roger Burman @ Lakeside Rods & Rides
2008	1932 Ford Roadster (Undisputed)	Rudy Necoechea	Scott's Hot Rods and Customs
2009	1932 Ford Roadster	Harry Willet	
2010	1933 Ford Roadster (Possessed)	Mike Dingman	Scott's Hot Rods and Customs
2011	1934 Ford Roadster	Daryl Wolfswinkel	Squeeg's Kustoms
2012	1927 Ford Roadster	Bill Lindig	SO-CAL Speed Shop
2013	1927 Ford Roadster	John Mumford	Roy Brizio Street Rods
2014	1935 Chevy Phaeton	Wes Rydell	Rad Rods By Troy
2015	1933 Ford Roadster	Larry Olson	Bobby Alloway
2016	1932 Ford Roadster	Darryl Hollenbeck	
2017	1936 Packard (Mulholland Speedster)	Bruce Wanta	Hollywood Hot Rods
2018	1931 Ford Roadster	Dave Martin	Scott Bonowski
2019	1936 Ford Roadster	George Poteet	Pinkee's Rod Shop
2020	1932 Muroc Roadster	Monty Belsham	Squeeg's Kustoms
2021*
2022	1934 Chevrolet Roadster	Jeff Breault	Devlin Rod and Custom
2023	1932 Ford Roadster	Jack Chisenhall	
2024	1932 Ford Phaeton	Beth Myers	Roy Brizio Street Rods

*2021 show was cancelled due to the COVID-19 pandemic.

== See also ==
- List of motor vehicle awards
