= Detroit Autorama =

American custom car showcase

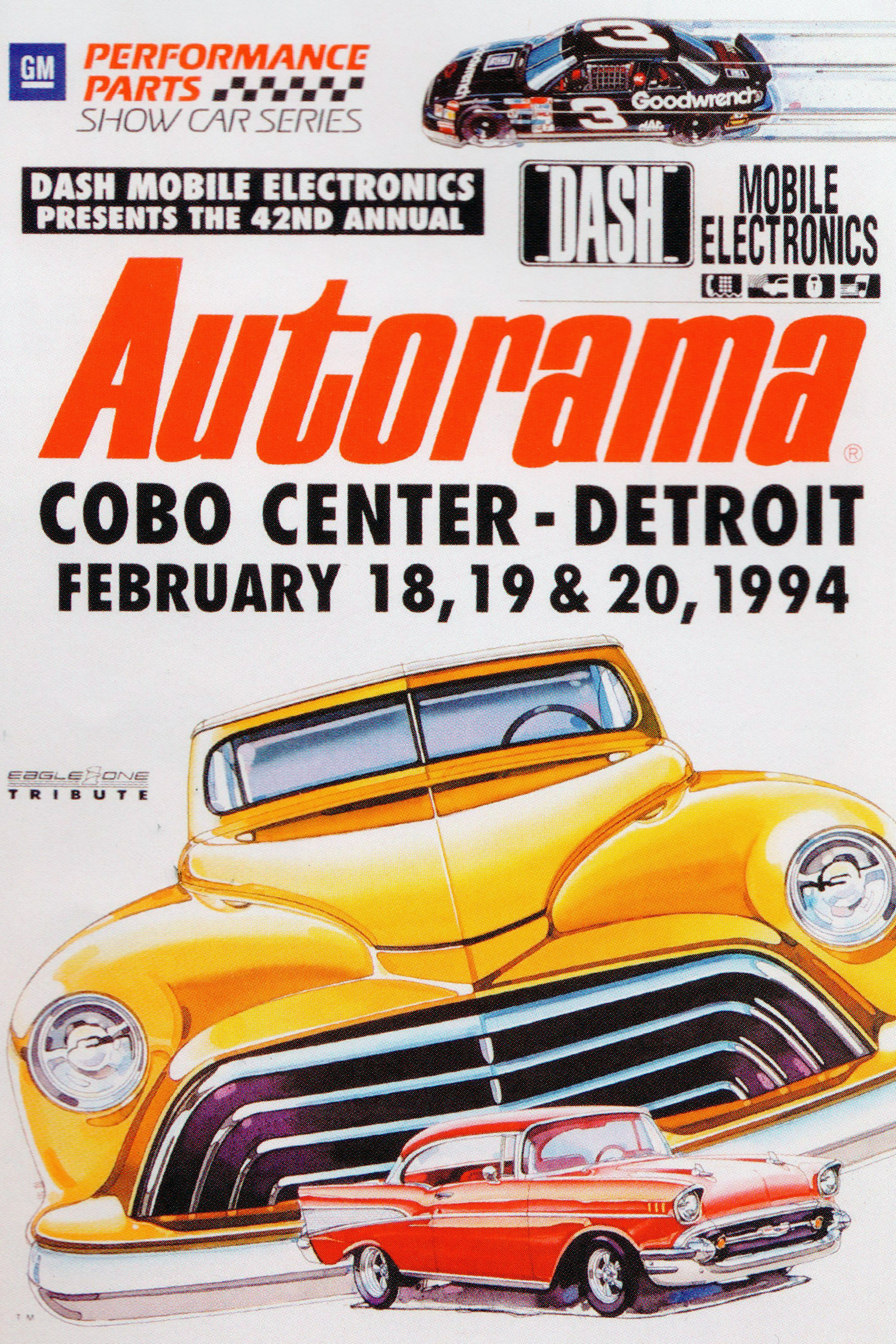
Official poster for the 42nd Annual Detroit Autorama in 1994

The Detroit Autorama, also known as America's Greatest Hot Rod Show, is a showcase of custom cars and hot rods held each year at Huntington Place in Detroit, Michigan, in either late February or early March.

It is promoted by Championship Auto Shows Incorporated (CASI) and hosted by Michigan Hot Rod Association (MHRA). It is part of the International Show Car Association (ISCA) schedule for the Summit Racing Equipment Show Car Series, which includes other prestigious show car events such as the Chicago World of Wheels and Houston Autorama. The show features a selected group of 800 custom and restored vehicles from across the world and more than 140,000 spectators annually.

Detroit's Autorama is best known as home to the Don Ridler Memorial Award, considered the "Nobel Prize of Hot Rodding". It's presented to the "best in show" at each year's event, and has been won by many well-known car designers and builders, such as Chip Foose, Troy Trepanier, Jerry Pennington, and Dave Kindig.

Together, the Detroit Autorama and Ridler Award are considered among the two "Crown Jewel" competitions and awards for professional show car builders in North America, alongside the Grand National Roadster Show and its America's Most Beautiful Roadster (AMBR) Award.

== History ==
The first Detroit Autorama was held at the University of Detroit Memorial Building on January 31 and February 1, 1953. It featured only 40 cars, and was hosted by members of the Michigan Hot Rod Association (MHRA), which was created only a year before to "organize small local clubs into one unified body that could raise the money needed to pull drag racing off the streets and into a safe environment". Eventually, the MHRA grew to also include clubs from the customizing and hot rodding scene, such as the Motor City Modifieds, Bearing Burners and Spark Plugs, who combined efforts to pull-off the first event, along with other Detroit car clubs such as The Road Knights, Shifters, and Milwinders.

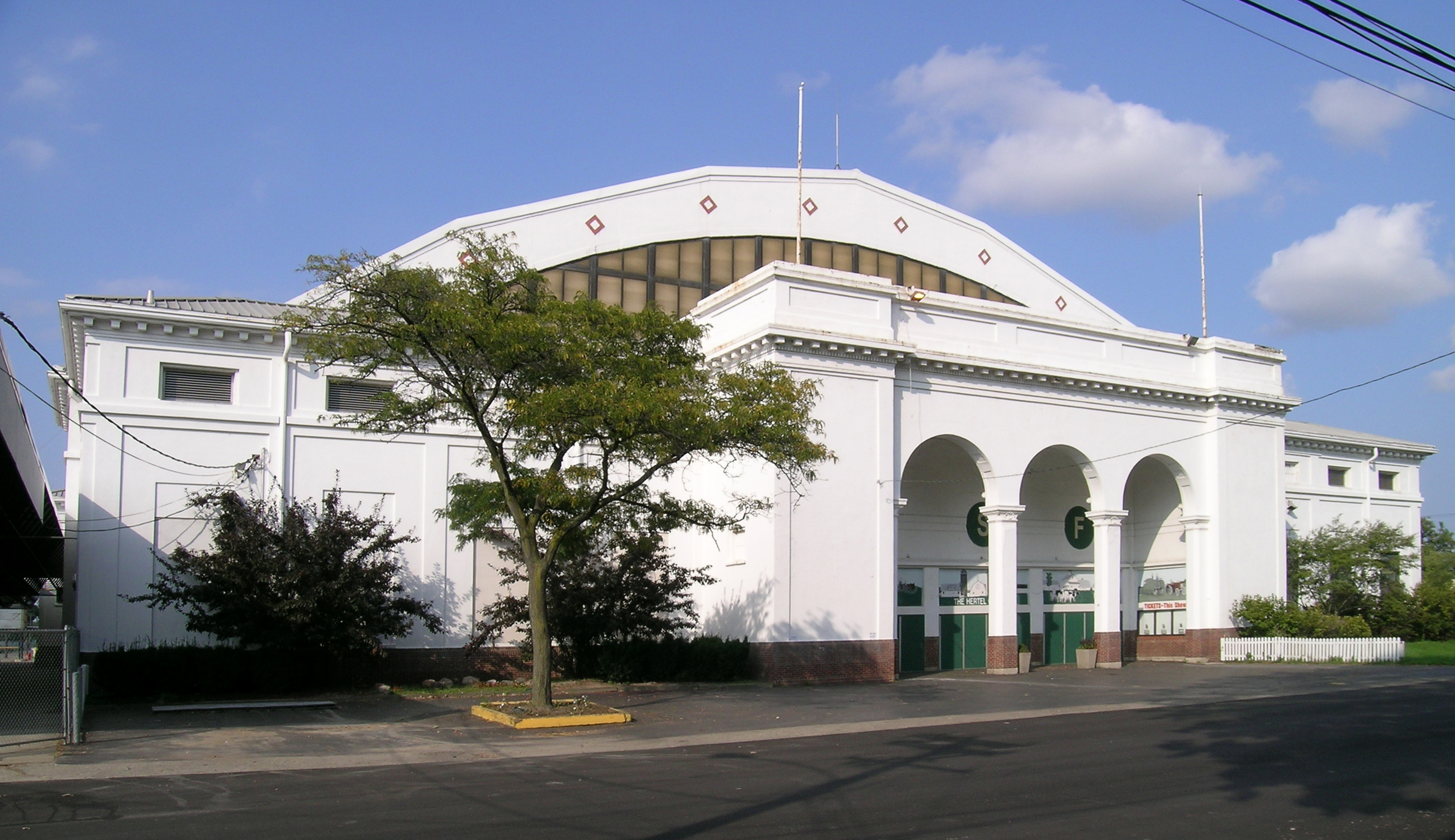
The Michigan State Fairgrounds Coliseum was home to Autorama from 1954 to 1960.

For the second show, activities were moved to the Michigan State Fairgrounds, where it was held from 1954 to 1960. For the fourth event in 1956, the MHRA hired a local band and sporting-event promoter Don Ridler to help the show reach a broader audience. Ridler served as the show's first true promoter until his death in 1963. The following year, the MHRA created a "best in show" award for Autorama, named after the man who made the biggest impact on the show during its infancy.

With increased membership and the success of the first four shows, the MHRA had the necessary capital to build its dragstrip. Motor City Dragway, located in Fair Haven, Michigan, opened in 1957 as the first dragstrip in Metro Detroit. The MHRA would continue to manage both the Detroit Autorama and Motor City Dragway until the track's closure in 1978.

The 9th Annual Detroit Autorama was the first to be held at the new Cobo Hall. That year featured a new-record 230 cars competing, and filled all 10,000 sq ft (930 m^{2}) of Cobo's lower-level basement. The 1961 show's last day also broke the event attendance record by drawing a crowd of approximately 35,000 people. During these early years at Cobo, the event began to attract industry names from outside the Motor City, including George Barris, Darryl Starbird, Carl Casper, and "Big Daddy" Ed Roth. And as part of Ford Motor Company's "Ford Custom Car Caravan", the show also generated attention from other big name customizers, including Bill Cushenbery, Jack Florence, Dean Jeffries, and Gene Winfield.

In 1964, the MHRA created the Don Ridler Memorial Award to recognize the most "outstanding car shown for the first time ever". The inaugural Ridler Award went to Macomb's Al Bergler, with an Alcohol slingshot dragster.

Following Bergler's win in 1964, the next ten years saw growth both in the number of exhibitors, as well as the number of professional custom car builders competing for the show's new top prize. Early Ridler-winning entries included vehicles built by Larry and Mike Alexander, Jerry Pennington, and George Busti.

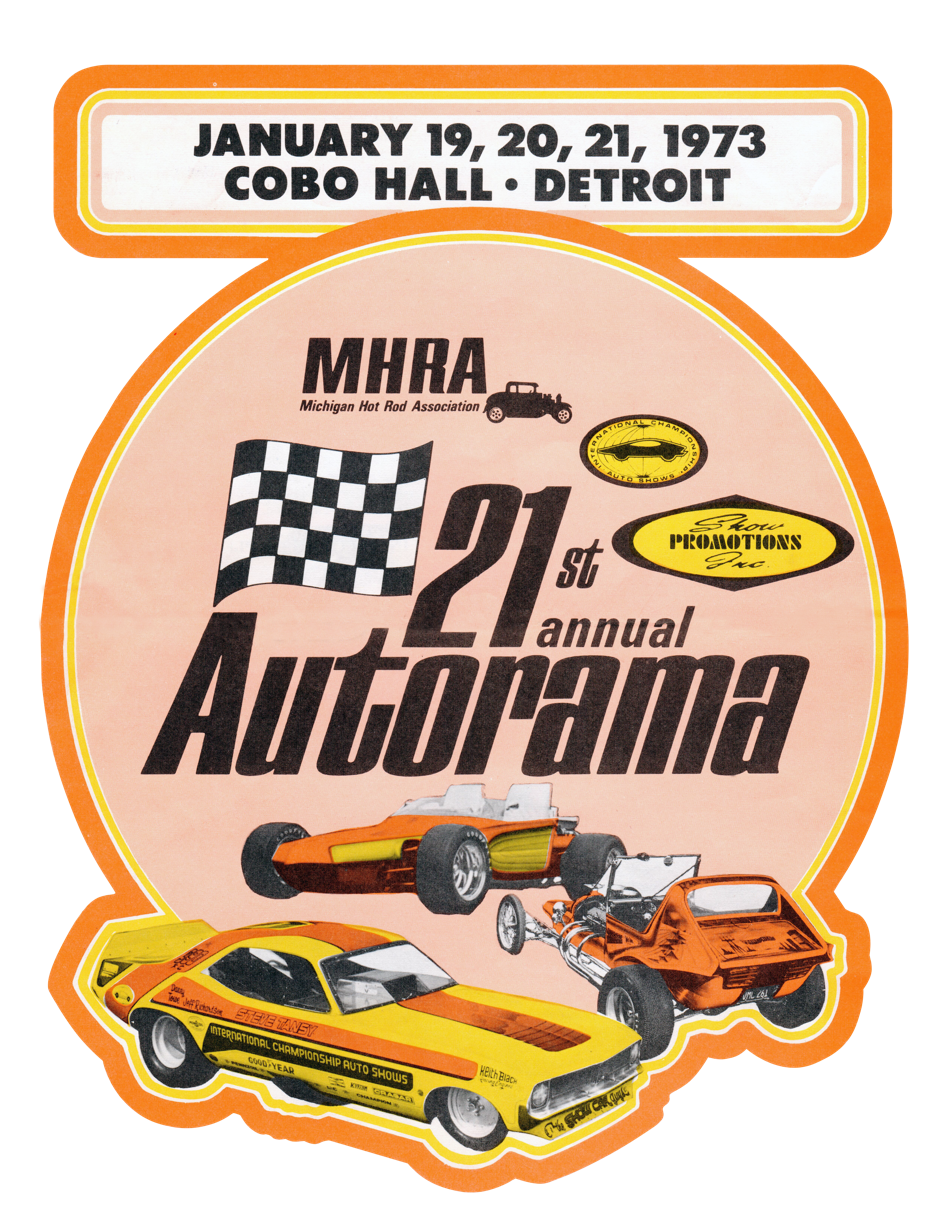
Artwork for the 21st Annual Autorama, held the weekend of January 20, 1973

Starting in the early 70s, the MHRA began to incorporate other exhibitions and attractions to Autorama. This included Soap Box Derbies, an MPC Model Car Contest, and the Miss Autorama Contest. The show also began incorporating live acts. Celebrities including Wolf Man Jack, Adam West, Mark Hamill, and Lou Ferringo all made autograph appearances at Autorama during the 70's. Bob Seger performed at three Autoramas in the early 70's. Mitch Ryder, Alice Cooper, Bo Diddley, and Chubby Checker also performed during show weekends in the 1970s.

Builder Jerry Pennington's rear-engine Corvette (Scorpion) and hand-built custom street rod (Devilfish) with their velvet interiors and sharp body lines rank among the most over-the-top and iconic Ridler cars ever built. 1974's event was a first for Autorama, as Wimauma, Florida's Don Campbell and his '27 Ford became the first out-of-state entry to capture the Ridler Award. The decade was then capped-off with a series of six Ford T-bucket Ridler winners. The roadster trend continued throughout the 1980s, with nine of the next ten Ridler winners being '29 through '34 Fords. The first non-roadster to win the Ridler since 1973 was Dale Hunt's late-model Pro Stock Pontiac Grand Am at the 34th annual Detroit Autorama in 1986. Hunt's Grand Am remains one of only two Pro Stock cars to have won the Ridler (the other being Bob Rizzoli's '92 Mercedes 560 SEC).

Throughout the 1980s and 90s, the Autorama continued to grow into one of the most prestigious car shows in the country. Fueling growth was a next generation of professional builders and renowned car owners who began to make their way to Cobo every winter in hopes of capturing the Ridler. Among this next generation were California's Bobby Alloway and Boyd Coddington, Memphis' George Poteet, Ohio's Don Pilkenton, and others. With the influx of new talent in custom car building, the show started to gain national press, with annual coverage in Hot Rod and Street Rodder magazines. The only downside to the growing national attention was felt by local Michigan entries. As exhibitors started traveling from across the country, many local Detroit and Michigan customizers became less competitive against those from out-of-state. Though the Alexander Brothers and others continued to build local cars for the show (including a Great-8 competitor in 2012), as of 2023, Dave Emery's 1997-winning Ford Roadster ( Revolver) was the last Michigan-built entry to capture the Ridler.

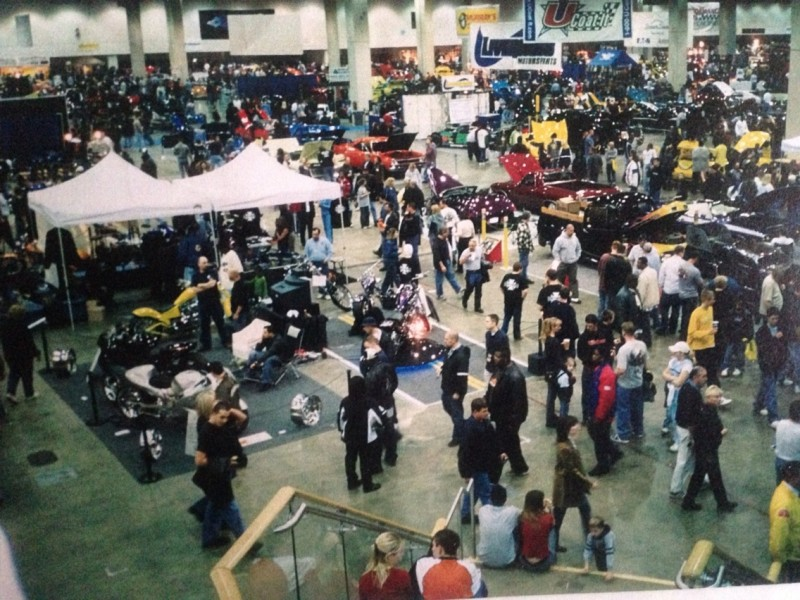
Example of the turnout for the 52nd Annual Autorama in 2004

The new millennium brought a freshly redesigned Ridler Award trophy, and the creation of the "Great 8" finalist. It also brought a third generation of professional car builders. Wes Rydell's '35 Chevy Grand Master became the first built by designer and TV personality Chip Foose to win the award in 2002. Foose returned again the following year with a '34 Ford, Stallion, for Arizona's Ron Whiteside, which made him only the third builder in the show's history, and the first since Jerry Pennington, to win the award two consecutive years.

Foose returned again in 2005 with a '36 Ford (Impression), built for Littleton, Colorado's Ken Reister. It was with Impression Foose set a record, joining Don Pilkenton as only builders to win three Ridler Awards, with Foose being the quickest to accomplish that feat in only a four-year span. Foose would snap his own record yet again ten years later, when his '65 Chevy Impala (Imposter, built for Don and Elma Voth) captured his unprecedented fourth Ridler in 2015.

Following the success of Foose Designs, most Ridler contenders transitioned from individual to professional builds. Ross and Beth Myer's '36 Ford (First Love) was the first Ridler-winner to be built by "Rad Rides By Troy" (Trepanier). The transition to professional builders continued with T&T Customs (2010), Torq'd Design Lab (2012), Cal Customs (2013), Super Rides By Jordan (2019), and Pro Comp Shop (2022 and '23).

Since 2008, the roadster trend has begun to fade with only six of the last fifteen Ridler winners being pre-'39 Roadsters. Most Great 8 Contenders and Ridler winners today are professionally build for clients, with J.F Launier's '64 Buick Riviera as the only owner/builder to capture the award since 1998.

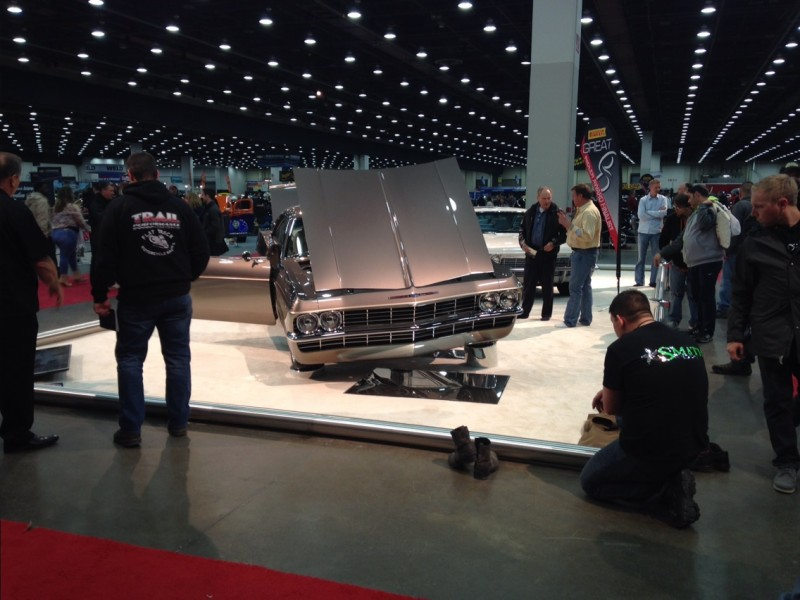
Designer/Builder Chip Foose stands by his 2015 Ridler Winning '65 Impala Imposter during the first night of the 63rd Annual Detroit Autorama.

In 2002, the Detroit Autorama celebrated its 50th anniversary with special promotions from Murray's Auto Parts, and inducted an honorary list of "50 People Who Made a Difference". A hall of fame, entitled "The Autorama: Circle of Champions", was also introduced and has inducted at least one member every year since 1997. Inductees include George Barris (1999), Ed Roth (2000), Crain Communications' Keith Crain (2003), Street Rodder's Brian Brennan (2010), Chip Foose (2013), and Hurst Shifter girl Linda Vaughn (2014). Autorama also introduced for their 50th anniversary a special "Builder of the Year" award to honor past Ridler-winning or major show contributors. Past "Builders of the Year" include the Alexander Brothers (2002), Blackie Gejeian (2004), Ed Roth (2006), So-Cal Speed Shop (2007), Gene Winfield (2008), Darryl Starbird (2009), Bobby Alloway (2011), and Troy Trepanier (2014).

To celebrate the 50th anniversary of the Ridler Award in 2013, the 61st annual Detroit Autorama "Builder of the Year" exhibit was replaced with the largest gathering of former Ridler-winning cars ever assembled. To cap-off the celebration, the winners of the 50th Ridler Award (Rob & Deb Cizek & their 1940 Ford "Checkered Past") were presented with the first-ever Gold Ridler Award.

During the 2010s and '20's, recognition for the Detroit Autorama among car builders has continued to grow, with contenders traveling as far as Western Australian with hopes of capturing the prestigious Ridler Award. The growing recognition also led to an expansion of Autorama EXTREME, a special portion of the show featuring traditional Rat Rods, customs, and other patinaed vehicles. In 2023, the Detroit Autorama celebrated its 70th anniversary with more than 800 vehicle entries, over 240 different class awards, and an estimated 149,000 visitors through the weekend.

Out of shared competition and history, the Detroit Autorama has become one of the two "Crown Jewels" of professional show car competitions, often sharing cars and builders with the other "Jewel", the Grand National Roadster Show. Both Autorama's Ridler Award and the GNRS' "America's Most Beautiful Roadster" Award have been awarded annually for over 50 years, both are presented to vehicles being shown for the first time, and both have been won by the likes of Foose, Trepanier, and Alloway.

== Championship Auto Shows Inc. ==
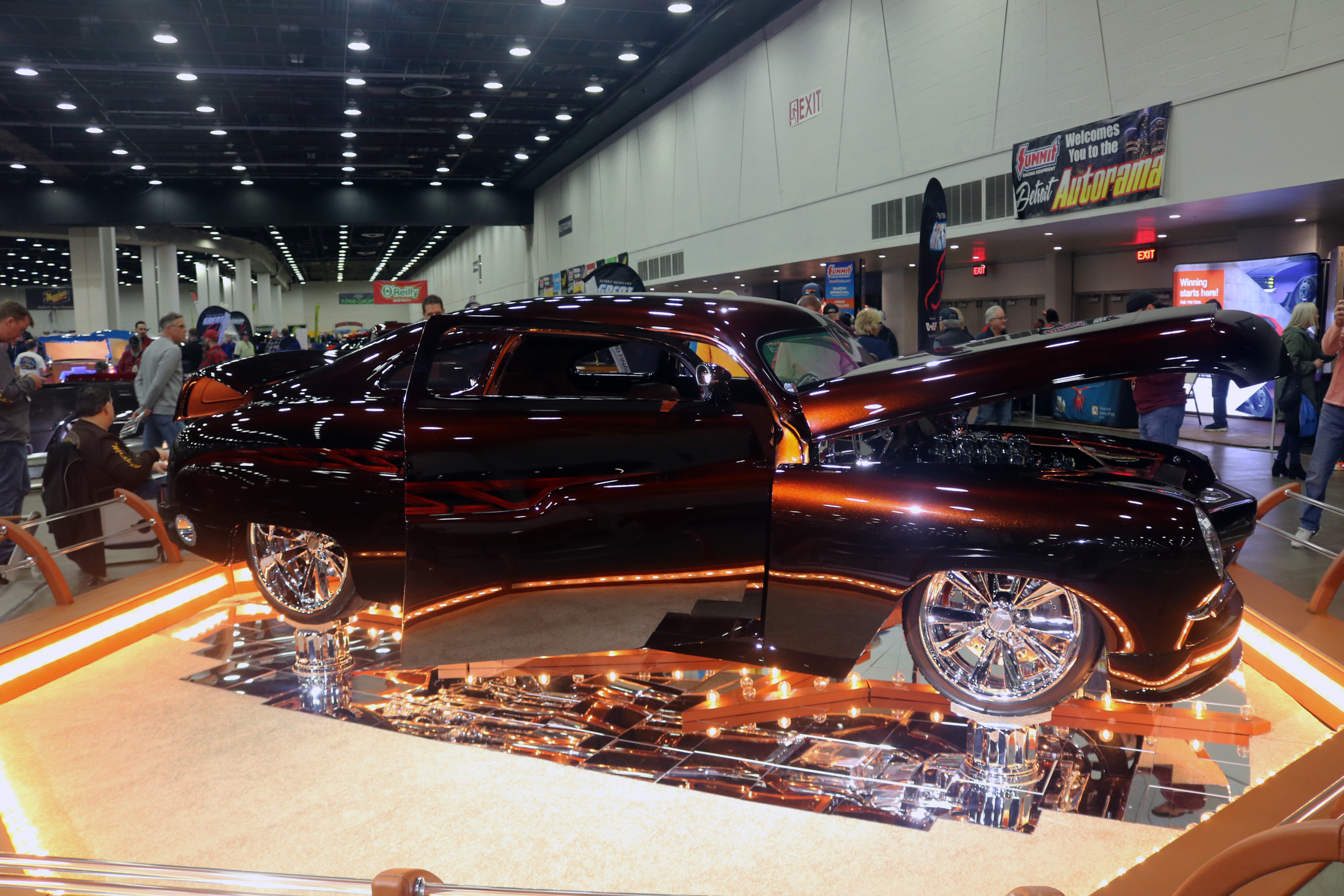
This 1950 Mercury called Maximus was the second consecutive Ridler winner professionally built by Pro Comp Customs.

The Detroit Autorama has been organized in-collaboration between the Michigan Hot Rod Association (MHRA) and Championship Auto Shows (CASI) since 1961. In 1963, CASI President Bob Larivee Sr. and fellow CASI showrunners formed a new governing body for indoor show car events, titled the International Show Car Association (ISCA). The ISCA has since become the leading governing body of show car events and competitions in North America, with its own rulebook, classification, and points system. Along with CASI (now "North America's largest producer of indoor hot rod shows") they co-promote and judge events from coast-to-coast.

The most events ever on an ISCA schedule was 99, set during the 1982–83 season. The current schedule features 21 long-running indoor events under the "Autorama" and "World of Wheels" banner, including those in Detroit, Chicago, Indianapolis, Pittsburg, Houston, and the ISCA Championship Finals, which are currently held in Cincinnati. CASI and ISCA combine to promote and judge shows in sixteen states and four provinces, with events running from Thanksgiving weekend through mid-April.

All ISCA events have a series of "Outstanding Awards" for more than three-dozen classes. Each one counts as a single point in the ISCA standings, which is split into four overall classes: Rod, Custom, Truck, and Bike. If at the end of a season, a single contributor has four Outstanding Awards in a single category, they are locked-into the ISCA Championship Finals. Many Ridler Winners and Great-8 cars have gone-on to tour the CASI/ISCA event circuit to win an overall Class Championship.

== Ridler Award ==
Autorama's "best in show" award is the Don Ridler Memorial Award, named after Don Ridler, a former Michigan State Football Player, Lawrence Tech Basketball and Football Coach and athletic director, and Autorama's first promoter from 1956 to 1963.

It was presented for the first time at the 12th annual Autorama in 1964, and has been awarded annually since.

== The "Great 8" ==
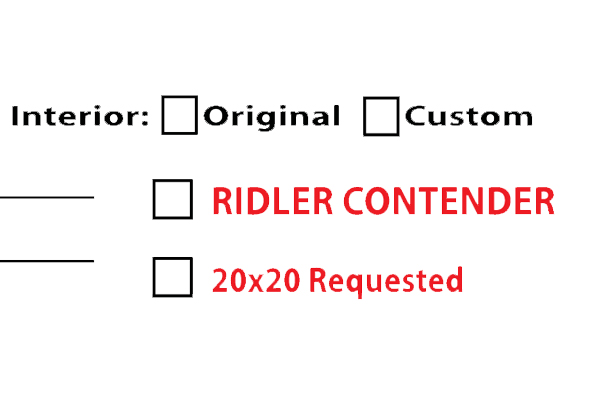
Before even entering competition for the Great 8, an applicant must check the box that says "Ridler Contender", so the promotional staff knows where to both place the car, and set its time for Move-In.

The Ridler Award winner is selected out of a pre-determined group of eight cars, known as "The Great 8".

On the application for Autorama, a box is to be checked to indicate to the promotional staff if the submitted entry is a Ridler contender. Once entered, each vehicle must meet two specific guidelines in order to qualify for the Great 8, and thus, the Ridler. The entered vehicle must be making its public debut with "limited media exposure", and must be in "minimally operable" condition.

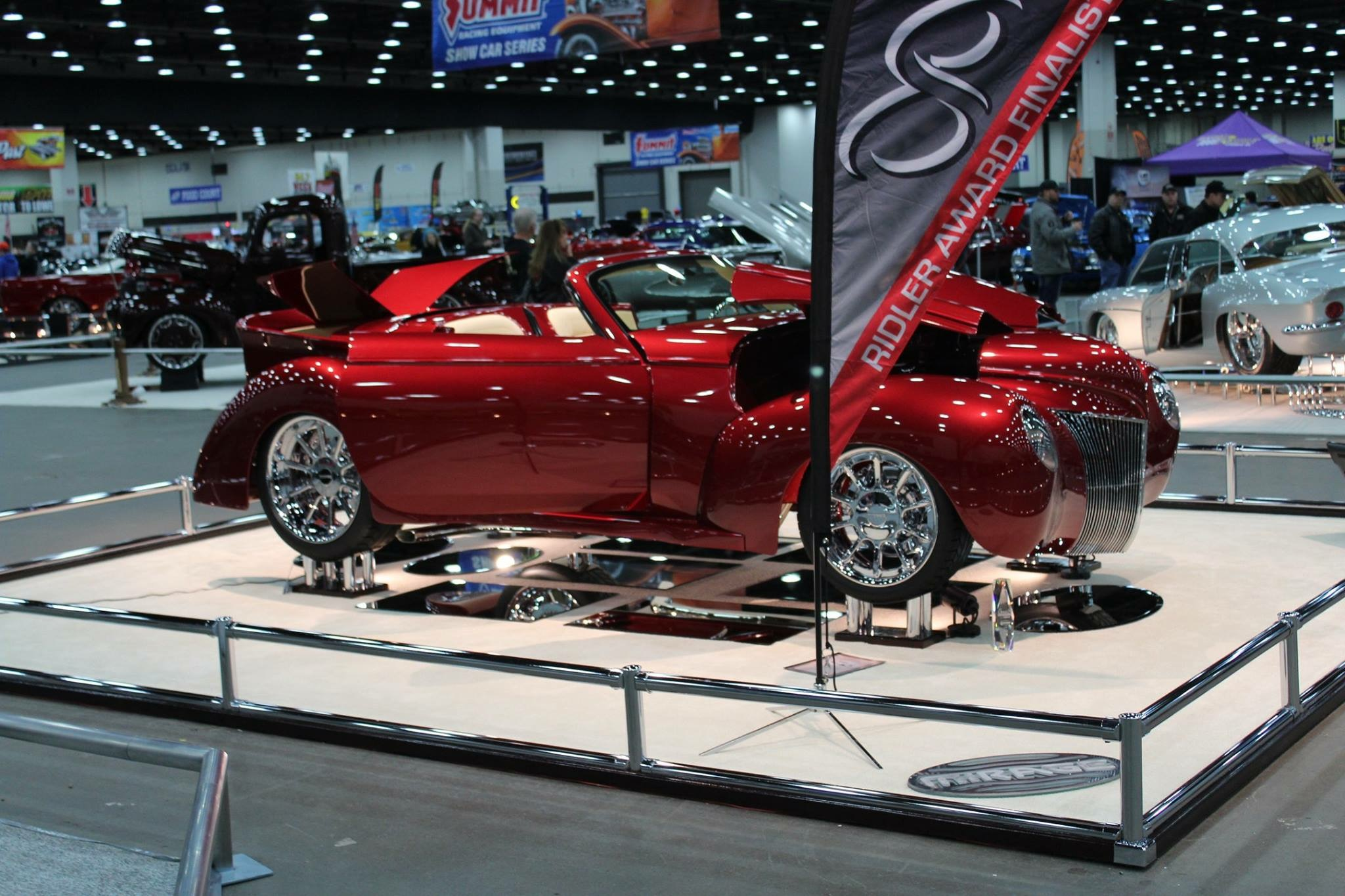
Richard Broyle's customized 1941 Ford Pickup was among the 2016 "Great 8" contenders.

Once a "Contender" vehicle has met those requirements, it inspected by ISCA judges, who then determine the "Great 8" finalist out of the contender pool.

An entire staff of ISCA Judges are assigned solely to the Great 8 cars, and go through each one before deciding on "the best in show". After a decision is made, the winner is announced alongside more than 240 other vehicle classes on Sunday Night.

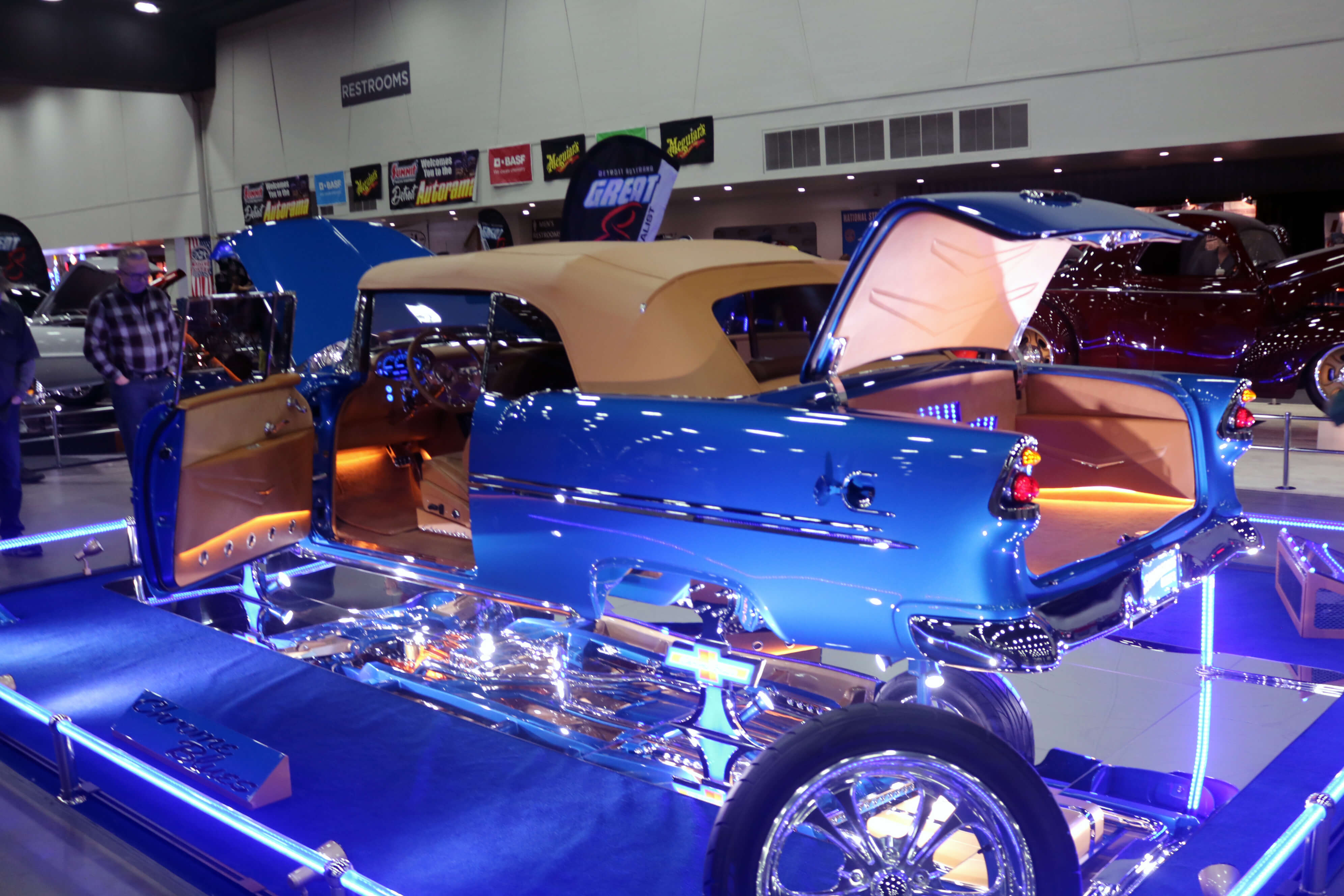
2023 "Great 8" Contender: a 1955 Chevy Convertible owned and built by the Snodgrass Brothers of Melbourne, Florida

The Ridler Award Trophy, designed by Larry Erickson, is presented to the vehicle's owner, who is also given an embroidered jacket and a $10,000 check. Along with receiving a personal Ridler Award, the owner's name is also engraved among the list of past recipients on the full-scale Ridler trophy, which is kept at GM Performance's Headquarters in Auburn Hills, Michigan.

The 60 recipients and/or builders of the Don Ridler Memorial Award are shown below:

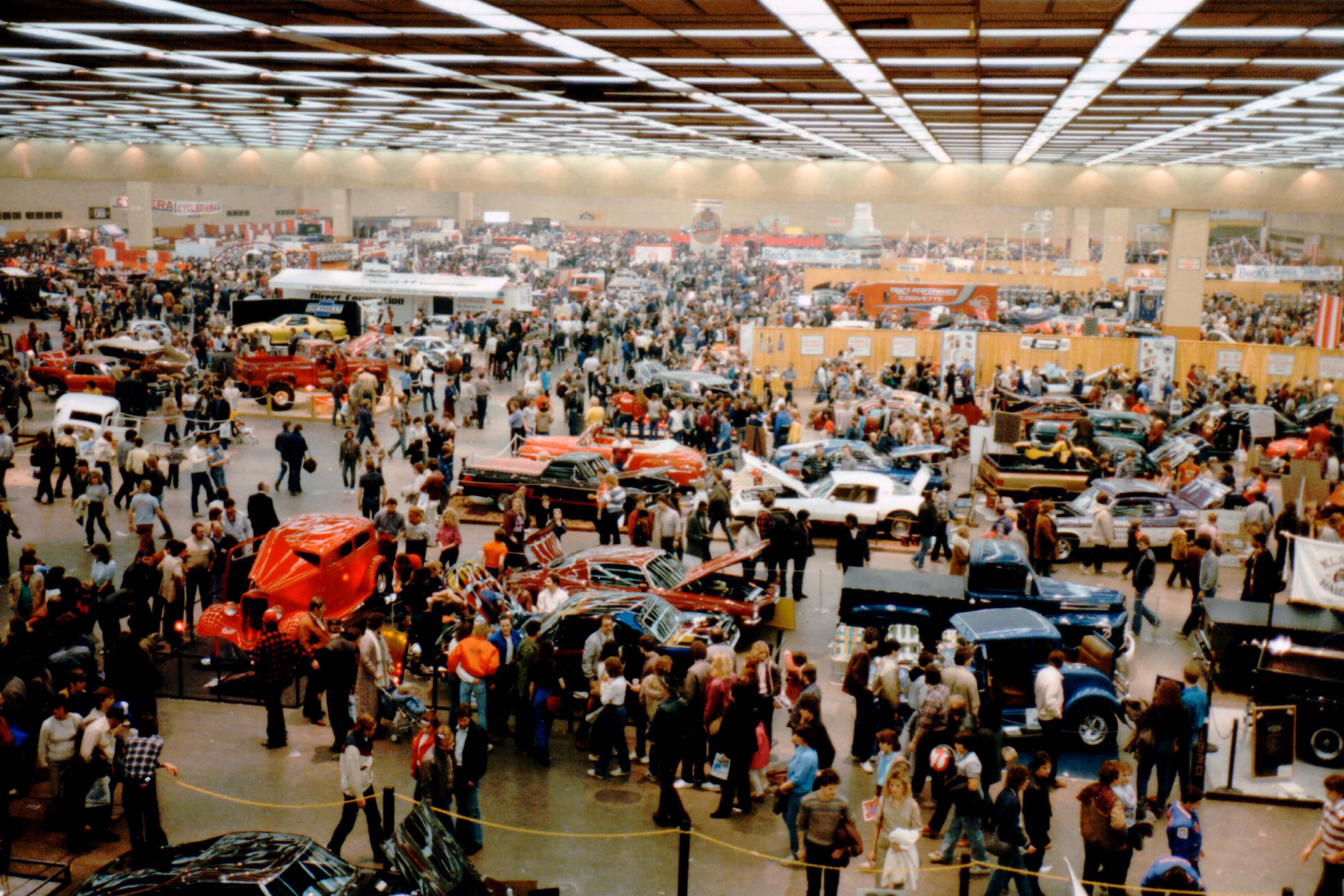
1985 Ridler Recipient, Bobby Alloway's 1934 Ford (bottom left corner), on display alongside over 300 other cars during the 33rd Annual Detroit Autorama.

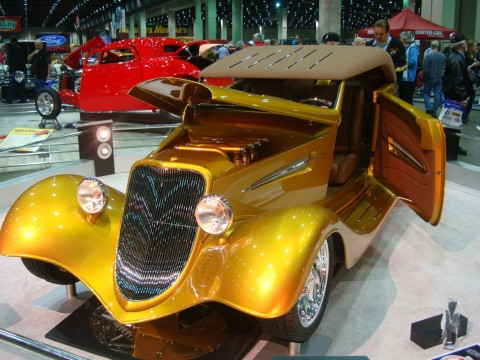
2010 Ridler Recipient: Tammy Ray's 1934 Ford Phaeton Gold Digger

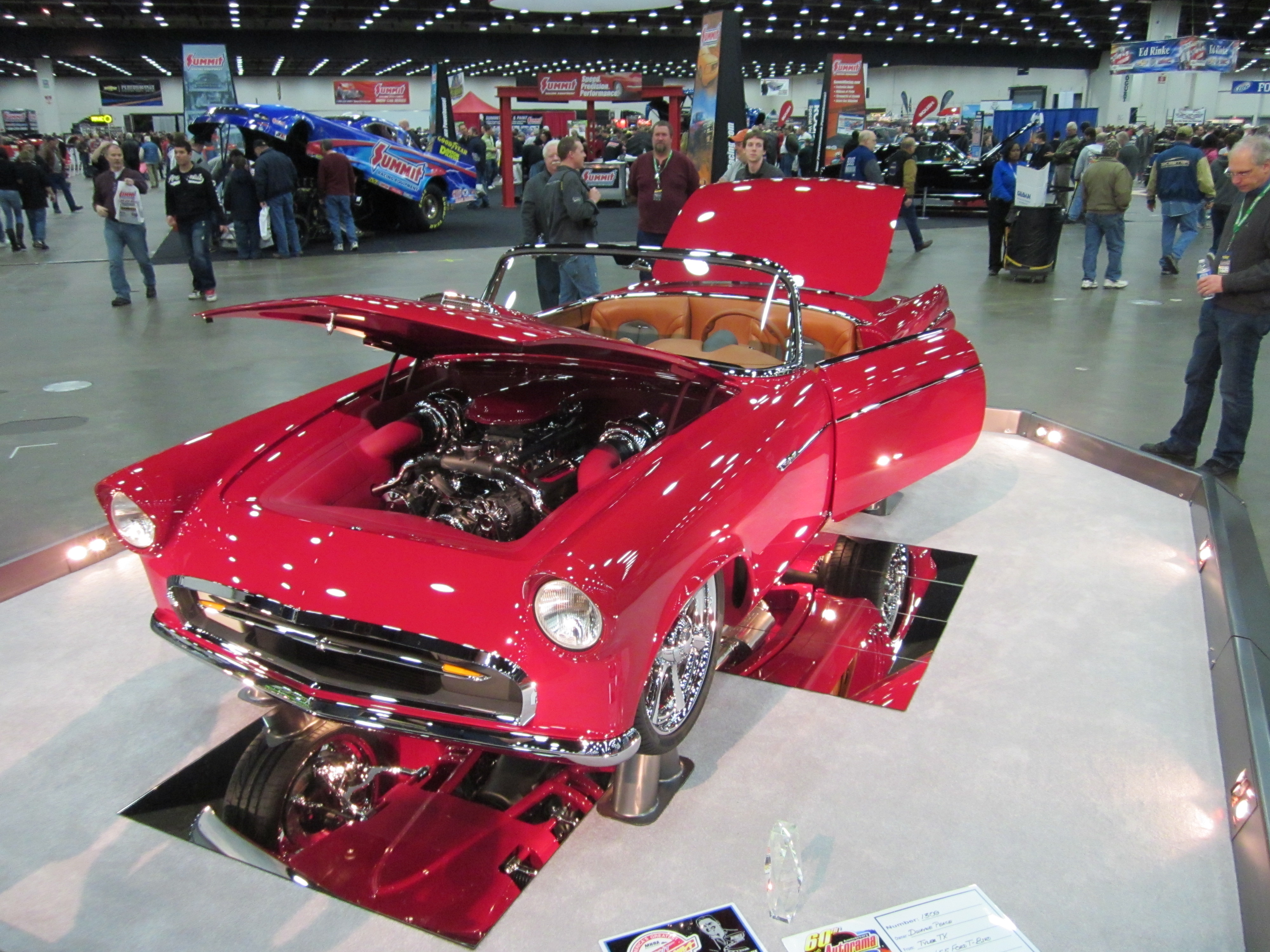
2012 Ridler Recipient: Dwayne Peace's 1955 Thunderbird

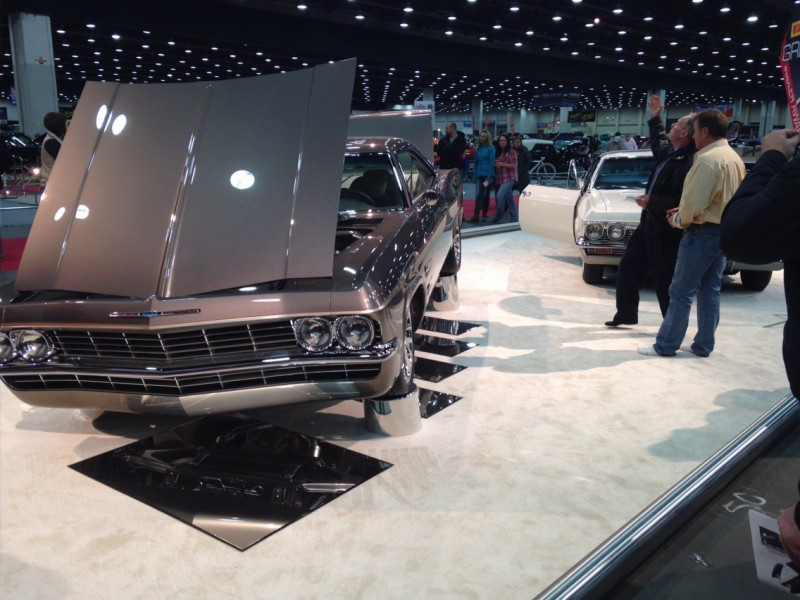
2015 Ridler Recipient: Don & Elma Voth's 1965 Impala Imposter

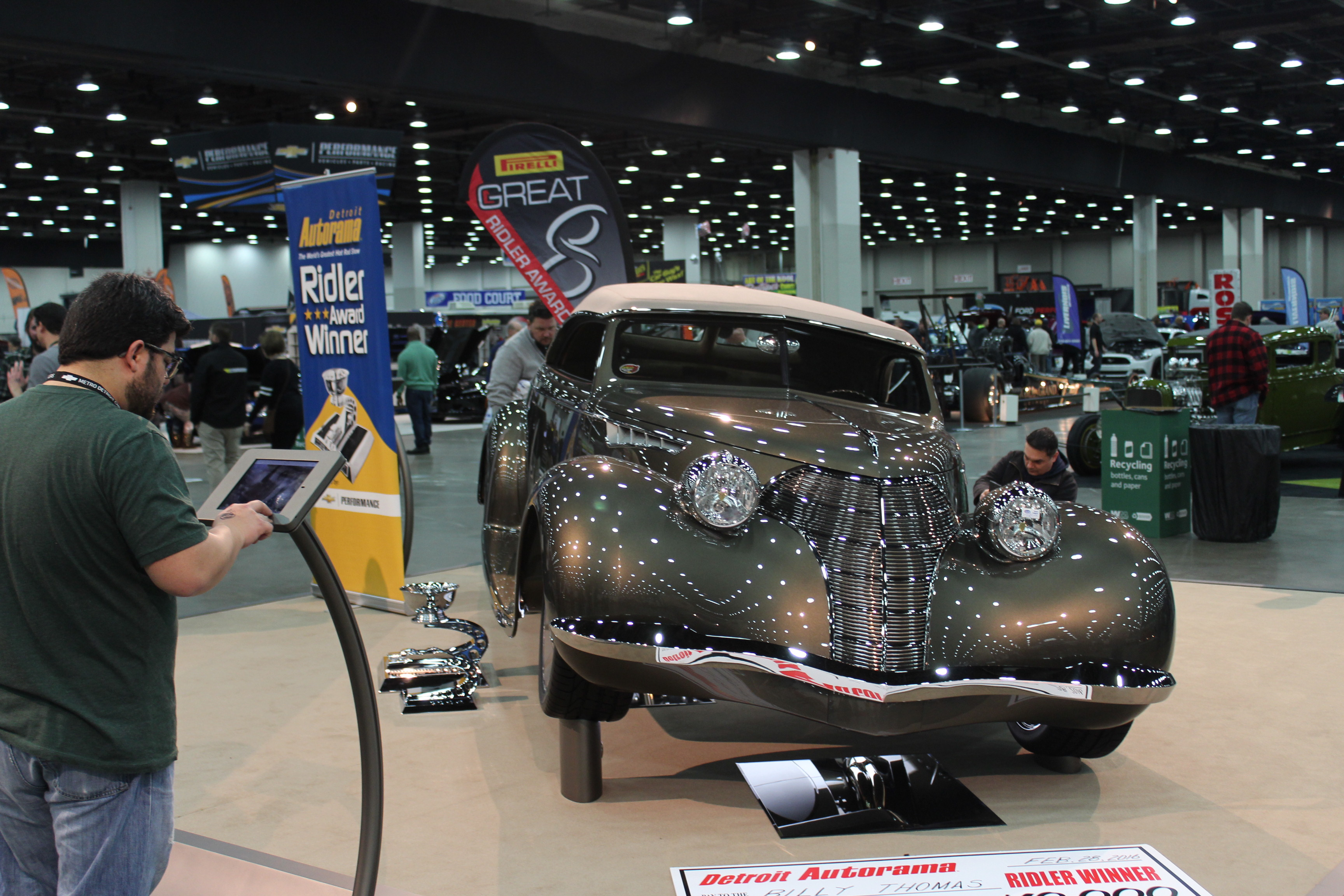
2016 Ridler Recipient: Billy & Debbie Thomas' 1939 Oldsmobile Convertible

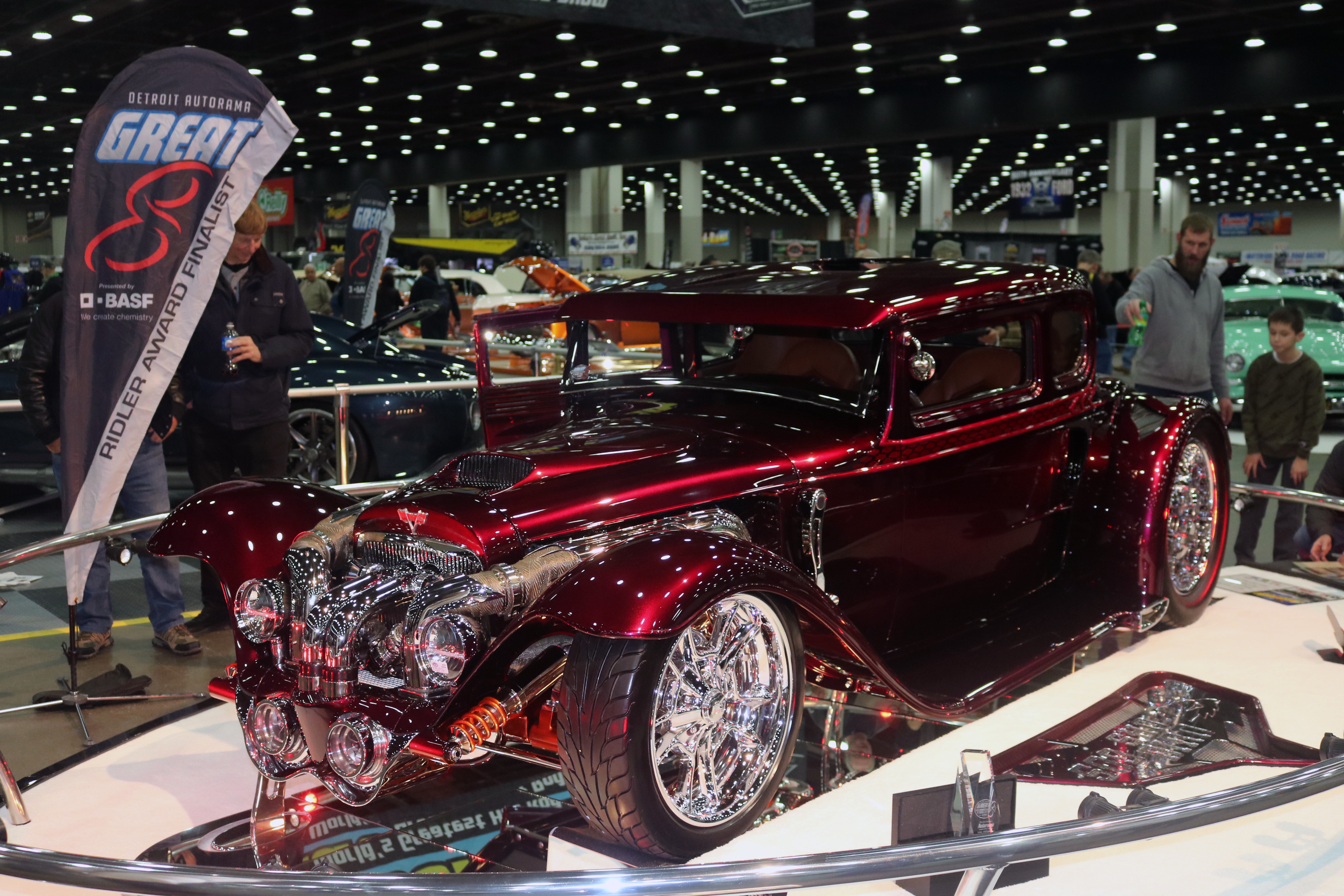
2022 Ridler Recipient: Rick and Paddy Bird's 1931 Chevy

== Past winners ==
Year	Owner/Funder	Vehicle	Name	Winner (Builder/Designer)
1964	Al Bergler	AA Comp Bantam coupe	Aggravation	
1965	Bob Massaron	1956 Chevrolet Custom	Venturian	Alexander Brothers
1966	Maynard Rupp	1966 Chevy Malibu SS 396 Funny Car	Chevoom	
1967	Mike Alexander	1966 Dodge Pickup	Deora	
1968	Chuck Miller	Hand-built fire truck	"Fire Truck"	
1969	Larry Alexander	Ford T roadster	Top Banana	
1970	Jan Bergel	1966 Dodge Hemi Charger	Electro Charger	George Busti
1971	John Greer	"C" Cab truck	Brinks Express	George Busti
1972	Jerry Pennington	Rear-engined Corvette	Scorpion	
1973	Jerry Pennington	Hand-built street rod	Devilfish	
1974	Don Campbell	1927 Ford T sedan	Tartan T	
1975	Bob Gutzke	1927 Model T Altered rod coupe		
1976	Robert Sweatt	1923 Ford AA/FA roadster	El Toro	
1977	Frank Camden	1926 Ford T sedan	Frigid T	
1978	Bob Anzalone	1923 Ford T roadster	Black Diamond	
1979	Frank Morabito	1923 Ford T touring	Garagefather	
1980	Everett Rezendes	1928 Ford sedan delivery	The Cranberry Delivery	
1981	Bob Tiano	1934 Ford 3-window coupe		Ron Morgan
1982	John Pappert	1934 Ford Model Y		
1983	Ron Barnum	1929 Ford 3-door sedan delivery	Renaissance Delivery	
1984	Bob Reed	1934 Ford Altered street coupe	The Khrome Shoppe Special	Greg Fleury/Cary Weisner
1985	Bobby Alloway	1933 Ford Victoria Altered street sedan		
1986	Dale Hunt	1986 Pontiac Grand Am Pro Stock	special thanks to Dewayne White for his hard work to complete this car	
1987	John Kolbusz	1934 Ford Altered street roadster		
1988	Mal Kieswetter	1932 Ford 3-window coupe	The Gambler	Boyd Coddington
1989	Mike Baliestiero	1934 Ford cabriolet Altered street roadster		
1990	Dan Webb	1932 Ford Altered street roadster		
1991	Tony Carlini	1933 Ford Altered street roadster		Gary Case
1992	Jimmy Stewart	1932 Ford sedan		
1993	Dave Stitzer	1940 Ford coupe		Don Pilkenton
1994	Fred Warren	1937 Ford coupe	Aero Coupe	Fred Warren/Tim Novick
1995	Bob Rizzoli	1992 Mercedes 560 SEC		
1996	George Poteet	1937 Ford roadster		Don Pilkenton
1997	Dave Emery	1932 Ford roadster		
1998	Eric Peratt & Ken Reister	1933 Ford roadster	21st Century Comet	Eric Peratt
1999	Bob Young	1932 Ford 3-window coupe		Don Pilkenton
2000	Paul Atkins	1933 Ford speedster coupe (phantom)		Greening Auto Company
2001	Chris Williams	1949 Chevy Coupe	M-80	Randy Clark
2002	Wesley & Bob Rydell	1935 Chevy	Grand Master	Chip Foose
2003	Ron Whiteside	1934 Ford	The Stallion	Chip Foose
2004	Al Brockly	1937 Willys coupe		Tim O'Donnell
2005	Ken Reister	1936 Ford hardtop convertible	Impression	Chip Foose
2006	Kevin & Karen Alstott	1935 Ford	Radster	Roger Burman @ Lakeside Rods & Rides
2007	Ross Myers	1936 Ford	First Love	Rad Rods By Troy
2008	Mike Warn	1960 Nash Rambler	Ferrambo	Divers Street Rods
2009	Doug Cooper	1932 Ford B400	Deucenberg	Alan Johnson @ Johnson's Hot Rod Shop
2010	Tammy Ray	1933 Ford Phaeton	Gold Digger	Ted Thomas @ T & T Customs
2011	Bruce Ricks	1956 Ford Sunliner convertible	Suncammer	Steve Cook
2012	Dwayne Peace, Tyler, Texas	1955 Ford Thunderbird		Torq'd Design Lab & Greening Auto
2013	Ron & Deb Cizek, Bennington, NE	1940 Ford Coupe	Checkered Past	Andy Leach @ Cal Automotive Creations
2014	J.F. Launier, Osoyoos, BC	1964 Buick Riviera	Rivision	J.F. Launier @ JF Kustoms
2015	Don & Elma Voth	1965 Chevrolet Impala	The Imposter	Chip Foose
2016	Billy & Debbie Thomas	1939 Oldsmobile convertible	Olds Cool	Harold Chapman @ Customs & Hot Rods of Andice
2017	Buddy Jordan	1933 Ford Roadster	Renaissance Roadster	Steve Fisbie @ Steve's Auto Restorations
2018	Greg & Judy Hrehovczik	1957 Chevy Impala	Imagine	Johnny Martin @ Johnny's Auto Trim & Rod Shop
2019	Steve Barton	1959 Cadillac Eldorado Brougham	Cadmad	Jordan Quintal Sr. @ Super Rides by Jordan
2020	Brad, Brady, and Cory Ranweiler	1963 Chevy 2-door station wagon	Impressive	Bradley, Brady, Cory Ranweiler @ Show Cars Automotive
2021*
2022	Rick and Paddy Bird	1931 Chevy Coupe	Sho Bird	Bruce Harvey @ Pro Comp Custom
2023	Luigi Deriggi	1950 Mercury Coupe	Maximus	Bruce Harvey @ Pro Comp Custom
2024	Davey and Tracey Maxwell	1953 Chevy Corvette	TwelveAir	Kindig-It Design

*The 2021 show was cancelled due to the COVID-19 pandemic.

== See also ==
- Grand National Roadster Show
- "America's Most Beautiful Roadster" (AMBR) Award
- General Motors Motorama
- Huntington Place (Formerly Cobo Center)
