= Michigan Hot Rod Association =

Automobile association

Michigan Hot Rod Association logo

The Michigan Hot Rod Association (MHRA) is an American association of 7 smaller automotive enthusiast clubs in Michigan: Shifters, Millwinders, Spark Plugs, Road Knights, Bearing Burners, Motor City Modified, and Competition Specialists.

The association puts on the Detroit Autorama car show held every year in March at TCF Center in Detroit, Michigan. The Association also hosts the Rod Repair Trailer which goes around to various NSRA and other events to help show participants in need of repair.
