= Grand National Roadster Show =

Car show held in California

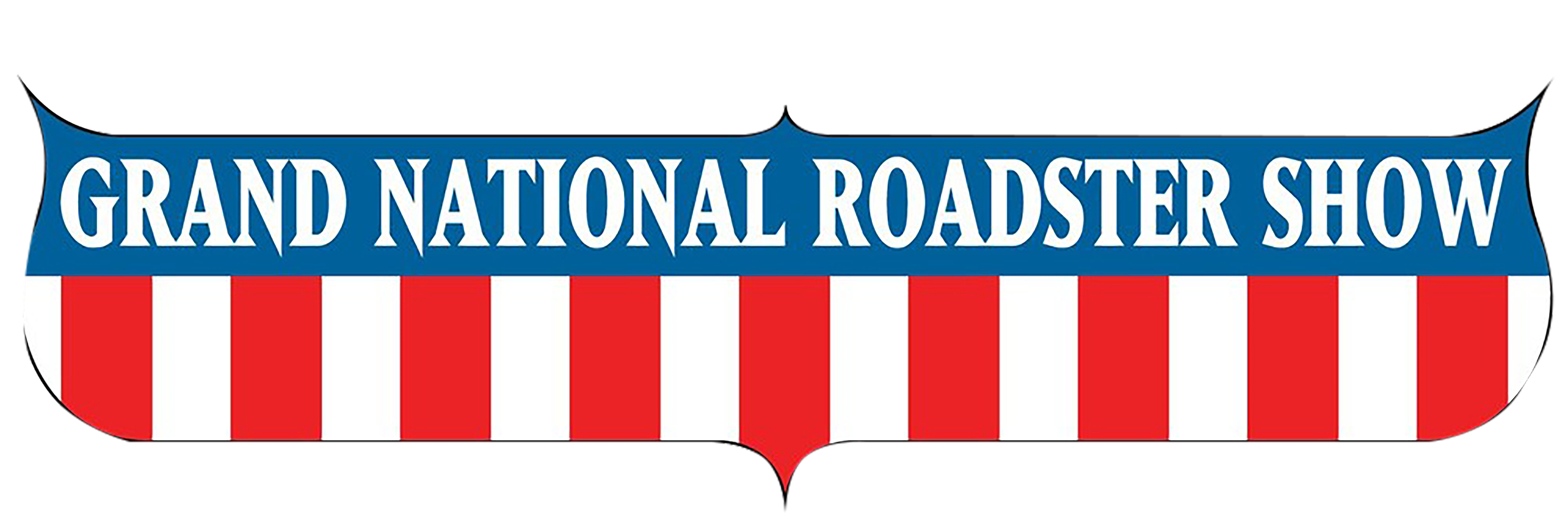

The Grand National Roadster Show (otherwise known as GNRS, or unofficially as the Oakland Roadster Show), is a showcase of custom cars and hot rods held each year at the Fairplex in Pomona, California, in either late January or early February.

Established in 1950 by Al Slonaker, the GNRS is one of the oldest and longest continuously operating exhibitions of custom vehicles in the United States, featuring an estimated 1,500 vehicles annually.

The GNRS is best known as home to the America's Most Beautiful Roadster (AMBR) Award. The AMBR is presented to the best pre-1937 vehicle in show, and has been won by many well-known car designers and builders, such as Blackie Gejeian, Carl Casper, Boyd Coddington, and Chip Foose.

Together, the Grand National Roadster Show and AMBR Award are considered among the two "Crown Jewel" competitions and awards for professional show car builders in North America, alongside the Detroit Autorama and its Don Ridler Memorial Award.

In addition to the AMBR, the GNRS created the Al Slonaker Memorial Award in 1974 to recognize the best "Non-Roadster" in show. The Slonaker Award has too been won by well-known car builders and owners, including rockers Eric Clapton and James Hetfield.

== History ==
In 1949, while Al Slonaker was preparing for his first automobile show at the Oakland Exposition, an Oakland area hot rod club convinced him to exhibit ten of their cars . The Inaugural show was a massive success, attracting over 100 cars and 27,674 attendees. The next year, Slonaker decided to focus solely on hot rods, but concerned for potential bad press, he promoted it as the "National Roadster Show." In 1962, "Grand" was added to the title, contributing to the show's long-time moniker as "The Grand-Daddy of them All".

In 1967, the show moved to the Oakland Coliseum Between 1998 and 2003, the show was held at a variety of other San Francisco-Bay Area venues before relocating to Southern California's Fairplex in 2004.

According to the show promoter, Rod Shows Inc., the GNRS features more than 600 vehicles over seven indoor pavilions, with somewhere between 800 and 1,200 additional vehicles filling the remaining 487-acre Fairplex property.

Over seven decades, the GNRS has been covered extensively in national automotive publications, including Hot Rod, Street Rodder, and Rod & Custom, with several AMBR Award winners gracing their covers.

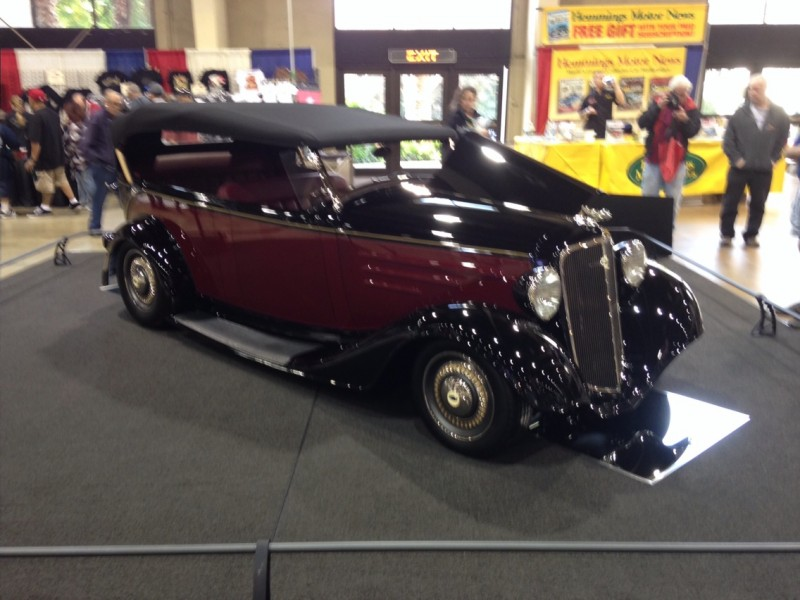
The 2014 AMBR Award Winner: Wes Rydell's 1935 Chevy Phaeton.

== Awards ==
Since the show's inception in 1950, the grand prize has been the "America's Most Beautiful Roadster" or AMBR award. It is a 9-foot "megatrophy" with the names of past winners engraved on its base.

From 1957 until 1971, there was also a separate "America's Best Competition Car Award" presented at the show.

In 1974, the GNRS created an additional award to recognize the best non-roadster entry: the Al Slonaker Memorial Award. The award is open to all types of vehicles, Rods, Customs, Street Machines, Lowriders, VW's, and Trucks.

In addition to the AMBR and Slonaker Award finalist, the show gives out place awards for more than 100 classes, plus 50 "Special" awards for clubs and outstanding displays.

== List of AMBR Award Winners ==
See "America's Most Beautiful Roadster" (AMBR) Award

== List of Al Slonaker Memorial Award Winners ==
Year	Vehicle	Owner	Builder
1974	1909 Ford C-Cab (Country Butcher)	Bob Reed	
1975	1926 Ford T Sedan	John Buttera	
1976	1963 Corvette (The Condor)	Jack Walker	
1977	1956 Harley Davidson	Syd DeSota	
1978	1977 Jeep	Dusty Santos	
1979	1926 Ford	Ken Nannenhorn	
1980	1964 VW Bug (Spellbound)	Ed Papac	
1981	1933 Ford Roadster	Vern Luce	
1982	1932 Ford Roadster (Pinocchio)	Jay Ohrberg	
1983	1957 Chevy (Gold Nugget)	Bob Checchini	
1984	1971 Corvette	Ed Gonsalves	
1985	1932 Ford Sedan Delivery	Steve Lykens	
1986	1966 Corvette (High Plains Drifter)	James Winfrey	
1987	1951 Mercury	Frank DeRosa	
1988	1969 VW Karman Ghia (Rod Buster)	Chris Addington	
1989	1988 Ford Thunderbird (Pegasus)	Jim Thayer	
1990	1955 VW Bug (Pink Lady)	Bernt Karlsson	
1991	1956 Lincoln (Royal Empress)	Bill Abate	
1992	1992 Harley Davidson	Bob Dron	
1993	1984 Jeep CJ-7	David Sellers	
1994	1932 Ford Woody (Speed Wagon)	Dan Fink	
1995	1940 Ford Sedan Delivery	Richard Mattioli	
1996	1940 Ford Coupe (Dominator)	Leonard Lopez	
1997	1937 Ford Coupe (Aero Coupe)	Fred Warren	
1998	1954 Corvette Nomad	Tom Armstrong	
1999	1947 Ford Convertible (Job-One)	Dave Crook	
2000	1932 Ford	Larry Anderson	
2001	1933 Ford	Bud Meyer	
2002	1949 Chevy Coupe (M-80)	Chris Williams	
2003	1961 Corvette	Rich Stadelhofer	
2004	1936 Chrysler	Jack White	Extreme Customs and Tim's Hot Rods.
2005	1936 Ford Coupe	Jorge Zaragoza	
2006	1932 Ford Track Roadster	Zane Cullen	
2007	1935 Ford Woody Wagon	Jim Noteboom	
2008	2006 Caresto V8 Roadster	Leif Tufvesson	
2009	1939 Ford Woody Wagon	Brian Hill	
2010	2009 VSR Concept Sports Rod	Wayne Cherry	
2011	1936 Ford Tudor Sedan	Andy Barcheck	KR Customs
2012	1932 Ford 4 Door Vicky	Eric Clapton	Roy Brizio Street Rods
2013	1939 Ford 2 Door Hard Top	Jerry Kjensrud	A&M Deluxe Customs
2014	1948 Jaguar Coachbuilt	James Hetfield	Rick Dore Kustoms
2015	1950 Chevy Fleetside PU	Craig Moyes	Kindig-It Designs
2016	1933 Ford Coupe	Wayne Halabura	Creative Concepts and Restorations
2017	1957 Chevy Nomad (ShoMad)	Ron Maier	A&M Deluxe Customs
2018	1929 Ford Tudoor Sedan	Mark Marianin	Rad Rides By Troy
2019	1957 Chevy (Imagine)	Johnny Martin	
2020	1936 Willys Pick Up	Ron Ernsberger	The Tin Man's Garage
2021*
2022	1932 Ford Coupe	Pat Gauntt	Devlin Rod and Custom
2023	1960 Buick Invicta	George Eliacostas	CAL Auto Creations
2024	1959 Chevy Impala (Bespoke)	David and Robin Rush	Steve Cook Creations

== See also ==
- Detroit Autorama
- America's Most Beautiful Roadster (AMBR) Award
- Pomona Fairplex
