= Caresto =

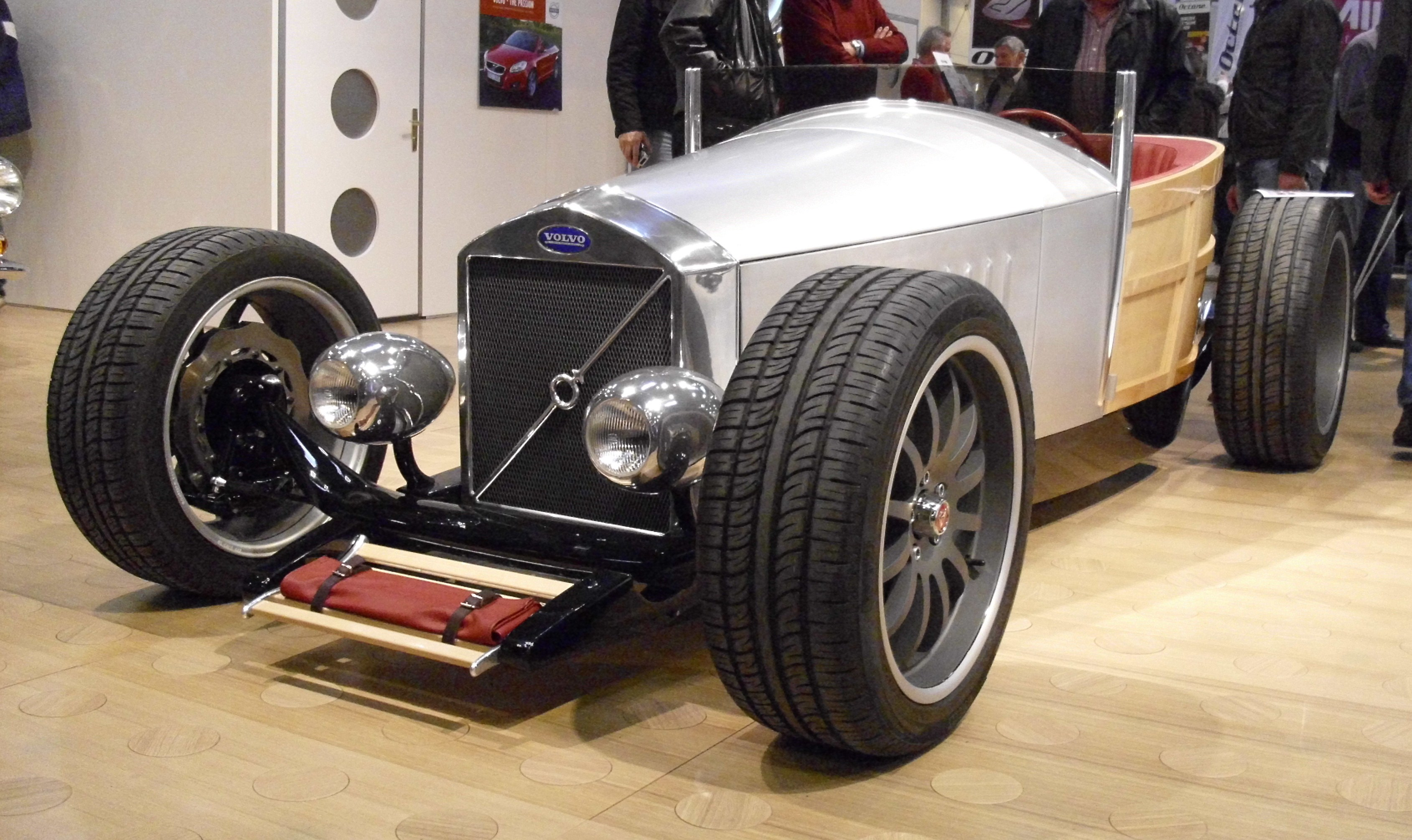
- Industry: Automotive
- Founded: 1996
- Founder: Leif Tufvesson
- Headquarters: Angelholm, Sweden
- Products: Hot Rods sports cars
- Website: www.caresto.se

Caresto is a Swedish car company which was started in 1996 by Leif Tufvesson.

Caresto is registered in Ängelholm in southern Sweden (Vegeå Tegelbruk, Rodervägen, SE 262 94, Ängelholm). Leif Tufvesson is the founder and creator of 4 (2 different, and 2 of a kind) of its Hot Rod sports car, used by Volvo in different car shows, such as SEMA, as well as a limited edition of an individualized Volvo C70 hardtop convertible.

Leif Tufvesson previously worked for the Volvo Concept Center and for six years he was responsible for the development department of Koenigsegg, a Swedish sports car manufacturer. In 2004 he won the prestigious "Hot Rod of the Year" award from Hot Rod Magazine and "Most Innovative Car" in the USA.

== History ==
Leif Tufvesson began by fitting car audio equipment and went on to build a reputation in Sweden as a restorer of older cars. He established Caresto in 1996, the company name being a contraction of "car restoration". The Swedish classic-car magazine Klassiker instead dates his running of the firm to 1997.

Tufvesson spent about a year at Volvo Cars, where he built concept cars and components for them, a role described in later accounts as a position at the Volvo Concept Center. In 1998 Christian von Koenigsegg recruited him to help set up Koenigsegg, where he worked on the marque's first car, introduced in 2001, and then on the CCR. He headed the Koenigsegg development department for six years. After winning the Hot Rod of the Year award he left to devote himself to Caresto, saying that at Koenigsegg he had been realising von Koenigsegg's ambitions rather than his own. The Swedish motoring press has also credited him with a Most Innovative Car award in the United States.

Caresto works from premises in a former brickworks outside Ängelholm in southern Sweden. Its vehicles are built largely by hand by Tufvesson together with a small group of specialist suppliers, and he has said that he has considered growing the firm but prefers to keep it small. Hand-beaten aluminium is his preferred material, and the bodies of his hot rods are shaped from it.

== Volvo-based cars ==
=== Volvo T6 Roadster ===
Tufvesson's first hot rod built around Volvo mechanicals, the T6 Roadster, brought him the Hot Rod of the Year award from the American magazine Hot Rod in 2004. Accounts of its public debut differ: Car Body Design dates the presentation of the car to 2005, while Top Gear places its appearance at the SEMA show in Las Vegas in 2004.

=== V8 Speedster and Volvo C70 Caresto Edition ===
The Caresto V8 Speedster, a mid-engined two-seater developed with support from Volvo and sold under the Caresto name, had its public premiere at the 2006 SEMA show. Tufvesson described it as a sports car extending the design language of the classic hot rod, arguing that handling had never been a strength of the type, and the car gave rise to the term "Sportrod".

According to Caresto and Volvo, the car combines a tubular steel frame with front and rear subframes, double A-arms in polished stainless steel and Öhlins coil-over dampers, with the front units mounted inboard; the body is hand-formed aluminium with carbon composite panels and a removable hard top. Power comes from a 4.4-litre Volvo B8444S V8 converted to run on ethanol by the Swedish tuning firm BSR, rated at 315 hp on petrol and 340 hp on ethanol, driving through a six-speed automatic transaxle with sequential manual shifting. Braking is by Brembo four-piston calipers on 355 mm discs, kerb weight is given as 1,200 kg and weight distribution as 60/40 in favour of the rear axle. Features highlighted at the time included three integrated rear-view cameras, CAD-milled aluminium components extending to the housings for the Hella xenon headlamps, and a temperature-controlled bonnet that opens automatically for additional cooling. The exterior and interior were developed jointly with the car designer Per Gyllenspetz.

Two examples were completed in under two years, identical apart from their colours, one for the SEMA display and one retained in Sweden; the estimated price was around 2.5 million Swedish kronor, roughly US$338,000, and Tufvesson hoped to build at least six.

The V8 Speedster returned to SEMA in 2007 alongside a Volvo C70 reworked by Caresto and shown as the C70 Caresto Edition, which received a new front and rear treatment, a revised interior and a two-tone blue finish echoing the Speedster.

=== Six-wheeled Volvo XC60 ===
In 2013 Caresto completed a six-wheeled Volvo XC60 commissioned by Volvo Cars as a camera platform for filming other cars, the additional axle and carefully matched suspension and tyre pressures serving to suppress vibration and movement. Function took precedence over appearance: cameras, booms and mounts can be combined in several configurations, lashing points are distributed around the body, and the matt black finish was chosen so that the vehicle would not be reflected in the paintwork of the car being filmed.

== Caresto K2 ==
The Caresto K2 is a supersports car commissioned by a client who had originally wanted a replica of a Formula One car but changed his mind after acquiring a genuine example, at which point Tufvesson proposed building a car of his own design instead. It has a carbon fibre chassis and bodywork and a supercharged V8 developing 550 bhp; the finished car was not registered for road use and is kept by its owner as a track car.

== Commissions for Jon Olsson ==
It was the K2 that brought Caresto to the attention of the Swedish freeskier Jon Olsson, who approached Tufvesson about an Audi R8 project that had stalled; the collaboration led instead to the Rebellion R2K. The car mated the chassis and running gear of an Ultima GTR to a Lamborghini drivetrain beneath an entirely new body, and Olsson drove it on the 2013 Gumball 3000 from Copenhagen to Monaco without mechanical trouble.

Caresto also built Olsson's DTM-inspired Audi RS6 estate, which was among the most widely publicised cars of the 2015 Gumball 3000; Tufvesson characterised the work as principally body moulding together with some engine tuning.

== Arkham Car ==
In 2016, Caresto built a drivable Batmobile, known as the Arkham Car, for Team Galag of Saudi Arabia, which had previously entered a replica of the Tumbler in the rally. The design follows the Batmobile of the 2015 video game Batman: Arkham Knight, reworked for drivability, and the car was described as the first road-going vehicle based on that version. According to Top Gear, Tufvesson and his suppliers designed and built it in under a year, working from a toy model and footage from the game and carrying over assemblies from the donor Gallardo such as the engine bay and fuel tank. Jalopnik suggested that it might be the first Batmobile produced by a company in the motor industry rather than by a film studio since the original, which was based on the Lincoln Futura concept car.

The mid-engined car uses a 5.2-litre Lamborghini V10 rated at 560 hp driving through a paddle-shift gearbox, and measures 3.40 m between the axles and 2.5 m across, running on 26-inch wheels. Caresto gives the structure as a rigid tubular frame carrying a carbon fibre body produced from full-size moulds milled from CAD data, with fully independent double-wishbone suspension, coil-over dampers, an aluminium pushrod arrangement at the front, and ABS-assisted Brembo brakes using eight-piston calipers at the front and six-piston at the rear. The cockpit canopy opens electrically, the interior is trimmed in black leather with gold stitching and lighting in the seats, floor and pedals, and the car is equipped with air conditioning, power steering and an audio system.

The Arkham Car ran on the 2016 Gumball 3000 from Dublin to Bucharest, a route of some 3,000 miles.

== Sportsrod ==
The Caresto Sportsrod is a collaboration between Tufvesson and a local coachbuilder: a very light tubular-chassis car styled after a 1932 Ford and offered with a choice of automotive, motorcycle or electric power. Tufvesson has described it as a hot rod suitable for track use, pairing period appearance with modern road behaviour; the demonstrator is powered by a Honda Gold Wing flat-six.

== Restoration work ==
Alongside its show and concept cars, Caresto restores older vehicles. By 2013, the firm had taken on Elisabeth II, a coupé bodied by the Italian carrozzeria Vignale in 1953 on a Volvo PV444 base for the businessman Gösta Wennerberg, who had envisaged a small production run that never materialised. The car served as everyday transport until the late 1970s, and a restoration begun in the 1980s left the aluminium body stripped of paint before it stood outdoors for many years. Tufvesson described the condition as poor, with the floor missing and the roof pillars cracked, attributing the damage to the combination of the PV's unitary construction with an unreinforced aluminium body, and set no timescale for the work.
