= Chip Foose =

American designer, artist, and TV personality

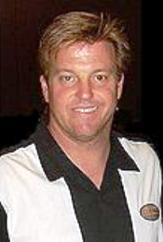
- Foose at a SEMA show
- Born: Douglas Sam Foose; October 13, 1963 (age 63); Santa Barbara, California, U.S.
- Occupations: Automobile designer, television presenter
- Children: 2
- Website: www.chipfoose.com

Douglas Sam "Chip" Foose (born October 13, 1963) is an American automobile designer, artist, and star designer of the car-customization reality television series Overhaulin'.

== Life and career ==
Foose Design's logo

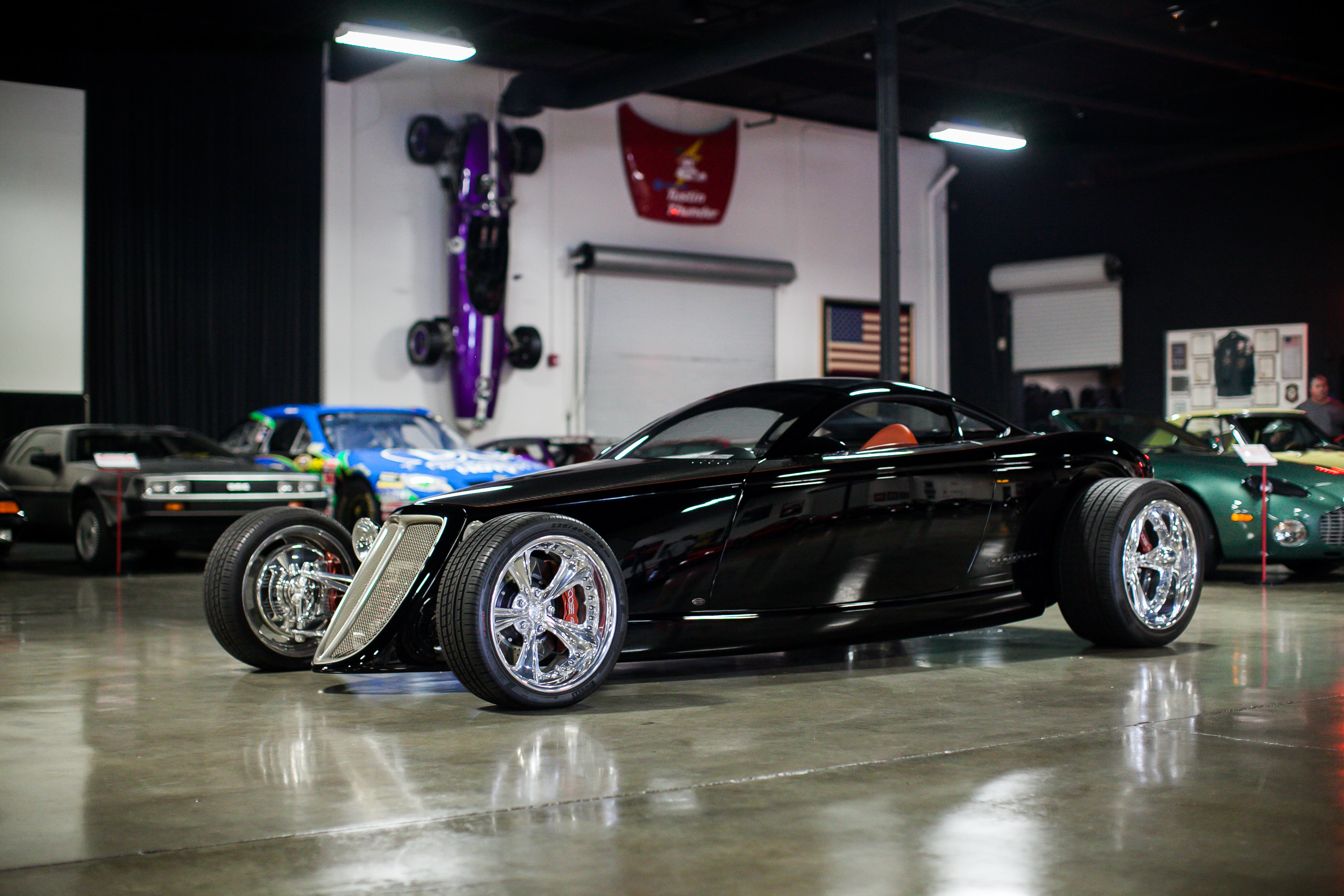
The 2006 Hemi(s)fear at the Marconi Automotive Museum

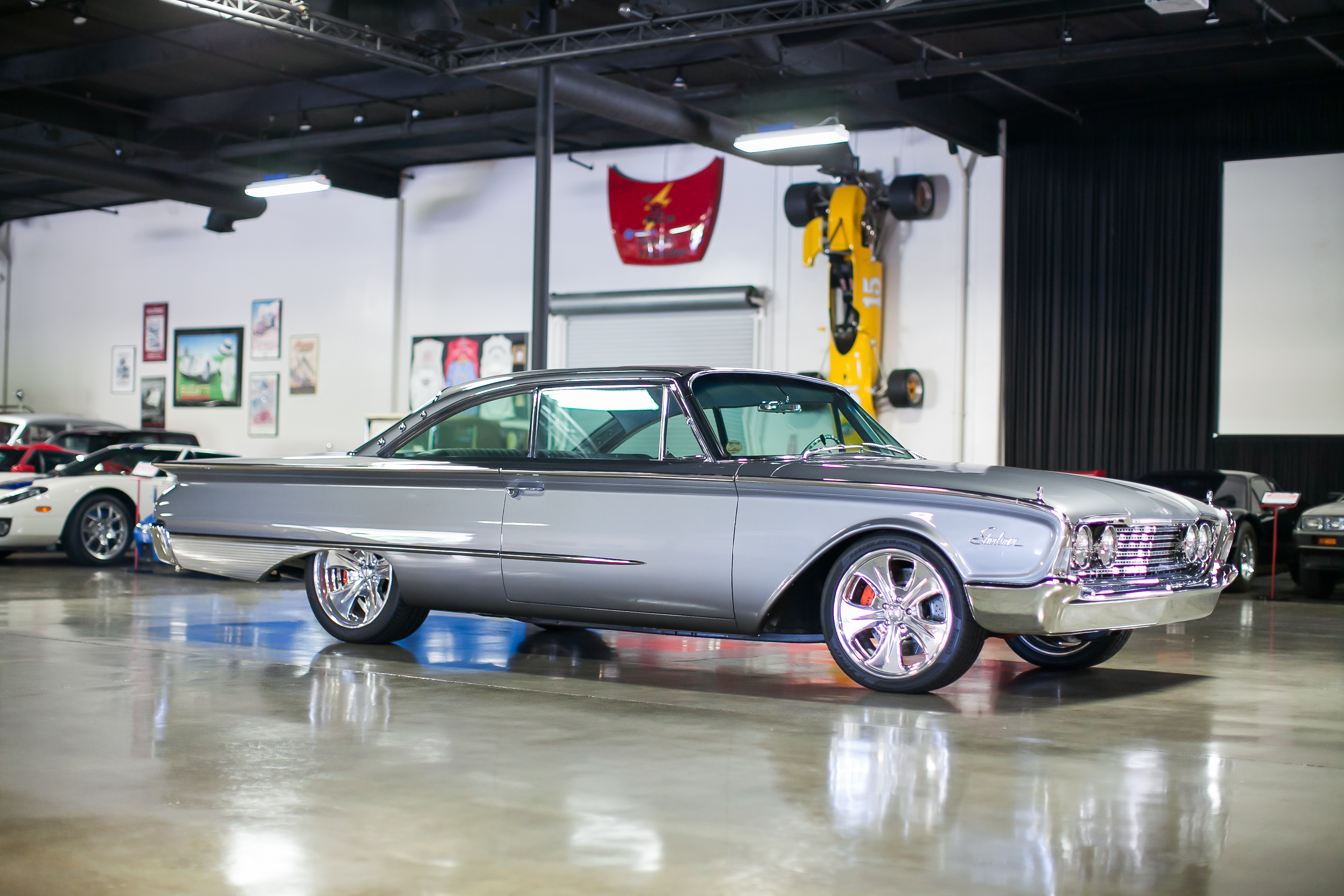
The custom 1960 Ford Starliner at the Marconi Automotive Museum, customized by Chip Foose

Foose began working on automobiles at age seven for his father's company, Project Design, in Santa Barbara, California. Encouraged by Ford and Tucker Car Corporation designer Alex Tremulis, Foose started to attend the Art Center College of Design in 1982; however, he dropped out after two years due to financial difficulties. After working for four years at Clenet Coachworks, Foose returned to the Art Center to complete his education.

After graduating in 1990, Foose worked full-time for Sterenberger Design and part-time for Boyd Coddington. In 1993, Foose resigned from Sterenberger to work for J Mays at Ford; however, Coddington was able to convince Foose to work for him, instead. Working for Coddington full-time, Foose eventually became the president of Coddington's company, Hot Rods by Boyd. While working for Coddington, Foose designed many of Coddington's well known creations such as Boydster and Boydster II.

In 1998, with Hot Rods by Boyd facing bankruptcy (due to the failure of Boyds Wheels), Foose left his position and with his wife Lynne started his own automotive and product design company. He first set up in Orange, California, where, as his first project car, he rebuilt Boydster II for Chuck Svatos as the 0032 roadster, which went on to win the America's Most Beautiful Roadster (AMBR) trophy. By 2000, he had established Foose Design in Huntington Beach, California. Foose's departure from Boyd's was not amicable; in a 2006 interview, Foose stated, "Boyd has chosen to not have any relations with me, since I stopped working at his shop." One of the main reasons for the bitter relationship is claimed to be Foose retained many of the talented builders formerly employed by Coddington; Mike and Charley left Coddington's business shortly after Foose had established his shop.

Foose gained more exposure in 2003 as a result of a TLC documentary on his design and creation of a modified 2002 Ford Thunderbird called Speedbird, and due to his work building Ron Whiteside's 2003 Ridler-winning '34 3-window. In 2004, the TLC program Overhaulin' debuted, with Foose as the star. At the 2005 Specialty Equipment Market Association (SEMA) show, a unique 1969 Foose-designed Camaro convertible was displayed, to be produced in a 300 car run by Unique Performance of Dallas Texas. Press releases announced UP would also be handling the marketing of Foose's other custom car lines, including Hemisfear, along with Foose's 2006 Mustang Stallion. Foose also designed a paint scheme for 4-time NASCAR Sprint Cup Champion Jeff Gordon to promote DuPont's Hot Hues paint line. Foose has since severed ties with DuPont and now promotes the BASF Glasurit paint line exclusively.

In November 2007, Foose officially severed ties to Unique Performance following police action against UP for alleged illegal activities. In 2006, Foose launched a line of die cast replicas of many of his famous designs partnering with the makers of Johnny Lightning in the creation of JL Full Throttle. This company produced copies of many of Foose's famous, award-winning designs, including Grand Master and Impression. In 2002, Foose won the coveted Ridler Award at the 50th Anniversary Show of the Detroit Autorama with Bob and Wes Rydell's '35 Chevy Master, Grandmaster. Impression subsequently won the prestigious Ridler prize. Also replicated were a number of cars from "Overhaulin'". Announced at the SEMA show in 2006 was a pact between Foose and Ford to produce Foose-designed Ford vehicles, the first of which was shown at the 2007 New York Auto Show.

In 2007, Foose began limited production (50 vehicles in total) of Hemisfear. Also known as the Foose Coupe, Hemisfear was designed by Foose in 1990, during his time at the Art Center, and publicly unveiled at the SEMA trade show in November 2006. An earlier design drawing of Hemisfear inspired the Plymouth Prowler. The 2007 Hemisfear was commissioned by a new die cast model car company JL Full Throttle which had partnered with Foose to build both the scale and 1:1 Hemisfear. A Foose coupe was sold along with a design consultation with Foose at the Barrett-Jackson car auction in Palm Beach, Florida at the end of March 2007. The first Foose Coupe Supercar was auctioned for $340,000; it was sold to Atlanta vintage car dealer and avid car collector Roger Burgess.

Foose was retained as design consultant to provide architects with unique styling elements for the exterior and interior of the $275 million expansion of Detroit's MotorCity Casino, anticipated to be complete by the end of 2007.

Foose helped to start the Ridemakerz customizable toy cars business in 2007.

As of 2010, Foose continues to operate Foose Design and provide design consultations to the Big Three automakers. He has also built the '32 Ford roadster coupe Magnatude. Overhaulin' was canceled at the end of 2009, though reruns still air on Discovery Turbo. Shortly following the launch of the channel Velocity, it was announced that the show would return in the fourth quarter of 2012.

== Charity work ==
Foose serves as the vice chairman of the Progeria Research Foundation's California Chapter. His youngest sister died of Hutchinson–Gilford progeria syndrome. He has also taken part in numerous children's charities such as Childhelp and Victory Junction Gang Camp. He was named grand marshal of SEMA's Show N' Shine public car show for children's charities.

== Awards and honors ==
In November 1997, Foose became the youngest person to be inducted into the Hot Rod Hall of Fame. Additionally, Foose was inducted into the Darryl Starbird Rod & Custom Car Museum Hall of Fame in 2002, the Grand National Roadster Show Hall of Fame in 2003, the Detroit Autorama "Circle of Champions" Hall of Fame in 2012, and the San Francisco Rod and Custom Motorcycle Hall of Fame in 2005. In January 2019, Foose was recognized as the Builder of the Decade by the Grand National Roadster Show. Foose has also won the following awards for his work:

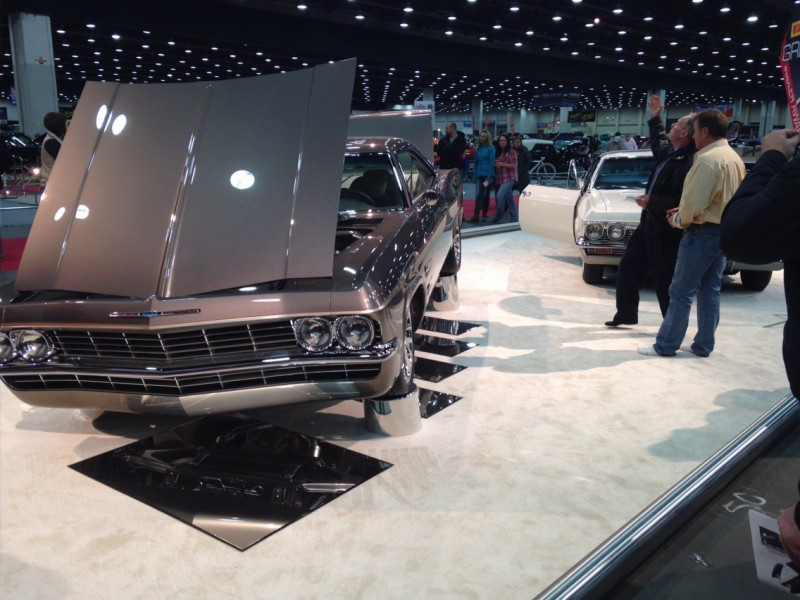
Foose, next to his 2015 Ridler-winning '65 Impala Imposter for Bob and Elma Voth

- Ridler Award in 2002, 2003, 2005 and 2015.
- Most Beautiful Roadster Award in 1995, 1996, 1999, 2000, 2001, 2003, 2006, and 2014. Some of these cars were designed by Foose and completed by other builders such as Troy Trepanier, Barry White, and Bobby Alloway.
- The Goodguys Street Rod of the Year Award in the years 1990, 1991, 1995, 1997, 1999, 2001 and 2010.
- Diecast Hall of Fame Inductee 2009.
- Best Hot Rod at Bilsport Performance Show 2011.
- Best Custom Car - 1954 Chevrolet "Cool Air" NACE Expo 2014
