= Volvo T6 =

Concept Car

Volvo T6

The Volvo T6 was a concept car from Volvo presented in 2005 at SEMA. There was just one hand built copy, although there was some discussion about a limited production run. It is powered by a twin turbocharged 2.9 litre inline six cylinder engine from Volvo S80 giving a reported 300 bhp (224 kW) but with no official reported top speed. The engine is located behind the driver.

Its design is inspired by hot rod cars. It was named the 2004 Hot Rod of the Year by Hot Rod Magazine. It was designed by Per Gyllenspetz from Labyrint Studio, and built by Leif Tufvesson. Many believe the shape and body to take inspiration from the Plymouth Prowler, because, much like the Prowler, the T6 was designed to be a modern take on the classic hot rod.
