= Troy Trepanier =

American automobile designer and builder

Troy Trepanier is an American automobile designer and builder. He is the owner of Rad Rides by Troy in Manteno, Illinois. Trepanier built the 2007 Ridler Award-winning 1936 Ford three-window coupe, First Love, for Ross Myers.
