= Boyd Coddington =

American hot rod automobile designer

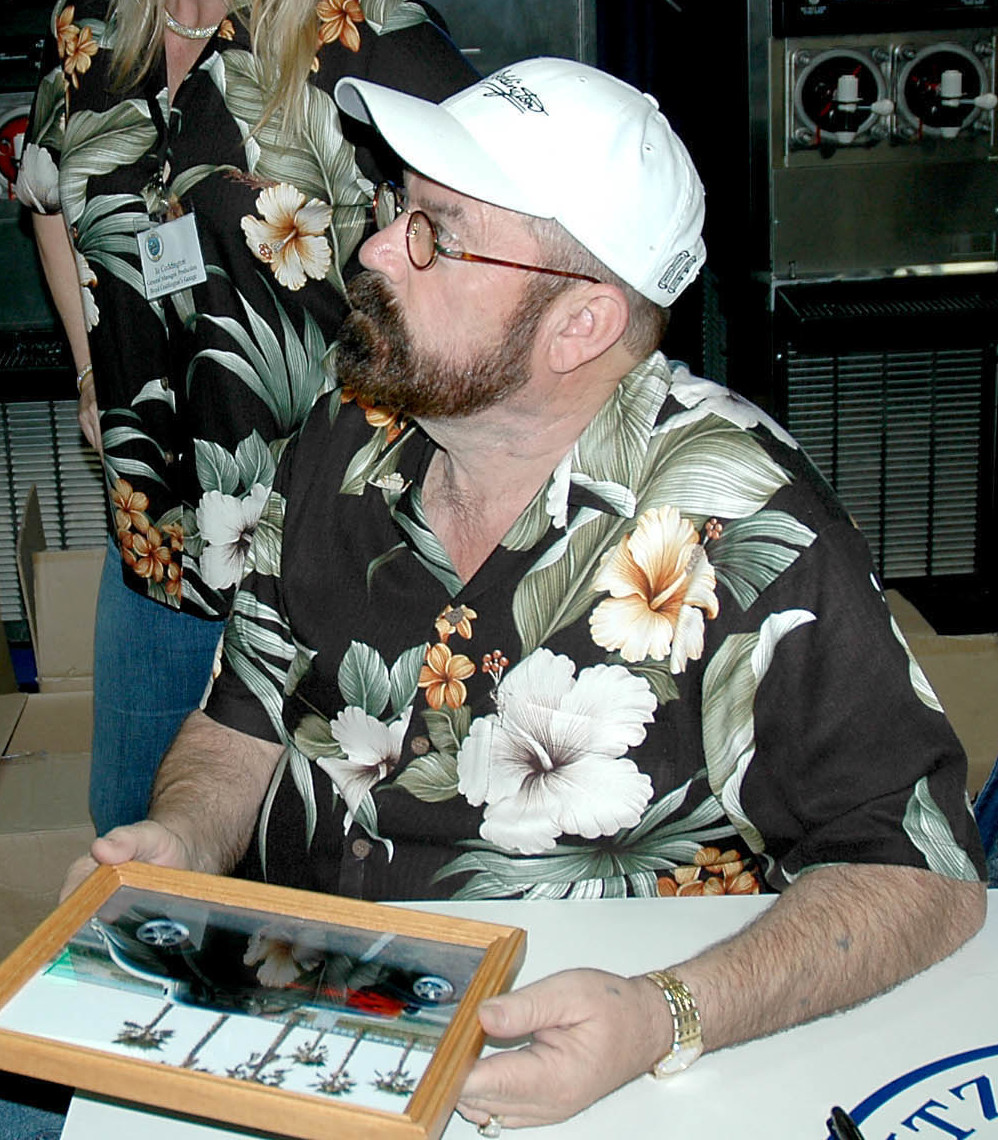
- Coddington from American Hot Rod signs autographs aboard the nuclear-powered aircraft carrier Nimitz in 2005
- Born: August 28, 1944; Rupert, Idaho, U.S.
- Died: February 27, 2008 (aged 63); Whittier, California, U.S.
- Occupations: Hot rod designer TV show host
- Spouse(s): Jo Andenise Clausen McGee (m. 2002); Diane Marie Ragone Elkins (m.1971–1996); Peggy Jeanne King (m.1965–?)
- Children: With Jo: none With Diane: 3 With Peggy: 1

Boyd Coddington (August 28, 1944 – February 27, 2008) was an American hot rod designer, the owner of the Boyd Coddington Hot Rod Shop, and star of American Hot Rod on TLC.

== Early life, education, and early career ==
Coddington grew up in Rupert, Idaho, reading all the car and hot rod magazines he could, and got his first car (a 1931 Chevrolet truck) at age 13. He attended machinist trade school and completed a three-year apprenticeship in machining. In 1968, he moved to California, building hot rods by day and working as a machinist at Disneyland at night. He soon became known for building unique hot rods, and in 1977, he opened his own shop, Hot Rods by Boyd, in Stanton, California. His first major customer was Vern Luce, whose car, a 1933 coupe, won the Al Slonaker Award at the 1981 Oakland Roadster show.

== Design innovations ==
Coddington was known for clean, elegant designs combining old school with what would come to be known as the "Boyd Look".

Some of Coddington's signature innovations were his custom-fabricated alloy wheels, typically machined from a solid aluminium billet, an industry first. Together with John Buttera, Boyd pioneered "billet" machining broadly throughout a car.

In 1988, Coddington founded Boyd's Wheels, Inc. to manufacture and market his custom billet wheels.

== CadZZilla ==
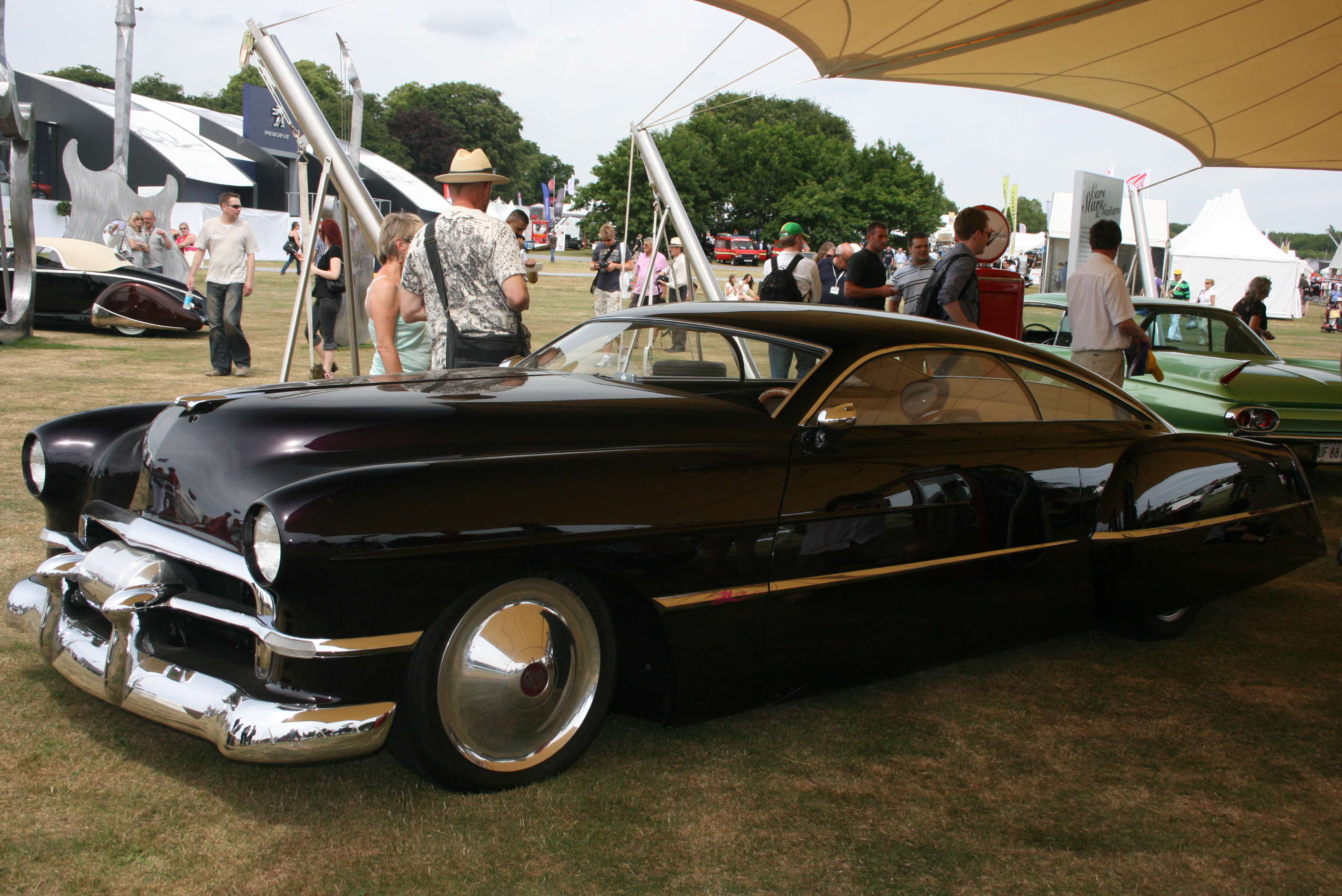
CadZZilla on display at the 2010 Goodwood Festival of Speed

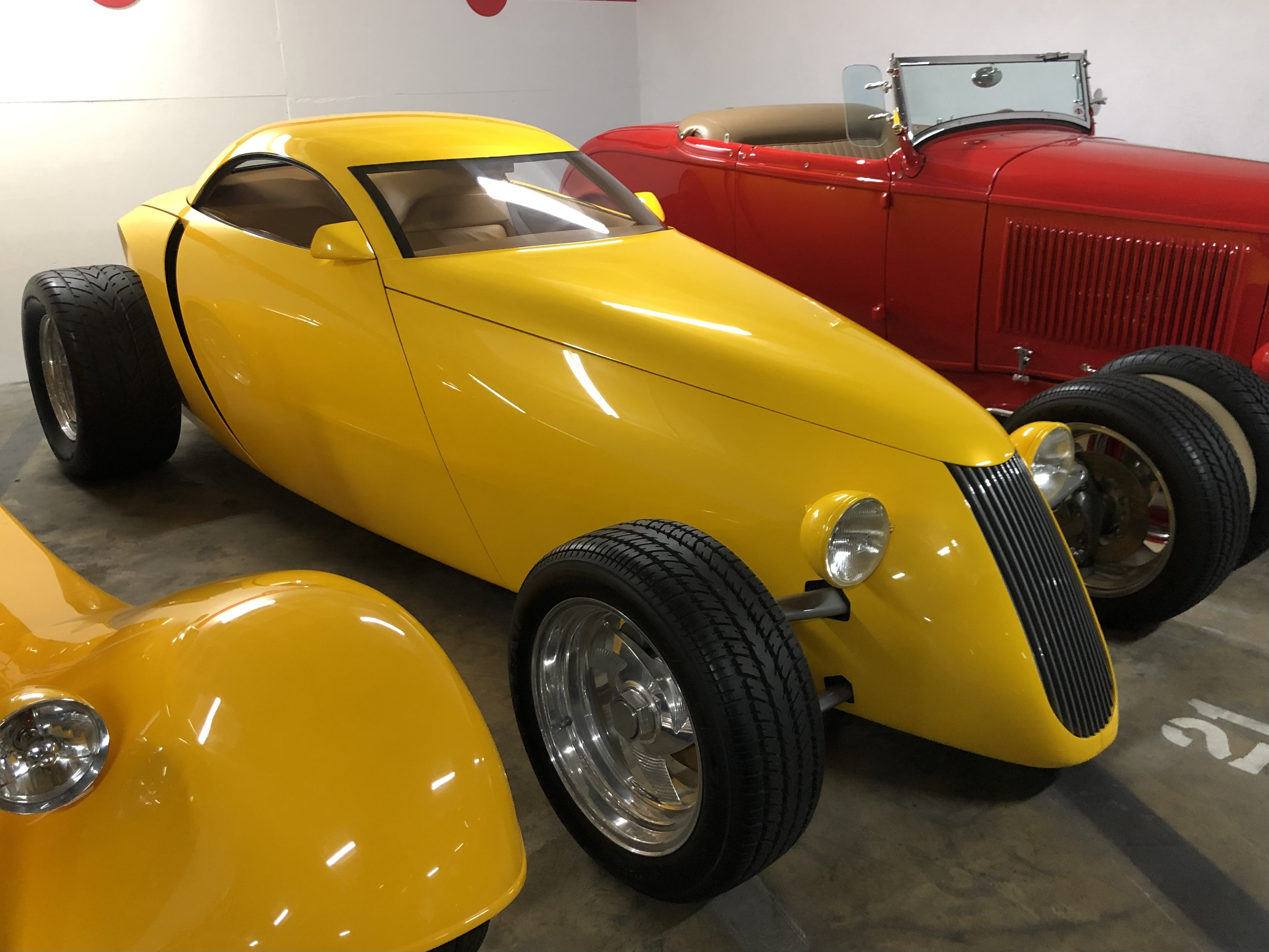
The Alumacoupe, designed by Larry Erickson and built by Boyd Coddington, on display at the Petersen Automotive Museum

In 1989, CadZZilla, a customized 1949 Cadillac, was commissioned by ZZ Top's Billy Gibbons, conceived by Jack Chisenhall and designed by Chisenhall and Larry Erickson. It is acclaimed as one of the great expressions of automotive customization. Columnist Gray Baskerville called CadZZilla "the most incredible transformation he'd ever witnessed", and in their "History of Hot Rods & Customs", the auto editors of Consumer Guide praised it as "the first really new type of custom since the heyday of the 1950s".

== Artistic legacy ==
Many of the next generation of customizers started their careers with Coddington. Larry Erickson, later the chief designer of the Mustang and Thunderbird for Ford Motor Co., worked with Coddington early on, and specifically credits the CadZZilla collaboration for jump-starting his career. Designer Chip Foose (Overhaulin') and fabricator Jesse James (Motorcycle Mania) both started their careers in his shop. Coddington hosted the Discovery Channel show American Hot Rod.

Coddington's creations have won the Grand National Roadster Show's "America's Most Beautiful Roadster" award seven times and the Daimler-Chrysler Design Excellence award twice, and earned him entry into the Grand National Roadster Show Hall of Fame, the SEMA Hall of Fame, the Route 66 Hall of Fame, and the National Rod and Custom Museum Hall of Fame. In 1997, Coddington was inducted into the Hot Rod Hall of Fame.

== Later financial trouble ==
In 1998, financial trouble due to a $465,000 loss from a bankrupt customer led Coddington to reorganize Boyd's Wheels and partner with his eldest son (Boyd Coddington, Jr.).

In his later days, he began registering cars that were essentially completely custom fabrications as antique automobiles, avoiding major emissions restrictions and tax liabilities. California officials considered this a "ship of Theseus" fraud, claiming that so many central elements were replaced, the cars ceased to be the same entity. Coddington was charged with a misdemeanor and pleaded guilty on April 7, 2005.

== Death ==
Coddington was hospitalized on December 31, 2007. He was discharged shortly after New Year's Eve, but was readmitted a few days later to Presbyterian Intercommunity Hospital in Whittier, California. Doctors performed surgery; despite the prognosis of a complete recovery, Coddington died on February 27, 2008. His publicist stated that Coddington was a long-time diabetic, who died from complications that were brought on from a recent surgery for a perforated colon along with sepsis and kidney complications.

Coddington was buried at Rose Hills Memorial Park in Whittier, California.
