= HLA =

HLA commonly refers to human leukocyte antigen, a locus of genes.

It may also refer to:

== Airports ==
- Hacienda Lipangue Airport, Chile
- Huslia Airport (FAA LID: HLA), in Alaska, United States
- Lanseria International Airport (IATA: HLA), near Johannesburg, South Africa

== People ==
- Hla Myint (Brigadier General) (born 1940s), Burmese politician
- Hla Myint (1920–2017), Burmese economist
- Hla Pe (1913–2007), Burmese linguist
- Hla Thaung (died 1949), Burmese soldier
- M.T. Hla (U Tun Hla) (1874–1946), Burmese painter
- Min Saw Hla (1532–1564), king of Arakan
- Sanda Min Hla (died 1363), Chief queen consort of Hanthawaddy
- Saw Min Hla (fl. 1422–1425), Chief queen consort of Ava

== Schools ==
- Heath Lane Academy, in Earl Shilton, Leicestershire, England
- Hidden Lake Academy, in Georgia, United States
- Hillcrest Lutheran Academy, in Minnesota, United States

== Science and technology ==
- High Level Architecture, a distributed computer simulation standard
- High Level Assembly, an Intel 80x86 Assembly Language
- HLA (journal), a scientific journal
- HLA Informatics Group
- Hydraulic Launch Assist, a proprietary regenerative braking system
- Hydraulic lash adjuster, another name for a hydraulic tappet

== Sports ==
- Handball League Australia, an Australian handball league
- Handball Liga Austria, the name of the professional handball league in Austria

== Other ==
- HLA (radio station), a South Korean time signal station
- Half-Life: Alyx, a 2020 video game by Valve
- Halia language, in Papua New Guinea
- Haryana Legislative Assembly, the unicameral state legislature of Haryana state in India
- Hawaii Library Association, professional organization for librarians in Hawaii
- Heilan Home, a Chinese clothing brand
- 2024 Los Angeles Measure HLA, a ballot initiative mandating compliance with the city mobility plan
