= Ford Mighty F-350 =

Concept heavy-duty truck designed by Ford, partnership with Tonka

Ford Mighty F-350 Tonka Truck

Overview
- Manufacturer: Ford
- Model years: 2002

Body and chassis
- Class: Concept heavy-duty pickup truck
- Body style: 4-door crew cab
- Layout: Front-engine, four-wheel-drive

Powertrain
- Engine: 6.0 L Power Stroke turbo-diesel V8
- Transmission: 5-speed 5R110W automatic

The Ford Mighty F-350 is a concept heavy-duty pickup truck designed by Ford and debuted at the 2002 Detroit Auto Show. It was the subject of Ford's first partnership with the Tonka toy truck producer. The Mighty F-350 is equipped with a 350 hp (260 kW) 6.0 L Power Stroke turbo-diesel V8 engine, mated to a 5-speed (5R110W) automatic transmission and hydraulic launch assist. Ford Mighty F-350 styling was used for the production 2004 Ford F-150.

== Design and history ==
High belt line and hood created a tough-looking body.

The 4-bar grille foreshadowed the future 2005–2007 Super Duty models, while the fender badges and chrome side-view mirrors shared a similar appearance to the then-upcoming 2008–2010 model (except there was never a factory full-chrome option). The Mighty F-350's fender flares previewed the 2005 F-450/F-550 trucks as well. Behind its retractable running boards (side steps) are "side exhausts", similar to the second generation F-150 SVT Lightning. The fender badges also use the same font as the production Super Duty models.

The outside also featured LED headlights and taillights, as well as a fifth-wheel trailer hitch in the bed. The vehicle rides over seven feet tall and is equipped with 315/60R22 Goodyear off-road tires (on both the front and dual rear wheels), along with 22-inch wheels.

Though nowhere near as chiseled, the 2008 F-Series Super Duty and 2009 F-150 both inherited some of the Mighty F-350's design language in their exterior styling.

The 6.0 L Power Stroke turbo-diesel V8 made it to production as well.

== See also ==
- Ford F-250 Super Chief, a similar concept truck also designed by Ford
- Tonka, the toy manufacturer whose products inspired the Mighty F-350

== Sources ==
- Ackerson, R. (2005). Ford F-150 Pickup 1997-2005: America's Best-Selling Truck. Veloce Publishing Limited. ISBN 978-1-904788-86-7.
- Stewart, Ben (August 2002). "In-Your-Face Pickups". Popular Mechanics. 179 (8). Hearst Magazines: 74–77. ISSN 0032-4558.
- Automotive News. Crain Automotive Group. 2003.
- Higgins, A.; Koucky, S. (2002). "Cleaner and beefier diesel engine". Machine Design. 74 (9): 31–32.
