= Hybrid vehicle =

Vehicle using two or more power sources

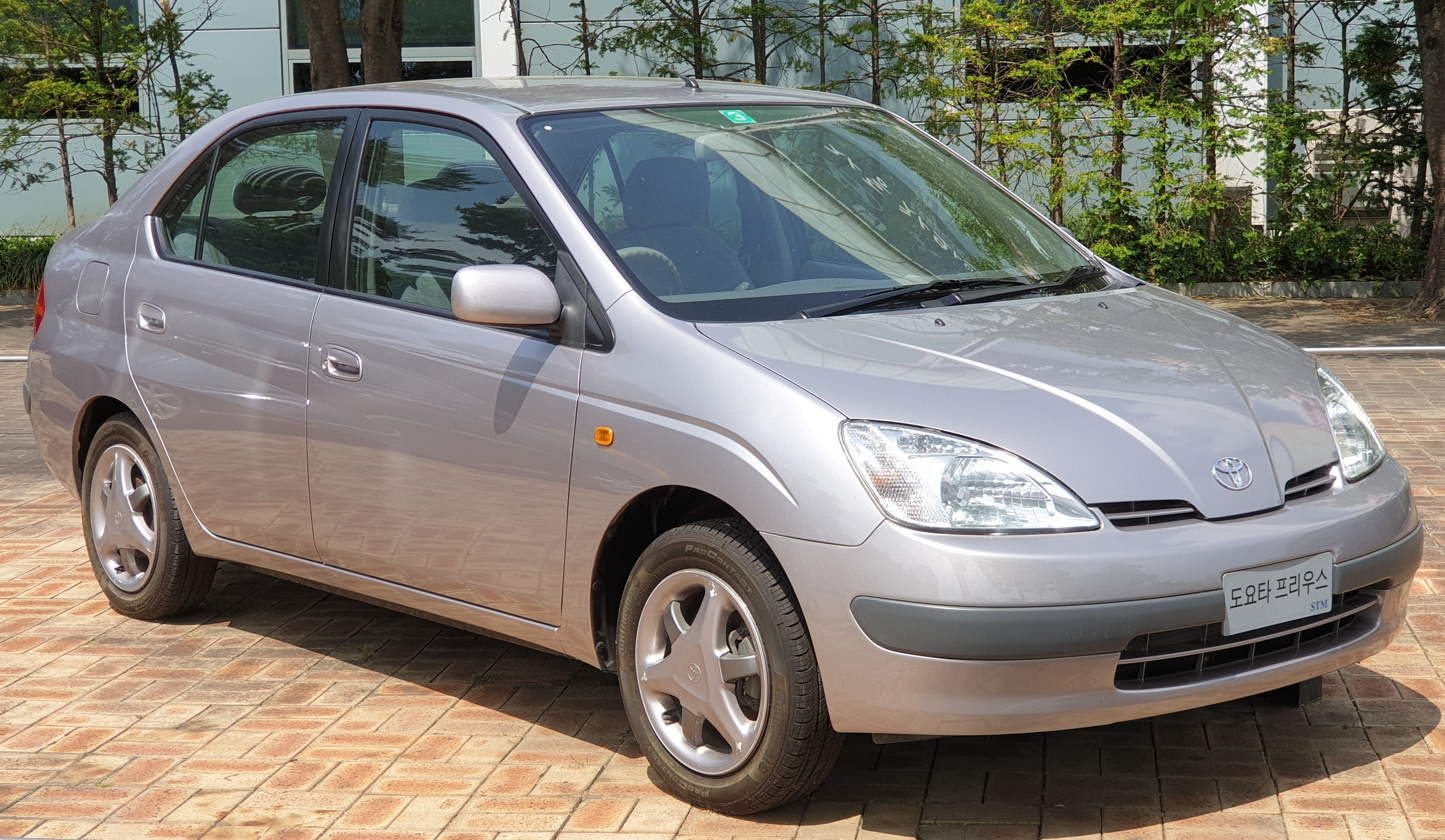
The 1997–2000 Toyota Prius NHW10, the world's first mass-produced hybrid electric car

A hybrid vehicle is a vehicle that uses two or more distinct types of power. Examples include cars that use both an internal combustion engine and an electric engine, or submarines that use diesel when surfaced and electric batteries when submerged. Other means to store energy include pressurized fluid in hydraulic hybrids.

Hybrid powertrains are designed to switch from one power source to another to maximize both fuel efficiency and energy efficiency. In hybrid electric vehicles, for instance, the electric motor is more efficient at producing torque, or turning power, while the combustion engine is better for maintaining high speed. Improved efficiency, lower emissions, and reduced running costs relative to non-hybrid vehicles are three primary benefits of hybridization.

== Vehicle types ==
=== Two-wheeled and cycle-type vehicles ===
Mopeds, electric bicycles, and even electric kick scooters are a simple form of a hybrid, powered by an internal combustion engine or electric motor and the rider's muscles. Early prototype motorcycles in the late 19th century used the same principle.

- In a parallel hybrid bicycle, human and motor torques are mechanically coupled at the pedal or one of the wheels, e.g. using a hub motor, a roller pressing onto a tire, or a connection to a wheel using a transmission element. Most motorized bicycles, mopeds are of this type.
- In a series hybrid bicycle (SHB), a kind of chainless bicycle, the user pedals a generator, charging a battery or feeding the motor, which delivers all of the torque required. They are commercially available, being simple in theory and manufacturing.

The first published prototype of an SHB was by Augustus Kinzel (US Patent 3'884'317) in 1975. In 1994, Bernie Macdonalds conceived the Electrilite SHB with power electronics allowing regenerative braking and pedaling while stationary. In 1995 Thomas Muller designed and built a "Fahrrad mit elektromagnetischem Antrieb" for his 1995 diploma thesis. In 1996 Jürg Blatter and Andreas Fuchs of Berne University of Applied Sciences built an SHB and in 1998 modified a Leitra tricycle (European patent EP 1165188). Until 2005 they built several prototype SH tricycles and quadricycles. In 1999 Harald Kutzke described an "active bicycle": the aim is to approach the ideal bicycle weighing nothing and having no drag by electronic compensation.

- A series hybrid electric–petroleum bicycle (SHEPB) is powered by pedals, batteries, a petrol generator, or plug-in charger—providing flexibility and range enhancements over electric-only bicycles.

An SHEPB prototype made by David Kitson in Australia in 2014 used a lightweight brushless DC electric motor from an aerial drone and small hand-tool sized internal combustion engine, and a 3D printed drive system and lightweight housing, altogether weighing less than 4.5 kg. Active cooling keeps plastic parts from softening. The prototype uses a regular electric bicycle charge port.

=== Heavy vehicle ===
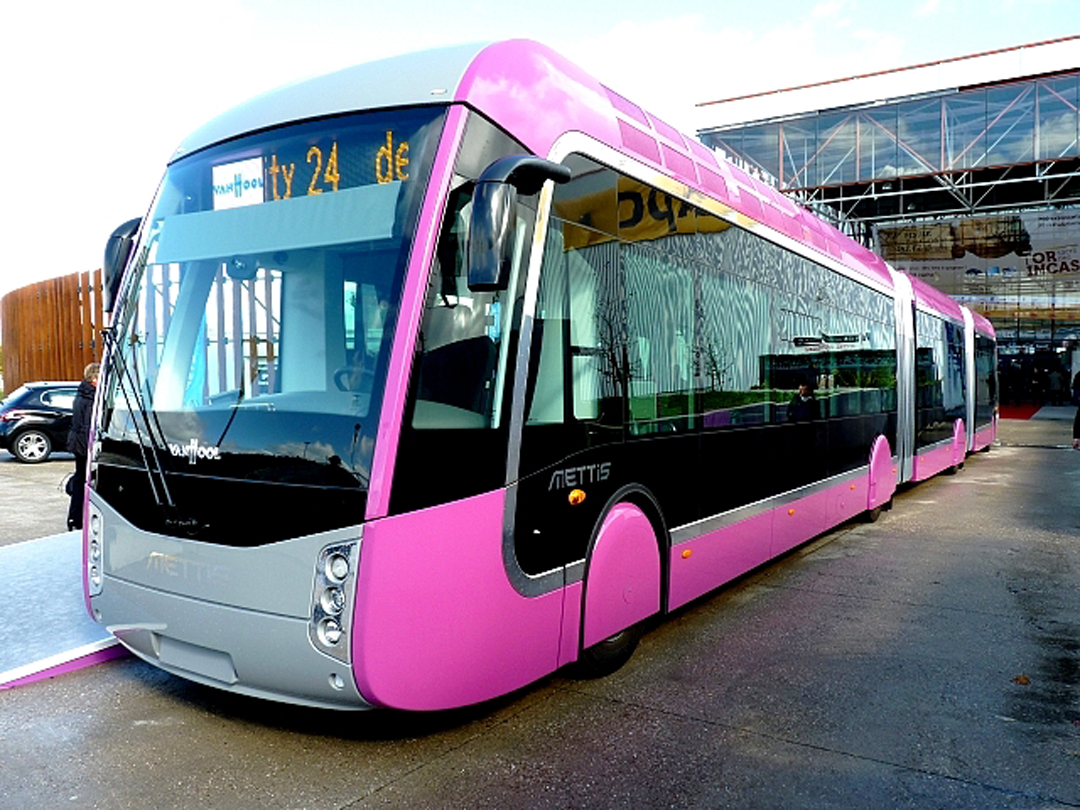
Bus rapid transit of Metz, a diesel–electric hybrid driving system by Van Hool

Hybrid power trains use diesel–electric or turbo-electric to power railway locomotives, buses, heavy goods vehicles, mobile hydraulic machinery, and ships. A diesel/turbine engine drives an electric generator or hydraulic pump, which powers electric/hydraulic motors—strictly an electric/hydraulic transmission (not a hybrid), unless it can accept power from outside. With large vehicles, conversion losses decrease and the advantages in distributing power through wires or pipes rather than mechanical elements become more prominent, especially when powering multiple drives—e.g. driven wheels or propellers. Until recently most heavy vehicles had little secondary energy storage, e.g. batteries/hydraulic accumulators—excepting non-nuclear submarines, one of the oldest production hybrids, running on diesel while surfaced and batteries when submerged. Both series and parallel setups were used in World War II-era submarines.

==== Rail transport ====
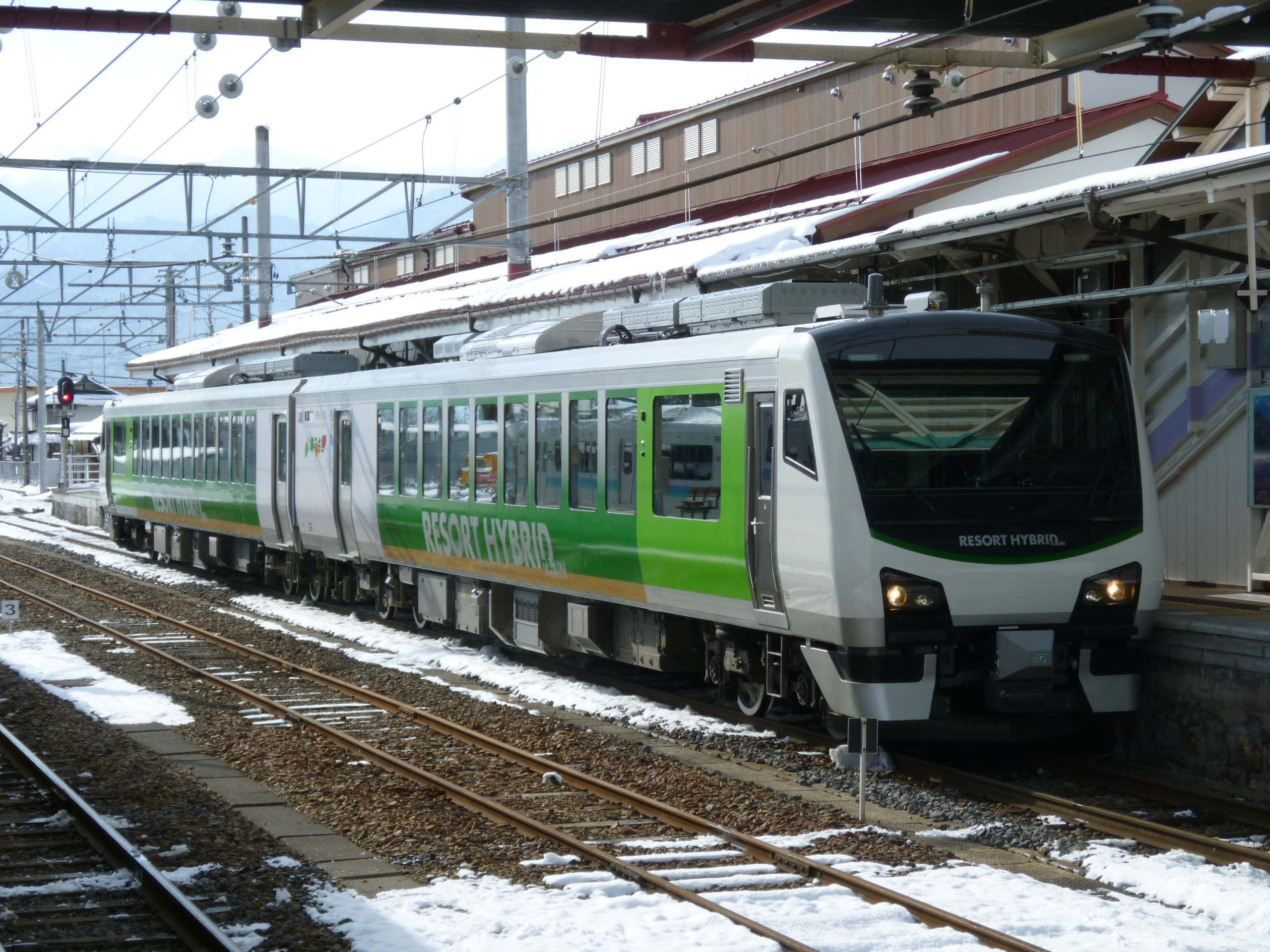
East Japan Railway Company HB-E300 series

===== Europe =====
The new Autorail à grande capacité (AGC or high-capacity railcar) built by the Canadian company Bombardier for service in France is diesel/electric motors, using 1500 or 25,000 V on different rail systems. It was tested in Rotterdam, the Netherlands with Railfeeding, a Genesee & Wyoming company.

===== China =====
The first hybrid evaluation locomotive was designed by the rail research center Matrai in 1999 and was built in 2000. It was an EMD G12 locomotive upgraded with batteries, a 200 kW diesel generator, and four AC motors.

===== Japan =====
Japan's first hybrid train with significant energy storage is the KiHa E200, with roof-mounted lithium-ion batteries.

===== India =====
Indian railway launched one of its kind CNG-Diesel hybrid trains in January 2015. The train has a 1400 hp engine which uses fumigation technology. The first of these trains was scheduled to run on the 81 km Rewari–Rohtak route. CNG is a less-polluting alternative for diesel and petrol and is popular as an alternative fuel in India. Already many transport vehicles such as auto-rickshaws and buses run on CNG fuel.

===== North America =====
In the US, General Electric made a locomotive with sodium–nickel chloride (Na−NiCl_{2}) battery storage. They expect a greater than 10% improvement in the fuel economy.

Variant diesel electric locomotive include the Green Goat (GG) and Green Kid (GK) switching/yard engines built by Canada's Railpower Technologies, with lead acid (Pba) batteries and 1000 to 2000 hp electric motors, and a new clean-burning ≈160 hp diesel generator. No fuel is wasted for idling: ≈60–85% of the time for these types of locomotives. It is unclear if regenerative braking is used; but in principle, it is easily utilized.

Since these engines typically require additional weight for traction, the weight of the battery pack represents only a negligible penalty. The diesel generator and batteries are normally built on an existing "retired" "yard" locomotive's frame. The existing motors and running gear are all rebuilt and reused. Fuel savings of 40–60% and up to 80% pollution reductions are claimed over a "typical" older switching/yard engine. The advantages hybrid cars have for frequent starts and stops and idle periods apply to typical switching yard use. "Green Goat" locomotives have been purchased by Canadian Pacific, BNSF, Kansas City Southern Railway and Union Pacific among others.

==== Cranes ====
Railpower Technologies engineers working with TSI Terminal Systems are testing a hybrid diesel–electric power unit with battery storage for use in Rubber Tyred Gantry (RTG) cranes. RTG cranes are typically used for loading and unloading shipping containers onto trains or trucks in ports and container storage yards. The energy used to lift the containers can be partially regained when they are lowered. Diesel fuel and emission reductions of 50–70% are predicted by Railpower engineers. First systems are expected to be operational in 2007.

==== Road transport, commercial vehicles ====
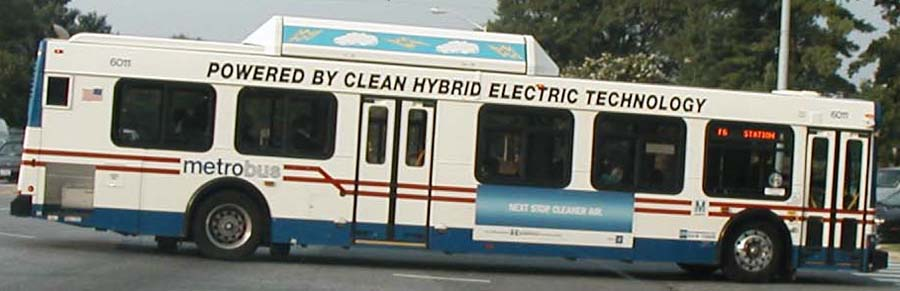
A hybrid New Flyer bus used by Metrobus in Washington, D.C.

Hybrid systems are regularly in use for trucks, buses and other heavy highway vehicles. Small fleet sizes and installation costs are compensated by fuel savings, with advances such as higher capacity, lowered battery cost, etc. Toyota, Ford, GM and others are introducing hybrid pickups and SUVs. Kenworth Truck Company recently introduced the Kenworth T270 Class 6 that for city usage seems to be competitive. FedEx and others are investing in hybrid delivery vehicles—particularly for city use where hybrid technology may pay off first. As of December 2013 FedEx is trialling two delivery trucks with Wrightspeed electric motors and diesel generators; the retrofit kits are claimed to pay for themselves in a few years. The diesel engines run at a constant RPM for peak efficiency.

In 1978 students at Minneapolis, Minnesota's Hennepin Vocational Technical Center, converted a Volkswagen Beetle to a petro-hydraulic hybrid with off-the shelf components. A car rated at 32 mpg was returning 75 mpg with the 60 hp engine replaced by a 16 hp engine, and reached 70 mph.

In the 1990s, engineers at EPA's National Vehicle and Fuel Emissions Laboratory developed a petro-hydraulic powertrain for a typical American sedan car. The test car achieved over 80 mpg on combined EPA city/highway driving cycles. Acceleration was 0-60 mph in 8 seconds, using a 1.9-liter diesel engine. No lightweight materials were used. The EPA estimated that produced in high volumes the hydraulic components would add only $700 to the cost. Under EPA testing, a hydraulic hybrid Ford Expedition returned 32 mpg (7.4 L/100 km) City, and 22 mpg (11 L/100 km) highway. UPS currently has two trucks in service using this technology.

==== Military off-road vehicles ====
Since 1985, the US military has been testing serial hybrid Humvees and have found them to deliver faster acceleration, a stealth mode with low thermal signature, near silent operation, and greater fuel economy.

==== Ships ====
Ships with both mast-mounted sails and steam engines were an early form of a hybrid vehicle. Another example is the diesel–electric submarine. This runs on batteries when submerged and the batteries can be recharged by the diesel engine when the craft is on the surface.

As of 2022, there are 550 ships with an average of 1.6 MWh of batteries. The average was 500 kWh in 2016.

Newer hybrid ship-propulsion schemes include large towing kites manufactured by companies such as SkySails. Towing kites can fly at heights several times higher than the tallest ship masts, capturing stronger and steadier winds.

==== Aircraft ====
The Boeing Fuel Cell Demonstrator Airplane has a Proton-Exchange Membrane (PEM) fuel cell/lithium-ion battery hybrid system to power an electric motor, which is coupled to a conventional propeller. The fuel cell provides all power for the cruise phase of flight. During takeoff and climb, the flight segment that requires the most power, the system draws on lightweight lithium-ion batteries.

The demonstrator aircraft is a Dimona motor glider, built by Diamond Aircraft Industries of Austria, which also carried out structural modifications to the aircraft. With a wingspan of 16.3 meters (53 feet), the airplane will be able to cruise at about 100 km/h (62 mph) on power from the fuel cell.

Hybrid FanWings have been designed. A FanWing is created by two engines with the capability to autorotate and landing like a helicopter.

== Engine type ==
=== Hybrid electric-petroleum vehicles ===
A 2023 Honda CR-V Hybrid Sport approaching a gas station in California. Hybrid electric vehicles became increasingly popular in the 2020s amid improving technology, environmental concerns relating to car emissions, and fluctuating fuel prices.

In common use, "hybrid vehicle" most often refers to a hybrid electric vehicle. A petroleum-electric hybrid, or gasoline-electric hybrid, most commonly uses internal combustion engines (using a variety of fuels, generally gasoline or diesel engines) and electric motors to power the vehicle. The energy is stored in the fuel of the internal combustion engine and an electric battery set. There are many types of hybrid vehicle drivetrain, generally ranging from full hybrid to mild hybrid, which offer varying advantages and disadvantages.

Hybrid electric vehicles encompass a wide range of car models, both those designed as hybrid models (e.g. Toyota Prius, Honda Insight), and hybrid variants of existing models that often also have internal-combustion models (e.g. Ford Maverick, Hyundai Elantra).

William H. Patton filed a patent application for a gasoline-electric hybrid rail-car propulsion system in early 1889, and for a similar hybrid boat propulsion system in mid-1889; There is no evidence that his hybrid boat met with any success, but he built a prototype hybrid tram and sold a small hybrid locomotive. In 1899, Henri Pieper developed the world's first petro-electric hybrid automobile. In 1900, Ferdinand Porsche developed a series hybrid using two motor-in-wheel-hub arrangements with an internal combustion generator set providing the electric power; Porsche's hybrid set two-speed records. While liquid fuel/electric hybrids date back to the late 19th century, the braking regenerative hybrid was invented in 1978 by David Arthurs, an electrical engineer from Springdale, Arkansas, who home-converted his Opel GT to return as much as 75 mpg and sold plans for similar conversions. After numerous concept car hybrids produced by numerous automakers throughout the late 20th century, the Toyota Prius, first sold in Japan in 1997, became the first mass-produced and mass-marketed hybrid electric vehicle.

The plug-in hybrid electric vehicle (PHEV) is becoming increasingly common as a type of hybrid electric vehicle model. Taking cues from the electric car, PHEVs provide the range needed in locations where there are wide gaps with no services. The batteries can be plugged into house electrical mains for charging, and can be charged while the engine is running.

=== Continuously outboard recharged electric vehicle ===
Some battery electric vehicles can be recharged while the user drives. Such a vehicle establishes contact with an electrified rail, plate, or overhead wires on the highway via an attached conducting wheel or other similar mechanisms (see conduit current collection). The vehicle's batteries are recharged by this process—on the highway—and can then be used normally on other roads until the battery is discharged. For example, some of the battery-electric locomotives used for maintenance trains on the London Underground are capable of this mode of operation.

Developing an infrastructure for battery electric vehicles would provide the advantage of virtually unrestricted highway range. Since many destinations are within 100 km of a major highway, this technology could reduce the need for expensive battery systems. However, private use of the existing electrical system is almost universally prohibited. Besides, the technology for such electrical infrastructure is largely outdated and, outside some cities, not widely distributed (see Conduit current collection, trams, electric rail, trolleys, third rail). Updating the required electrical and infrastructure costs could perhaps be funded by toll revenue or by dedicated transportation taxes.

=== Hybrid fuel (dual mode) ===
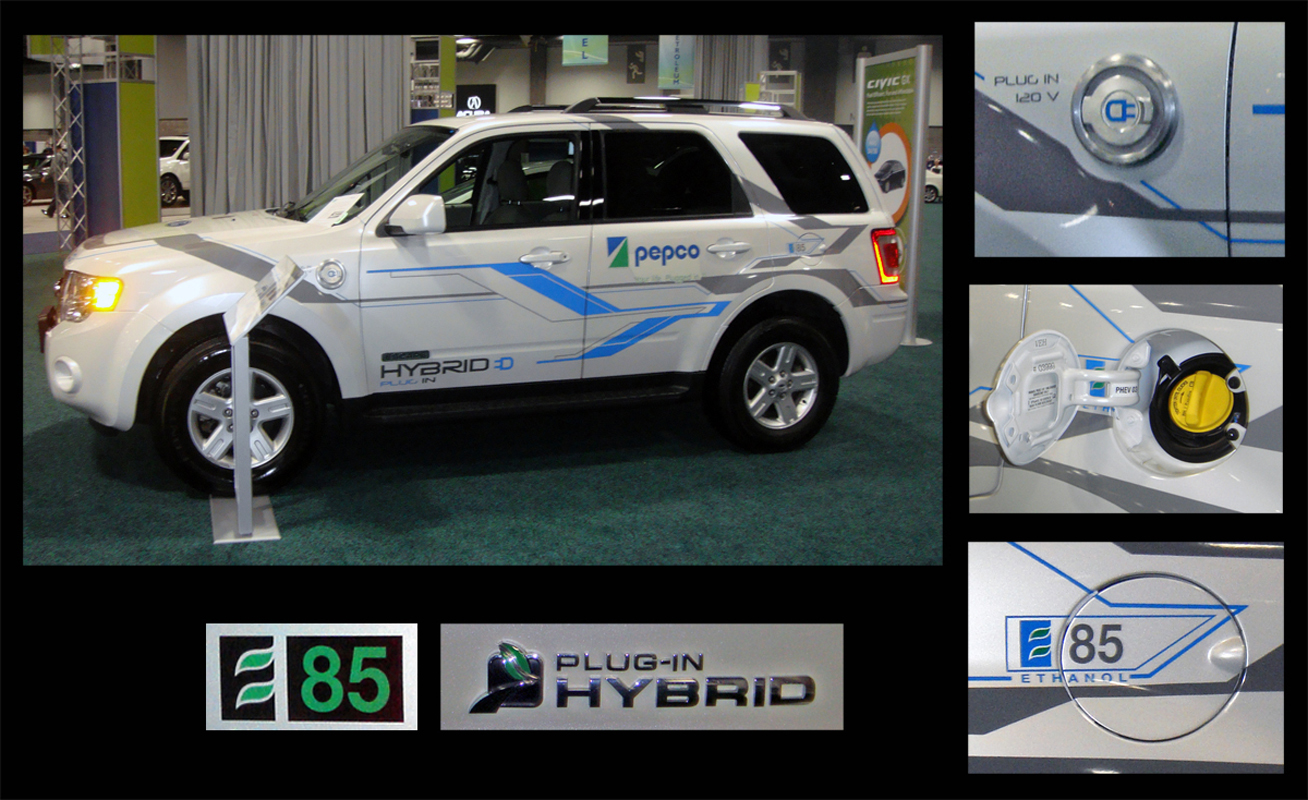
Ford Escape Plug-in Hybrid with a flexible fuel capability to run on E85 (ethanol)

In addition to vehicles that use two or more different devices for propulsion, some also consider vehicles that use distinct energy sources or input types ("fuels") using the same engine to be hybrids, although to avoid confusion with hybrids as described above and to use correctly the terms, these are perhaps more correctly described as dual mode vehicles:

- Some trolleybuses can switch between an onboard diesel engine and overhead electrical power depending on conditions (see dual-mode bus). In principle, this could be combined with a battery subsystem to create a true plug-in hybrid trolleybus, although as of 2006, no such design seems to have been announced.
- Flexible-fuel vehicles can use a mixture of input fuels mixed in one tank—typically gasoline and ethanol, methanol, or biobutanol.
- Bi-fuel vehicle: Liquified petroleum gas and natural gas are very different from petroleum or diesel and cannot be used in the same tanks, so it would be challenging to build an (LPG or NG) flexible fuel system. Instead vehicles are built with two, parallel, fuel systems feeding one engine. For example, some Chevrolet Silverado 2500 HDs can effortlessly switch between petroleum and natural gas, offering a range of over 1000 km (650 miles). While the duplicated tanks cost space in some applications, the increased range, decreased cost of fuel, and flexibility where LPG or CNG infrastructure is incomplete may be a significant incentive to purchase. While the US Natural gas infrastructure is partially incomplete, it is increasing and in 2013 had 2600 CNG stations in place. Rising gas prices may push consumers to purchase these vehicles. In 2013 when gas prices traded around US$1.1 per litre ($4.0/US gal), the price of gasoline was US$95.5 per megawatt-hour ($28.00 per million British thermal units), compared to natural gas's $13.6/MWh ($4.00 per million British thermal units). On a per unit of energy comparative basis, this makes natural gas much cheaper than gasoline.
- Some vehicles have been modified to use another fuel source if it is available, such as cars modified to run on autogas (LPG) and diesels modified to run on waste vegetable oil that has not been processed into biodiesel.
- Power-assist mechanisms for bicycles and other human-powered vehicles are also included (see Motorized bicycle).

=== Fluid power hybrid ===
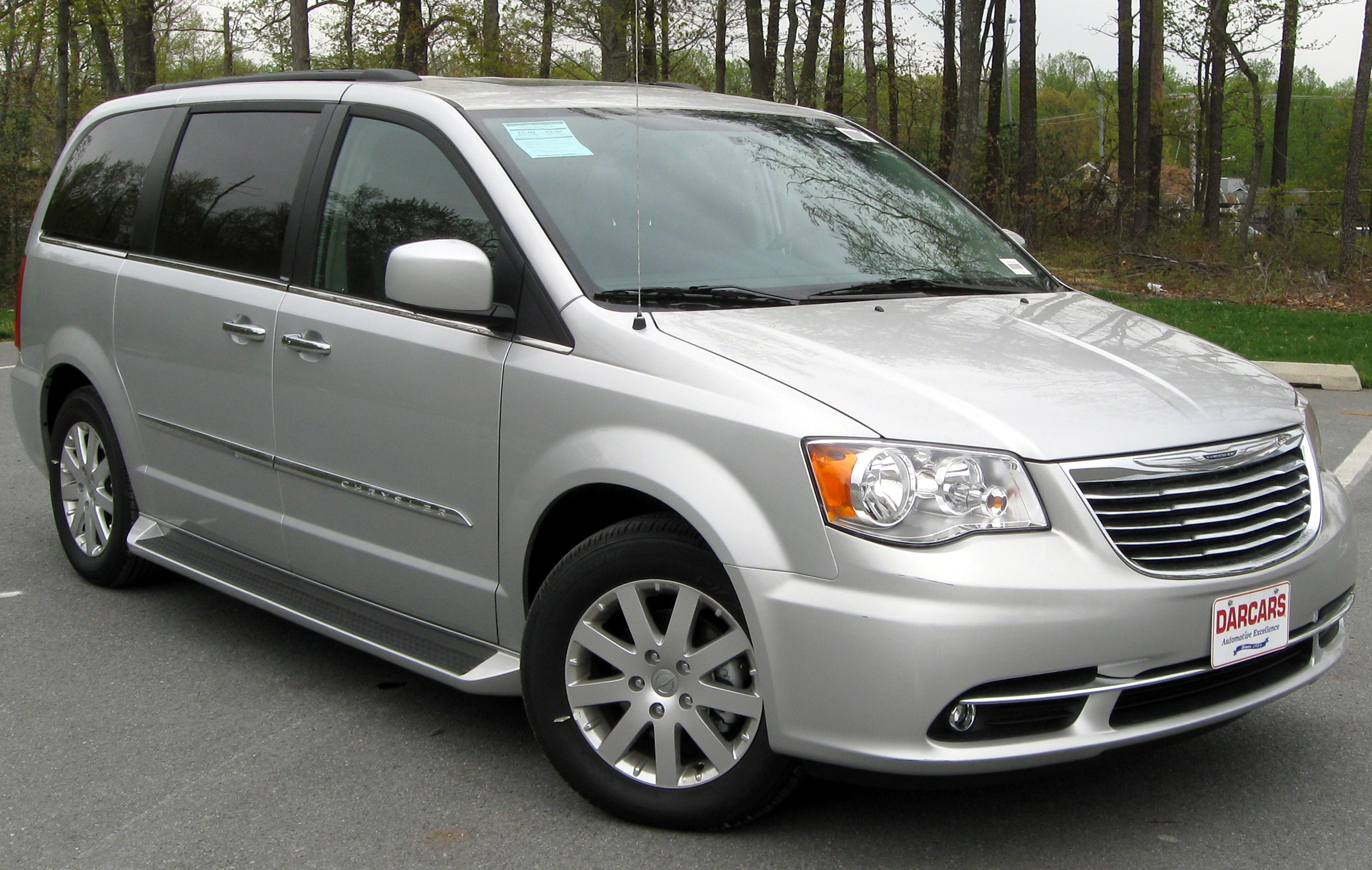
A Chrysler Town & Country, a petro-hydraulic hybrid vehicle

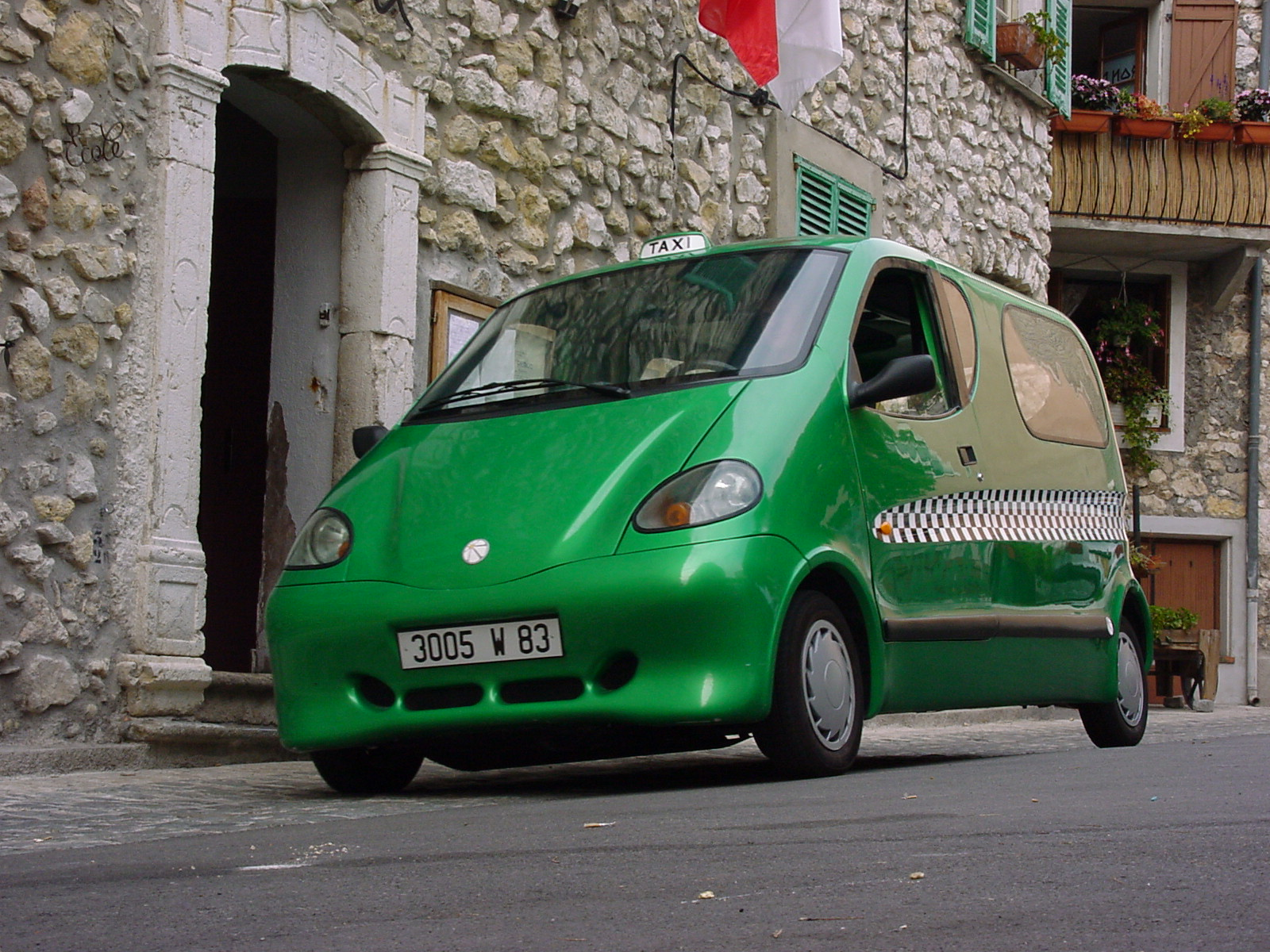
Motor Development International petro-air hybrid car developed with Tata Motors

Hydraulic hybrid and pneumatic hybrid vehicles use an engine or regenerative braking (or both) to charge a pressure accumulator to drive the wheels via hydraulic (liquid) or pneumatic (compressed gas) drive units. In most cases the engine is detached from the drivetrain, serving solely to charge the energy accumulator. The transmission is seamless. Regenerative braking can be used to recover some of the supplied drive energy back into the accumulator.

==== Petro-air hybrid ====
A French company, MDI, has designed and has running models of a petro-air hybrid engine car. The system does not use air motors to drive the vehicle, being directly driven by a hybrid engine. The engine uses a mixture of compressed air and gasoline injected into the cylinders. A key aspect of the hybrid engine is the "active chamber", which is a compartment heating air via fuel doubling the energy output. Tata Motors of India assessed the design phase towards full production for the Indian market and moved into "completing detailed development of the compressed air engine into specific vehicle and stationary applications".

==== Petro-hydraulic hybrid ====
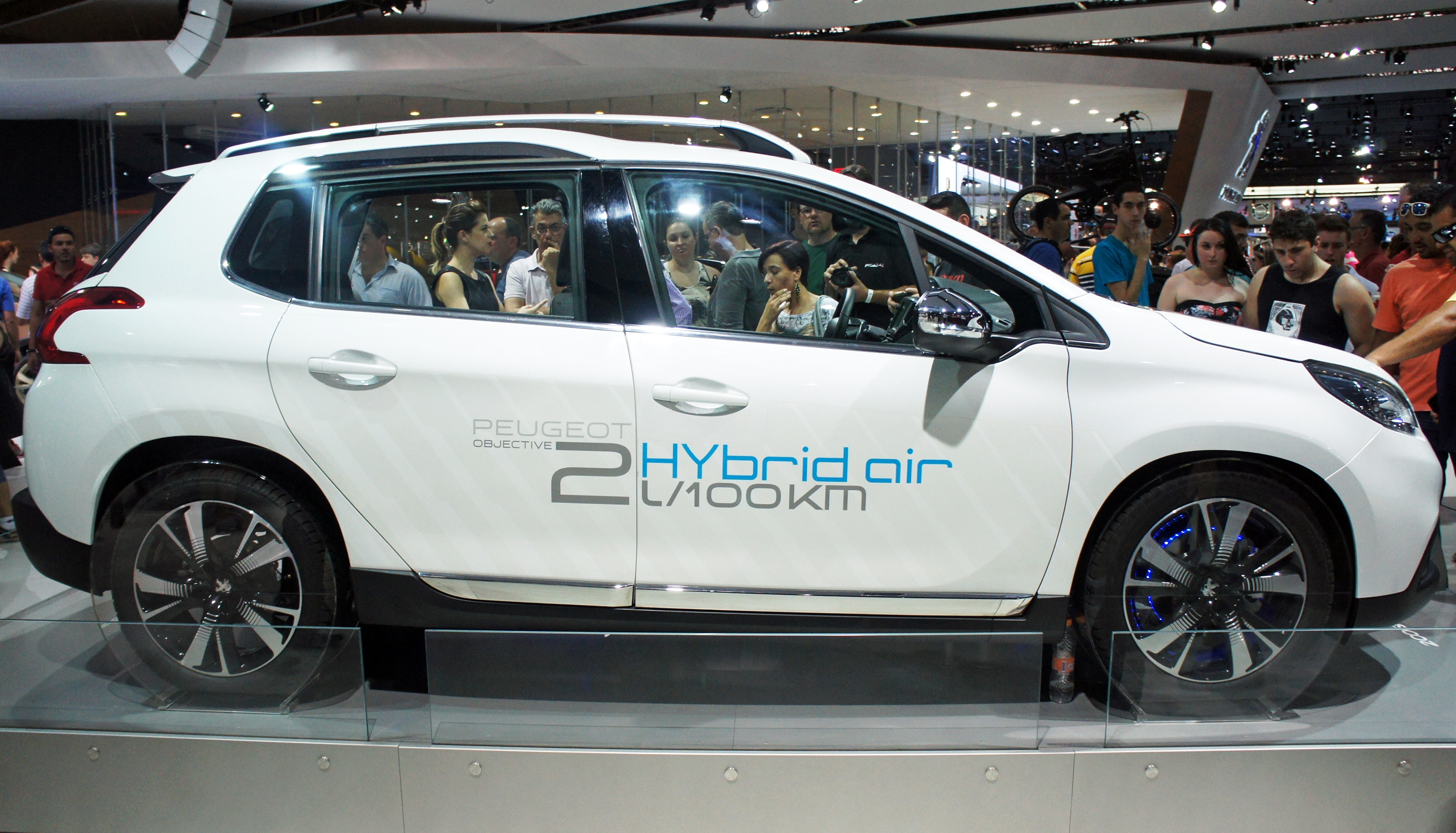
Peugeot 2008 HYbrid air/hydraulic concept car

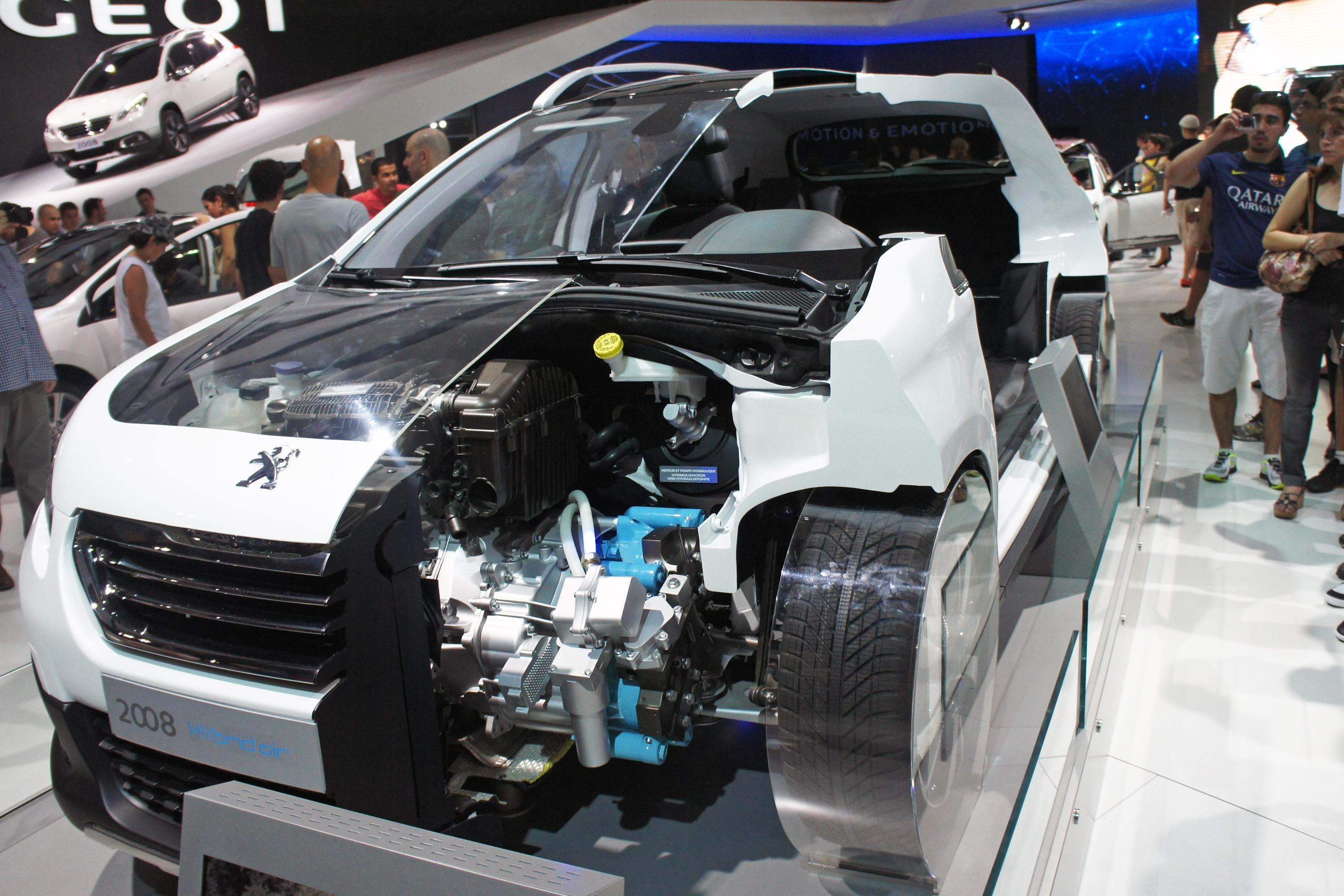
Peugeot 2008 HYbrid air/hydraulic cutaway

Petro-hydraulic configurations have been common in trains and heavy vehicles for decades. The auto industry recently focused on this hybrid configuration as it now shows promise for introduction into smaller vehicles.

In petro-hydraulic hybrids, the energy recovery rate is high and therefore the system is more efficient than electric battery charged hybrids using the current electric battery technology, demonstrating a 60% to 70% increase in energy economy in US Environmental Protection Agency (EPA) testing. The charging engine needs only to be sized for average usage with acceleration bursts using the stored energy in the hydraulic accumulator, which is charged when in low energy demanding vehicle operation. The charging engine runs at optimum speed and load for efficiency and longevity. Under tests undertaken by the US Environmental Protection Agency (EPA), a hydraulic hybrid Ford Expedition returned 32 miles per US gallon (7.4 L/100 km; 38 mpg_{‑imp}) City, and 22 miles per US gallon (11 L/100 km; 26 mpg_{‑imp}) highway. UPS currently has two trucks in service using this technology.

Although petro-hydraulic hybrid technology has been known for decades and used in trains as well as very large construction vehicles, the high costs of the equipment precluded the systems from lighter trucks and cars. In the modern sense, an experiment proved the viability of small petro-hydraulic hybrid road vehicles in 1978. A group of students at Minneapolis, Minnesota's Hennepin Vocational Technical Center, converted a Volkswagen Beetle car to run as a petro-hydraulic hybrid using off-the-shelf components. A car rated at 32 mpg_{‑US} (7.4 L/100 km; 38 mpg_{‑imp}) was returning 75 mpg_{‑US} (3.1 L/100 km; 90 mpg_{‑imp}) with the 60 hp engine replaced by a 16 hp engine. The experimental car reached 70 mph (110 km/h).

In the 1990s, a team of engineers working at EPA's National Vehicle and Fuel Emissions Laboratory succeeded in developing a revolutionary type of petro-hydraulic hybrid powertrain that would propel a typical American sedan car. The test car achieved over 80 mpg on combined EPA city/highway driving cycles. Acceleration was 0-60 mph in 8 seconds, using a 1.9 L diesel engine. No lightweight materials were used. The EPA estimated that produced in high volumes the hydraulic components would add only $700 to the base cost of the vehicle.

The petro-hydraulic hybrid system has a faster and more efficient charge/discharge cycling than petro-electric hybrids and is also cheaper to build. The accumulator vessel size dictates total energy storage capacity and may require more space than an electric battery set. Any vehicle space consumed by a larger size of accumulator vessel may be offset by the need for a smaller sized charging engine, in HP and physical size.

Research is underway in large corporations and small companies. The focus has now switched to smaller vehicles. The system components were expensive which precluded installation in smaller trucks and cars. A drawback was that the power driving motors were not efficient enough at part load. A British company (Artemis Intelligent Power) made a breakthrough introducing an electronically controlled hydraulic motor/pump, the Digital Displacement® motor/pump. The pump is highly efficient at all speed ranges and loads, giving feasibility to small applications of petro-hydraulic hybrids. The company converted a BMW car as a test bed to prove viability. The BMW 530i gave double the mpg in city driving compared to the standard car. This test was using the standard 3,000 cc engine, with a smaller engine the figures would have been more impressive. The design of petro-hydraulic hybrids using well sized accumulators allows downsizing an engine to average power usage, not peak power usage. Peak power is provided by the energy stored in the accumulator. A smaller more efficient constant speed engine reduces weight and liberates space for a larger accumulator.

Current vehicle bodies are designed around the mechanicals of existing engine/transmission setups. It is restrictive and far from ideal to install petro-hydraulic mechanicals into existing bodies not designed for hydraulic setups. One research project's goal is to create a blank paper design new car, to maximize the packaging of petro-hydraulic hybrid components in the vehicle. All bulky hydraulic components are integrated into the chassis of the car. One design has claimed to return 130 mpg in tests by using a large hydraulic accumulator which is also the structural chassis of the car. The small hydraulic driving motors are incorporated within the wheel hubs driving the wheels and reversing to claw-back kinetic braking energy. The hub motors eliminate the need for friction brakes, mechanical transmissions, driveshafts, and U-joints, reducing costs and weight. Hydrostatic drive with no friction brakes is used in industrial vehicles. The aim is 170 mpg in average driving conditions. The energy created by shock absorbers and kinetic braking energy that normally would be wasted assists in charging the accumulator. A small fossil-fuelled piston engine sized for average power use charges the accumulator. The accumulator is sized at running the car for 15 minutes when fully charged. The aim is a fully charged accumulator that will produce a 0-60 mph acceleration speed of under 5 seconds using four wheel drive.

In January 2011 industry giant Chrysler announced a partnership with the US Environmental Protection Agency (EPA) to design and develop an experimental petro-hydraulic hybrid powertrain suitable for use in large passenger cars. In 2012 an existing production minivan was adapted to the new hydraulic powertrain for assessment.

PSA Peugeot Citroën exhibited an experimental "Hybrid Air" engine at the 2013 Geneva Motor Show. The vehicle uses nitrogen gas compressed by energy harvested from braking or deceleration to power a hydraulic drive which supplements power from its conventional gasoline engine. The hydraulic and electronic components were supplied by Robert Bosch GmbH. Mileage was estimated to be about 118 mpg_{‑US} (2 L/100 km; 142 mpg_{‑imp}) on the Euro test cycle if installed in a Citroën C3 type of body. PSA Although the car was ready for production and was proven and feasible delivering the claimed results, Peugeot Citroën were unable to attract a major manufacturer to share the high development costs and are shelving the project until a partnership can be arranged.

=== Electric-human power hybrid vehicle ===
Another form of a hybrid vehicle are the human-powered electric vehicles. These include such vehicles as the Sinclair C5, Twike, electric bicycles, electric skateboards, electric motorcycles, and scooters.

== Hybrid vehicle power train configurations ==
=== Parallel hybrid ===
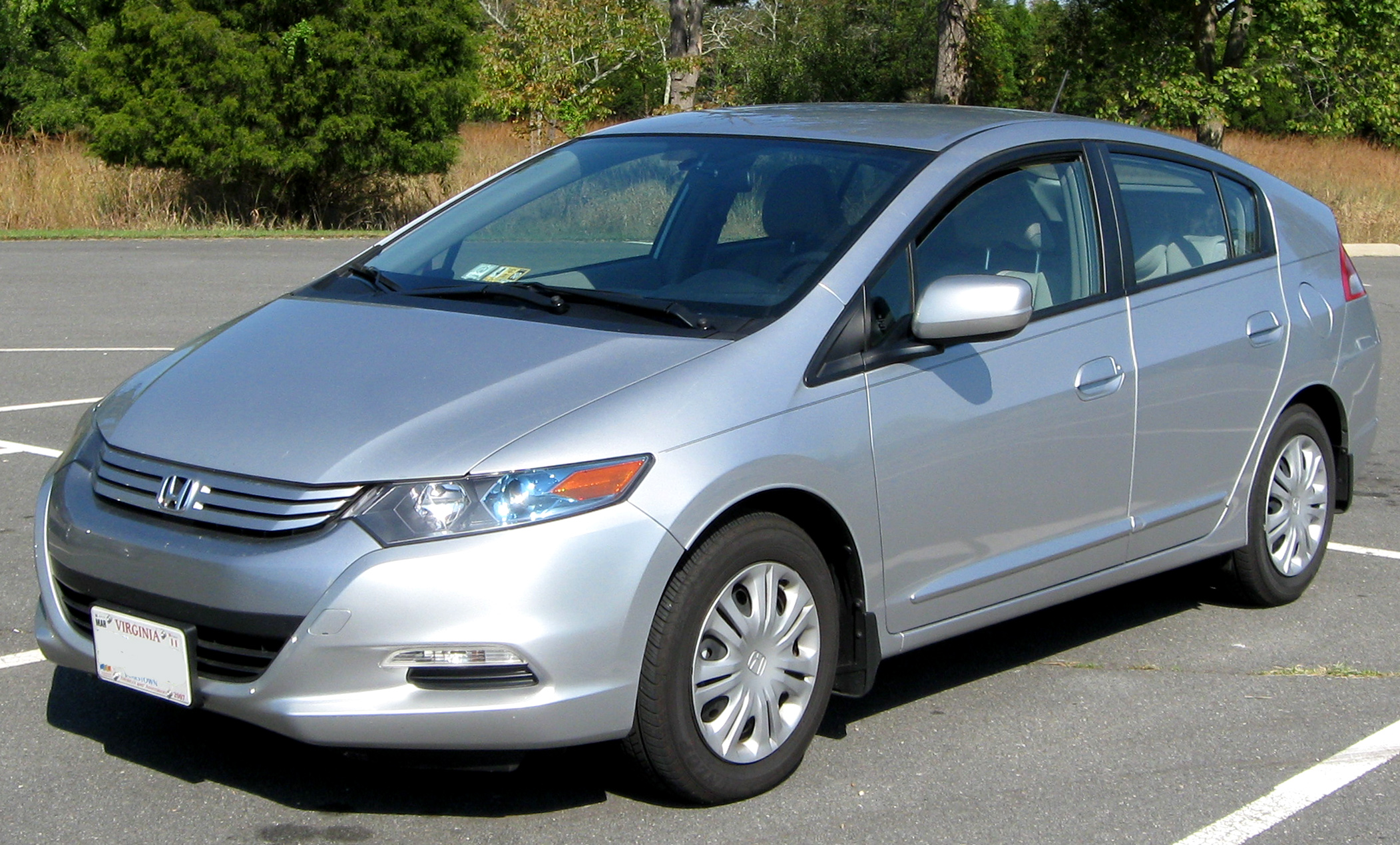
Honda Insight, a mild parallel hybrid

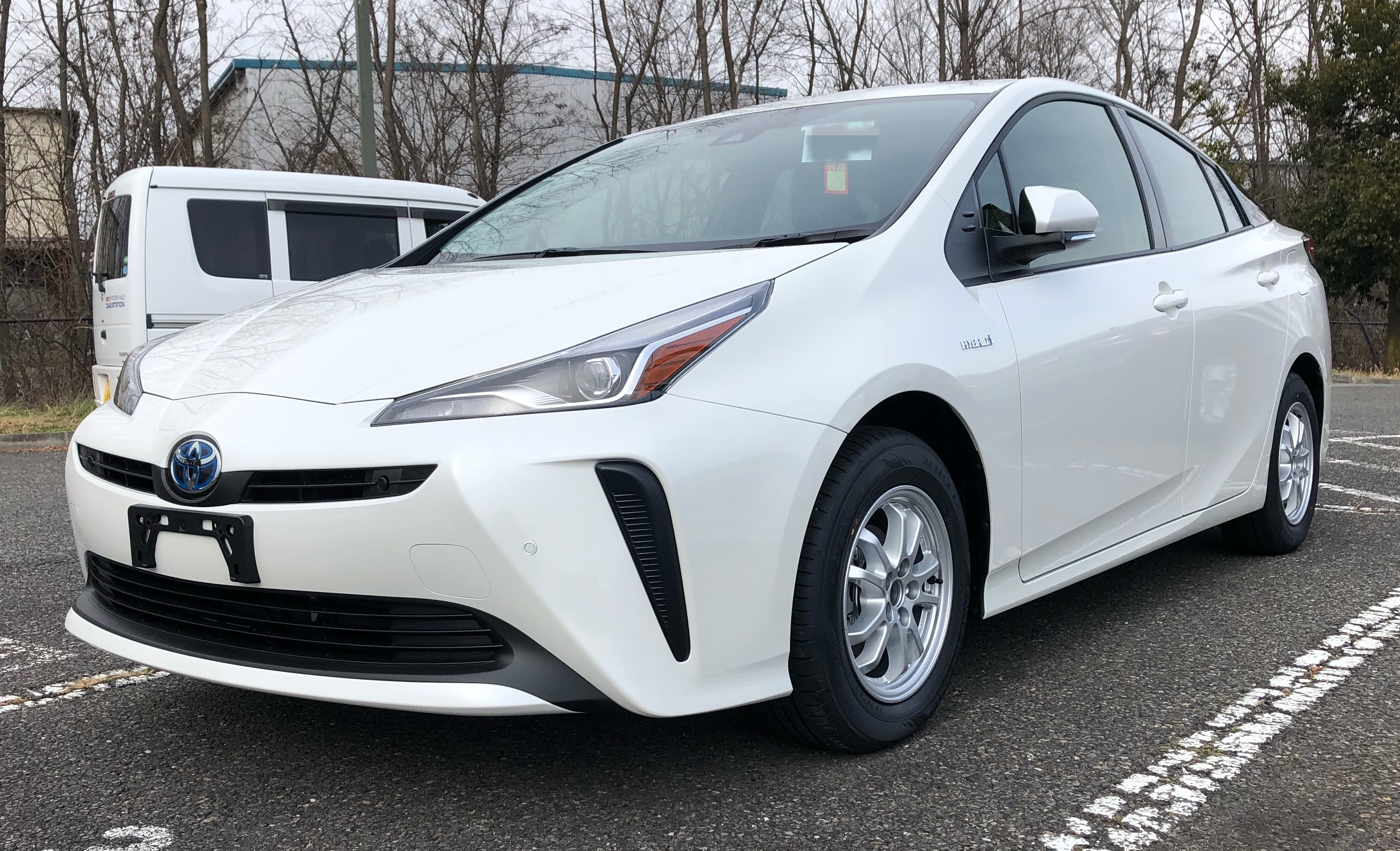
Toyota Prius, a series-parallel hybrid

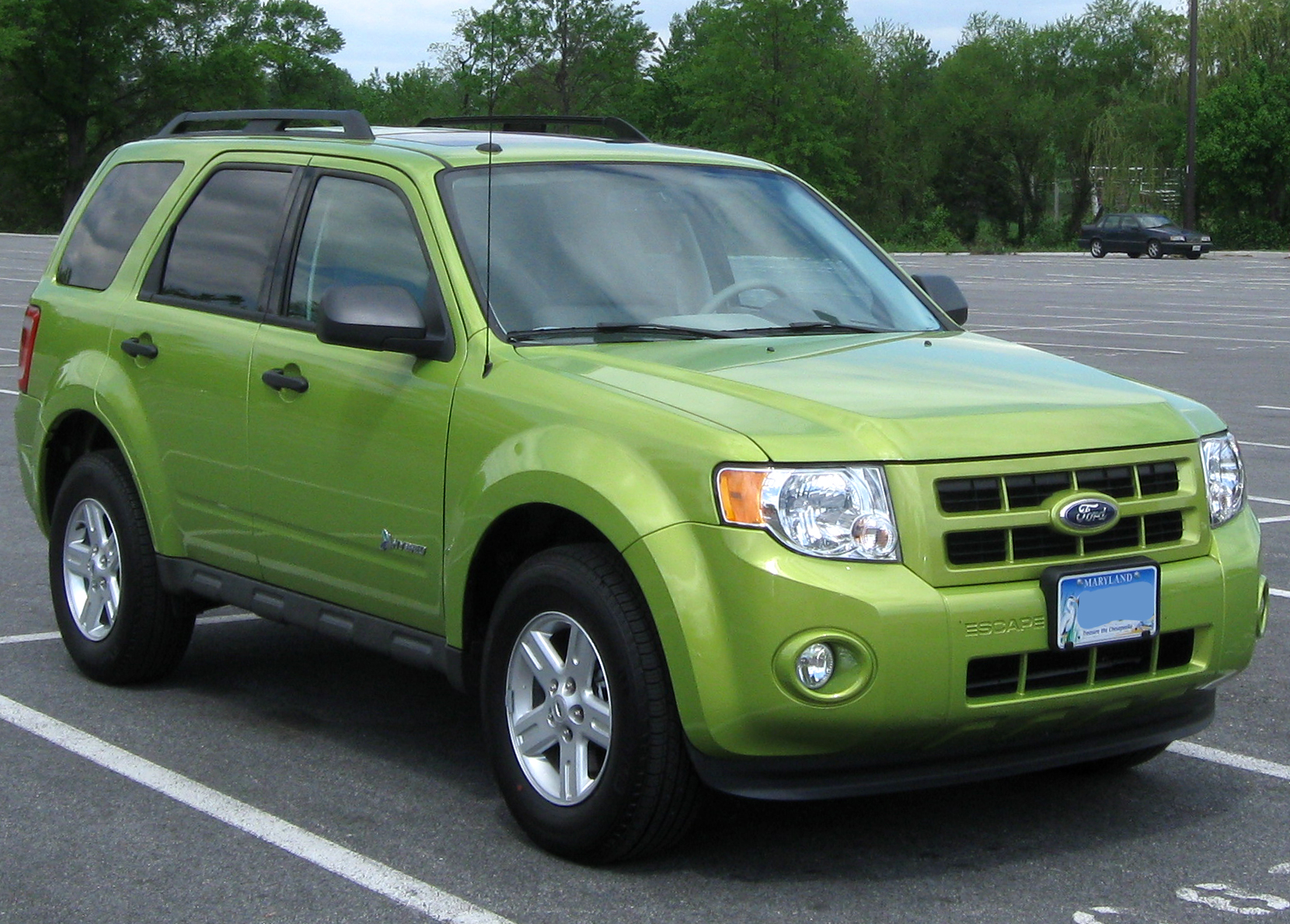
Ford Escape Hybrid, with a series-parallel drivetrain

In a parallel hybrid vehicle, an electric motor and an internal combustion engine are coupled such that they can power the vehicle either individually or together. Most commonly the internal combustion engine, the electric motor and gearbox are coupled by automatically controlled clutches. For electric driving, the clutch between the internal combustion engine is open while the clutch to the gearbox is engaged. While in combustion mode the engine and motor run at the same speed.

The first mass-production parallel hybrid sold outside Japan was the 1st generation Honda Insight.

The Mercedes-Benz E 300 BlueTEC HYBRID released in 2012 only in European markets is a very rare mass-produced diesel hybrid vehicle powered by a Mercedes-Benz OM651 engine developing 152 kW (204 hp) paired with a 20 kW (27 hp) electric motor, positioned between the engine and the gearbox, for a combined output of 170 kW (228 hp). The vehicle has a fuel consumption rate of 24–26 km/L (56–62 mpg_{‑US}; 67–74 mpg_{‑imp}).

=== Mild parallel hybrid ===
These types use a generally compact electric motor (usually <20 kW) to provide auto-stop/start features and to provide extra power assist during the acceleration, and to generate on the deceleration phase (also known as regenerative braking).

On-road examples include Honda Civic Hybrid, Honda Insight 2nd generation, Honda CR-Z, Honda Accord Hybrid, Mercedes Benz S400 BlueHYBRID, BMW 7 Series hybrids, General Motors BAS Hybrids, Suzuki S-Cross, Suzuki Wagon R and Smart fortwo with micro hybrid drive.

=== Power-split or series-parallel hybrid ===
In a power-split hybrid electric drive train, there are two motors: a traction electric motor and an internal combustion engine. The power from these two motors can be shared to drive the wheels via a power split device, which is a simple planetary gear set. The ratio can be from 100% for the combustion engine to 100% for the traction electric motor, or anything in between. The combustion engine can act as a generator charging the batteries.

Modern versions such as the Toyota Hybrid Synergy Drive have a second electric motor/generator connected to the planetary gear. In cooperation with the traction motor/generator and the power-split device, this provides a continuously variable transmission.

On the open road, the primary power source is the internal combustion engine. When maximum power is required, for example, to overtake, the traction electric motor is used to assist. This increases the available power for a short period, giving the effect of having a larger engine than actually installed. In most applications, the combustion engine is switched off when the car is slow or stationary thereby reducing curbside emissions.

Passenger car installations include Toyota Prius, Ford Escape and Fusion, as well as Lexus RX400h, RX450h, GS450h, LS600h, and CT200h.

=== Series hybrid ===
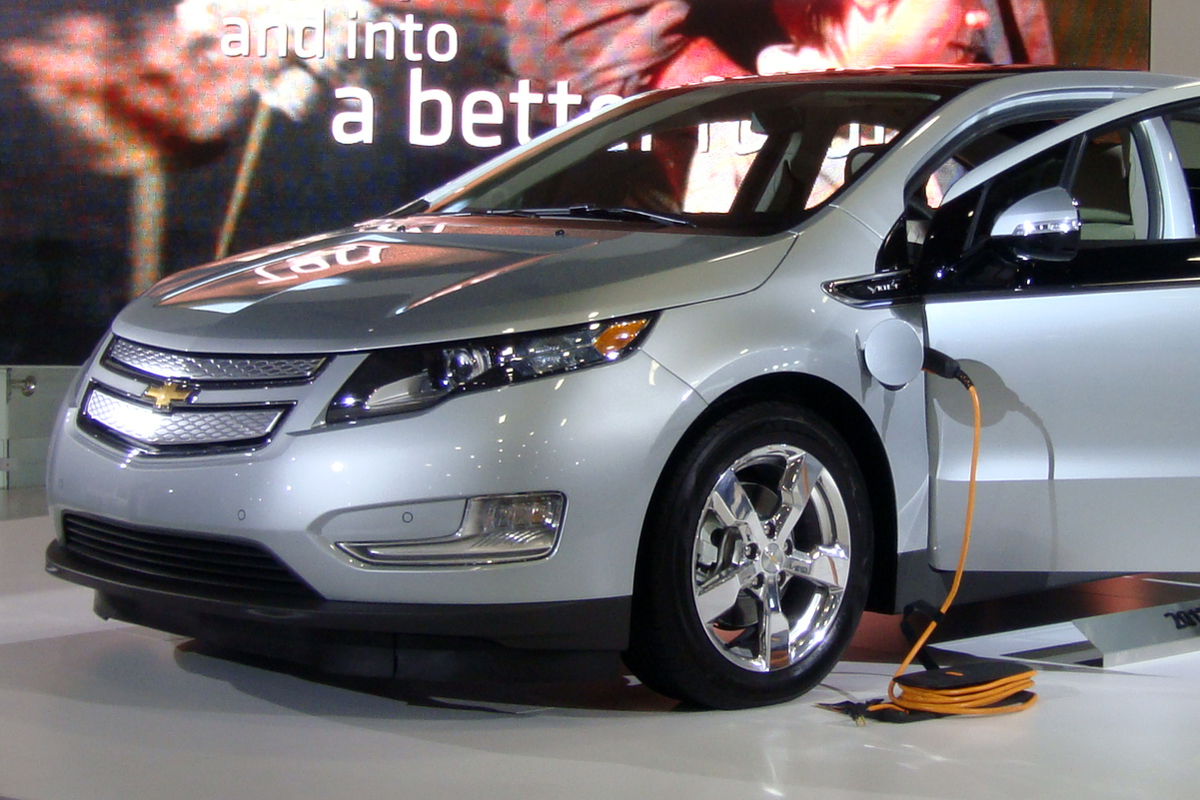
Chevrolet Volt, a plug-in series hybrid, also called an extended range electric vehicle (EREV)

A series- or serial-hybrid vehicle is driven by an electric motor, functioning as an electric vehicle while the battery pack energy supply is sufficient, with an engine tuned for running as a generator when the battery pack is insufficient. There is typically no mechanical connection between the engine and the wheels, and the primary purpose of the range extender is to charge the battery. Series-hybrids have also been referred to as extended range electric vehicle, range-extended electric vehicle, or electric vehicle-extended range (EREV/REEV/EVER).

The BMW i3 with range extender is a production series-hybrid. It operates as an electric vehicle until the battery charge is low, and then activates an engine-powered generator to maintain power, and is also available without the range extender. The Fisker Karma was the first series-hybrid production vehicle.

When describing cars, the battery of a series-hybrid is usually charged by being plugged in—but a series-hybrid may also allow for a battery to only act as a buffer (and for regeneration purposes), and for the electric motor's power to be supplied constantly by a supporting engine. Series arrangements have been common in diesel-electric locomotives and ships. Ferdinand Porsche effectively invented this arrangement in speed-record-setting racing cars in the early 20th century, such as the Lohner–Porsche Mixte Hybrid. Porsche named his arrangement "System Mixt" and it was a wheel hub motor design, where each of the two front wheels was powered by a separate motor. This arrangement was sometimes referred to as an electric transmission, as the electric generator and driving motor replaced a mechanical transmission. The vehicle could not move unless the internal combustion engine was running.

In 1997 Toyota released the first series-hybrid bus sold in Japan. GM introduced the Chevrolet Volt series plug-in hybrid in 2010, aiming for an all-electric range of 40 mi (64 km), though this car also has a mechanical connection between the engine and drivetrain. Supercapacitors combined with a lithium-ion battery bank have been used by AFS Trinity in a converted Saturn Vue SUV vehicle. Using supercapacitors they claim up to 150 mpg in a series-hybrid arrangement.

Nissan Note e-power is an example of a series hybrid technology since 2016 in Japan.

=== Plug-in hybrid electric vehicle ===
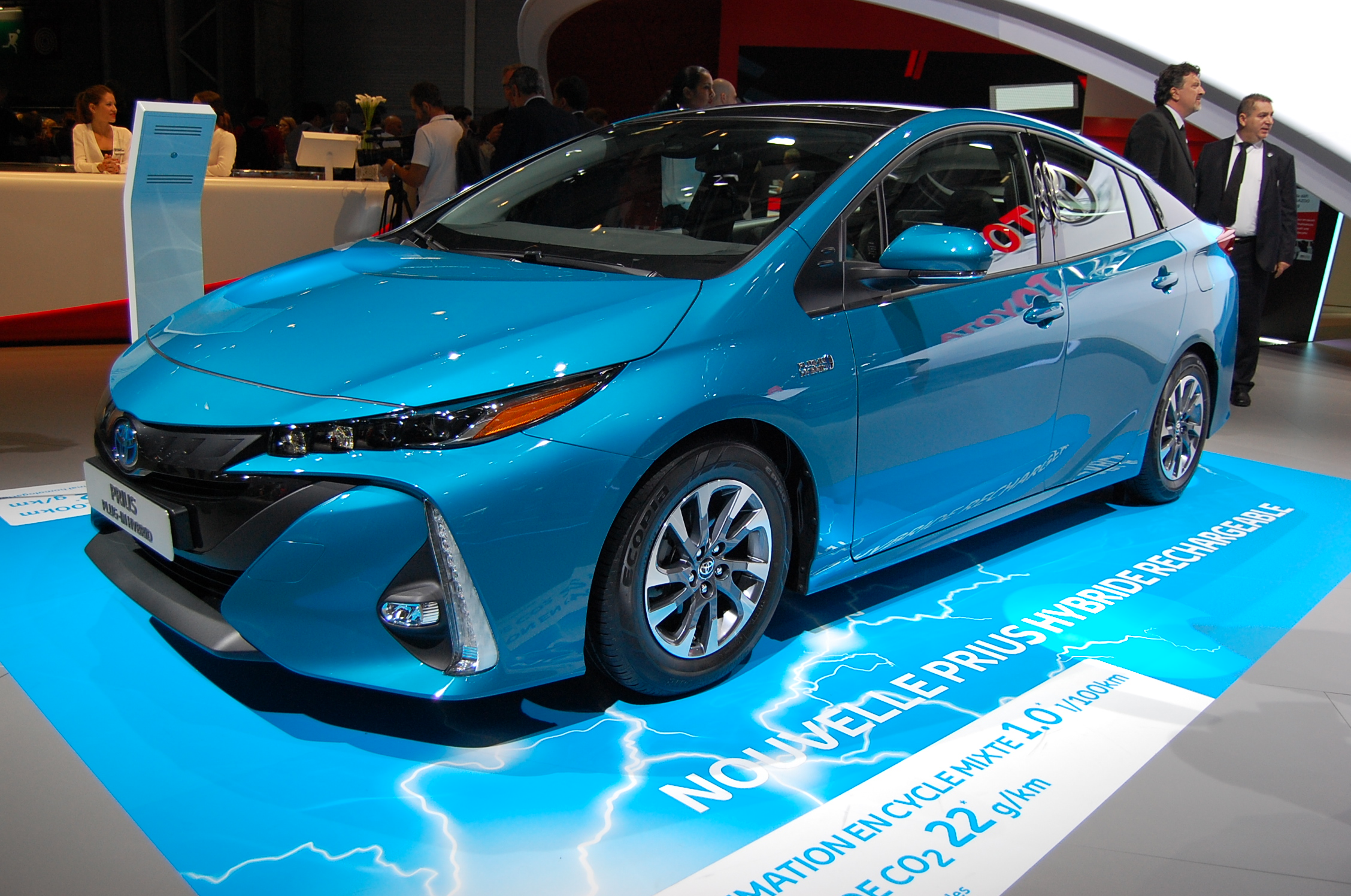
The Toyota Prius Prime has an all-electric range of 25 mi (40 km).

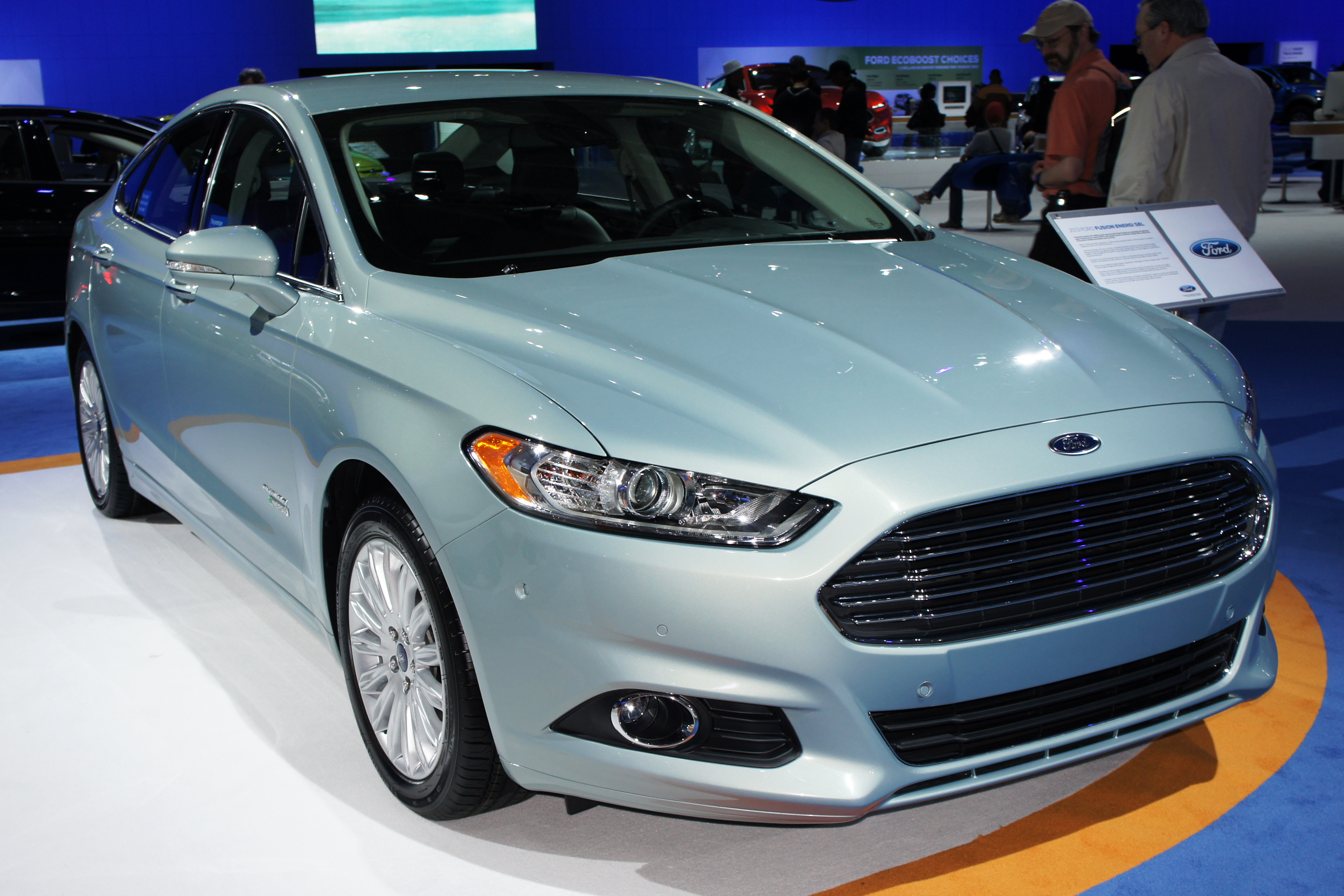
The Ford Fusion Energi is a plug-in hybrid with an all-electric range of 21 mi (34 km).

Another subtype of hybrid vehicles is the plug-in hybrid electric vehicle. The plug-in hybrid is usually a general fuel-electric (parallel or serial) hybrid with increased energy storage capacity, usually through a lithium-ion battery, which allows the vehicle to drive on all-electric mode a distance that depends on the battery size and its mechanical layout (series or parallel). It may be connected to mains electricity supply at the end of the journey to avoid charging using the on-board internal combustion engine.

This concept is attractive to those seeking to minimize on-road emissions by avoiding—or at least minimizing—the use of ICE during daily driving. As with pure electric vehicles, the total emissions saving, for example in CO_{2} terms, is dependent upon the energy source of the electricity generating company.

For some users, this type of vehicle may also be financially attractive so long as the electrical energy being used is cheaper than the petrol/diesel that they would have otherwise used. Current tax systems in many European countries use mineral oil taxation as a major income source. This is generally not the case for electricity, which is taxed uniformly for the domestic customer, however that person uses it. Some electricity suppliers also offer price benefits for off-peak night users, which may further increase the attractiveness of the plug-in option for commuters and urban motorists.

=== Road safety for cyclists, pedestrians ===
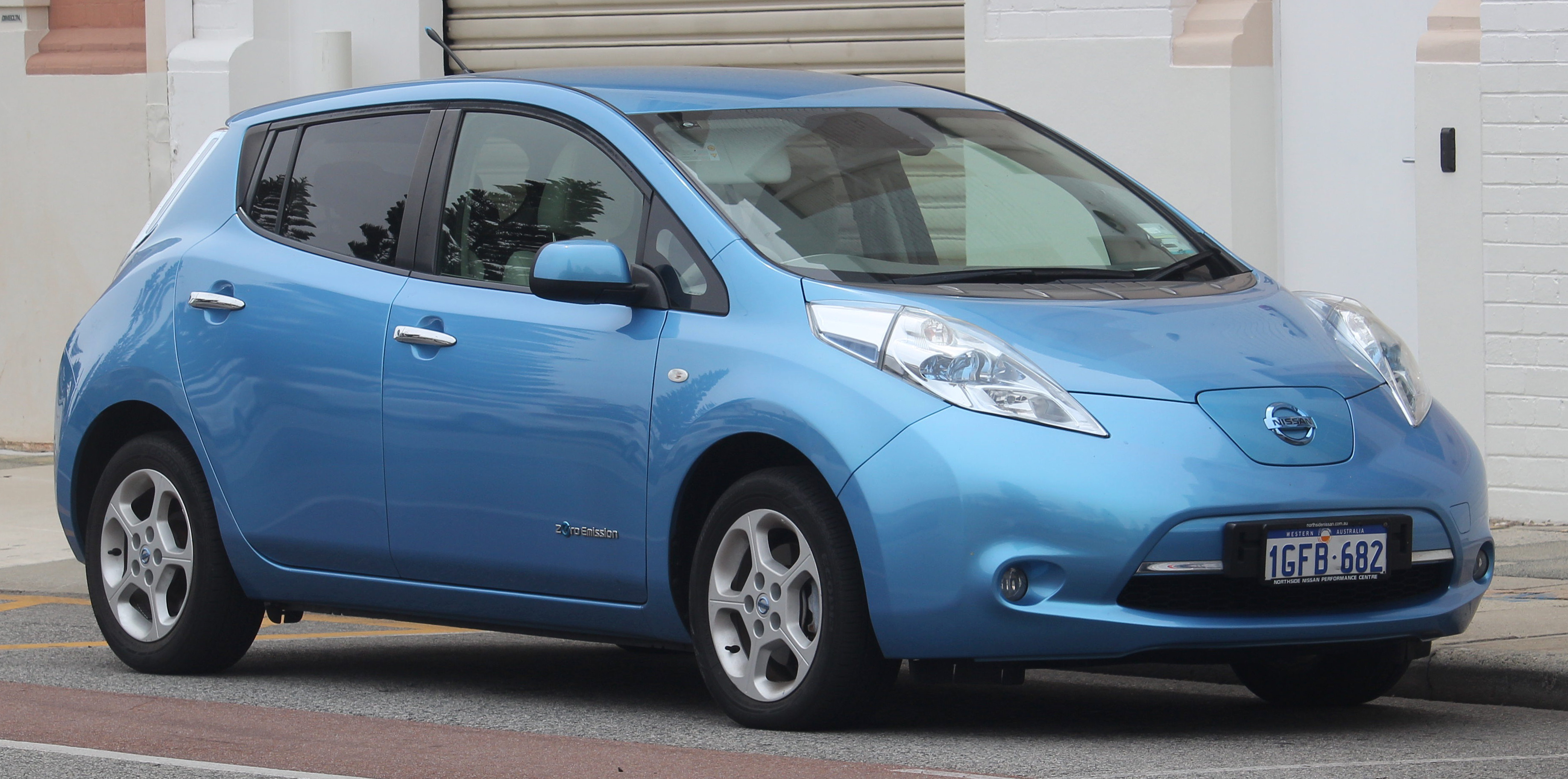
The Nissan Leaf was the first plug-in electric car equipped with Nissan's Vehicle Sound for Pedestrians.

A 2009 National Highway Traffic Safety Administration report examined hybrid electric vehicle accidents in the United States that involved pedestrians and cyclists and compared them to accidents involving internal combustion engine vehicles (ICEV). The findings showed that, in certain road situations, HEVs are more dangerous for those on foot or bicycle. For accidents where a vehicle was slowing or stopping, backing up, entering, or leaving a parking space (when the sound difference between HEVs and ICEVs is most pronounced), HEVs were twice as likely to be involved in a pedestrian crash than ICEVs. For crashes involving cyclists or pedestrians, there was a higher incident rate for HEVs than ICEVs when a vehicle was turning a corner. However, there was no statistically significant difference between the types of vehicles when they were driving straight.

Several automakers developed electric vehicle warning sounds designed to alert pedestrians to the presence of electric drive vehicles such as hybrid electric vehicle, plug-in hybrid electric vehicles and all-electric vehicles (EVs) travelling at low speeds. Their purpose is to make pedestrians, cyclists, the blind, and others aware of the vehicle's presence while operating in all-electric mode.

Vehicles in the market with such safety devices include the Nissan Leaf, Chevrolet Volt, Fisker Karma, Honda FCX Clarity, Nissan Fuga Hybrid/Infiniti M35, Hyundai ix35 FCEV, Hyundai Sonata Hybrid, 2012 Honda Fit EV, the 2012 Toyota Camry Hybrid, 2012 Lexus CT200h, and all the Prius family of cars.

== Environmental issues ==
=== Fuel consumption and emissions reductions ===
The hybrid vehicle typically achieves greater fuel economy and lower emissions than conventional internal combustion engine vehicles (ICEVs), resulting in fewer emissions being generated. These savings are primarily achieved by three elements of a typical hybrid design:

1. Relying on both the engine and the electric motors for peak power needs, resulting in a smaller engine size more for average usage rather than peak power usage. A smaller engine can have fewer internal losses and lower weight.
2. Having significant battery storage capacity to store and reuse recaptured energy, especially in stop-and-go traffic typical of the city driving cycle.
3. Recapturing significant amounts of energy during braking that are normally wasted as heat. This regenerative braking reduces vehicle speed by converting some of its kinetic energy into electricity, depending upon the power rating of the motor/generator;

Other techniques that are not necessarily 'hybrid' features, but that are frequently found on hybrid vehicles include:

1. Using Atkinson cycle engines instead of Otto cycle engines for improved fuel economy.
2. Shutting down the engine during traffic stops or while coasting or during other idle periods.
3. Improving aerodynamics; (part of the reason that SUVs get such bad fuel economy is the drag on the car. A box-shaped car or truck has to exert more force to move through the air causing more stress on the engine making it work harder). Improving the shape and aerodynamics of a car is a good way to help better the fuel economy and also improve vehicle handling at the same time.
4. Using low rolling resistance tires (tires were often made to give a quiet, smooth ride, high grip, etc., but efficiency was a lower priority). Tires cause mechanical drag, once again making the engine work harder, consuming more fuel. Hybrid cars may use special tires that are more inflated than regular tires and stiffer or by choice of carcass structure and rubber compound have lower rolling resistance while retaining acceptable grip, and so improving fuel economy whatever the power source.
5. Powering the a/c, power steering, and other auxiliary pumps electrically as and when needed; this reduces mechanical losses when compared with driving them continuously with traditional engine belts.

These features make a hybrid vehicle particularly efficient for city traffic where there are frequent stops, coasting, and idling periods. In addition noise emissions are reduced, particularly at idling and low operating speeds, in comparison to conventional engine vehicles. For continuous high-speed highway use, these features are much less useful in reducing emissions.

=== Hybrid vehicle emissions ===
Hybrid vehicle emissions today are getting close to or even lower than the recommended level set by the EPA (Environmental Protection Agency). The recommended levels they suggest for a typical passenger vehicle should be equated to 5.5 metric tons of CO_{2}. The three most popular hybrid vehicles, Honda Civic, Honda Insight and Toyota Prius, set the standards even higher by producing 4.1, 3.5, and 3.5 tons showing a major improvement in carbon dioxide emissions. Hybrid vehicles can reduce air emissions of smog-forming pollutants by up to 90% and cut carbon dioxide emissions in half.

An increase in fossil fuels is needed to build hybrid vehicles versus conventional cars. This increase is more than offset by reduced emissions when running the vehicle.

Hybrid CO_{2} emissions have been understated when comparing certification cycles to real-world driving. In one study using real-world driving data, it was shown they use on average 120 g of CO_{2} per km instead of the 44 g per km in official tests.

Toyota states that three Hybrid vehicles equal one battery electric vehicle in CO_{2} reduction effect from carbon neutrality viewpoint which means reducing CO_{2} emissions to zero throughout the entire life cycle of a product, starting from procurement of raw materials, manufacturing, and transportation to use, recycling, and disposal.

=== Environmental impact of hybrid car batteries ===
Though hybrid cars consume less fuel than conventional cars, there is still an issue regarding the environmental damage of the hybrid car battery. Today, most hybrid car batteries are lithium-ion, which has higher energy density than nickel–metal hydride batteries and is more environmentally friendly than lead-based batteries which constitute the bulk of petrol car starter batteries today.

There are many types of batteries. Some are far more toxic than others. Lithium-ion is the least toxic of the batteries mentioned above.

The toxicity levels and environmental impact of nickel metal hydride batteries—the type previously used in hybrids—are much lower than batteries like lead acid or nickel cadmium according to one source. Another source claims nickel metal hydride batteries are much more toxic than lead batteries, also that recycling them and disposing of them safely is difficult. In general various soluble and insoluble nickel compounds, such as nickel chloride and nickel oxide, have known carcinogenic effects in chick embryos and rats. The main nickel compound in NiMH batteries is nickel oxyhydroxide (NiOOH), which is used as the positive electrode. However nickel metal hydride batteries have fallen out of favour in hybrid vehicles as various lithium-ion chemistries have become more mature to market.

The lithium-ion battery has become a market leader in this segment due to its high energy density, stability, and cost when compared to other technologies. A market leader in this area is Panasonic with their partnership with Tesla.

The lithium-ion batteries are appealing because they have the highest energy density of any rechargeable batteries and can produce a voltage more than three times that of nickel–metal hydride battery cell while simultaneously storing large quantities of electricity as well. The batteries also produce higher output (boosting vehicle power), higher efficiency (avoiding wasteful use of electricity), and provides excellent durability, compared with the life of the battery being roughly equivalent to the life of the vehicle. Additionally, the use of lithium-ion batteries reduces the overall weight of the vehicle and also achieves improved fuel economy of 30% better than petro-powered vehicles with a consequent reduction in CO_{2} emissions helping to prevent global warming.

Lithium-ion batteries are also safer to recycle, with Volkswagen Group pioneering processes to recycle lithium-ion batteries; this is also being chased by various other large companies, such as BMW, Audi, Mercedes-Benz and Tesla. The main goal within many of these companies is to combat disinformation about the nature of lithium batteries, primarily that they are not recyclable, which primarily stem from articles discussing the difficulties of recycling.

=== Charging ===
There are two different levels of charging in plug-in hybrids. Level one charging is the slower method as it uses a 120 V/15 A single-phase grounded outlet. Level two is a faster method; existing Level 2 equipment offers charging from 208 V or 240 V (at up to 80 A, 19.2 kW). It may require dedicated equipment and a connection installation for home or public units. The optimum charging window for lithium-ion batteries is 3–4.2 V. Recharging with a 120-volt household outlet takes several hours, a 240-volt charger takes 1–4 hours, and a quick charge takes approximately 30 minutes to achieve 80% charge. Three important factors—distance on charge, cost of charging, and time to charge In order for hybrids to run on electrical power, the car must perform the action of braking in order to generate some electricity. The electricity then gets discharged most effectively when the car accelerates or climbs up an incline. In 2014, hybrid electric car batteries can run on solely electricity for 70–130 miles (110–210 km) on a single charge. Hybrid battery capacity currently ranges from 4.4 kWh to 85 kWh on a fully electric car. On a hybrid car, the battery packs currently range from 0.6 kWh to 2.4 kWh representing a large difference in use of electricity in hybrid cars.

=== Raw materials increasing costs ===
There is an impending increase in the costs of many rare materials used in the manufacture of hybrid cars. For example, the rare-earth element dysprosium is required to fabricate many of the advanced electric motors and battery systems in hybrid propulsion systems. Neodymium is another rare earth metal which is a crucial ingredient in high-strength magnets that are found in permanent magnet electric motors.

Nearly all the rare-earth elements in the world come from China, and many analysts believe that an overall increase in Chinese electronics manufacturing will consume this entire supply by 2012. In addition, export quotas on Chinese rare-earth elements have resulted in an unknown amount of supply.

A few non-Chinese sources such as the advanced Hoidas Lake project in northern Canada as well as Mount Weld in Australia are currently under development; however, the barriers to entry are high and require years to go online.

== How hybrid-electric vehicles work ==
Hybrid-electric vehicles (HEVs) combine the advantage of gasoline engines and electric motors. The key areas for efficiency or performance gains are regenerative braking, dual power sources, and less idling.

- Regenerative braking. The electric motor normally converts electricity into physical motion. Used in reverse as a generator, it can also convert physical motion into electricity. This both slows the car (braking) and recharges (regenerates) the batteries.
- Dual power. Power can come from either the engine, motor, or both depending on driving circumstances. Additional power to assist the engine in accelerating or climbing might be provided by the electric motor. Or more commonly, a smaller electric motor provides all of the power for low-speed driving conditions and is augmented by the engine at higher speeds.
- Automatic start/shutoff. It automatically shuts off the engine when the vehicle comes to a stop and restarts it when the accelerator is pressed down. This automation is much simpler with an electric motor. Also, see dual power above.

== Alternative green vehicles ==
Other types of green vehicles include other vehicles that go fully or partly on alternative energy sources than fossil fuel. Another option is to use alternative fuel composition (i.e. biofuels) in conventional fossil fuel-based vehicles, making them go partly on renewable energy sources.

Other approaches include personal rapid transit, a public transportation concept that offers automated on-demand non-stop transportation, on a network of specially built guideways.

== Marketing ==
=== Adoption ===
Automakers spend around $US8 million in marketing Hybrid vehicles each year. With combined effort from many car companies, the Hybrid industry has sold millions of Hybrids.

Hybrid car companies like Toyota, Honda, Ford, and BMW have pulled together to create a movement of Hybrid vehicle sales pushed by Washington lobbyists to lower the world's emissions and become less reliant on our petroleum consumption.

In 2005, sales went beyond 200,000 Hybrids, but in retrospect that only reduced the global use for gasoline consumption by 200,000 gallons per day—a tiny fraction of the 360 million gallons used per day. According to Bradley Berman author of Driving Change—One Hybrid at a time, "cold economics shows that in real dollars, except for a brief spike in the 1970s, gas prices have remained remarkably steady and cheap. Fuel continues to represent a small part of the overall cost of owning and operating a personal vehicle". Other marketing tactics include greenwashing which is the "unjustified appropriation of environmental virtue." Temma Ehrenfeld explained in an article by Newsweek. Hybrids may be more efficient than many other gasoline motors as far as gasoline consumption is concerned but as far as being green and good for the environment is completely inaccurate.

Hybrid car companies have a long time to go if they expect to really go green. According to Harvard business professor Theodore Levitt states "managing products" and "meeting customers' needs", "you must adapt to consumer expectations and anticipation of future desires." This means people buy what they want, if they want a fuel efficient car they buy a Hybrid without thinking about the actual efficiency of the product. This "green myopia" as Ottman calls it, fails because marketers focus on the greenness of the product and not on the actual effectiveness.

Researchers and analysts say people are drawn to the new technology, as well as the convenience of fewer fill-ups. Secondly, people find it rewarding to own the better, newer, flashier, and so-called greener car.

=== Misleading advertising ===
In 2019 the term self-charging hybrid became prevalent in advertising, though cars referred to by this name do not offer any different functionality than a standard hybrid electric vehicle provides. The only self-charging effect is in energy recovery via regenerative braking, which is also true of plug-in hybrids, fuel cell electric vehicles, and battery electric vehicles.

In January 2020, using this term has been prohibited in Norway, for misleading advertising by Toyota and Lexus. "Our claim is based on the fact that customers never have to charge the battery of their vehicle, as it is recharged during the vehicle use. There is no intention to mislead customers, on the contrary: the point is to clearly explain the difference with plug-in hybrid vehicles."

== Adoption rate ==
While the adoption rate for hybrids in the US is small today (2.2% of new car sales in 2011), this compares with a 17.1% share of new car sales in Japan in 2011, and it has the potential to be very large over time as more models are offered and incremental costs decline due to learning and scale benefits. However, forecasts vary widely. For instance, Bob Lutz, a long-time skeptic of hybrids, indicated he expects hybrids "will never comprise more than 10% of the US auto market." Other sources also expect hybrid penetration rates in the US will remain under 10% for many years.

More optimistic views as of 2006 include predictions that hybrids would dominate new car sales in the US and elsewhere over the next 10 to 20 years. Another approach, taken by Saurin Shah, examines the penetration rates (or S-curves) of four analogs (historical and current) to hybrid and electrical vehicles in an attempt to gauge how quickly the vehicle stock could be hybridized and/or electrified in the United States. The analogs are (1) the electric motors in US factories in the early 20th century, (2) diesel-electric locomotives on US railways in the 1920–1945 period, (3) a range of new automotive features/technologies introduced in the US over the past fifty years, and 4) e-bike purchases in China over the past few years. These analogs collectively suggest it would take at least 30 years for hybrid and electric vehicles to capture 80% of the US passenger vehicle stock.

The EPA expects the combined market share of new gasoline hybrid light-duty vehicles to reach 13.6% for the 2023 model year from 10.2% in the 2022 model year.

== European Union 2020 regulation standards ==
The European Parliament, Council, and European Commission have reached an agreement which is aimed at reducing the average CO_{2} passenger car emissions to 95 g/km by 2020, according to a European Commission press release.

According to the release, the key details of the agreement are as follows:

- Emissions target: The agreement will reduce average CO_{2} emissions from new cars to 95 g/km from 2020, as proposed by the commission. This is a 40% reduction from the mandatory 2015 target of 130 g/km. The target is an average for each manufacturer's new car fleet; it allows OEMs to build some vehicles that emit less than the average and some that emit more.
- 2025 target: The commission is required to propose a further emissions reduction target by the end-2015 to take effect in 2025. This target will be in line with the EU's long-term climate goals.
- Super credits for low-emission vehicles: The Regulation will give manufacturers additional incentives to produce cars with CO_{2} emissions of 50 g/km or less (which will be electric or plug-in hybrid cars). Each of these vehicles will be counted as two vehicles in 2020, 1.67 in 2021, 1.33 in 2022, and then as one vehicle from 2023 onwards. These super credits will help manufacturers further reduce the average emissions of their new car fleet. However, to prevent the scheme from undermining the environmental integrity of the legislation, there will be a 2.5 g/km cap per manufacturer on the contribution that super credits can make to their target in any year.

== See also ==
- Alternative propulsion
- Bivalent (engine)
- Efficient energy use
- Electric vehicle
- Global Hybrid Cooperation
- Global warming
- Human–electric hybrid vehicle
- Hybrid vehicle drivetrain
- List of hybrid vehicles
- Multi-fuel stove
- PNGV
- Solid oxide fuel cell
- Triple-hybrid
