= Tribrid engine =

A Tribrid engine, or triple-hybrid engine, is an engine that uses three different power sources.

== Automobiles ==
Some Skoda buses use a powertrain comprising a hydrogen fuel cell, battery, and ultracapacitor developed by the German company Proton Motor Fuel Cell. Like other fuel cell powered vehicles, the proton exchange membrane fuel cell in this drive system uses hydrogen to produce electric power to motor. When the vehicle is stationary, the proton exchange membrane fuel cell recharges both the lead-gel batteries and the ultracapacitors. Regenerative braking energy is also captured in the batteries and the capacitors. During peak energy requirements the batteries and capacitors provide additional electric power to the motor in parallel with the fuel cell.

Another tribrid powertrain, used in the Dacia Duster and Bigster, combines a petrol engine, an LPG system and an electric battery, with the power source or combination of sources selected according to driving conditions and the driver's input. A different proposed tribrid engine design comprises an ICE, an electric motor, and a hydrogen fuel cell.

== Rockets ==
In rocketry, tribrid engines, also called tripropellant engines, are essentially hybrid rocket motors with supplementary fuel injection. One design uses ABS, NOx, and alcohol.

== See Also ==
- Hybrid vehicle
- Ford F-250 Super Chief
