= Ridemakerz =

American toy car retailer

RIDEMAKERZ
- Industry: Retail
- Founded: June 1, 2007; 19 years ago Myrtle Beach, South Carolina, United States
- Founders: Larry Andreini; Chip Foose; Maxine Clark
- Headquarters: Irvine, California, United states
- Key people: Larry Andreini; Chip Foose; Maxine Clark
- Products: Toy cars
- Website: ridemakerz.com

Ridemakerz (alternatively written "RIDEMAKERZ") is an American retailer of customizable toy cars. The business was started in 2007 by Larry Andreini, Chip Foose (of TLC Overhaulin'), and Maxine Clark (of Build-A-Bear Workshop).

== History ==
The first location opened June 1, 2007 in Myrtle Beach, SC at Broadway at the Beach. Since then, twelve locations had opened in ten other states. In late 2009, Ridemakerz began closing most of its stores. By early 2022, Ridemakerz has opened a total of 5 stores, Myrtle Beach SC, Branson MO, Pigeon Forge TN, Mall of America MN, and Anaheim CA. The company holds licenses to make the Chevrolet Corvette, Dodge Challenger, Dodge Ram, Dodge Viper, Ford F-250 Super Chief, Ford Mustang, and the Scion xB.

== Company information ==
Ridemakerz is a limited liability company. It was founded in 2007 in St. Louis, Missouri and moved to Rancho Santa Margarita, California in 2009. There are currently 8 locations. The main financier is investor Norman Pozez. Build-A-Bear owns about 25% of the company. In 2010, it opened a warehouse and distribution center in Valencia, California (using the same system as Build-A-Bear) and moving its headquarters to Irvine, California. There are approximately 250 employees nationwide and 16 employees at its headquarters. In 2018, 2 new stores were opened.

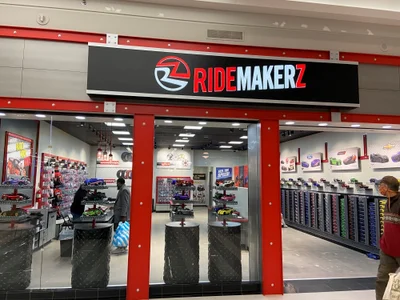
ridemakerz location in Mall of America, MN The guys customize their own car

== Special edition ==
The company holds licenses to make the character of Disney/Pixar's Cars and Cars 2 included Lightning McQueen, Mater, Sally, Francesco Bernoulli, Finn McMissile, etc.
