= Ford F-250 Super Chief =

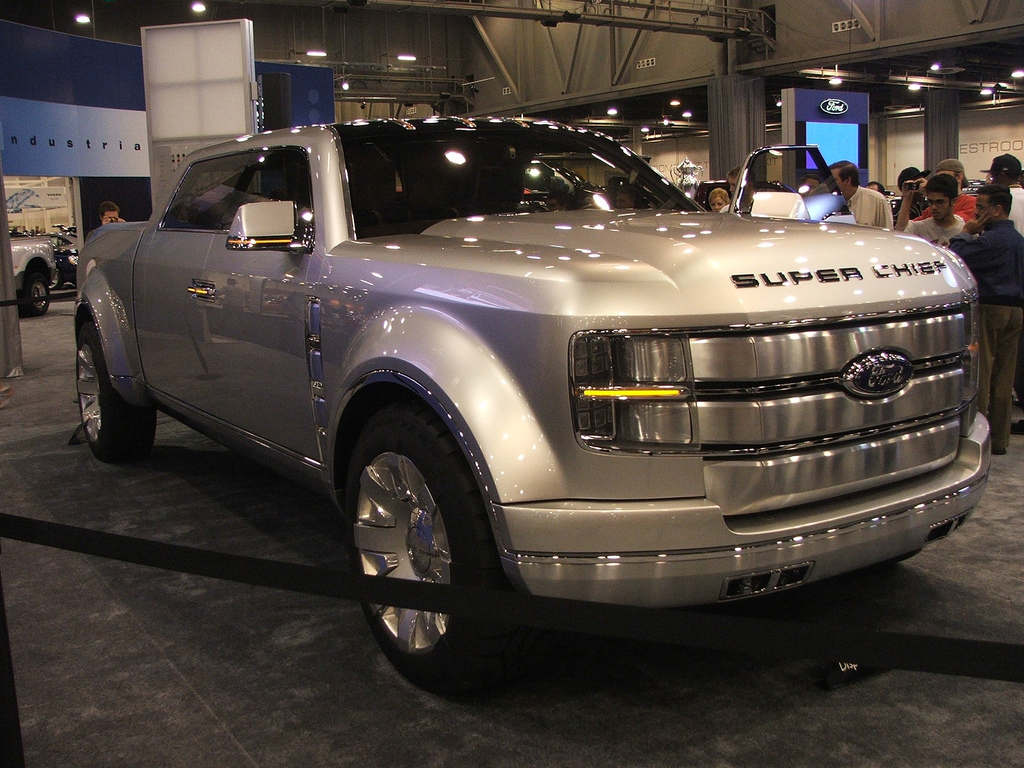

Overview
- Manufacturer: Ford
- Model years: 2006

Body and chassis
- Class: Concept heavy-duty pickup truck
- Layout: Front engine, rear-wheel drive / four wheel drive
- Doors: Conventional doors (front); Coach doors (rear)

Powertrain
- Engine: 6.8L Tri-Flex Supercharged V10

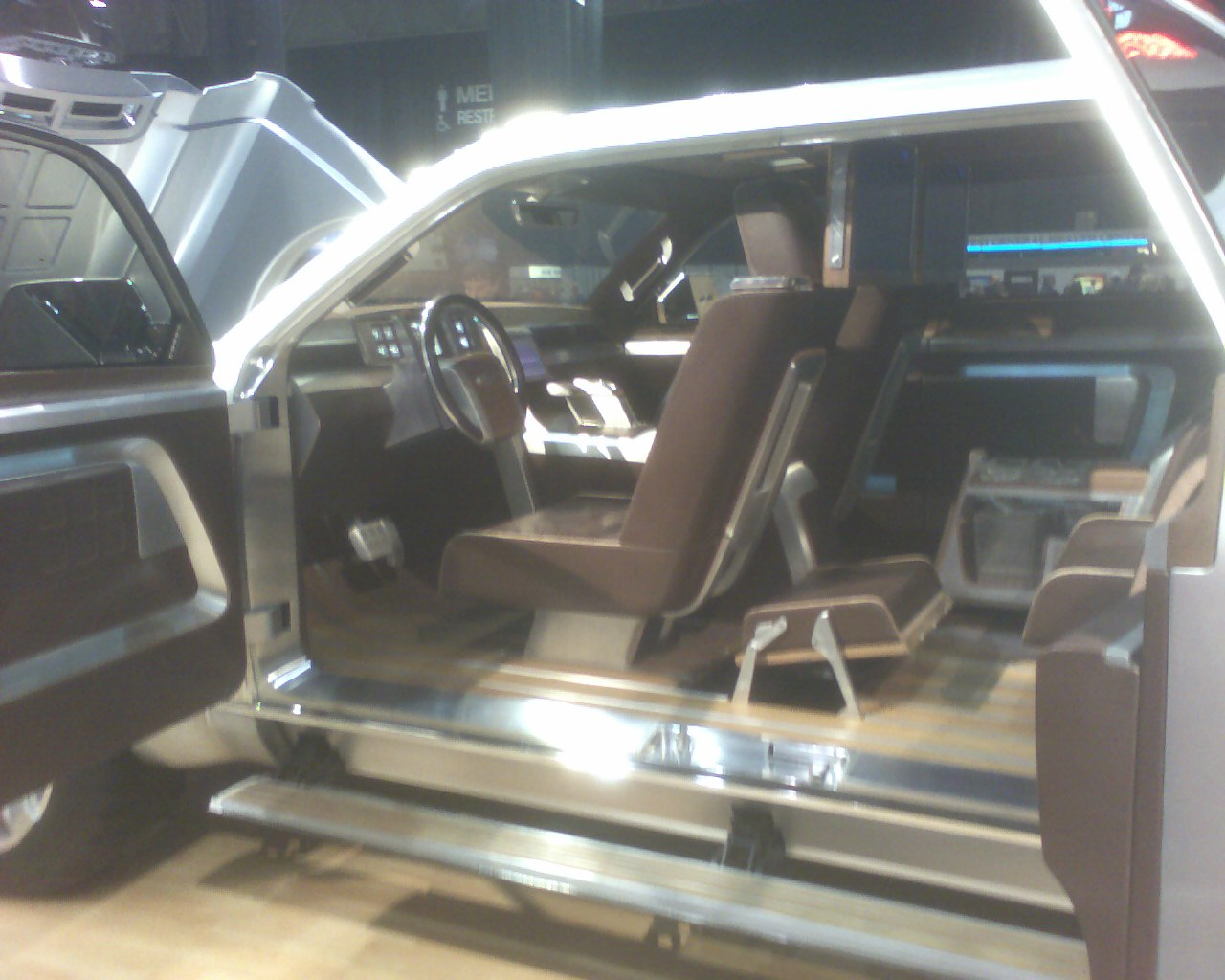
Super Chief interior

The Ford F-250 Super Chief is a concept heavy-duty truck built by Ford. It features a tri-flex fueling system that allows users to use three different fuels including gasoline, E85 ethanol or hydrogen. This was intended to make the Super Chief more attractive to customers who were concerned about finding fuel as the ethanol and hydrogen infrastructures were developing. In a tri-flex fueling system owners could utilize any given option at any one time. It came with a stock bed cover and liner; it was a crew cab. In addition, it features rear suicide doors.

== Technology ==
The tri-flex fueling system on the Ford F-250 Super Chief allows operators to go 500 miles between total refueling with the supercharger activated only when using the hydrogen fueling system. The hydrogen system also provides 400 lb.-ft. of torque. The transfer between fueling options is performed through a switching system onboard and can be accomplished while the vehicle is running. The hydrogen-based fuel alternative boasts 12-percent greater fuel efficiency when compared to either of the remaining fueling options. Using hydrogen also provides 99-percent less CO_{2} emissions than the gasoline-only option.

While the tri-flex system was a new concept at Ford, the automaker has been committed to providing customers with a flex-fueling system in their Ford F-150 models for 2005 and 2006 that allowed either unleaded or E85 to be used in the same tank. As of 2026, the concept is in the collection of Ford’s Heritage Fleet.

== Design ==
The Super Chief had a very similar style and appearance to the 2002 Mighty F-350 concept. Hence its nameplate, the front end and grille was inspired by the locomotives of the same name. The grille bars also foreshadowed the very future 2018 Super Duty Limited trim, along with the headlights foreshadowing the 2021-2023 Ford F-150.

== Powertrain ==
Not very much is known about the powertrain, other than the engine being a supercharged tri-flex 6.8 L V10 producing 550 horsepower.

== Appearances in media and merchandise ==
Although it never went into production, the Super Chief appeared in the off-road driving video game Off Road. It was the most powerful and most expensive vehicle in the game.

It also appeared as a body, on the opening of formerly Myrtle Beach, South Carolina-based Ridemakerz' toy car building shop. The body is still available, as it is still produced under license to Ridemakerz.

According to IGCD (the Internet Game Cars Database), it (now) appears in the 2017 mobile game Top Drives.

Based on IMCDB, it also made its first (and only) TV/film appearance in the 2000 non-fiction series Auto Esporte (season 8 episode 2; the series still runs to this day).
