= Hacienda Lipangue Airport =

- IATA: none; ICAO: SCHL

Summary
- Airport type: Public
- Serves: Lampa, Chile
- Elevation AMSL: 1,745 ft / 532 m
- Coordinates: 33°20′10″S 70°54′58″W

Map
- Location of Hacienda Lipangue Airport in Chile

Runways
Direction	Length		Surface
Direction	m	ft	Surface
05/23	785	2,575	Dirt
- Source: GCM Landings.com Google Maps

Hacienda Lipangue Airport Spanish: Aeropuerto de Hacienda Lipangue, (ICAO: SCHL) is an airstrip 6 kilometres (3.7 mi) southwest of Lampa, a city in the Santiago Metropolitan Region of Chile.

There is mountainous terrain in all quadrants except east.

The Pudahuel VOR-DME (Ident: PDH) is located 7.3 nautical miles (13.5 km) southeast of the airstrip.

== See also ==
- Transport in Chile
- List of airports in Chile
