= Hawaii Library Association =

Professional association for librarians in Hawai'i

Hawaiʻi Library Association
- Nickname: HLA
- Formation: January 16, 1922; 104 years ago
- Tax ID no.: 99-6010067
- Parent organization: American Library Association

The Hawaiʻi Library Association (HLA) is a professional organization for Hawaii's librarians and library workers created "to promote library service and librarianship in Hawai'i." It is headquartered in Honolulu, Hawai'i. The Hawai'i Library Association was organized at a meeting of 20 county librarians on January 16–17, 1922. Clara Hemenway, director of the University of Hawaiʻi Library was the first president. The association's first informal meeting was in 1922; Margaret Newman was the first elected president at their first official meeting in 1924. HLA became a chapter of the American Library Association at that same meeting, in March 1924.

HLA publishes the HLA Newsletter (first published in 1943 as the News Bulletin), the Hawai‘i Library Association Journal (starting in 1944), and Current Hawaiiana. HLA's Children and Youth Section sponsors the annual Nēnē Award, a children's book award selected by Hawaii's elementary and middle school children.

== HLA sections ==
HLA has seven sections as of January, 2020.

- Administration Section
- Hawaiian Section
- Information Technology Section
- Reference and User Services Section
- School and Media Center Services Section
- Technical Services Section
- Children and Youth Services Section

== See also ==
- List of libraries in the United States
