= Troy (given name) =

- Pronunciation: /trɔɪ/
- Gender: Male

Origin
- Origin: Irish or Ancient Greek
- Meaning: "Foot soldier"

Other names
- Variant form: Troye

Troy is a male given first name used in English-speaking countries, and may derive from the Irish Troightheach, meaning "foot soldier". Additionally Troy is utilised as an anglicised surname derived from a variety of Gaelic and Norman surnames. Further detail here Troy (surname).

Alternately, especially as a modern given name for boys, the name may be of Classical Greek inspiration—derived from the ancient city of Troy (Ancient Greek: Τροία, romanized: Troía), site of the legendary Trojan War described in the Epic Cycle of Ancient Greece, most famously in Homer's epic poems the Iliad and the Odyssey.

== People ==
=== Male ===
- Troy, stage name for American professional wrestler Erik Watts

==== A ====
- Troy Afenir (born 1963), American baseball player
- Troy Agnew (born 1890), American baseball player
- Troy Aikman (born 1966), American football quarterback
- Troy Alexander (born 1971), Canadian football player
- Troy Alves (born 1966), American bodybuilder
- Troy Andersen (born 1999), American football player
- Troy Andes (born 1981), American Politician
- Troy Andrew (born 1977), American football player
- Troy Andrews (born 1961), American basketball player
- Troy Andrews (born 1986), American musician, known as Trombone Shorty
- Troy Apke (born 1995), American football player
- Troy Archer (born 1955), American football player
- Troy Archibald-Henville (born 1988), English football player
- Troy Auzenne (born 1969), American football player
- Troy Ave (born 1985), American musician

==== B ====
- Troy Baker, American voice actor
- Troy Balderson, (born 1962) American politician
- Troy Barnett (born 1971), American football player
- Troy Barnhart Jr. (born 1971), American water polo player
- Troy Batchelor (born 1987), Australian speedway rider
- Troy Baxter Jr. (born 1996), American basketball player
- Troy Bayliss (born 1969), Australian motorcycle racer
- Troy Beatty (born 1866), American Episcopal bishop
- Troy Beckwith, Australian television actor
- Troy Beebe (born 1962), American NASCAR driver
- Troy Bell (born 1980), American basketball player
- Troy Bell (born 1973), American politician
- Troy Benson (born 1963), American football player
- Troy Benson (born 1970), American skier
- Troy Bergeron (born 1983), American football player
- Troy Bienemann (born 1983), American football player
- Troy E. Black (born 1969), American Marine
- Troy Blacklaws (born 1965), South African writer
- Troy Blakely (born 1949), American talent agent
- Troy Bodie (born 1985), Canadian hockey player
- Troy Bodine (born 1963), Canadian football player
- Troy Bond (born 1973), Australian football player
- Troy Bourke (born 1994), Canadian hockey player
- Troy Bowles (born 2005), American football player
- Troy Boyle (born 1966), American comic book artist
- Troy Bradford (born 1966), American basketball player
- Troy Brauntuch (born 1954), American artist
- Troy Brenna (born 1970), American stunt actor
- Troy Brewer (born 1989), American basketball player
- Troy Broadbridge (born 1980), Australian football player
- Troy Brohawn (born 1973), American baseball player
- Troy Brooks (born 1972), Canadian painter
- Troy Brosnan (born 1993), Australian racing cyclist
- Troy Brouwer (born 1985), Canadian ice hockey player
- Troy Brown (basketball) (born 1971), American basketball player
- Troy Brown (footballer) (born 1990), Welsh footballer
- Troy Brown Jr. (born 1999), American basketball player
- Troy E. Brown (born 1971), American politician from Louisiana
- Troy Brownfield, American comic book writer
- Troy Buckley (born 1968), American baseball player
- Troy Buswell (born 1966), Australian politician
- Troy Butler (born 1967), Australian speedway rider

==== C ====
- Troy Caesar ( born 1994), British Virgin Islands football player
- Troy Calhoun (born 1966), American football coach
- Troy Campbell (born 1972), Australian rugby player
- Troy Carter (physicist) (born 1973), American plasma physicist
- Troy Carter (politician) (born 1963), American politician
- Troy Carter (talent manager) (born 1972), American talent manager
- Troy Cartwright, American musician
- Troy Cassar-Daley (born 1969), American musician
- Troy Cassell (born 1970), Australian rugby player
- Troy Castaneda (born 1989), American racing driver
- Troy Cate (born 1980), American baseball player
- Troy Caupain (born 1995), American basketball player
- Troy Chaplin (born 1986), Australian football player
- Troy Christensen (born 1964), American writer
- Troy Clarke (Australian rules footballer) (born 1969), Australian football player
- Troy Clarke (rugby league), Australian rugby player
- Troy Claycomb, American politician
- Troy CLE, American writer
- Troy Cline (born 1969), American stock car racer
- Troy Coker (born 1965), Australian rugby player
- Troy Cole (born 1986), American soccer player
- Troy Collings (born 1986), New Zealand businessman
- Troy Cook (born 1976), Australian football player
- Troy Cooley (born 1965), Australian cricket player
- Troy Corbett (born 1972), Australian cricket player
- Troy Cordingley (born 1967), American indoor lacrosse player
- Troy Cornelius (born 1983), Guyanese cricket player
- Troy Corser (born 1971), Australian motorcycle racer
- Troy Costa (born 1975), Indian fashion designer
- Troy Crowder (born 1968), Canadian hockey plaer
- Troy Curtis (born 1980), singer

==== D ====
- Troy Dalbey (born 1968), American swimmer
- Troy Danaskos (born 1991), Australian football player
- Troy Dandridge (born 1904), American baseball player
- Troy Daniels (born 1991), American basketball player
- Troy Dannen (born 1966), American athletics administrator
- Troy Dargan (born 1997), Australian rugby player
- Troy Davies (born 1959), Australian artist
- Troy Davis (born 1968), American convicted murderer
- Troy Dayak (born 1971), American soccer player
- Troy de Haas (born 1979), Australian athlete
- Troy Deeney (born 1988), English football player
- Troy Denning, American author
- Troy DeVries (born 1982), American basketball player
- Troy Dillinger, American actor
- Troy Dixon (born 1969), Australian cricket player
- Troy Donahue (born 1936), American actor and singer
- Troy Donockley (born 1964), British composer
- Troy Dorsey (born 1962), American boxer and kickboxer
- Troy Dorchester (born 1972), Canadian chuckwagon racer
- Troy Doris, American athlete
- Troy Douglas (born 1962), Dutch sprinter
- Troy Douglin (born 1982), English football player
- Troy Downing (born 1967), American politician
- Troy Drake (born 1972), American football player
- Troy Drayton (born 1970), Americacn football player
- Troy Duffy, American director
- Troy Dumais (born 1980), American diver
- Troy Dumas (born 1972), American football player
- Troy Dungan (born 1936), American meteorologist
- Troy Dunn, American actor
- Troy E. Dunn, United States Air Force general
- Troy Dusosky (1976), American soccer player
- Troy Duster (1936), American sociologist
- Troy Dye (1996), American football player

==== E ====
- Troy Edgar, American security official
- Troy Edwards (born 1977), American football player
- Troy Edwards (soccer) (born 1964), American soccer player
- Troy Eid (born 1963), American lawyer
- Troy Elder (born 1977), Australian field hockey player
- Troy Endicott (born 1971), American Space Force general
- Troy Evans (actor) (born 1948), American actor
- Troy Evans (American football) (born 1977), American football player

==== F ====
- Troy Fabiano, American soccer player
- Troy Fautanu (born 2000), American football player
- Troy Fegidero, Filipino football player
- Troy Findley (born 1964), American politician
- Troy D. Fitrell, American diplomat
- Troy Flavell (born 1976), New Zealand rugby player
- Troy Fleming (born 1980), American football player
- Troy Fletcher (born 1973), Australian rugby player
- Troy Franklin (born 2003), American football player
- Troy Fraser (born 1949), American politician
- Troy Fumagalli (born 1995), American football player

==== G ====
- Troy Galloway, United States Army general
- Troy Gamble (born 1967), Canadian hockey player
- Troy Garity (born 1973), American actor
- Troy Garner (born 1978), American soccer player
- Troy Gentile (born 1993), American actor
- Troy Gentry, American country music singer
- Troy Glasgow, British actor
- Troy Glass (born 2000), American actor
- Troy Glaus (born 1976), American baseball player
- Troy Graham (born 1949), American wrestler
- Troy Grant (born 1970), Australian politician
- Troy Leon Gregg (born 1948), American fugitive
- Troy Graves (born 1972), American criminal
- Troy Gray (born 1973), Australian football player
- Troy Gregory (born 1966), American musician
- Troy Grosenick (born 1989), American hockey player

==== H ====
- Troy Hairston (born 1998), American football player
- Troy Hall (born 1982), New Zealand rugby player
- Troy Halpin (born 1973), Australian football player
- Troy Hambrick (born 1976), American football player
- Troy Hartman (born 1971), American stunt performer
- Troy Hashimoto (born 1987), American politician
- Troy Hayden, American reporter
- Troy Headrick, American politician
- Troy Hearfield (born 1987), Australian soccer player
- Troy Hebert (born 1966), American politician
- Troy Heinert (born 1972), American politician
- Troy Herriage (born 1930), American baseball player
- Troy Hewitt (born 1990), English football player
- Troy Hickman, American comic book writer
- Troy Honeysett, Australian actor
- Troy Horne, American musician
- Troy Hudson (born 1976), American basketball player
- Troy Hunt, American security consultant
- Troy Hurtubise (born 1963), Canadian inventor

==== I ====
- Troy Isley (born 1998), American boxer

==== J ====
- Troy Jackson (born 1968), American politician
- Troy Lee James (born 1924), American politician
- Troy Jaques (born 1972), Australian rugby player
- Troy Johnson (cricketer) (born 1997), New Zealand cricketer
- Troy Johnson (footballer) (born 1977), Australian football player
- Troy Johnson (linebacker) (born 1964), American football player
- Troy Johnson (producer), American producer
- Troy Johnson (singer), American musician
- Troy Johnson (wide receiver) (born 1962), American football player
- Troy Johnson (writer) (born 1973), American writer
- Troy Jollimore (born 1971), Canadian-American poet
- Troy Jones (born 1998), English boxer
- Troy Jules (born 2000), Antiguan football player
- Troy Jutting, American hockey player

==== K ====
- Troy Kastigar (born 1981), American jihadist
- Troy Kell (born 1968), American murderer
- Troy Kelley (born 1964), American politician
- Troy Kelly (born 1978), American golfer
- Troy Kemp (born 1966), Bahamian high jumper
- Troy King (born 1968), American politician
- Troy Kingi (born 1984), New Zealand musician
- Troy Kinney (born 1871), American artist
- Troy Kopp (born 1971), American football player
- Troy Kotsur (born 1968), American actor
- Troy Kropog (born 1986), American football player
- Troy Kyles (born 1968), American football player

==== L ====
- Troy Ladd, American car designer
- Troy LaRaviere, American educator
- Troy Lehmann (born 1972), Australian football player
- Troy Lesesne (born 1983), American soccer coach
- Troy Lewis (born 1966), American basketball player
- Troy Lifford, Canadian politician
- Troy Limbo (born 1998), Filipino football player
- Troy Little (born 1973), Canadian cartoonist
- Troy Liu (born 2003), Taiwanese actor
- Troy Loggins (born 1995), American hockey player
- Troy Loney (born 1963), Canadian hockey player
- Troy Longmuir (born 1979), Australian football player
- Troy Luff (born 1969), Australian football player
- Troy Lyndon (born 1964), American businessman

==== M ====
- Troy Mader (born 1955), American politician
- Troy Makepeace (born 1979), Australian football player
- Troy Mallette (born 1970), Canadian hockey player
- Troy Mangen (born 1994), American football player
- Troy Mann (born 1969), Canadian hockey player
- Troy Kennedy Martin (born 1932), British screenwriter
- Troy Masters (born 1961), American journalist and editor
- Troy Mattes (born 1975), American baseball player
- Troy Matteson (born 1973), American golfer
- Troy McBroom (born 1983), American football player
- Troy McCarthy (born 1966), Australian football player
- Troy A. McGill (born 1914), American soldier
- Troy McIntosh (born 1973), Bahamian runner
- Troy A. McKenzie, American lawyer
- Troy McKeown, American politician
- Troy McLawhorn (born 1968), American musician
- Troy McLean (born 1979), New Zealand basketball coach
- Troy Meink, American government official
- Troy Melton (born 1921), American stuntman and actor
- Troy Melton (baseball) (born 2000), American baseball player
- Troy Menzel (born 1994), Australian football player
- Troy Merner, American politician
- Troy Merritt (born 1985), American golfer
- Troy H. Middleton (born 1889), American soldier
- Troy Milam (born 1980), American hockey player
- Troy A. Miller, American law enforcement official
- Troy Miller (film producer), American film producer
- Troy Moloney (born 1966), Australian football player
- Troy Montero (born 1971), Filipino-American actor
- Troy Montes-Michie (born 1985), American artist
- Troy Murphy (born 1980), American basketball player
- Troy Murphy (skier) (born 1992), American skier
- Troy Murray (born 1962), Canadian hockey player

==== N ====
- Troy Nathan (born 1983), New Zealand rugby player
- Troy Neal, American football player
- Troy Neel (born 1965), American baseball player
- Troy Nehls (born 1968), American politician
- Troy Neilson (born 1979), American musician
- Troy Neiman (born 1990), American baseball player
- Troy Newman (activist) (born 1966), American anti-abortion activist
- Troy Newman (singer) (born 1964), Australian singer
- Troy Nickerson (born 1987), American wrestler
- Troy Niklas (born 1992), American football player
- Troy Nixey (born 1972), Canadian comic book artist
- Troy Nolan (born 1986), American football player
- Troy L. Nunley (born 1964), American judge

==== O ====
- Troy O'Leary (born 1969), American baseball player
- Troy Oliver, American record producer
- Troy Olsen (born 1973), American musician
- Troy Omeire (born 2002), American football player
- Troy Onyango (born 1993), Kenyan writer

==== P ====
- Troy Paino (born 1962), American lawyer
- Troy Pannell, Australian football umpire
- Troy A. Paredes, American politician
- Troy Parfitt, Canadian writer
- Troy Parrott (born 2002), Irish soccer player
- Troy Patton (born 1985), American baseball player
- Troy Payne (born 1988), American basketball player
- Troy Pelshak (born 1977), American football player
- Troy Percival (born 1969), American baseball player
- Troy Perkins (born 1981), American soccer player
- Troy Perkins (rugby league) (born 1976), Australian rugby player
- Troy Perry (born 1940), American clergyman
- Troy Pezet (born 1974), Australian rugby player
- Troy Pickard (born 1973), Australian politician
- Troy Pina (born 1999), Cape Verdean swimmer
- Troy Pinder (born 1997), Bahamian football player
- Troy Podmilsak (born 2004), American skier
- Troy Polamalu (born 1981), American football player
- Troy Porter (born 1855), American civil rights leader
- Troy Victor Post (born 1906), American insurance executive
- Troy Powell (born 1969), American dancer
- Troy Price, American political strategist
- Troy Pride (born 1998), American football player
- Troy Puckett (born 1889), American baseball player
- Troy Purcell, American football coach

==== R ====
- Troy Ready (born 1980), American soccer player
- Troy Reddick (born 1983), American football player
- Troy Reeb (born 1969), Canadian media executive
- Troy Reeder (born 1994), American football player
- Troy Riddle (born 1981), American hockey player
- Troy Rike (born 1995), Filipino-American basketball player
- Troy Roberts (journalist) (born 1962), American journalist
- Troy Roberts (soccer) (born 1983), American soccer player
- Troy Roberts (musician), Australian musician
- Troy Robertson (born 1961), American photographer
- Troy Robinson, Australian rugby player
- Troy Romero, American politician
- Troy Rosario (born 1992), Filipino basketball player
- Troy Ross (born 1975), Guyanese-Canadian boxer
- Troy Rugless, Australian rugby player
- Troy Ruttman (born 1930), American racing driver
- Troy Ryan (born 1972), Canadian hockey player

==== S ====
- Troy Sachs (born 1975), Australian wheelchair basketball player
- Troy Sadowski (born 1965), American football player
- Troy Sanders (1973), American singer and bassist
- Troy Sanders (composer) (born 1901), American composer
- Troy Schumacher, American choreographer
- Troy Schwab (born 1984), Canadian hockey player
- Troy Schwarze (born 1981), Australian football player
- Troy Scribner (born 1991), American baseball player
- Troy Seals (born 1938), American musician
- Troy Selvey (born 1980), American basketball player
- Troy Selwood (born 1984), Australian football player
- Troy Shaw (born 1969), English snooker player
- Troy Shelley, American politician
- Troy Shondell (born 1939), American singer
- Troy Sienkiewicz (born 1972), American football player
- Troy Simmonds (born 1978), Australian football player
- Troy Simons (born 1996), American basketball player
- Troy Singleton (born 1973), American politician
- Troy Slaten (born 1975), American actor
- Troy Slattery (born 1973), Australian rugby player
- Troy Smith (businessman) (born 1922), American businessman
- Troy Smith (footballer) (born 1987), Jamaican football player
- Troy Smith (politician) (born 1965), American politician
- Troy Smith (wide receiver) (born 1977), American football player
- Troy Sneed (born 1967), American musician
- Troy Snitker (born 1988), American baseball coach
- Troy Snyder (born 1965), American soccer player
- Troy Southgate (born 1965), British political activist
- Troy Stark (born 1973), American football player
- Troy Stecher (born 1994), Canadian hockey player
- Troy Stedman (born 1965), American football player
- Troy Stetina (born 1963), American musician
- Troy Stockwell (born 1967), Australian water polo player
- Troy Stokes Jr. (born 1996), American baseball player
- Troy Stolz, Australian politician
- Troy Stone (born 1971), Australian rugby player
- Troy Stoudermire (born 1990), American football player
- Troy Stradford (born 1964), American football player
- Troy Streckenbach (born 1972), American politician
- Troy Stubbs, American politician

==== T ====
- Troy Talley, American politician
- Troy Tanner (born 1963), American volleyball player
- Troy Tate, English musician
- Troy Taylor (American football) (born 1968), American football coach
- Troy Taylor (Australian footballer) (born 1991), Australian rules footballer
- Troy Taylor (baseball) (born 2001), baseball player
- Troy Taylor (cricketer) (born 1984), Caymanian cricketer
- Troy Taylor (record producer), American record producer
- Troy Terry (born 1997), American hockey player
- Troy Thompson (rugby league), Australian rugby player
- Troy Thompson (guitarist), American musician
- Troy Thompson (politician) (born 1971), Australian politician
- Troy Tomlinson (born 1964), American music executive
- Troy Townsend (born 1965), British anti-racism activist
- Troy Trepanier, American automotive designer
- Troy Tulowitzki (born 1984), American baseball player

==== U ====
- Troy Ugle (born 1968), Australian football player

==== V ====
- Troy Van Leeuwen, American musician
- Troy Van Voorhis, American chemist
- Troy Verges, American songwriter
- Troy Vincent, American football player
- Troy Vollhoffer, Canadian entrepreneur
- Troy von Balthazar, American musician

==== W ====
- Troy Walker (born 1938), American singer
- Troy Walters (born 1976), American football coach
- Troy G. Ward (born 1962), American hockey coach
- Troy Waters (born 1965), Australian boxer
- Troy Waymaster, American politician
- Troy Weaver (born 1968), American basketball executive
- Troy Westwood (born 1967), Canadian football player
- Troy Wheless (born 1980), American basketball player
- Troy Williams (born 1994), American basketball player
- Troy Williams (Canadian football) (born 1994), Canadian football player
- Troy Williamson (born 1983), American football player
- Troy Williamson (boxer)(born 1991), English boxer
- Troy Wilson (Australian rules footballer) (born 1972), Australian football player
- Troy Wilson (defensive back) (born 1965), American football player
- Troy Wilson (defensive lineman) (born 1970), American football player
- Troy Wolverton (born 1971), American journalist
- Troy Woodruff, American politician
- Troy Wozniak (born 1978), Australian football player

==== Y ====
- Troy Yocum (born 1979), American veteran activist

=== Female ===
- Troy Byer, American psychologist and author
- Troy Garton (born 1988), New Zealand boxer
- Troy Mullins (born 1987), American professional golfer
- Troy Titus-Adams (born 1969), British actress

== Fictional characters ==
- Troy, fictional character in the video game Dying Light
- Troy Barnes, character in the television series Community
- Troy Bolton, character in the High School Musical films
- Troy McClure, a character in the television series The Simpsons
- Troy Tatterton, fictional character in the Casteel series of books

== See also ==
- Troy (surname)
- Troy (disambiguation)
