= George Floyd protests in Arizona =

2020 civil unrest after the murder of George Floyd

- Part of George Floyd protests
- Date: May 28 – October 17, 2020 (4 months, 2 weeks and 5 days)
- Location: Arizona, United States
- Caused by: Police brutality; Institutional racism against African Americans; Reaction to the murder of George Floyd; Economic, racial and social inequality
- Status: Concluded

Cities in Arizona in which a protest with about 100 or more participants was held

This is a list of George Floyd protests in Arizona, United States. Protests occurred in at least nineteen communities in the state, with protests continuing for five weeks in Phoenix.

== Locations ==
=== Ahwatukee ===
Family and alumni of two rival high schools, Mountain Pointe and Desert Vista, participated in a march organized by Rivals for Justice. The march began at 9:15 AM at Mountain Pointe with a few hundred individuals who then walked to Desert Vista to "raise awareness and participate in the movement that our nation and world is embracing."

=== Casa Grande ===
On June 6, dozens of protesters demonstrated at the intersection of Florence Boulevard and Cameron Avenue, in front of City Hall, in support of Black Lives Matter and George Floyd. Another group marched from Peart Park to join the City Hall protesters.

=== Chandler ===
Hundreds of people peacefully protested on June 2 in downtown Chandler. No arrests were made, and the protesters left at 8 PM.

=== Flagstaff ===
On May 29, approximately 1,000 protesters gathered at Flagstaff City Hall, then marched to Heritage Square and back. Minimal damage was reported to a window of the Flagstaff Police Department's Fourth Street substation window. Similar protests occurred on May 30.

=== Fountain Hills ===
On June 25, about 100 protesters gathered in Fountain Hills. The protest was originally scheduled for June 10, but it was postponed due to threats of armed response.

=== Gilbert ===
Several people were arrested after a fight between Black Lives Matter and Back the Blue rallies on August 20.

=== Kingman ===
A protest took place on June 2 at Locomotive Park, which gathered at least 40 people. One person was arrest for aggravated assault with a deadly weapon for pointing a gun at protesters.

=== Lake Havasu City ===
On June 3, a candlelight walk from Rotary Park to London Bridge was held. On June 6, a Black Lives Matter protest of roughly 150 people condemned police brutality and racial injustice.

=== Maricopa ===
On May 29, the NAACP held a candlelight vigil at Copper Sky Regional Park to honor George Floyd. On June 1, around 30 protesters demonstrated at Edison Road and State Route 347 to protest Floyd's murder and support Black Lives Matter. At day's end, the protesters, along with Maricopa Police Chief Steve Stahl, took a knee in honor of Floyd before the 8:00 pm curfew.

=== Mesa ===
On June 5, around 35 protesters gathered outside the Mesa Police Department and marched down Main Street to the Mesa City Council Chambers.

=== Nogales ===
On June 2, a few dozen protesters gathered in Nogales and marched to the border.

=== Phoenix ===
Protests took place in Phoenix for at least four weeks following Floyd's murder. Hundreds protested on May 28, with the police using pepper spray and tear gas. Police alleged that protesters destroyed windows and doors to the Arizona Federal Theater and a City of Phoenix government building, as well as several other municipal and private businesses and parked cars. Some lit fireworks and fired shots into the air. On May 29 a separate vigil in honor of Dion Johnson, a 28-year-old man who was shot and killed by a DPS trooper on May 25, was scheduled to be held outside the Arizona Department of Public Safety office, but the location was changed prior to the event to Eastlake Park in East-Central Phoenix. Following a vigil, hundreds of demonstrators marched nearly two miles to the Phoenix Police Department Headquarters located at the intersection of 7th Avenue and Washington Street. Protesters faced off with the police riot line for over two hours before being dispersed by police tear gas. At this time, several demonstrators proceeded to damage property in the vicinity including the FOX 10 Phoenix Studios, Arizona Federal Theater, Sandra Day O'Connor U.S. Courthouse, Phoenix City Court, Chase Tower, Arizona Center, and several other buildings. The protest dissipated by the early hours of May 30.

On the evening of May 30, protesters returned to Downtown Phoenix and protested at several locations. Police remained confrontational, and protesters continued to damage property and paint messages of solidarity on buildings and surfaces around the downtown area.

On May 31 in downtown Phoenix, mere hours after Governor Doug Ducey instituted a state-wide curfew from 8:00 pm to 5:00 am, police blocked street exits, then released tear gas into a captive crowd of protesters. The reason given for the attack was violation of a curfew which had been created by governor Doug Ducey earlier that day. Lacking streets to exit by, protesters fled into the nearby Garfield neighborhood, where police hunted them down. Police assaulted non-protesting neighborhood residents on their own property, including a woman on her front porch, according to statements made by residents to The Arizona Republic. The newspaper described police, rather than protesters, as the aggressors in the night's violence. Hundreds were arrested.

Thousands continued to gather for protests against police brutality on subsequent days in early June.

=== Peoria ===
A protest march was held on June 20 as protesters marched from Osuna Park to city hall. The protest was organized by 17-year-old Jacob Wise.

=== Prescott ===
More than 150 protesters demonstrated in front of the Prescott Valley Police Department. Minor skirmishes with a pro-law enforcement group were reported on May 30.

=== Safford ===
On June 1, about 20 protesters gathered outside the Graham County Chamber of Commerce on Highway 70.

=== Scottsdale ===
On May 30, hundreds of people protested in downtown Scottsdale, where rioters caused millions in damage to the Scottsdale Fashion Square area and 12 arrests were made. No officers were injured.

=== Surprise ===
On June 3, a few dozen protesters held a demonstration near the Surprise Police Department building and raised their fists when a police officer stopped in front of them to show solidarity.

=== Tempe ===
On June 11, an estimated several hundred to 1,000 protesters marched in Tempe with demands to defund the city police.

On July 27, approximately 150-200 protesters gathered at Tempe Beach Park and marched onto the Mill Avenue Bridge, occupying it for several minutes before proceeding east on the north shore of Tempe Town Lake. Protesters arrived at the intersection of N. Rural Road and E. Playa Del Norte Drive north of the Campus of Arizona State University. Protesters proceeded to occupy the intersection. After less than one minute, officers with Tempe Police Department began issuing orders to exit the intersection. Officers then proceeded to make arrests and use pepper spray and other munitions on protesters, who were largely peaceful. Seven protesters were arrested by Tempe Police on charges ranging from obstructing a public thoroughfare, hindering and interfering with police, disorderly conduct, resisting arrest, and aggravated assault on police, a class 5 felony in the State of Arizona.

=== Tucson ===
Hundreds of protesters marched through downtown Tucson on May 30. The protests included multiple downtown businesses' windows being broken as well as a dumpster being set on fire. By the end of the protest, protesters peacefully stood in front of police, who were in full riot gear. It was estimated that rioters caused more than US$200,000 of damage, and at least four arrests were made. Tucson Chief of Police, Chris Magnus, said that many of the people who incited the violence were not from the area. The following night, more protests occurred. The protest began downtown, and eventually made its way to the University of Arizona campus, where police appeared to push into the crowd of protesters. Eight people were arrested during the second night of protests. On June 2, hundreds of people gathered for a candlelight vigil to honor George Floyd at the Dunbar Pavilion. This event was widely regarded as peaceful. On Friday, June 5, around 2,000 people gathered at the University of Arizona's campus for a March for Justice Rally. The event was characterized as a "peaceful and healing space." On Saturday, June 6, thousands gathered to affirm that Black Lives matter. The event featured local Black artists and musicians and speakers called for defunding the police and encouraged attendees to denounce white supremacy.

=== Yuma ===
On May 30, over 150 activists displayed signs at a busy intersection and chanted "I Can't Breathe."

== Government response ==
Due to the violence that occurred during the protests in Phoenix, Scottsdale, and Tucson, Arizona governor Doug Ducey declared a state of emergency on May 31. The state of emergency declaration included an 8 pm curfew statewide banning all travel, other than first responders and people driving to and from work or to receive medical attention from 8 pm to 5 am. He also deployed the National Guard.
