= Troy Miller =

Troy Miller may refer to:

- Troy A. Miller, an American law enforcement official
- Troy Miller (film producer), an American film producer, director and screenwriter
- Troy Miller (Neighbours), a fictional character in the Australian soap opera Neighbours
