= Trye =

Trye is a surname. Notable people with the surname include:

- Charles Brandon Trye, English surgeon
- Hindolo Trye (died 2012), Sierra Leonean politician
- John Trye (born 1985), Sierra Leonean footballer
- Mary Trye (fl. 1675), English medical practitioner
- William Trye (1660–1717), English politician

== See also ==
- Troye
