= Takahiro Okada =

Japanese baseball player (born 1988)

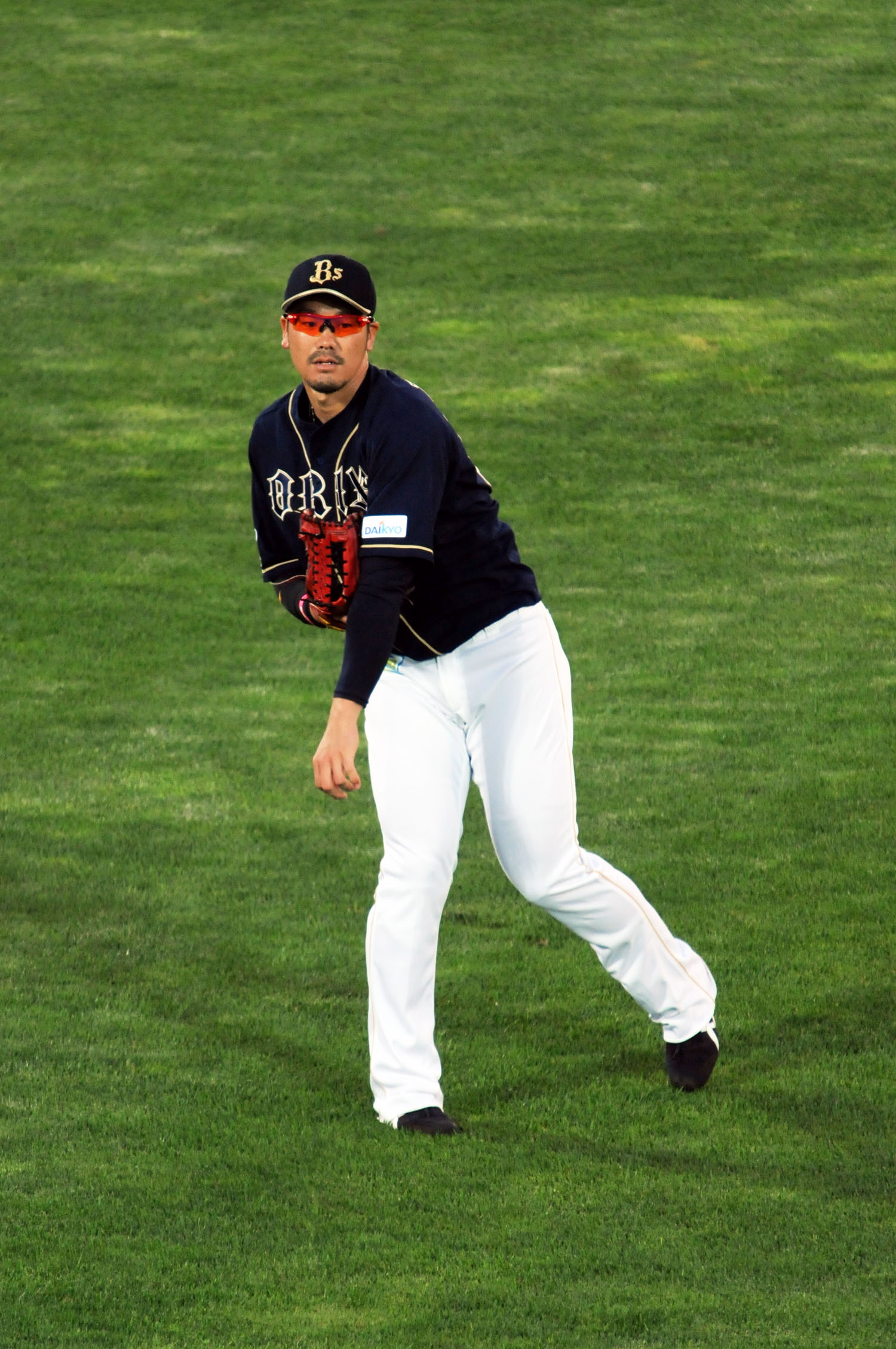
- T-Okada with the Orix Buffaloes
- Outfielder / First baseman
- Born: February 9, 1988 (age 38); Suita, Japan
- Batted: Left Threw: Left

NPB debut
- August 10, 2006, for the Orix Buffaloes

Last NPB appearance
- September 24, 2024, for the Orix Buffaloes

NPB statistics
- Batting average: .257
- Hits: 1,192
- Home runs: 204
- Runs batted in: 715
- Stolen bases: 32
- Stats at Baseball Reference

Teams
- Orix Buffaloes (2006–2024)

Career highlights and awards
- Pacific League Leader of Home Run (2010); Pacific League Best Nine Award (2010); Pacific League Golden Glove Award (2014); Japan Series champion (2022)

Takahiro Okada (岡田 貴弘, born February 9, 1988), or known by his playing name T-Okada (T-岡田), is a Japanese former professional baseball outfielder and first baseman who spent his 19–year career with the Orix Buffaloes of Nippon Professional Baseball (NPB) from 2006 to 2024.

== Career ==
Okada was selected by the Orix Buffaloes with their first-round pick of the 2005 draft.

Okada was only the second player in history to record a pinch-hit grand slam in 2010, he became the home run king(One of the title of NPB), after Nakanishi Futoshi (Nishitetsu Baseball Club) in 1955. In terms of RBIs, he was the first player to record 90 or more RBIs at the age of 22 in six years, since Nakajima Hiroyuki (Saitama Seibu Lions) in 2004. It was the first time in 14 years since Troy Neal in 1996 that an Orix player had become the home run king, and the first time in 37 years for a Japanese player since Nagaike Tokuji of the predecessor Hankyu Braves in 1973.

In 2007, Okada changed his batting style from a single-legged style to a sliding style to improve his accuracy. In the summer, he was called up to the Japanese national baseball team for the Beijing Pre-Olympic Games, and contributed to Japan's victory as a key player.

Okada was registered as an infielder in 2009. He changed his playing name to T-Okada to prevent confusion to then-newly hired manager Akinobu Okada. The following season he finished with 33 home runs, the most in Pacific League, so he opted to keep his new name despite Akinobu Okada leaving the team in 2012.

In 2010, T-Okada made his first appearance in the All-Star Game, and in the second game he started as the youngest fourth batter in the Pacific League (22 years and 5 months old), braking the record set by Kazuhiro Kiyohara (22 years and 11 months old) in 1990. In July, he won his first monthly MVP award with a batting average of .333, 9 home runs and 21 RBIs. On August 3 and 5, he hit two home runs in one game against Seibu, reaching his 28th homer, but then he fell into a slump and did not hit a homer in 15 games. However, on August 22, he recovered and hit two homers in one game against the Chiba Lotte Marines, achieving his pre-season goal of 30 homers. On September 8 against Lotte, he hit a double off Shunsuke Watanabe and ran to second base, suffering a torn muscle and being diagnosed with a six-week recovery period. However, eight days later, on September 16, in a game against Seibu, he came in as a pinch hitter in the bottom of the eighth inning with the score tied and the bases loaded with two outs, and recorded his first grand slam as a professional. It was the first time in nine years since Yasuo Fujii hit a pinch-hit grand slam for the team in 2001. He ended up hitting 33 homers (T-Okada was the only player to hit more than 30 homers in the Pacific League that year), becoming the first 22-year-old to win the home run title in 48 years since Sadaharu Oh. He was also the second player in history to record a pinch-hit grand slam in the same year he became the home-run king, after Futoshi Nakanishi (Nishitetsu) in 1955. It was also the first time in six years since Hiroyuki Nakajima (Seibu) in 2004 that a 22-year-old had recorded more than 90 RBIs. It was the first time in 14 years since Troy Neal in 1996 that an Orix player had won the home run title, and for Japanese players, it was the first time in 37 years since Tokuji Nagaike of the predecessor team, the Hankyu Braves, in 1973.

November 6, 2012, he was selected for the Japanese national team for the Samurai Japan Match 2012 (Japan vs. Cuba).

In 2014, T-Okada reduced weight from 104 kg to 98 kg, but developed back pain just before the opening day. Due to this, Okada made his first appearance on April 12, and since then he has been mainly established as the "5th batter and first baseman". Since then, Okada has maintained a batting average in the high 20s and steadily racked up home runs, hitting 20 home runs for the first time in four years in a game against the Nippon Ham Fighters on September 14. In the second game of the first stage of the Climax Series on October 12, Okada hit a three-run home run in the bottom of the eighth inning to turn the game around and bring the team its first Climax Series victory. He also won his first Golden Glove Award as a first baseman.

In 2016, T-Okada started camp in the second team due to pain in his left Achilles tendon, but started the season with the first team. Okada was batting fifth in the first half of the season, but after the game against Lotte on July 3, he was settled in the fourth position and showed signs of recovery, recording a team-leading 20 home runs and 76 RBIs. His defensive position was mainly left field (70 games), but he also played first base (43 games) and designated hitter (9 games).

T-Okada was appointed as the Representative of Japan Professional Baseball Players Association at Orix in 2017 . He started in the opening game as the sixth batter and first baseman. In March and April 2017, T-Okada recorded a batting average of .351 and seven homers, and was awarded his second monthly MVP. He was appointed in six different batting orders depending on the team's circumstances, including being used as the leadoff hitter for the first time since turning pro in the game against Nippon Ham on August 5. T-Okada hit his 150th professional homer in the game against Saitama Seibu on August 26. In the game against Chiba Lotte on September 29, he hit his 30th homer for the season, which was a record of 99,999th homer throughout NPB history. In the end, he recorded 31 homer and a career-best on-base percentage of .374.

T-Okada participated in the Puerto Rican winter league as a member of the Atenienses de Manatí (baseball) in 2019.

In 2020, T-Okada made the team's 8,500th home run record on September 9 against Seibu.

On September 28, 2021, against Lotte, T-Okada hit a three-run homer off Ayumu Ishikawa, achieving his 200th homer, and on September 30 against the same game, he hit a three-run homer off Naoya Masuda, contributing to three straight wins in the three-game series, where a loss of even one game would have lit up the magic number for Lotte to win the championship. He played in 115 games, with a batting average of .241, 17 homers, and 63 RBIs, and the team won its first league championship since turning pro.

Despite Orix's Japan Series victory in 2022, T-Okada had one of his lower hitting years, only finishing the year with a .149 batting average and a single homer, while driving in 10 runs in 36 games.

On September 8, 2024, T-Okada announced that he would be retiring after playing his final game on September 24.(T岡田選手現役引退のお知らせ) In 19 seasons in NPB, Okada played in 1,362 games and slashed .257/.330/.440 with 204 home runs and 715 RBI.
