= Douglin =

Douglin is a surname. Notable people with the surname include:

- Denis Douglin (born 1988), American boxer
- Rawle Douglin (1933–2023), Trinidad and Tobago Anglican bishop
- Troy Douglin (born 1982), English footballer
