= March Meet =

The March Meet is an independent drag race held at Famoso Raceway, a dragstrip located approximately ten miles north of Bakersfield, California. It began in 1959 under the sanction of the "Smokers Car Club" and was initially known as the "US Fuel & Gas Championships." The event became officially known by its nickname, the "March Meet," when the Smokers sold the rights to the name "US Fuel & Gas Championships."

In 1959 the first Smokers' March Meet was advertised as an "East-versus-West" showdown, with California drag racers taking on infamous Floridian Don Garlits, who had been credited with record speeds that the California crowd found dubious. That year, Garlits lost early. Art Chrisman triumphed and took Top Eliminator laurels.

From that first race forward, the roots of the event's continued success can be traced back its practice of permitting competition between nitromethane-burning dragsters when the fuel was banned by the National Hot Rod Association, who reluctantly relented its "Fuel Ban" in 1964.

Because of the Fuel & Gas Championships reputation as the most fiercely contest "outlaw" drag race, winning the event gave a drag racer immediate cachet. In 1962 Don Prudhomme gained national notoriety and became a touring professional after he defeated the Gotelli Speed Shop for Top Eliminator. In 1965, Garlits won Top Fuel that year, and has more than avenged his initial embarrassment, ultimately winning the March Meet an unprecedented five times. In 1966, "The Surfers" conquered Top Fuel by withstanding over 100 Top Fuel competitors. Winning driver Mike Sorokin had a son, Adam, who followed in his father's footsteps and won Top Fuel in 2010.

The race had been primarily a showcase for Top Fuel (née "Top Eliminator"), but in 1969, due to its rapidly rising popularity as a drag-racing class, Funny Car Eliminator was added to the March Meet's competition menu. Danny Ongais won the first Funny Car Eliminator at Famoso. In the 1980s, then-rising star John Force won Funny Car at the March Meet three times, in 1984, 1986 and 1987.

Local Bakersfield-based racer James Warren dominated Top Fuel Eliminator in the 1970s, three-peating in 1975, 1976 and 1977.

In 1982, in a drag racing first, two women squared off in the Top Fuel final. Lucille Lee prevailed, and Shirley Muldowney was second best. This result prevented Muldowney from repeating as March Meet Top Fuel champion, as she had won the event the year before. https://archive.today/20140224223349/http://www.dragracingonline.com/nowthen/viii_3-2.html. The last modern version held in 1988 saw Don Garlits bring his Swamp Rat I to make exhibition runs during the event and a widely released professional 1 hour video of the race was released. The now-defunct Nostalgia Drag Racing Association began promoting the March Meet from 1989, but failed to attract enough competitors or spectators to remain viable though ran it anyway. The March Meet continued as a "nostalgia drag race" in 1994 under sanction by the Goodguys Vintage Racing Association. That year Bill Dunlap won Top Fuel, in a race car designed to represent the AA/Fuel Dragster or "front-engine" style of Top Fuel. That historic style of Top Fuel Eliminator is the class that has competed at the March Meet since its resurrection.

In 2004 veteran racer Jim Murphy won Top Fuel for a fourth time. Also, Funny Car Eliminator returned to competition at the March Meet. Like the Top Fuel dragsters, the Funny Car class kept its shape and style fashioned to the more traditional "AA/FC" style, with body styles limited to 1970s productions. By 2007, the Goodguys VRA had relinquished its claim on producing the March Meet, with the rights assumed by John and Blake Bowser, who lease Famoso Raceway from the National Hot Rod Association. Moreover, rules and technical inspection have been assumed by the NHRA Hot Rod Heritage Series.
