= Goodguys Rod & Custom Association =

Goodguys Rod and Custom Association
- Category: street rods, custom cars
- Jurisdiction: United States
- Founded: 1983
- Headquarters: Roanoke, Texas
- President: Marc Meadors

Official website
- www.good-guys.com
- (United States)

The Goodguys Rod & Custom Association is the largest association in the U.S. catering to street rods, custom cars and show cars. The Goodguys Association has over 70,000 active members worldwide. Goodguys stages 15 annual rod & custom car show events throughout the United States as well as vintage drag races.

Founded by Gary and Marilyn Meadors, Goodguys corporate headquarters are in Roanoke, Texas. Their son, Marc Meadors serves as company president.

The largest event Goodguys produces annually is the PPG Nationals in Columbus, Ohio, at the Ohio Expo Center. It attracts over 6,500 rods, customs, classics and street machines through 1999 vintage. The Goodguys Street Machine of the Year and the Goodguys Street Rod of the Year awards are presented at this event.

== Rod and custom events ==
Since 1987, Goodguys has held what are known as their National Summer Series events. Held at fairgrounds and super speedways around the country in cities such as Pleasanton, California, Del Mar, California, Scottsdale, Arizona, Columbus, Ohio, Dover, Delaware, Des Moines, Iowa, Fort Worth, Texas, and other cities, these rod and custom events feature thousands of hot rods and custom cars on display as well as vendor midways, live nostalgic music and stage shows, model car competitions, how-to seminars and even some vintage drag racing. In 2025, Goodguys will stage 15 rod and custom events in 10 states.

== Vintage drag racing events ==
Goodguys has been the leading promoter of vintage or nostalgia style drag racing competition since their first such vintage drag race, held in April 1989 at Infineon Raceway in Sonoma, California. From 1994 through 2006 Goodguys staged the West Coast Championship Series which at the time was America's premier points circuit for vintage drag racing. Also in 1994, Goodguys resurrected the March Meet drag races at Famoso Raceway in Bakersfield, California, tapping into the event's rich heritage. Over time, the Goodguys March Meet became the world's largest vintage drag race attracting over 600 competitors and a crowd in excess of 50,000. Goodguys staged their last March Meet, over two weekends in March 2006. The event was never concluded as rainouts and track preparation problems forced the cancellation of the event.

Today Goodguys holds Friday Night Drag Race programs catering to sportsman racers who race vehicles through 1999 vintage. The events feature gassers and super stockers and hundreds of popular drag machines in vintage trim.

== Goodguys founder Gary Meadors ==
Gary Meadors is the founder and former Chairman of the Board of the Goodguys Rod & Custom Association. Gary grew up in the small central valley farming community of Dinuba, California. He built up his first hot rod at the age of 14, taking a 1947 Plymouth and installing a modified flathead Chrysler Six engine and then lowering the suspension until the car nearly scraped the ground – a Meadors rodding trademark to this day.

Meadors has accomplished several milestones in his hot rodding career including membership in the prestigious Bonneville 200 mph (320 km/h) Club when he drove the Dozier & Hegarty blown flathead Chrysler-8 powered streamliner to a record speed of 223.220 mph (359.238 km/h) at the Bonneville Salt Flats in 1994. In 1995, Gary was given the STREET RODDER Magazine Lifetime Achievement award. He was inducted into the Street Rod Marketing Alliance Hall of Fame in 1998 and at the 2004 SEMA show in Las Vegas, Meadors received the Hot Rod Industry Alliance (HRIA) “Lifetime Achievement” award for his contributions to the world of hot rods and customs. He died on December 27, 2015, at his home in Arizona.

== History ==
The first Goodguys event was staged in 1983 in Pleasanton, California at the Alameda County Fairgrounds. It was a one-day car show which welcomed all years, makes and models of American Cars and Trucks. It was called the All American Get-Together. Held on a Saturday in March, the event attracted over 650 cars. In 1987, Goodguys went national with a small team of employees staging ten events across the country during the spring and summer catering to hot rods and custom cars and has continued this tradition ever since, expanding the schedule to include 24 events in 17 states in 2008. Throughout the 21-plus year run of the Goodguys summer series, Goodguys have staged more than 530 total events. In 2003, Goodguys became the world’s largest rodding association and now has over 70,000 active members worldwide.

The Goodguys Rod & Custom Association headquarters are located in a 10-story facility located at Texas Motor Speedway, overlooking Turn 2. Goodguys employs a team of 26 full-time staff members.

The Goodguys organization through the years set up many programs to highlight young talents and builders such as the "Trendsetter Award" which was awarded to Troy Ladd of Hollywood Hot Rods in 2007.

== Goodguys Gazette ==
Since 1989, Goodguys has published the "Goodtimes Gazette" magazine which is distributed monthly to all association members. The publication was produced 8 times per year from 1989 through 1991. Starting with the October 1991 issue, the magazine went into production on a monthly basis. The magazine covers Goodguys events in depth but also features hot rodding Industry pioneers, Young Rodders and other stories of interest to hot rod and custom car enthusiasts. It also includes a cars for sale section.

== Advertising ==
For a while, Goodguys events were advertised by a Wolfman Jack sounding spokesman.
