= Chaylon Brewster =

Canadian music producer

- Genres: Hip hop, Acid Jazz
- Occupation(s): Producer, Mixer, Mastering, Multi-Instruments
- Years active: 1996–Present
- Website: Official Website

Chaylon Brewster, better known as Nevski, is a Canadian-born music producer who has created sound for the likes of Mike Dean, Tanya Herron, Prentiss Church and Nelly's label, Derrty Ent.

Brewster was born on May 6, 1982, in Bridgewater, Nova Scotia, where he lived for the first 12 years of his life later moving to Kingsville, Ontario, a suburb of Windsor, Ontario, where he gained most of his exposure to the Hip Hop scene. Later in 1998 he moved to Charlottetown and focused heavily on the local hip hop scene there.

In 2001, he was contacted by Brockway Biggs, an up-and-coming rapper from New Brunswick to produce a remix to his song, "The Pimp-T Theme", which was later nominated for an East Coast Music Award in 2003. In 2004 Brewster again produced the hit from Brockway Biggs' second album, Shake Ya Caboose, which was nominated in 2005 for an East Coast Music Award which finally took home the award for best Urban Recording.

In 2006 Shake Ya Caboose was picked up by Nelly's label, Derrty Ent, to be a Canadian promotional song for their new energy drink, Pimp Juice. Brewster was again asked to make a whole new beat for the track, and then Guinness Book record holder D.O. and Derrty Ent's Prentiss Church were included in the track alongside Brockway Biggs. The track was released on April 20, 2007.

== Sources ==
- PJ News
- :: Hip Hop Canada ::
- Pimp Tea
- Gracenote Music: Albums - Pimp-T :: Power Is Mindful Peace
