= KSAZ-TV =

Television station in Phoenix, Arizona

- Phoenix, Arizona; United States
- Channels: Digital: 10 (VHF); Virtual: 10
- Branding: Fox 10 Phoenix; Fox 10 News

Programming
- Affiliations: 10.1: Fox; for others, see § Subchannels

Ownership
- Owner: Fox Television Stations; (NW Communications of Phoenix, Inc.)
- Sister stations: KUTP

History
- First air date: October 24, 1953
- Former call signs: KOY-TV (shared operation, 1953–1954); KOOL-TV (1953–1982); KTSP-TV (1982–1994)
- Former channel numbers: Analog: 10 (VHF, 1953–2009); Digital: 31 (UHF, 2000–2009)
- Former affiliations: Independent (1953–1954, September–December 1994); ABC (1954–1955); CBS (1955–1994)
- Call sign meaning: From slogan adopted in 1994, "The Spirit of Arizona"

Technical information
- Licensing authority: FCC
- Facility ID: 35587
- ERP: 48 kW
- HAAT: 558 m (1,831 ft)
- Transmitter coordinates: 33°20′3″N 112°3′46″W
- Translator(s): KUTP 10.2 (26.4 UHF) Phoenix; for others, see § Translators

Links
- Public license information: Public file; LMS
- Website: www.fox10phoenix.com

KSAZ-TV (channel 10) is a television station in Phoenix, Arizona, United States. It is owned and operated by the Fox network through its Fox Television Stations division alongside KUTP (channel 45), an independent station with MyNetworkTV. The two stations share studios on West Adams Street in Downtown Phoenix; KSAZ-TV's transmitter is located atop South Mountain.

Channel 10 was the third television station established in the Phoenix area, making its first broadcast on October 24, 1953. It was originally allocated as a shared-time channel to stations run by the owners of Phoenix radio stations KOOL and KOY, though both KOOL-TV and KOY-TV operated from the same building. After a year as an independent, it became Phoenix's original ABC affiliate in early 1954. KOOL-TV bought out KOY-TV later in 1954 and absorbed its staff, becoming a full-time station. After switching affiliations to CBS in 1955, KOOL-TV rose to become Phoenix's highest-rated station under the ownership of Gene Autry and Tom Chauncey. A falling-out between Autry and Chauncey ended with the sale of KOOL-TV to the Gulf United Corporation in 1982; separated from its sister radio properties, channel 10 changed its call sign to KTSP-TV. Initially, the station remained the news leader in Phoenix; however, in the late 1980s and early 1990s, the station lost ground in the news ratings to an ascendant KTVK, which had poached two key KTSP-TV executives as part of a successful effort to turn itself around. Channel 10's ratings decline was not helped by several visible personnel miscues.

In February 1994, KTSP-TV changed its call letters to KSAZ-TV. Three months later, as part of the first act in a national realignment of network affiliations initiated by then-owner New World Communications, the station announced it would switch from CBS to Fox. Phoenix was one of the most affected markets; the timing of affiliation contract expirations led to three changes in four months. KSAZ lost CBS in September 1994 but did not begin airing Fox programming until December. Coinciding with the switch to Fox was a major expansion of the station's news department, including new morning and prime time newscasts. However, the three months of forced independent status and miscalculations around syndicated programming and new competitors caused the station's ratings to fall dramatically, with some newscasts losing half their viewership.

Fox acquired the New World stations in 1996 and steadied the struggling operation, instituting a flashier style to bring it more in line with its target audience. From 1999 to 2021, future Arizona gubernatorial and senatorial candidate Kari Lake was one of the station's main anchors. By 2020, KSAZ-TV produced twelve hours a day on weekdays of local news programming.

== History ==
=== Shared-time era and early years ===
While the Federal Communications Commission (FCC) worked its way toward ending a years-long freeze on new television station grants initiated in 1948, it issued a near-final version of the table of allocations for Arizona in 1951 that gave Phoenix channels 4 (changed to 3 the next year), 5 (KPHO-TV, the only pre-freeze station in the state), 8, and 10. KOOL (960 AM), Phoenix's CBS radio affiliate, had previously expressed interest in filing for channel 7 prior to the amended table being released, and on September 27, 1951, it applied for channel 10.

KOOL was not alone in its interest. In July 1952, KOY (550 AM), the home of the Mutual Broadcasting System in Phoenix and one of the oldest stations in the state, filed its own bid. The two bids portended what could have been years of comparative hearings over who got the construction permit. To avoid this, in May 1953, KOOL and KOY struck a deal that would result in both getting construction permits to share time on channel 10. The time-sharing proposal, first used by the FCC in television in grants for channel 10 in Rochester, New York, and suggested to KOOL and KOY by the commission, was approved on May 27, 1953, with KOOL-TV and KOY-TV getting construction permits the same day. Under the proposal, the stations would alternate daytime and evening telecasting.

KOOL was the CBS radio affiliate in Phoenix, and KOOL expressed a desire to similarly align its new television station, but this would not be immediately possible. KPHO-TV, which held both CBS and ABC hookups after KTYL-TV signed on with NBC earlier in May, had just signed a renewal agreement with CBS a month and a half before the construction permits were granted. Even though the two stations would have separate staffs and ownership, much of the physical plant would be shared, including a maximum-power transmitter site on South Mountain. Originally proposing to build television studios behind the KOY radio studios near First Avenue and Roosevelt Street, KOOL and KOY arranged instead in July to buy a former car dealership at Fifth Avenue and Adams Street; KOY wanted to continue using the other site for parking. Studio construction started in August, with KOOL and KOY crews leading the way, and a test pattern went out for the first time on October 19, 1953, ahead of both stations' October 24 launch. The next day, channel 10 carried an opening program featuring KOY and KOOL management, including KOOL majority owner Gene Autry.

As shared-time stations, KOOL-TV and KOY-TV were a conjoined unit: separate staffs, common facilities, and no network affiliation at all. This changed in January 1954, when channel 10 picked up an ABC affiliation; now, each of the three major networks had their own outlet in Phoenix. However, KOY-TV would not last much longer. In March 1954, KOOL reached a deal to buy out KOY's stake in channel 10. KOY general manager Albert D. Johnson believed that the station would do better under one operator instead of two and stated that the goal of the shared-time venture—to avoid lengthy comparative hearings—had been met. The FCC approved the deal—reported as $400,000 by newspapers and $200,000 to the FCC—on May 5, allowing KOOL-TV to become the sole occupant of channel 10. All staff were retained by the enlarged KOOL-TV. It was the first time any of the post-freeze shared-time arrangements had been wound down.

=== CBS affiliation and Autry-Chauncey ownership ===
On December 29, 1954, KOOL-TV announced it had secured the CBS affiliation in Phoenix, to begin on June 15, 1955. KPHO-TV, whose two-year affiliation agreement ended at that time, was blindsided by the move, but it was a natural fit. Not only was KOOL radio already CBS in Phoenix, but Gene Autry had deep ties to CBS radio and television, as well as Columbia Records. ABC soon found a new home: startup outlet KTVK (channel 3), which joined that network on March 1, 1955.

Mr. Chauncey has always been a guy who has said, "We're going to be first class. We're going to be No. 1. And we're going to do it the right way."

— Bob Davies, longtime KOOL radio-television employee, on Tom Chauncey's management philosophy

As a full-time CBS affiliate, it was now able to feature Autry's show Gene Autry's Melody Ranch on its schedule. Tom Chauncey, who also owned the biggest Arabian horse ranch in Phoenix, was a minority partner with Autry. Over the years, KOOL-TV ran nearly the entire CBS schedule; Chauncey was a fierce loyalist to the network. In addition to local news, channel 10 produced a series of other local programs, such as the bilingual children's program Niños Contentos and investigative and feature series Chapter 10 and Copperstate Cavalcade.

Phoenix audiences' loyalty to KOOL-TV was proven in 1971. That September, a group of Valley business leaders led by Del Webb, organized as the Valley of the Sun Broadcasting Company, filed an application for a competing channel 10 proposal to KOOL-TV's license renewal; this group proposed to return the channel to Phoenix-based ownership. However, the KOOL-TV license challenge was met with a decidedly cool reception by viewers and power brokers alike. Senators Barry Goldwater and Paul Fannin and governor Jack Williams threw their support behind KOOL; Goldwater noted he often cited KOOL as an example of a quality television station, Fannin was "amazed" to learn of the counterproposal, and Williams—a former broadcaster—lauded its "record of public service" and inclusion of minority groups. Further, hundreds of phone calls and letters in support of KOOL were received by the station. Ten days after the application was first made public, Valley of the Sun abandoned their channel 10 bid. It was later revealed that the same Washington law firm had backed a string of similar license challenges to other stations across the country. After the license challenge was rebuffed, Chauncey became the majority stakeholder as a result of a sale of shares by Autry.

In 1978, KOOL AM was sold to Stauffer Communications of Topeka, Kansas, with the FM and television stations remaining under the Autry–Chauncey ownership. However, cracks began to form in the longtime ownership partnership of KOOL-FM-TV. That same year, Autry allegedly began to try and induce Chauncey to reach an agreement with Signal Oil upon which the latter company would have the option to buy Chauncey's stake at his death. Chauncey then began negotiating to buy Autry out. These talks ended in April 1981 when Autry sold half of his 48.11-percent stake in the company to the Gulf United Corporation of Jacksonville, Florida. That May, Autry sued Chauncey, alleging that he had mismanaged the assets of KOOL Radio-Television, Inc., to the tune of millions of dollars and had diverted company funds to Arabian horses, cars, and airplanes. Chauncey then filed a countersuit, accusing Autry and Gulf of racketeering and trying to pressure longtime manager Homer Lane, who owned a small but pivotal stake in the firm, to sell. In the wake of the dueling lawsuits, and as early as November 1981, speculation began to circulate that Chauncey and Lane were nearing a sale of their stakes to Gulf.

=== Gulf, Taft, and Great American ===
On June 8, 1982, Tom Chauncey and Gulf United announced that the latter was buying out the remaining shares in KOOL-TV, with KOOL-FM to be retained by Chauncey and split from the firm; the dueling lawsuits would be dropped when the FCC approved the transaction.

We told people for a long time that it stood for Tempe, Scottsdale, Phoenix, but I don't know if anyone really believed it.

— Tom Dolan, news director in 1994, when the KTSP-TV call sign was dropped

The sale closed on October 1, 1982, a month after receiving FCC approval, and major changes followed at channel 10. The first was a change in call sign, as the FM station retained the KOOL designation. The next morning, KOOL-TV became KTSP-TV; while Gulf claimed that it stood for "Tempe, Scottsdale, Phoenix", the more likely reason was that it mirrored another channel 10 station owned by Gulf, WTSP in St. Petersburg, Florida. Homer Lane, the general manager and minority owner, was replaced by Jack Sander, hired from WTOL in Toledo, Ohio. Gulf also invested in new production equipment to give KTSP a more high-tech look, and it completed a project started under Chauncey to replace the transmitter and tower on South Mountain.

Logo used by channel 10 under the KTSP call sign from 1982 to 1989. This logo was similar to that used by Gulf-owned WTSP.

In 1985, Taft Broadcasting acquired Gulf Broadcasting, which had been spun out of Gulf United two years prior. The deal included the entire chain, but so interested was Taft in Phoenix that it obtained an option to buy KTSP-TV alone for $250 million if the entire Gulf deal were to collapse, and KTSP-TV was the most expensive of the properties it purchased from Gulf. Not long after Taft acquired Gulf, however, a major management change occurred that would have long-term ramifications in Phoenix television. KTVK, which had until that time been a perennial third-place finisher in local news, poached Bill Miller, channel 10's news director, to be its station manager and hired Phil Alvidrez, the KTSP-TV assistant news director, to run its newsroom. The two hires by channel 3 were partly responsible for KTVK climbing to the top of the Phoenix television market in the late 1980s and early 1990s. On October 12, 1987, Taft was restructured into Great American Broadcasting after the company went through a hostile takeover by investors led by Carl Lindner. KTSP nearly lost its CBS affiliation in 1988; CBS was in negotiations to purchase KPHO from Meredith Corporation. Network officials were interested in buying a station in a fast-growing Sun Belt market. However, talks foundered when neither party could agree to a purchase price.

Other subsidiaries of Great American Communications Corporation filed for Chapter 11 bankruptcy in 1993, a move that did not affect the television and radio holdings. The station changed its call sign to KSAZ-TV on February 12, 1994, to match its new slogan, "The Spirit of Arizona".

=== As a Fox station ===
After emerging from bankruptcy, Great American Broadcasting (renamed Citicasters soon after) put four of its stations (including KSAZ-TV) up for sale, seeking to raise money to pay down debt and fund more acquisitions in radio. KSAZ-TV, along with WDAF-TV in Kansas City, Missouri; WGHP in High Point, North Carolina; and WBRC in Birmingham, Alabama, were sold to New World Communications on May 5, 1994, for $360 million.

Just 18 days later, New World announced that twelve of its 15 stations (those it already owned and those it was in the process of acquiring) would switch their varying Big Three network affiliations to Fox, which had been affiliated with KNXV-TV (channel 15). A major catalyst for the Fox-New World deal was the network's newly signed contract with the National Football League's National Football Conference. New World's portfolio, dominated by CBS affiliates, included many stations that had long aired the home games of NFC teams in their home cities, such as KSAZ and the Phoenix Cardinals.

The affiliation changes—three of them in all—played out in phases. CBS was the first to move, returning to KPHO-TV on September 10, 1994, after 39 years on channel 10. However, KNXV's affiliation contract with Fox did not run out for another three months. In the interim, KSAZ-TV became an independent station, filling the holes once occupied by CBS programming with movies and additional syndicated shows while also using the opportunity to debut a suite of new news programs. Fox programs moved to KSAZ on December 12.

It's pretty much a flop in every category.

— Dave Walker, television writer for The Arizona Republic, assessing the aftermath of KSAZ-TV's switch to Fox

In the aftermath of the change, channel 10 management faced the task of melding the station's more mainstream image with the new Fox programming, which proved difficult. Not only did the news programs rate poorly, but the station let go of valuable news lead-ins Jeopardy! and Wheel of Fortune as skewing too old in viewership, and the competition by KTVK and KNXV was more aggressive than KSAZ-TV had anticipated. In June 1995, general manager Ron Bergamo resigned after seven years and in the wake of sweeps figures showing the station's news ratings in some time slots had fallen by as much as 50 percent; that same month, an article in The Dallas Morning News called what happened to KSAZ a "worst-case scenario". Revenue reportedly dipped across the New World stations by 15 percent after their switches; New World management, however, also noted that the three months without network programming had led to the decline being more pronounced at KSAZ than elsewhere. As with most other New World stations, KSAZ declined to run Fox Kids programming, which instead moved to KTVK; in September 1995, KASW (channel 61), a station programmed by KTVK, launched with The WB and Fox Kids programs.

News Corporation purchased New World Communications, acquiring only its ten Fox-affiliated stations, in July 1996; the merger was finalized on January 22, 1997, making KSAZ an owned-and-operated station of Fox. This status almost became short-lived: in February 1997, Fox nearly traded KSAZ and sister station KTBC in Austin, Texas, to the Belo Corporation in exchange for Seattle's KIRO-TV. Fox began to upgrade the station's programming, adding some high-rated off-network sitcoms (such as M*A*S*H, Seinfeld and King of the Hill) as well as higher-rated syndicated court and reality shows. In the 2010s, Fox began to use KSAZ-TV and other stations on a regular basis to test new programs that later entered national syndication, such as TMZ Live—which KSAZ was the second station to air—and The Real.

Fox Television Stations purchased KUTP (channel 45) in 2001 as part of its acquisition of United Television; this resulted in the creation of Phoenix's second television duopoly.

In 2006, Jordin Sparks won an opportunity to audition for American Idol after winning KSAZ's own "Arizona Idol" competition; she ultimately went on to win the season.

== News operation ==
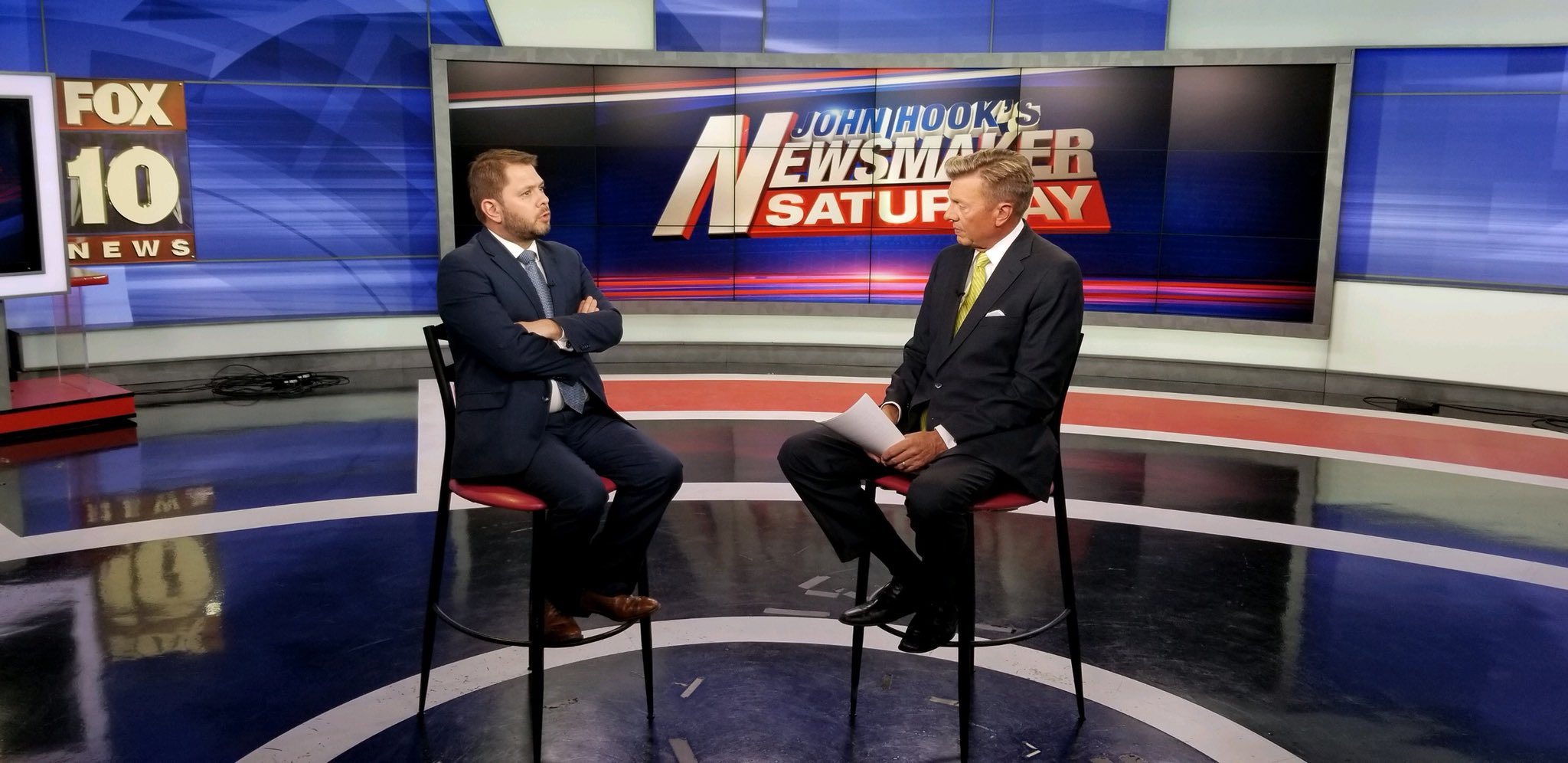
Congressman Ruben Gallego on John Hook's Newsmaker Saturday in 2019

In 1964, Chauncey merged the KOOL radio and television news departments into a single division under the management of Bill Close, formerly of KOY radio. Close was an 18-year veteran of Phoenix radio and television at the time, and KOOL billed him as "the Dean of Arizona Newscasters". The newsroom grew from six people when Close arrived to 23 by 1970, making it the largest among Phoenix's four news-producing stations; a helicopter, the first of several, was also added to the KOOL arsenal at that time. Under Close's watch, KOOL News 10 became the perennial news leader in Phoenix. At one point, channel 10's dominance was so absolute that its 6 p.m. newscast (anchored by Close) attracted 46 percent of all TV households in the market, the same share as the CBS Evening News with Walter Cronkite. The news department was largely a reflection of the bola tie-wearing Close. According to his longtime anchor desk partner, Mary Jo West—the second full-time female anchor in Phoenix—Close took a fatherly attitude toward his reporters and placed a high premium on accuracy and professionalism.

The station's success produced people who went on to larger jobs, both in and out of Phoenix. In 1979, Kent Dana—who would become a fixture at KPNX and later KPHO—was hired from KOOL-TV, where he was anchoring the weekend news, by channel 12. KOOL was also the first Phoenix television station to win a Peabody Award, doing so in 1980 for a documentary, The Long Eyes of Kitt Peak.

On May 28, 1982, at about 5 p.m., Joseph Billie Gwin, wanting to "prevent World War III", forced his way into the KOOL-TV studios and fired a shot from his gun. The butt of the gun struck Luis Villa in the back of the head; Gwin then held Villa in a chokehold, at gunpoint, for nearly five hours. Gwin took four people hostage and demanded nationwide airtime. Two of the hostages, Jack Webb and Bob Cimino, were released three hours later. At 9:30 p.m., anchor Bill Close read a 25-minute statement as Gwin sat next to him holding a gun under the table; Close took Gwin's gun after the statement and set it on the table. Gwin surrendered to the police following the broadcast of the statement; he was charged with kidnapping, assault, and burglary and was later declared insane. Gwin was put on parole and placed in a halfway house but violated that parole after assaulting two convenience store clerks in 1984; he was released from prison in 2006.

Channel 10 remained at the top of the ratings for a time after becoming KTSP-TV. However, in the late 1980s, after KTVK poached Miller and Alvidrez, channel 10's news ratings began to decline, not helped by a series of unforced errors. In 1989, KTSP newscaster Shelly Jamison left the station after appearing as both a cover model and posing nude in a Playboy pictorial. The most publicized move, however, was the 1991 dismissal of anchor Karen Carns, who found out she had been fired 15 minutes before the evening newscast when a newspaper reporter called to get her reaction. In the February 1992 sweeps, KTSP-TV lost the lead at 6 p.m. in both the Arbitron and Nielsen ratings, the first time in memory that it had failed to win that timeslot. That year, Close retired from channel 10 after a 28-year career, having stepped down from the anchor desk four years earlier.

With the Fox switch, KSAZ-TV added 30 news staffers and increased its news output from three hours a day to seven, with the addition of the two-hour morning newscast Arizona Morning, an additional early evening newscast at 5:30 p.m., and a 9 p.m. news hour, Arizona Prime. A simulcast of KTAR talk show McMahon Live with Pat McMahon was also added in late mornings. However, the switch proved to be very messy for the newsroom. Close, who said he felt "betrayed" by the affiliation switch, predicted that the station would lose its standing in local news. Ratings for KSAZ-TV's other newscasts declined after the switch, prompting morale to fall. Arizona Morning was retooled just months after its debut, and Heidi Foglesong—the former KTVK anchor who was the show's centerpiece—left after just over a year. The McMahon program was dropped in January 1996.

After two years of a news product that was more staid and conservative than had become the norm for a Fox station, things began to change in 1996 under new news director Bill Berra, who promised to "bring up the intensity". Presentation was revamped that fall; the sound of an emergency siren was incorporated into the opening of the 10 p.m. newscast. One anchor, June Thomson, increased her delivery speed at the behest of the new management, but the relationship broke down, and Thomson took a job at KGO-TV in San Francisco. She told the San Francisco Examiner that the station practiced "crime and body-bag journalism, just like Miami" and that she "watched the destruction of a once-fine newsroom" at channel 10. Arizona Prime was replaced in April 1997 with Fox 10 News at Nine.

On April 1, 2009, Fox Television Stations and the E. W. Scripps Company, owner of KNXV-TV, announced the formation of Local News Service, a model for pooling newsgathering efforts for local news events in which each station provided employees to the pool service in exchange for the sharing of video. KPHO-TV eventually joined the Phoenix LNS agreement shortly after the announcement. By 2020, all four English-language television newsrooms in Phoenix shared a helicopter.

In 2014, KSAZ debuted an expanded Saturday morning newscast and a new Sunday morning news hour. KSAZ added a 4 p.m. weekday news hour, a second half-hour to its 10 p.m. newscast, and a 7 p.m. nightly hour of news for KUTP in 2018. By 2020, KSAZ-TV's daily news output had reached twelve hours on weekdays.

Phoenix was also the starting point for LiveNow from Fox, the over-the-top streaming news offering from Fox Television Stations. It began as "Fox 10 News Now" in November 2014, streaming for seven hours a day on the station's website and YouTube channel. In 2020, production of the service was spread between the Fox stations in Phoenix, Orlando, and Los Angeles.

=== Former on-air staff ===
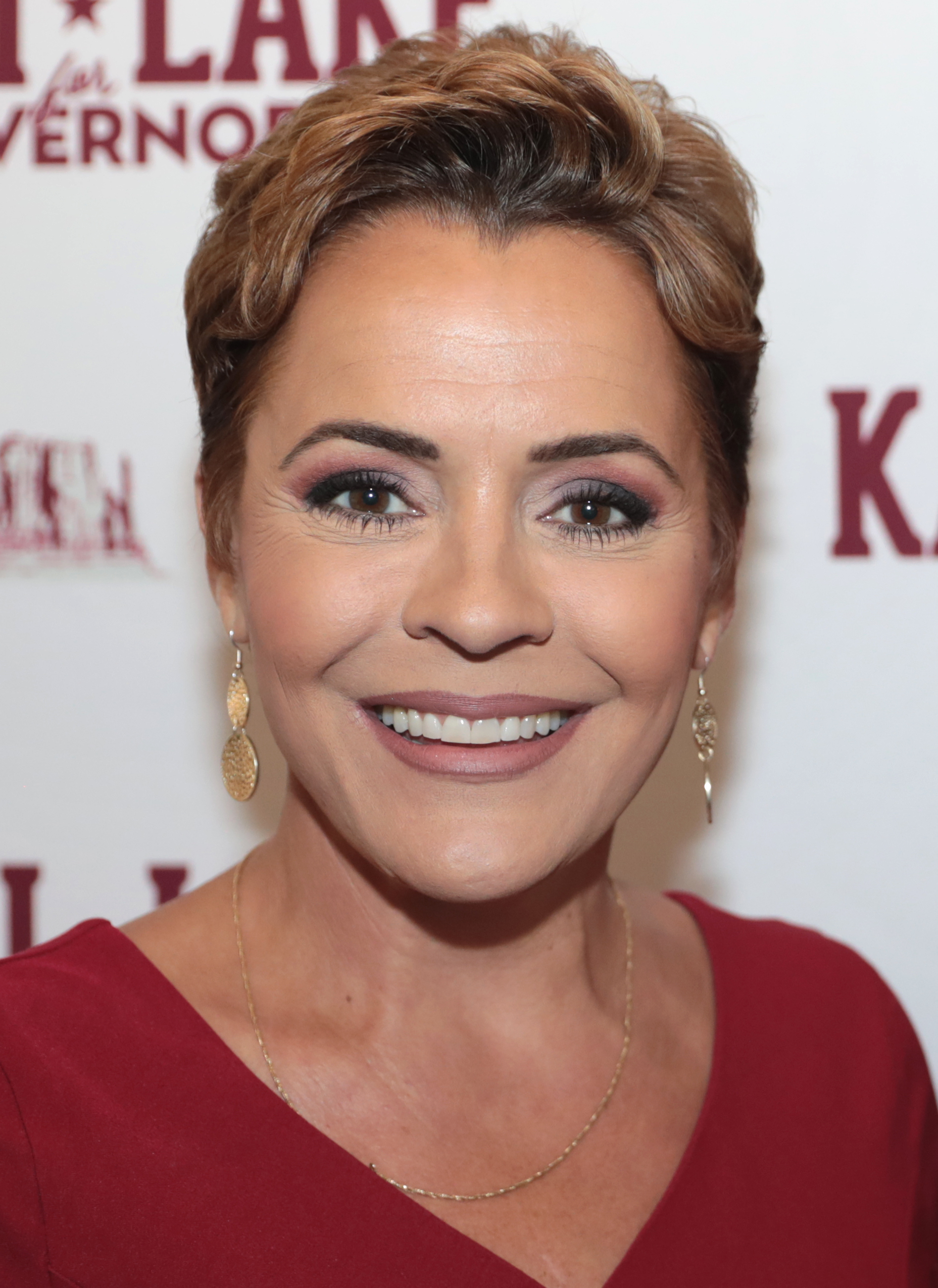
Prior to running for Governor of Arizona in 2022, Kari Lake spent more than 20 years as a news anchor at KSAZ-TV.

- Walker Edmiston – host of a puppet show, 1962–1963
- Troy Hayden – evening and morning anchor, 1994–2024
- J. D. Hayworth – sports anchor, 1987–1994
- Kari Lake – anchor, 1999–2021
- Geoff Morrell – reporter, 1995–1996
- Anne Montgomery – sports reporter, 1987–1989
- Vicky Nguyen – investigative reporter/collaborator, 2004–2007
- Bob Petty – anchor and reporter, 1970–1971
- Kinsey Schofield – reporter
- Siera Santos – sportscaster, 2020–2022
- Peter Van Sant – anchor/reporter, 1978–1982

== Technical information ==
=== Subchannels ===
KSAZ-TV broadcasts from South Mountain. Its signal is multiplexed:

Subchannels of KSAZ-TV
Subchannel	Res.	Short name	Programming
10.1	720p	KSAZ-TV	Fox
10.3	480i	Heroes	Heroes & Icons
10.4	480i	Roar	Roar
10.5	480i	FOX WX	Fox Weather
61.4	480i	HSN	HSN (KASW)

Broadcast on behalf of another station

Virtual channel 10.2 is assigned to a KUTP simulcast of 10.1 for the convenience of UHF antenna viewers. Three subchannels on the multiplex are hosted for KASW, Phoenix's ATSC 3.0 (NextGen TV) station, which in turn broadcasts KSAZ in that format.

=== Analog-to-digital conversion ===
KSAZ-TV began broadcasting a digital signal, initially in standard definition only, on October 15, 2000. KSAZ-TV shut down its analog signal, over VHF channel 10, at 8:30 a.m. on June 12, 2009, the official date on which full-power television stations in the United States transitioned from analog to digital broadcasts under federal mandate. The station's digital signal relocated from its pre-transition UHF channel 31 to VHF channel 10 for post-transition operations.

=== Translators ===
KSAZ-TV is broadcast on these translators in northern and northwestern Arizona:

- Bullhead City: K07YJ-D
- Chloride: K17NS-D
- Clarkdale: K36AE-D
- Colorado City: K27EJ-D
- East Flagstaff: K26NG-D
- Kingman: K29LO-D
- Lake Havasu City: K22NK-D
- Littlefield: K31EA-D
- Peach Springs: K36PE-D
- Prescott: K25OM-D
- Snowflake: K36QP-D
- Williams: K31NE-D
- Needles, CA: K17BN-D
