= Peter Van Sant =

American television journalist (born 1953)

- Born: February 21, 1953 (age 73); Seattle, Washington, U.S.
- Education: Washington State University
- Occupations: News anchor, reporter, writer, correspondent of 48 Hours
- Notable credit(s): four Emmy Awards, three Edward R. Murrow Awards, two Overseas Press Club Awards, Sigma Delta Chi Award, Alfred I. duPont–Columbia University Award

Peter Van Sant (born February 21, 1953) is an American television news reporter and correspondent for 48 Hours.

== Early life and education ==
Van Sant was born on February 21, 1953, in Seattle, Washington. He graduated cum laude from Washington State University in 1975 with a bachelor's degree in Communications.

== Career ==
After graduation Van Sant worked for KAPY-LP in Port Angeles, WA. He joined KMVT-TV in Twin Falls, Idaho, in 1975. He worked for Cedar Rapids-based KCRG-TV from 1976 through 1977, and from 1977 through 1978 for Omaha-based KETV. In 1978, he joined KOOL-TV in Phoenix, Arizona, as weekend anchor and reporter. In 1982, he moved to Dallas and worked at WFAA-TV until 1984.

In 1984, Van Sant joined CBS News and worked in Atlanta as a correspondent for CBS Evening News for the next six years. His investigative report on high number of medical helicopter crashes won him his first Emmy Award in 1986. In 1989 he was assigned to the London bureau from where he reported on the collapse of Soviet Union, the first Gulf War, reunification of Germany and famine in Africa. He moved to New York in 1991 and reported for CBS News magazines Street Stories until 1993, and America Tonight until 1994. He was then assigned to CBS Evening News where he worked until 1997 and received his second Emmy Award for his report on the economic and social collapse in Albania. In 1997–1998 Van Sant was named a correspondent for Public Eye with Bryant Gumbel. He was the first TV journalist who reported on devastating famine in North Korea, a documentary which won him his third Emmy Award. He was also a part of the CBS News undercover investigative team which taped an indicted war criminal in Bosnia. Van Sant reported on major national events including September 11 attacks, Hurricane Katrina, Virginia Tech massacre and interviewed many celebrities such as Julie Andrews, Christopher Plummer, Garth Brooks, Nick Nolte, Lee Ann Womack, and Ronnie Dunn and Kix Brooks. He also reported 48 Hours Special on Oklahoma City bombing in a documentary called Day of Reckoning.

Throughout his career Van Sant always liked to focus on stories involving "controversy and confrontation", following stories from early stages to their concurrent status, such as one on Lori Berenson, an American jailed in Peru since 1995.

== Works ==
Van Sant has co-authored the book Perfectly Executed, based on a story featured on the 48 Hours Mystery television show. In 2006, he also wrote the script and produced the documentary Three Days in September about the Beslan school hostage crisis, which premiered on Tribeca Film Festival. Narrated by Julia Roberts, the film won Van Sant his fourth Emmy Award and was named one of the top documentaries of 2006. The documentary also won the prestigious Golden Word Award of Russia.

== Honors and awards ==
- Four Emmy Awards
- Three Edward R. Murrow Awards for his 48 Hours Mystery reports
- Alfred I. duPont–Columbia University Award for his reports on the collapse of the Soviet Union
- Overseas Press Club Award for his investigative reports on illegal organ trading in Peru and report on Lori Berenson
- American Women in Radio and Television Award for his report on rapes in war-torn Bosnia
- Sigma Delta Chi Award for the report on worldwide human trafficking awarded in 2005.
