= Troye =

- Pronunciation: /trɔɪ/
- Gender: Unisex

Origin
- Origin: English and Irish
- Meaning: "foot soldier"

Other names
- Variant form: Troy

Troye is a surname and unisex given name. Notable people with the name include:

- Edward Troye (1808–1874), American painter
- John de Troye (died 1371), Irish judge
- Olivia Troye (born 1976), American official
- Raymond Troye (1908–2003), Belgian army officer and writer
- Troye Sivan (born 1995), Australian singer-songwriter and actor

== Other uses ==
- Recuyell of the Historyes of Troye, 15th century French book by Raoul Lefèvre
- The Seege of Troye, Middle English poem
