= Troy Neilson =

Brockway Biggs
- Also known as: Brockway Biggs, Pimp Tea, Pimp T
- Born: Troy Neilson
- Origin: Fredericton, New Brunswick, Canada
- Genre: Canadian rap
- Occupations: Publicist, rapper
- Years active: 1995 to present
- Label: Brockway Entertainment
- Website: http://www.brockwaybiggs.com/

Troy Neilson (born c. 1979) is a Canadian rapper based in Ottawa, Ontario, performing with the stage name Brockway Biggs. He previously performed as Pimp-T or Pimp Tea ("Positively Influencing More People to Excel Artistically").

== Early life and education ==
Neilson grew up in Charters Settlement, southwest of Fredericton. He graduated with a Master's degree in Computer Science from the University of New Brunswick in May 2006. His song "Can I Get a CS" mentions the names of several faculty members and references Gillin Wing, the section of the building where the Computer Science classes are located.

== Career ==
While a student in New Brunswick, Neilson began performing Pimp Tea. He released an album which received nominations at the 2000 Canadian Urban Music Awards. He also wrote for the magazine HipHop Canada. and reviewed music for The Brunswickan.

His two albums received four nominations at the ECMA in 2003 and 2005. Pimp Tea has performed on MusiquePlus, ZeD (CBC), Breakfast Television, and at the 2003 Canada Winter Games, and has received music video play on MuchMusic and MusiquePlus.

Pimp Tea's single "Shake Ya Caboose", produced by Chaylon Brewster, won a 2005 East Coast Music Award ("ECMA") for "Urban Single of the Year" and charted on about 35 stations.

In 2005, Neilson moved to Ottawa, Ontario. Soon after, he retired the Pimp Tea nickname and began performing as Brockway Biggs. In 2007 he released an album under this name, In Awe of Simplicity; the album appeared on the !earshot Top 20 Hip Hop campus and community radionchart in October of that year. He also contributed a track, "invisible", to the compilation album Full of It, produced by Sean One.

In 2010 Brockway Biggs released a compilation album, Canadian Rap Future Superstars, with tracks contributed by a number of rappers.
