= Troy Ladd =

American car designer

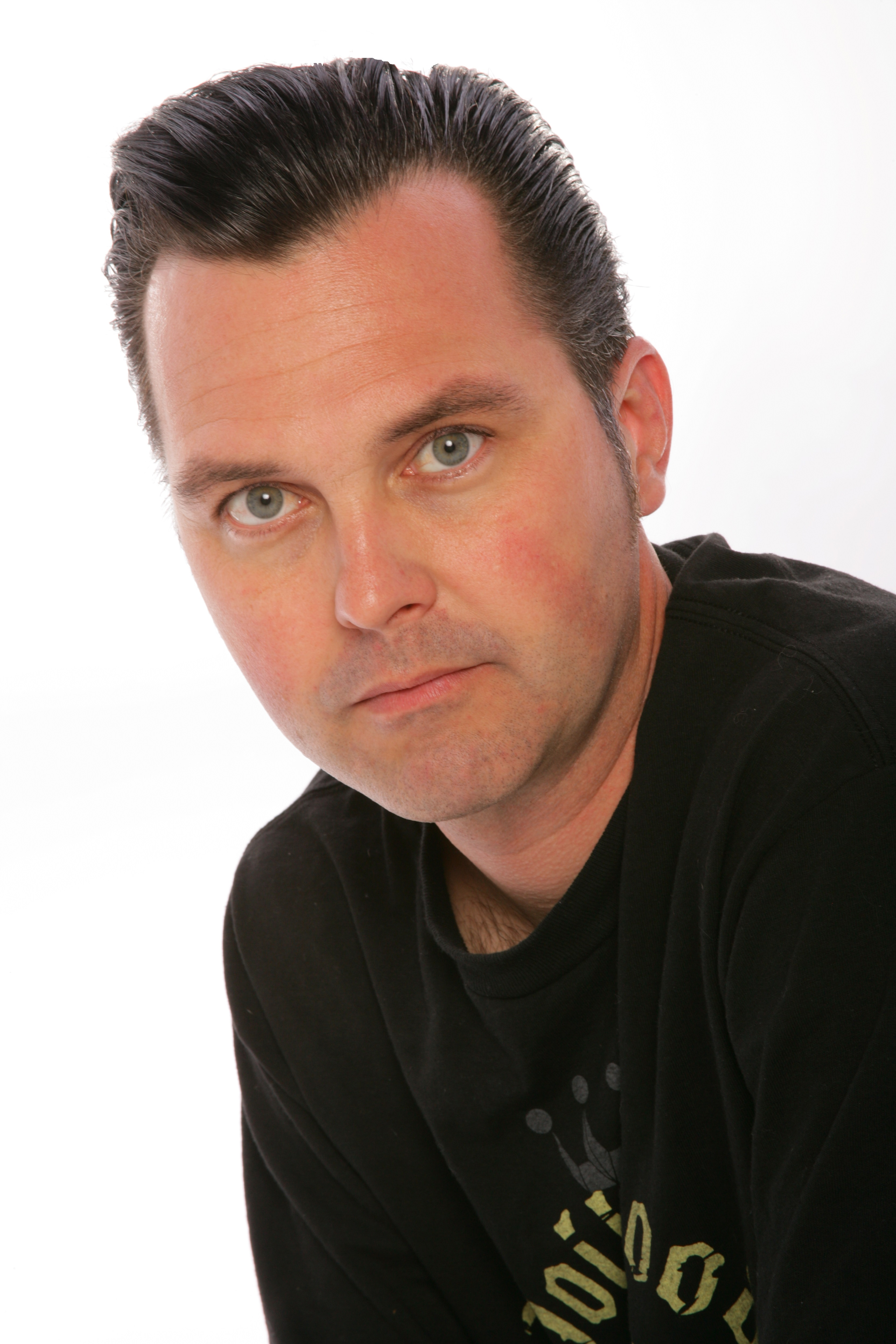
- Born: Newport Beach, California, United States
- Occupations: Hot Rod and Custom Car builder
- Website: www.hollywoodhotrods.com

Troy Ladd (born in Newport Beach, CA) is an American designer and builder of custom cars and hot rods from Burbank, CA known for building traditional styled vehicles. After obtaining a bachelor's degree in business from Vanguard University, Ladd formulated a business plan for Hollywood Hot Rods, taking into account location, size of the building and equipment. In 2002 Headquarters for Hollywood Hot Rods were set up in Burbank, CA. Industry magazines took notice of the cars being built at Hollywood Hot Rods and titles such as Street Rodder Magazine, Hot Rod Magazine and Rod & Custom were responsible for getting the word out about Troy Ladd's shop.

== Car builder ==
Starting at an early age, Ladd began working on vintage vehicles with the desire to create unique cars. Troy developed his building skills on his own cars and transferred them into a business building specialty cars for customers of his Hollywood Hot Rods, the business he established in 2002. Troy Ladd builds vehicles in a style inspired by hot rodding's past that “Respects Tradition” at the same time looking forward into the future of specialty car building.

Building award-winning vehicles for over a decade Troy Ladd has been recognized as the Goodguys Rod & Custom Association/SEMA 2007 Trendsetter Award Recipient, Grand National Roadster Show 2010 Builder of the Year and L.A. Roadsters 2012 Builder of the Year. Troy Ladd builds vehicles that range from hot rods like the “Respect Tradition” 1932 Ford Roadster to customs like the “Ruby Deluxe” 1935 Ford Coupe.

Ladd has produced a series of noted hot rods including: The Mulholland Speedster 1936 Custom Coachbuilt Packard, The Long Beach Legend 1936 Ford Roadster, Full Metal Jacket 2014 Ford Mustang GT Convertble, the Street Rodder Road Tour ’40 Ford Coupe, the Zulu T 1927 Ford Tall Model T Coupe, The Brooklands Special 1932 Ford Roadster, Coyote Comet 1963 Mercury Comet Convertible, the Raybestos Coyote-powered 1932 Ford Roadster Pickup, the Platinum Bomb 1932 Ford Roadster, Ruby Deluxe 1935 Ford Coupe, El Correcaminos 1931 Ford Roadster Pickup, The Black Widow 1926 Ford Roadster Pickup, Respect Tradition Hemi-powered and sectioned 1932 Ford Roadster

== Awards ==
- 2017 SEMA "Battle of the Builders", for the "Mulholland Speedster"
- 2017 Hot August Nights, Reno - "Hot August Nights Cup" for the "Mulholland Speedster"
- 2017 Goodguys Del Mar Street Rod D' Elegance Award for the "Mulholland Speedster"
- 2017 Chicago World of Wheels Legend's Cup Award for the "Mulholland Speedster"
- 2017 Sacramento Autorama Sam Barris for the "Mulholland Speedster"
- 2017 Sacramento Autorama Custom D' Elegance Award for the "Mulholland Speedster"
- 2017 Sacramento Autorama World's Most Beautiful Custom for the "Mulholland Speedster"
- 2017 Grand National Roadster Show America's Most Beautiful Roadster for the "Mulholland Speedster"
- 2016 Grand National Roadster Show America's Most Beautiful Roadster finalist for "The Long Beach Legend" 36 Ford and 32 Ford Roadster pickup
- 2015 Grand National Roadster Show America's Most Beautiful Roadster finalist for "Black" 32 Ford Roadster
- 2012 L.A. Roadsters “Builder of the Year" - Troy Ladd.
- 2011 “SAR Mark of Excellence in Metalworking Award”, awarded to Troy Ladd.
- 2011 Grand National Roadster Show “Best Roadster” winner to Troy Ladd for “Brooklands Roadster”.
- 2010 Grand National Roadster Show “Builder of the Year- Troy Ladd”.
- 2010 SEMA “Showstopper Award” to Troy Ladd for 1932 Ford “Raybestos” Roadster Pickup.
- 2010 Goodguys “Kustom of the Year” awarded to Troy Ladd for “Ruby Deluxe” 1935 Ford.
- 2009 Grand National Roadster Show Troy Ladd's “Black Widow” 1927 Ford Roadster Pickup finalist for America's Most Beautiful Roadster, “Best Display”.
- 2007 Goodguys Rod & Custom Association Trendsetter Award Recipient: Troy Ladd.
- 2007 Troy Ladd's “Respect Tradition" 1932 Ford hi-boy roadster finalist for America's Most Beautiful Roadster.
- 2007 “Outstanding Elegance Award” for Troy Ladd's “Respect Tradition” 1932 Roadster at Blackie's Invite-Only Autorama.
- 2007 Del Mar Car Show, Best 1932 Roadster Award to Troy Ladd.
- 2005 Troy Ladd SEMA Feature Vehicle Award in Hot Rod Alley.
- 2005 Troy Ladd Goodguys “Rodders Pick”.
