= Troy Tatterton =

Fictional character

Troy Langdon Tatterton is a fictional character created by V. C. Andrews and continued by ghostwriter Andrew Neiderman in the bestselling novels in the Casteel series. Troy is the handsome and wealthy creator behind the inventions in the Tatterton Toy empire. He lives on the Farthingale estate in the cottage in the middle of the hedge maze.

== Premonitions ==
Troy is reclusive and isolated when Heaven first meets him, shutting himself off from the outside world and living alone in his cottage. Heaven, however, begins to convince him to allow her into his life, only to discover that he has dreams of his own death and doesn't believe he will live much longer. He reveals that he dreamt of Leigh's death years ago, and doesn't understand why he goes on living when they were the same, both longing for things that can't be found in this world, and in a sense, Heaven.

== Troy and Heaven ==
Troy and Heaven became lovers and intended to marry. Their happiness was cut short, however, when Tony revealed they were in fact uncle and niece, as he had raped Heaven's mother, and was in fact Heaven's father. Devastated, Heaven went on to marry Logan Stonewall when she believed Troy had died, yet upon his return they had one more night together, resulting in the birth of their daughter Annie. Troy and Heaven never saw each other again, and when she died and was buried on the Farthingale estate, Troy was seen by his daughter as a ghost figure who visited Heaven's grave and wept for his lost love.

== Annie Stonewall ==
Annie Stonewall is Troy's daughter who was raised by Logan, and only later discovered the truth of her parentage after her mother's death. Annie and Troy became close, yet he never left Farthingale except for the birth of his grandchildren.

== Return from the dead ==
Troy is said by Tony to have ridden Jillian's Arabian horse Abdulla Bar into the ocean, and died. It seems that his premonitions had at last come true, but ironically in the form of a suicide as he couldn't live without loving Heaven. An error occurs in the series, however, as Tony tells Heaven in Dark Angel (written by V. C. Andrews) that Troy's body was found, yet in Fallen Hearts ghostwriter Neiderman brings Troy back to life, reasoning that Troy faked his own death to find freedom and peace away from everyone he once knew.
