= Troy Mullins =

American World Long Drive competitor

Troy Mullins (born March 28, 1987) is a World Long Drive competitor from Los Angeles, Calif. Mullins competes in events that are sanctioned by the World Long Drive Association, which is owned by Golf Channel, part of the NBC Sports Group, and a division of Comcast. The season-long schedule features events airing live on Golf Channel, culminating in the Volvik World Long Drive Championship in September.

== World Long Drive career ==
In 2017, Mullins won her first World Long Drive Tour event at the Mile High Showdown (Colorado). In 2018, she advanced to the semifinals at the Clash in the Canyon (Nevada), Ak-Chin Smash in the Sun (Arizona) and Atlantic City Boardwalk Bash (New Jersey), each of which aired live on Golf Channel.

== Before World Long Drive ==
Prior to competing in World Long Drive, Mullins was a heptathlete, competing in track and field at Cornell University, where she studied China-Asia Pacific studies and international relations (becoming fluent in both Mandarin and sign language) while competing in the 200-meter, 800-meter, 100-meter hurdle, high jump, long jump, shot put and javelin.

Mullins qualified for her first Volvik World Long Drive Championship in 2012, after picking up the game in 2008 upon suffering a hamstring injury that led her to stepping away from track and field. She never used an actual driver until 2012.

== Personal life ==
In addition to competing in World Long Drive, Mullins also spends her time as an academic tutor.
