= Chris Magnus =

American law enforcement professional (born 1960)

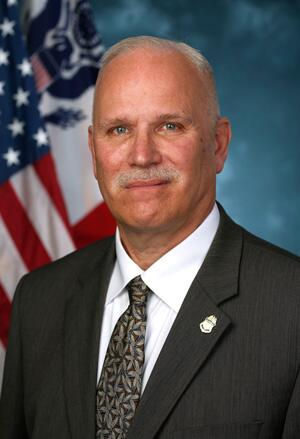

Commissioner of U.S. Customs and Border Protection
- In office December 13, 2021 – November 12, 2022
- President: Joe Biden
- Preceded by: Kevin McAleenan
- Succeeded by: Rodney S. Scott (2025)

Personal details
- Born: Christopher Magnus; October 26, 1960 (age 65) Lansing, Michigan, U.S.
- Spouse: Terrance Cheung (m. 2014)
- Education: Lansing Community College; Michigan State University (BCJ, MA)

Christopher J. Magnus (born October 26, 1960) is an American former law enforcement professional who served as the commissioner of U.S. Customs and Border Protection from 2021 to 2022. He was previously chief of police in Tucson, Arizona; Fargo, North Dakota; and Richmond, California. He is an advocate of community policing and of sanctuary cities and states.

On November 12, 2022, Magnus submitted his resignation to President Joe Biden, who was reported to have requested it days prior. Magnus had initially refused to resign and was threatened with termination if he did not.

== Early life and education ==
Magnus was born in Lansing, Michigan. His father was a faculty member at Michigan State University, an immigrant from Norway, and his mother a piano teacher. His maternal grandmother was born in Germany. He is a graduate of the police academy at Lansing Community College and has a bachelor's degree in criminal justice and a master's degree in labor relations from Michigan State University.

== Career ==
=== Lansing, Michigan ===
Magnus began his police career as a dispatcher in the Lansing Police Department, and was also a paramedic. After graduation from the police academy, he became a deputy sheriff in the Livingston County Sheriff's Department and in 1989 a police officer in the Lansing department, where he was promoted to captain. He also served as an instructor at the Mid-Michigan police academy.

=== Fargo, North Dakota ===
From 1999 to 2006, Magnus headed the police department in Fargo, North Dakota. While there he helped create the first regional dispatch center covering parts of two states, a refugee liaison program, and a forensic interview center for children, and cooperated widely with other organizations and agencies.

=== Richmond, California ===
Magnus became chief of the Richmond, California, Police Department in 2006. He emphasized community policing, which the search committee had wanted, hired more women and underrepresented minorities and changed procedures and incentives to have police officers build relationships with neighborhood residents, including listing beat officers' schedules and cellphone numbers, created an Office of Professional Accountability outside the department to oversee its internal affairs, made greater use of social media to communicate with the public, and introduced a gunshot location system.

There were 38 homicides in Richmond in Magnus's first year, 47 in 2007, when by crimes per resident it was the ninth most dangerous city in the country, and also in 2009, but only 11 in 2014, the lowest number since 1971. The reduction in crime and improvement in relations between the police department and the community in Richmond during Magnus' time there, including a substantial reduction in instances of police firing their guns, led the Department of Justice to have him investigate the problems in policing in both Ferguson, Missouri, and Baltimore. (The homicide rate rose again in Magnus' last year in Richmond, and his arrival coincided with initial planning for the Office of Neighborhood Safety, a controversial city-funded program run by DeVone Boggan that seeks to reduce homicides by providing grants to those identified as being most likely to shoot someone or to be shot in the next year.)

In late 2006, Magnus, who is white, was sued for racial discrimination by seven high-ranking black members of the department. A three-month trial in 2012 ended with the jury rejecting all claims. In April 2015 an Asian American former police officer sued the city of Richmond for wrongful dismissal, partly on grounds of claimed racial prejudice by Magnus and initially also claiming that Magnus, who is gay, had sexually harassed him. A judge issued a summary judgment in the city's favor on some of the remaining claims in summer 2016, and the rest were dismissed by agreement in February 2017.

In December 2014, Magnus was photographed holding a Black Lives Matter sign at a protest. He described the photograph, which was widely circulated and was disapproved of by many in the department, as happening spontaneously after a participant asked to take a selfie with him when he and his command staff were at the protest talking to people, and had sent out for pizza to feed the crowd.

=== Tucson, Arizona ===
Magnus became chief of the Tucson Police Department in January 2016, succeeding Roberto Villaseñor, who was retiring. He has since been quoted in opposition to Arizona's 2010 laws against illegal immigration as complicating policing in the state. In December 2017 he published a New York Times op-ed arguing that President Donald Trump's and Attorney General Jeff Sessions's policy of firm opposition to local sanctuary city policies would be damaging to policing; in March his department had declined to assist Border Patrol agents pursuing an escaped detainee.

On June 24, 2020, Chief Magnus offered his resignation to Tucson Mayor Regina Romero, the City Manager, and Tucson City Council, following the death of a civilian while in the custody of Tucson Police. The incident occurred two months before in April, but was not made public until June 22, when officers' body cameras were released to news media. Three officers resigned just before they were to be terminated for the incident.

=== Customs and Border Protection ===
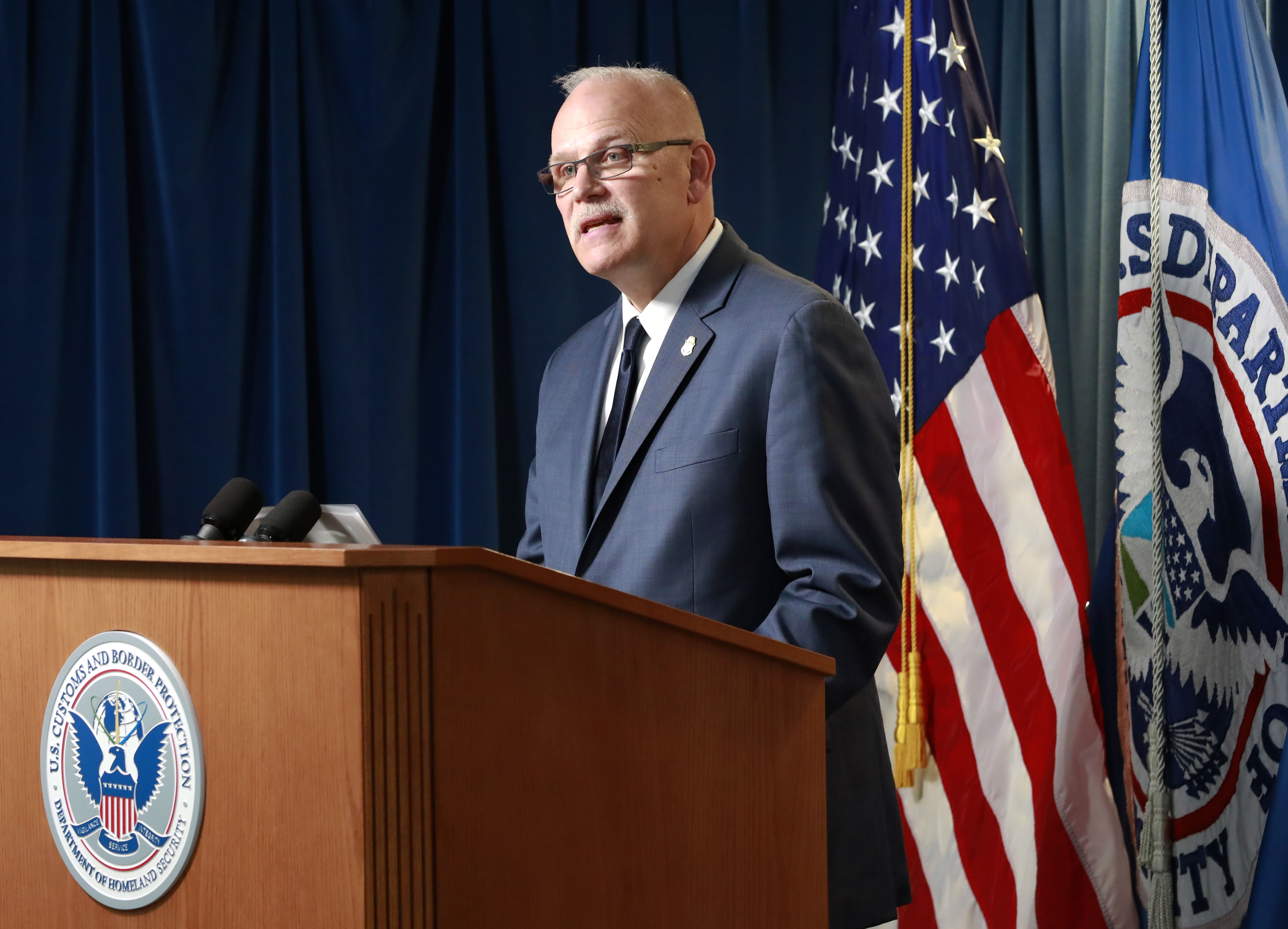
Magnus speaks as head of US Customs and Border Protection in 2022.

In April 2021, Magnus was nominated by President Joe Biden to become the commissioner of U.S. Customs and Border Protection. He was confirmed by the Senate on a 50–47 vote. He was sworn in on December 13, 2021, becoming the fifth Senate-confirmed CBP commissioner. In October 2022, officials in the Biden administration complained that Magnus was unengaged and unequipped to manage the scope of his agency. They also reported that he repeatedly missed White House meetings, neglected to make relationships with other administration officials, and failed to address the rising number of border crossings. On November 12, 2022, per the request of Secretary of Homeland Security Alejandro Mayorkas, Magnus resigned.

== Personal life ==
In 2014, Magnus married his partner of many years, Terrance Cheung, then chief of staff to Tom Butt, the mayor of Richmond; this is thought to be the first time an openly gay police chief in the United States has married.

Political offices
Preceded by Troy A. Miller; Acting	Commissioner of U.S. Customs and Border Protection; 2021–2022	Succeeded by Troy A. Miller; Acting
