= Troy Neal =

American football player

Troy Neal is a former professional American football player who played for the New York Jets of the National Football League. He attended Townsend Park High School, a segregated blacks-only school in Pine Bluff, Arkansas, and the University of Arkansas at Pine Bluff. He played for the Jets in the 1974 preseason before suffering a career-ending knee injury against the Denver Broncos.
