= Troy Hayden =

American broadcast journalist

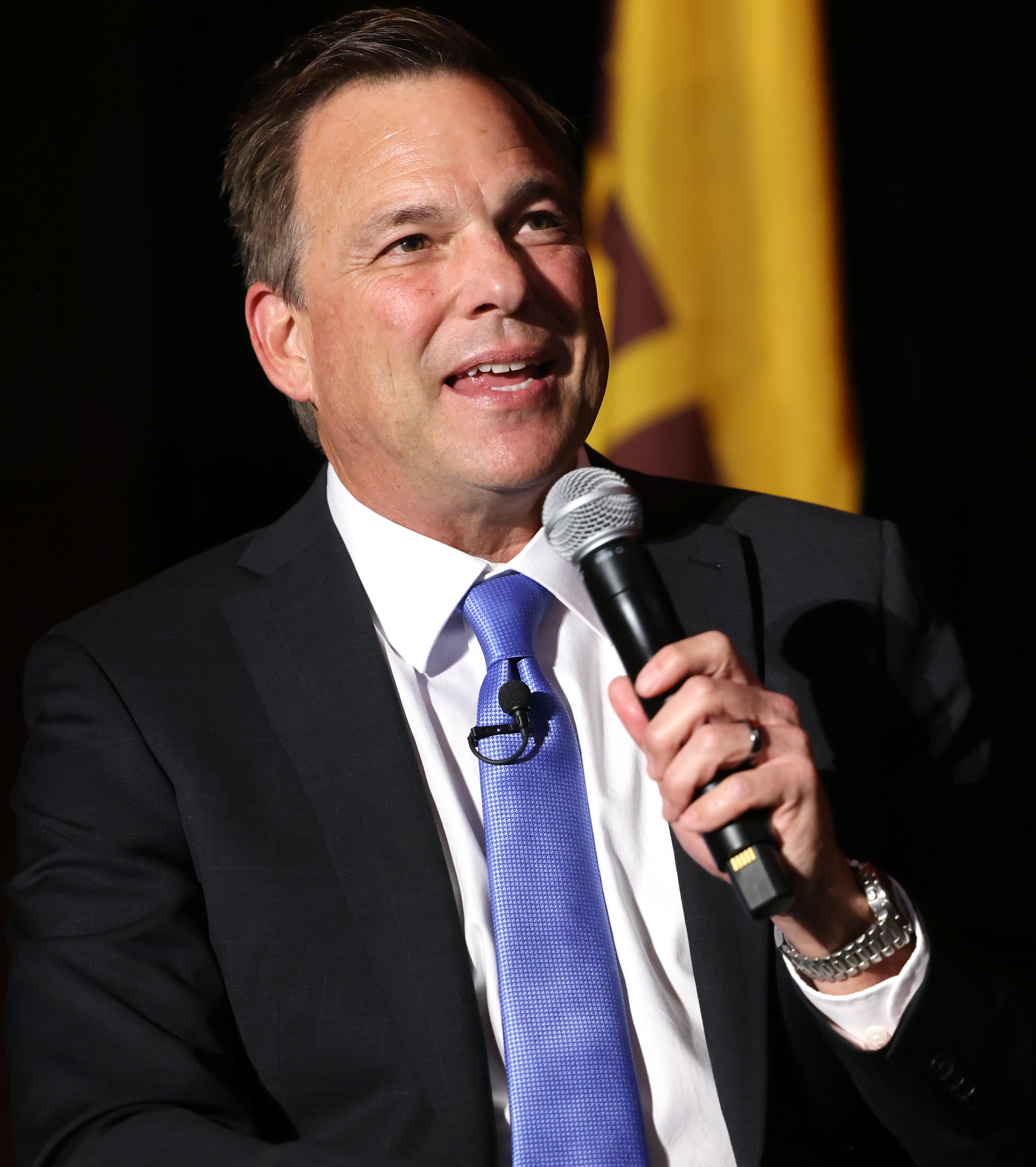
- Hayden in 2025
- Occupation: News Anchor / Field Reporter
- Employer: Channel 12 Phoenix
- Awards: Multiple Emmy Awards for reporting and anchoring

Troy Hayden is the weekday evening news anchor for 12 News on NBC affiliate KPNX-TV in Phoenix, Arizona. He started his media career as a sports writer at the Sacramento Bee, then worked in television in Sacramento, Eureka, and Reno. He graduated from Sacramento State University. He has been named Anchor of the Year by the Associated Press.
