= Troy Douglin =

English footballer

Personal information
- Full name: Troy Alexander Douglin
- Date of birth: 2 May 1982 (age 44)
- Place of birth: Coventry, England
- Position: Central defender

Youth career
- –2000: Torquay United

Senior career*
Years	Team	Apps	(Gls)
2000–2003	Torquay United	14	(0)
2000	→Celtic (loan)	0	(0)
2003–2004	Worcester City		
2004	Bromsgrove Rovers		
?–2006	Rushall Olympic		
2006–	Tipton Town	29	(7)
- * Club domestic league appearances and goals as of 1 October 2007

Troy Alexander Douglin (born 2 May 1982 in Coventry) is an English former professional footballer.

== Career ==
Douglin represented Wolverhampton Schools FA in the 1996–97 season while at school in Wednesfield.

Douglin began his career as an apprentice with Torquay United, turning professional in July 2000. He made his first team debut against Gillingham in the Football League Cup in August 2000 and after impressing in reserve games was approached by Celtic manager Martin O'Neill about going to Parkhead on trial. He joined Celtic on loan on 5 October 2000, mainly playing for their under-21 side. In March 2001, Celtic offered Torquay a deal where they would only pay for Douglin if he made the grade at Parkhead, with no initial payment. This offer was turned down and Douglin returned to Plainmoor later that month. He began the following season on a weekly contract at Plainmoor, as he weighed up his options, but signed a new two-year deal on 5 September.

He was released by Torquay in February 2003 and had a trial with Hereford United. He subsequently joined Worcester City and in February 2004 joined Bromsgrove Rovers. He played nine times for Rovers, but, despite signing a new deal, left at the start of the following season.

In the 2005–06 season, Douglin was with Rushall Olympic. He spent the 2006 close season coaching in the US at the Charlton Athletic US Soccer Academy, returning to Rushall in September 2006. He joined Tipton Town later in 2006.

== Personal life ==
In 2006 Douglin graduated from the University of Wolverhampton with a first class honors degree in Sports Science, following on with a master's degree in Physiotherapy from the University of Birmingham. He joined the Wolverhampton Wanderers medical team in 2008. He returned to the University of Wolverhampton in 2017 as Course Leader for its new Physiotherapy degree, a role he will hold alongside being a part-time physiotherapist for the Wolverhampton Wanderers academy.
