= Troy A. Miller =

American law enforcement official

Troy Miller
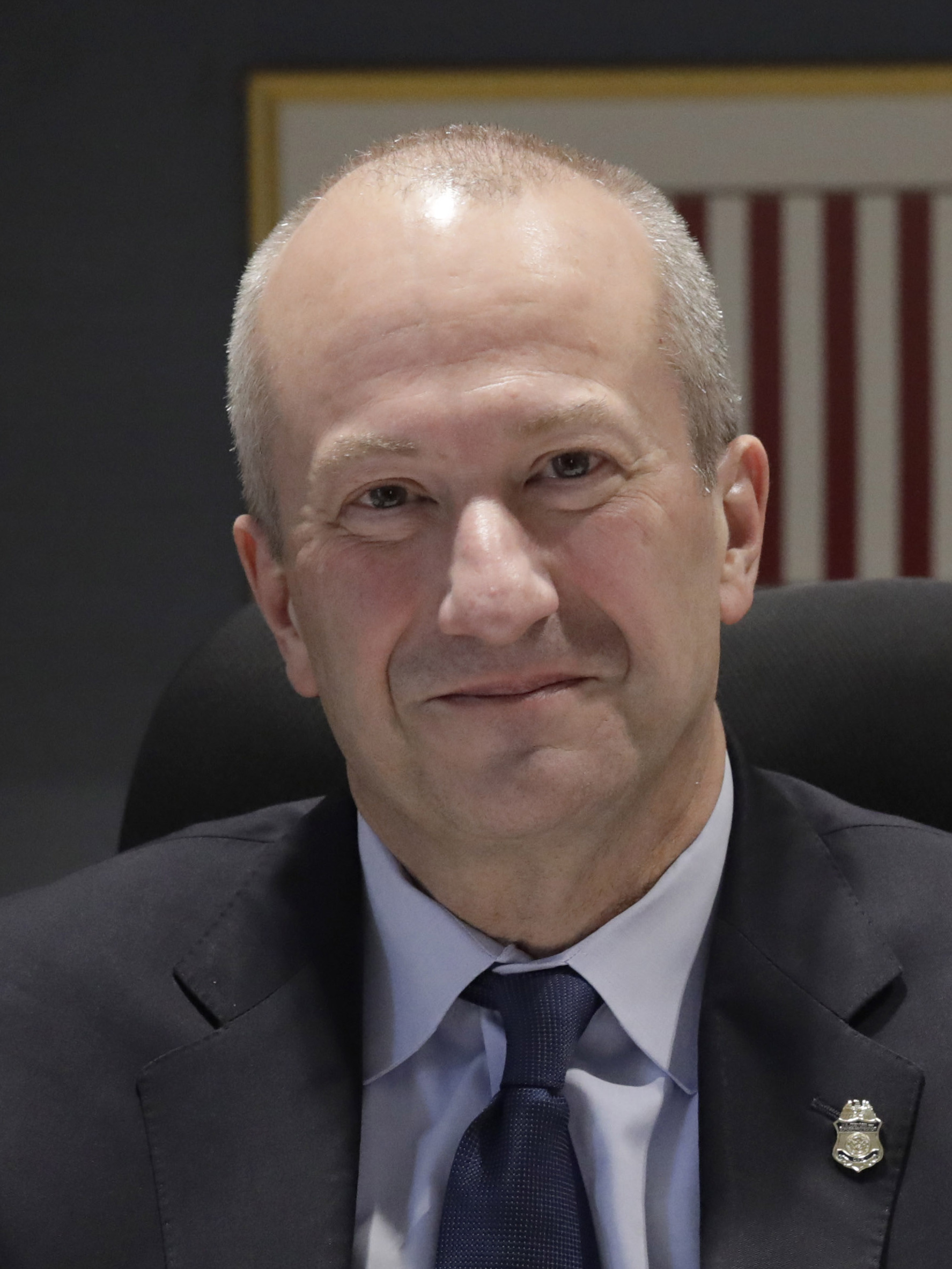
- Miller in 2024

Acting Commissioner of the United States Customs and Border Protection
- In office November 12, 2022 – January 20, 2025
- President: Joe Biden
- Deputy: Benjamine Huffman (acting)
- Preceded by: Chris Magnus
- Succeeded by: Pete R. Flores (acting)
- In office January 20, 2021 – December 13, 2021
- President: Joe Biden
- Preceded by: Mark A. Morgan (acting)
- Succeeded by: Chris Magnus

Personal details
- Education: Bemidji State University

Troy A. Miller is an American law enforcement official who served as the Acting Commissioner of the United States Customs and Border Protection from January and December 2021 and from November 2022 to January 2025. He served as the Deputy Commissioner of the United States Customs and Border Protection from December 2021 to November 2022.

== Education ==
Miller attended Bemidji State University and earned his bachelor's degree. He also attended the senior executive fellow program of Harvard University John F. Kennedy School of Government.

== Career ==
Miller joined the U.S. Customs Service as a Customs Inspector in 1993. He has held a number of leadership positions, including as assistant port director in Seattle, director of Targeting and Analysis in the Office of Intelligence and Operations Coordination and director of the National Targeting Center-Passenger.

From 2013 to 2015, Miller served as the acting assistant commissioner of the Office of Intelligence and Investigative Liaison. In that position, he testified before the House Homeland Security Subcommittee on Border and Maritime Security on the threat posed by ISIL terrorists with Western passports.

Miller then served as the executive director of the CBP's National Targeting Center, the principal organization responsible for developing and implementing CBP's counterterrorism strategy, directing over 800 employees.

Miller then served as the director of field operations for CBP's New York Field Office, directing the activities of almost 3,000 CBP employees in John F. Kennedy International Airport, Newark Liberty International Airport, and the Port of New York and New Jersey.

On January 20, 2021, Miller was appointed as acting commissioner of U.S. Customs and Border Protection in the Biden administration, succeeding Mark Morgan. On December 13, 2021, when the Senate-confirmed commissioner Chris Magnus was sworn in, he was appointed as the new deputy commissioner. Miller re-assumed the acting commissioner position upon Magnus's resignation on November 12, 2022.

== Awards ==
- Distinguished Executive Presidential Rank Award, 2016
- Meritorious Executive Presidential Rank Award, 2021

Political offices
Preceded by Mark A. Morgan; Acting	Commissioner of U.S. Customs and Border Protection; Acting; 2021	Succeeded by Chris Magnus
Preceded by Chris Magnus	Commissioner of U.S. Customs and Border Protection; Acting; 2022–2025	Succeeded by Pete R. Flores; Acting
