= National Register of Historic Places listings in Fresno County, California =

Location of Fresno County in California

This is a list of the National Register of Historic Places listings in Fresno County, California.

This is intended to be a complete list of the properties and districts on the National Register of Historic Places in Fresno County, California, United States. Latitude and longitude coordinates are provided for many National Register properties and districts; these locations may be seen together in an online map.

There are 45 properties and districts listed on the National Register in the county, including 1 National Historic Landmark.

This National Park Service list is complete through NPS recent listings posted September 4, 2026.

== Current listings ==
	Name on the Register	Image	Date listed	Location	City or town	Description
1	Azteca Theater	Azteca Theater	March 27, 2017 (#100000779)	836-840 F St. 36°43′44″N 119°47′36″W	Fresno	
2	Bank of Italy	Bank of Italy	October 29, 1982 (#82000963)	1015 Fulton Mall; 36°44′02″N 119°47′22″W	Fresno	
3	Ben Gefvert Ranch Historic District	Ben Gefvert Ranch Historic District	January 7, 2011 (#10001117)	4770 W. Whites Bridge Rd. 36°44′07″N 119°51′36″W	Fresno	
4	Big Creek Hydroelectric System Historic District	Big Creek Hydroelectric System Historic District	July 26, 2016 (#16000468)	Roughly from Big Creek to Northern Los Angeles; 37°19′23″N 119°18′58″W	Big Creek	
5	Birdwell Rock Petroglyph Site	Birdwell Rock Petroglyph Site	March 12, 2003 (#03000117)	Address Restricted	Coalinga	
6	H. H. Brix Mansion	H. H. Brix Mansion	September 15, 1983 (#83001178)	2844 Fresno St. 36°44′31″N 119°46′56″W	Fresno	
7	Coalinga Polk Street School	Coalinga Polk Street School	May 6, 1982 (#82002175)	S. 5th and E. Polk Sts. 36°08′11″N 120°21′19″W	Coalinga	1908 school listed in 1982, destroyed by earthquake in 1983.
8	Dinkey Creek Bridge	Dinkey Creek Bridge	September 5, 1996 (#96000911)	Off Dinkey Creek Rd., W of Camp Fresno, Sierra National Forest; 37°04′02″N 119°09′14″W	Dinkey Creek	
9	Einstein House	Einstein House	January 31, 1978 (#78000662)	1600 M St. 36°44′33″N 119°47′34″W	Fresno	
10	Forestiere Underground Gardens	Forestiere Underground Gardens	October 28, 1977 (#77000293)	5021 W. Shaw Ave. 36°48′26″N 119°52′51″W	Fresno	
11	Fresno Bee Building	Fresno Bee Building	November 1, 1982 (#82000964)	1555 Van Ness Ave. 36°44′25″N 119°47′41″W	Fresno	
12	Fresno Brewing Company Office and Warehouse	Fresno Brewing Company Office and Warehouse	January 5, 1984 (#84000773)	100 M St. 36°43′38″N 119°46′32″W	Fresno	
13	Fresno County Hall of Records	Fresno County Hall of Records	December 22, 2011 (#11000932)	2281 Tulare St. 36°44′10″N 119°47′14″W	Fresno	
14	Fresno Memorial Auditorium	Fresno Memorial Auditorium	May 10, 1994 (#94000427)	2425 Fresno St. 36°44′23″N 119°47′15″W	Fresno	
15	Fresno Republican Printery Building	Fresno Republican Printery Building	January 2, 1979 (#79000474)	2130 Kern St. 36°44′01″N 119°47′11″W	Fresno	
16	Fresno Sanitary Landfill	Fresno Sanitary Landfill	August 7, 2001 (#01001050)	West and Jensen Aves. 36°42′24″N 119°49′37″W	Fresno	First modern landfill in the US, this closed landfill is also a Superfund site.
17	Gamlin Cabin	Gamlin Cabin	March 8, 1977 (#77000123)	NW of Wilsonia; 36°44′56″N 118°58′13″W	Wilsonia	
18	Holy Trinity Armenian Apostolic Church	Holy Trinity Armenian Apostolic Church	July 31, 1986 (#86002097)	2226 Ventura St. 36°43′54″N 119°46′54″W	Fresno	
19	Hotel Californian	Hotel Californian	April 21, 2004 (#04000333)	851 Van Ness Ave. 36°44′03″N 119°47′17″W	Fresno	
20	Hotel Fresno	Hotel Fresno	September 13, 2018 (#100002910)	1241-1263 Broadway Plz. 36°44′09″N 119°47′38″W	Fresno	
21	M. Theo Kearney Park and Mansion	M. Theo Kearney Park and Mansion	March 13, 1975 (#75000426)	7160 W. Kearney Blvd. 36°43′32″N 119°55′04″W	Fresno	
22	Paul Kindler House	Paul Kindler House	October 29, 1982 (#82000965)	1520 E. Olive Ave. 36°45′26″N 119°47′27″W	Fresno	
23	Knapp Cabin	Knapp Cabin	December 20, 1978 (#78000291)	W of Cedar Grove in Kings Canyon National Park; 36°47′02″N 118°38′09″W	Cedar Grove	
24	Maubridge Apartments	Maubridge Apartments	May 6, 1982 (#82002176)	2344 Tulare St. 36°44′12″N 119°47′07″W	Fresno	
25	Meux House	Meux House	January 13, 1975 (#75000427)	1007 R St. 36°44′23″N 119°46′53″W	Fresno	
26	John Muir Memorial Shelter	John Muir Memorial Shelter	August 15, 2016 (#16000576)	At the top of Muir Pass in Kings Canyon National Park; 37°06′43″N 118°40′15″W	Grant Cove	
27	Old Administration Building, Fresno City College	Old Administration Building, Fresno City College	May 1, 1974 (#74000510)	1101 E. University Ave. 36°46′04″N 119°47′51″W	Fresno	
28	Old Fresno Water Tower	Old Fresno Water Tower	October 14, 1971 (#71000139)	2444 Fresno St. 36°44′21″N 119°47′11″W	Fresno	
29	Orange Cove Santa Fe Railway Depot	Orange Cove Santa Fe Railway Depot	August 29, 1978 (#78000668)	633 E. Railroad Ave. 36°37′23″N 119°18′42″W	Orange Cove	
30	Alexander Pantages Theater	Alexander Pantages Theater	February 23, 1978 (#78000663)	1400 Fulton St. 36°44′17″N 119°47′40″W	Fresno	
31	Physicians Building	Physicians Building	November 20, 1978 (#78000664)	2607 Fresno St. 36°44′26″N 119°47′06″W	Fresno	
32	Reedley National Bank	Reedley National Bank	February 28, 1985 (#85000352)	1100 G St. 36°35′47″N 119°26′58″W	Reedley	
33	Reedley Opera House Complex	Reedley Opera House Complex	April 5, 1984 (#84000774)	10th and G Sts. 36°35′49″N 119°27′03″W	Reedley	
34	Rehorn House	Rehorn House	January 8, 1982 (#82002177)	1050 S St. 36°44′29″N 119°46′50″W	Fresno	Destroyed by fire February 1, 2016
35	Frank Romain House	Frank Romain House	January 11, 1982 (#82002178)	2055 San Joaquin St. 36°44′30″N 119°47′46″W	Fresno	
36	San Joaquin Light & Power Corporation Building	San Joaquin Light & Power Corporation Building	January 3, 2006 (#05001497)	1401 Fulton St. 36°44′13″N 119°47′41″W	Fresno	
37	Santa Fe Hotel	Santa Fe Hotel	March 14, 1991 (#91000287)	935 Santa Fe Ave. 36°44′16″N 119°46′56″W	Fresno	
38	Santa Fe Passenger Depot	Santa Fe Passenger Depot	November 7, 1976 (#76000482)	2650 Tulare St. 36°44′18″N 119°46′55″W	Fresno	
39	Shorty Lovelace Historic District	Shorty Lovelace Historic District	January 31, 1978 (#78000293)	E of Pinehurst in Kings Canyon National Park; 36°44′26″N 118°31′03″W	Pinehurst	A series of cabins built by trapper Shorty Lovelace.
40	Southern Pacific Passenger Depot	Southern Pacific Passenger Depot	March 21, 1978 (#78000665)	1033 H St. 36°43′57″N 119°47′33″W	Fresno	
41	Stoner House		October 17, 1985 (#85003145)	21143 E. Weldon Ave. 36°45′53″N 119°24′31″W	Sanger	Craftsman bungalow mansion built on a hilltop in 1910.
42	Tower Theatre	Tower Theatre	September 24, 1992 (#92001276)	1201 N. Wishon Ave. 36°45′28″N 119°48′05″W	Fresno	
43	Twining Laboratories	Twining Laboratories	March 26, 1991 (#91000308)	2527 Fresno St. 36°45′29″N 119°47′12″W	Fresno	
44	Warehouse Row	Warehouse Row	March 24, 1978 (#78000666)	722, 744, and 764 P St. 36°44′10″N 119°46′40″W	Fresno	
45	Y.W.C.A. Building	Y.W.C.A. Building	September 21, 1978 (#78000667)	1660 M St. 36°44′35″N 119°47′35″W	Fresno	

== See also ==
- List of National Historic Landmarks in California
- National Register of Historic Places listings in California
- California Historical Landmarks in Fresno County, California
