= Einstein House (Fresno, California) =

Historic house and women's building in Fresno, California

- U.S. National Register of Historic Places
- Location within California Location within the United States
- Location: 1600 M Street; Fresno, California 93721
- Coordinates: 36°44′33″N 119°47′37″W
- Area: less than one acre
- Built: 1912
- Architect: Edward T. Foulkes
- Architectural style: English Arts and Crafts
- NRHP reference No.: 78000662
- Added to NRHP: January 31, 1978

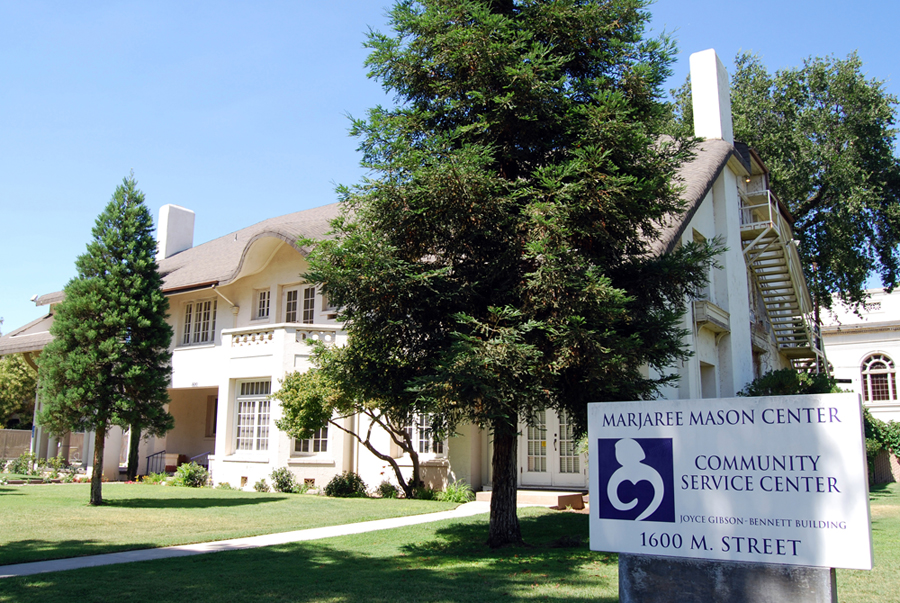

The Einstein House is a historic home in Fresno, California listed on the National Register of Historic Places. Architect Edward T. Foulkes designed the house, later known as the YWCA Activity Unit and the Joyce Gibson-Bennett Building.

== History ==
The English Arts and Crafts was completed 1912 for prominent merchant and banker Louis Einstein. He died in 1914 but his widow, Eda Einstein lived in the house until she died. In 1950, the YWCA of Fresno bought the house to serve as an activity center for the adjacent YWCA Building.

In 1979, the YWCA opened the Marjaree Mason Center in both buildings to focus on serving victims of domestic violence. In 1998, the group disaffiliated from the national Y to become an independent agency.

The house became the group's headquarters and renamed to the Joyce Gibson-Bennett Building to honor a local attorney who supported the center. In 2025, the center moved to a newer and larger facility, the Isnardi Foundation Building.

== Architecture ==
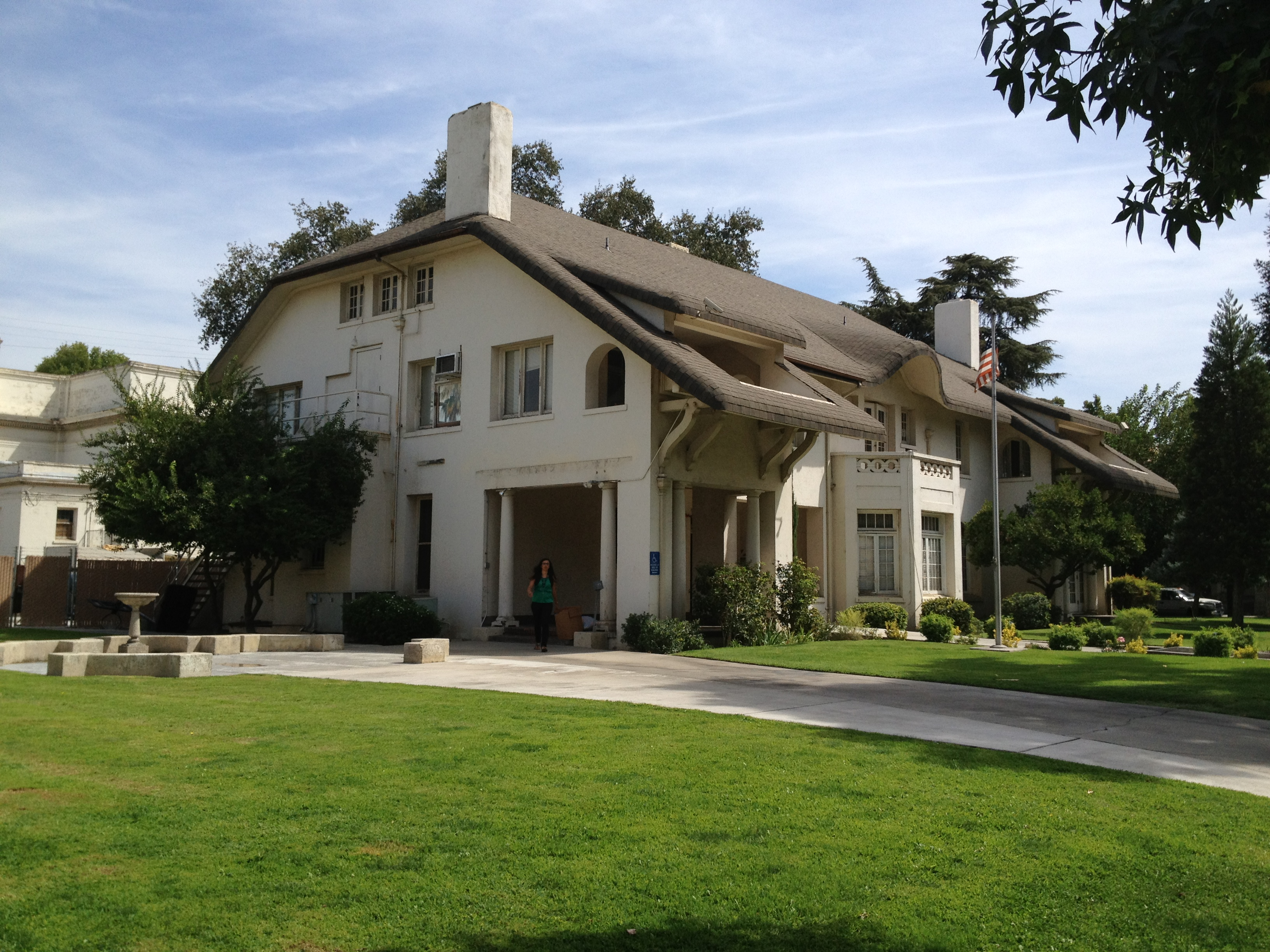
Side veranda with Doric columns

The English Arts and Crafts architecture provides a cottage design. The exterior of the building consists of plaster applied over brick with a rounded roof. An elaborate bay window which in turn supports a balcony on the second floor dominates the front of the building. An upward curvature of the roofline accentuates this feature. To the left is a small veranda with Doric columns supporting an open porch on the second floor.

Inside, the brick fireplace in the living room continues the style with an entablature supported by Doric columns. Unusually, the basement contains both the summer living room along with a game room to escape the hot San Joaquin Valley.

== See also ==
- List of YWCA buildings
- National Register of Historic Places listings in Fresno County, California
