= Blackie Gejeian =

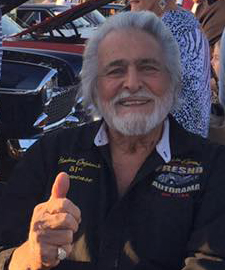
- Gejeian in 2015
- Born: Michael Gejeian; June 24, 1926; Easton, California, U.S.
- Died: September 2, 2016 (aged 90); Fresno, California, U.S.
- Known for: Hot rod art, automobile customizing
- Notable work: Shish Kebob (formerly Blackie); Ala Kart; California Star
- Movement: Kustom Kulture

Michael "Blackie" Gejeian (June 24, 1926 – September 2, 2016) was an American race car driver, race car builder, and hot rod enthusiast. Considered an "Industry Legend", Gejeian was the organizer of the Autorama, one of the largest custom car shows in North America, held annually in Fresno, California.

== Life and career ==
Michael "Blackie" Gejeian, an Armenian by descent, was born on June 24, 1926 in Easton, California, near Fresno, to a family of Armenian genocide survivors. His family, including his extended family, were farmers who lived together in one farm ranch. Gejeian later recalled:

Seventeen of us lived in that one farm house. And you've never seen such happy people. My dad played the violin. One uncle the clarinet. Another uncle the tambourine. At nights they would play, and my mother and aunts would dance in a circle, the old Armenian dances, holding hands.

Gejeian then started to drive his dads car at the age of 12 around the ranch. After Gejeian graduated high school, he enlisted in the United States Navy and participated in World War II. Returning from the war, Gejeian desired to build the fastest hot rod in Fresno. His first car was built in 1945 and became the fastest in Fresno. Painted in black, he called this first car "Blackie", which would ultimately earn him his nickname. However, this car would ultimately crash in a race in 1948. Gejeian rebuilt the roadster as a show car and renamed it "Shish Kebob". The car's undercarriage was the first to be entirely chrome-plated. He also started the tradition of placing a mirror beneath the car when showcased. The car earned the title "Best of Show" at Gene Winfield's show. In 1955, it was named World's Most Beautiful Roadster by the Oakland Grand National Roadster Show.

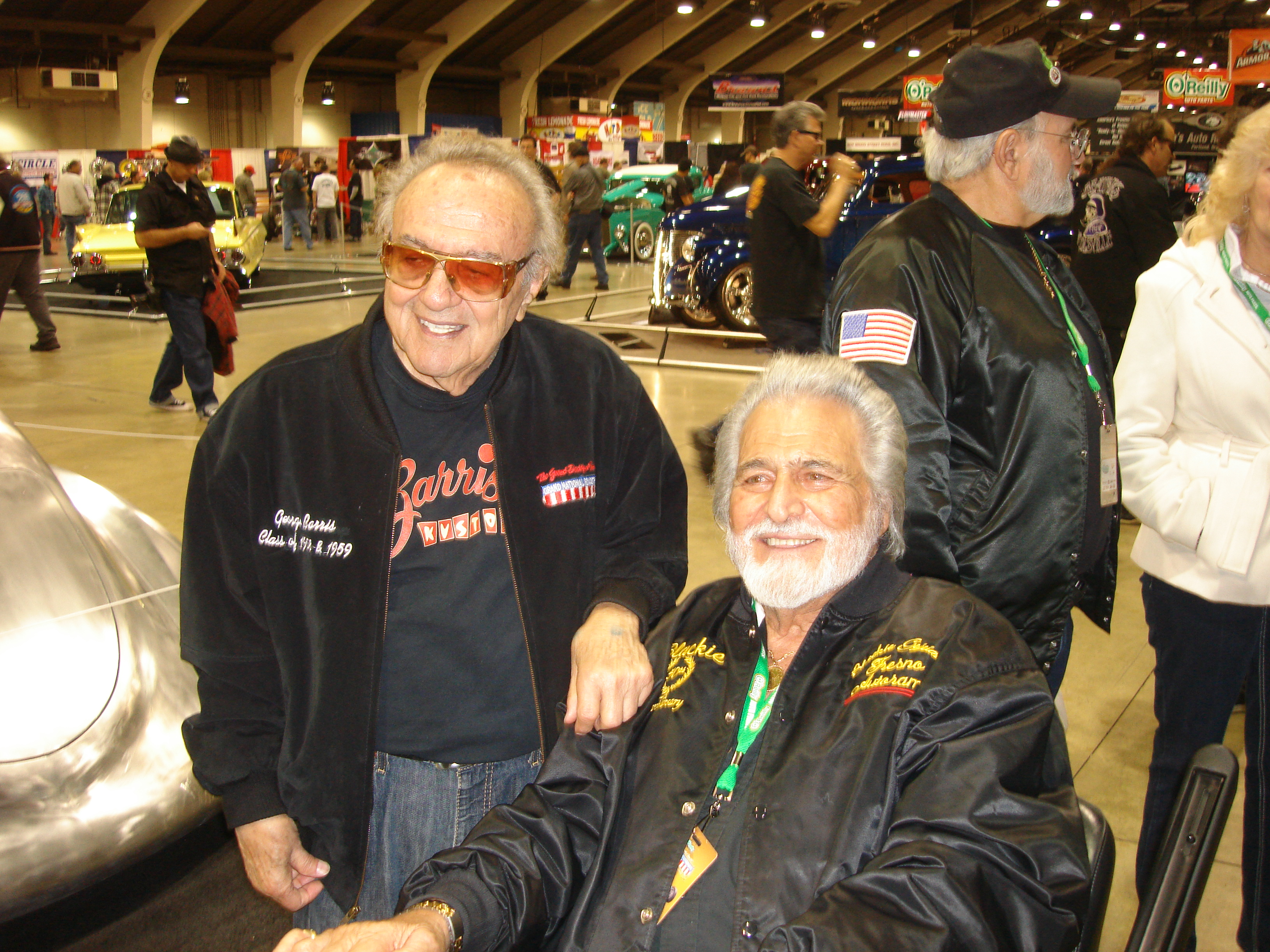
George Barris (left) with Mike "Blackie" Gejeian at the 64th Grand National Roadster Show in Los Angeles

Blackie Gejeian, along with George Barris, Richard Peters, then built the Ala Kart. The chassis work was done Peters and Gejeian at their Fresno, California shop, while the body and styling was by Barris. The Ala Kart won more than 200 trophies and became America's most beautiful roadster twice in 1958 and again in 1959. The name was derived from George Barris, an auto customizer, opening a menu and Blackie seeing the phrase Ala Carte on the top of it. Barris sketched out the early design on restaurant napkins. Ala Kart featured an entirely chromed chassis, including springs, driveshaft, and rearend (following Gejean's previous car's example). Ala Kart was reproduced as a 1/25 scale model kit by AMT in 1961 becoming one of the best-selling kits in history. It was also reproduced by the Danbury Mint, reissued four times due to demand, plus a Fiftieth Anniversary edition. In addition, it was issued as a Hot Wheels car. Ala Kart also made numerous film appearances, usually in the background of drive-in shots, before its importance to rodders and customizers was recognized.

Blackie Gejeian became a NASCAR dirt track champion five times.

He became of promoter at Clovis speedway for over two decades from 1960 to 1980. The Clovis speedway, which was in a dire situation, became more and more popular with Gejeian's promotion. Through Gejeian's effort, the Clovis speedway became "most epic dirt tracks in the country." Gejeian was also the owner of the Fresno Dragway 18 years.

A plaque was inaugurated in 2009 which honors Blackie Gejeian outside of the Fresno Convention Center. He died on September 2, 2016, at the age of 90.

== Autorama ==
Blackie Gejeian began the Autorama car show in 1958, after which the show was held annually for 52 years in Fresno, California. The Autorama "drew some of the finest examples of automotive ingenuity." In its 50th anniversary in 2008, the Autorama showcased over 250 cars. However, with the retirement of Gejeian, the Autorama car show ceased from occurring. Throughout its history, the Autorama car show took place once a year for 51 years, the last show being held in 2010.
