= Fresno Metropolitan Museum of Art and Science =

Former museum in California, United States

Fresno Metropolitan Museum
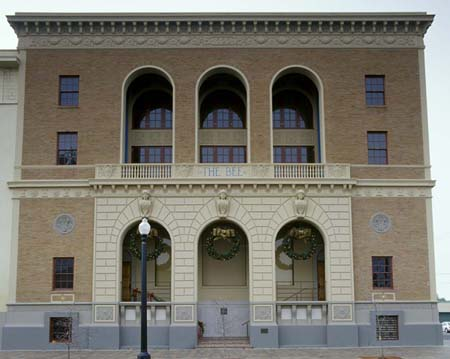
- Established: April 8, 1984
- Dissolved: January 5, 2010
- Location: Fresno, California
- Director: Dana Thorpe

The Fresno Metropolitan Museum of Art and Science was a Smithsonian Institution Affiliate and American Alliance of Museums accredited museum located in downtown Fresno, California, in the San Joaquin Valley. The Museum was established in 1984 and was one of the largest museums between San Francisco and Los Angeles. "The Met" was housed in the historic 1922 Fresno Bee Building.

In August 2005, the museum began an extensive interior renovation; the first of its kind since the Museum's opening. The museum reopened on November 13, 2008, and closed on January 5, 2010, after defaulting on its renovation loans.

== History ==
In 1978, a group of Fresno civic leaders began to explore the possibility of creating a regional museum for the San Joaquin Valley. From 1981 to 1985, these members of the community raised more than $5.5 million to open the Met in the historic downtown Fresno Bee building. The Museum opened its doors to the community on April 8, 1984.

Since that time, the Museum has attracted more than two million people with its programs in art and science with diverse exhibitions including A T. rex Named Sue, Masterworks from the Albertina, Georgia O'Keeffe: Visions of the Sublime, Variations on a Theme: American Prints from Pop Art to Minimalism and Grossology: The (Impolite) Science of the Human Body.

In 1995, the Museum became the first organization outside the Bay Area to win Northern California's "Award for Excellence" in non-profit management from Chevron and The Management Center of San Francisco. In 1995, the Met received a Central California Excellence in Business Award in the non-profit category as presented by The Fresno Bee, and American Alliance of Museums accreditation status in July 2007. The Museum was named the Best Museum each year since 1999 by the readers of The Fresno Bee.

On January 5, 2010, the Museum closed for good, due to the museum's inability to pay off the increasing deficit from the museum's renovation and operations.

== Renovation ==
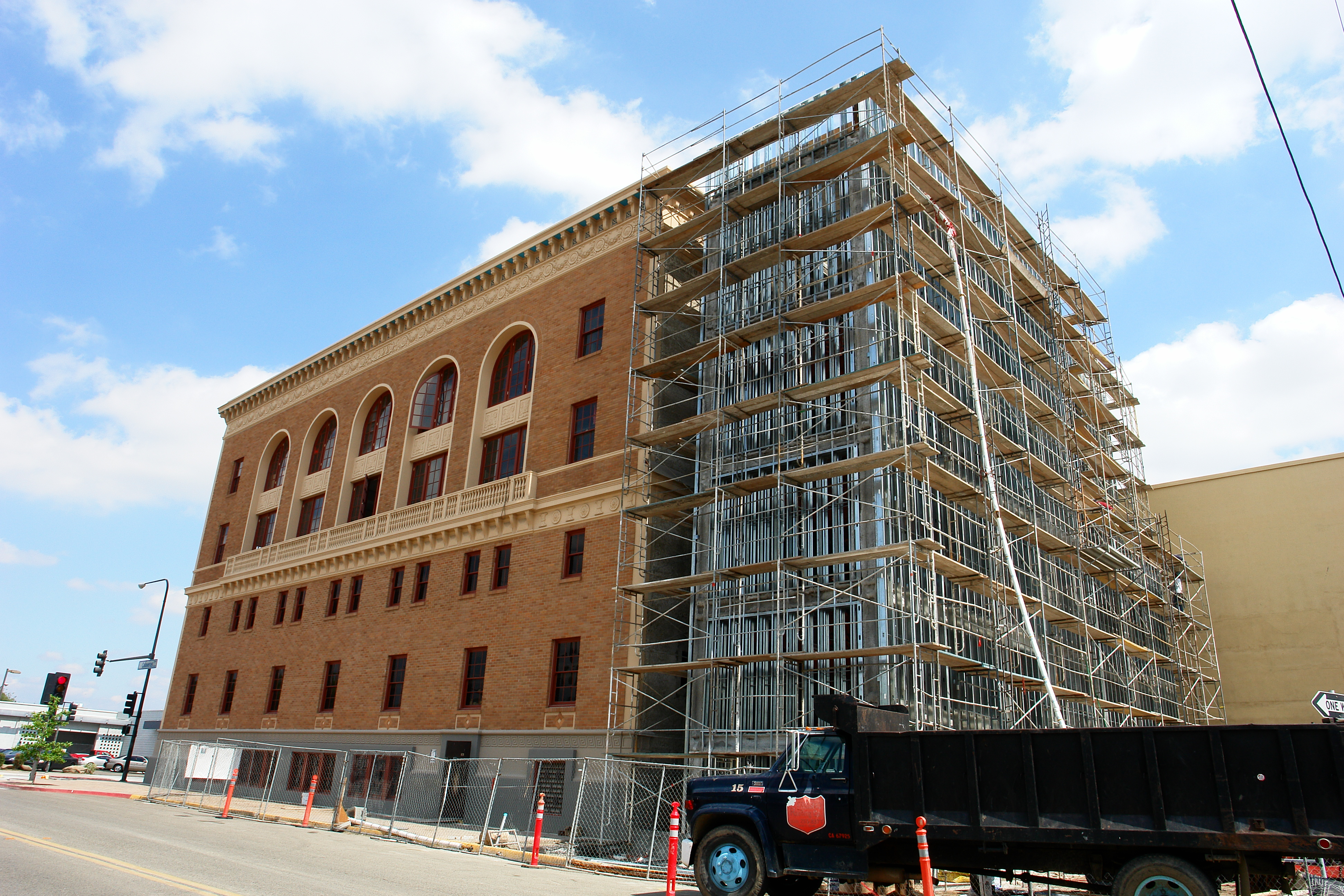
The Fresno Metropolitan Museum under renovation, May 2007

The museum's $28 million renovation project brought the historic 1922 Fresno Bee Building into the 21st century, with more accessible gallery space, new restroom facilities and elevators, and remodeled fourth and fifth floors, which previously had not been opened as gallery space. The building underwent significant structural enhancements, specifically on the west wall from the footings below the basement up to the fifth floor. The existing support columns consisting of steel reinforced concrete were enhanced in the basement and first floor. The building reopened November 13, 2008.

The museum's fourth floor consisted of a large gallery space that also served as a forum for educational purposes and housed the Michaelis Classroom in an adjacent room. The fifth floor became the home for the museum's administrative offices and also housed a conference room and research library.

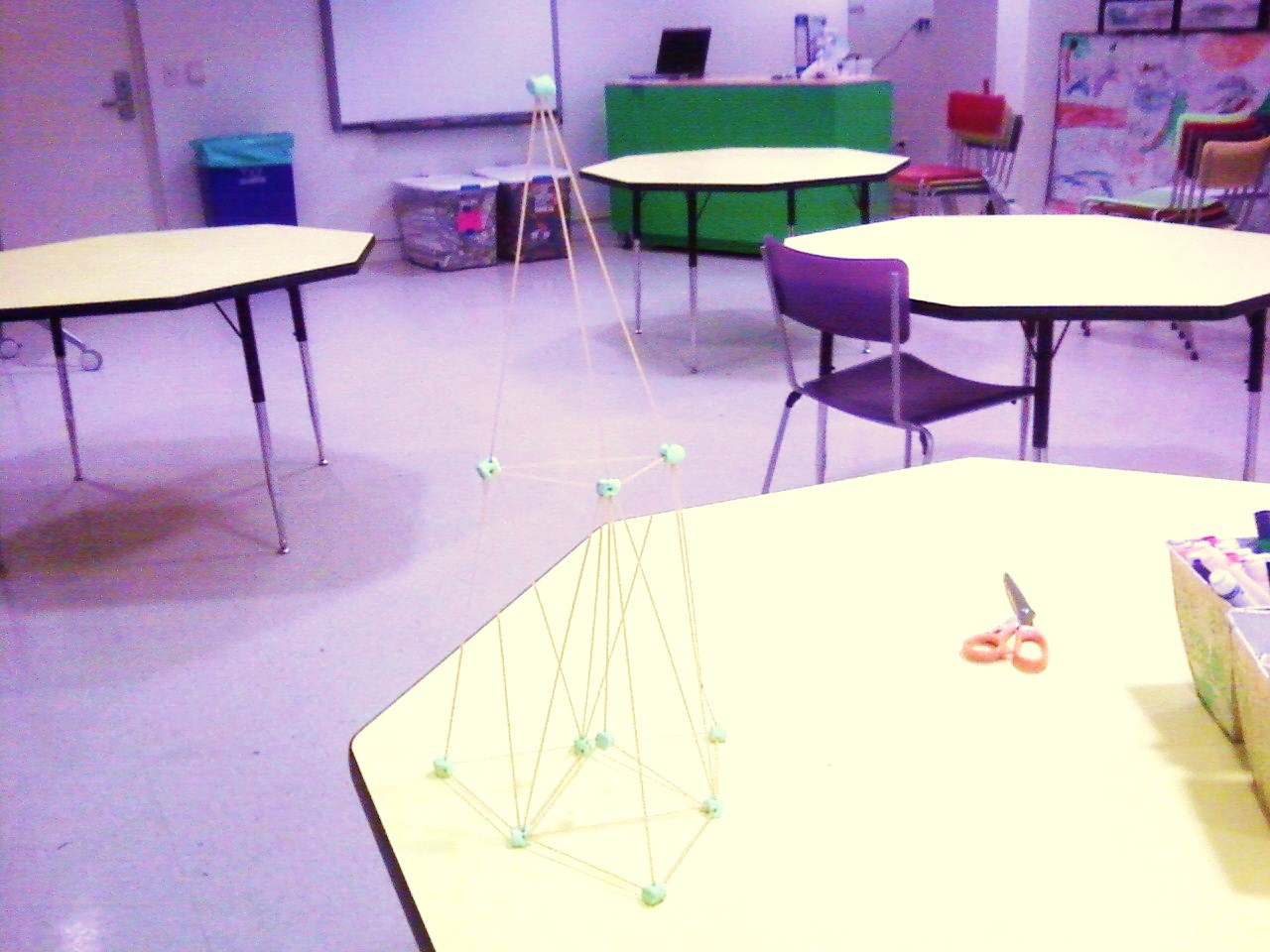
A model pyramid in the Michaelis Classroom.

== Temporary space/Reeves Family ASK Science Center ==
During the museum's renovation, programming and exhibitions were held in a temporary location. The museum's Reeves Family ASK Science Center moved into donated space in the fall of 2005 and was open until July 2008.

The Reeves Family ASK Science Center was a hands-on science education space that featured rotating exhibits. Following the renovation the center returned to its location inside the museum.

== Educational and community outreach ==
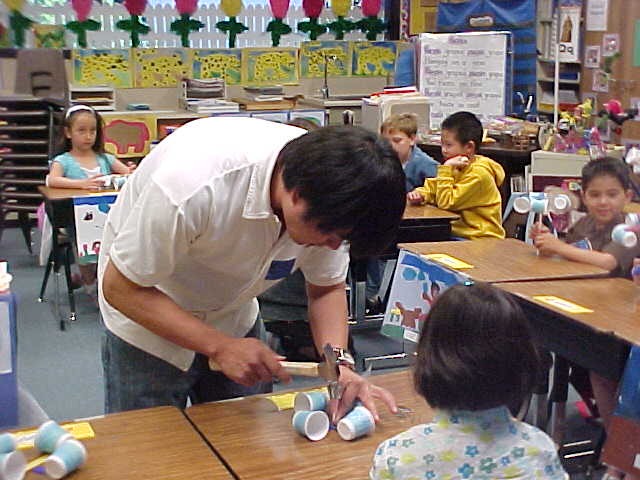
The Met's Science Outreach program visits the classroom

The museum's outreach efforts included:

The Mobile Met Science Outreach program, which visited schools, YMCA groups, day care facilities and summer school programs from Los Baños to Visalia and provided free hands-on science lessons inspired by the California Science Standards for children in kindergarten though sixth grade.

The Docent Outreach Project which allowed teachers in grades 1 through 3 to take advantage of the Met's programming without traveling to the museum. The program's lessons were one hour long and featured hands-on art instruction.

Visual Thinking Strategies (VTS), which used art to teach critical thinking, communication skills and visual literacy. These lessons were provided in English, Spanish and Hmong, free of charge to schools.

The Met on the Move program, which debuted on October 13, 2008, included its mobile outreach vehicle, the Met on the Move, which provided hands-on activities and lessons in art and science to elementary schools in and around the Central San Joaquin Valley. The Met on the Move was the latest addition to the City of Fresno's Department of Parks After School, Recreation & Community Services Mobile Fleet.

== CMAC ==
Following the closure of the museum, the city of Fresno took possession of the property. After standing vacant for two years, a new public access station, Community Media Access Collaborative moved into the second floor of the building in April, 2012. As part of their public access mission, they continue to show art from local artists. The other floors remain unoccupied.
