= Dinkey Creek Bridge =

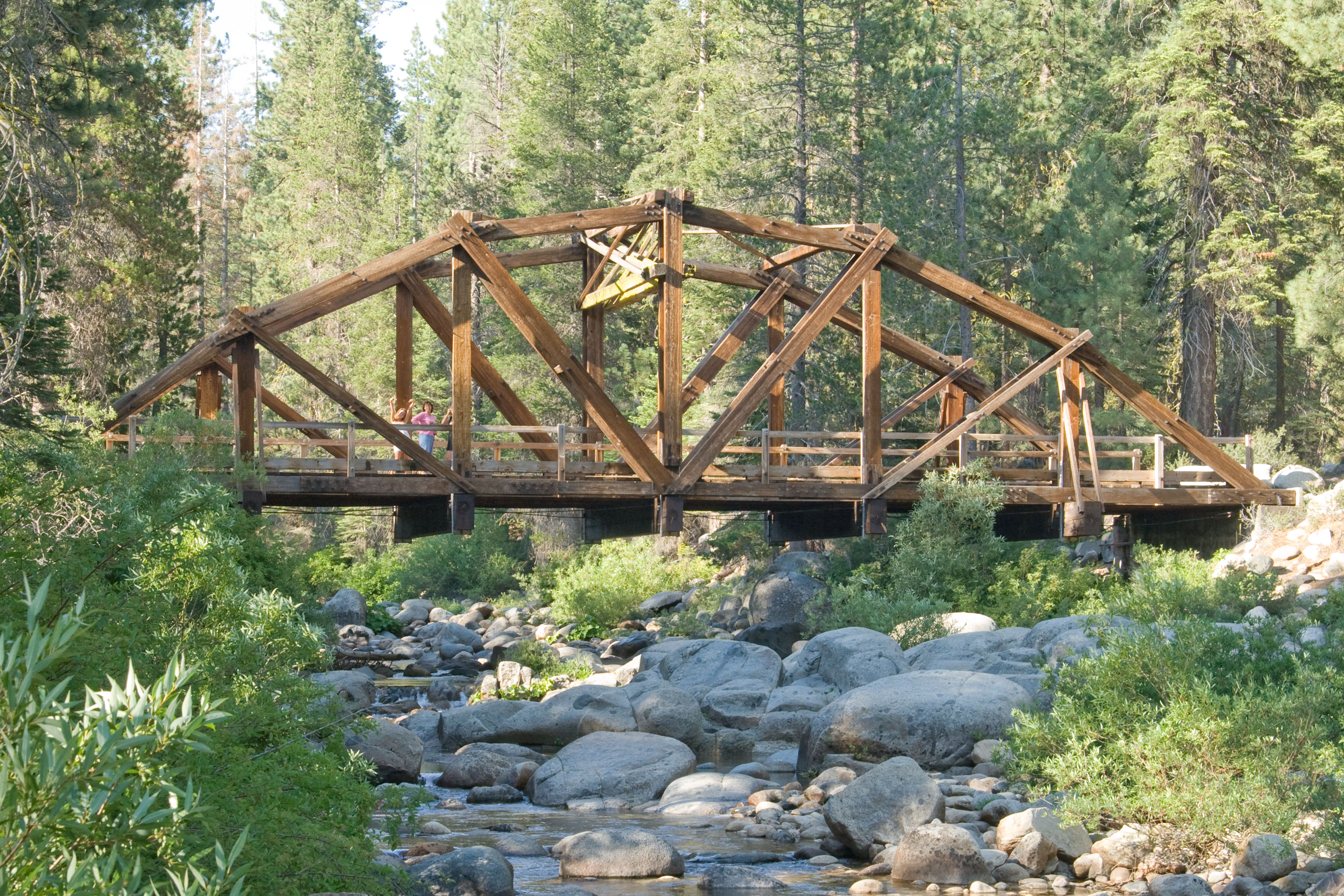
- Bridge in 2008
- Coordinates: 37.0672°N 119.1539°W
- Crosses: Dinkey Creek
- Locale: Off Dinkey Creek Rd. Sierra National Forest; Fresno County, California

Characteristics
- Longest span: 90 feet (27 m)

History
- Designer: T.K. May
- Construction end: 1938
- Closed: 1965 (to automobiles)
- Dinkey Creek Bridge
- U.S. National Register of Historic Places
- NRHP reference No.: 96000911
- Added to NRHP: September 5, 1996

Location
- Interactive map of Dinkey Creek Bridge

The Dinkey Creek Bridge, also known as Fresno County Bridge No. 42C-04, (Note: Designated by Caltrans) is a single-span, timber bowstring arch truss bridge that crosses Dinkey Creek in Fresno County, California, within Sierra National Forest. Built in 1938, it closed to automobile traffic in 1965 and was renovated in 1988 to replace rotting timbers. Designed by T.K. May, it was built by the U.S. Forest Service with Civilian Conservation Corps (CCC) labor. The structure was listed on the National Register of Historic Places in 1996.

== History ==
The construction of the Dinkey Creek Bridge was part of a wider effort to improve access to recreation and timber resources in the area. The bridge was designed by engineer T.K. "Tank" May. The concrete abutments were designed by the Fresno County Surveyor in June 1938, and construction on the bridge completed that year. (Note: The NRHP nomination form indicates that records exist for construction years of 1934 and 1938. Original plans for the concrete abutments are dated June 1938, so that is the most likely year of construction.) Designed as a highway bridge to carry McKinley Grove Road, it was built by the U.S. Forest Service with Civilian Conservation Corps labor. The Colletti Construction Company of San Rafael cut the timber and test assembled it, before disassembling it and shipping it to the site to be erected by a CCC crew.

The name "Dinkey" comes from a dog by that name, which is applied to the bridge, creek, lake, meadow, and nearby mountain. Two stories of the origin of the name are noted, in which the dog was either injured or killed in an altercation with a bear, after which the area was named "Dinkey".

In 1956, a new steel bridge was built about 0.35 miles (0.56 km) downstream. In 1965, the Dinkey Creek Bridge closed to automobile traffic because of wood rot; it has served as a pedestrian bridge since then. By 1988, the rot was becoming significant, so the untreated decking, wheel guards, railings, and longitudinal stringers were replaced with preservative-treated components of the same dimensions and material. The renovation also included the construction of a concrete wall in the creek upstream of the west abutment to resist erosion. The bridge was nominated for inclusion in National Register of Historic Places under Criterion C for its engineering significance; it was listed on September 5, 1996.

On April 13, 2023 the City of Fresno, which runs the adjacent Camp Fresno, reported the bridge has collapsed after a heavy snow season.

== Design and location ==
The bridge is within the Sierra National Forest at about 5,680 feet (1,730 m) above sea level. It spans Dinkey Creek in a wooded valley about 42 miles (68 km) east of Fresno, California. The bridge's single span is 90 feet (27 m) long and the roadway is 20 feet (6.1 m) wide. The bridge has a Pratt truss arrangement, with the diagonal members angling inwards. The structure's bowstring-arch design, while relatively common in roof trusses, is rare in bridges. May believed it to be the only such bridge in California at the time of its construction, and a Caltrans inventory of potentially historic bridges, completed in 1987, found no such structures.

The abutments are made of unreinforced Portland cement concrete in the Cyclopean style. As wet cement was poured in the form, cobblestones were added by hand; the technique was common when cement was relatively expensive compared to labor. The bridge itself was built of Douglas fir, with the truss treated with creosote preservative and the deck left untreated. The structure was designed for assembly by unskilled workmen with hand tools to take advantage of nearby CCC labor. A model of the bridge was made by May for display at the U.S. Forestry Laboratory in Richmond, California, at the request of the West Coast Lumberman's Association, because of its unique design.

== See also ==
- National Register of Historic Places listings in Fresno County, California
