= Fresno Republican Printery Building =

- U.S. National Register of Historic Places
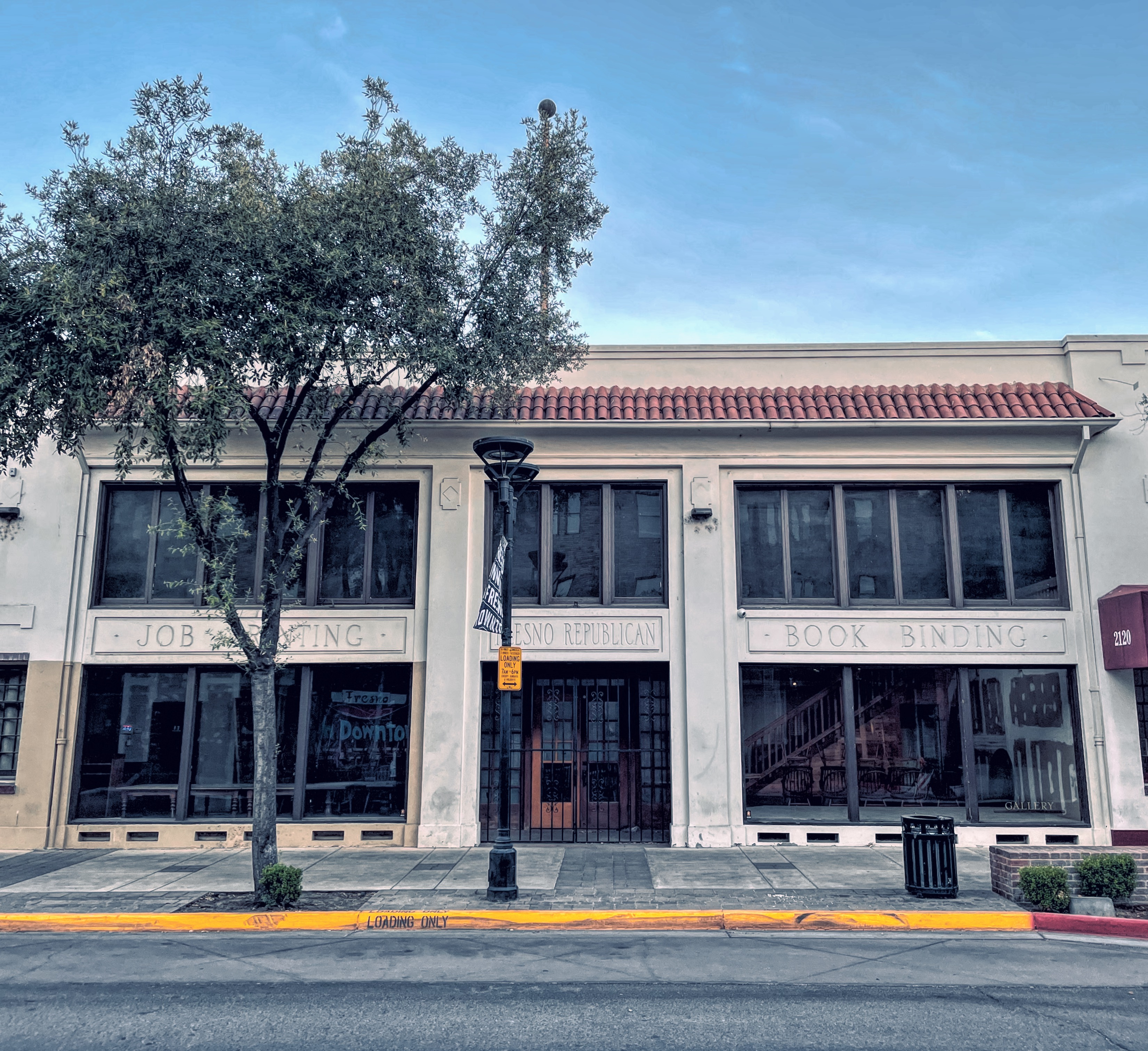

- Location within California
- Location: 2130 Kern St., Fresno, California
- Coordinates: 36°44′01″N 119°47′11″W
- Area: less than one acre
- Built: 1919
- Architect: Edward Francis Glass; Charles Butner
- NRHP reference No.: 79000474
- Added to NRHP: January 2, 1979

The Fresno Republican Printery Building, at 2130 Kern St. in Fresno, California, was built in 1919 to publish the Fresno Morning Republican. It was listed on the National Register of Historic Places in 1979.

It was designed by architects Glass and Butner.

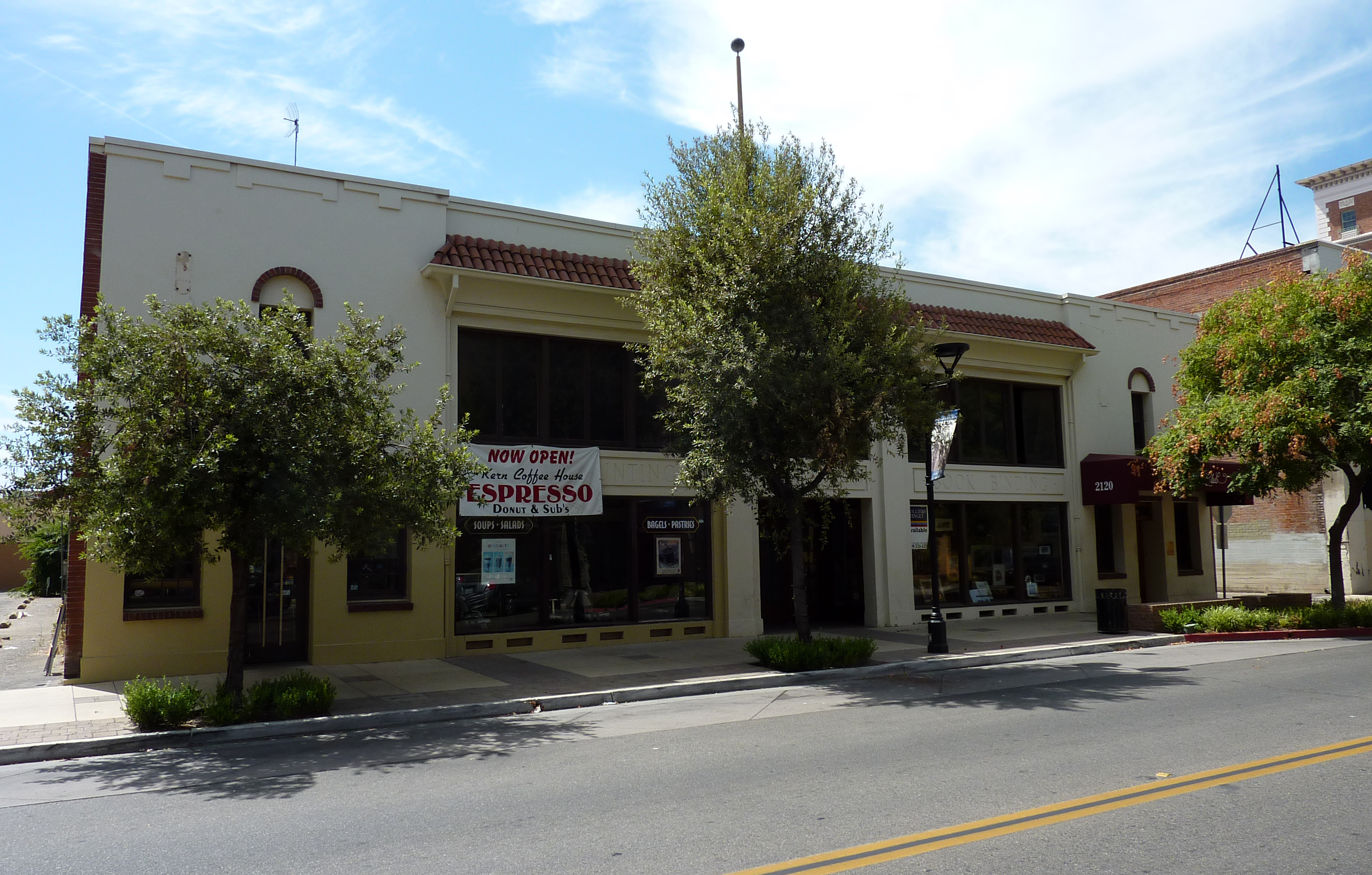
Fresno Republican Printery Building in 2009

Its National Register nomination states:

"Architecturally, The Fresno Republican Printery Building (1919) is a sophisticated interpretation of the mezzo-mediterranean styles which evolved during California's regional and rather eclectic architectural revival era (1915-1930). Glass and Butner's decidedly refined and personalized transcription of classically defined details, fused with less strict revival forms, produced an elegantly symmetrical commercial facade, which continues to grace the downtown community with its quiet dignity. The rare survival of this building, with its original appearance and function almost entirely intact, has not come about by accident. The historical owners, William Camy and Elaine Camy Barber, have repeatedly avoided selling this remarkable property to insensitive developers, whose interests have generally embraced demolition for expansion of commercial parking ventures. It is, herefore, with a profound sense of responsibility, desirable for The Fresno Republican Printery Building to be recognized as one of the more architecturally eloquent statements in the city center, and as such to be assisted along its way to a careful restoration for a dynamically new, yet historically sensitive use."

== See also ==
- Fresno Bee Building
- National Register of Historic Places listings in Fresno County, California
