= California Historical Landmarks in Fresno County =

List table of the properties and districts listed as California Historical Landmarks within Fresno County, Northern California.

- Note: Click the "Map of all coordinates" link to the right to view a Google map of all properties and districts with latitude and longitude coordinates in the table below.

== Listings ==
Image		Landmark name	Location	City or town	Summary
Arroyo de Cantúa	344	Arroyo de Cantúa	Dorris Ave. & State Hwy 33; 36°14′47″N 120°18′53″W	Coalinga	
Forestiere Underground Gardens	916	Forestiere Underground Gardens	5021 W. Shaw Ave. 36°48′26″N 119°52′51″W	Fresno	Also on the NRHP list as NPS-77000293
Fort Miller	584	Fort Miller	Millerton Lake State Recreation Area; 37°00′55″N 119°39′34″W	Friant	
Upload Photo	488	Fresno City	Fresno Slough; 36°39′40″N 120°15′40″W	Tranquillity	
Site of the Fresno Free Speech Fight of the Industrial Workers of the World	873	Site of the Fresno Free Speech Fight of the Industrial Workers of the World	Mariposa Street and Congo Alley in the Fulton Mall (Fresno); 36°44′04″N 119°47′30″W	Fresno	
Upload Photo	803	Site of the first junior college in California	Stanislaus St. & O St. 36°44′32″N 119°47′23″W	Fresno	
Temporary Detention Camps for Japanese Americans - Fresno Assembly Center	934	Temporary Detention Camps for Japanese Americans - Fresno Assembly Center	Big Fresno Fairgrounds; 36°43′53″N 119°45′03″W	Fresno	
Temporary Detention Camps for Japanese Americans - Pinedale Assembly Center	934	Temporary Detention Camps for Japanese Americans - Pinedale Assembly Center	625 W. Alluvial Ave. 36°50′40″N 119°48′15″W	Pinedale	

== See also ==
- List of California Historical Landmarks
- National Register of Historic Places listings in Fresno County, California
