= Glass and Butner =

American architect

Glass and Butner was an architectural partnership of Edward Francis Glass and Charles Edgar Butner based in Fresno, California. It operated from 1914 to around 1922. The two developed a proposal for a design competition for the Veterans' Memorial Building. Several of their works are listed on the National Register of Historic Places (NRHP).

Glass (March 8, 1885 - January 31, 1954) was born in San Francisco and grew up in Fresno, where he attended Fresno High School. He worked as a draftsman for two architectural firms in Philadelphia. He achieved a Certificate of Proficiency in Architecture in 1912, perhaps in Pennsylvania or perhaps in California.

Butner (July 31, 1888 - June 10, 1957) was born in Pennsylvania. He served in World War I as a pilot in the United States Army Air Service.

In 1922 there was some controversy, involving an article published as an interview, and statement of a member of the firm not being certified as an architect. Glass denounced the article in a letter to the Western Architect and Engineer.

Works by the firm include:

- Fresno Republican Printery Building (1919), 2130 Kern St., Fresno, CA (Butner, Charles; Glass, Edward), NRHP-listed
- Physicians Building (1926), 2607 Fresno St., Fresno, CA (Butner, Charles E.), NRHP-listed
- Twining Laboratories, 2527 Fresno St., Fresno, CA (Butner, Charles E.), NRHP-listed

Butner separately worked with Robert Stanton around 1936.
