= Easton, California =

Easton
- census-designated place
- Location in Fresno County and the state of California

- Location in the United States Easton (the United States)
- Coordinates: 36°39′01″N 119°47′27″W
- Country: United States
- State: California
- County: Fresno

Government
  - State Senator: Anna Caballero (D)
  - State Assembly: Joaquin Arambula (D)
  - U. S. Congress: Jim Costa (D)

Area
  - Total: 3.01 sq mi (7.80 km^{2})
  - Land: 3.01 sq mi (7.80 km^{2})
  - Water: 0 sq mi (0.00 km^{2}) 0%
- Elevation: 276 ft (84 m)

Population (2020)
  - Total: 1,972
  - Density: 654.9/sq mi (252.84/km^{2})
- Time zone: UTC-8 (PST)
  - Summer (DST): UTC-7 (PDT)
- ZIP code: 93706
- Area code: 559
- FIPS code: 06-20928
- GNIS feature IDs: 277503, 2408041

Easton (formerly, Covel and Covell) is a census-designated place (CDP) in Fresno County, California, United States. The population was 1,972 at the 2020 census, down from 2,083 at the 2010 census. Easton is located 7.5 miles (12.1 km) south of downtown Fresno, at an elevation of 276 feet (84 m).

== Geography ==
According to the United States Census Bureau, the CDP has a total area of 3.0 square miles (7.8 km^{2}), all land.

== History ==
Easton post office was established in 1881, moved in 1883, and closed in 1902. It reopened in 1952. The name honors O.W. Easton, a land agent.

== Demographics ==
Historical population
Census	Pop.	Note	%±
1970	1,065		—
1980	1,710		60.6%
1990	1,877		9.8%
2000	1,966		4.7%
2010	2,083		6.0%
2020	1,972		−5.3%
U.S. Decennial Census; 1860–1870 1880-1890; 1900 1910 1920; 1930 1940 1950; 1960 1970 1980; 1990 2000 2010; 2020

Easton appeared as an unincorporated community in the 1970 U.S. census; and as a census designated place in the 1980 U.S. census.

=== Racial and ethnic composition ===
Easton CDP, California – Racial and ethnic composition Note: the US Census treats Hispanic/Latino as an ethnic category. This table excludes Latinos from the racial categories and assigns them to a separate category. Hispanics/Latinos may be of any race.
Race / Ethnicity (NH = Non-Hispanic)	Pop 2000	Pop 2010	Pop 2020	% 2000	% 2010	% 2020
White alone (NH)	811	649	508	41.25%	31.16%	25.76%
Black or African American alone (NH)	9	13	17	0.46%	0.62%	0.86%
Native American or Alaska Native alone (NH)	13	14	11	0.66%	0.67%	0.56%
Asian alone (NH)	77	62	71	3.92%	2.98%	3.60%
Native Hawaiian or Pacific Islander alone (NH)	0	0	1	0.00%	0.00%	0.05%
Other race alone (NH)	0	1	10	0.00%	0.05%	0.51%
Mixed race or Multiracial (NH)	38	36	24	1.93%	1.73%	1.22%
Hispanic or Latino (any race)	1,018	1,308	1,330	51.78%	62.79%	67.44%
Total	1,966	2,083	1,972	100.00%	100.00%	100.00%

=== 2020 census ===
As of the 2020 census, Easton had a population of 1,972 and a population density of 654.9 inhabitants per square mile (252.9/km^{2}). The whole population lived in households.

There were 615 households, out of which 210 (34.1%) had children under the age of 18 living in them, 320 (52.0%) were married-couple households, 37 (6.0%) were cohabiting couple households, 153 (24.9%) had a female householder with no partner present, and 105 (17.1%) had a male householder with no partner present. 98 households (15.9%) were one person, and 59 (9.6%) were one person aged 65 or older. The average household size was 3.21. There were 478 families (77.7% of all households).

The age distribution was 487 people (24.7%) under the age of 18, 180 people (9.1%) aged 18 to 24, 502 people (25.5%) aged 25 to 44, 440 people (22.3%) aged 45 to 64, and 363 people (18.4%) who were 65 years of age or older. The median age was 37.4 years. For every 100 females, there were 97.2 males, and for every 100 females age 18 and over there were 96.4 males age 18 and over.

There were 653 housing units at an average density of 216.9 units per square mile (83.7 units/km^{2}), of which 615 (94.2%) were occupied. Of these, 443 (72.0%) were owner-occupied, and 172 (28.0%) were occupied by renters. The homeowner vacancy rate was 1.8%, and the rental vacancy rate was 3.9%. 0.0% of residents lived in urban areas, while 100.0% lived in rural areas.

=== Income and poverty ===
In 2023, the US Census Bureau estimated that the median household income was $92,446, and the per capita income was $50,077. About 9.6% of families and 16.7% of the population were below the poverty line.

=== 2010 census ===
The 2010 United States census reported that Easton had a population of 2,083. The population density was 691.7 inhabitants per square mile (267.1/km^{2}). The racial makeup of Easton was 1,248 (59.9%) White, 13 (0.6%) African American, 58 (2.8%) Native American, 68 (3.3%) Asian, 0 (0.0%) Pacific Islander, 593 (28.5%) from other races, and 103 (4.9%) from two or more races. Hispanic or Latino of any race were 1,308 persons (62.8%).

The Census reported that 2,083 people (100% of the population) lived in households, 0 (0%) lived in non-institutionalized group quarters, and 0 (0%) were institutionalized.

There were 629 households, out of which 266 (42.3%) had children under the age of 18 living in them, 369 (58.7%) were opposite-sex married couples living together, 91 (14.5%) had a female householder with no husband present, 50 (7.9%) had a male householder with no wife present. There were 32 (5.1%) unmarried opposite-sex partnerships, and 5 (0.8%) same-sex married couples or partnerships. 102 households (16.2%) were made up of individuals, and 46 (7.3%) had someone living alone who was 65 years of age or older. The average household size was 3.31. There were 510 families (81.1% of all households); the average family size was 3.66.

The population age distribution is 566 people (27.2%) under the age of 18, 231 people (11.1%) aged 18 to 24, 474 people (22.8%) aged 25 to 44, 532 people (25.5%) aged 45 to 64, and 280 people (13.4%) who were 65 years of age or older. The median age was 35.1 years. For every 100 females, there were 104.0 males. For every 100 females age 18 and over, there were 101.7 males.

There were 667 housing units at an average density of 221.5 per square mile (85.5/km^{2}), of which 629 were occupied, of which 423 (67.2%) were owner-occupied, and 206 (32.8%) were occupied by renters. The homeowner vacancy rate was 1.2%; the rental vacancy rate was 5.5%. 1,365 people (65.5% of the population) lived in owner-occupied housing units and 718 people (34.5%) lived in rental housing units.

== Education ==
Almost all of the CDP is served by the Washington Colony Elementary School District, while a small piece extends into the Orange Center Elementary School District. All of it is served by the Washington Unified School District for grades 9–12. Washington Union High School is the latter district's comprehensive high school.

== Notable people ==
- Marjaree Mason, for whom Fresno County's Marjaree Mason Center is named, was born in Easton.
- Deshawn Stevenson, basketball player for the Dallas Mavericks, lived in Easton.
- Matt Garza, Major League Baseball pitcher for five teams over twelve seasons, grew up and attended high school in Easton.
- Blackie Gejeian, was an American race car driver, race car builder, and hot rod enthusiast of Armenian descent.
