= YWCA Building (Fresno, California) =

Historic women's building in Fresno, California

- Y.W.C.A. Building
- U.S. National Register of Historic Places
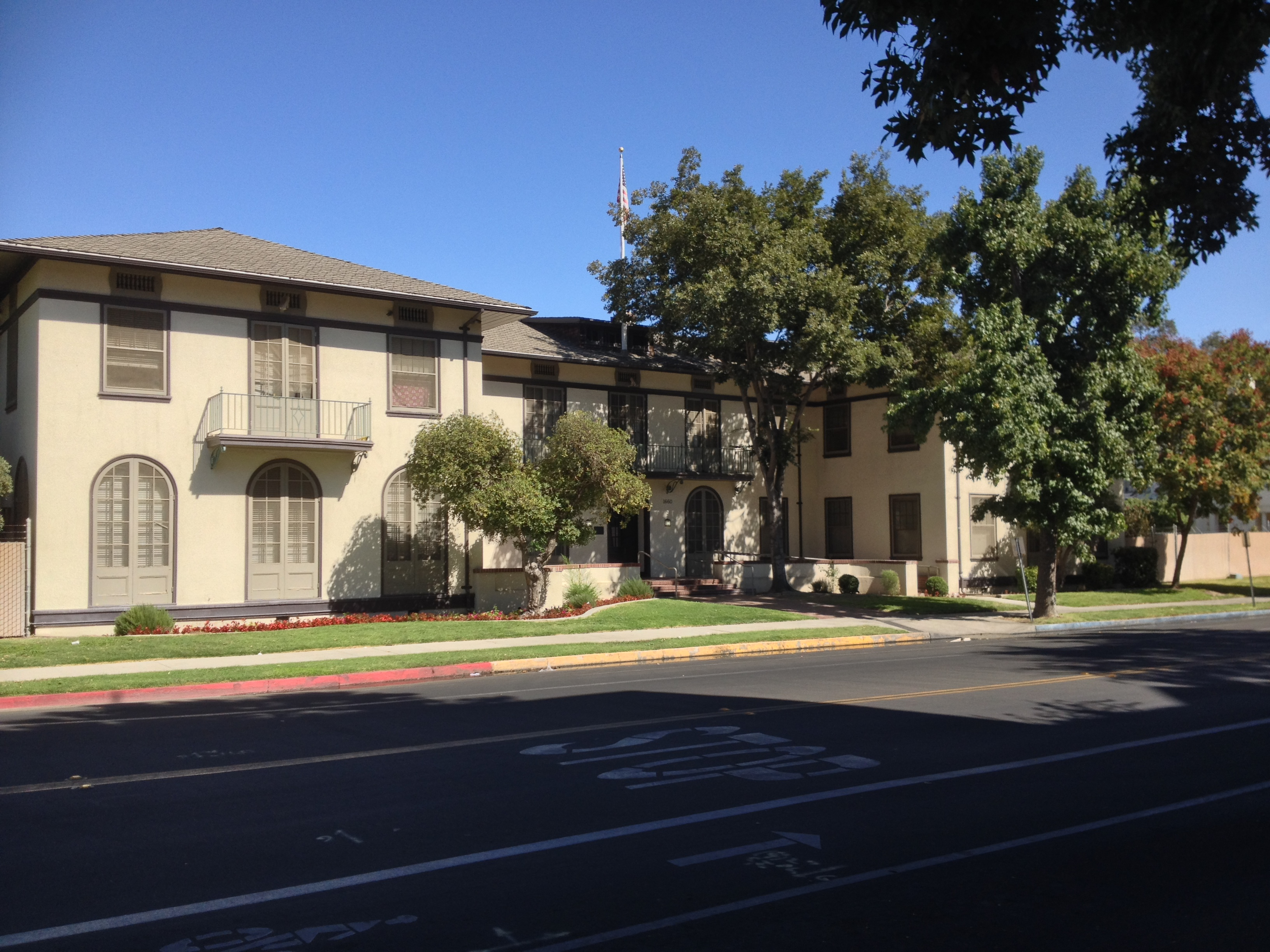
- The front entrance in 2017

- Location within California Location within the United States
- Location: 1660 M Street, Fresno, California 93721
- Coordinates: 36°44′35″N 119°47′39″W
- Built: 1922
- Architect: Julia Morgan
- Architectural style: Italian Renaissance Revival, Spanish Renaissance Revival, Italian Villa
- NRHP reference No.: 78000667
- Added to NRHP: September 21, 1978

The YWCA Building is a historic 1922 building in Fresno, California which later became part of the Marjaree Mason Center. Julia Morgan, the first female architect licensed in California, designed the former Young Women's Christian Association building.

== History ==
Local women founded the YWCA of Fresno in 1904 By 1920, the group had grown enough to build this residential building so they hired Morgan, the first female architect licensed in California, to design it. In anticipation of the new facility, the group held afternoon teas to recruit new members.

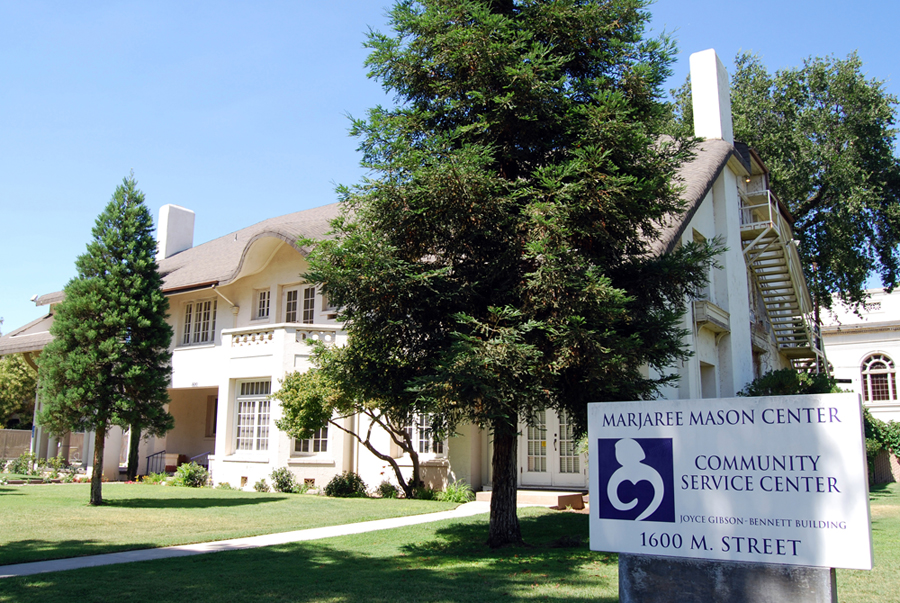
Adjacent YWCA Activity Unit, later the Joyce Gibson-Bennett Building

In addition to the residential building, the YWCA built a more public building downtown. Morgan also designed this YWCA Recreation Center on Toulumne Street which opened in 1923. But, in 1933, that the center closed due to the financial hardship of the Great Depression. It later served as an early home of the Pacific Bible Institute and, after extensive remodeling in 1965, became the Garden Court office building. In 1950 the organization purchased an adjacent house on M Street, turning it into the YWCA Activity Unit to serve a similar purpose as the earlier center.

During the post-war period, the Fresno YWCA continued to offer affordable housing but also engaged in a wide variety of other activities. These included running the Mar-Y-Mac summer camp and offering exercise classes.

In 1979, after the kidnapping, rape, and murder of Marjoree Mason by a deputy sheriff, the group set up an emergency hotline. The YWCA increasingly focused on domestic violence and the safety of women in general, repurposing the buildings as the "Marjoree Mason Center". In 1998, the group disaffiliated from the national Y to become an independent agency. In addition to continuing to offer housing, the group provides court accompaniment, group counseling, and community education. In 2025, the center moved to a newer and larger facility, the Isnardi Foundation Building.

== Architecture ==
The architecture of the building blends Italian Renaissance Revival with Spanish Renaissance Revival to create an Italian Villa style building. The "H" layout consists of two stories plus a usable attic. The design includes simple entablature trim and balconies. Inside, the first floor contains the common areas with the main lobby, library, reception room, and offices. The second floor contains bedrooms, bathrooms, kitchens, dining rooms, storage, and a sewing room. The attic originally included a screened-in sleeping area for the hot San Joaquin Valley but it was later closed in after the installation of air conditioning.

Julia Morgan designed many other YWCA buildings in California and beyond. but still took the time to come on site in Fresno to assess the progress of construction. The National Register of Historic Places listed the building in 1978.

== See also ==
- List of YWCA buildings
- List of works by Julia Morgan
- National Register of Historic Places listings in Fresno County, California
