= Marjaree Mason Center =

Named to honour of a woman murdered by her ex-boyfriend

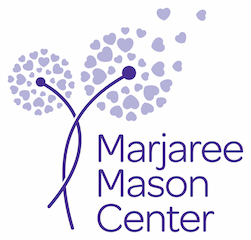
Logo

The Marjaree Mason Center is a non-profit, shelter-based, domestic violence program headquartered in Fresno, California, which serves the whole of Fresno County. Named for an Easton, California woman who was murdered by her ex-boyfriend, the center was founded in 1979 and operates one of the largest shelters in California. As of 2024, it is the only full-time service providing shelters for those affected by domestic violence in the county, which has a population over a million and the highest rate of reported domestic violence per person in the state.

== History ==
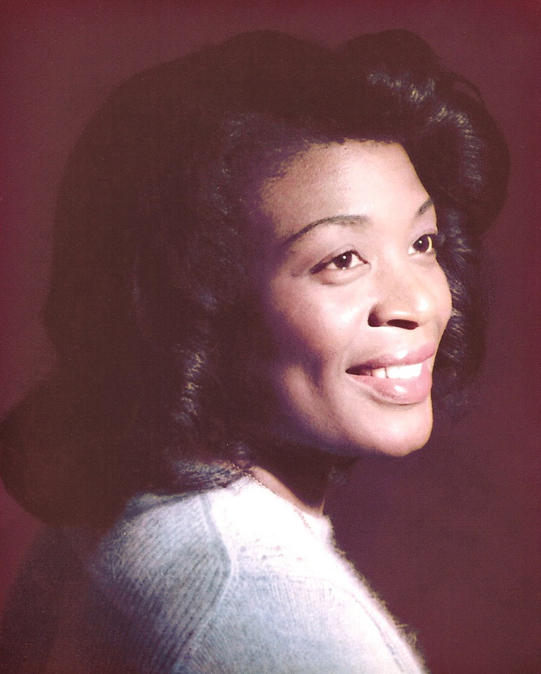
Marjaree Mason

The non-profit was founded in 1979, after the murder, the previous November, of a 36-year-old local woman for whom it was named; Mason had been fatally shot by a former boyfriend who was a sheriff's bailiff. By 1984, its Fresno shelter could house 24 women and it was beginning to extend its reach beyond the city to cover other towns in the county, including Kingsburg, as well as rural areas.

In 2004 the Fresno emergency shelter had 101 places, and the charity was estimated to help 5,400 women and children a year. That year the charity was planning to open its second center, a 18-bed center in Reedley, in the south of the county, also intended to serve Selma, Sanger and Fowler, which was described in the Selma Enterprise as "Fresno County's first rural domestic violence shelter." In 2006 the Marjaree Mason Center was organizing one of four established programs across the United States assisting prostitutes with homelessness and drug addiction. In 2013, a third 28-bed shelter opened in Clovis.

In July 2024, Fresno City Council provided $300,000 in funding to the Marjaree Mason Center to supplement federal funding via the Victims of Crime Act (VOCA) Crime Victim's Fund, after substantial cuts threatened services.

== Services ==
Marjaree Mason Center serves Fresno County. The main emergency shelter in Fresno houses 140 people (as of 2024); the charity also provides a drop-in center and a telephone hotline offering advice to women it is unable to accommodate.

== See also ==
- YWCA Building (Fresno, California)
- Joyce Gibson-Bennett Building
- National Domestic Violence Hotline
- Domestic violence in the United States
