= Fresno Bee Building =

- U.S. National Register of Historic Places
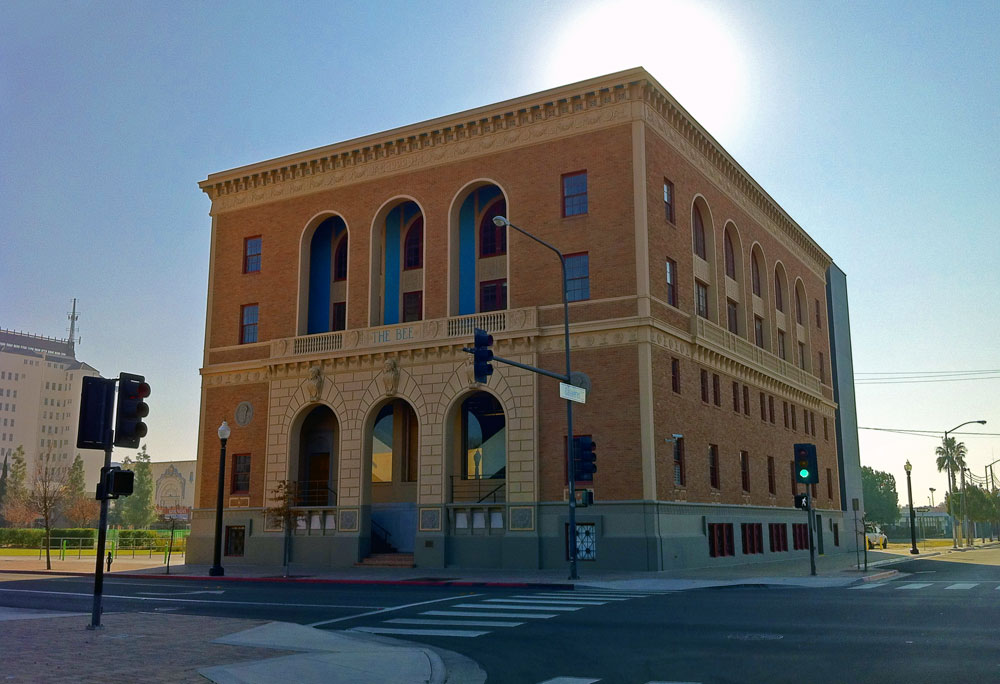

- Location within California Location within the United States
- Location: 1555 Van Ness Ave., Fresno, California
- Coordinates: 36°44′25″N 119°47′41″W
- Built: 1922
- Architect: Leonard F. Starks
- Architectural style: Classical Revival
- NRHP reference No.: 82000964
- Added to NRHP: November 01, 1982

The Fresno Bee Building is a historic 5-story building located at Van Ness and Calaveras Street in downtown Fresno, California. It was built in 1922 by architect Leonard F. Starks to house the offices and printery for The Fresno Bee newspaper.

The building underwent numerous modifications, the natural consequence of growth and changes in the newspaper and printing industries. The 1922 structure remained virtually original until 1936 when an addition was constructed to accommodate an enlarged engraving department and studio space for radio station KMJ. Designed by Fresno architectural firm Franklin and Kump, the four-floor addition was connected to the building at the south elevation. The most significant modification came in 1951, when a new entrance wing and pressroom were designed by Lockwood Greene and Dunbar Beck.

The newspaper relocated in 1975 leaving the building abandoned for many years. From 1981 to 1984, members of the community raised more than $5.5 million to open the Fresno Metropolitan Museum inside the building. The Museum opened its doors on April 8, 1984. In August 2005, the museum began an extensive interior renovation. The museum reopened on November 13, 2008. The $28 million renovation project brought the historic building into the 21st century with more accessible gallery space, new restroom facilities and elevators, and remodeled fourth and fifth floors. The building underwent significant structural enhancements, specifically on the west wall from the footings below the basement up to the fifth floor. The existing support columns consisting of steel reinforced concrete were enhanced in the basement and first floor. On January 5, 2010, the museum closed due to its inability to pay off the increasing deficit from the renovation and operations. The City of Fresno became the new owners of the building.

The Fresno Bee building sat vacant until April 13, 2012, when the Community Media Access Collaborative (CMAC) located its public, educational, and government access television station on the second floor. CMAC constructed a 900 square foot television studio in the former museum's main exhibit space which extends into the third floor, and created classroom and office spaces. As of March 2021, the first, fourth and fifth floors remain unoccupied.

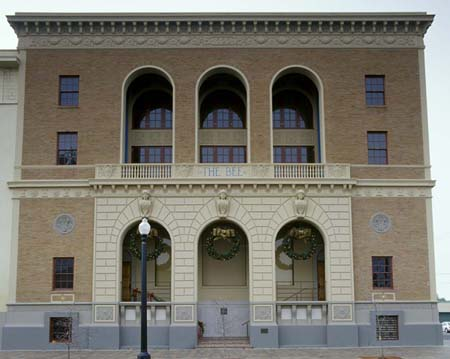
Facade.

== See also ==
- Fresno Republican Printery Building
- National Register of Historic Places listings in Fresno County, California
