= Physicians Building =

- U.S. National Register of Historic Places
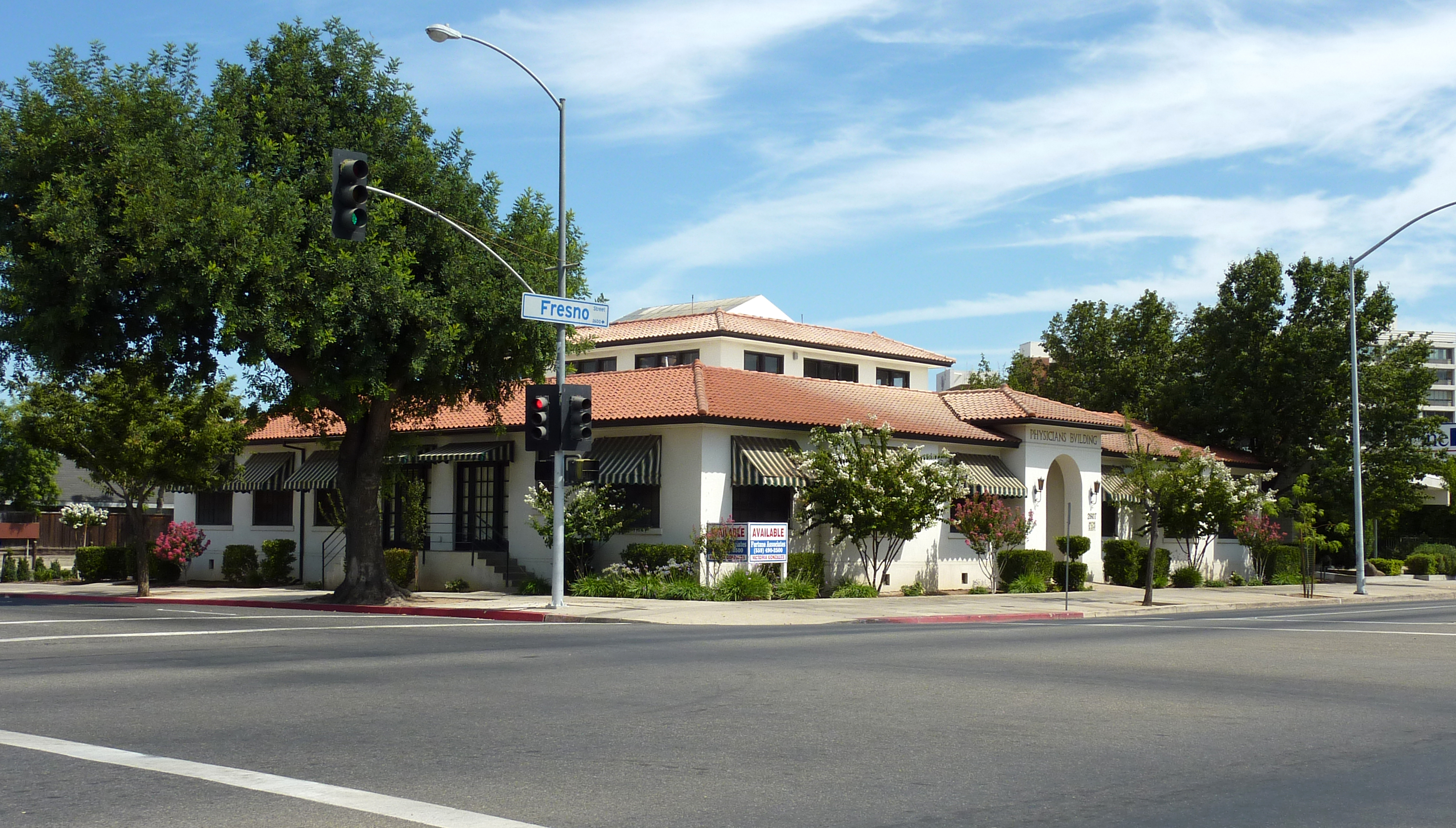

- Location within California
- Location: 2607 Fresno St., Fresno, California
- Coordinates: 36°44′26″N 119°47′06″W
- Area: less than one acre
- Built: 1926
- Built by: R. Pedersen
- Architect: Charles E. Butner
- Architectural style: Mediterranean Revival, Italianate
- NRHP reference No.: 78000664
- Added to NRHP: November 20, 1978

The Physicians Building in Fresno, California, at 2607 Fresno St., was built in 1926. It was listed on the National Register of Historic Places in 1978.

It is a building of office units opening out into a central, interior courtyard topped by a large skylight and clerestory window. It was designed by architect Charles E. Butner and built by contractor R. Pedersen. It is an extraordinary hybrid of Mediterranean Revival and Italianate styles. Its National Register nomination states:

At the time of its design and construction in 1926, the Physicians Building consisted of some twenty-eight rooms, grouped into separate office units which opened out onto a centrally built interior court. With an area of over a thousand square feet, the courtyard was an exceptionally large common space for a building with exterior dimensions of approximately 73 x 85 feet. An octagonal fountain and fish pond, some eight feet across and built of a beige-colored stone, was designed to provide a bench surface as well as atmospheric character for the central axis of the medical building. Rising some 18 feet above a floor surface of highly polished serpentine-green linoleum tile (at the time, a technological wonder which provided the rich tonal range of genuine marble), a superbly detailed skylight allowed natural light to filter into this large court-space through individually set panes of pebbled glass installed below a clerestory roof. Built of some 13 inches of milled and layered Cyma-Recta double curves, the finished woodwork which made up the ceiling's structural element was painted an off-white, in keeping with the intricacy of its classically Italianate appearance. Eight quarter columns with simple striped and banded crests at capital height, as well as four corner columns, completed the formal symmetry of this elegant medical reception area.

Originally located at the edge of town, adjacent to residential areas bordering to the east and west, Physicians Building offered a particularly handsome entrance elevation along its frontage on Fresno Street. Its clean, white stucco walls (over a brick substructure) contrasted brilliantly with a typically-Californian red-tile roof. Exterior details were markedly subtle, a factor contributing to the building having been mislabelled as simply "Spanish Style." Sash-type screened windows with full cast projecting sills. A recessed arched entrance positioned on the central axis, with a radial fan window over double french-style doors; a simple chamfered projecting base (Plinth) which banded the entire building; and the formal, engraved Roman Majuscules denoting Physicians Building; were all details more in keeping with the stricter tenets of the Italianate mode. Window trims and door casements were painted an: electric thalo blue-green, and the front six paired windows were shielded by brilliantly striped canvas awnings — additions of raw color reminiscent of the lively theatricality of mezzo-mediterranean cultures.

During the late 1960s, Physicians Building suffered an unfortunate aesthetic injustice when it was "modernized" by individuals insensitive to its architectural significance as a Mediterranean revival hybrid.

It has also been known as Civic Center Professional Building.
