= Stoner House =

- U.S. National Register of Historic Places
- Location within California
- Location: 21143 E. Weldon Ave., Fresno County, California, near Sanger, California
- Coordinates: 36.764606°N 119.408684°W
- Area: 19.7 acres (8.0 ha)
- Built: 1910
- Architectural style: California Bungalow
- NRHP reference No.: 85003145
- Added to NRHP: October 17, 1985

The Stoner House, in Fresno County, California near Sanger, California, was built in 1910. It was listed on the National Register of Historic Places in 1985. The listing included two contributing buildings (a house and a barn) on 19.7 acres (8.0 ha).

The house, also known as Stoner Mansion, is a Craftsman in style. It is characterized as a bungalow but it is larger than small bungalows in urban areas. It has a 360-degree view from the top of a knoll in "beautiful Tivy Valley." It is a one-and-a-half-story 36 by 59 feet (11 m × 18 m) building with four gables.

A two-level wood frame barn 36 by 60 feet (11 m × 18 m) is the one outbuilding.

It is located at 21143 E. Weldon Ave.
