= Shorty Lovelace Historic District =

Historic district in California, United States

- U.S. National Register of Historic Places
- U.S. Historic district
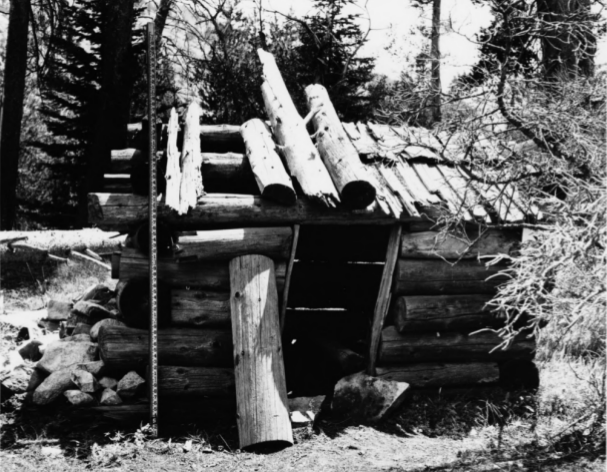
- Cabin at Woods Creek, 1967

- Location within California Location within the United States
- Nearest city: Pinehurst, California
- Coordinates: 36°44′26″N 118°31′3″W
- Built: 1910
- Architect: Shorty Lovelace
- NRHP reference No.: 78000293
- Added to NRHP: January 31, 1978

The Shorty Lovelace Historic District includes a series of cabins built in Kings Canyon National Park by trapper Joseph Walter "Shorty" Lovelace between 1910 and 1940. Lovelace was the first non-Native American to live year-round in the upper Kings River Canyon. Lovelace may have built as many as thirty-six structures in the area, with possibly a dozen surviving. Lovelace built his first cabins in 1912 at Crowley Canyon. The cabins were typically five feet by seven feet with dirt floors.

Structures include:

- Williams (Quartz) Meadow Cabin
- Sphinx Creek Cabin
- Crowley Canyon Cabin
- Granite Pass Cabin
- Vidette Meadow Cabin
- Gardiner Creek Cabin
- Woods Creek Cabin
- Cloud Canyon Cabin
- Lower Bubbs Creek
