= Birdwell Rock Petroglyph Site =

Archaeological site in California, United States

- U.S. National Register of Historic Places
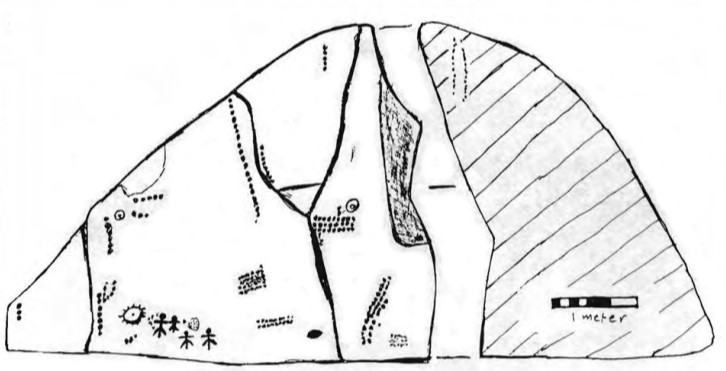
- Sketch depicting Birdwell Rock from a U.S. Bureau of Land Management report
- Nearest city: Coalinga, California
- NRHP reference No.: 03000117
- Added to NRHP: March 12, 2003

The Birdwell Rock Petroglyph Site is an archeological site featuring a large sandstone boulder elaborately decorated with prehistoric markings, located at the edge of the San Joaquin Valley, near Coalinga, Fresno County, California. Birdwell Rock is one of many Native American rock art sites in close proximity.

== History ==
In 1987, the California Department of Forestry and Fire Protection (CDF) initiated an archeological field survey in the vicinity of Los Gatos Creek Canyon, approximately 20 miles northwest of Coalinga. CDF intended to perform controlled burns in the area and wanted to locate and evaluate any archeological sites that would potentially be affected.

Two archeological sites had already been recorded nearby: Joaquin Mill (CA-FRE-1345), an extensive prehistoric site located along White creek recorded by Jim Woodward and Don Manuel in a 1980 archeological site report as well as Cupule Point (CA-FRE-2109), a cluster of sandstone boulders decorated with cupules, which was recorded in a 1986 archeological report. The Birdwell Rock site was not officially recorded but it was visited by a staff archeologist for the Bureau of Land Management (BLM) in 1982 who generically referred to it as "Westside Solstice Site".

The CDF field survey crew visited known archeological sites and were told about more potential sites by local ranchers and landowners. In a 1990 report describing the results of the survey, archeologists Daniel G. Foster and Richard C. Jenkins named and recorded the Birdwell Rock site for the first time as well as four more new sites in the area. CA-FRE-2244 was assigned to Birdwell Rock as a Smithsonian trinomial archeological site identifier. "Birdwell" is a reference to the landowner who provided access to the site, Kenneth Birdwell.

The Birdwell Rock site and nearby rock art sites have continued to be a subject of academic study. The exact address is kept confidential to prevent vandalism.

== Significance ==
Birdwell Rock sits in the area of Joaquin Ridge, part of the Diablo Range in Fresno County, California, along an unnamed seasonal drainage path. The hilly area is adjacent to the vast, flat San Joaquin Valley and specifically, at the edge of historic Tulare Lake. The area has many sandstone cliffs and decorated boulders, but Birdwell Rock is the most elaborately decorated.

It is known that the Tachi tribe or Tache, a Yokuts people inhabited this area but it is not fully understood when Birdwell Rock was carved or by which tribe. In modern retellings, the carvers are referred to as "the old ones". One archeologist placed its origination in the Late Formative stage of North American prehistory. The exact meaning and use of the site is similarly unconfirmed, however one BLM archeologist has proposed it is a ceremonial site, possibly involving initiation rites, control of rain and wind by shamans or observation of astronomical events.

The markings on the boulder depict at least six heavily weathered male anthropomorphic figures, as well a circle with a central dot and short lines radiating from the circle, a possible sundisk. Pits and indentations form lines and grids and a small mortar cup has been developed near the base of the boulder. Artifacts were found inside the mortar cup, including a stone pestle and a chert "egg" tool.

The boulder was damaged in the 1983 Coalinga earthquake, widening two central fissures and breaking loose a large chunk of rock. The red-colored patina also largely disappeared.

The site was added to the National Register of Historic Places on March 12, 2003.
