= Coalinga Polk Street School =

- U.S. National Register of Historic Places
- Location within California
- Location: S. 5th and E. Polk Sts., Coalinga, California
- Coordinates: 36°08′11″N 120°21′15″W
- Area: less than one acre
- Built: 1908
- Architectural style: Classical Revival
- NRHP reference No.: 82002175
- Added to NRHP: May 6, 1982

The Coalinga Polk Street School, in Coalinga, California, was listed on the National Register of Historic Places in 1982 and destroyed by an earthquake in 1983.

Also known as Old Polk Street School, it was located at S. 5th and E. Polk streets in Coalinga and was built in 1908.

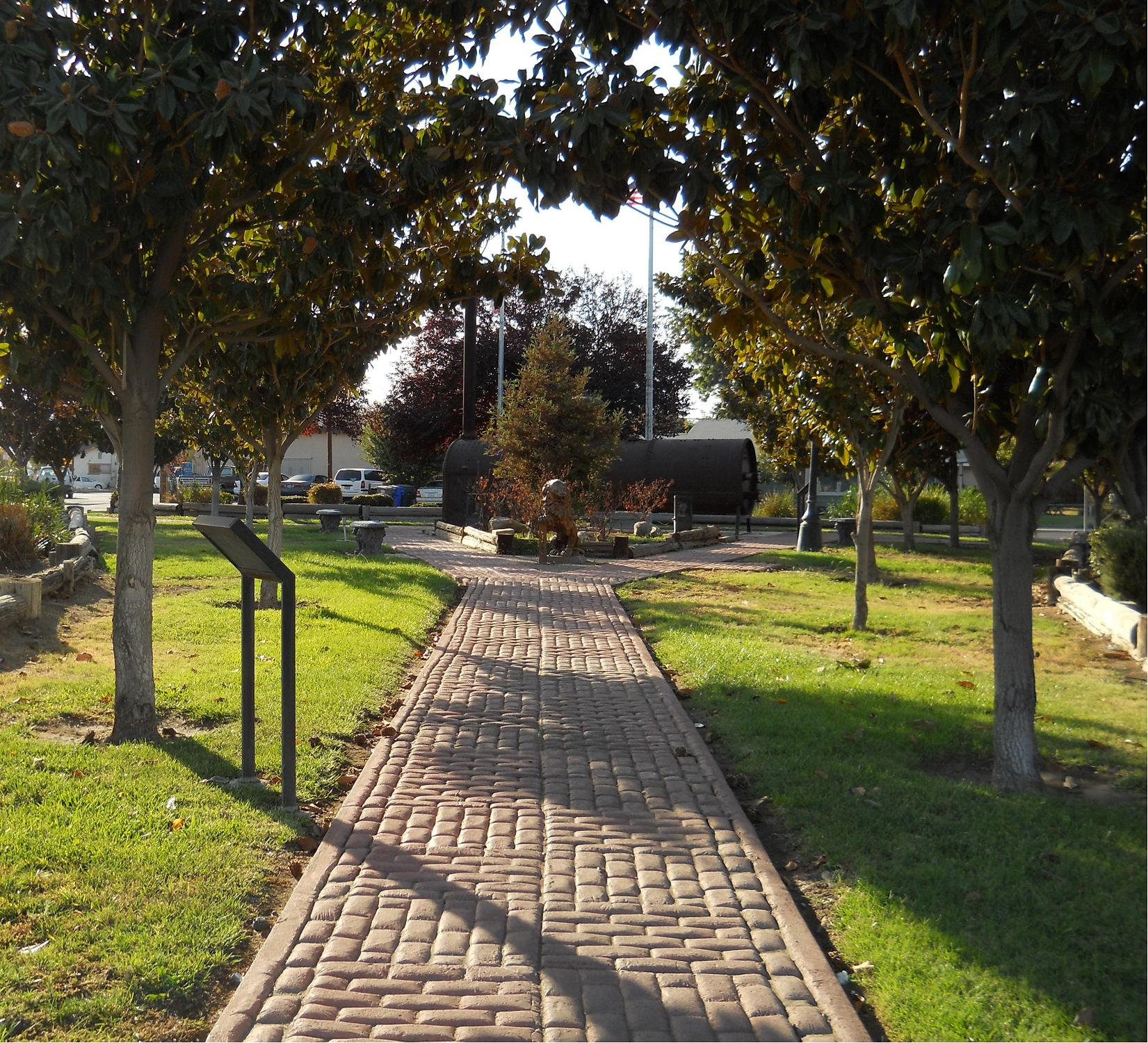
Site of the school in 2014

Its bell tower is on display at the R.C. Baker Museum in Coalinga.

It had an irregular plan within a 143 by 84 feet (44 m × 26 m) rectangular area, and had elements of Classical Revival style, esp. in its entrance portico on its north facade.
