= Twining Laboratories =

- U.S. National Register of Historic Places
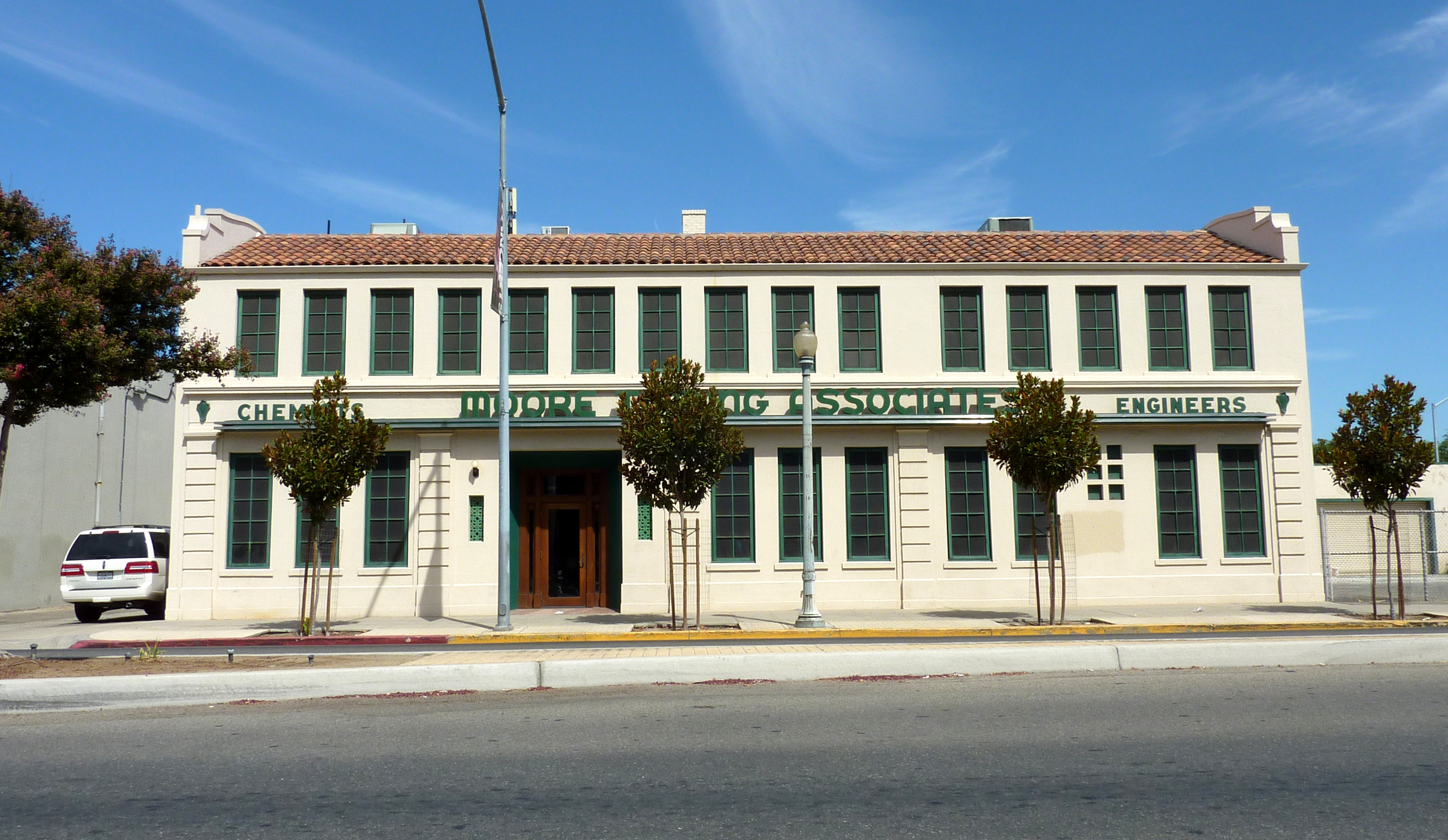

- Location within California
- Location: 2527 Fresno St., Fresno, California
- Coordinates: 36°45′29″N 119°47′12″W
- Area: 0.4 acres (0.16 ha)
- Built: 1930; 96 years ago modified: 1935, 1942, 1943
- Built by: Fisher & McNulty
- Architect: Charles E. Butner
- Architectural style: Mediterranean Revival
- NRHP reference No.: 91000308
- Added to NRHP: March 26, 1991

Twining Laboratories, at 2527 Fresno St. in Fresno, California, was built in 1930. The building was listed on the National Register of Historic Places in 1991.

It was designed in Mediterranean Revival style by architect Charles E. Butner and built by contractors Fisher & McNulty to serve as a chemical testing lab.

It was modified by additions in 1935, 1942, and 1943.
