= Dick Megugorac =

- Born: February 5, 1928; Santa Monica, California, US
- Died: January 13, 2016 (aged 87); Phoenix, Arizona, US
- Other names: Magoo
- Occupation: Customizer
- Years active: 1940s–2010s
- Known for: Automotive pioneer
- Spouse: Lois Riggen
- Children: 2

Richard Megugorac (February 5, 1928 – January 13, 2016), commonly known as Dick or by his nickname Magoo, was an American land speed racer and customizer.

== Early life ==
Megugorac was born in Santa Monica, California, on February 5, 1928. In his early teens, he began working on cars, starting before he got his driver's license; he joined the Low Flyers Racing Club whose members included Stu Hilborn, Jack Engle, George Barris, and Jack McGrath. He spent 18 months with the American occupation forces in Japan after World War II as a mechanic's instructor, and returned to settle in Los Angeles, setting up a garage there.

== Customizing career ==
In the 1960s, Megugorac and brother-in-law Carl Riggen co-founded Riggen Slot Cars to capitalize on the fad at the time; the company became one of the most successful makers of slot cars. In the 1960s, he opened Magoo's Hot Rods in Canoga Park, California; he would be aided by his (later) wife, Lois, who did upholstery work.

Megugorac built "some of rodding's most prominent hot rods", including a number of entries for the Grand National Roadster Show at Oakland, among them the winning car of the 1979 America's Most Beautiful Roadster trophy. Known as Deucari, and built for Brian Burnett, this was a highboy Deuce powered by a Ferrari V-12, and is still running. Megugorac provided the first-ever Goodguys giveaway car, a '29 roadster, and built early giveaway cars for the National Street Rod Association. Megugorac customized almost all aspects of his cars, including chassis fabrication, engine building, body work, and custom paint, although he left upholstery to his wife. Megugorac focused on getting the details correct when car customizing, and had a reputation for building cars that had "bomb-proof reliability" and "could be driven anywhere, anytime". "Lil' John" Buttera said that if he wanted a custom car to actually drive, he would go to Megugorac.

Many of Megugorac's project cars were featured in major magazines, including Hot Rod, Rod & Custom, Street Rodder, and others. Megugorac was named to Darryl Starbird's National Rod & Custom Hall of Fame. Among his admirers, and a longtime friend, was Tom Medley, creator of Stroker McGurk, who drove a signature '29 highboy roadster. "Magoo builds really bitchin' '29s," Medley once said. "Stroker would have approved!"

== Personal life ==
Megugorac met Lois Riggen, Carl Riggen's sister, in Los Angeles in the 1940s. They were married for 40 years and had two sons.

Megugorac died on January 13, 2016, in Phoenix, Arizona, age 87.
