= Pete Millar (cartoonist) =

American cartoonist (1929–2003)

- Millar, photographed in 1965
- Born: December 14, 1929 Oakland, California, U.S.
- Died: February 28, 2003 (aged 73) Palos Verdes Peninsula, California, U.S.
- Areas: Illustrator, cartoonist, sculptor
- Pseudonym: Millarkey
- Notable works: Arin Cee; CARtoons Magazine; Drag Cartoons, Millar Publishing Company
- Spouse: Orah Mae (m. 1954–2020)

Peter Millar (1929 – 2003) was an American illustrator, cartoonist, and drag racer best known for his work with CARtoons and Drag Cartoons magazines. Millar often used the pen name "Millarkey".

== Career ==
=== Arin Cee ===
Millar's first published strip was Arin Cee, produced for Rod & Custom (R&C) magazine beginning in 1955 and continuing into the 1960s.

=== CARtoons Magazine ===
Millar co-created CARtoons Magazine in 1959, which was published by the Petersen Publishing Company. The first issue of CARtoons included the story of the hot rod community as a social collective and introduced the term "Rumpsville" (referring to "hot rod heaven"). Millar worked on CARtoons until 1963, when he was replaced by Hot Rod editor and "Stroker McGurk" creator Tom Medley.

=== Drag Cartoons/Millar Publishing ===
In June 1963, Millar founded Drag Cartoons under the Millar Publishing Company label. Drag Cartoons featured early adventures of Gilbert Shelton's iconic underground comix character Wonder Wart-Hog, who appeared in many issues. Millar published 49 issues of Drag Cartoons between 1963 and 1968. Then Mike Doherty published at least six issues of The Best of Drag Cartoons from 1969 to 1971, and the one-shot The Wildest Drag Cartoons #1 in 1970. (The title was later continued for two additional issues by a different publisher in 1999 and 2000.) Millar Publishing Company also produced two issues of a Wonder Wart-Hog comic book in 1968, as well as four issues of the popular Big Daddy Roth magazine in 1964–1965.

=== European sabbatical ===
In 1968, Millar and his wife and three daughters left the U.S. and traveled through Europe, living in Sweden and Spain, and touring Finland, the Soviet Union, and other Eastern Bloc and Mediterranean countries. Millar financed much of their trip through illustration work for American magazines; he also began making fine art paintings.

=== Drag Comics and other work ===
Returning to the U.S. in 1971, Millar created and published six issues of Pete Millar's Drag Comics while also working as an illustrator and scale model builder. His work was used in court proceedings to demonstrate traffic and industrial accidents.

=== Sculpture ===
Millar was also a bronze sculptor with his main emphasis focus being Western art depicting dramatic scenes of horseback riding, cowboys, bronco riders, mountain men, Native Americans, and more. His pieces are signed and numbered, usually limited to 200-300 per sculpture. They often sell for thousands of dollars, and one of his pieces was recently being offered in an art gallery in a large Las Vegas casino.

Millar's sculpting began after his daughter brought home some clay for a school art project. He had fun with the clay and progressed from there. He was eventually commissioned by major galleries to produce works for their clientele.

== Exhibitions ==
- 2008 Pasadena Museum of California Art (Pasadena, California): "Tales from the Strip: The Hot Rod Comics and Drag Racing Cartoons of Pete Millar"
