= Rumpsville =

Fictional location

Rumpsville (rŭmps'vĭl') slang n. also Rumpville (rŭmp'vĭl') is the name of a fictional place described as "Hot Rod heaven." The term was originally used in the CARtoons Magazine comic strip “Saga of Rumpville” by Pete Millar a.k.a. Arin Cee, published in 1959. The term Rumpsville was later redefined in the Sports Illustrated cover article “The Car Cult From Rumpsville,” when Le Roi Smith refers to Rumpsville as "hot rod heaven."

== Comic ==
The first issue of CARtoons (published by Petersen Publishing Company in 1959) featured the strip "The Saga of Rumpville". Written and illustrated by Pete Millar, in the story hot rodders decide to buy and move to Catalina Island to get away from the general public, who see drag racing and car enthusiasts as trouble. The hot rodders rename Catalina Island "Rumpsville" and abandon the main land. While all the rodders are offshore the automobiles and roadways fall into disrepair. Later, the government pleads with the hot rodders to return. After seeing how things had become so bad without their support the Rodders move back and everyone appreciates that the hot rodders are an essential part of society.

== Magazine ==
In the April 24, 1961, Sport Illustrated cover story, “The Cult From Rumpsville,” the term "Rumpsville" is used by Le Roi Smith, editor of Hot Rod magazine, and is quoted "It's where hot rodders could go and all the people would know about mechanical things. Hot rod heaven, that's Rumpsville. When you hop up an engine, it makes a noise like 'rump, rump!' That's where it comes from, man, like from Wildsville."

== Other publications ==
A reference to Rumpsville can be found in the book Rat Fink: The Art of Ed "Big Daddy" Roth (Last Gasp Publishing, 2003) ISBN 0-86719-545-2, by Douglas Nason, Greg Escalante, and Doug Harvey. The foreword, written by C.R. Stecyk III and Ren Messer, is titled "Road to Rumpsville".

== Webzine ==
Rumpsville the web site, first launched in 1995 is considered the first hot rod-related website. The website is a collection of interviews and short articles about Art Himsl, Ed Roth, George Barris, Kenny Howard, Norm Grabowski, and Tom Kelly. The web site pays homage to Pete Millar, the originator of the term, by giving him the honor of being proclaimed the Mayor of Rumpsville.
