= Cycle (magazine) =

American motorcycling enthusiast magazine

- Founder: Robert E. Petersen
- Founded: April 1950
- Country: United States
- Based in: Westlake Village, California
- Language: English

Cycle was an American motorcycling enthusiast magazine, published from April 1950 through October 1991. During its heyday, in the 1970s and 1980s, it had a circulation of more than 500,000 and was headquartered in Westlake Village, California, near the canyon roads of the Santa Monica Mountains, where Cycle's editors frequently road tested and photographed test bikes.

== History ==
Cycle was founded by Robert E. Petersen of Trend Inc. and Petersen Publishing, which also published Hot Rod and Motor Trend magazines. Petersen sold Cycle to Floyd Clymer in July 1953. In an anniversary issue of Cycle, his editorial approach was summed up as, "[He] never met a motorcycle he didn't like. Clymer owned Cycle until 1966, when he sold the publication to the New York-based publishing company Ziff-Davis Publications, which owned it through the mid-1980s. CBS, which also owned Cycle's main competitor, Cycle World, purchased Cycle in 1985; Diamandis Communications owned both magazines for a short time in 1988. In April of that year both were sold to Hachette Filipacchi Media U.S. The company folded the magazine to focus on its other magazine, Cycle World.

=== Ownership ===
- April 1950 – July 1953: Robert E. Petersen
- August 1953 – 1966: Floyd Clymer
- March 1966 – April 1985: Ziff-Davis
- May 1985 – December 1987: CBS Publications
- January 1988 – April 1988: Diamandis Communications
- 1988–Early 1990s: Hachette Filipacchi Media U.S.

== Editors and contributors ==
During the Ziff-Davis years, Cycle was known for editorial integrity, technical expertise, and humor. Editors-in-chief were Gordon Jennings (1966-1969), Cook Neilson (1969-1979), and Phil Schilling (1979-1988). P. Thomas Sargent was publisher. Jennings, a self-educated engineer and journalist, worked on and off as a technical and contributing editor for two decades after his editorship. He was beloved among Cycle readers—known for his acerbic wit, his technical know-how, his easy-to-understand project and "basic" articles, and his 1973 Two-Stroke Tuner's Handbook, which is still highly sought after by tuners. He was also editor-in-chief of Car and Driver Magazine, another Ziff-Davis publication, from 1970-1971. Neilson, popular for his irreverent, entertaining, and insightful writing, was promoted to editor in 1969, at the age of 26. He is credited with making the magazine successful through the 1970s and popularizing the comparison test format. In addition to being a journalist, he was also a successful motorcycle racer, best known for a much celebrated 1977 Daytona Superbike win on a Phil Schilling-tuned Ducati 750 Supersport nicknamed "Old Blue" and "the California Hot Rod." Neilson was inducted into the AMA Motorcycle Hall of Fame in 2006. Schilling, who worked for Cycle for nearly 20 years, is best known for his exceptional race-tuning expertise and for connecting his readers to the heart of the motorcycling experience. In 1974, during a short sabbatical from the magazine, he wrote The Motorcycle World (RidgePress/Random House, 1974), one of the first general-interest books about motorcycles and motorcycle racing, still in demand today. Schilling was inducted to the Motorcycle Hall of Fame in 2011.

At the end of 1988, Hachette Filipacchi moved Cycle from Westlake Village to Newport Beach, California, to the same offices that housed Cycle World. At that time, the two magazines were consolidated under one publisher and advertising staff. Steve Anderson, previously with Cycle World, became editor-in-chief. Anderson, an engineer himself, maintained Cycle's technical focus and the editorial excellence associated with his predecessors. Hachette Filipacchi closed Cycle in the early 1990s, much to the chagrin of its many fans.

In the early 1990s, Anderson, Jennings, and Kevin Cameron (and others) founded "Wheelbase," a pioneering on-line subscription-based electronic magazine for motorcycle and car enthusiasts. Dean Adams of Superbike Planet.com described it as "essentially what we know now as a web site, produced before the majority of the world was aware the Internet existed."

Regular long-time contributors to Cycle included Kevin Cameron ("TDC"), Ed Hertfelder ("The Duct Tapes"), Jim Greening ("Pipeline"), and Michael Shuter ("Downhill Straight"). Art Directors: Eberhard Luethke, Cheh Nam Low, Paul Halesworth, Tom Saputo, and Barbara Goss. Many of Cycle's former writers and contributors still work in the motorcycle industry or for other motorcycle or automotive publications.

Among contributors was cartoonist Tom Medley, best known for Stroker McGurk; he would create an equivalent character, Flat Out Snodgrass, for Cycle.'
