= CARtoons Magazine =

American magazine

- Categories: Automobile magazine / Humor magazine
- Frequency: Quarterly, bi-monthly, 8x/year
- Publisher: Robert E. Petersen
- Founder: Carl Kohler and Pete Millar
- Founded: 1959
- Final issue Number: (original) August 1991; 185
- Company: Robert E. Petersen Publication Company
- Country: United States
- Language: English
- Website: cartoonsmag.com

CARtoons magazine is an American publication that focuses on automotive humor and hot rod artwork. Originated by Carl Kohler and drag-racing artist Pete Millar, it was published by Robert E. Petersen Publication Company as a quarterly starting in 1959. Editors over the years included Carl Kohler, Dick Day, Jack Bonestell, and Dennis Ellefson. The original CARtoons went defunct in 1991. In 2016, CARtoons resumed publication under new ownership of the trademark, and is currently published bimonthly.

The original CARtoons featured articles, comic strips, step-by-step how-to drawing pages and more. The first issue included a comic strip, Rumpsville: The Saga of Rumpville, illustrated by Millar. In the 1960s until 1975 it carried the Unk and them Varmints strip (by Mike Arens and Willie Ito). However, the original "Unk" was "Unk Kohler", Carl Kohler, one of the founder creators, who also created the "Varmints".

Through the years, some of the featured artists were Alex Toth, Tom Medley, Mike Arens, Jim Willoughby, Russ Manning, Willie Ito, Dale Hale, George Trosley (creator of Krass & Bernie), John Kovalic, Shawn Kerri (one of the few women who drew for the magazine), Duane Bibby, Steve Austin, Dave Deal, Joe Borer, Nelson Dewey, Bob Hardin, John Larter, Robert Williams, William Stout, Quentin Miller, Jim Grube, Errol McCarthy, and Dennis Ellefson.

Carl had four sons with his second wife, Sylvia: Glen, Christopher, Matt and Peter. The first issue of CARtoons was created at the family home in Burbank. At the time, Christopher was so inspired by it all that he decided to become a cartoonist when he grew up. And he did, beginning to sell some of his work in his teen years. He also did some cartoon pages for CARtoons and CYCLEtoons, years later when Ellefson was editor.

Publications closely related to the original CARtoons were CYCLEtoons, SURFtoons and Hot Rod Cartoons. (Peterson also published three issues of Choppertoons, of which very little has been written.)

== Publication history ==
Originally published quarterly, in 1962 the magazine became bi-monthly. During some years in the 1970s and 1980s, the magazine published eight issues per year.

In 1975, the magazine underwent a complete overhaul with a new logo, new artists and new features. The late 1970s and early 1980s issues included iron-ons, a feature which ended in 1983, later replaced by a center poster which often was a larger print of the cover art.

The original run of CARtoons magazine folded with the August 1991 issue.

In 2015, Ontario artist Marc Methot successfully filed for the abandoned CARtoons trademark. He resumed publication of the magazine in January 2016 and it continues to be published bimonthly.
