= List of people from Santa Monica, California =

This is a list of people from Santa Monica, California.

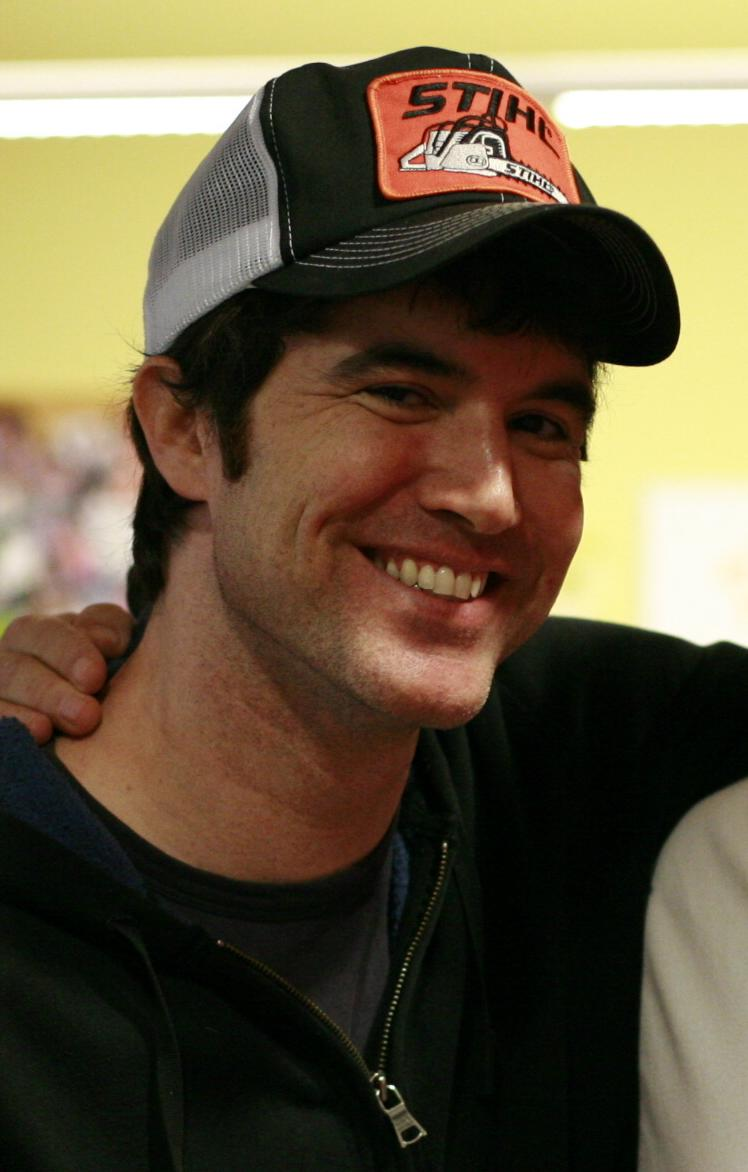
Tom Anderson

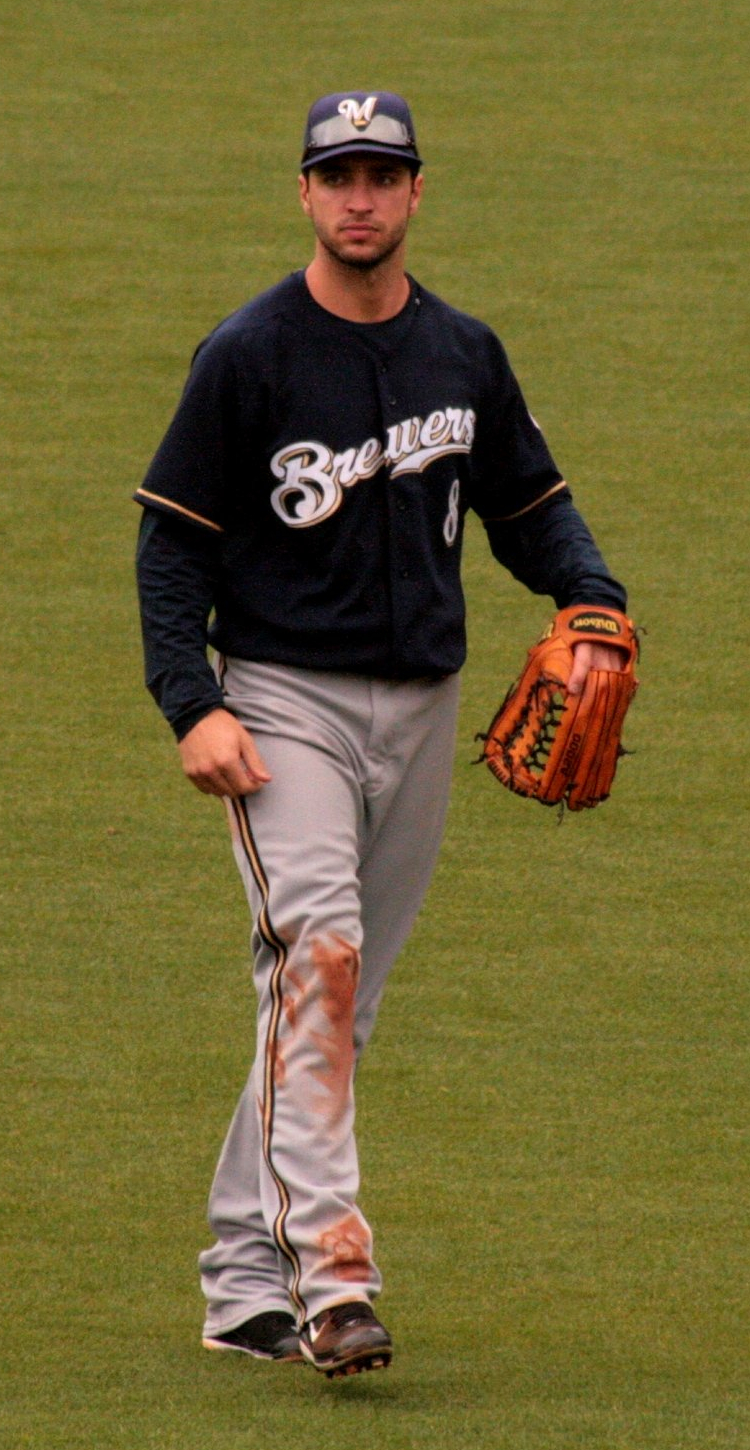
Ryan Braun

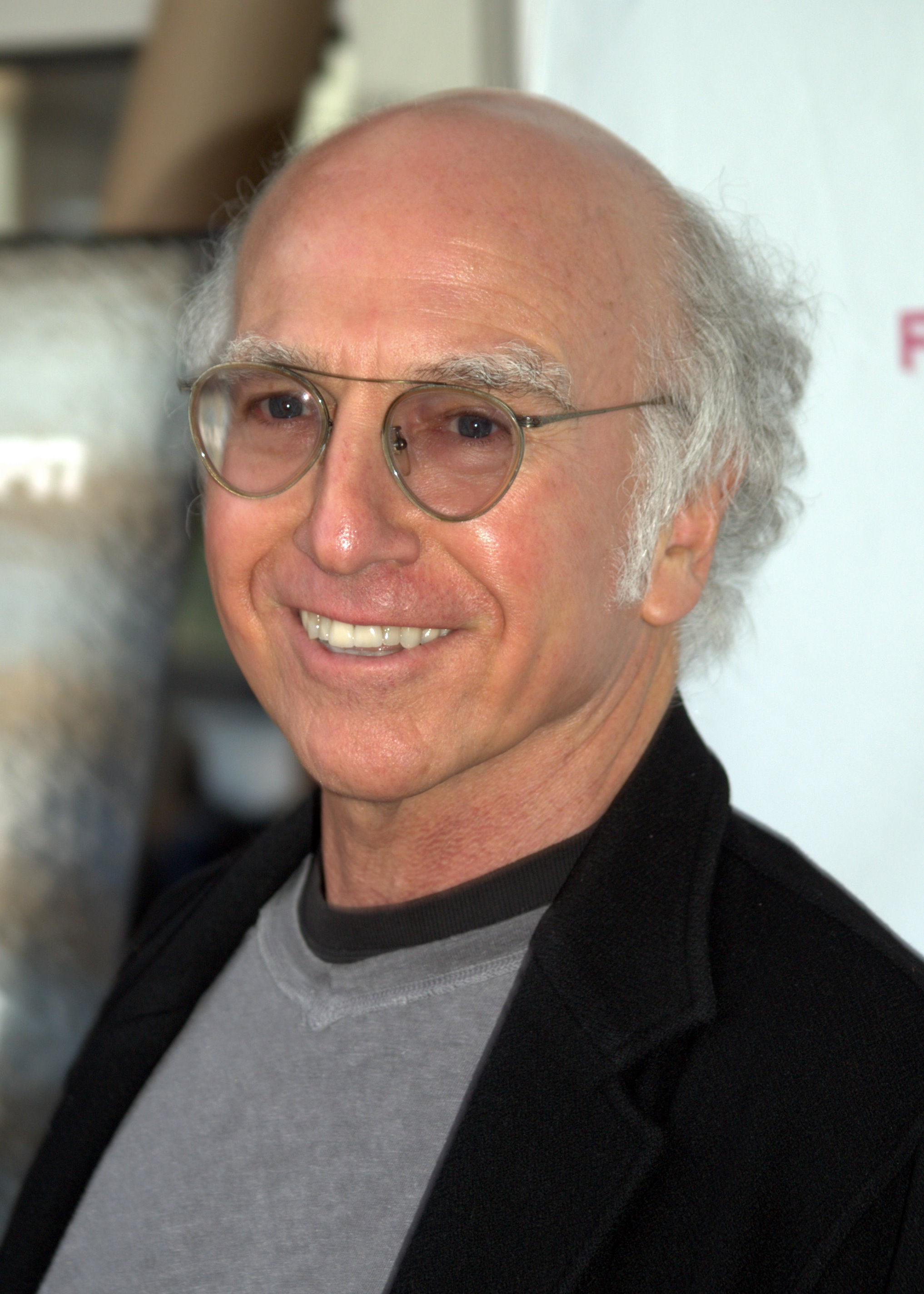
Larry David

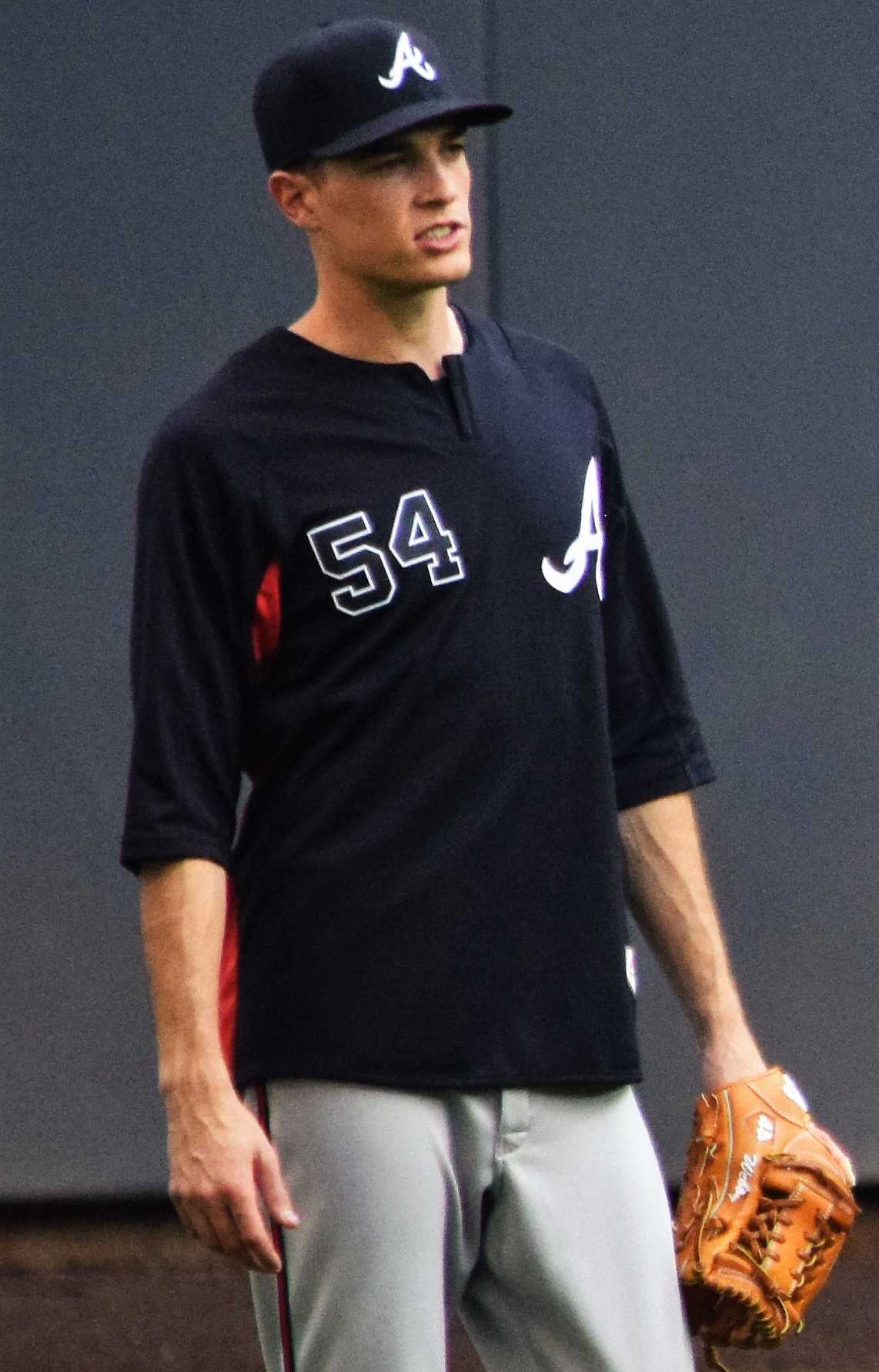
Max Fried

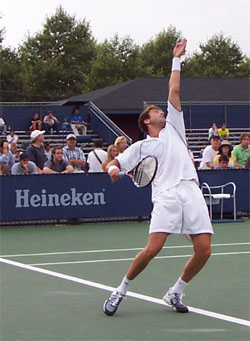
Justin Gimelstob

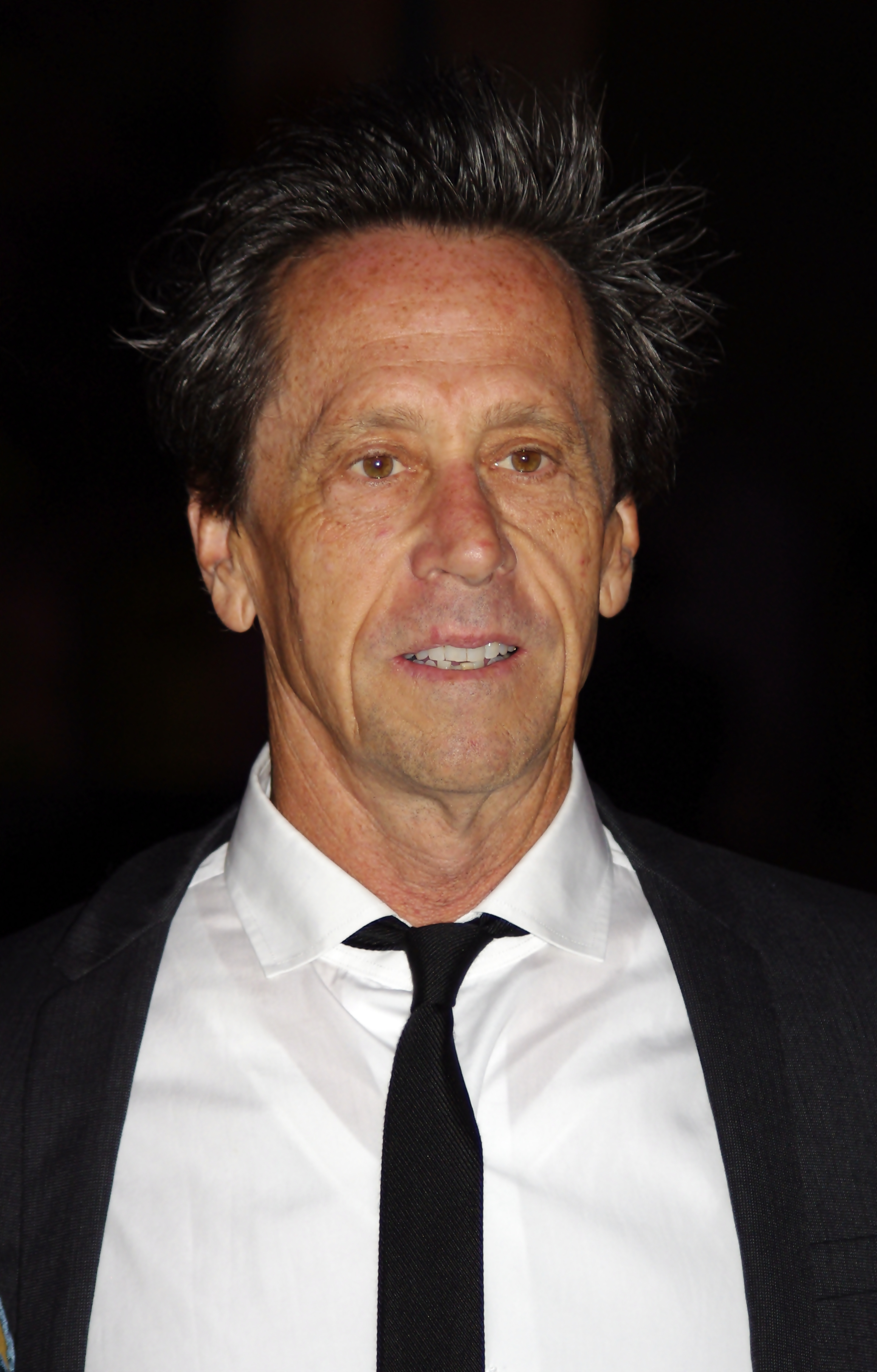
Brian Grazer

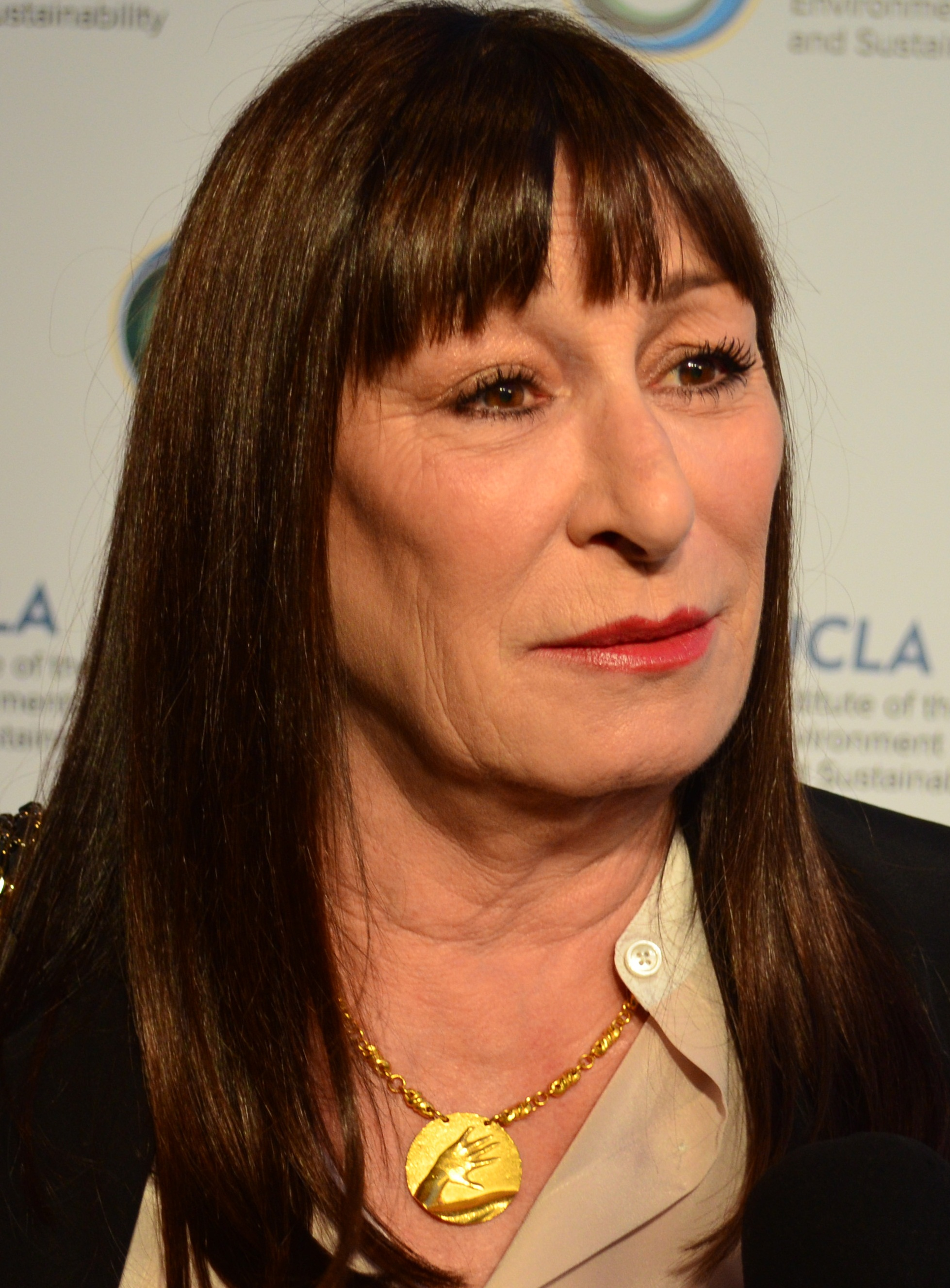
Anjelica Huston

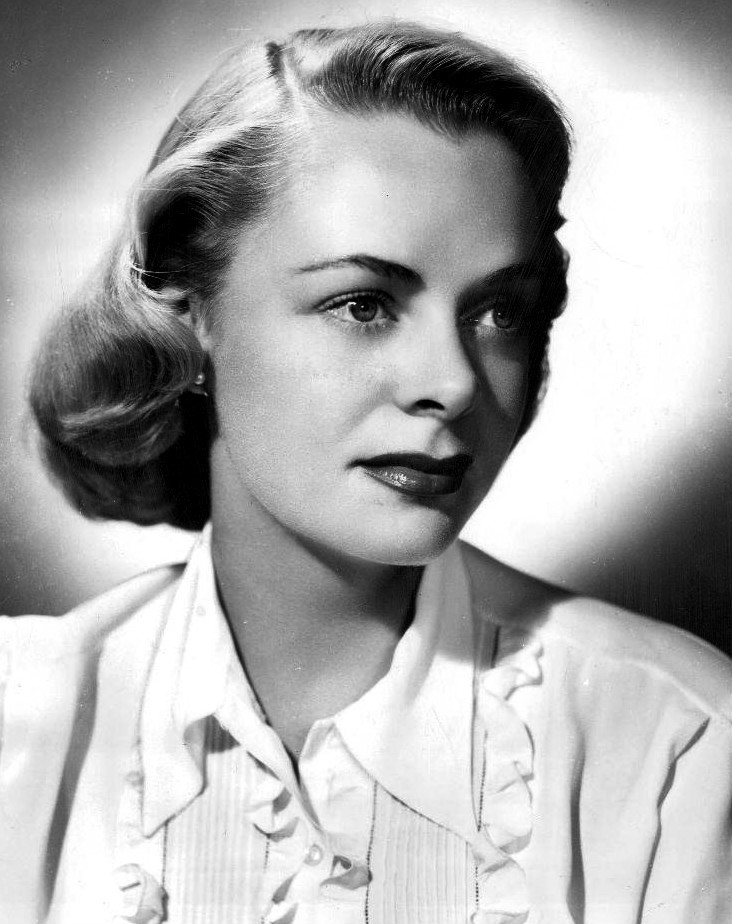
June Lockhart

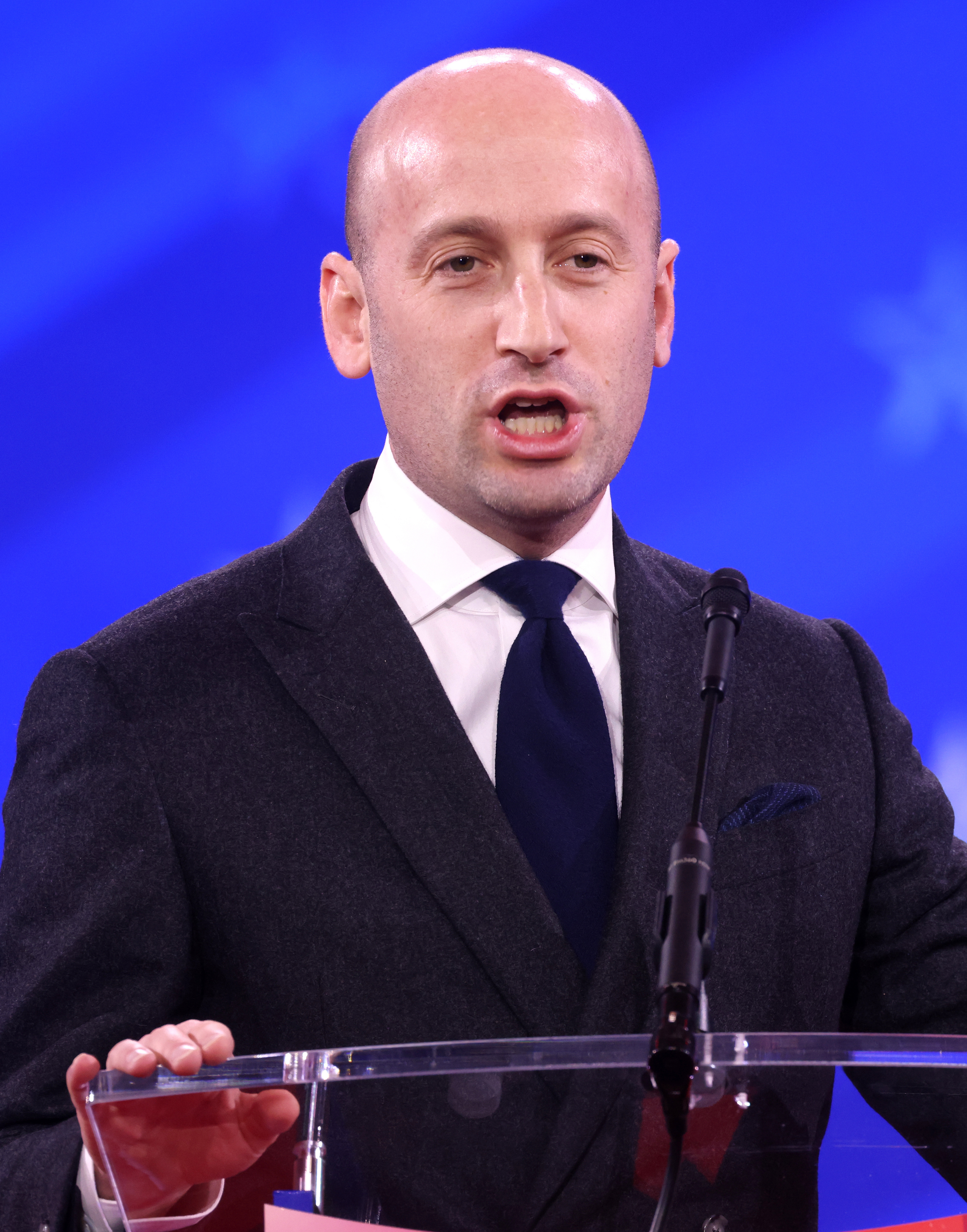
Stephen Miller

- Jay Adams, skateboarder
- Lita Albuquerque, artist and sculptor
- Amy Alcott (born 1956), professional golfer
- Ben Allen (born 1978), attorney and California State Senator
- Rod Allen, TV color commentator for Detroit Tigers (Fox Sports Detroit)
- Tony Alva, skateboarder
- Tiffanie Anderson, singer
- Tom Anderson, founder of MySpace
- Warner Anderson, actor on The Lineup
- Aubrey Anderson-Emmons (born 2007), child actress
- Kenneth Anger, filmmaker and author
- David Anspaugh, film director
- Sean Astin, actor, director, and producer
- Don Bachardy, painter and spouse of Christopher Isherwood
- John Baldessari, artist
- Frank Edmund Beatty, Jr., U.S. Navy vice admiral
- Ashley Bell (born 1986), actress
- Hagy Belzberg (born 1964), Israeli-born American architect
- Sean Berry (born 1966), MLB player for five teams
- Carolyn Beug (1952–2001), filmmaker and video producer
- Big Sean (born 1988), rapper
- Jack Black (born 1969), musician and actor
- Steven Blum, voice actor
- Judy Blumberg, figure skater, U.S. ice dancing champion
- Brennan Boesch, MLB outfielder
- Jeff Bollow, author, filmmaker
- Ryan Braun, MLB outfielder for the Milwaukee Brewers
- Albert Brooks, actor, comedian, director, screenwriter
- Don Burgess (born 1956), cinematographer
- Jeanie Buss, Los Angeles Lakers executive
- Juan José Carrillo, first mayor of Santa Monica, Los Angeles Police Chief, politician, and judge
- George Cates, composer and conductor
- Carly Chaikin, actress
- Geraldine Chaplin, actress
- Buff Cobb, actress, television personality
- Mike Colbern, MLB catcher
- Don Collier, western film and television actor
- Lana Condor, actress
- Nichole Cordova, singer
- Marcia Cross, actress, Desperate Housewives
- Jamie Lee Curtis (born 1958), actress
- Carson Daly, television personality, host of NBC's The Voice and Last Call with Carson Daly
- Larry David (born 1947), actor, screenwriter, producer, Seinfeld, Curb Your Enthusiasm
- Scott Davis (born 1962), tennis player
- Cody Decker (born 1987), MLB player
- Alexis Denisof, actor
- Robert Dollard, first Attorney General of South Dakota
- Troy Donahue, actor
- Dody Dorn, film and sound editor
- Pat Doyle, baseball coach
- Elonka Dunin, game developer
- Dominique Dunne (1959–1982), actress and murder victim
- Thelma "Tiby" Eisen (1922–2014), baseball outfielder
- Jack Engle, hot rodder and custom camshaft grinder, founder of Engle Cams
- Emilio Estevez, actor and director
- Dwight Evans, MLB outfielder
- Shelley Fabares, actress and singer
- Joud Fahmy, Saudi Arabian judoka
- Ed Fallon, Iowa politician
- Miguel Ferrer, actor
- Bobbi Fiedler, congresswoman
- Frank Finch, sportswriter for the Los Angeles Times
- Zack Fleishman, tennis player
- Kai Forbath, NFL kicker
- Will Forte, actor and comedian
- Bonnie Franklin, actress, One Day at a Time
- Max Fried (born 1994), MLB pitcher for the New York Yankees
- Adam Friedland, comedian
- Lynette Fromme, criminal
- John Frusciante, musician, guitarist for Red Hot Chili Peppers
- Helen K. Garber, photographer
- Mick Garris (born 1951), filmmaker and screenwriter
- Frank Gehry, architect
- Frank Gifford, football player and sportscaster
- Sara Gilbert, actress and television personality
- Dan Gilroy, screenwriter and director
- Justin Gimelstob, tennis player and commentator
- Elizabeth Glaser, deceased wife of actor Paul Glaser
- Helen Golay, convicted murderer
- Adam Goldberg, actor
- Ben Gottschalk (born 1992), NFL football center
- Carole Caldwell Graebner, tennis player
- Jennifer Grant, actress and writer
- Linda Gray (born 1940), film, stage and television actress
- Brian Grazer, Oscar-winning film and television producer
- Ashley Grossman (born 1993), world champion water polo player
- Bob Gunton (born 1945), actor
- Paul Haggis, Oscar-winning screenwriter
- Alyson Hannigan, actress
- Mariska Hargitay, actress
- Dan Harrington, poker player
- Horace Heidt, 1940s bandleader
- Julie Heldman (born 1945), tennis player, ranked #5 in the world
- Christy Hemme, professional wrestler for Total Nonstop Action Wrestling
- Derek Hill, racing driver
- Darby Hinton, actor
- Jason Hirsh, MLB pitcher
- Peter Hobbs, actor
- Tony Horton, fitness guru
- Brian Horwitz, MLB outfielder for the San Francisco Giants
- Anjelica Huston (born 1951), Oscar-winning actress
- Christopher Isherwood, author and spouse of Don Bachardy
- Anita Kanter (born 1933), tennis player ranked in World top 10
- Mickey Kaus (born 1951), journalist, pundit, and author
- Weston "Seth" Kelsey (born 1981), three time Olympic fencer
- Tommy Kendall, NASCAR driver
- Cory Kennedy, fashion model
- Riley Keough, actress
- Savy King, soccer player
- Perry Klein (born 1971), NFL quarterback for the Atlanta Falcons
- Apollonia Kotero, actress, model, dancer, and singer
- Lorenzo Lamas, actor
- Andrew Lauer, actor
- Christopher Lawford, actor and author
- Tim Leary, former MLB pitcher
- Jun Hee Lee, actor
- Zander Lehmann (born 1987), tv series creator, writer, and producer
- Shawn Lipman (born 1964), inducted into the US Rugby Hall of Fame
- June Lockhart, actress
- Daniel S. Loeb (born 1961), investor, hedge fund manager, and philanthropist
- Mark Loretta, MLB player
- Kevin Love, NBA player for the Utah Jazz
- Torey Lovullo, Arizona Diamondbacks manager
- Lorna Luft, entertainer
- Dayton Lummis, actor
- Tobey Maguire, actor
- Stephen Malkmus, musician
- Jenna Marbles, comedian
- Teena Marie, singer, songwriter, and producer
- Eli Marienthal, actor (American Pie 1 and 2, The Iron Giant, Confessions of a Teenage Drama Queen)
- Dave Markey, filmmaker and musician
- Dean Paul Martin, musician and actor
- Chris Masters, professional wrestler
- Taylor Mays (born 1988), NFL safety
- Benjamin McKenzie, actor
- Jensen McRae (born 1997), singer-songwriter
- Natalie Mejia, singer
- Kevin Millar, MLB player
- Stephen Miller, political advisor to President Donald Trump
- Rick Monday, MLB outfielder and Dodgers radio broadcaster
- Coco Montoya, blues guitarist, formerly with John Mayall's Bluesbreakers
- Gussie Moran, tennis player
- Jon Moscot, American-Israeli MLB player for the Cincinnati Reds
- John Forbes Nash, Jr., Nobel prize recipient, arrested when lived here, subject of A Beautiful Mind
- Gunnar Nelson, musician
- Tracy Nelson, actress
- Michael Nozik, filmmaker
- Parry O'Brien, two-time Olympic shot put gold medalist
- Susan Olsen, actress
- Douglas F. O'Neill, thoroughbred horse trainer
- Gwyneth Paltrow (born 1972), actress and businesswoman
- Alan Pasqua, jazz musician
- Aaron Paul, actor
- Terren Peizer, businessperson convicted of insider trading and securities fraud
- Chris Penn, actor
- Sean Penn (born 1960), Oscar-winning actor and director
- Phranc (born Susan Gottlieb; 1957), singer-songwriter
- Rob Picciolo, MLB player for the Milwaukee Brewers, California Angels, and Oakland Athletics
- Tyler Posey, actor
- Joshua Prager, physician, leader in field of neuromodulation and Complex Regional Pain Syndrome (CRPS)
- Robert Redford, actor, director, producer, philanthropist
- Randy Rhoads, musician, guitarist for Ozzy Osbourne
- Christina Ricci, actress
- Ashley Roberts, singer
- Ben Levi Ross (born 1998), stage actor and singer
- Erin Sanders, actress
- Chrystina Sayers, singer
- Lawrence Scarpa, architect
- Nicole Scherzinger, singer
- June Schofield, All-American Girls Professional Baseball League player
- Mike Scott, MLB pitcher, Cy Young Award winner
- Sandra Seacat, actor and acting coach
- Roxanne Seeman, songwriter, record producer, theatre producer
- E. C. Segar, cartoonist, creator of Popeye
- Frank Shamrock, mixed martial artist
- Samantha Shapiro, gymnast
- Charlie Sheen (born 1965), actor
- Bobby Sherman, singer and actor
- Bobby Shriver, attorney and politician
- Frank Spellman, Olympic champion weightlifter
- Cole and Dylan Sprouse, actors
- Martin Starr, actor
- Neil Strauss, writer and journalist
- Gloria Stuart, actress and artist
- Jessica Sutta, singer
- Amber Tamblyn, actress
- Shirley Temple, iconic actress and diplomat
- Melody Thornton, singer
- Robert Trujillo, musician, Metallica bassist
- Amber Valletta, model
- Wolfgang Van Halen, rock bassist, son of Eddie Van Halen and nephew of Alex Van Halen
- Leonor Varela, actress and model
- Suzanne Vega (born 1959), songwriter and singer
- Jack Webb, actor, producer and director
- James L. White, screenwriter (Ray)
- Joseph Williams, singer and film score composer
- Anna May Wong, actor
- Alfre Woodard, actress
- Vanness Wu, actor, singer, band member of F4
- Trifun Zivanovic, figure skater
- Ashley Zukerman (born 1983), Australian actor
