= Shawn Kerri =

American cartoonist (born 1958)

- Born: Shawn Maureen Fitzgerald; 1958 (age 67–68) Covina, California
- Areas: Cartoonist, Writer, Artist
- Pseudonym: Dee Lawdid
- Notable works: "Skank Kid", CARtoons

Shawn Kerri (born Shawn Maureen Fitzgerald, 1958) is an American cartoonist who was active in the 1970s and 1980s. She is known for her work as one of the few female contributors to CARtoons Magazine, and as part of the early Southern California punk rock scene, producing iconic images used by the Germs and the Circle Jerks.

== Biography ==
Shawn Maureen Fitzgerald was born in 1958 in Covina, California. Her family then moved to the San Diego area, where she grew up, attending Mission Bay High School.

Her art was influenced by Mad Magazine cartoonists Jack Davis, Will Elder, Wally Wood, and Harvey Kurtzman. As a teenage girl, she was initially turned away when she applied to draw for CARtoons Magazine in 1975, but was hired on the strength of her portfolio of car illustrations. She continued to work for the magazine until it ceased publication in 1991. Between 1978 and 1982 she wrote scripts for Disney's international Donald Duck comics, which were illustrated by Tony Strobl and the Jaime Diaz Studio. She contributed comics to Cracked and pornographic cartoons for Hustler, Chic, Velvet and Gentlemen's Companion under the pen name Dee Lawdid. She also created short comics for Last Gasp's Cocaine Comix and Commies from Mars. She illustrated "Adventures on the Isle of Adolescence", a 1994 spoken-word short film by David Koenigsberg, based on a poem by Pamala Karol ("La Loca"), who narrates.

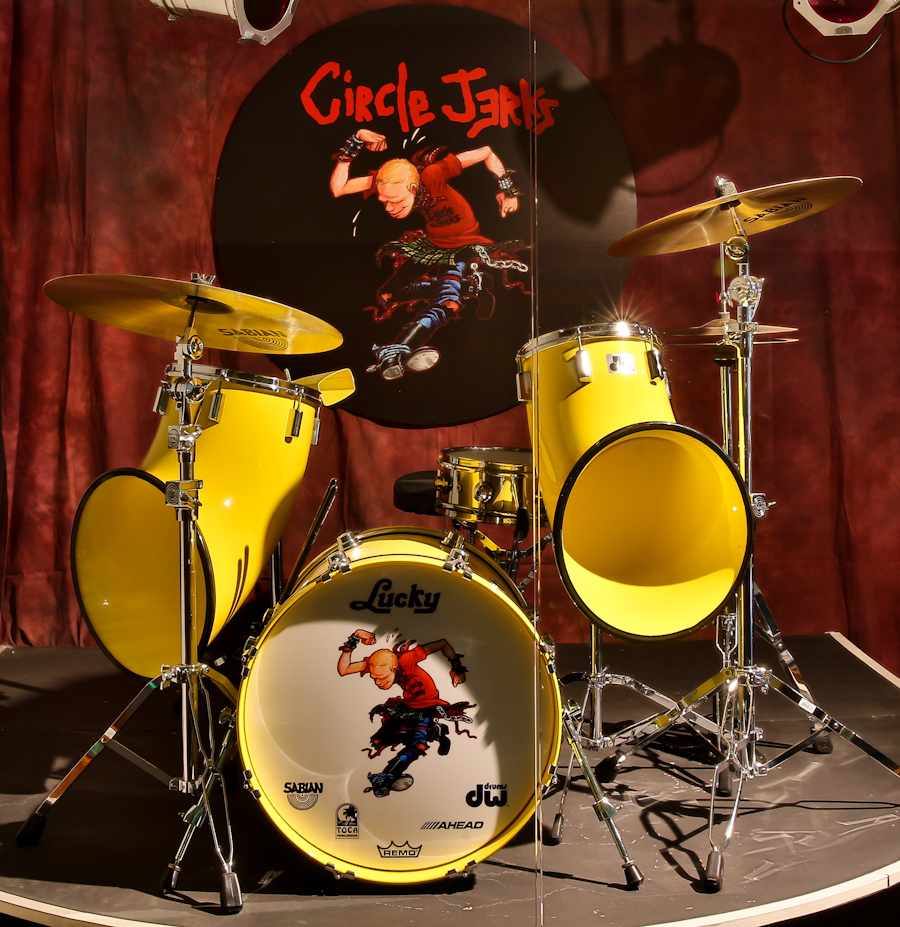
Kerri created the "Skank Kid" character and drew the figure used in the Circle Jerks logo.

Kerri moved to Los Angeles in 1977, and was active in the punk rock scene there in the late 1970s and early 1980s. In 1978, she published a fanzine called Rude Situation, with Mad Marc Rude, who was then her boyfriend. During this period, she drew numerous promotional flyers and tour posters for her friends, which included members of the Germs and the Circle Jerks. One of her best-known images, "Skank Kid" is a composite character of a white teenage punk dancing wildly. He appeared in various comics and illustrations, and was appropriated by the Circle Jerks to be part of the band's logo. Kerri was not paid for this, but reluctantly granted permission to band leader Keith Morris to avoid a legal fight and damaged friendships.

Although there have been conflicting reports that Kerri died in the 1990s, either from a drug overdose, or from falling down stairs at home, documentarian Carl Schneider reported in 2004 that he had found her living with her mother, suffering from chronic cognitive problems following a fall.
