= Street Rod Nationals =

Street rod gathering

The Street Rod Nationals is the world's largest street rod gathering. It is hosted annually by the NSRA (National Street Rod Association). The Street Rod Nationals was first held in 1970 in Illinois and is currently held in Louisville, Kentucky. It has historically been held in a number of cities across the United States such as Columbus, Ohio and Memphis, Tennessee.

The event encompasses a variety of activities aimed at celebrating street rod culture. It acts as a Trade Fair for street rod vendors and an Auto Show for hot rod enthusiasts. All of the cars shown at the event must be at least 30 years old. The Street Rod Nationals also hosts seminars on topics relevant to street rodding. Prize winners are decided based on the overall quality of the vehicles presented including the fit and finish, gaps in the build, interior leather, air conditioning, wheels, chassis and so on.

== History ==
The inaugural Street Rod Nationals took place in 1970 in Peoria, Illinois. The second Street Rod Nationals was co-sponsored by Hot Rod magazine in Memphis, attracting double the attendance of the Peoria meet. The Nationals rotated between several cities in the 1980s and 1990s. It was also held at the Ohio State Fairgrounds in Columbus, Ohio on a three-year cycle numerous times (1978, 1981, 1984, 1987, 1990, 1993, 1996). Currently the event is held in Louisville, Kentucky.

== Attendance, vendors and activities ==
Tens of thousands of spectators attend each year. The event also houses more than 500,000 square feet (46,000 m^{2}) of indoor street rod vendors representing every facet of the automotive hobby, and selling everything needed to build a turn-key street rod. The Street Rod Nationals is viewed as a showcase of street rodding and over 150 new items were introduced there in 2006.

The Street Rod Nationals is known as one of the world's largest automotive participation events with more than 70,000 visitors, and up to 15,000 cars attended the last event, according to the National Street Rod Association.

Seminars are available daily and cover a wide array of topics. Other highlights include the NSRA Safety Inspection Team, street rod scales (courtesy of UPS), "Women's World", 29-Below Shows, a Pro's Pick area, Mopar Country, Commercial Way (hosted by UPS), "Outstanding use of Color" Awards (picked by PPG), games, three entertainment performances, a church service, and "people mover" trams to make traveling the fairgrounds easier.

== See also ==
- List of attractions and events in the Louisville metropolitan area
