= Phil Schilling =

American journalist

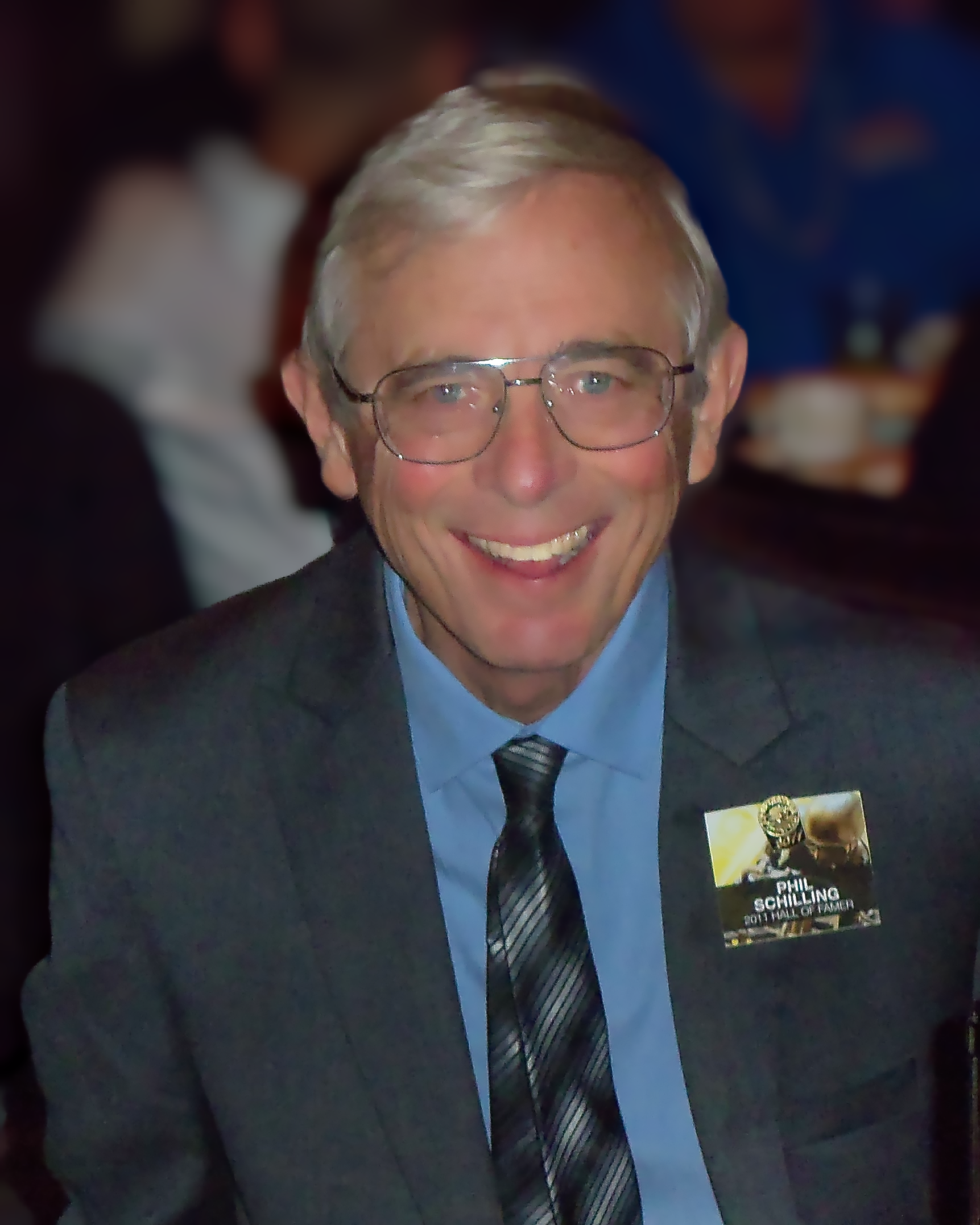
Phil Schilling at 2011 AMA Hall of Fame dinner.

Phil Schilling (January 1, 1940 – May 26, 2015) was an editor at Cycle magazine from 1970 until 1988, including nine years as editor-in-chief. For his contributions to journalism and motorcycle racing, he was inducted to AMA Motorcycle Hall of Fame in 2011 and into the Ducati North America Hall of Fame in 2006. Schilling died in Santa Barbara May 26, 2015.

== Racing ==
In 1977, he helped to create the 750SS that won Ducati's first AMA Superbike title and brought the Ducati marque to the attention of the American public. The process was documented in Cycle's "Racer Road" series.

== Bibliography ==
- Schilling, Phil (1974). The Motorcycle World. Random House. ISBN 0-394-49381-8.
- Schilling, Phil (1975). Knowledge Through Color, Motorcycles (Ridge Press/Bantam Books). Library of Congress Catalog Number 75-517.
- Schilling, Phil (1977). Motorcycles: The World's Greatest Motorcycles in Full Color. (Ridge Press/Bantam Books). ISBN 0-553-11182-5.
