= Safari Press =

Book publishing company

- Founded: 1984
- Country of origin: United States
- Headquarters location: Huntington Beach, California
- Publication types: Books, Magazines
- Official website: safaripress.com

Safari Press is a book publishing company specializing in books on big-game hunting and sporting firearms and is being run by Dr. Jacqueline Neufeld, editor in chief, and Ludo J. Wurfbain, publisher. It is privately owned by a small group of shareholders.

== History ==
The business was started in Seal Beach, California, and remained there until 1990 when it moved to a commercial office and warehouse in Huntington Beach. Initially it occupied one unit in a building, but over time, came to occupy the entire building. In 1992 the business was incorporated as Safari Press Inc.

== World Wide Hunting Books ==
The company started in May 1984 when it issued a small, dark green catalog under the name World Wide Hunting Books. The logo was that of a white rhino on a shield. World Wide Hunting Books sold antiquarian big-game hunting books by issuing a catalog about five times a year. Only in 1985 was the name Safari Press adopted for the new book publishing program. To this day World Wide Hunting Books sells antiquarian books under its name.

== Publications ==
In 1985 Safari Press published its first book, which was a reprint entitled African Hunter by James Mellon. Safari Press used the rhino logo from WWHB. Only one book, African Hunter, was published in 1985, but the next year saw the publication of White Hunter by John Hunter and Horned Death by John Burger. In 1987 the company released five titles including With a Rifle in Mongolia by Count Hoyos-Sprinzenstein, From Mount Kenya to the Cape by Craig Boddington, and Hunting on Three Continents by the late Jack O’Connor, which was a compilation of stories from Petersen’s Hunting magazine. From this small beginning, the company has grown to the point today where it has published over three hundred titles and has over a million copies of its books in print.

Safari Press limited edition books

== Limited editions ==
Safari Press is known for its high-quality limited-edition books. With the exception of three books — White Hunter by John Hunter, Horned Death by John Burger, and After Big Game in Central Africa by Édouard Foà — all its limited-edition books have been original titles not published before in the English language. All its limited edition books are numbered and most have been signed by the author(s). Virtually all limited edition books are issued with a slipcase. Safari Press has now produced more original, limited edition titles than either Amwell Press or the original Derrydale Press.

== Content and merchandise ==
The emphasis of Safari Press has been African big-game hunting from the outset, but by the late 1980s it published its first sporting-firearms book by Craig Boddington, entitled Safari Rifles. From there it branched out to wingshooting, North American and Asian big game, and mountain hunting. As the company grew, it started to carry books published by other companies in addition to its own publications.

Safari Press has adapted and expanded its publishing program to keep up with the changes in technology. It has published audio books as well as e-books. In response to customer demand, it now sells a large variety of hunting DVDs.

In 2002, the owners of Safari Press bought Sports Afield magazine from Robert E. Petersen.
