= National Street Rod Association =

National Street Rod Association Logo

The National Street Rod Association or NSRA is an organization that hosts a number of hot rod and muscle car shows in the United States.

== History ==
The editors of Rod and Custom magazine joined with street-rod clubs across the country to organize the first Street Rod Nationals in Peoria, Illinois, in August 1970, leading to the formation of the NSRA. The NSRA was established as a privately owned corporation based in California. Dick Wells was the first president and CEO. Wells was a partner with Ray Brock in Rod Action, a street-rod publishing venture, and set up the NSRA headquarters office in the magazine's business suite.

By 1973, Wells had set up thirty volunteer state representatives who advised the NSRA headquarters of regulatory developments, and also engaged with local officials and attended public hearings. Impressed by the effectiveness of that system, Specialty Equipment Market Association (SEMA) adopted it in 1975, and also hired Wells away from the NSRA.

The NSRA held firmly to the stance that street rods were strictly vehicles with bodies from 1948 and earlier. As some enthusiasts pushed to include early 1950s vehicles, the NSRA added a street-machine division and added street-machine-only events. In 2010, the NSRA changed its rules to admit cars that are at least 30 years old.

== Shows ==
The shows that are put on by the NSRA are:

- Western Street Rod Nationals, Bakersfield, California
- Street Rod Nationals South, Knoxville, Tennessee
- Mid-America Street Rod Nationals, Springfield, Missouri
- Street Rod Nationals East, York, Pennsylvania
- Rocky Mountain Street Rod Nationals, Pueblo, Colorado
- Mobile Bay Street Rod Nationals, Mobile, Alabama
- Street Rod Nationals, Louisville, Kentucky
- Quad Cities Street Rod Nationals, Davenport, Iowa
- Street Rod Nationals North, Kalamazoo, Michigan
- Northeast Street Rod Nationals, Burlington, Vermont
