= Tom Medley =

American cartoonist

Tom Medley (20 March 1920 - 2 March 2014) was an American hot rodder and cartoonist, best known as creator of Stroker McGurk.

== History ==
Medley was born in Lebanon, Oregon, 20 March 1920. He became interested in auto racing at a young age, and would hitchhike up to 65 mi (105 km) to attend dirt track events.

He served in the U.S. Army's 78th Infantry Division during World War II. After the war ended, he enrolled at California's Art Center School, in Pasadena, California. It was there, like many returning GIs, he became interested in hot rodding.

Medley provided photographic coverage of the land speed racers at Bonneville Speed Weeks, and of the Indianapolis 500, from 1950 to 1964. He began displaying his cartoon creations at a local rod shop, Blair's Speed Shop, which helped get him a job at Hot Rod (when it was still called Honk!) with just its second issue, in February 1948. Medley moved from humor editor to advertising in 1955, and stayed with Petersen Publishing until 1985.

In December 1965, Medley was named publisher of Rod & Custom, which he transformed from a general interest automotive and drag racing magazine (including coverage of karts) to a specialist custom car title. He ran contrary to the trend toward muscle cars and drag racing, and succeeded. Taking that position led to a brief revival of the Stroker McGurk cartoons in the magazine.

== Stroker McGurk ==
Medley's famed creation, Stroker McGurk, debuted in the third issue of Hot Rod (when it was still called Honk!), and continued in the magazine until 1955. He would reappear briefly in 1964 and 1965, and occasionally in Rod & Custom in the 1980s.

Stroker (as he was always known) drove a trademark 1929 Ford roadster in most of his appearances, but he also innovated a number of things later copied by real-life racers, including multiple-engine dragsters, traction bars, and parachutes.

Medley would create an equivalent character, Flat Out Snodgrass, for Cycle.

== Rodding ==
After discussions with Tex Smith, Medley helped organize the first Street Rod Nationals in Peoria, Illinois, in summer 1970.

Medley had a favorite 1940 Ford 5-window, which was destroyed in 2011 in a garage fire; family and friends raised US$30,000 to have the car restored, presenting it to him 10 months later.

He was a long-time friend of customizer Dick "Magoo" Megugorac.

== Personal life ==
Medley had one son, Gary.

He died in Los Angeles on 2 March 2014, after a brief illness, at 93.
