= Jack Engle =

- Nationality: American
- Born: June 16, 1920 Regina, Saskatchewan, Canada
- Died: November 14, 2008 (aged 88) Santa Monica, California, U.S.

Jack Engle (June 16, 1920 – November 14, 2008) was a Canadian-born American hot rodder, camshaft grinder, and engine builder.

== History ==
Engle was born in Regina, Saskatchewan in 1920, to parents who were American citizens. He was an only child. His father, Ed Engle a construction contractor, moved the family to Santa Monica, California, a few years later. Engle attended Venice High School, then Santa Monica City College.

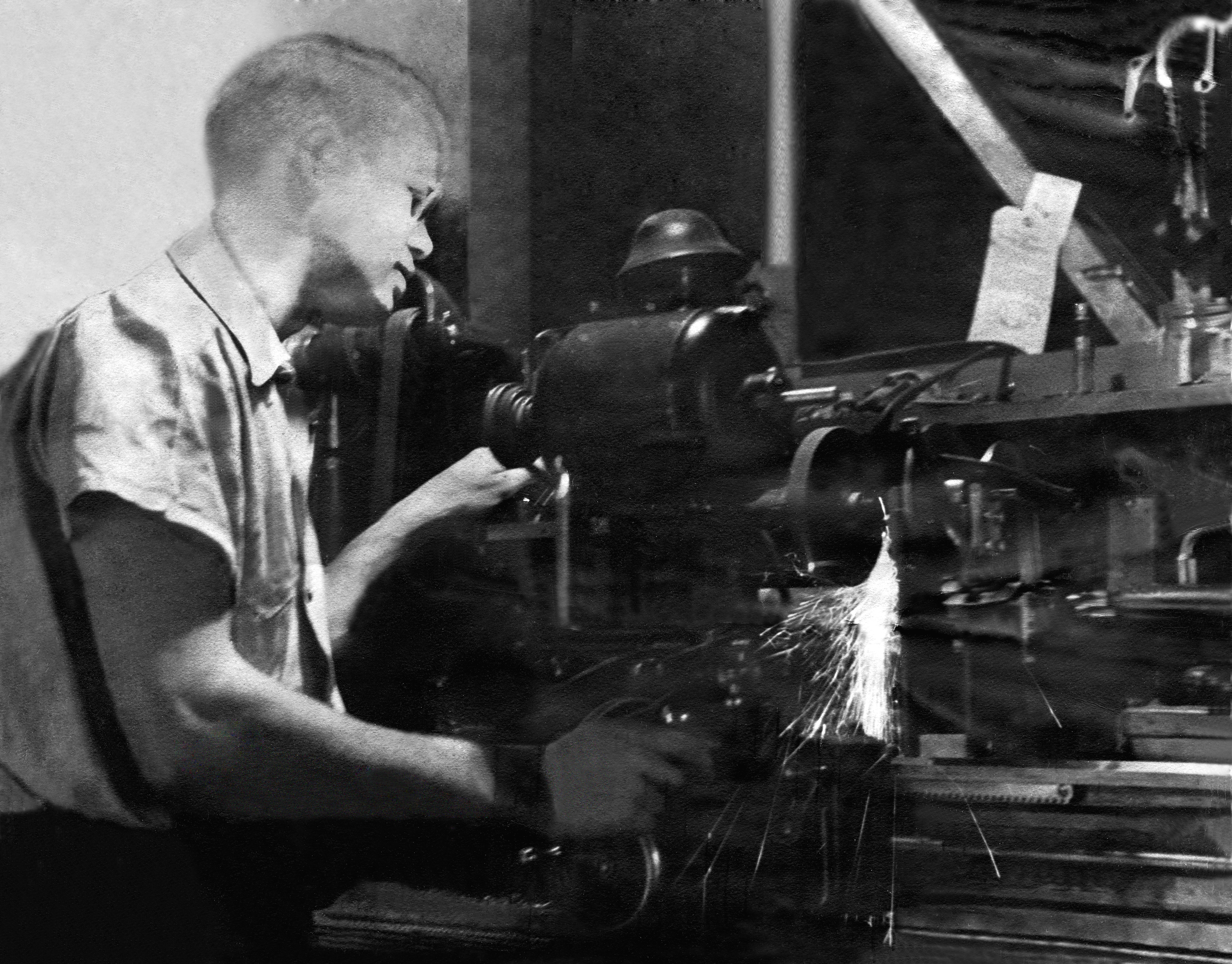

Engle's first car was a 1926 Chevrolet, fitted with an Oldsmobile cylinder head (a simple, common conversion at the time), which he bought in 1937. He went to work for North American Aviation as a machinist, and was drafted into the United States Navy, where he did maintenance work on the Packard 4M-2500 engines of PT boats, aboard a PT boat tender in the Philippine Islands. In 1941 Jack had a Model A on T rails with a Cragar headed 4 cyl supercharged B engine that he went 113 MPH and 7.9 seconds in the flying quarter mile 1 week before Pearl Harbor attack. Jack also made a cam grinder from a bench top lathe, a tool post grinder and a home made rocking table where he started grinding cams in 1941 before the war in his father's garage located in Venice CA.

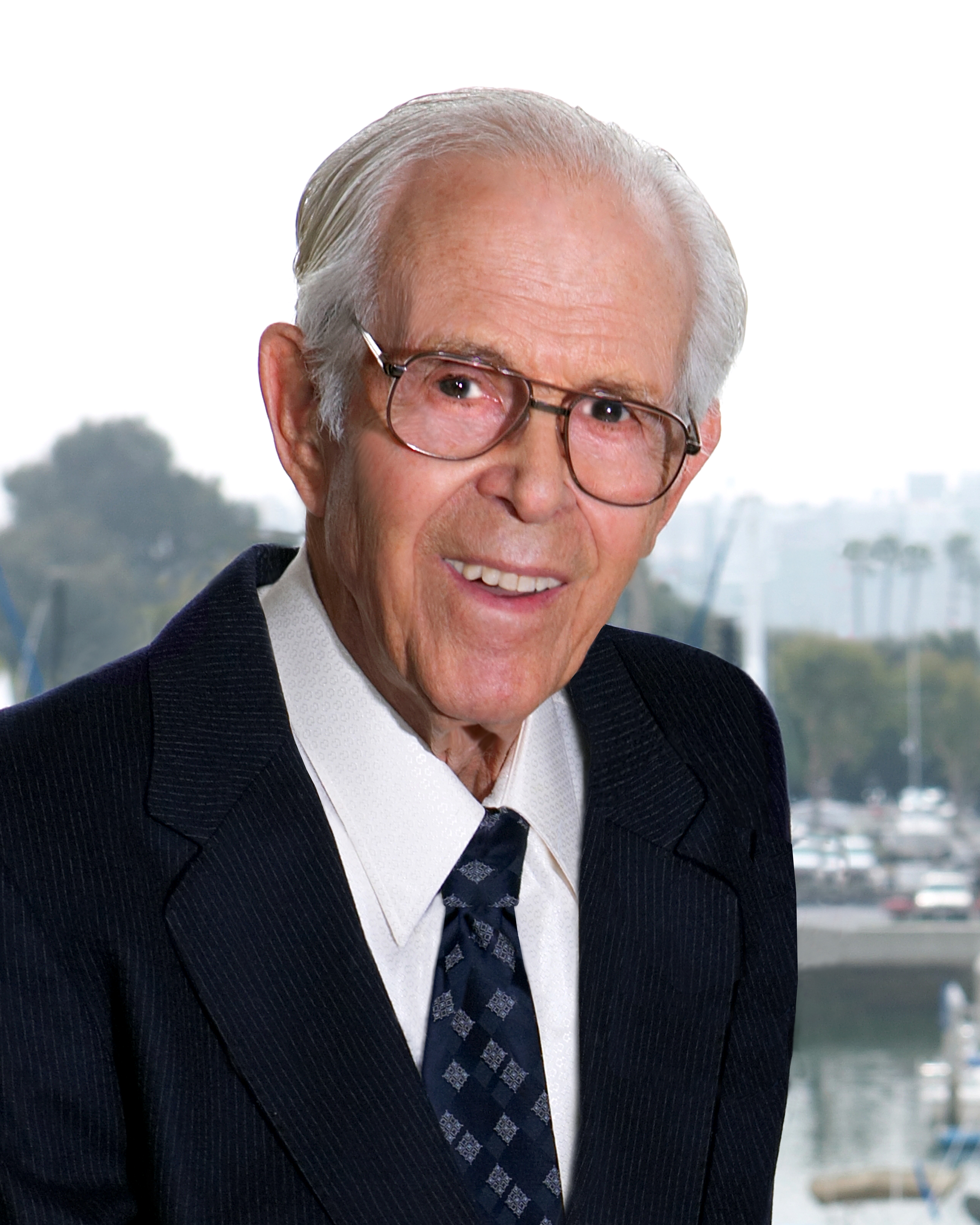

When the war ended, he went back to NAA, but developed a sideline. By 1947, Engle was setting out on his own. working on car engines opening an engine machine shop in the back of his fathers Radio/TV store in Santa Monica. Starting with those of fellow members of his Santa Monica car club, the Low Flyers, which included Stu Hilborn (Hilborn Fuel Injection). Jim Travers, Frank Coon (Traco) Phil Remington (Shelby, All American Racers) Howard Wilson, and dozens more. Jack bought a Landis cam grinding machine and his experimentation led to the cam interest overtaking the engine machine shop services, so he evolved into Engle Racing Cams 1950. Jack was able to grind cams for Oldsmobiles that would out run the Chryslers on the dragstrip which really put him on the map, Engle became one of the premiere go to cam grinders and was involved throughout his lifetime in development of all things related to making power, from everything automotive, marine, even aircraft. Countless records, championships, and milestones were made using Jack Engle's camshafts and components.

By 2004, Engle was semi-retired, still living in Santa Monica, leaving his sons to make most of the business decisions.

== Private life ==
In 1949, Engle married a local waitress named Ona, who worked across the street from his shop. He has two sons: Doug, and Mark. They ran Engle Cams until 2009 when the business was sold.
