= Robert E. Petersen =

American publisher (1926–2007)

- Born: Robert Einar Petersen; September 10, 1926; East Los Angeles, California, U.S.
- Died: March 23, 2007 (aged 80); Santa Monica, California, U.S.
- Education: Barstow High School
- Occupations: Publisher, philanthropist
- Known for: Petersen Publishing Company: Hot Rod, Car Craft, Motor Trend, CARtoons, Guns & Ammo, SPORT, Motorcyclist, Teen, Tiger Beat, Sassy Magazine
- Spouse: Margie McNally (m. 1963)
- Children: 2

Robert Einar "Pete" Petersen (September 10, 1926 – March 23, 2007) was an American publisher who founded the Petersen Automotive Museum in 1994.

== Early life ==
Petersen was born on September 10, 1926, in East Los Angeles, California. He was of Danish descent. He learned about cars from helping his father, a truck mechanic. After graduating from Barstow High School, he served in the Army Air Corps in World War II.

== Career ==
After the war, Petersen left Barstow, California, for Los Angeles and found work at Metro-Goldwyn-Mayer (MGM), becoming a publicist there within a year.

After being laid off during staff cuts, Petersen and other ex-MGM staff started Hollywood Publicity Associates, a consulting firm. In the summer of 1947, the company was commissioned to publicize an exhibition of hot rods held the following winter. While working to promote the exhibition, Petersen realized that there were no media specific to hot rods or hot-rodding. Seeing an opportunity, Petersen and Robert Lindsay, another member of the promotion team for the exhibition, left Hollywood Publicity Associates that autumn and began development of Hot Rod magazine. The first issue of the magazine, with a run of 5,000 copies, was released to coincide with the Los Angeles Hot Rod Exhibition, the show Petersen and Lindsay were initially contracted to publicize. The founders sold the copies of the magazine at the steps of the exhibition. After a successful debut, the magazine continued to sell out and grow in readership. By mid-1949, monthly sales exceeded 50,000 copies.

Starting from this, Petersen built his publishing empire on automotive-themed publications, including Car Craft, Rod & Custom, Sports Car Graphic, and Motor Trend. He also published CARtoons, Guns & Ammo, SPORT, Motorcyclist, Motor Life, Hunting, Mountain Biker, Photographic, Teen, Tiger Beat, and Sassy Magazine, 4 Wheel and Off Road

In 1996, Petersen sold his company Petersen Publishing Company to a private equity fund for $450 million which, in 1999, sold it for $2 billion to publisher EMAP. In 2001 it was sold to Primedia (now Rent Group). In 2007 Primedia's enthusiast publications, including all the once-Petersen titles, were again sold to Source Interlink, controlled by Ron Burkle. In 1999 Petersen bought Sports Afield from Hearst Corporation and he sold it in 2002 to the owners of Safari Press.

== Collections ==
Petersen participated in hunting and collecting, and acquired a collection including various antique and modern firearms. Following Petersen's death, in following with his wishes, Petersen's widow donated a 400-piece portion of his collection to the National Rifle Association's National Firearms Museum in Fairfax, VA. Among his collection the work of firearm engraver Richard Roy of Connecticut Shotgun are displayed. In addition, he is the owner of the only three Parker Invincibles ever produced by Parker Bros.

== Personal life ==
He married Margie McNally in 1963 and had two sons who died in a 1975 plane crash. They resided in a mansion located at 625 Mountain Drive in Beverly Hills, California, formerly owned by actors Harry Joe Brown and Sally Eilers. It was designed by architect Paul R. Williams and built from 1937 to 1938.

== Death ==
Petersen died of complications from neuroendocrine cancer on March 23, 2007 at St. John's Health Center in Santa Monica, California. Margie Petersen died on November 25, 2011.

== Awards ==
He was inducted into the Motorsports Hall of Fame of America in 2013.
