= Stroker McGurk =

Stroker McGurk is a cartoon character created by Tom Medley, featured in Hot Rod and Rod & Custom.

Medley's famed creation debuted in the third issue of Hot Rod, and continued in the magazine until 1955. He would reappear briefly in 1964 and 1965, and occasionally in Rod & Custom in the 1980s.

Stroker (as he was always known) drove a trademark 1929 Ford roadster in most of his appearances, but also innovated a number of things later copied by real-life racers, including multiple-engine dragsters, traction bars, and parachutes.
