= Hot Rod (magazine) =

American car magazine

- Cover of the Fall 2024 issue
- Editor: John McGann
- Former contributors: Wes Allison, Larry Chen, Elana Scherr, Mike Finnegan, Brandan Gillogly, Phillip Thomas
- Former editors: Wally Parks, Rob Kinnan, David Freiburger, David Kennedy, Evan Perkins, Johnny Hunkins
- Categories: Automobile magazine
- Frequency: Quarterly
- Total circulation: 385,333 (June 2021)
- Founder: Robert Petersen
- Founded: 1948
- First issue: January 1948
- Company: Motor Trend Group (Hearst Communications)
- Country: US
- Based in: El Segundo, California
- Language: English
- Website: www.hotrod.com
- ISSN: 0018-6031

Hot Rod is an American car magazine devoted to hot rodding, drag racing, and muscle cars—modifying automobiles for performance and appearance. It was published monthly until 2024, when it transitioned to quarterly publication.

== History ==
Hot Rod is the oldest magazine devoted to hot rodding, having been published since January 1948. Robert E. Petersen founded the magazine and his Petersen Publishing Company was the original publisher. The first editor of Hot Rod was Wally Parks, who went on to found the National Hot Rod Association (NHRA). Petersen Publishing was sold to British publisher EMAP in 1998, who then sold the former Petersen magazines to Primedia (now Rent Group) in 2001. Today, it was published by Motor Trend Group, formerly known as TEN: The Enthusiast Network and Source Interlink Media. Source Interlink acquired the magazine along with Primedia's Consumer Magazine division in 2007.

In December 2024, Hearst Communications acquired Motor Trend Group and most of its assets including Hot Rod from Warner Bros. Discovery.

Hot Rod has a strategic relationship with Universal Technical Institute, referring to UTI as its sponsor.

In March 1948, Hot Rod published the first appearance of Tom Medley's cartoon hot rodder, Stroker McGurk. The feature would survive until 1955.

== Sponsored events ==
Between 1961 and 1969, the Hot Rod Magazine Championship Drag Races, "one of the most significant drag racing events" of that era, were hosted by the magazine at Riverside Raceway. The championship offered a US$37,000 prize, greater even than a National Hot Rod Association national event prize at the time.

The "Hot Rod Power Tour" is an organized tour where hot rodders drive a pre-planned route throughout the United States. It began in 1995 when Hot Rod staff members decided to take some of their project cars on a cross-country drive from Los Angeles, California to Norwalk, Ohio. Thousands of people participated along the way but only seven participants (other than staff members) made the entire journey and were inducted into the original "Long Hauler Gang". It is typically six to eight days in length and held in late May or early June. In recent years, the tour has evolved to become what is essentially a continuous trek around the United States in that it begins in or near the location that it ended in the previous year. Each stop is combined with varied events or activities.

The starting points can change from year to year on the power tour. Tour Stops along the way on the power tour often feature entertainment, celebrities, contests, and games.

== Video games ==
Burnout: Championship Drag Racing (1998) was licensed by Hot Rod. ValuSoft has published Hot Rod: American Street Drag and Hot Rod: Garage to Glory, drag racing video games in which the goal is to win the cover feature of Hot Rod magazine.
