= CadZZilla =

Customized 1948 Cadillac

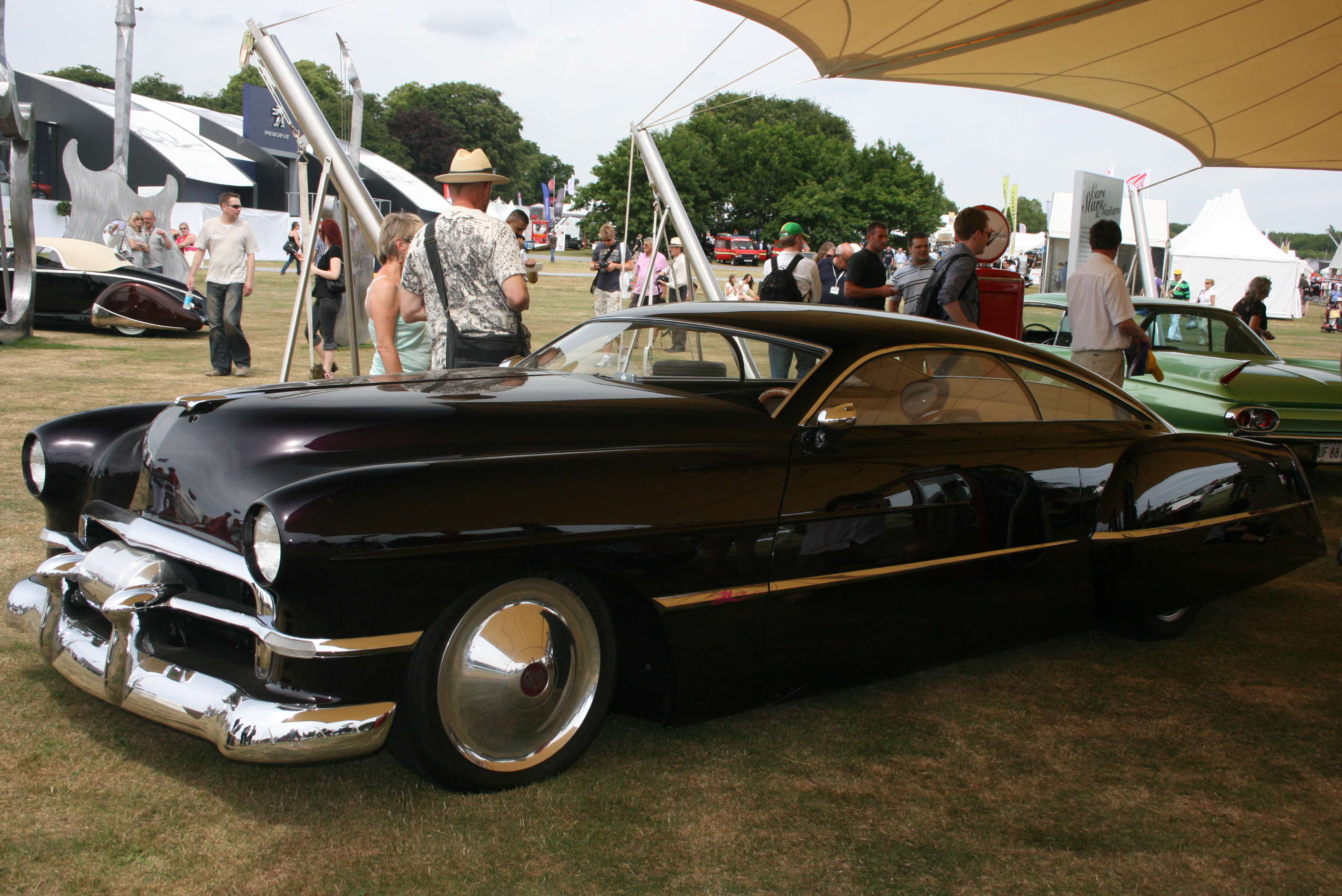

CadZZilla is a custom car built by Boyd Coddington for Billy Gibbons of ZZ Top.

== History ==
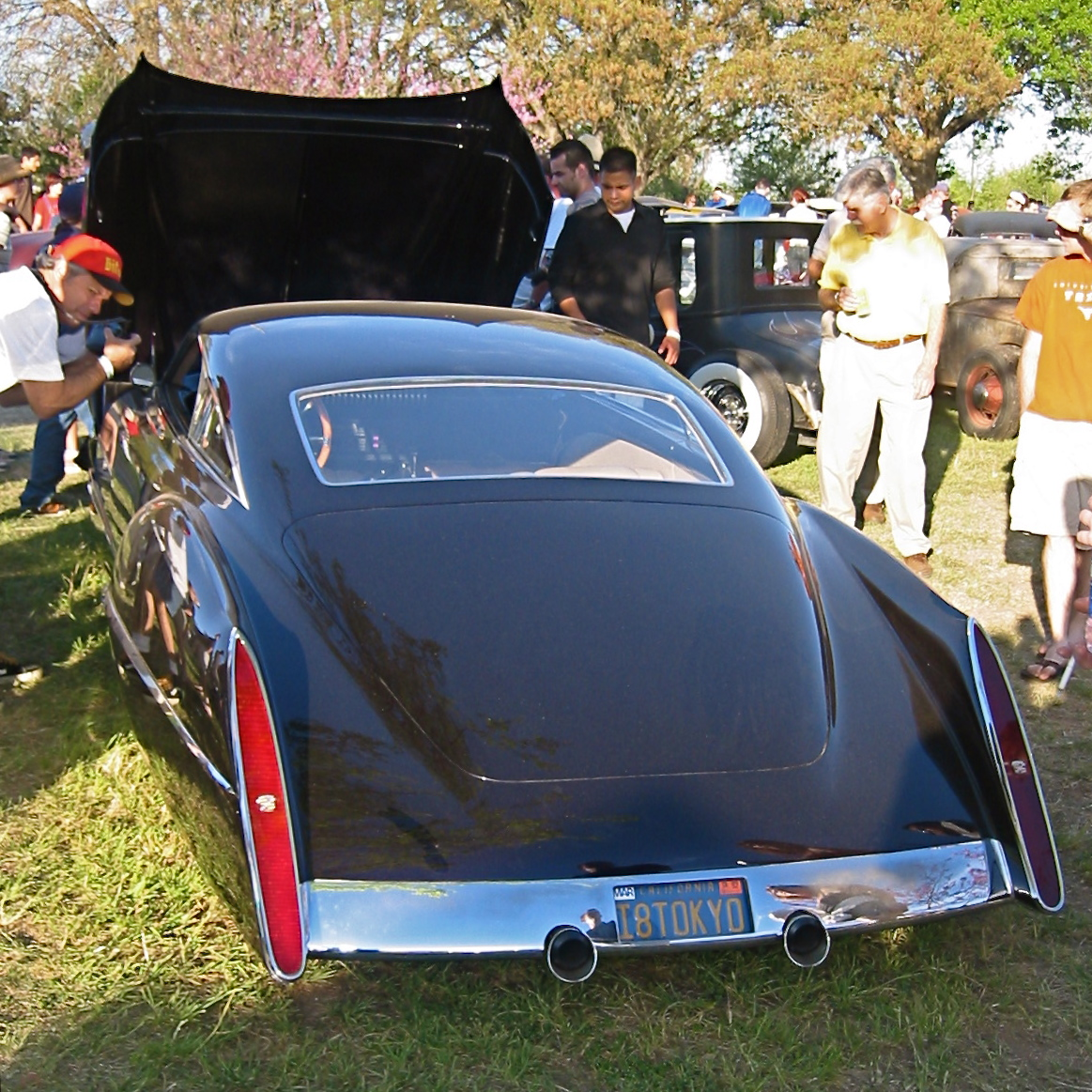

Conceived in 1989, CadZZilla is a customized Cadillac, built for Billy Gibbons of ZZ Top. The car's appearance was designed by Jack Chisenhall and Larry Erickson. It is acclaimed as one of the great expressions of automotive customization. Drawing inspiration from the lead sleds and Mercury Eights of the 1950s, CadZZilla attracted considerable attention. Hot Rod magazine's Gray Baskerville called CadZZilla "the most incredible transformation he'd ever witnessed", and in their "History of Hot Rods & Customs" the auto editors of Consumer Guide praised it as "the first really new type of custom since the heyday of the 1950s". Coddington's team, led by body man Craig Naff, started with a 1948 Cadillac Series 62 Sedanette. The first sketches were done on a bar napkin. Initially set to feature simple customizations, the vehicle's design was instead radically altered upon Gibbons' request.

== Customizations ==
The top was chopped. The hood and front fenders were sectioned and combined into a tilt nose. Headlights were frenched and late-model Cadillac taillights frenched into the rear fins. The front bumper was fitted with high-mounted dagmars, with a Moon tank between them in the grille opening. The engine is a 500 cu in (8 L) Cadillac V8 with custom-built Holley fuel injection, mated to a Currie 9-inch (23 cm) rear axle. The exhaust pipes exit through the rear bumper. Springs are Koni coilovers, with a steering box from a 1985 Corvette. The wheels are a 22 in (560 mm)-diameter billet aluminum design by Coddington. The exterior was finished in deep purple from House of Kolor.

CadZZilla cost Gibbons about US$900,000.
