= Hirohata Merc =

1950s lead sled custom car

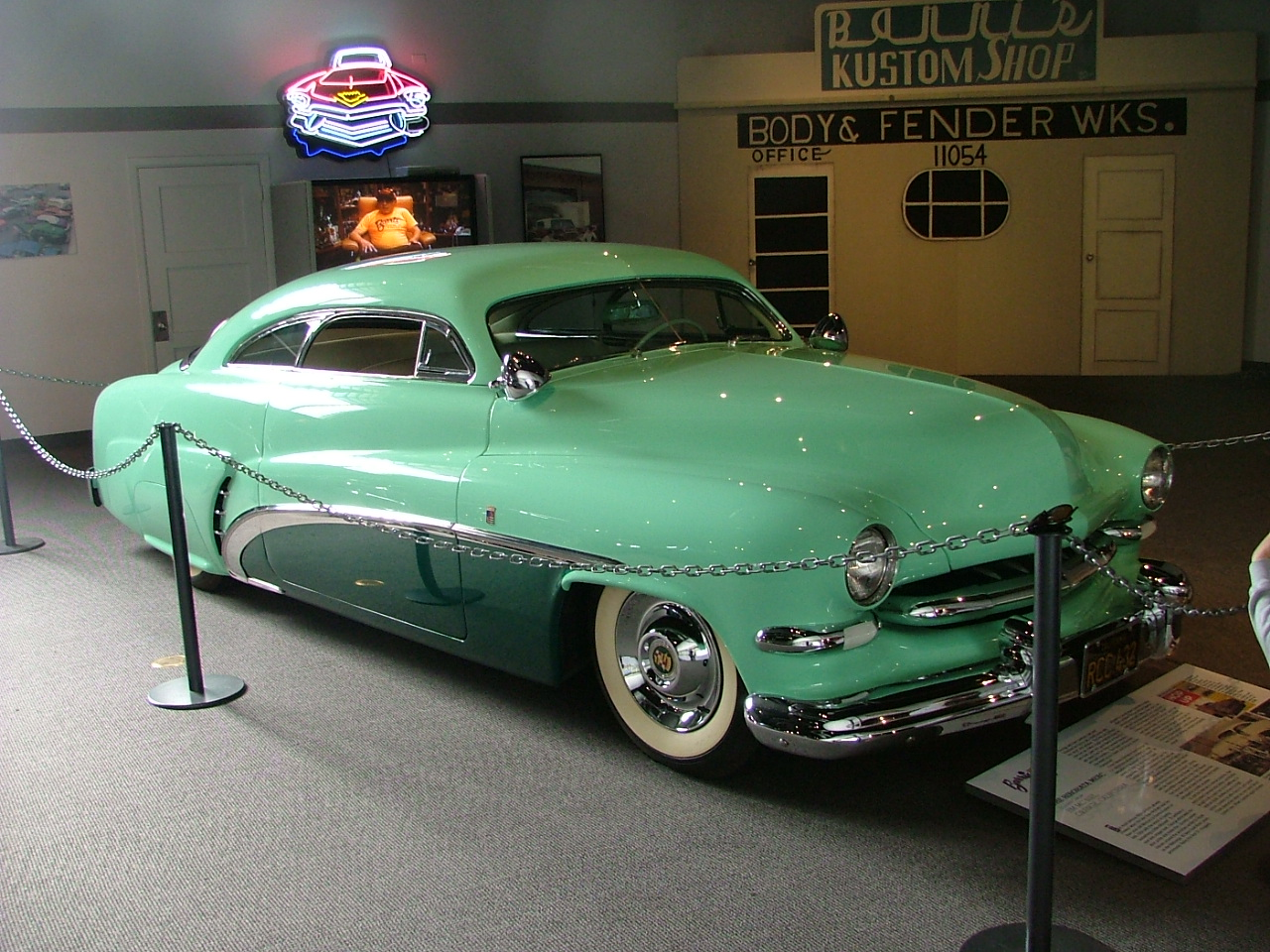
- The Merc on display at the NHRA Museum in 2007

Overview
- Manufacturer: Barris Customs
- Production: 1953
- Designer: George and Sam Barris

Body and chassis
- Body style: Club Coupe
- Layout: Front Engine, RWD

Powertrain
- Engine: Heavily Modified 255 cu in (4,184 cc) Mercury flathead engine
- Power output: 400 hp (298 kW) @ 3,600 rpm 310 lb⋅ft (420 N⋅m) @ 2,000 rpm
- Transmission: 3-speed Auto

Dimensions
- Wheelbase: 2,997.2 mm (118 in)
- Length: 4,877 mm (192.0 in)
- Width: 1,953.3 mm (76.9 in)
- Height: 1,572.3 mm (61.9 in)
- Curb weight: 3,175 lb (1,440 kg)

The Hirohata Merc is a 1950s lead sled custom car, often called "the most famous custom of the classic era". Setting a style and an attitude, it had a "momentous effect" on custom car builders, appeared in several magazines at the time, and has reappeared numerous times since, earning an honorable mention on Rod & Custom's "Twenty Best of All Time" list in 1991. The impact may be measured by the fact that, after more than fifty years and numerous owners, it is still known as "the Hirohata Merc".

== Construction ==
Constructed in 1953 for "Bob" (Robert Masato) Hirohata, it was designed and built by George and Sam Barris, assisted by Frank Sonzogni.

After the U.S. Navy, Hirohata took a 1951 Mercury Club Coupé and a blank check to Barris Kustoms. George Barris procrastinated 83 days, working on other cars, Hirohata demanded the finished car for Motorama, so the shop built the Hirohata Merc in only 14 very long days, with 10 workers. George Barris said he billed Hirohata "about $3,500" ($36,500 in 2021 dollars). Hirohata told Rod & Custom that he was shocked when he got the bill, "I had to sell everything I owned and put my great aunt in hock to pay for the car, but it was worth it."

It started out as a 1951 Club Coupe. Nosed, decked, and shaved, the top was chopped four inches in front and seven inches in back, and the vertical B-pillar was reshaped so that it curved forward at the top. The rear window had its posts removed, and was raked steeply forward, requiring a new roof piece to be fabricated. Side trim was replaced with that from a 1952 Buick (the spears), augmented by grille teeth from a 1952 Chevrolet (three per side) and functional scoops. The front wheels are fitted with traditional sombrero ('47-'51 Cadillac) wheel covers.

Skirts were added, fitting flush. Three '51 Ford grilles were used to custom-fabricate one, and the bumper was fitted with dagmars.

Barris used a vee-butted windshield, a very common customizers' trick in that era, rather than a one-piece windshield, which was available on the '53 Merc. He added Appleton spotlights, frenched the headlights (which were fitted with '52 Ford rings), and added '52 Lincoln Capri taillights. The exhaust pipes were routed out through the rear bumper, beneath the taillights, and a pair of radio antennae were frenched into the rear quarter panels.

The Hirohata Merc was painted in two shades of green, a total of thirty coats, which were applied by Junior Conway. The interior was upholstered with tuck-and-rolled naugahyde. The dash, seats, and headliner were white with dark green inserts, matching the exterior lower body color (below the Buick spears).

== Later changes ==
Hirohata later replaced the original Mercury flathead engine with a transplanted Cadillac engine, creating the nickname "Mercillac" ("merk-ill-ack"), in the fashion of rodders of the period, who in the same way created Fordillacs and Studillacs.

In 1955, the Merc made an appearance in the film Running Wild, for which it was painted gold over the original ice green.

Hirohata sold the Merc not long after the movie was released, and the car changed hands several times. "The Merc was repainted, sold, crashed, neglected".

An owner, Robert Waldsmith, who used it as his daily transportation, was hit by another car, requiring repairs and new paint. Another owner, Doug Kinney, was an employee of Ed "Big Daddy" Roth, who repainted it lime green.

In 1959, a teenager, Jim McNiel, bought it for $500, painstakingly restored it for seven years and kept the car his whole life. McNiel used it as a daily driver for years, then placed it into storage. Ultimately, McNiel restored the Merc to her original configuration. The paint was done by Hershel "Junior" Conway at Junior's House of Color.

== Magazine appearances ==
- Hop Up March 1953
- Hot Rod March 1953
- Motor Trend March 1953
- Rod & Custom October 1953 "Kross Kountry in a Kustom"
- Trend Book 109 Custom Cars 1954 Annual
- Rodding and Re-styling January 1956
- Trend Book 143 Restyle Your Car
- Rod & Custom August 1989
- Road & Track August 2004
- Trend Book 133 Custom Cars 1957 Annual
- The Big Book of Barris

== See also ==
- Automotive restoration
- Kustom (cars)
- Lead sled
- Von Dutch
