= List of automotive packages =

An automotive package is a collection of cosmetic or functional additions to a vehicle that are marketed and sold as a group. Such packages often represent a substantial portion of the profit on a vehicle. Over time, many of the features in a package may be incorporated into the base vehicle as costs are driven down through manufacturing experience, design refinement, materials substitution, and economies of scale.

- Car model
- Automotive trim nomenclature
- Handling package
- Navigation package
- Performance package
- Safety package
- Sports package
- Trim package (sometimes as appearance package)
