= Lead sled =

Automobile with lead used in the body

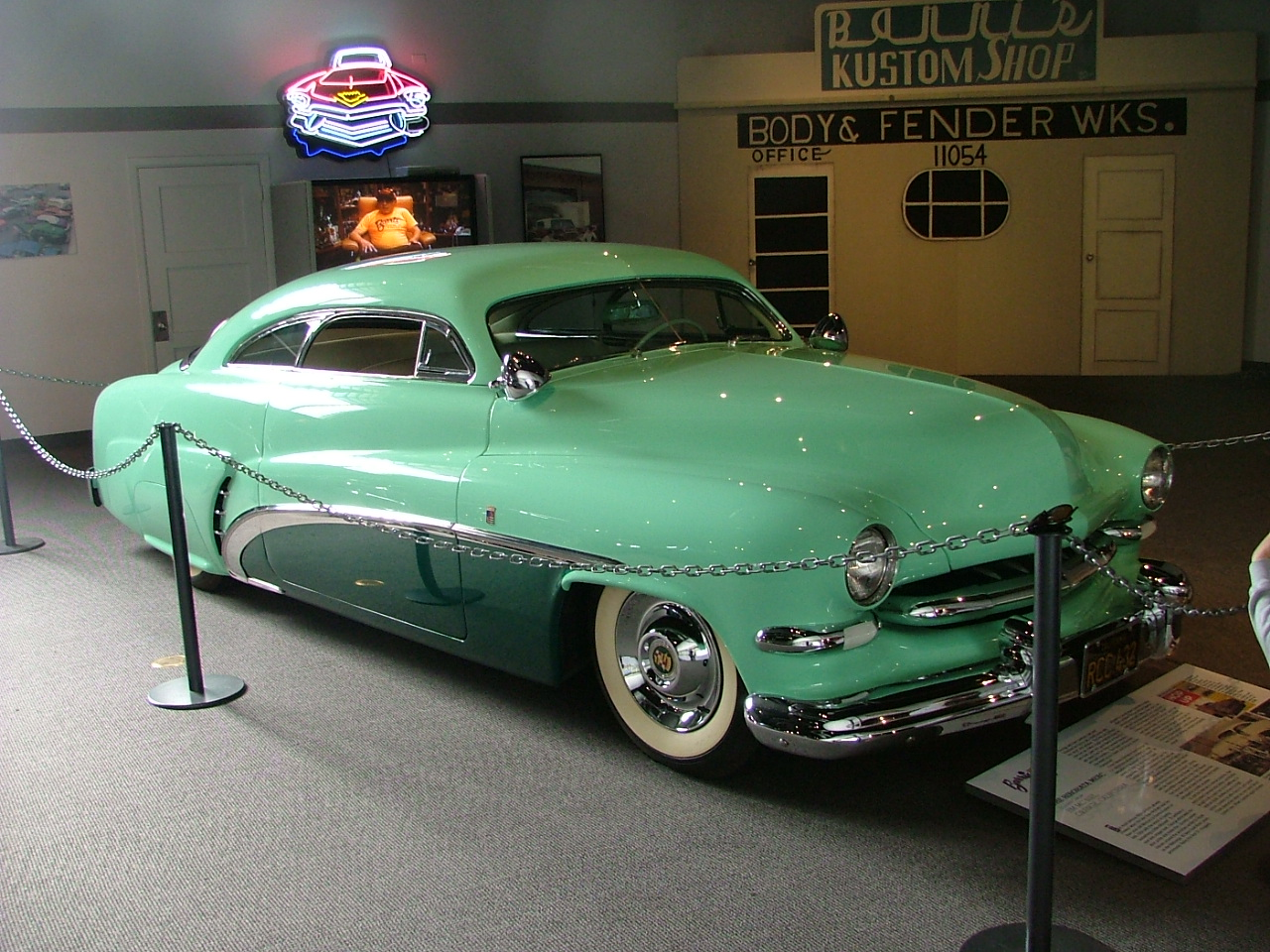
The Hirohata Merc, one of the most famous cars in the lead sled style

A lead sled is a standard production automobile with a body heavily modified in particular ways (see below); especially, though not exclusively, a 1949, 1950, or 1951 model year Ford 'Shoebox' or Mercury Eight car. In the name, "lead" (as in the heavy metal) refers to the use of lead as a bodyfiller in early days, and "sled" refers to the lowering of the vehicle, giving these vehicles the appearance that they were "slip sliding" down the highway.

Period auto body repair by an auto body mechanic used to be achieved through a combination of re-shaping sheet metal using specialist hand tools and the application of molten lead to damaged body panels, fulfilling the role of more modern polyester fillers.

The same techniques were also used in high end low-volume car production (coachbuilding) and adopted for aftermarket hot rodding body panel modifications.

Given that lead is toxic, the effective management of health hazards arising from autobody work with this material must include the exposure realms of fumes and dusts.

The term as originally coined, and still appropriately applying, to large heavy V-8 powered period American performance automobiles - distinguished by their size, mass, and straight-line acceleration rather than cornering performance or braking ability - was drafted into the aviation realm to describe aircraft with similar characteristics (having nothing whatsoever to do with the long list of dubious allegedly necessary attributes itemized below).

== Automotive usage ==
In order to be classified as a "lead sled", the vehicle was subjected to most, if not all, of the following body style modifications:

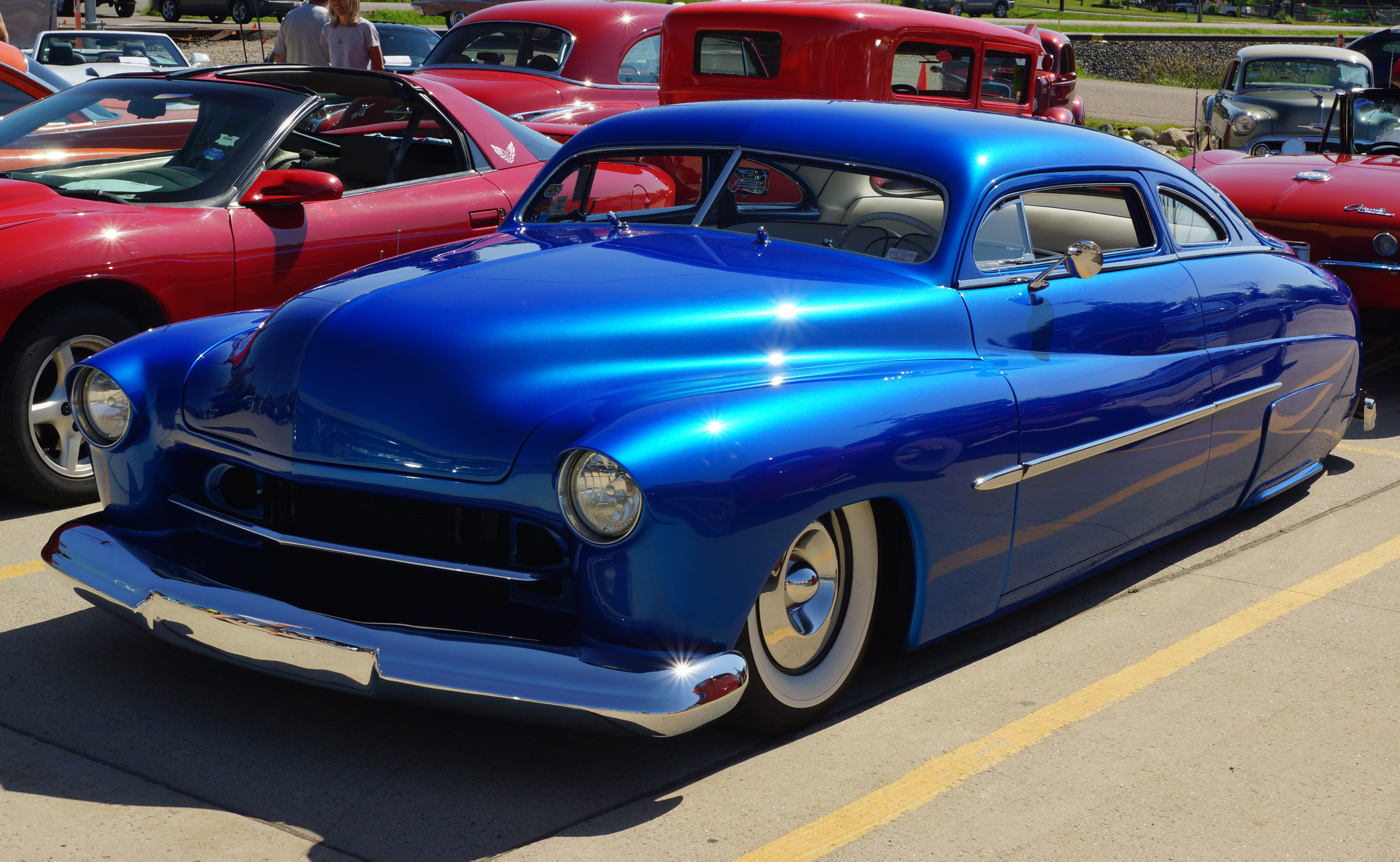

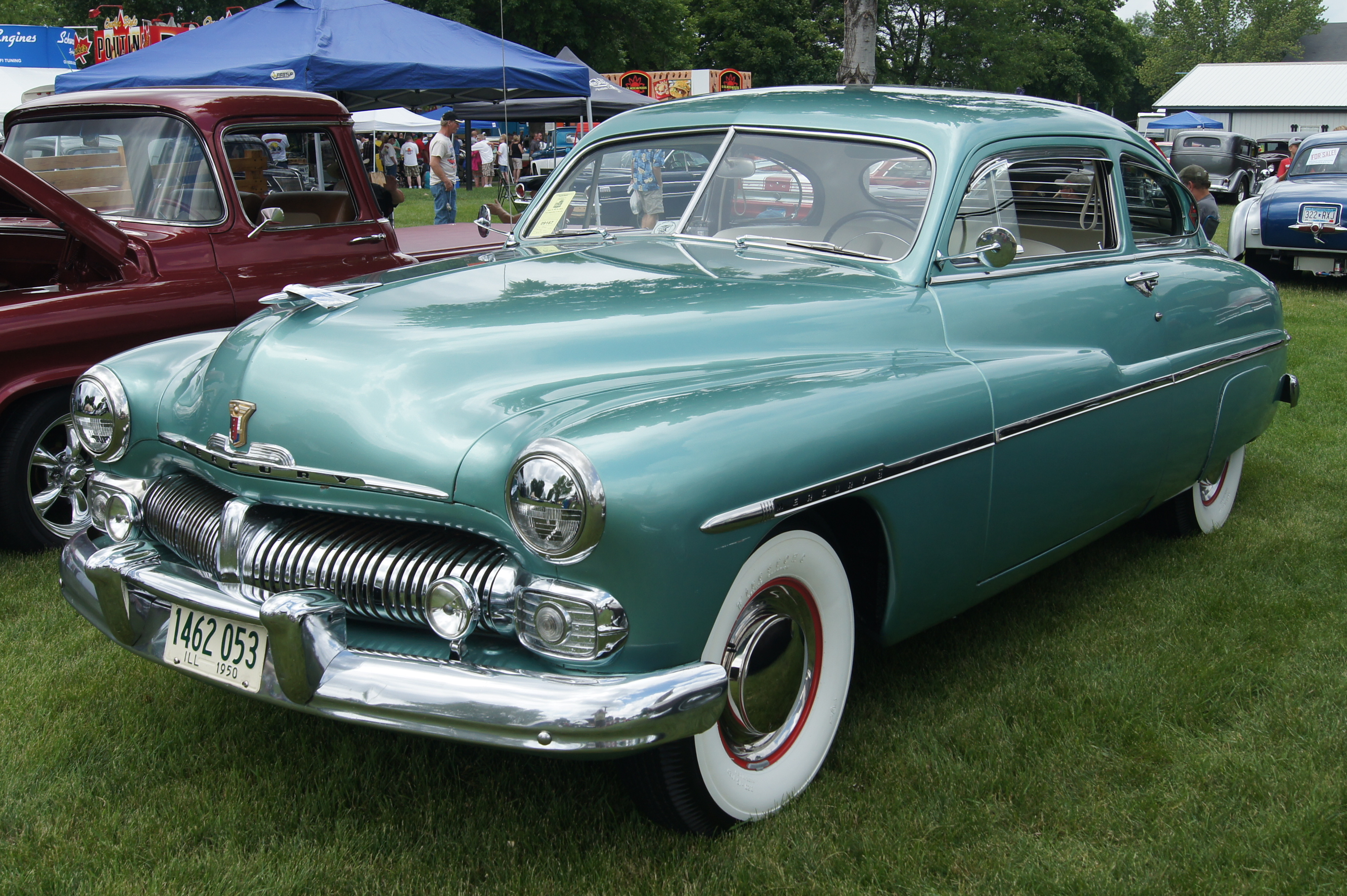
A 1950 Mercury lead sled and a stock 1950 Mercury for comparison. The lead sled has received a roof chop, fadeaway fenders, a canted B pillar, frenched headlights, shaved doorhandles and trim, and more.

- Chopped: cutting off the roof, shortening the pillars, and re-welding the roof back onto the car body
- Channeled: cutting the underside of the body to lower the entire body on the frame
- Sectioned: cutting a horizontal piece cut out of the body lengthwise, to reduce the beltline height
- Frenched: recessing headlights, tail lights, license plates, and radio antennae into the body for an exotic look.
- Emblem removal: all original manufacturer's emblems were removed as these were considered to detract from the vehicle. The thought was "anything that produces a hiccup, a bulge or extrudes from the body is not aerodynamic and detracts from the smooth appearance of the vehicle." The object of the builder is to make the body as smooth, sleek, and sexy as possible.
1. commonly referred to as "nosed" for the hood and "decked" for the trunk.
- Dechromed: all factory trim was removed as these dressings detracted from the lines of the car.
- Drip rail removal: rain drip rails were removed from the roof as they detracted from the smoothness of the vehicle.
- Shaved: door handles and locks were removed, because they detracted from the smoothness of the vehicle. Electric solenoids and switches were installed in inconspicuous places, typically under the rocker panels or side mirrors, to provide alternate means for opening the doors.

The entire process of removing badges, trim, and doorhandles was referred to as "shaving".

Grille modifications: the original grille was heavily modified, or substituted with the grille from a completely different make, model, and year car.

In the late 1940s and 1950s, plastic body filler and fiberglass did not exist. Instead, bar lead or body solder was used as a body filler. Auto body technicians pulled and pushed out dents with body spoons, hammers, and dollies until the sheet metal was as straight as they could get it. Any sheet metal that was still slightly wavy, the bodyman heated bars of lead and flowed the lead onto the body with an oxygen-acetylene torch similar to work done by a tin smith. The bars of lead were solder, but were not the more-familiar wire solder used for electrical or plumbing assembly. The lead bars or strips ranged anywhere from a quarter of an inch to one inch in width and several inches in length.

Lead craftsman call the process of melting the lead "running lead". An apprentice bodyman typically would remove the body part from the car and place it on a bench so as to have a fairly flat surface to flow the lead horizontally onto the body. In contrast, an experienced bodyman could control the heat of the lead in a vertical position without having to remove the body part, thereby saving time in performing the repair.

As time progressed, plastics such as "Bondo" were introduced to the market. These plastic body fillers are easier to work with, less toxic, and eventually replaced the use of lead in body repair.

Some common late model lead sleds are the 1949 Mercury, 1950 Plymouth, 1949 Ford, and the 1949 Cadillac. These late-model lead sleds and a play on words were the inspiration for the name of renowned custom car builder Bo Huff's Dead Sleds car club.

== Other usages ==
Among aircraft nicknames, "lead sled" has also been used as a nickname for a variety of US military aircraft, including the F-4 Phantom, F3H Demon, F-84 Thunderjet, F-105 Thunderchief, and SR-71 Blackbird. In particular these airplanes tend to be large, heavy or very fast. Despite this, the airplane's maneuverability is relatively poor. The F-105 gained this nickname during the Vietnam War. While the plane was fast in straight lines it was not very maneuverable, rendering it very vulnerable to enemy weapons.

== See also ==
- Custom car
- Kustom (cars)
- Lowrider
- Hot rod
