= Kustom (cars) =

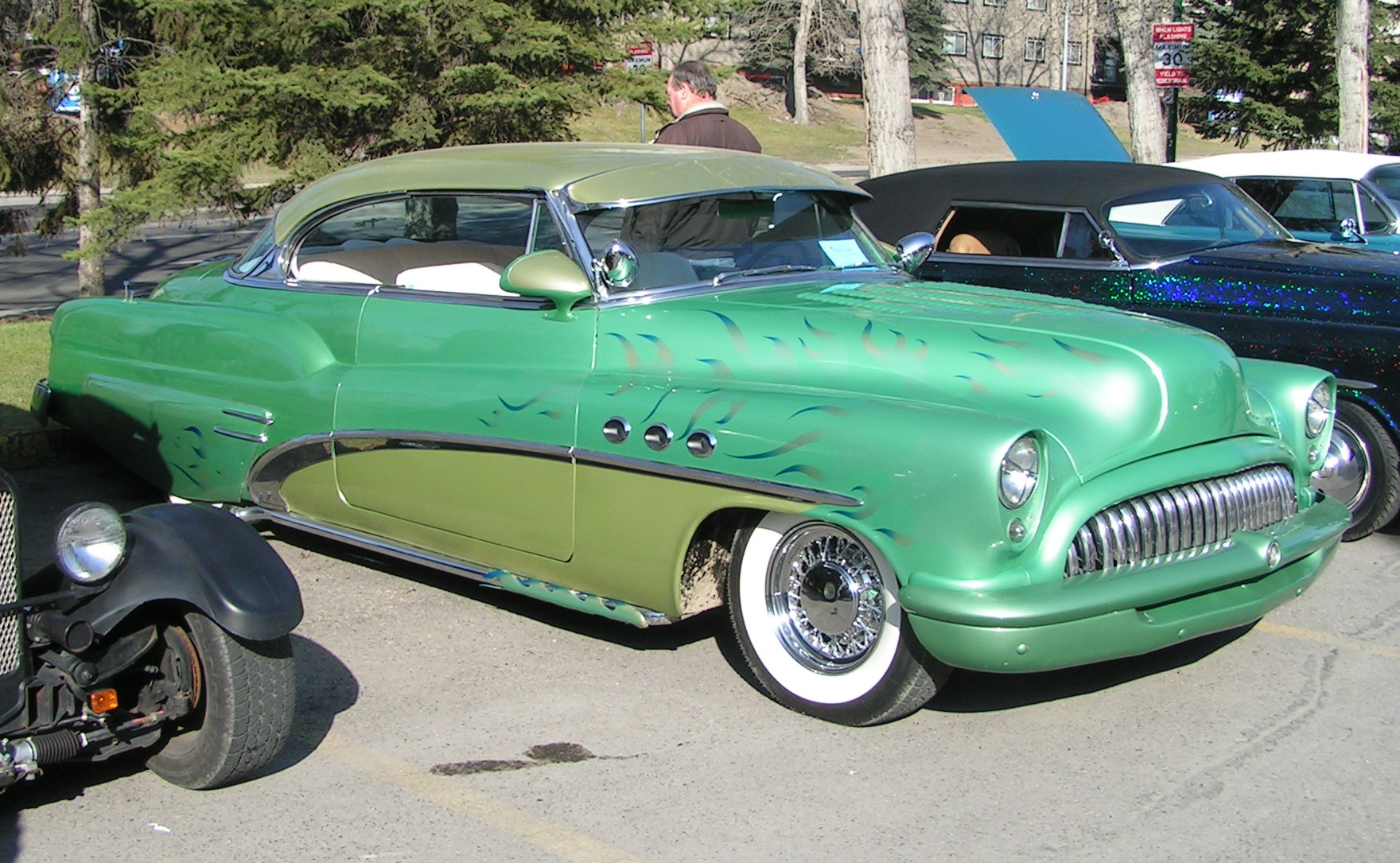
Early '50s Buick mild Kustom with wide whites, new grille and trim spears, lake pipes, Appletons, and flame job.

Kustoms are modified cars from the 1930s to the early 1960s, done in the customizing styles of that time period. The usage of a "K" for "Kustom" rather than a "C", is believed to have originated with George Barris.

== Styling ==
This style generally consists of, but is not limited to, starting with a 2-door coupe and making changes such as:

- Lowering the suspension
- Lowering the roof line, "Chopping" (usually chopped more in the rear to give a "raked back" look, B-pillars are also commonly leaned to enhance this look)
- Sectioning and/or channeling the body, (removing a section from the center of the body)
- Certain pieces of side trim are usually removed or "shaved" to make the car look longer, lower and smoother
- Door handles are "shaved" as well, and replaced by hidden buttons or remote keyless systems.
- Often parts, such as trim pieces, hoods, and grilles are taken piecewise from other cars
- Trunk lids and other pieces of the body can also be altered in this matter

=== Lights ===
The head and tail lights of a true Kustom may or may not be the original ones manufactured with the car. For example, some popular swaps would be putting Oldsmobile or Buick headlights in another model. Headlights, tail lights, antenna(e) are also subject to what is referred to as "Frenching", where the object is cut from the body, a "box" in the shape of the item is fabricated and welded into the original hole. The part is then installed back into the "Frenching Pocket" giving it a look of being recessed into the body.

=== Leading ===
Traditionally, "Lead", (a mixture of 70% lead and 30% tin) is used in bodywork of the area instead of modern polyester fillers or fiberglass, after the metal shaping is done to prepare for paint. "Leading" connotes a true Kustom "Lead Sled", a term that gained traction in the 1950s to imply a large, heavy lead-filled car. The term was generally considered negative, as it implied that the car was not very fast, though this was sometimes not the case as certain Kustoms were considered very quick. Today, the term "Lead Sled" is generally considered a compliment.

=== Grills and hubcaps ===
Grills are often changed on lead sleds as well. Some owners use pieces of other grills to customize their own. For example, using a DeSoto grill in a '50 Mercury, or a LaSalle (Cadillac) grill in a '36 Ford, two of the most recognized and classic combinations of all time. "Flipper" style hubcaps are popular on Kustoms, such as '57 Dodge Lancer (4 bars), '56 Oldsmobile Fiesta (3 bars), '59 Dodge lancer or "Crabs" as they are said to resemble a crab, Other such as '57 and '49 Cadillac hubcaps are also acceptable and referred to as "Sombreros", '57 Plymouth "cones", etc. There were also other popular styles that were purely after-market and never came factory stock on another car, like "Hollywood" flippers, or "Crossbars" for example.

=== Tires ===
It is tradition that Kustoms should have whitewall tires, most authentic being bias ply style tires. The width of the whitewall denotes the era that the particular car hearkens to. For example, a Kustom built in a 1940s style will typically have true "wide Whites" which are 3 inches or more in width, where the white rubber extends behind the rim of the wheel, this style is period correct for Kustoms up to the mid 1950s. From the mid to late 1950s, a narrower (but still wide) extending to the rim of the wheel. In 1956, GM had a concept car called "Biscayne" (styling elements that were later used on Corvettes, '57 Chevrolets, and Corvairs). This car featured some new high-tech looking tires that had only a very thin stripe of whitewall rubber. By 1958, Cadillac starts selling cars with these types of "Skinny Whites" or "Inch walls"; they were an instant hit and all the rage with the Kustom Krowd. This style of thinner 1 in, 1.5 in, 1.3 in, 3/8 in, or 5/8 in whitewall continued to be popular into the 1960s and are still common on some newer cars today.

=== Exhaust pipes ===
"Lake pipes" were another Kustom mainstay. These were long or short chrome pipes that run back from behind the front wheels wells. They have either one of three removable end plugs for running flat through with open exhaust, and originated in racing cars that competed on the dry lake beds of southern California in the mid-20th century. Side pipes are similar but do not include removable plugs, "Bellflower" tips are similar but run from the rear wheel well back under the bumper, a style that emerged in the Bellflower, California area in the early 1960s.

== Schools of Kustomizing ==
There are multiple differing schools of Kustomizing, ranging in the extent to which the cars are modified, visually and mechanically.

=== Mild Kustom ===
The term "Mild Kustom" refers to a fairly conservative approach to Kustomizing, where the majority of the original beauty and identity of the car are retained.

=== Full Kustom ===
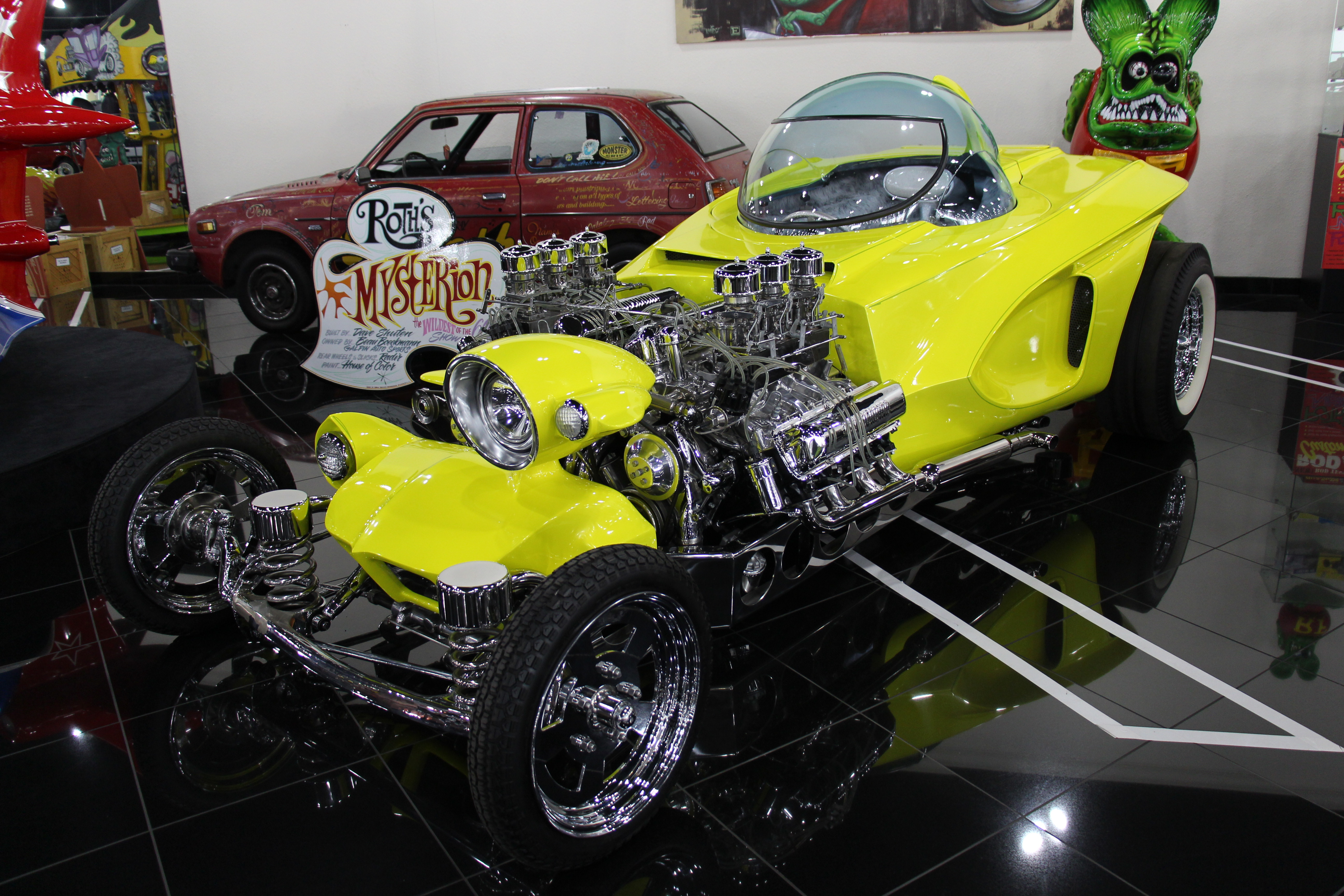
The Mysterion show rod by Ed Roth

A "Full Kustom" refers to a car that has been severely altered from every aspect possible almost every exterior panel is re-shaped, interiors, dash, engine bay, suspension, heavily chromed mechanical components, etc.

=== Bomb ===
There is also a third version of a true Kustom, the "Bomb". These were the original Lowriders, which developed back in the 1940s through the 1960s alongside the other types of Kustoms. These usually were similar to the mild Kustoms in that they emphasize keeping the car as original as possible, but using custom paint, chrome, and often covered with every type of bolt-on period correct accessory possible. Having more accessories is considered good, or even honorable. Bombs usually have heavily altered suspensions that incorporate traditional hydraulics setups, with the most authentic using discarded World War II aircraft hydraulic components, which were largely available after WWII. Many modern Kustoms use "Air Bags", which are not considered traditional, but are often given a free pass due to the difficulty and/or expense of finding and fitting true hydraulic components.

=== Terminology ===
These cars can also be referred to as custom cars, lead sleds or sleds. The term Kustom is generally used as a signifier that the car's styling harks back to the '50s or early '60s, as opposed to later, more modern styles.

== See also ==
- Kustom Kulture
- Custom car
- Hot rod
