= Debadging =

Removal of emblems from a vehicle

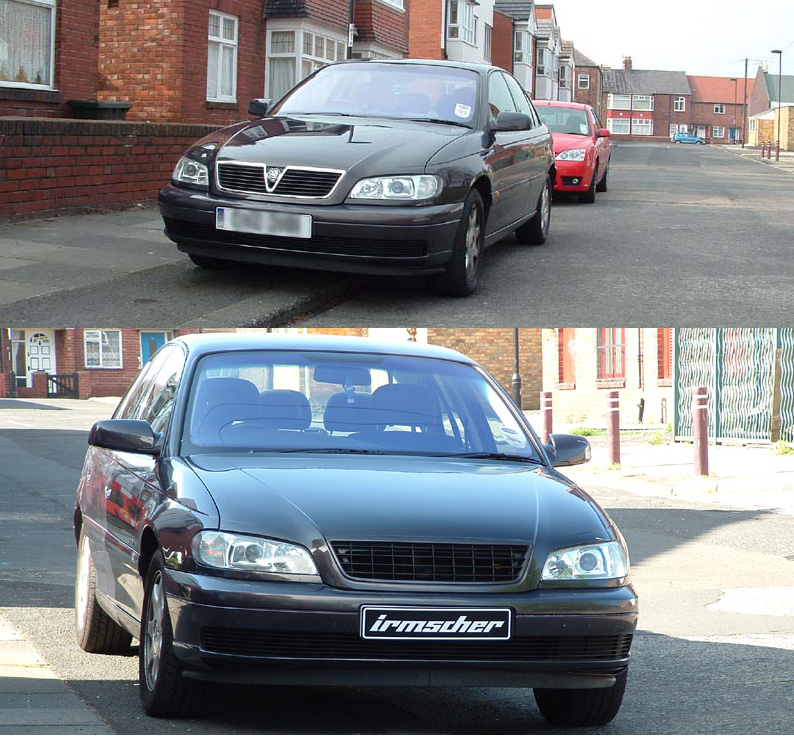
Before and after

Debadging is the process of removing the manufacturer's emblems from a vehicle. Common emblems to be removed include the manufacturer's logo as well as the emblems designating the model of the vehicle.

Often debadging is done to complement the smoothed-out bodywork of a modified car, or to disguise a lower-specification model. Some people driving high-end luxury cars do it so as not to flaunt the fact their car is any different from any other model. In Europe in particular, it is a common request for purchasers of high-end models of cars like BMW or Mercedes-Benz, etc. to have the emblems removed. Many automotive enthusiasts also believe that debadging a vehicle makes it easier to clean. This is because manufacturer badges are notorious for trapping wax, which is difficult to remove from small crevices. Also, sleepers are sometimes debadged to disguise any subtle evidence of a high performance vehicle.

Another common reason for debadging is to rid the car of its commercial advertising. Drivers are not being paid to advertise the brand, so some decide to remove this commercial aspect of the vehicle. Similarly, film, television and advertising companies may elect to have vehicles debadged in a work to avoid implying product placement or endorsement of a particular vehicle marque.

While most modern vehicle emblems are attached with adhesive and can be easily removed, some emblems require varying degrees of bodywork to fill in voids and mounting holes left behind.

Debadging can also refer to the process of removing the car manufacturer's logo from the front grille. The grille is often replaced by a plain grille, or a grille from another make and model of car altogether or one showing the more subtle logo of an aftermarket manufacturer such as ABT, Irmscher or Kamei. This is a common customising technique on leadsleds and kustoms, which dates back to the 1940s.

Criminals have been known to debadge a car before using it for crimes ranging from simple toll evasion to more serious offenses.

== Manufacturer debadging ==
Cases where a car manufacturer has officially removed its badges from its own cars are very rare. One such example is the Daewoo Damas/Labo, where in March 2011 in South Korea, the "Daewoo" badge was dropped, and the cars started being sold only under the Damas/Labo name, without an official brand alongside it.

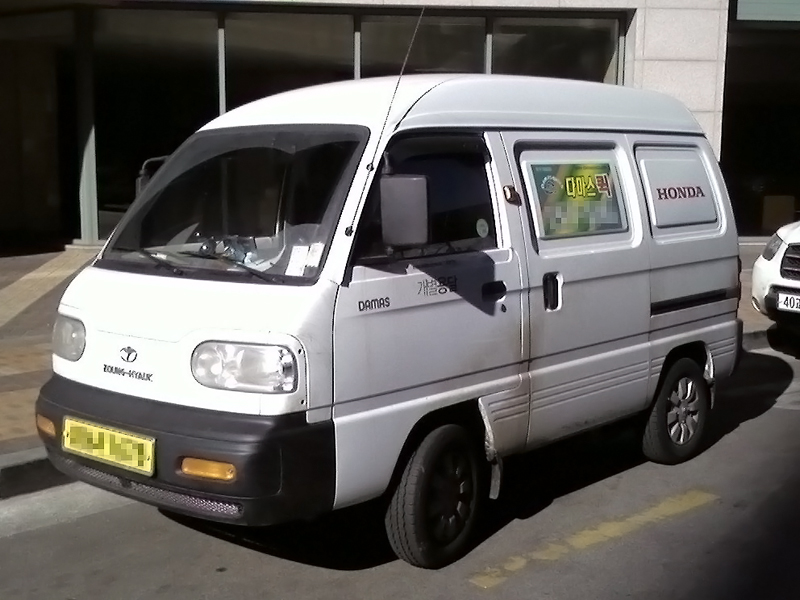
Before

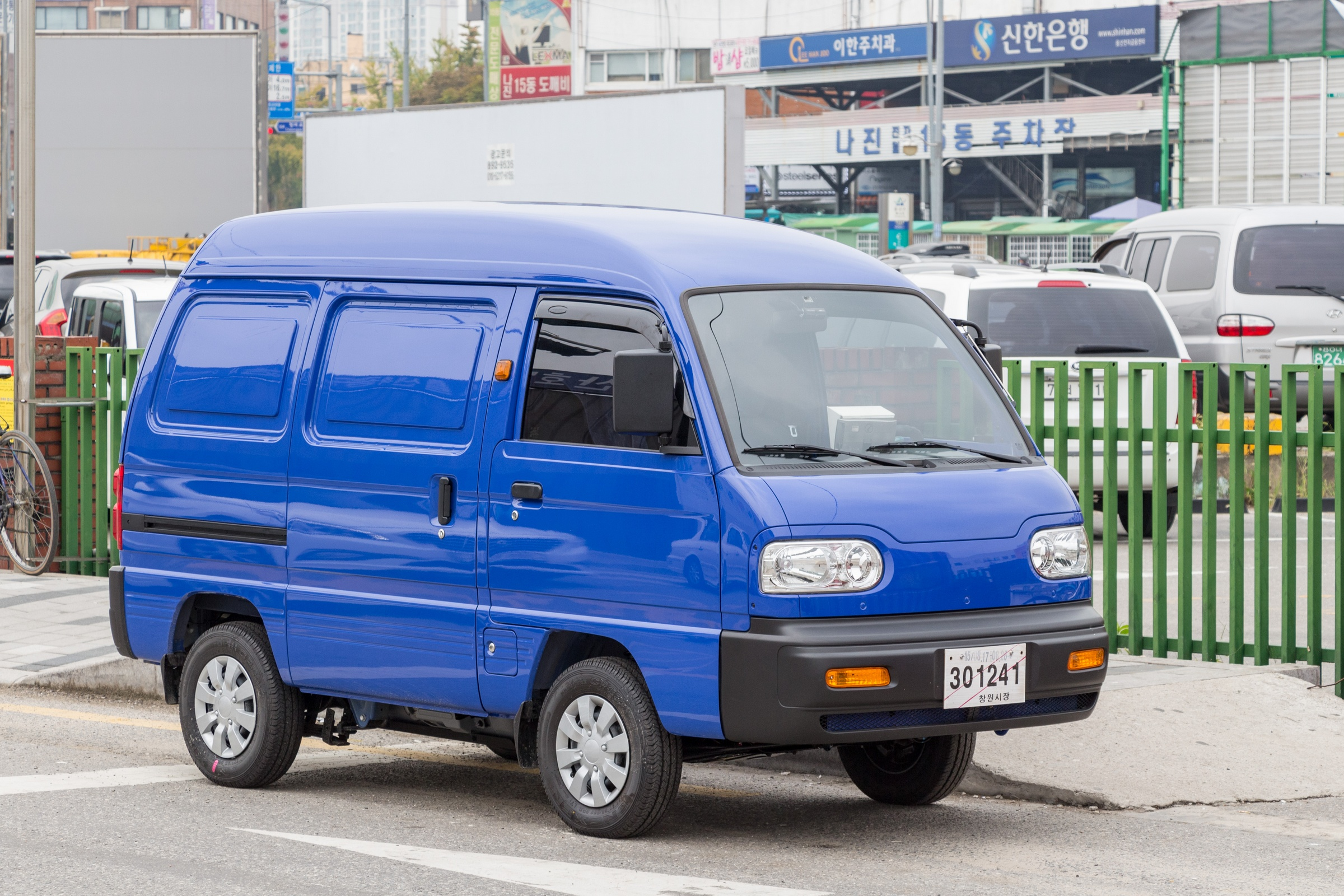
After

Some premium car manufacturers such as Porsche allow build-to-order vehicles to be configured with make and model badges customised, selectively retained, or removed altogether.

== Implications ==
=== Legality ===
In the United States, debadging a vehicle is not federally outlawed. Local jurisdictions may uphold laws prohibiting modification of identifying features of motor vehicles.

In many European countries, debadging a car is legal, and is even normalized, especially for luxury cars.

=== Devaluation ===
Debadging a vehicle can devalue it, especially when its body is damaged during the process. Luxury cars are more vulnerable to devaluation.

=== Warranty ===
Car warranties are not usually affected by debadging, given that no other extreme or expensive modifications are made to the car.

=== Insurance ===
Similar to warranty, generally, vehicle insurance companies will not change rates or premiums if an insured vehicle is debadged.

== See also ==
- Rebadging
- Builder's plate
- White-label product
