= Frenching (automobile) =

Custom car body modification

Frenching is the act of recessing or moulding a headlight, taillight, antenna or number plate into a car body to give a smoother look to the vehicle. The name originates from the final result looking like a French cuff of a shirt sleeve, which has a ridge at the end. Also known as tunnelling, it is a common modification used on leadsleds and customs since the 1930s.

Frenching a headlight or taillight is done in one of two ways: either removing the bezel, mounting the light deeper in the car's head or taillight nacelle and using the headlight rings from another car (or an aftermarket kit) to mount it deeper into the body. It can also be done by modifying the light's mountings, so that they can be removed from behind, welding the bezel to the body once the chrome plating is taken off and painting it body colour. This gives the effect of visually lengthening the car, as well as smoothing out the body. Many customs have lights from another car transplanted in place of the original factory items, but even these are frenched as well.

This modification is rarely carried out on late models, as newer cars have flush-fitting headlights. This is a styling cue both influenced by customising and a means of improving the aerodynamics of the car.

== Tunnelling ==
This is done by cutting an area of sheet metal in the shape of a number plate, fabricating a box and welding it deeper into the body. The same principle is used in recessing car radio antennas, only that a hole must be drilled into the bottom of the tubing to let water drain out, reducing the risk of corrosion. This modification is still used on minitrucks, leadsleds and customized cars to this day.

== See also ==
- Roof chop
- Body drop
- Custom car
- Leadsled
