= Car model =

Industrial automobile model

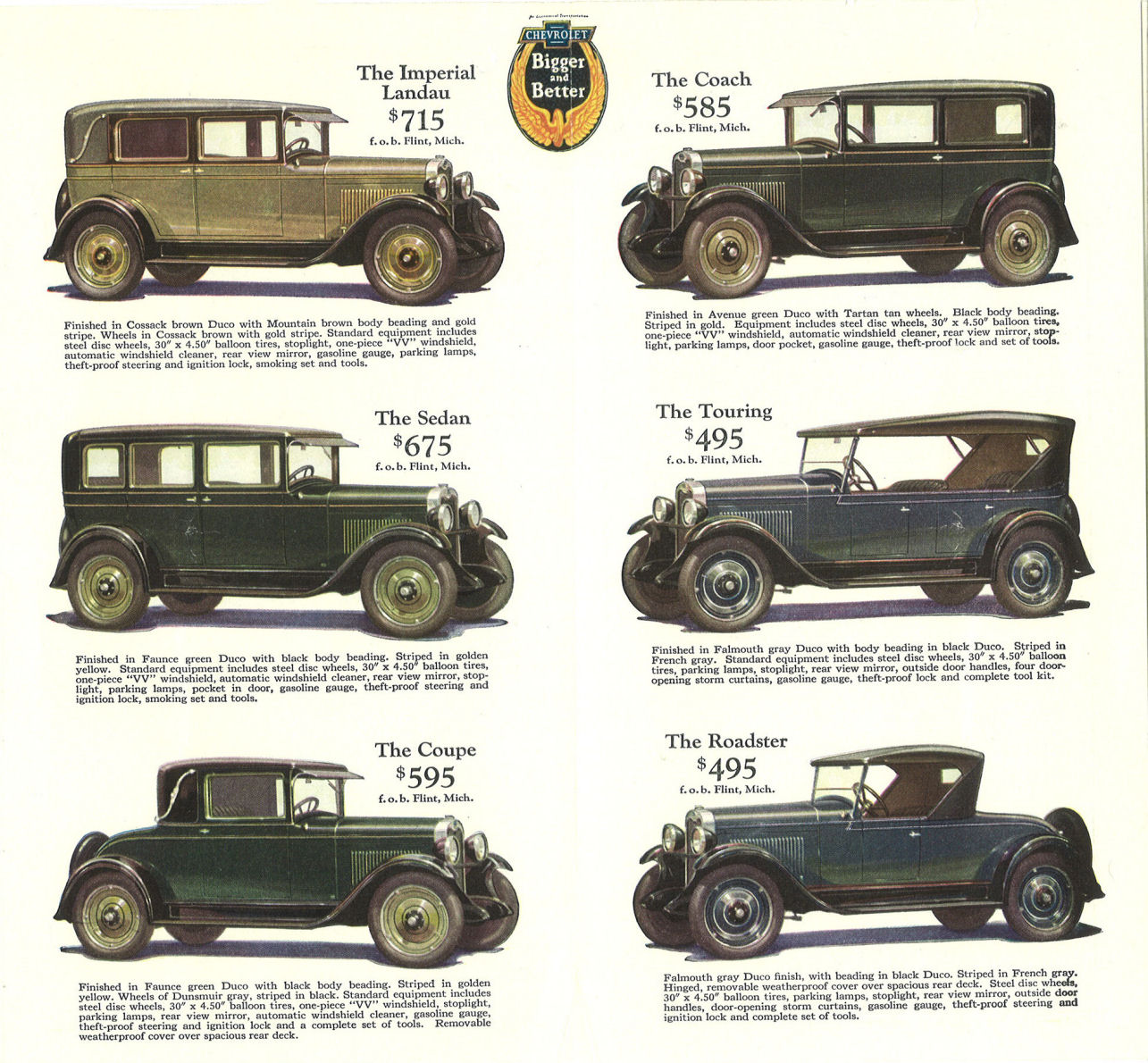
Chevrolet models sold in 1928

The model of a car is its design, in the context of the manufacturer's range or series of cars. Different models, variants are distinguishable by technology, components, underpinnings, and/or style and appearance.

The methods used to categorise cars into models differ significantly between manufacturers. Frequently, several different body variants are offered, depending on market demand; and when completing their 'production lifespan', sufficiently successful models are usually followed by a new 'generation' of that model.

The name of a model (range or series) is almost always trademarked, so that competing manufacturers cannot also use it (unless the owner permits it, for an agreed licence fee).

A popular model can have a significantly valuable brand name, and manufacturers often take great care in fostering and maintaining the brand image of the models bearing the name, both in terms of key model characteristics, as well as the targeted market, and the expected or desired buyer's demographic.

== Common characteristics ==
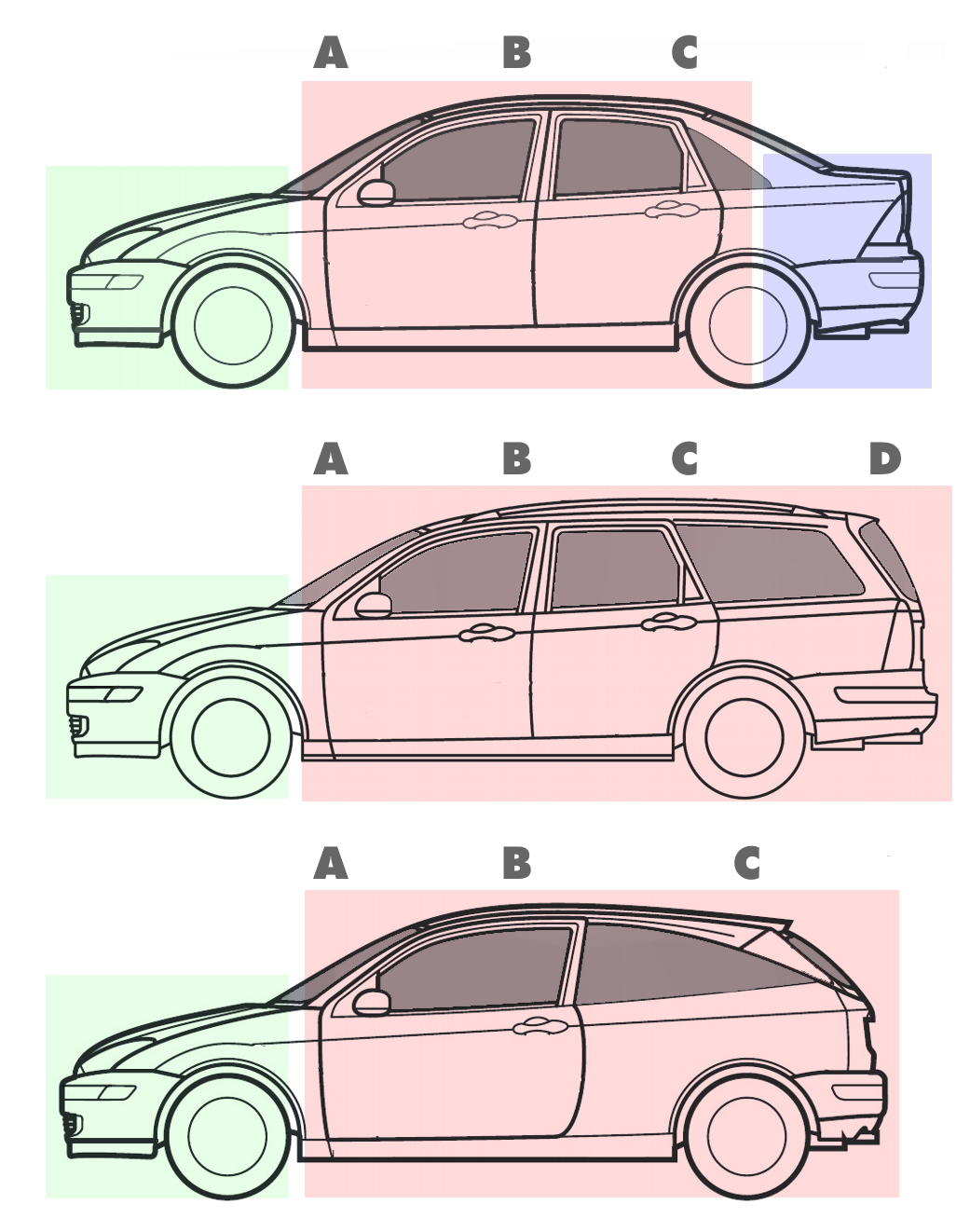
Ford Focus body styles: sedan, station wagon and hatchback

Equipment, upholstery and exterior trim are usually determined by the trim level, the car model often defines the platform (which determines the engines, drivetrains and chassis options available), body styles and aesthetic theme.

Some models have only one body style (e.g. the Hyundai i20 hatchback), while other models are produced in several body styles (e.g. the Audi A3, which has been produced in hatchback, sedan and convertible body styles). In some cases, a manufacturer has marketed a body style as a separate model, such as the Volkswagen Jetta and the BMW 4 Series, which are based on the Volkswagen Golf and BMW 3 Series platforms respectively.

Some models have an only engine (or electric/hybrid powertrain) option available, while other models have multiple powertrains available such as Front Wheel Drive, Rear Wheel Drive and Four Wheel Drive.

In North America, a model can also be called a nameplate. The Chevrolet Suburban is the oldest automobile nameplate in continuous production, dating to 1934, and the 1940-1996 Chrysler New Yorker was another long-running North American car nameplate. However, the term "nameplate" is also sometimes used to describe an entire brand, rather than a specific model. The Rolls-Royce Phantom is also a long-running model that has returned for 2003, having originally been introduced in 1925.

=== Country-specific model names ===
The same car model may be sold by the automaker in different countries under different model names. Examples include Mitsubishi Pajero / Montero, Mazda MX-5 / Miata, Volkswagen Golf / Rabbit and Ford Everest / Endeavour.

== Model years ==
The model year (MY) is a manner of indicating the version of a car that has been produced and changed over multiple years.

== Trim level ==
Beyond the standard equipment that is fitted to all vehicles for a model, additional features (such as the upholstery, interior equipment, safety features and exterior aerodynamic/styling upgrades) are often determined by the trim level of the vehicle.

Many manufacturers also allow additional equipment to be added to a vehicle by purchasing individual options (such as alloy wheels) or 'packages' of bundled options (such as a "safety package" consisting of lane departure warning system, collision avoidance system and additional airbags).

== Model code ==
Model codes (also known as chassis codes, codename, designation, or descriptor, among others) are designated to a vehicle to provide identification. It provides information on its type, and to an extent its engine, transmission and body style. Some manufacturers include model codes on the vehicle identification plate alongside the vehicle identification number. Some manufacturers adopted development codes as model codes. Model codes can be used to find the correct parts for the vehicle.

== See also ==
- Automotive industry
- Rebranding (automobile)
- Model change
- Marque
- Model year
