= Body solder =

Automotive body repair material and process

Body solder is a type of solder used to smooth the surface of automobile bodies before painting. It has been largely supplanted by polyester body fillers, such as Bondo, and others, but many purists and auto customizers continue to use body solder, asserting that it bonds better to sheet metal, feels better, wears better, resists higher temperatures, and can be powder coated or otherwise chemically plated.

== Overview ==
Body solder is available in both leaded and lead-free formulas from most suppliers of auto customization parts and tools. Leaded body solders usually are an alloy of lead and 2 to 10% tin. Body solder is melted with a blowtorch and flowed onto a car, and then shaped with a solid wood (often oak) paddle or spatula. It is then filed, not sanded, to adjust its profile.
