= Bondo (putty) =

Automotive body filler brand

- 3M's Bondo logo
- Product type: Automotive body filler
- Produced by: 3M
- Introduced: 1955

Bondo is a polyester putty product originally marketed as an automotive body filler. Nowadays the brand name is used by 3M for a line of American-made products for automotive, marine and household repairs. The term Bondo is trademarked by 3M, but is commonly used to refer to any brand of automotive repair putty due to its popularity. It is also used by sculptors.

== History ==
Before the 1950s, body solder was often used to repair large imperfections prior to painting in both new cars and vehicle repair shops. Solder repairs were conducted using a flame and wooden paddles covered in tallow or motor oil, which prevented the half-molten lead from sticking.

After World War II, automotive panels became thinner and larger, with a greater susceptibility to warping, making hot solder unsuitable. The earliest 'plastic solder' can be traced to around 1940, a do-it-yourself solution to panel beating. This gave the consumer the ability to attempt reasonably priced and long lasting repairs. These early fillers were epoxy-based and one-part, drying by outgassing. Originally, the plastic fillers performed badly compared to solder, but later improvements addressed this.

Bondo, a two-part mix (resin with hardener added) of talc and plastic, was introduced in 1955. It was developed by WWII veteran and automotive repair shop owner Robert Merton Spink of Miami, Florida. Bondo was acquired by 3M in 2007.
