= Mercury Eight =

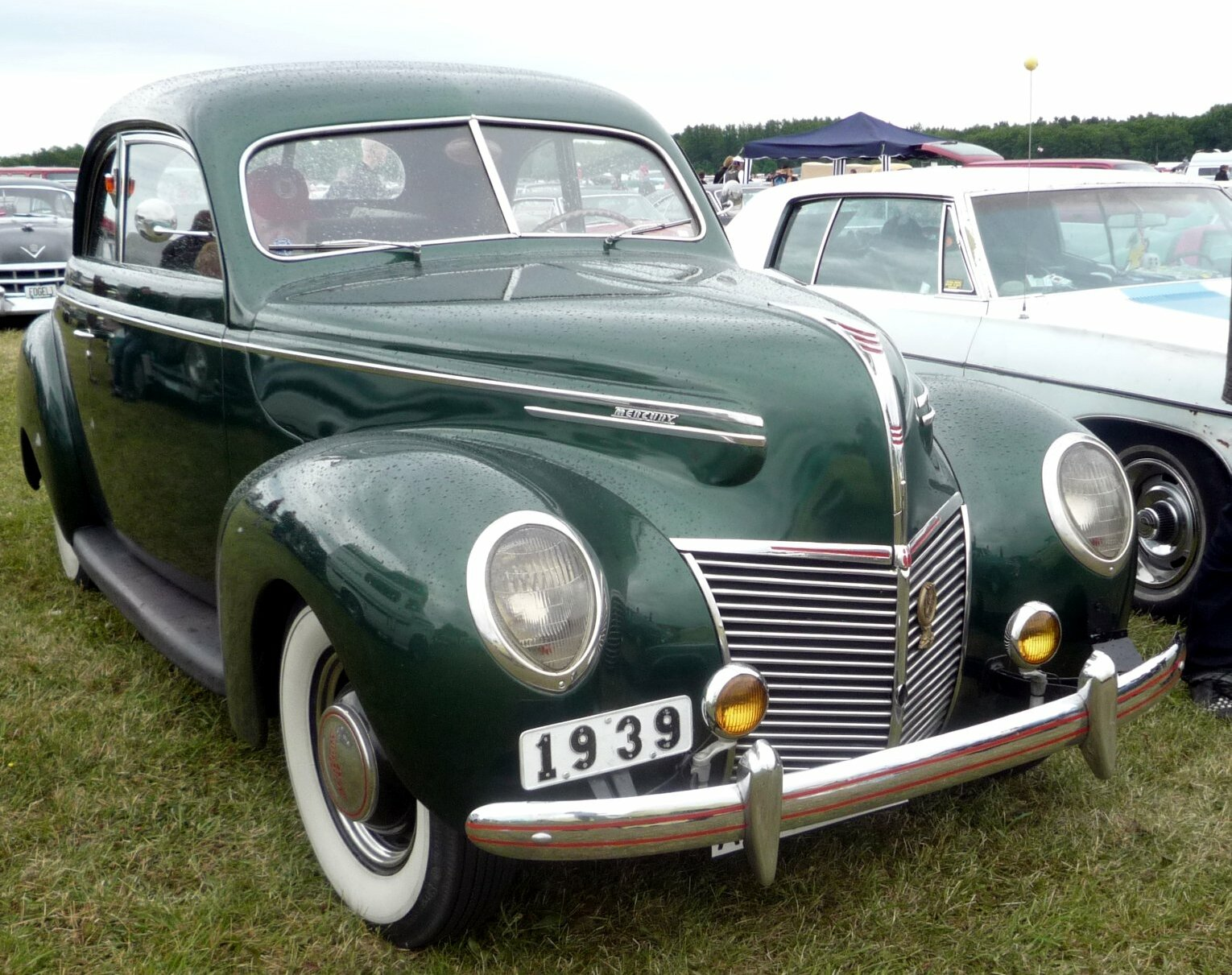
- 1939 Mercury 8 two-door Sedan

Overview
- Manufacturer: Mercury (Ford)
- Production: 1939–1951
- Assembly: Main plant: Dearborn, Michigan; Wayne, Michigan (starting 1952); Branch assembly: Long Beach, California; Maywood, California (starting 1948); St. Louis Missouri; Metuchen, New Jersey (1939–1942); Bucharest, Romania

Body and chassis
- Class: Full-size
- Layout: FR layout

Chronology
- Successor: Mercury Monterey; Mercury Custom

The Mercury Eight is an automobile that was produced by the American manufacturer Ford Motor Company under their now defunct division Mercury between 1939 and 1951. The debut model line of the Mercury division, Ford positioned the full-size Mercury Eight between the Ford Deluxe (later Custom) model lines and the Lincoln. In total, Ford assembled three generations of the Eight (before and after World War II).

During its production, the Eight offered a full range of body styles, including coupes, sedans, convertibles, and station wagons. For its first generation, the Eight was produced with its own body, adapting its own version of a Ford body for its second generation; for the third generation, the Eight shared its body with the Lincoln.

For the 1952 model year, Ford expanded its namesake division to three nameplates and Lincoln and Mercury to two each, with Mercury replacing the Eight with Monterey (introduced in 1950 as a trim option), lasting until 1974.

== First generation (1939–1940) ==
Series 99A/09A
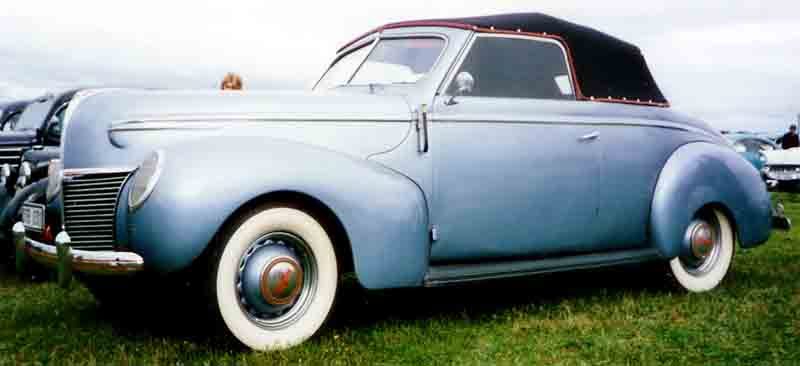
- 1939 Mercury 8 Sport Convertible

Overview
- Model years: 1939–1940

Body and chassis
- Body style: 2-door coupe; 2-door convertible; 2-door sedan; 4-door sedan; 4-door convertible

Powertrain
- Engine: 239 cu in (3.9 L) Flathead V8
- Transmission: 3-speed manual transmission

Dimensions
- Wheelbase: 116.0 in (2,946 mm)
- Length: 196.0 in (4,978 mm)

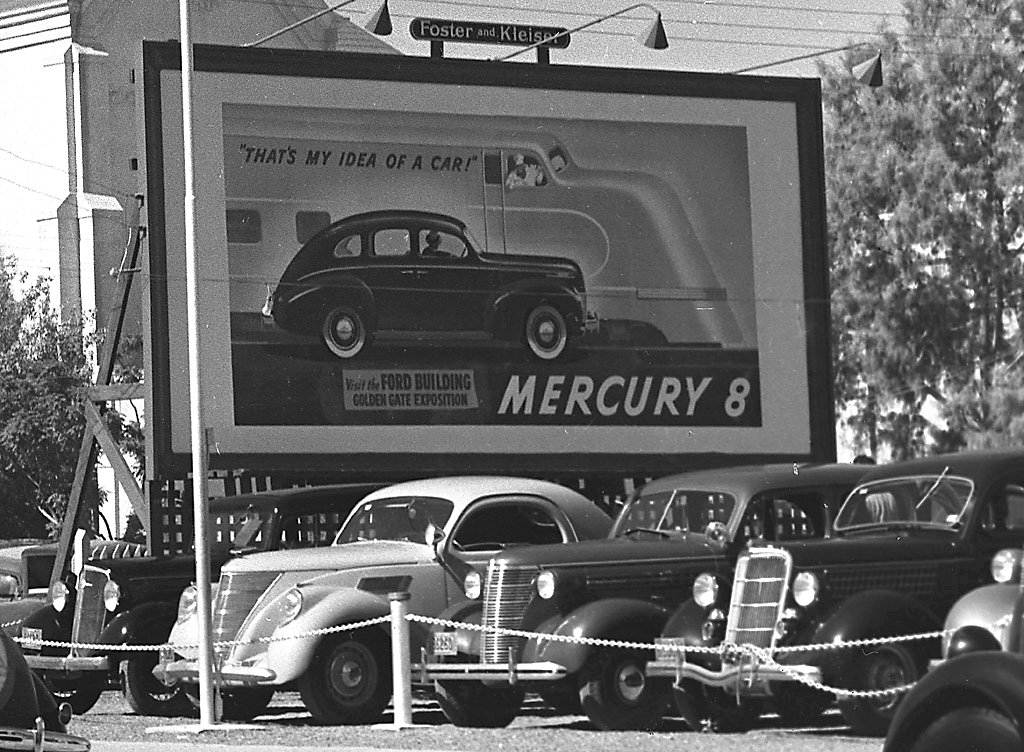
1939 Mercury Eight billboard

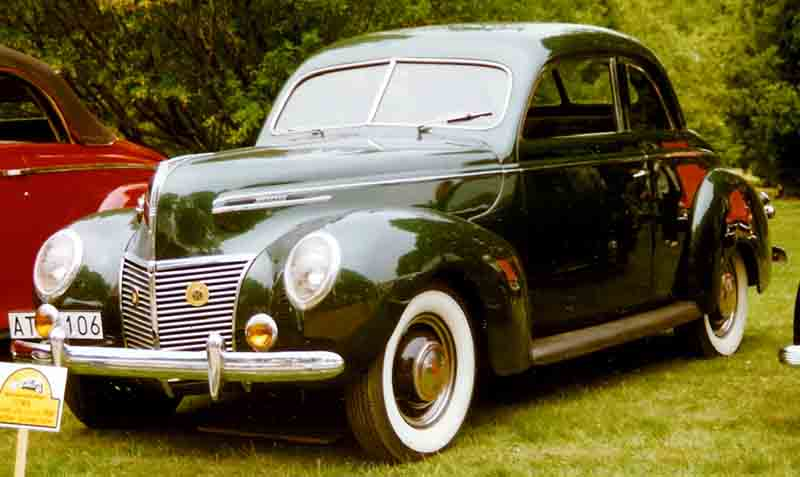
1939 Mercury 8 two-door Sedan

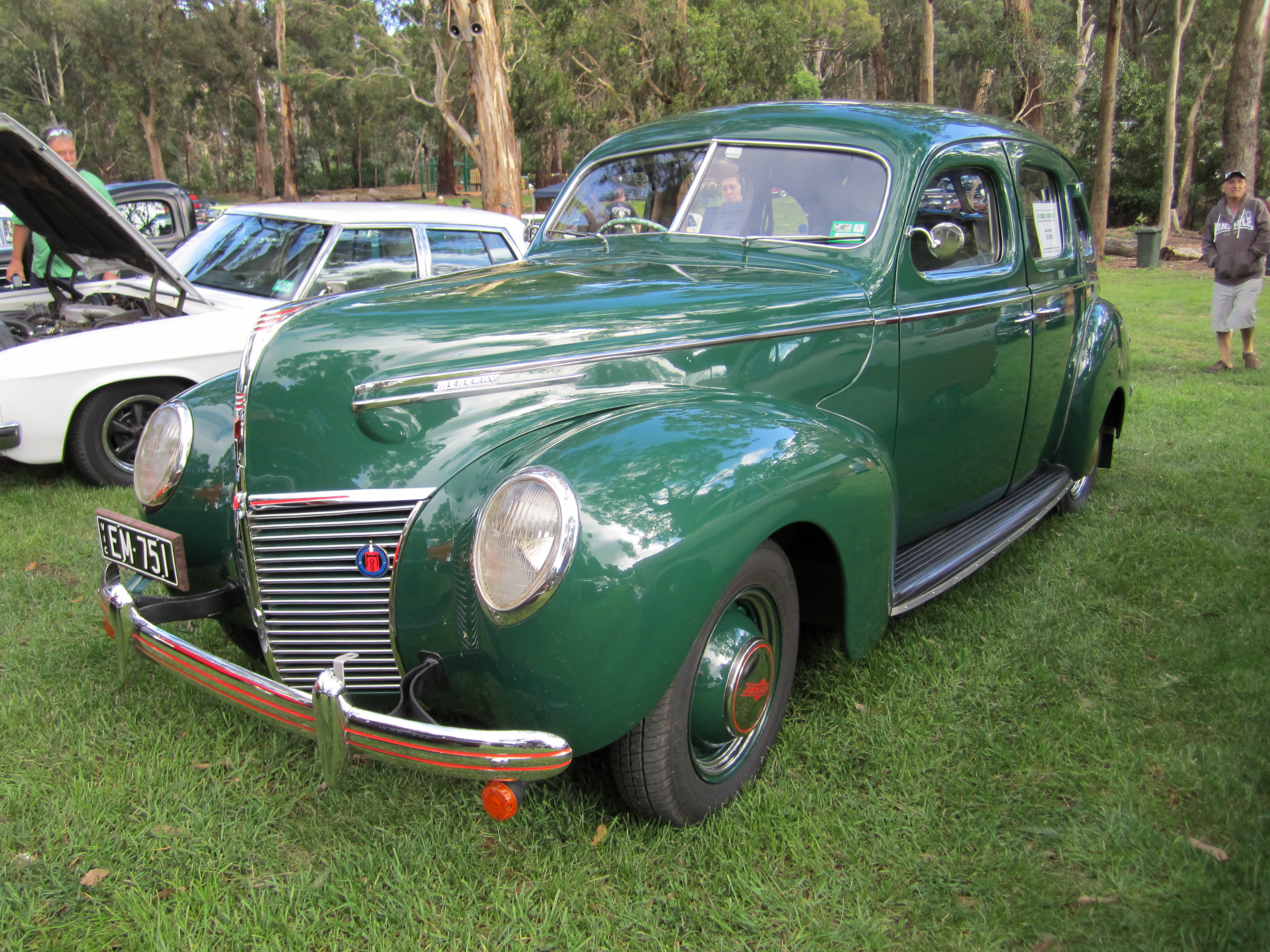
1939 Mercury 8 four-door Sedan

The advertisements for this car declared it to be "The car that truly dares to ask 'Why?'", referring to the idea that a big car could not also be economical. The Mercury two-door sedan was listed at US$946 ($21,896 in 2025 dollars), several hundred dollars more than the 1937 Ford V-8, several hundred less than the Lincoln-Zephyr and about the same as the upper-range Oldsmobile and Dodges, Hudsons, and the lower-range Buicks and DeSotos, sales from all of which, it was hoped that customers would trade in their cars for the new Mercury. Its engine was a 95 hp version of the Ford flathead V8 engine, its styling was inspired by the Zephyr, and it had standard equipment hydraulic brakes using 12-inch drums. With a wheelbase of 116.0 in (2,946 mm) and an overall length of 196.0 in (4,978 mm), it was a good-sized car, which the Ford company advertised extensively, together with its up-to-20 mpg performance—"few cars of any size can equal such economy". Double sun visors became standard in 1940.

Although "Eight" script would not appear on the front of the hood until the 1941 model year, sales literature prominently referred to the car as the "Mercury Eight" from the very beginning. This is no doubt because the actual series names, 99A in 1939 and 09A in 1940, were somewhat less enticing. A 1940 09A model has the words "Mercury Eight" in an emblem that runs from front to rear alongside the top hood lines on both sides. It appears as chrome wording on top of a double red bar.

By the end of 1940 Mercury could run with the headline "It's made 150,000 owners change cars!"

== Second generation (1941–1948) ==
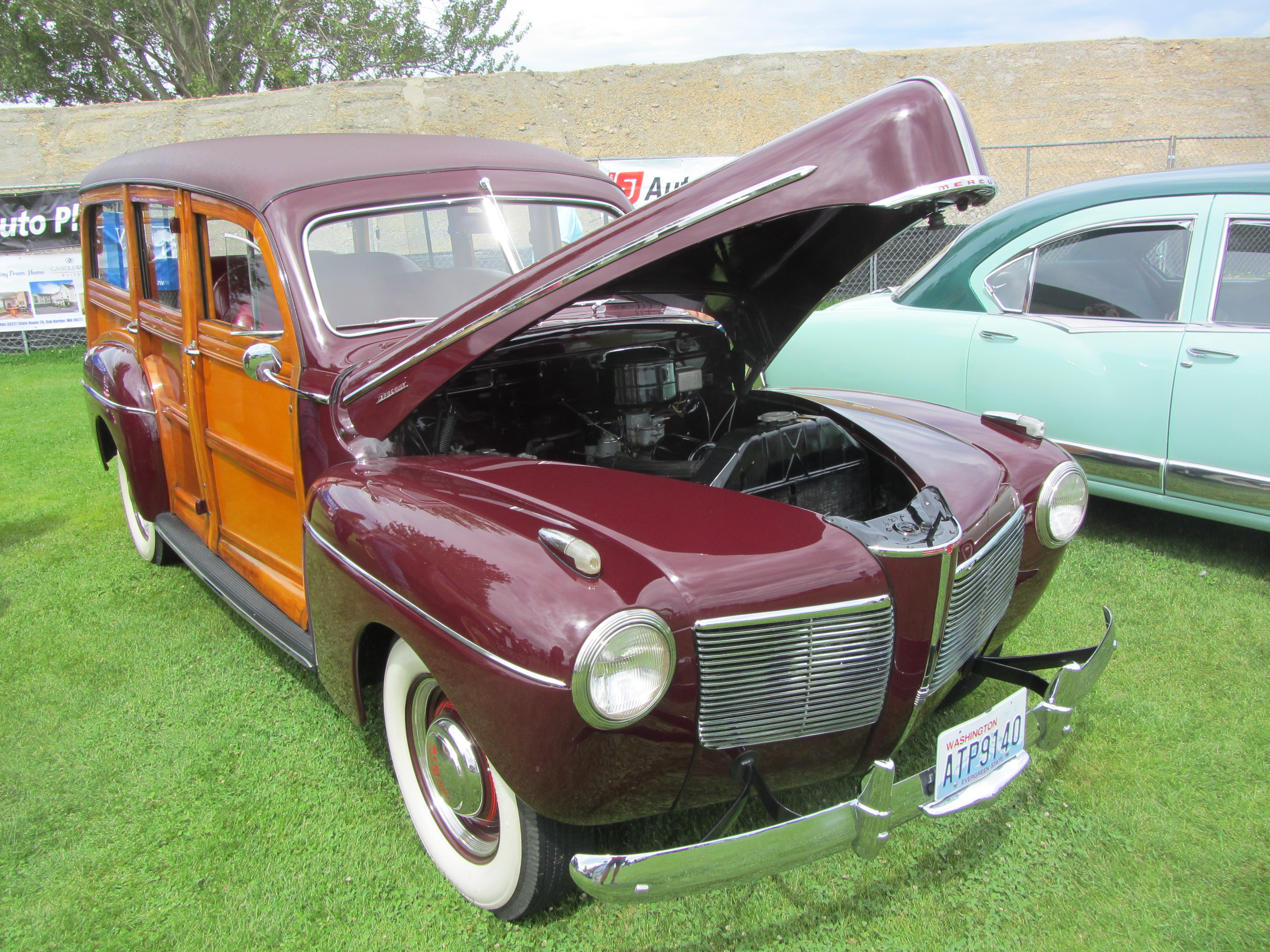
1941 Mercury Eight Station Wagon

Series 19A/29A
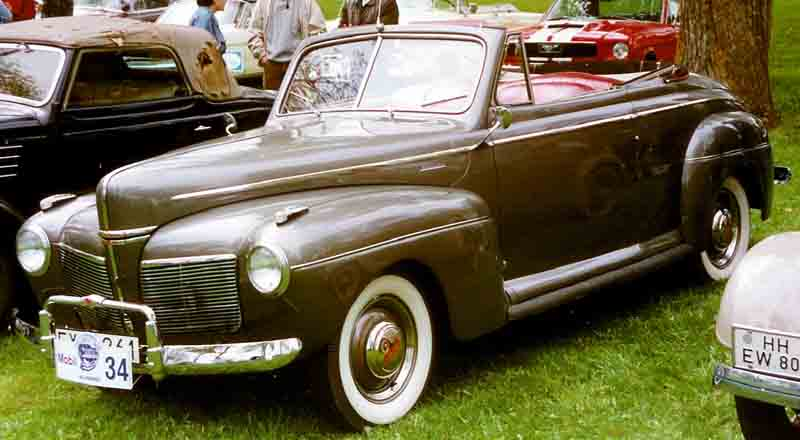
- 1941 Mercury Eight Club Convertible

Overview
- Model years: 1941–1942, 1946–1948

Body and chassis
- Body style: 2-door coupe; 2-door convertible; 4-door sedan; 4-door station wagon; 2-door Sportsman convertible

Powertrain
- Engine: 239 cu in (3.9 L) Flathead V8
- Transmission: 3-speed manual transmission LiquidMatic semi-automatic transmission (1942)

Dimensions
- Wheelbase: 118.0 in (2,997 mm)
- Length: 1941–46: 201.6 in (5,121 mm); 1947–48: 201.8 in (5,126 mm)
- Width: 73.3 in (1,862 mm)
- Height: 69.1 in (1,755 mm)
- Curb weight: 3,400–3,800 lb (1,500–1,700 kg)

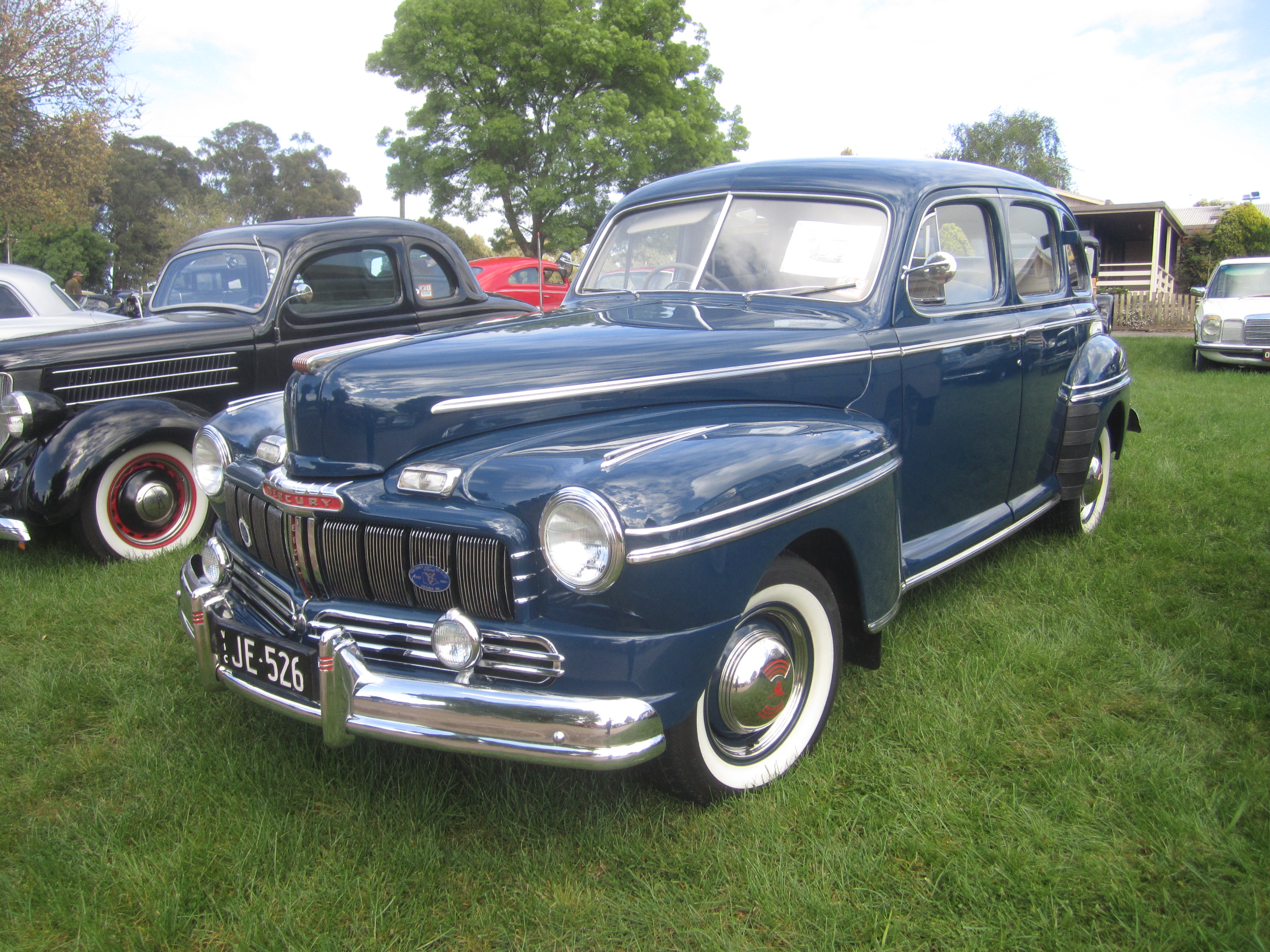
1946 Mercury Eight Town Sedan

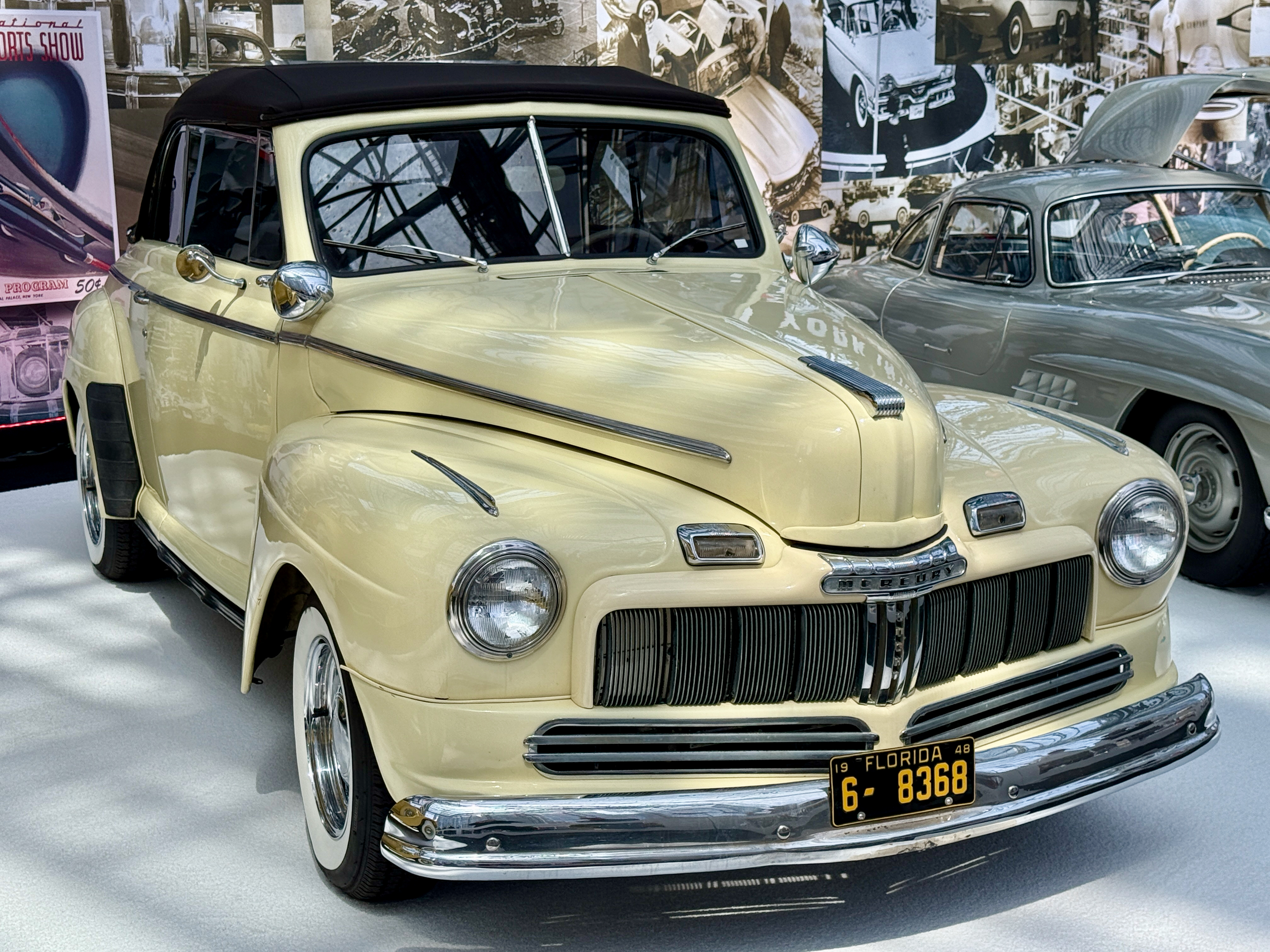
1947 Mercury Eight Convertible

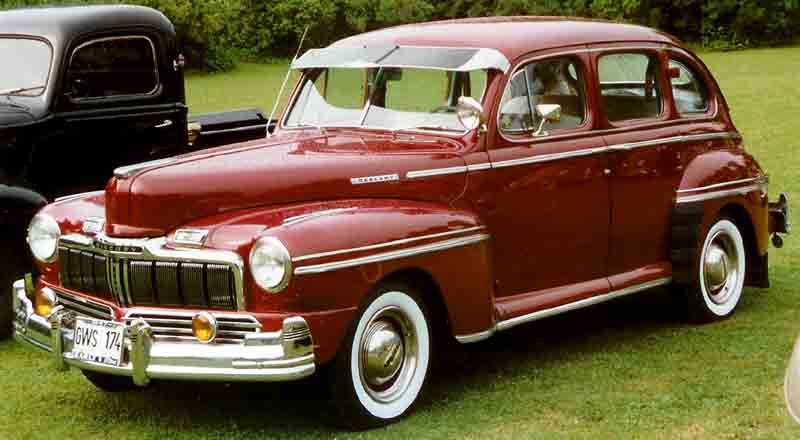
1947 Mercury Eight Town Sedan

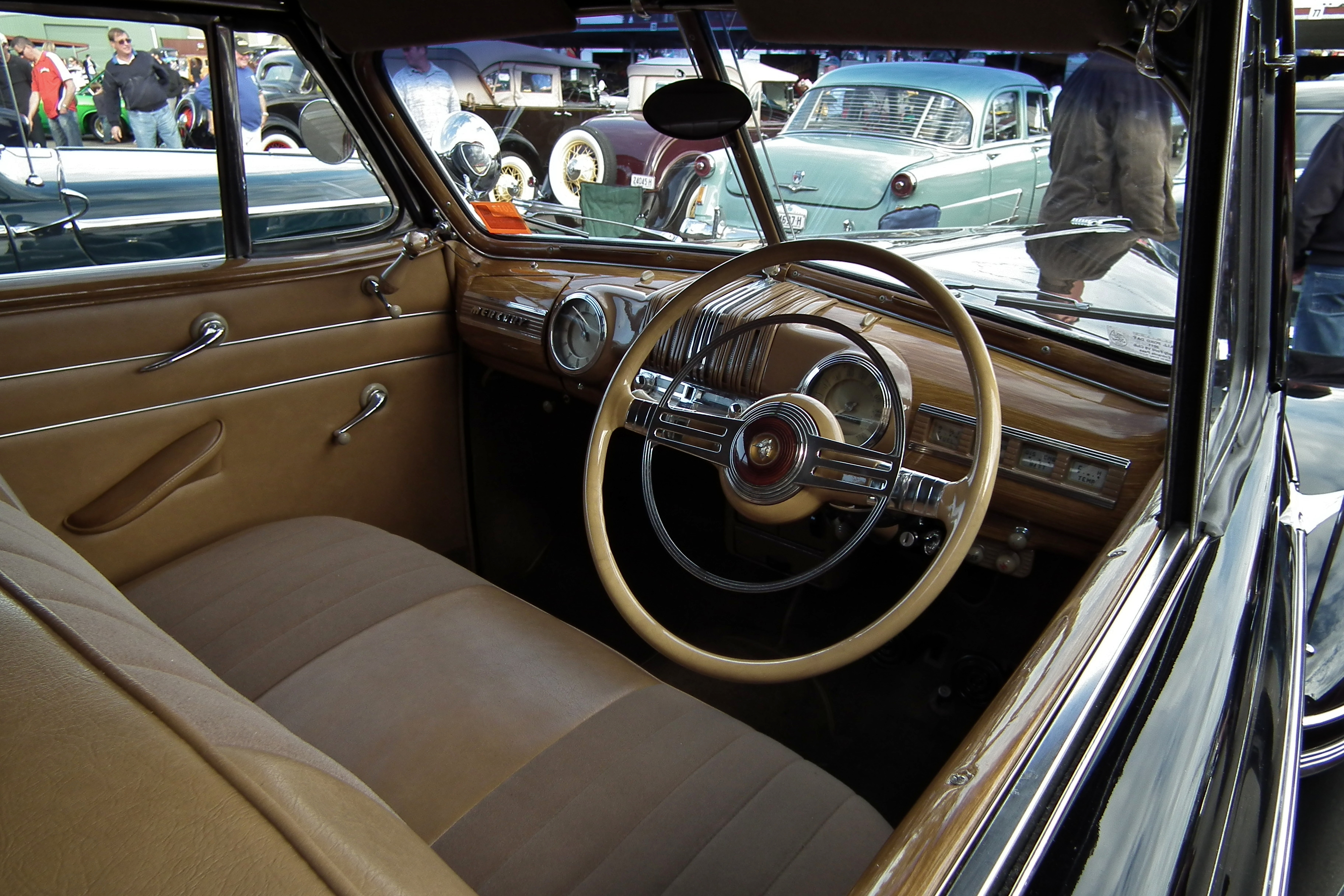
1947 Mercury Eight convertible interior

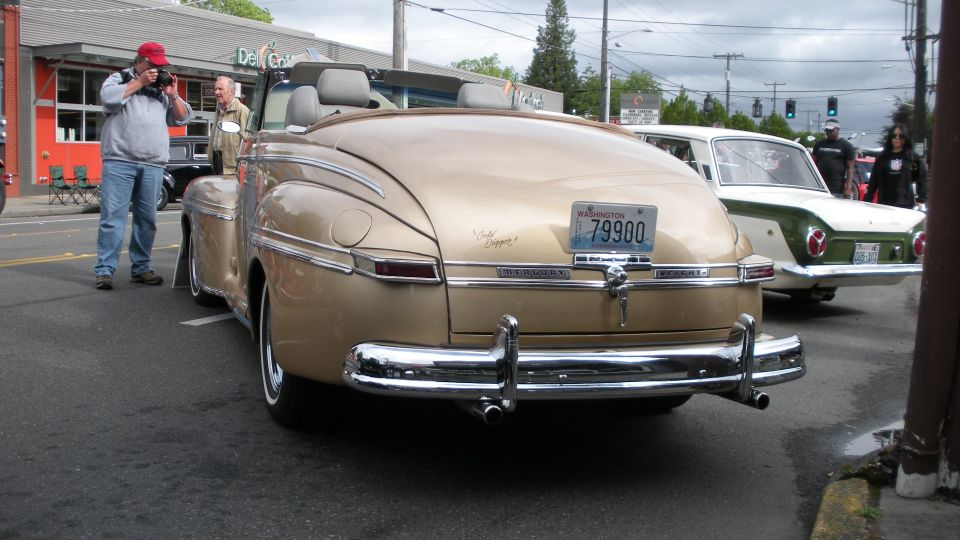
1948 Mercury Eight convertible rear

The 1941 Mercury Eight got all-new styling and some engineering improvements. The Mercury now shared its bodyshell with the Ford Super DeLuxe and the wheelbase was expanded by 2.0 in (51 mm) to 118.0 in (2,997 mm). There were many chassis refinements, including improved spring lengths, rates, and deflections, plus changes in shackling, shocks, and an improved stabilizer bar, but the old fashioned transverse springs were still used. The new body featured door bottoms that flared out over the running boards, allowing for wider seats and interiors. The car had 2.0 in (51 mm) more headroom, two-piece front fenders (three-piece at first), and more glass area. The front pillars were made slimmer and the windshield was widened, deepened, and angled more steeply. Parking lights were separate and set atop the fenders for greater visibility. Headlight bezels were redesigned. In all closed Mercurys the rear-quarter windows opened out. Front vent wings were now crank-operated, and in closed cars the ventilation wing support bars rolled down with the windows. The 4-door convertible, offered in 1940, was gone, but a station wagon was added. The woodie wagon's body behind the engine cowl was identical to Ford's, and produced at the company's Iron Mountain plant in Michigan's Upper Peninsula. The "Eight" script was moved to the rear of the hood. 90,556 Mercury Eights were sold in the 1941 model year.

In 1942 the Mercury Eight's slender bullet parking lights were replaced with rectangular units placed high on the fenders inboard of the headlights. Running boards were now completely concealed under flared door bottoms. The instrument panel now features two identical circles for speedometer and clock with gauges to the left of the speedometer, a glove compartment to the right of the clock, and a large radio speaker cover in the center. The grille looked more like that of the Lincoln-Zephyr and Continental. The "Eight" script was gone but an "8" appeared at the top of the grille center. Horsepower was increased to 100. Mercury's biggest engineering news for 1942 was "Liquamatic", Ford's first semiautomatic transmission. It was unsuccessful and Mercury would not have another automatic transmission until Merc-O-Matic appeared in 1951, which was a true automatic. Mercury production for the short 1942 model year totaled only 1,902. Output was halted in February 1942 as American auto plants were converted to the exclusive production of war material.

Although Mercury's prewar history was short, the Mercury Eight had already earned for itself the image of being a fine performer in mph as well as mpg, this "hot car" image quite in keeping with its name, chosen by Edsel Ford, that of the fleet-footed messenger of the gods of Roman mythology. The Mercury Eight was strongly identified as an upmarket Ford during this period. In 1945 the Lincoln-Mercury division would be established to change that.

A new grille was the most noticeable difference between the 1942 and 1946 Mercurys. It had thin vertical bars surrounded by a trim piece painted the same color as the car. An "Eight" script now appeared down its center. The Liquimatic automatic transmission option was eliminated. The most distinctive new Mercury was the Sportsman convertible. It featured wood body panels. Only 205 examples of it were produced and it was discontinued the following model year. Mercury Eight sales totaled 86,603.

Styling changes were slight in 1947. The Mercury name was placed on the side of the hood. Different hubcaps were used. The border around the grille was chrome plated. The "Eight" script still ran down its center. There was also new trunk trim. More chrome was used on the interior and the dash dial faces were redesigned. The convertible and station wagon came with leather upholstery. The other body styles used fabric. The wood paneled Sportsman convertible was gone. 86,363 Mercury Eights were sold.

For all practical purposes the 1948 Mercury Eights were identical to the 1947s. The major changes consisted of different dial faces and no steering column lock. 50,268 Mercury Eights were sold.

=== Australian coupe utility and panel van variants ===
A unique coupe utility variant of the Mercury was produced in Australia from 1946 to 1948. Marketed as the Mercury Club Coupe Utility, it was built on a 118-inch wheelbase and had a carrying capacity rated at 10–12 cwt. The 1946 version was coded as the Model S9A and the 1947 and 1948 variants as the Model 6M.

A panel van model was also offered.

== Third generation (1949–1951) ==
Third generation
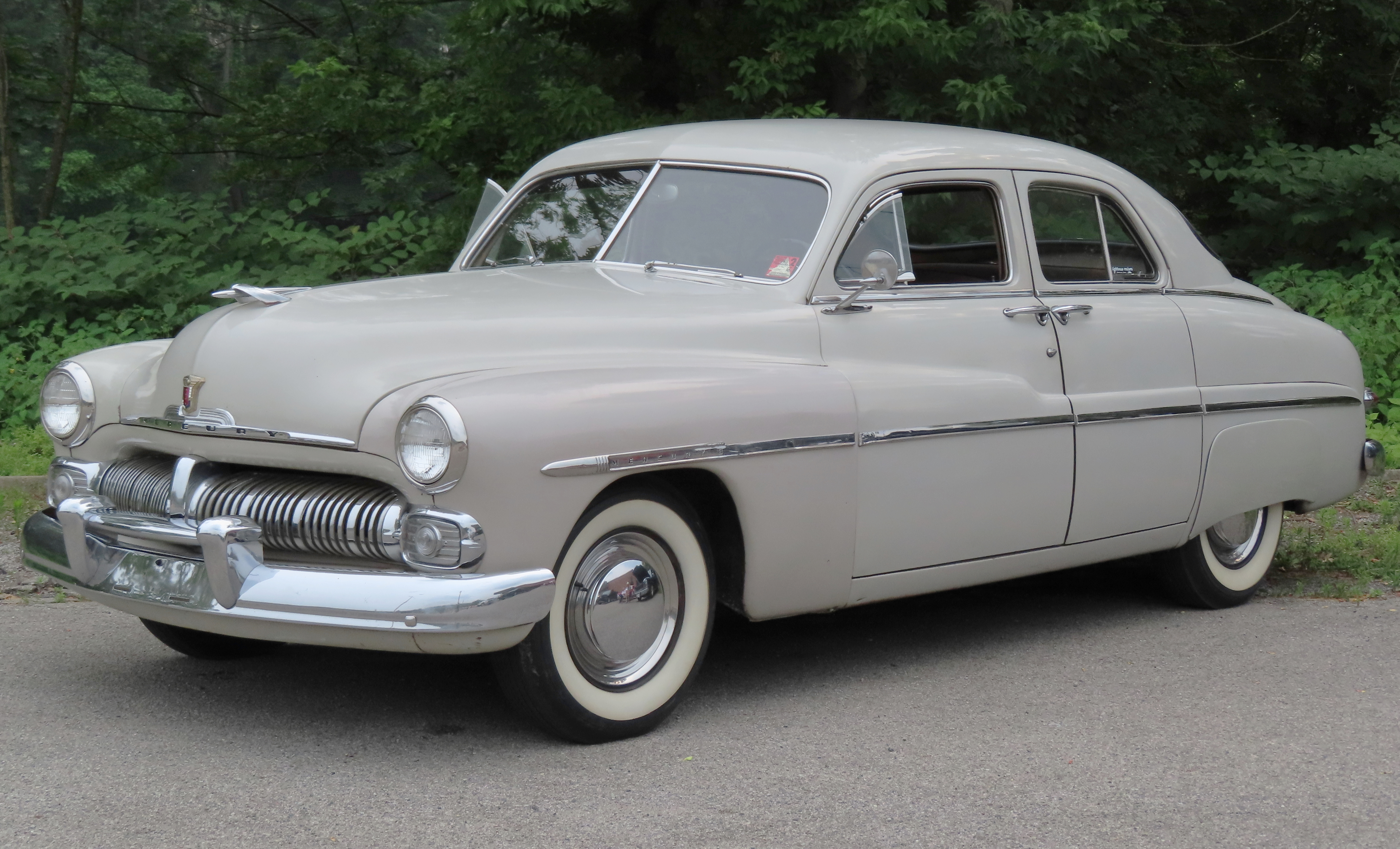
- 1950 Mercury Eight Sport Sedan

Overview
- Also called: Mercury Monterey
- Model years: 1949–1951

Body and chassis
- Body style: 2-door coupe; 2-door Monterey coupe; 2-door convertible; 4-door sedan; 2-door station wagon
- Related: Lincoln EL-series

Powertrain
- Engine: 255 cu in (4.2 L) Flathead V8
- Transmission: 3-speed manual transmission 3-speed Merc-O-Matic automatic

Dimensions
- Wheelbase: 118.0 in (2,997 mm)
- Length: 206.8 in (5,253 mm)
- Width: 76.5 in (1,943 mm)
- Height: 64.8 in (1,646 mm)
- Curb weight: 3,500–4,000 lb (1,600–1,800 kg)

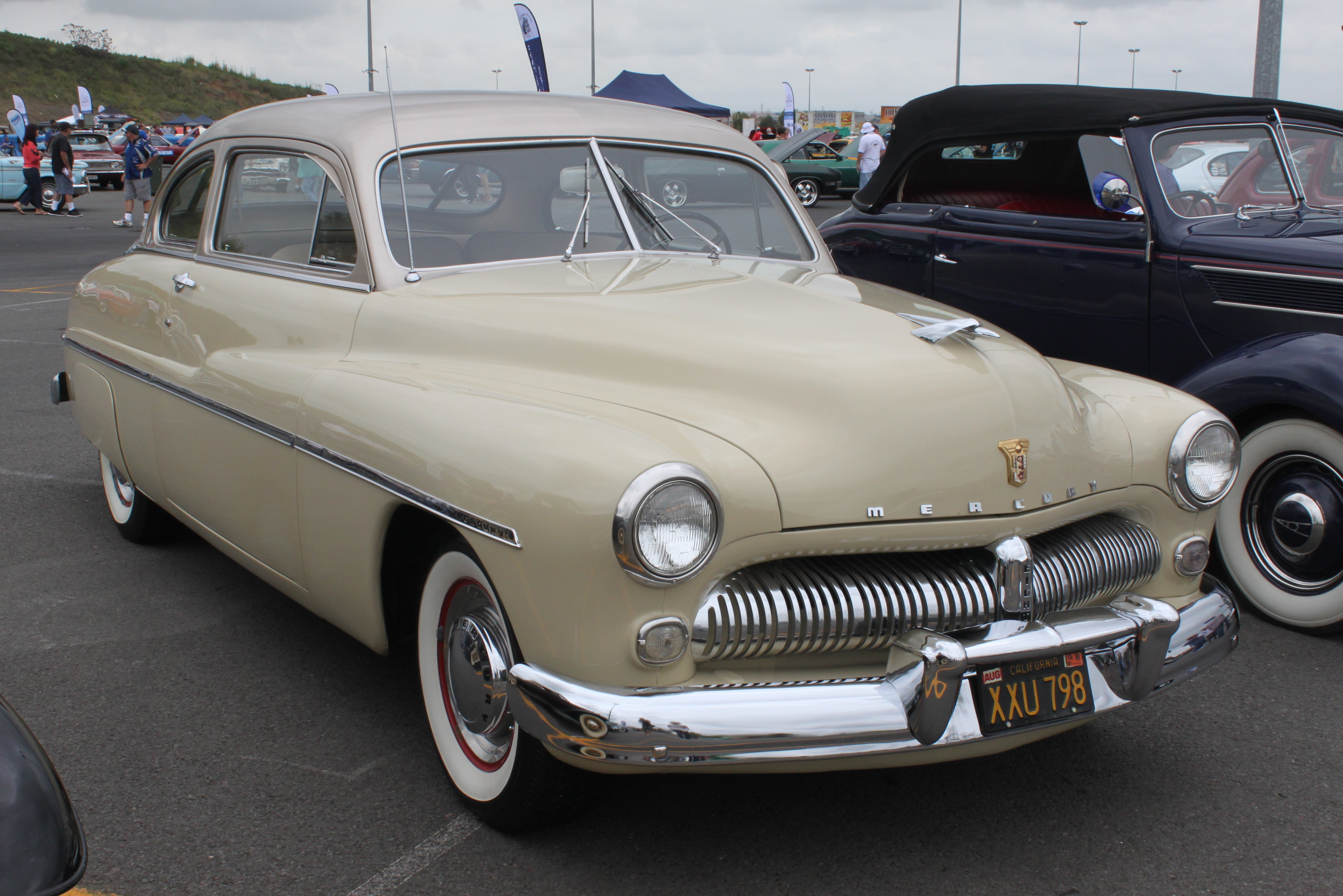
1949 Mercury Eight Coupe

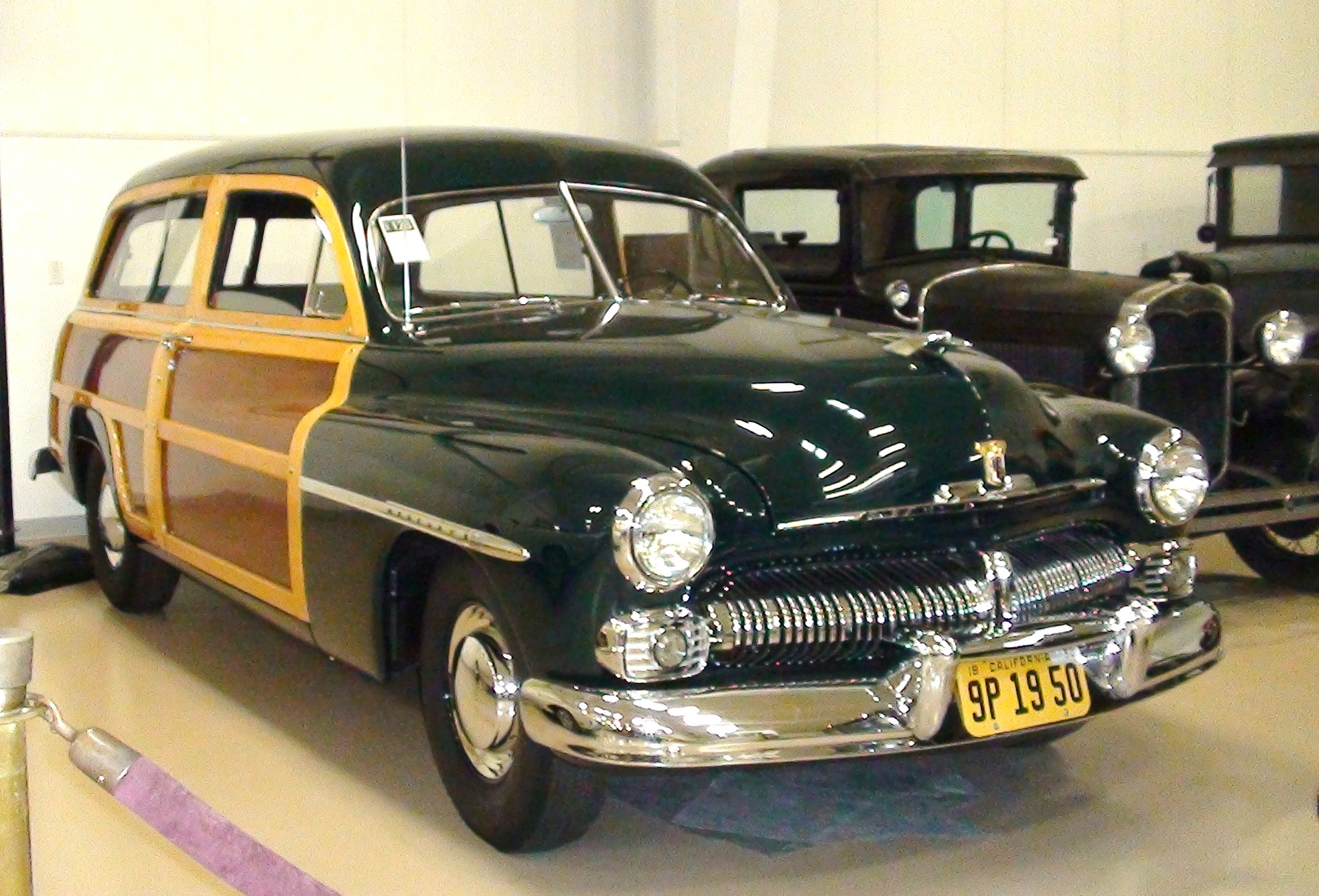
1950 Mercury Eight station wagon

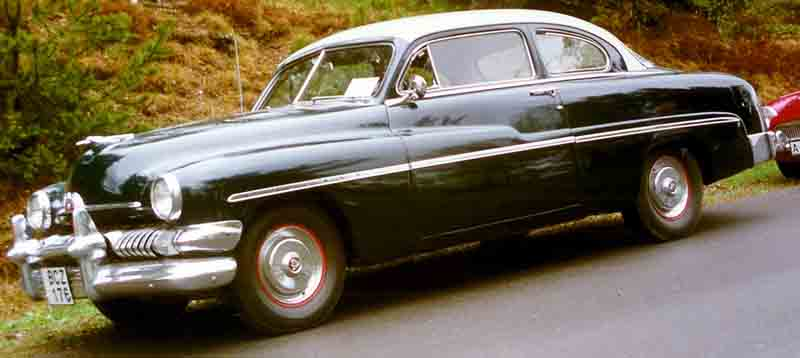
1951 Mercury Eight coupe

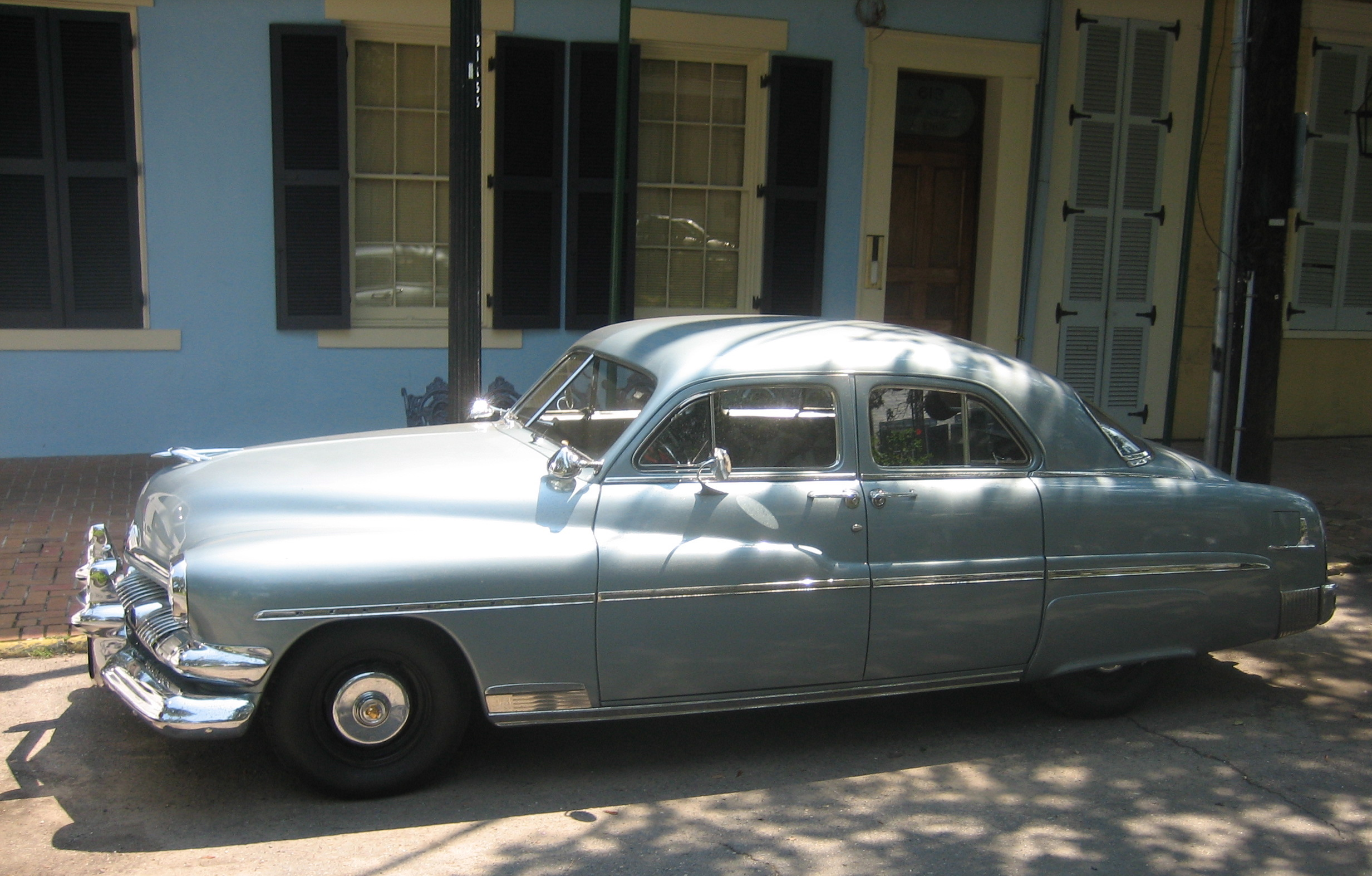
1951 Mercury Eight with suicide doors

For 1949, Mercury introduced its third-generation design as its first postwar line. The first models released under the combined Lincoln-Mercury Division, the Mercury Eight now shared its body with the Lincoln (which no longer carried a divisional nameplate).

Keeping its 118-inch wheelbase, the third-generation Mercury was sized between its two divisional counterparts. The "pontoon" body design eliminated freestanding fenders and running boards (along with widening and lowering the hood). Substantial modernization was made to the chassis, as Ford retired its long-running transverse-leaf suspension and torque-tube drive axle (the former feature, used since 1908 on the Model T). While the rear axle was remained leaf-sprung (with more conventional longitudinal springs), the front suspension was independent with stabilizer bars.

The Flathead V8 (resized to 255 cubic inches) made its return, producing 110 hp. A new overdrive system was optional, activated by a handle under the dash.

In a model change, the four-door station wagon was replaced by a two-door version; as with the Ford Country Squire, wood construction was relegated to side paneling (still manufactured at the Ford Iron Mountain Plant). An 8 tube AM radio was introduced as an option; full instrumentation was added to the dashboard.

For 1950, the Mercury Monterey made its debut as the flagship version of the Mercury Eight. Developed in response to the two-door hardtop coupes introduced by General Motors, the Monterey was a counterpart of the Ford Crestliner, Lincoln Lido, and Lincoln Cosmopolitan Capri, featuring a fabric-covered roof and upgraded interior.

For 1951, the Mercury saw minor styling revisions, but introduced the Merc-O-Matic 3-speed automatic as an option (identical to the Ford-O-Matic introduced alongside it).

The shift from the Ford to the Lincoln body proved successful for Mercury, increasing sales by over 250,000 vehicles from 1948 to 1949, with the brand becoming the sixth-best selling automobile in the United States. For 1952, Mercury redesigned and expanded its model line, renaming the Eight as the Mercury Custom and establishing the Monterey as its flagship nameplate.

=== Custom car legacy ===
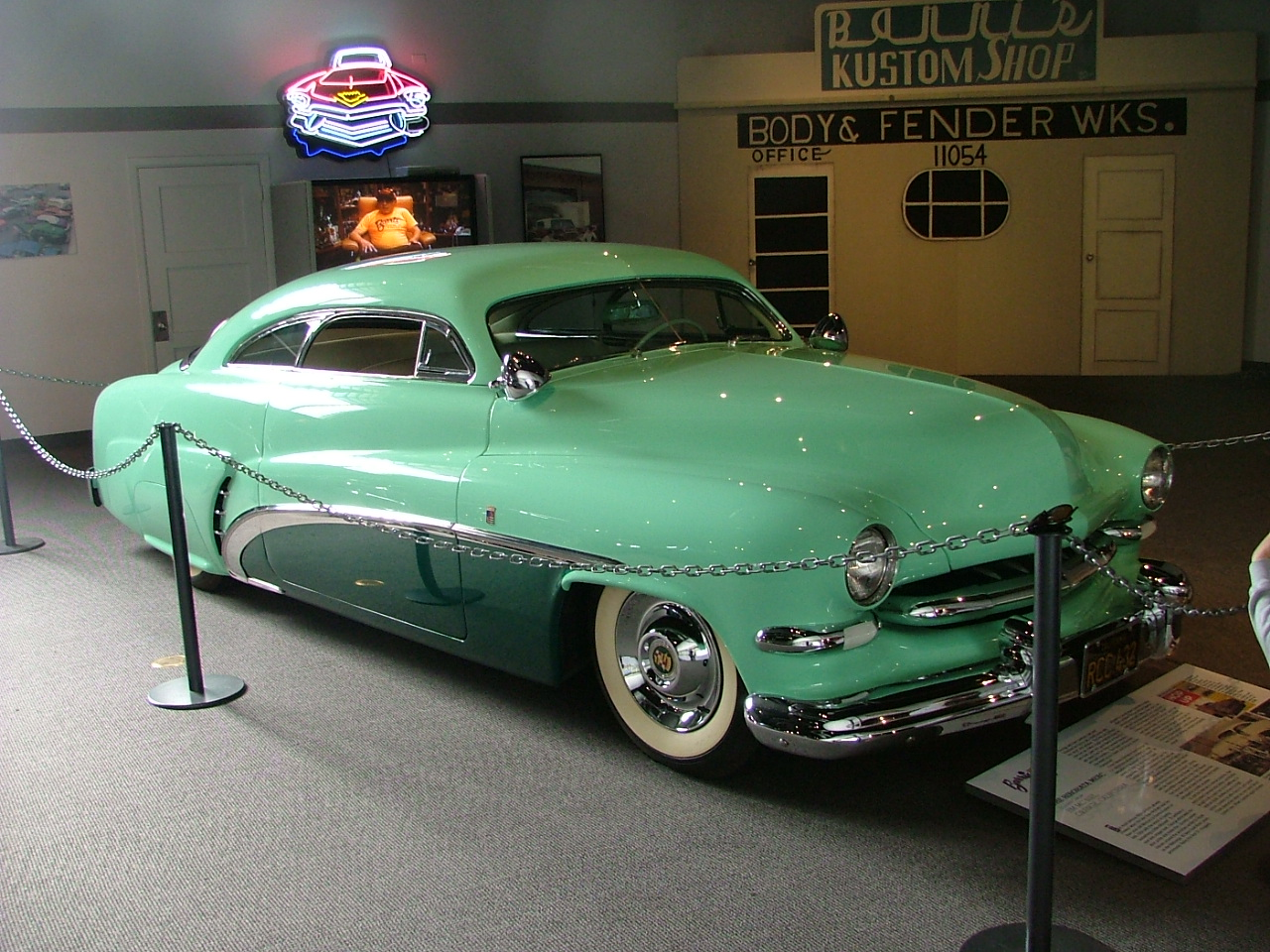
One of the famous American custom cars, the Hirohata Merc, was based on a 1951 Mercury Club Coupe

Within its era and beyond, the third-generation Mercury Eight was popular with customizers. In 1949, Sam Barris built the first lead sled from a 1949 Mercury Eight; the Eight became the definitive "lead sled", much as the Ford V-8 (as the "deuce") was becoming the definitive hot rod. The Eights were among the first models to receive an aftermarket OHV engine swap, since Oldsmobile and Cadillac developed the first high-compression OHV V8 engines in 1949, whereas Ford was still using a sidevalve engine.

Sam and George Barris also used the 1949 body style to build "the most famous custom car ever", the Hirohata Merc, for customer Bob Hirohata in 1953. Setting a style and an attitude, it had a "momentous effect" on custom car builders, appeared in several magazines at the time, and reappeared numerous times since, earning an honorable mention on Rod & Custom's "Twenty Best of All Time" list in 1991.

The Eight remains a very popular subject for car modellers. In 1990, Hot Wheels created the Purple Passion, a model based on the 1949 Mercury with a chopped top. Fiberglass replicas of the Eight, inspired by Sam Barris's car, are still in production and are popular with custom and rod enthusiasts.

== See also ==
- Appleton spotlights
- Lead sled
