= Chopping and channeling =

Form of automobile customization

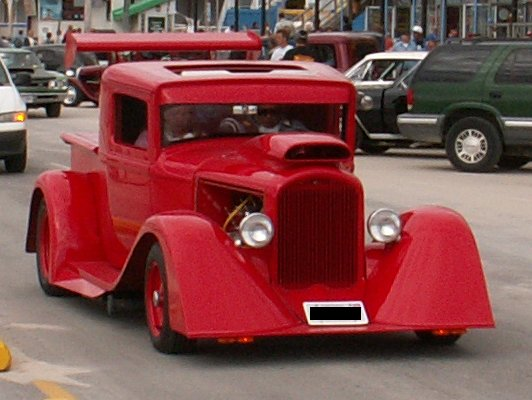
Ford pickup with chopped top

Chopping and channeling is a form of automobile customization in the "kustom kulture" and among hot rodders. The procedures are often combined, but can be performed separately. While chopping takes in only a car's pillars and windows, the more involved work of sectioning a car is carried out on the entire lower body.

== Chopping ==
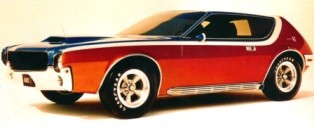
A chopped top on an AMX GT show car that was built using a 1968 AMC Javelin production car

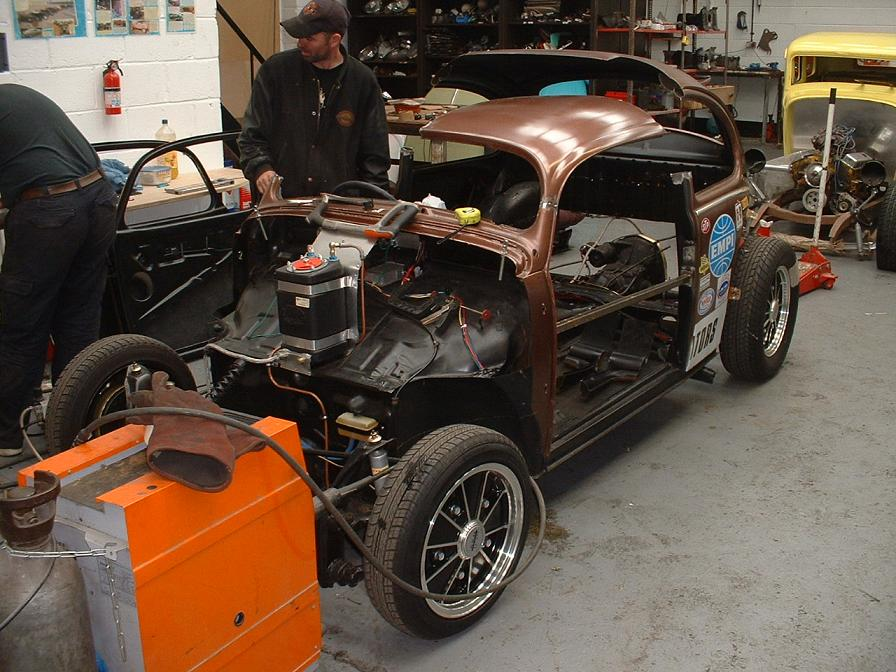
Chopping the top of a VW Beetle - the C-pillar is unfinished

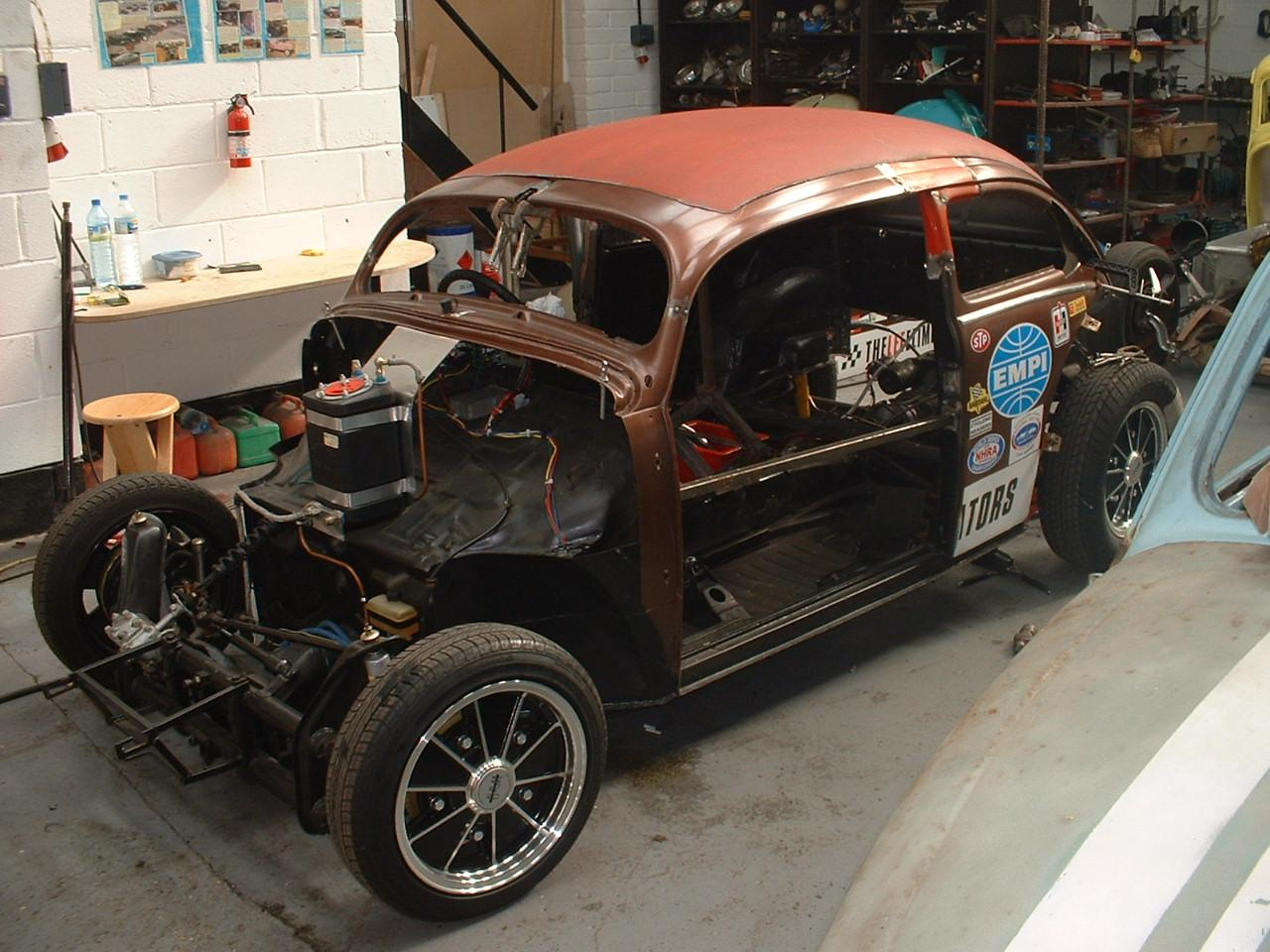
In this picture the chop is almost complete. Note how much smaller the rear side windows are when compared to a stock Beetle

Chopping a car, known more fully as "chopping the top," goes back to the early days of hot rodding and is an attempt to reduce the frontal profile of a car and increase its speed potential. To chop a roof, a shop cuts down the pillars and windows, lowering the overall roofline. Some racers on the dry lakes chopped the tops of their cars so severely that the windows were only a few inches tall, and sometimes called "mail slot" windows. Roof chopping became popular with drag racers for much the same reasons as it did for lakes racers, and was applied also to custom cars, kustoms, and lead sleds. The first roof chopper is considered to be Sam Barris (brother of auto customizer George Barris), who chopped and customized his brand new 1949 Mercury. Barris also pioneered a more advanced form, removing the B-pillar and turning the car into a pillarless hardtop in the process.

Automakers themselves may lower the roofs of concept cars based on production models, as AMC did with its AMX-GT, to make them look sleeker and "racy", even if impractical for normal use.

== Channeling ==
Channeling is a modification that can be applied to cars with body-on-frame construction. To channel a car, a shop lifts its body temporarily off of its ladder or perimeter frame, cuts loose the floor and refastens it higher inside the body, and then lowers the body back over the frame. Thus, the entire body rests closer to the ground without alterations to the suspension, giving the car a lower profile. In some instances, shops must also modify chassis components, and so may be constrained by local laws as well as safety considerations. Channeling is popular among hot rod, lead sled, and minitruck enthusiasts, the last calling it body drop.

== Sectioning ==
Sectioning a car is removing a horizontal section from its lower body, lowering the remaining top section onto the bottom one, and welding the result back together, reducing the body's and thus the car's overall height. Like a top chop, it has the advantage of reducing a car's frontal area and wind resistance. This sort of bodywork is popular on minitrucks, race cars, customs, and lead sleds.
