= Appleton spotlight =

Bullet-shaped automobile spotlights

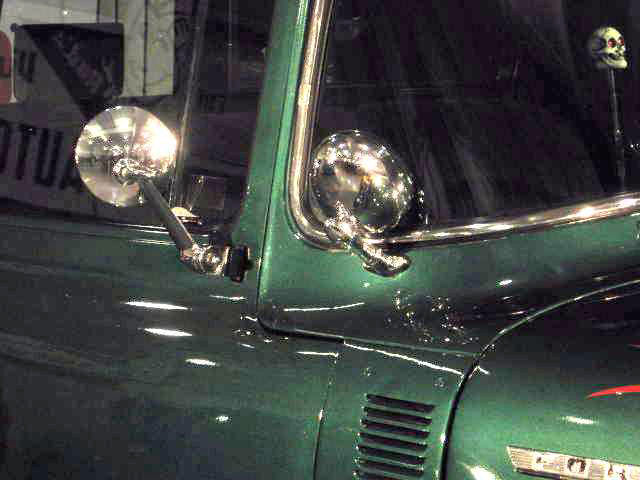
Appleton spotlight on a 1956 Ford

Appleton spotlights, or simply Appletons, were a common feature in early automobiles, up to the muscle car era. The bullet-shaped spotlights (usually installed in pairs) included a handle which was mounted through the side window pillar of the cab (just above the hood) into the interior of the vehicle. This allowed an occupant to maneuver the direction or focus of the spotlight beam with a simple twisting motion. Appleton spotlights, marked with an embossed oval around the brand name, Appleton, were often found on pre-1960 vehicles (especially on service vehicles—police, armed forces, mail vehicles, etc.), but were also an often-added, after-market automobile accessory. They became so popular during the 1940s and 1950s for custom car enthusiasts, that "dummy" spots were commonly installed.
