= The Mantaray (show rod) =

One-of-a-kind experimental car

Overview
- Production: 1963
- Designer: Dean Jeffries

Body and chassis
- Body style: Bubble canopy coupe

Powertrain
- Engine: V8 Cobra
- Transmission: 4-speed manual

The Mantaray is a show rod built in 1963 by Dean Jeffries. The car won Best Experimental in its debut at the 1964 Pomona car show (at the Winternationals) and the special constructor's award, top non-roadster prize, at the 1964 Oakland Roadster Show. It also appeared on "The Tonight Show" with Steve Allen, Bikini Beach and The Monkees (TV series) season 2 episode titled "Monkees Race Again."

== Construction details ==
Based on a pre-World War II Maserati racing car, it had a wire-mesh "cage" with the body laid over the bare space frame, with air intakes in the rear quarter panels ahead of the wheels.

The car had open wheels and exposed carburetor velocity stacks, as well as exposed distributor. It was painted white. It had lakes pipes.

Like a number of other show rods at the time, including Silhouette, it had a bubble canopy.

== History ==
Mantaray began as a gift from Jeffries' father-in-law: a pre-World War II Maserati racing car. Jeffries built a wire-mesh "cage" and laid the body over the bare space frame.

After the car was completed, it won the Best Experimental car award at the 1964 Pomona car show (at the Winternationals). It then won the special constructor's award, top prize for a non-roadster, at the 1964 Oakland Roadster Show. It also appeared on Steve Allen's "The Tonight Show", which led to the producers of Bikini Beach using it in their film. Though customs such as Ala Kart and the Hirohata Merc had appeared in film before, Mantaray was the first to get appreciable time on screen. (A decade later, Pete Chapouris' California Kid would have a starring role.)

Following its use in the film, Mantaray was sent for measuring by AMT, for a prospective model kit.
