= Mantooth =

Mantooth is a surname. Notable people with the surname include:

- Randolph Mantooth (1945-2026), an American actor
- Donald Mantooth (born 1952), an American actor, brother of Randolph

== Fictional characters ==
- Wes Mantooth, a rival newscaster from the film Anchorman: The Legend of Ron Burgundy, portrayed by Vince Vaughn, and his mother Dorothy.
