= Jim Jacobs (customizer) =

American Hot rodder and customizer

Jim Jacobs, commonly known by his nickname, "Jake', is an American Hot rodder and customizer.

Jacobs built a yellow 1933 Ford 3-window coupé featured on the cover of Custom Rod in November 1973, along with a similar '34 built by Pete Chapouris.

The coincidence would lead them to form a partnership, Pete and Jake's Hot Rod Shop in Temple City, California, in 1974.
