= Pete Chapouris =

American hot rodder and customizer

Pete Chapouris (16 December 1942 – 6 January 2017) was an American hot rodder and customizer. He is best known for creating The California Kid '34 3-window, and also as partner in Pete & Jake's Hot Rod Shop.

== History ==
Chapouris began his hot rodding career in the 1950s in Southern California, where he was a member of the Vintage Tin Hot Rod Club. He is best known for the '34 Ford 3-window The California Kid, featured on the cover of Custom Rod (along with a similar coupé built by Jim Jacobs) in November 1973 and in the movie of the same name in 1974. The California Kid became one of the most-often copied hot rods ever.

The magazine cover led to a partnership with the builder of the other cover car, Jim "Jake" Jacobs, and the creation of their speed shop, Pete and Jake's Hot Rod Shop in Temple City, California, in 1974. Chapouris was also SEMA Vice President of Marketing. He died on 6 January 2017, from a stroke. He also helped re-establish So-Cal Speed Shop which to this day is thriving due to new ownership.
