= Dean Jeffries =

Hollywood custom vehicle designer

- Born: Edward Dean Jeffries; February 25, 1933; Osage, Iowa
- Died: May 5, 2013 (aged 80); Hollywood, California
- Education: Self-educated
- Known for: hot rod art, automobile customizing and pinstriping
- Notable work: Monkeemobile
- Movement: Kustom Kulture

Edward Dean Jeffries (February 25, 1933 – May 5, 2013) was an American custom car designer and fabricator, as well as stuntman and stunt coordinator for motion pictures and television programs based in Los Angeles, California.

== Early life ==
Jeffries was born to Viola Irene (née Allison) and Edward James Jeffries in Osage, Iowa. After the family moved to Compton, California, Jeffries grew up in Compton and then neighboring Lynwood, California, where his father was a mechanic. He was the middle child, born between older sister Darlene Ann (b. May 18, 1931, Osage, Iowa-) and younger sister Evonne Mae (b. December 2, 1935, in Osage, Iowa). A brother, James Eddie, was born December 2, 1935, in Osage, a twin to Evonne, but died the next day.

Jeffries served in the United States Army during the Korean War, stationed in Germany. While in Germany he saw fellow soldiers and locals custom painting their motorcycles, and this led him to pinstriping. As a young man, after returning from Germany, he started doing pinstriping on the side, while working as a grinder in a machine shop. As the striping took off he opened a custom pinstriping shop that would become famous with the Hollywood film industry.

== Career ==
A neighbor of Jeffries, race car driver Troy Ruttman befriended him, and they worked on cars together. After Ruttman joined with J. C. Agajanian, the Indianapolis 500 race team and Ascot Speedway owner, Agajanian hired Jeffries to stripe and letter his cars in 1953.

Actor James Dean was one of his early customers, and Jeffries painted "Little Bastard" on Dean's Porsche 550 Spyder. Jeffries recalled the day in September, 1955: "Jimmy knew that I was a pinstriper and had met me through Lance Reventlow and Bruce Kessler. He drove to my Lynwood shop in his new 550 and asked me to paint a temporary number 130 on the front hood, rear deck lid, and both doors of the Spyder in flat black, washable paint. He also asked me to paint "Little Bastard" on the tail section in the same font script. I painted it with One Shot, a gloss black enamel paint, as this would be permanent. It turned out great. Jimmy thought that the "Little Bastard" looked so cool across the bottom of the tail section."

As an extra reward for working on his cars, and to have him on hand there, Agajanian took Jeffries to the 1952 Indy 500. Noticing his unusual painting and pinstriping style, Mobil Oil hired him in the following years to paint many of the Indy race cars. It was free to the teams and Mobil got their logo somewhere on the car. Jeffries would paint and pinstripe the cars and helmets of race car drivers like Jim Rathmann, Parnelli Jones, and A. J. Foyt, and became Foyt's paint and body man. After that, in 1962, he worked for famous race car designer and builder Carroll Shelby on the Cobra. He would go on to become one of the best custom car painters of the late 1950s and early 1960s, and an early pioneer of painting flames on cars. He also developed his own paint, Jeffries Indy Pearl.

Jeffries was a certified welder and custom-built vehicles used in numerous Hollywood productions through his company, Dean Jeffries Automotive Styling, in Los Angeles.

He began custom fabrication in the 1960s, expanding his premises three times in the decade. He built The Mantaray (which took the Best Experimental car award at the 1964 Pomona car show and appeared on Steve Allen's The Tonight Show, and in Bikini Beach), Python (a prototype for Ford), Black Beauty (from The Green Hornet), the Monkeemobile, the Landmaster from Damnation Alley (1977), the Moon buggy (that James Bond steals in Diamonds Are Forever), the trolley (from Who Framed Roger Rabbit). Jeffries was also an expert on dune buggies, produced his own models, and has contributed to books about them. He did all of the custom fabrication work on the movie Convoy in Albuquerque, New Mexico, where he rented the shop from Burns Truck & Parts. Jeffries is credited as the constructor of the five cars attempting to drive across the U.S. in the 1975 film, Death Race 2000.

In 1996, the owner of Black Beauty hired Jeffries to do a complete restoration. In 1999, it sold for US$100,000.

Jeffries worked on the design and initial fabrication for the Batmobile (for the 1966 Batman TV series), but when the studio wanted the car sooner than he could deliver, he turned the project over to George Barris who hired Bill Cushenbery to perform the fabrication work.

In 2001, the Cruisin' Hall of Fame inducted Jeffries as a member.

== Personal life ==
Jeffries married Judy Darlene Maxson (born July 23, 1940) in c.1959, daughter of Helen C. (née Harrington) and Darwin Bashor Maxson. Judy's father, Darwin, would become a racing partner with Dean, forming Maxson Jeffries Racing. Dean and Judy had one son, Kevin Dean (born November 24, 1960-), but divorced in April 1971.

While working on the Warner Bros. lot he met and later married Rosalee "Row" Berman in Los Angeles on October 17, 1982. Berman was an executive and associate producer for the studio. Berman, who was born July 20, 1941, died after a long illness on August 11, 2008, in Los Angeles at the age of 67.

Jeffries died in his sleep May 5, 2013, at home in Hollywood. He was 80 and had been in declining health.

== Television (Car Customizer) ==
- The Green Hornet - Car Designer for The Black Beauty - 26 episodes (uncredited) (1967)
- The Monkees - Monkeemobile stylist - 58 episodes (1966–1968)
- Logan's Run - various futuristic hover cars etc. - 14 episodes (1977–1978)
- Get a Life - designer of the Paperboy 2000 vehicle featured in season 1 episode 6, "Paperboy 2000"

== Miscellaneous and as stunt man ==
- Chesty Anderson U.S. Navy - stunt driver (1976)
- The Blues Brothers - stunt man (1980)
- Romancing the Stone - stunt man (1984)
- The Rookie - stunt man (1990)
- The Fugitive - stunt man (1993)
- Die Hard: With a Vengeance - stunt man (1995)
- The Black Beauty - Video featurette - Himself (2000)
- TV's Greatest Cars - TV Movie documentary - Himself (2004)
- TV Land's Top Ten - episode - Top 10 TV Cars - Himself (2004)
- American Icon: The Hot Rod - episode - Through a Windshield Darkly: Innovation in the 1960s - Himself (2010)
- American Icon: The Hot Rod - episode - Making the Scene: Hot Rod Culture and the Rise of Customizing - Himself (2010)

== Gallery ==
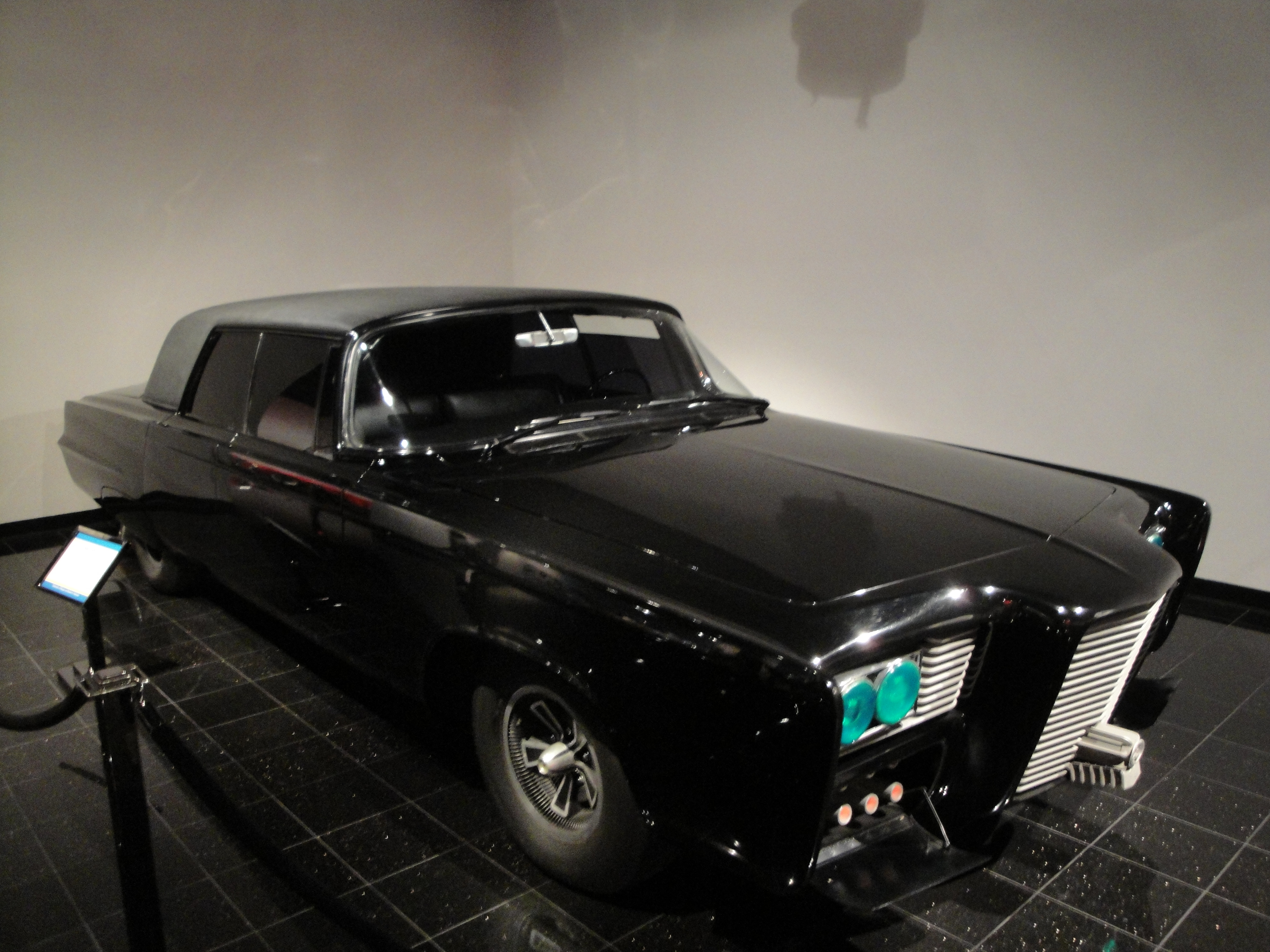
Black Beauty from The Green Hornet (TV series)

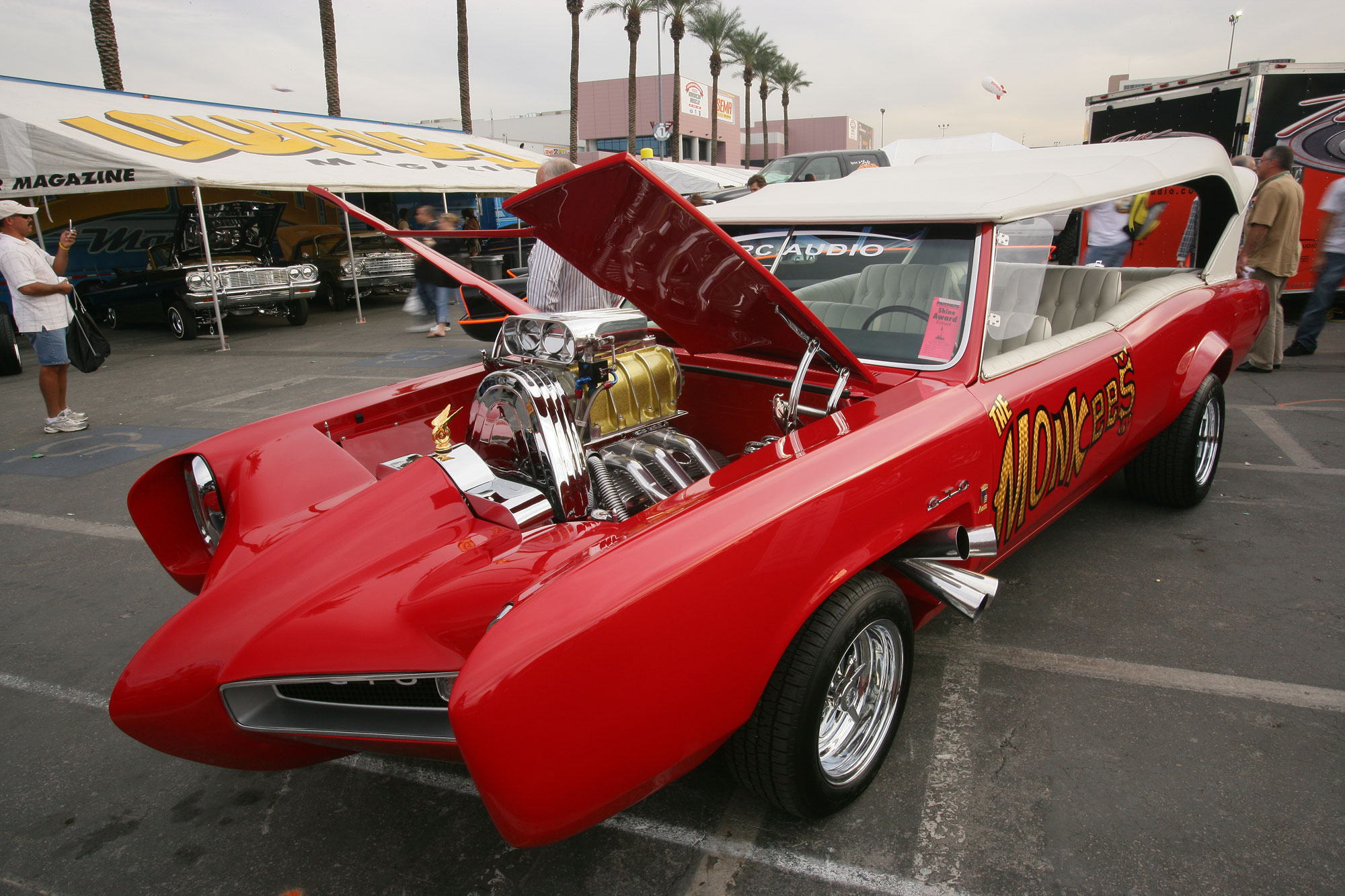
Monkeemobile for The Monkees TV series

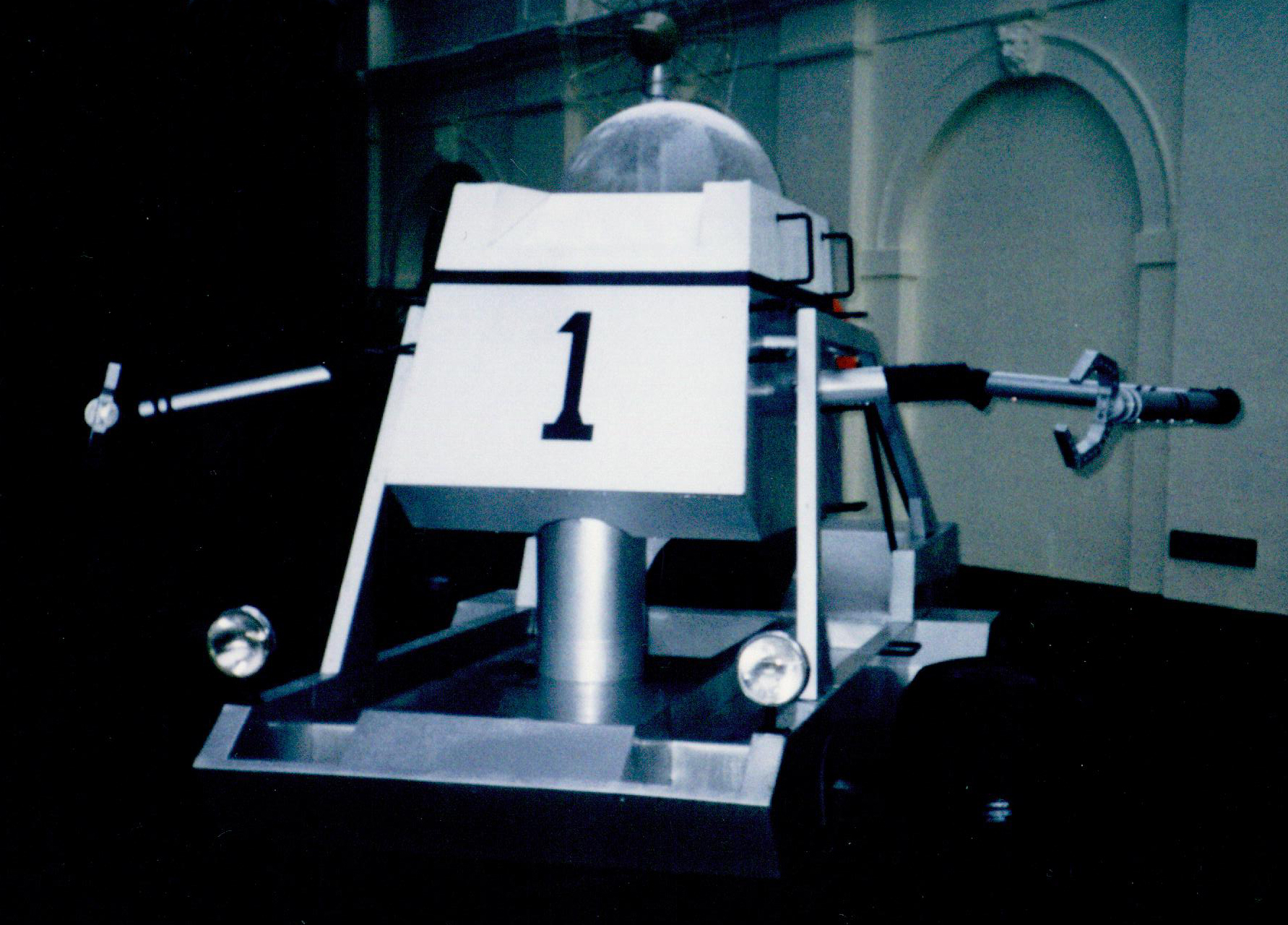
Moonbuggy from Diamonds Are Forever (film)
