= The California Kid =

1974 film by Richard T. Heffron

- Film poster
- Genre: Action; Thriller
- Written by: Richard Compton
- Directed by: Richard T. Heffron
- Starring: Martin Sheen; Vic Morrow; Michelle Philips; Nick Nolte; Stuart Margolin
- Music by: Luchi De Jesus
- Country of origin: United States
- Original language: English

Production
- Executive producer: Paul Mason
- Producer: Howie Horwitz
- Production locations: Piru, California; Ojai, California
- Cinematography: Terry K. Meade
- Editors: Robert F. Shugrue; Richard Belding
- Running time: 74 minutes
- Production company: Universal Television

Original release
- Network: ABC
- Release: September 25, 1974

The California Kid is a 1974 American made-for-television action thriller film broadcast on the anthology series, ABC Movie of the Week. It was directed by Richard T. Heffron and starred Martin Sheen and Michelle Phillips.

== Plot ==
In 1958, two Navy sailors on leave (one portrayed by Sheen's younger brother, Joe Estevez) are speeding in a 1951 Ford Custom to get back to base on time. When driving through Clarksberg, a town infamous for speed traps, they are pursued at high speed by Sheriff Roy Childress (Vic Morrow), who pushes their car over the edge of a sharp mountain curve with his 1957 Plymouth Belvedere police car, killing them.

Soon after, a stranger named Michael McCord (Martin Sheen) drives into town in a hot rodded black 1934 Ford three-window coupe, known as "The California Kid". McCord is pulled over by the sheriff for speeding and establishes himself with the sheriff as a hot rodder and reckless driver, boasting that his car can hit 75 miles per hour (121 km/h) in 10 seconds. McCord pleads guilty in front of Judge J.A. Hooker (Frederic Downs) and pays the ticket.

McCord later gets coffee at a local diner where Childress and Hooker are also eating. As the sheriff and waitress Maggie (Michelle Phillips) look on, McCord clips a newspaper article, places it on the counter, and leaves. The sheriff sees that McCord chose an article about the sailors' crash (its headline revealing that there have been 7 fatalities on the mountainous curves that year). Childress returns to the station to review the accident report and realizes that one of the sailors killed in the crash was also named McCord.

McCord finds the sailors' wrecked car at the impound yard and sees that its rear bumper was dented by pushbars, reinforcing his growing suspicion that the crash was not an accident. He also repeatedly drives through the curves at the scene of the crash to familiarize himself with the road and his car, tuning his vehicle to better handle the curves. Maggie tells McCord that Childress has not been the same since his wife and son were killed by a hit and run driver five years earlier.

Lyle Stafford (Gary Morgan), the younger brother of the town's auto mechanic Buzz Stafford (Nick Nolte), is killed and his girlfriend Sissy (Janit Baldwin) badly injured after Childress pursues their 1955 Mercury for speeding and runs it off the same curve. Buzz wants to kill Childress in revenge, but McCord convinces him to hold off, revealing that one of the sailors was his younger brother. Childress, aware that McCord is on to him, orders McCord to leave town.

On his way out of town, McCord finds the sheriff waiting for him and goads him into giving chase. Childress tries to run him off the cliff, but McCord is unfazed, having modified his vehicle for the mountain roads. As Buzz and the sheriff's deputy look on, Childress loses control at the same treacherous curve and plummets over the cliff, becoming a victim of his own obsession, while McCord slides to a stop on the shoulder. Triumphant, McCord drives past the diner and waves to Maggie on his way out of Clarksberg.

== Cast ==
- Martin Sheen as Michael McCord
- Vic Morrow as Sheriff Roy Childress
- Michelle Philips as Maggie
- Stuart Margolin as Deputy
- Nick Nolte as Buzz Stafford
- Janit Baldwin as Sissy
- Gary Morgan as Lyle Stafford
- Frederic Downs as Judge J.A. Hooker
- Don Mantooth as Jack (as Donald Mantooth)
- Joe Estevez as Don McCord (as Joseph Estevez)
- Britt Leach as Johnny
- Norman Bartold as Howard
- Barbara Collentine as Edith
- Michael Richardson as Charley
- Gavan O'Herlihy as Tom
- Jack McCulloch as Pete
- Ken Johnson as Harlie
- Sandy Brown Wyeth as Leona
- Tren Dolan as Stranger
- Monika Henreid as Gerry

== Production ==
According to producer Howie Horwitz, two shots in the film required stunt drivers to remain in cars as they drove off roads and downslope. Cinematographer Terry Meade said that one of the shots was planned with a cameramen below the road, and that Meade swapped him out for a remotely controlled camera which was destroyed by the stunt car.

== See also ==
- List of American films of 1974
