= Gary Morgan (actor) =

American actor (born 1950)

- Born: Gary Panansky; January 2, 1950 (age 76)
- Occupations: Actor; Stuntman
- Years active: 1958–present
- Children: Bonnie Morgan

Gary Morgan (born January 2, 1950) is an American actor and stunt man.

== Early life ==
Morgan was born Gary Panansky to vaudevillian parents, who adopted the professional surname Morgan. As a child, he acted in his parents' acts on Broadway and was an acrobat as well.

== Career ==
He had roles on television series, including Naked City, The Partridge Family, Adam-12, and Happy Days, as well in several TV movies, including The California Kid (1974) and Pinocchio (1976) starring Sandy Duncan. He also appeared as the son in the original pilot for Head of the Family (an unsold show that was ultimately reworked to become The Dick Van Dyke Show). Feature films include The Night God Screamed (1971), Fuzz (1972), Summer School Teachers (1974), Logan's Run (1976), Pete's Dragon (1977), Matilda (1978, title role), The North Avenue Irregulars (1979), The Final Countdown (1980), The Devil and Max Devlin (1981) and Outrageous Fortune (1987). He has done extensive stunt work, including appearances in Cujo (1983), Batman Forever (1995) and The Muppets (2011).

Due to his height (5' 5"), he changed to general stunt work.

== Personal life ==
His daughter is contortionist Bonnie Morgan.
