= The California Kid (custom car) =

The California Kid is a customized 1934 Ford three-window coupé built by Pete Chapouris.

The '34 was on the cover of Custom Rod in November 1973, along with a similar coupé built by Jim Jacobs. (Note: The coincidence would lead them to form a partnership—Pete and Jake's Hot Rod Shop in Temple City, California—in 1974.) It attracted the attention of television producer Howie Horowitz, (Note: Producer of Batman) who wanted it for a TV movie, The California Kid.

Chapouris's selection of a classic customizing technique, contrary to the trend at the time, made it perfect for its role in the movie.

The movie made Chapouris's '34 famous, and led to numerous copies being built in the following decades. Today, The California Kid refers more to the car than the film among rodders and customizers.

== Construction ==
Chapouris, then a member of the Vintage Tin Hot Rod Club, customized a 1934 Ford three-window coupe in a style that, at the time, was at odds with most contemporary enthusiast thinking, and was generally considered "old-fashioned"; "resto-rodding" (a style sympathetic to the car's original design and specification) was in vogue.

The original '34 was completed in black, with a classic style of flame job, and 1960s-era Halibrand wheels. The film company added dummy sidepipes, a 'c' channel rear bumper, and replaced the Halibrands with period-correct steel wheels and Ford hubcaps.
