= Pro Street =

Style of street-legal custom car

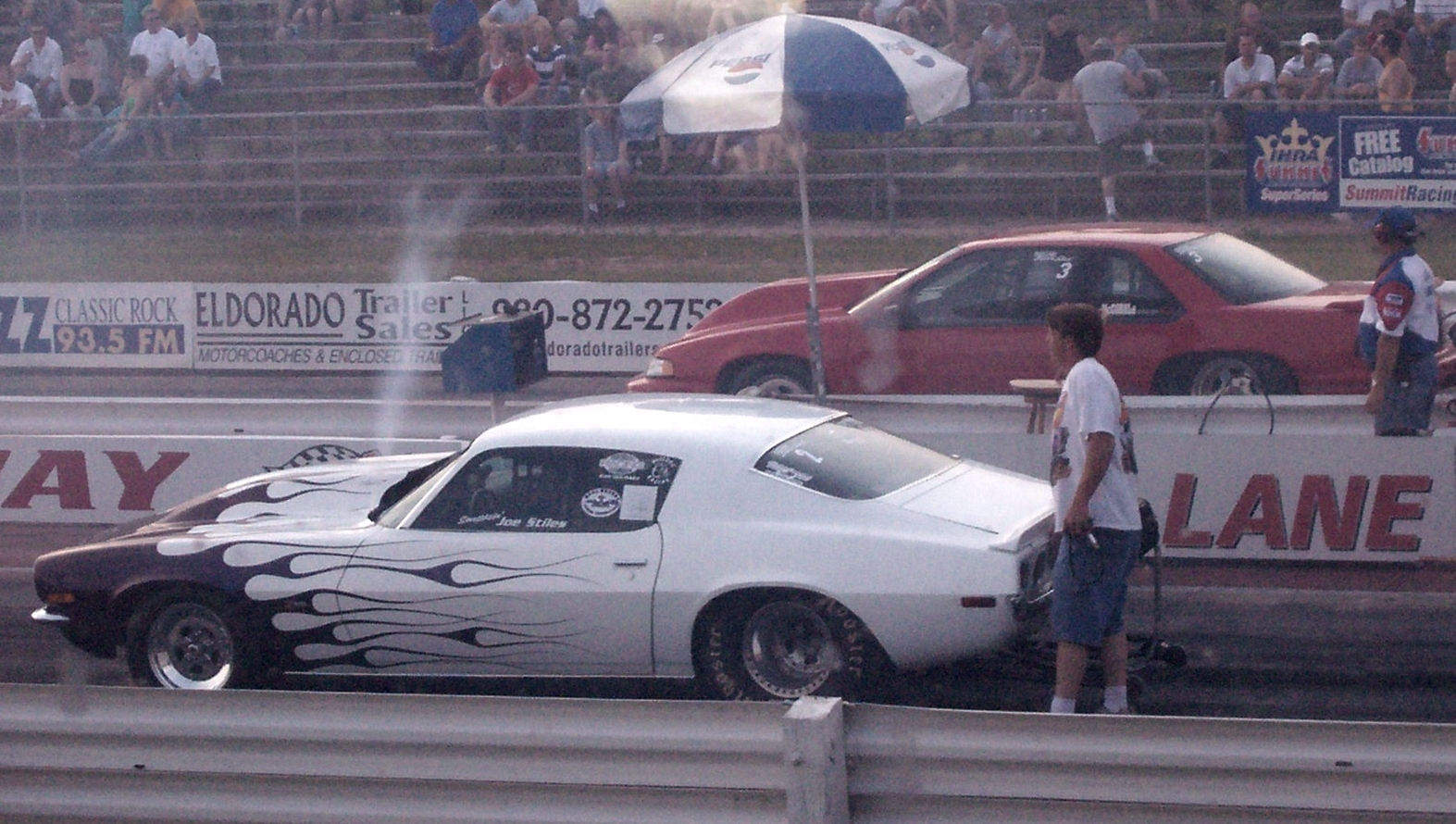
Pro Street '72 Camaro on the dragstrip

Pro Street, also known as a back half or tubbed car, is a style of street-legal custom car popular in the 1980s, usually built to imitate a pro stock class race car. Pro Street cars are close in appearance to cars used in drag racing while remaining street-legal and with a full interior.

Cars of this type typically feature two of the following three modifications:

- A highly modified V8.
- A narrowed rear axle coupled with oversized rear wheels & at least 14-by-5-inch (36 cm × 13 cm) sidewalls (located within the wheel wells) for maximum grip and wheelie bars.
- A roll cage.

Aside from the rear suspension and wheel wells, cars of this type often remain unmodified past the firewall, keeping stock floorpans, a full interior with windshield wipers, carpet, and working lights.

== See also ==
- Hot rod
