= Heatwave! =

- Genre: Drama
- Teleplay by: Peter Allan Fields; Mark Weingart
- Story by: Herbert F. Solow
- Directed by: Jerry Jameson
- Theme music composer: Fred Steiner
- Country of origin: United States
- Original language: English

Production
- Executive producer: Harve Bennett
- Producer: Herbert F. Solow
- Production locations: Long Beach, California; Saugus, California
- Cinematography: Enzo A. Martinelli
- Editors: J. Terry Williams; Doug Young
- Running time: 90 mins
- Production company: Universal Television

Original release
- Network: ABC
- Release: January 26, 1974

Heatwave! is an American disaster movie that was broadcast on the ABC television network on January 26, 1974. It was an ABC Movie of the Week. Its running time was 90 minutes. The film was directed by Jerry Jameson, produced by Herbert F. Solow and Harve Bennett. Ben Murphy, Bonnie Bedelia, Lew Ayres, and David Huddleston starred in the made-for-TV move. John Anderson, Dana Elcar, Robert Hogan, Janit Baldwin, Lionel Johnston, and Clete Roberts had supporting roles.

The plot focuses upon the effect an intense and prolonged heat wave and water shortage has on Frank Taylor and his pregnant wife Laura Taylor, both while they are in the city where they live and after they decide to relocate.

== Plot ==
When the heat wave eventually causes a total blackout that shuts down the brokerage firm where Frank works, he and Laura decide to relocate to a mountain cabin in a remote small town—which is also affected by the heat, blackout, and water shortage.

On the way to the cabin, the Taylors' car is taken from them; and they are forced to walk eight miles to the town. When the Taylors reach the town, they go to see Dr. Grayson, who appears to be Laura's old family physician. Dr. Grayson advises Laura that it is important for her to rest given the stress she has been under in the hot, dry conditions.

After Laura has seen the doctor, the Taylors go to the cabin and find two young hikers have taken shelter there. After being briefly angry, the Taylors decide to allow the hikers to stay.

Laura rests in the cabin. However, she still gives birth prematurely.

After the baby is born, Dr. Grayson states the baby cannot survive without being in an incubator, particularly because of the extreme conditions. Dr. Grayson also states that he not only has no incubator but that he would be unable to run one as he has no fuel for his generator. (He is out, and the pumps fuel stations use are powered by electricity). However, with the assistance of the hikers and two town residents, Frank is able to build and power a makeshift incubator.

When the baby has been placed in the incubator, the characters hear that it is raining, which—in the movie—indicates the heat wave has broken and the water shortage will end.

== Cast ==
- Ben Murphy as Frank Taylor
- Bonnie Bedelia as Laura Taylor
- Lew Ayres as Dr. Grayson
- David Huddleston as Arnold Brady
- John Anderson as Toler
- Dana Elcar as Prescott
- Robert Hogan as Harry Powers
- Janit Baldwin as Susan
- Lionel Johnston as Terry Roberts
- Clete Roberts as Newscaster
- Joe Perry as Counterman
- Naomi Stevens as Lady in Laundromat
- Don Mantooth as Ambulance Attendant
- Robert DoQui as Official
- Richard Bull as Health Department Official
- Stuart Nisbet as Doctor
- Christine Bennett as Secretary

== Production ==
Due to the complete lack of budget, a lot of things happen off screen. There are mentions of forest fires and constant references to brown outs’’.

== Alternative titles ==
This movie is also known by other titles outside the United States; they include the European English name of Heatwave and the French name of 120 degrés Fahrenheit.

== Reception ==
A retrospective review finds that the film is "really more a drama than a disaster movie". Various reviewers express the lack of interest or empathy provoked by the main character: "Heatwave! suffers from an unlikable and ineffective main character in Frank, who by the time he inexplicably shrugs all that off to construct an advanced medical device from a fish tank, fan, mini-fridge and cloth, has completely lost the audience." They also insist on the cinematographic challenge of visually showing a heatwave on screen, and failure of the film to do so: "The biggest hole of all, though, I have to say, is the premise itself. Unlike, say, earthquakes, fires, hurricanes, tornadoes, volcanoes, or tsunamis, there is no visual component to a heat wave."
