= Monkeemobile =

Car built for the TV show 'The Monkees'

- The Monkees vehicle
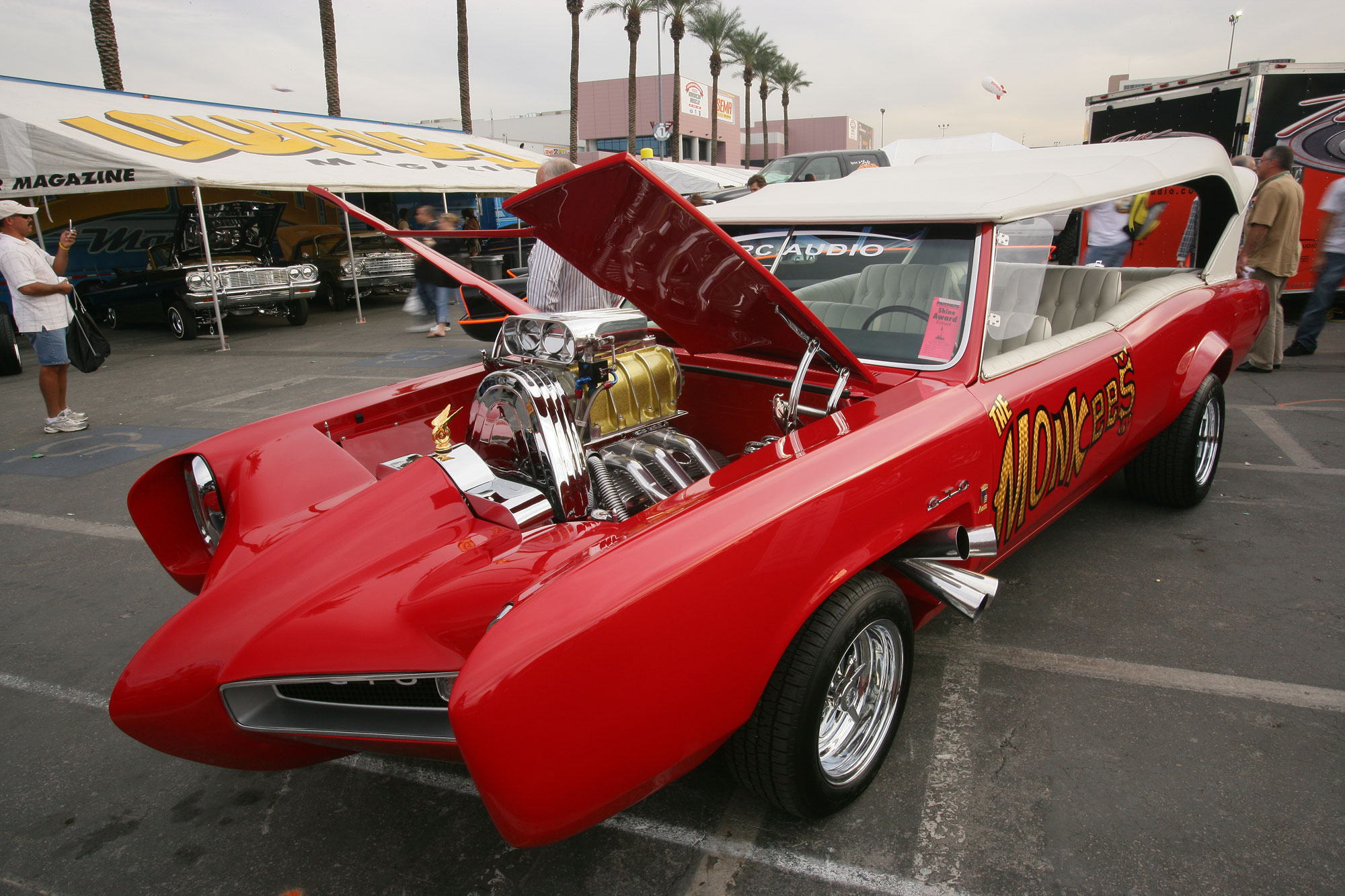
- The Monkeemobile
- First appearance: "Royal Flush"; The Monkees; 1966
- Last appearance: "The Frodis Caper"; The Monkees; 1968
- Created by: Dean Jeffries

Information
- Affiliation: The Monkees

General characteristics
- Type: Automobile
- Power: Gasoline

The Monkeemobile is a modified Pontiac GTO that was designed and built by designer Dean Jeffries for The Monkees, a pop and rock musical band and television program. The car features a split two-piece windshield, a touring car convertible top, modified rear quarter panels and front fenders, exaggerated tail lamps, set of four bucket seats and an extra third row bench where there was originally a trunk, a rear-mounted parachute and a GTO emblem on the front grille.

== Origin ==
The Monkeemobile had its origins in 1966 when Dean Jeffries was asked to design and build a car for a new TV show called The Monkees. Jeffries, under contract with Model Products Corporation (MPC) at the time, told CEO George Toteff about the project. A make of vehicle had not yet been chosen for the project. Toteff then told his friend Jim Wangers of these developments. Wangers was working with Pontiac promotion and advertising at the time and saw the show as a huge promotional opportunity for Pontiac. After making the deal, Jim Wangers supplied two base 389 4-barrel 1966 GTO convertibles with automatic transmissions to be converted into Monkeemobiles. MPC was in turn given exclusive rights to market a model kit of the Monkeemobile. They eventually sold over seven million copies of the kits.

== The car ==
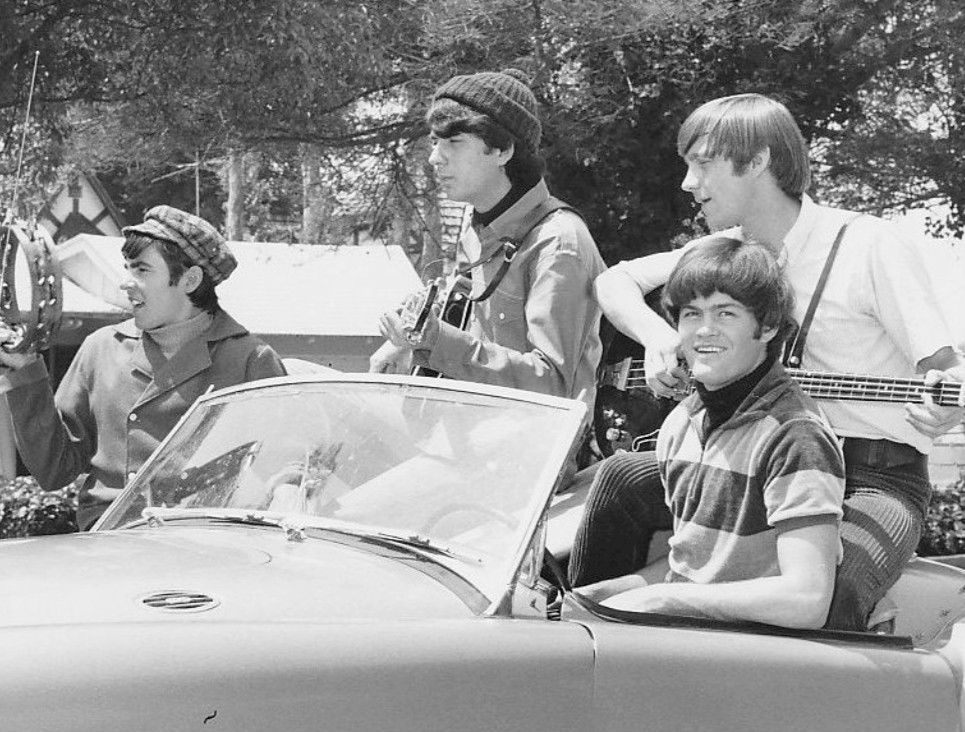
The Monkees in 1966 pictured in an MGA

Two cars were contracted, one for the television program and the other as a promotional car, for touring car shows around the United States. Both cars were built in the span of four weeks. The first version originally featured a 6-71 supercharger on the engine, a solid mounted rear axle (no springs) and extra rear end weight. This was to enable the car to "pop wheelies". Because the car had too much power and was difficult to drive, the original blower set up was removed and a dummy blower was fitted, over a stock Pontiac Tri-Power. The second car was used as a touring car for auto shows and promotional events. Before its transformation into a Monkeemobile, the second car was first seen on TV as Major Nelson's GTO in I Dream of Jeannie. Both were used on The Monkees TV series, one during the first season and both throughout the second season.

Several notable differences between the two cars exist, such as the size of the door logo and the styling of the fan belt cover and blower lines, which can be used to tell the difference between the two cars.

== Later years ==
After the television show ended, both cars were offered back to Dean Jeffries for $2,000 each, who had right of first refusal. He declined to purchase the cars because he felt he could build new ones cheaper.

The "TV car" (aka car # 1) followed the Monkees on tour only to be left in Australia in 1968. It later resurfaced in Puerto Rico as a hotel courtesy car. To this day, there is still no hard information on how the car made its way to Puerto Rico, and it was sold at government auction in 1992 for $5,000 when the hotel went out of business. Though basically as it was built, the car did get some restoration work done when bought, and it was used as the example for the Ertl Company 1:18 scale die-cast toy, The Monkees 1997 TV reunion show, "Hey, Hey, It's the Monkees" and the 2001 "Cars & Guitars Of Rock N Roll" display at the Petersen Automotive Museum . It is now in the hands of a private collector in Northern New Jersey.

The "show car" (aka car #2) was purchased by custom car designer, George Barris. This car would be the most visible during his ownership. Barris went on to use and display the car for promotions at many large and small events. In 2006 the car went through a major restoration. Even though it became a 100-point show car, many changes and upgrades were made. In January 2008, Barris, through Barrett-Jackson in Scottsdale, Arizona, auctioned the car for $360,000. It now resides in the hands of a private collector in southeastern Michigan.

Barris also had Dick Dean, who had helped Jeffries build the two originals, make a copy, identified by yellow trim on the headlight bezels, tan seats (instead of the original white upholstery), and other variations. This copy can be seen in the video for Sisters Of Mercy's Black Planet. A second copy or tribute car was recently built by a longtime associate of Dean Jeffries. This car contains many parts removed from the #2 car during its restoration and belongs to a private collector in Florida. Another replica was built for the Monkees 45th Anniversary Tour. The tour, which took place from May 12, 2011, to July 23, 2011, was the fourth and final reunion tour to feature band members Davy Jones, Micky Dolenz and Peter Tork together (Mike Nesmith abstaining), before Jones's death from a heart attack on February 29, 2012. There are numerous replicas created over the years with distinctive visual differences unique to each car. None of these copies were made by the original cars' creator, Dean Jeffries.

== Tribute car ==
A TV series showcased the complete build for the 45th Anniversary Tour replica car, built to the specifications for the television show. Dean Jeffries, the Monkeemobile's original designer and fabricator, provides direction and commentary for the car's refurbishment. This was among his last projects before his death. Unlike some other "copies" that lack many of the details of the original, the 1967 Pontiac GTO 4-speed "donor car" was professionally transformed to a concours grade show car with exacting detail, from the GM paint code "R" to the (non-functional) gold plated supercharger and correct Cragar wheels. The 45th Anniversary car was recently listed for sale by Ideal Classic Cars in Venice, Florida. The glovebox door has been signed by Peter Tork, Micky Dolenz, and Davy Jones.
