= T-bucket =

Hot rod, based on a Ford Model T

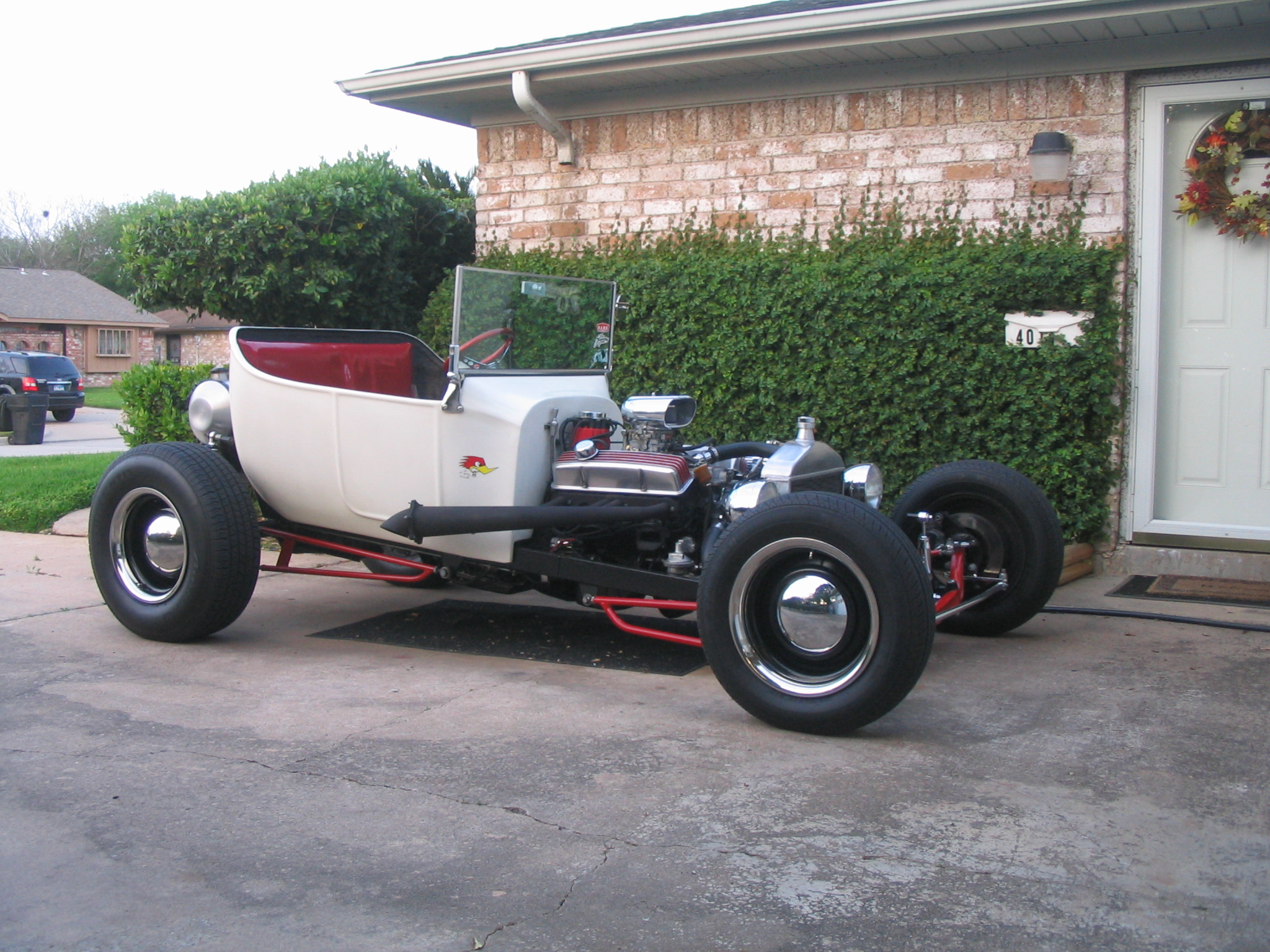
A 1923 Ford T Bucket in the traditional style. It features lake headers, dog dish hubcaps, dropped "I" beam axle, narrow rubber, and single 4-barrel, but non-traditional disc brakes.

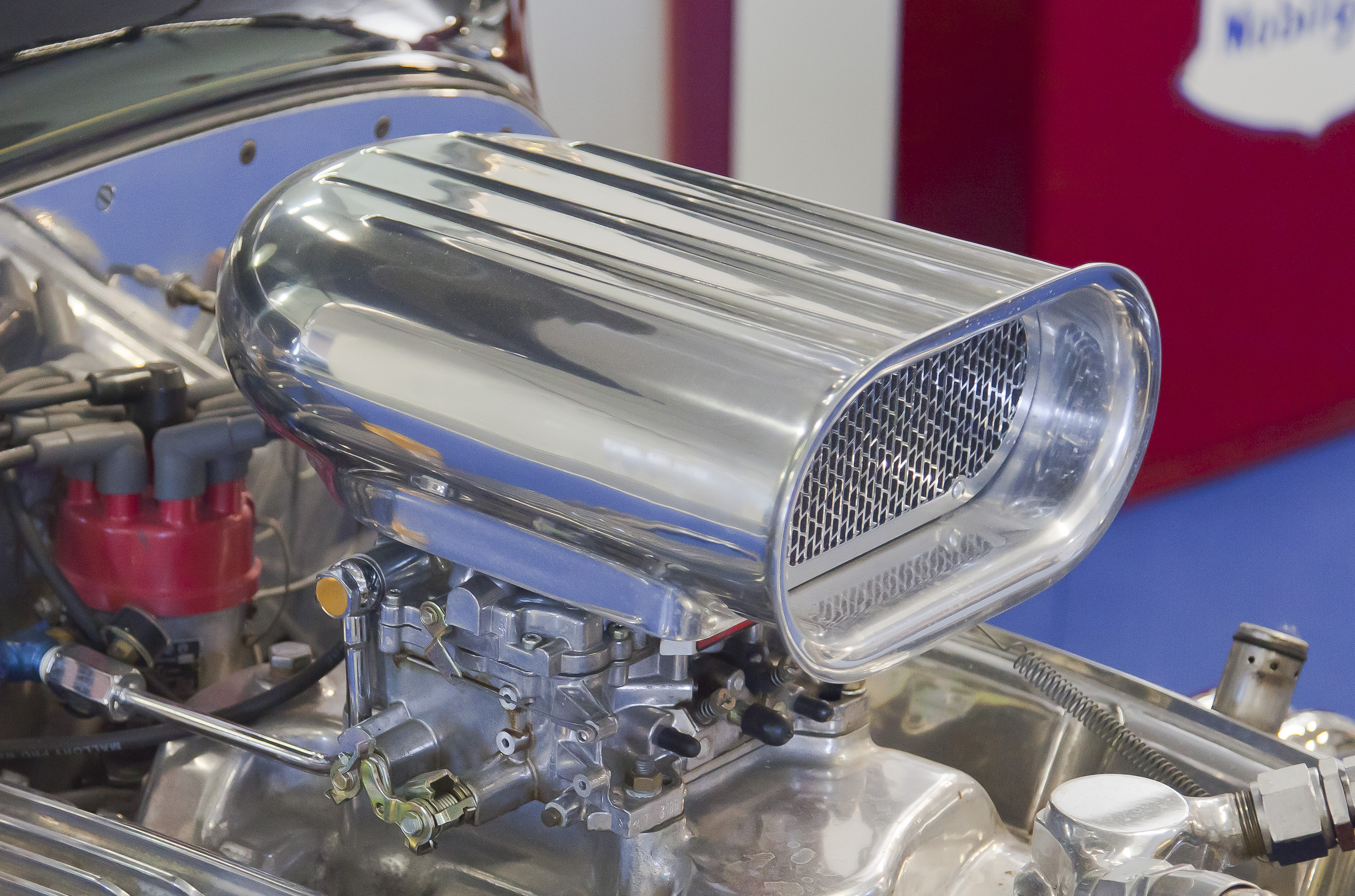
Detail view of the air inlet

A T-bucket (or Bucket T) is a hot rod, based on a Ford Model T built from 1915 to 1927, but extensively modified. T-buckets were favorites for greasers.

== History ==
Model Ts were hot-rodded and customized from the 1920s on, but the T-bucket was specifically created and named by Norm Grabowski in the 1950s. This car was named Lightning Bug, better known as the Kookie Kar, after being redesigned by Grabowski and appearing in the TV show 77 Sunset Strip, driven by character Gerald "Kookie" Kookson. The exposure it gained led to numerous copies being built.

A genuine T-bucket has the two-seater body of a Model T roadster (with or without the turtle deck or small pickup box), this "bucket"-shaped body shell giving the cars their name. A Model T-style radiator is usually fitted, and even these can sometimes be barely up to the task of cooling the large engines fitted. Windshields, when fitted, are vertical glass like the original Model T.

Today, T-buckets remain common. They generally feature an enormous engine for the size and weight of the car, generally a V8, along with tough drivetrains to handle the power and large rear tires to apply that power to the road. The front wheels are often much narrower than the rear wheels, and are often motorcycle wheels.

== Replicas ==
Since the last Model Ts were built in 1927, most modern T-buckets use replica fiberglass bodies. By the 1950s, original steel Model T bodies that had not been completely worn out were becoming increasingly hard to find and in 1957 the first fiberglass T-Bucket body (based on the 1923 version) was introduced by the short-lived Diablo Speed Shop in Northern California. Of the only two or three bodies built by Diablo, one was purchased by Southern California hot rod builder Buzz Pitzen and became the world's first fiberglass T-bucket.

== Show cars ==
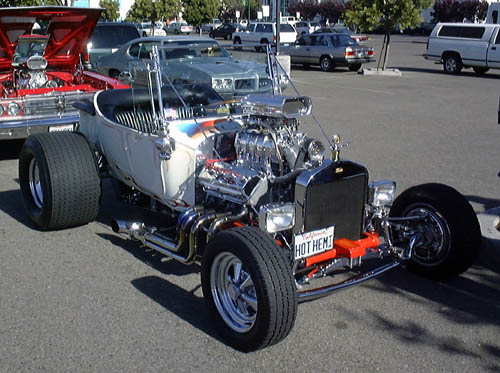
T-bucket with early Chrysler 'hemi' engine. The aluminum radiator (rather than brass), rectangular headlights, and five-spokes (rather than motorcycle wheels) mark this as a later incarnation.

Most are built purely for street or show use, and the big engines are more for show than for need — many are more powerful than the vehicles can use. Although the body shell is original in appearance, engines of a wide variety of makes are commonly used. The small-block Chevrolet is a common choice, since it is relatively small, light, easy to obtain and to improve, and performs well. Four-cylinder engines are also common, especially if the car is used regularly. Some install superchargers on their engines, and some use modern fuel-injected engines.

== In popular culture ==
A song celebrating the car, "Bucket 'T'," was written by Don Altfeld, Jan Berry, Roger Christian and Dean Torrence and first recorded by Jan & Dean in 1964. Subsequent covers of the song were released by Ronny and the Daytonas in November 1964 and by The Who on November 11, 1966, as part of their EP Ready Steady Who.

== Gallery ==
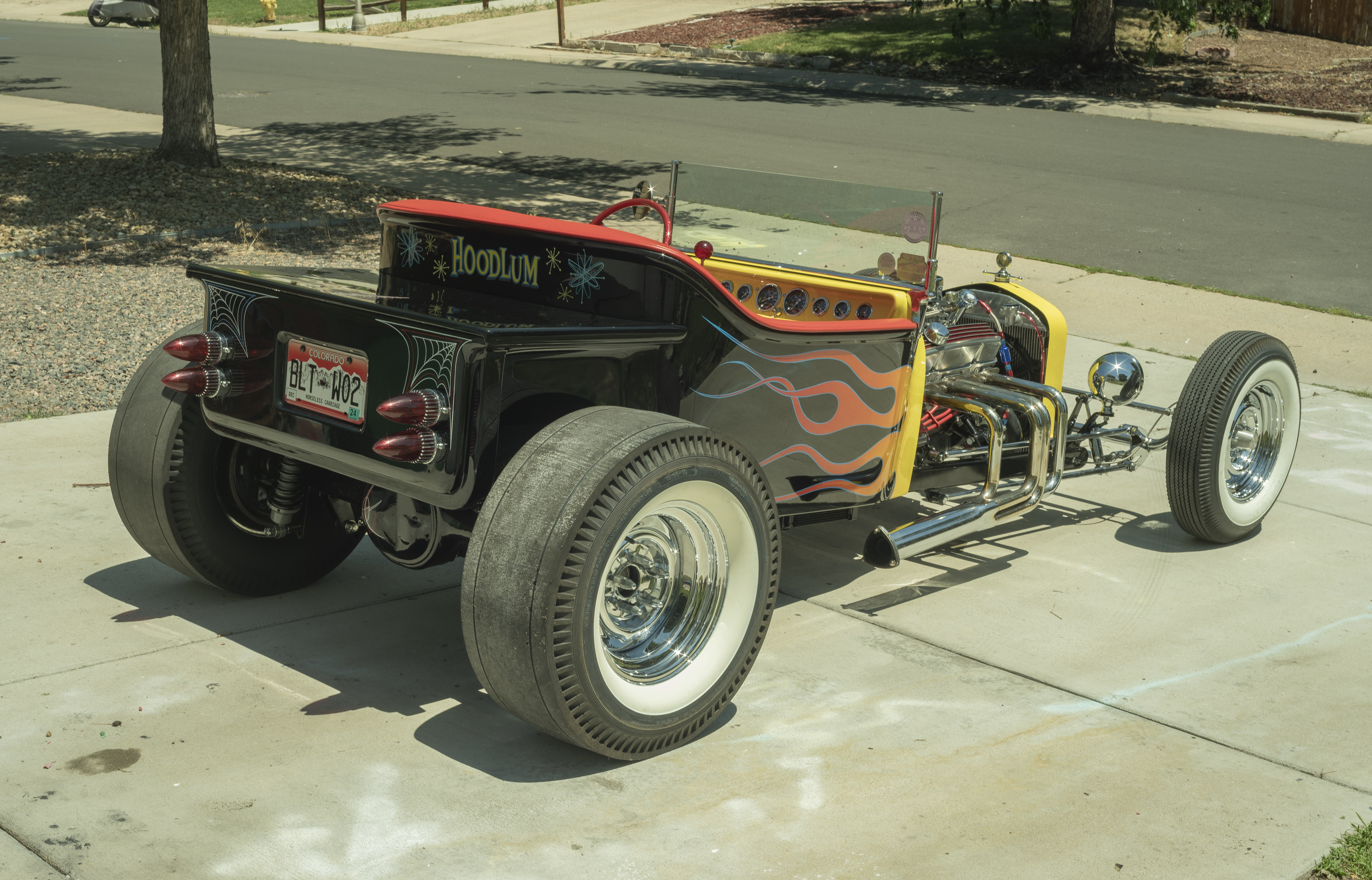
1923 early 60s style T Bucket

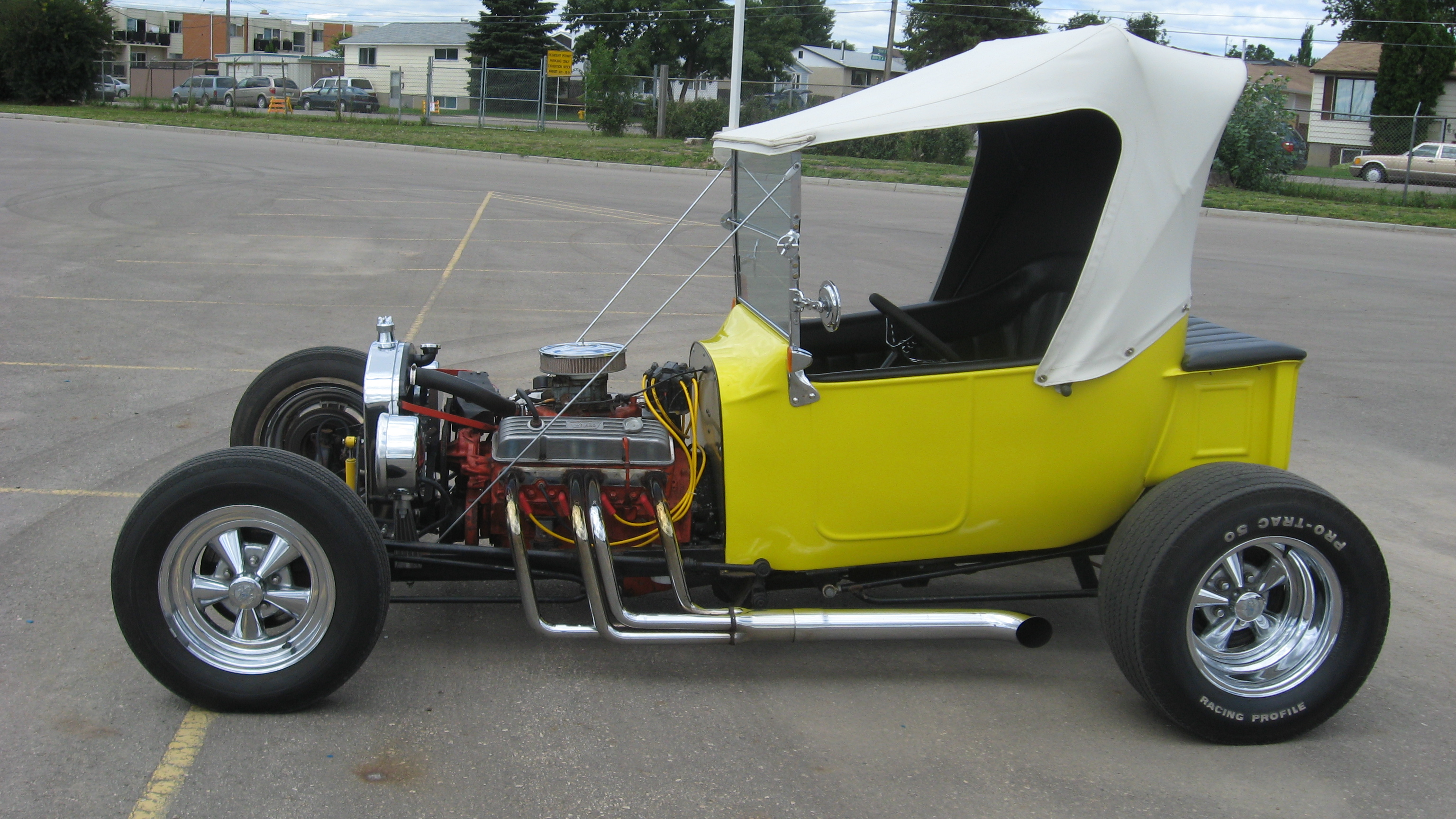
Convertible T-bucket in a hybrid style: traditional sidepipes and dropped tube axle, transverse front leaf spring, and non-traditional front disc brakes and five-spokes

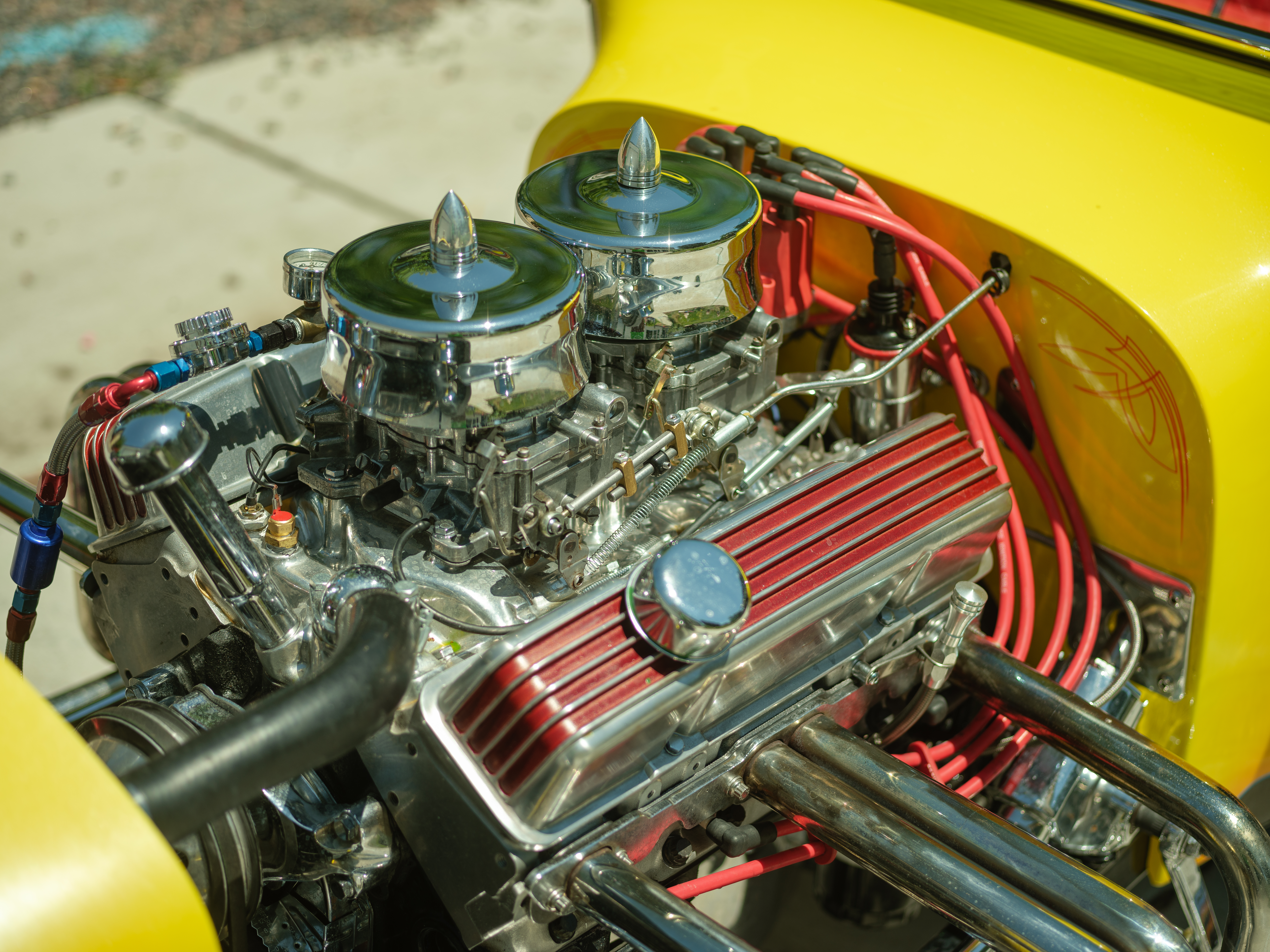
T-bucket engine, open chassis, dual four-barrel carbs and extensive chrome plating

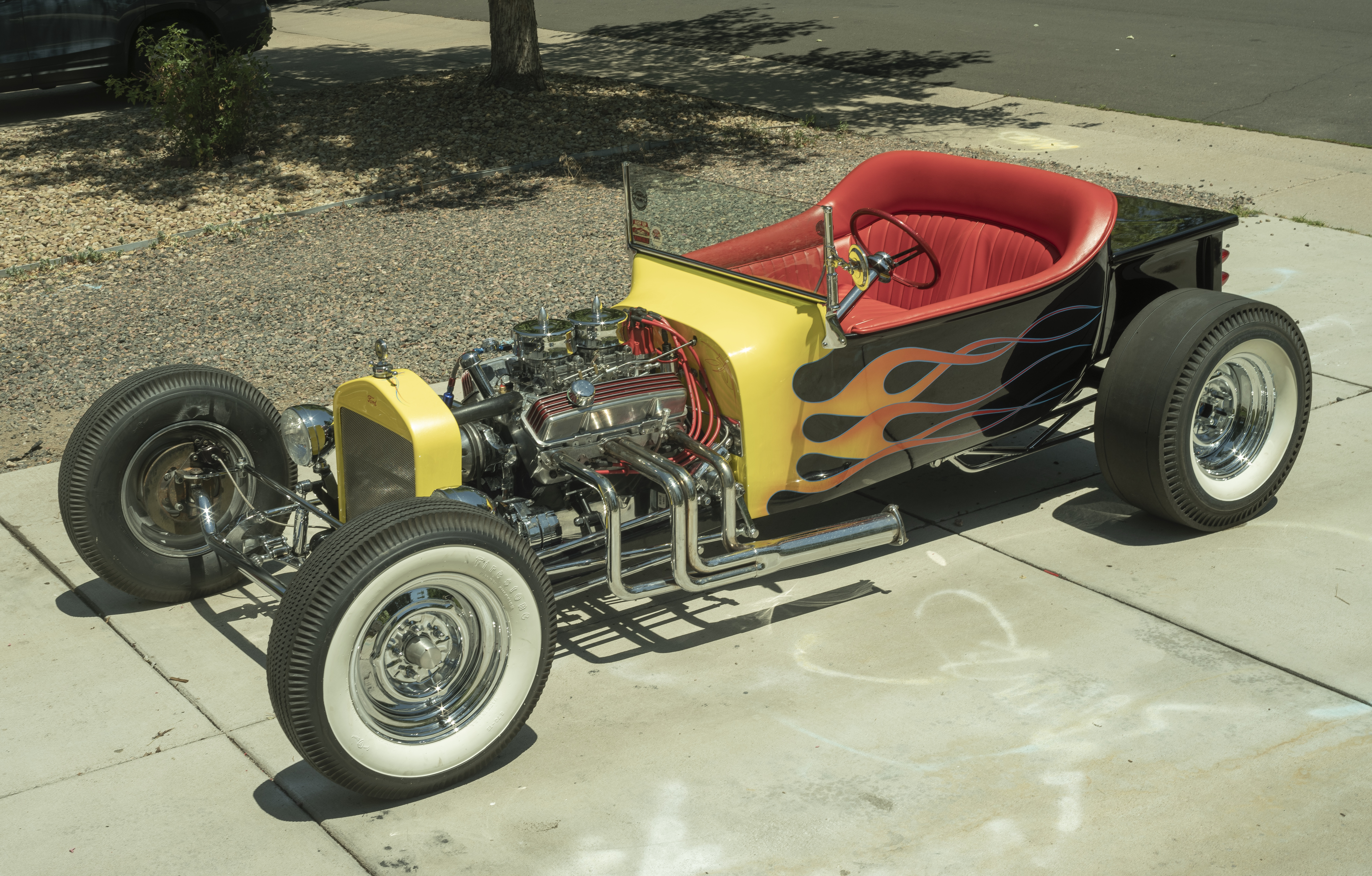
23 T-bucket with early Chevrolet small-block engine, dual four-barrel carburetors, pie-pan cheater slicks and wide white-wall tires
