= Donald Mantooth =

American actor

Don Mantooth
- Born: Donald Mantooth
- Occupation: Actor
- Years active: 1974 to 1983

Donald "Don" Mantooth is an American actor best known for his roles in films such as Earthquake, Uncommon Valor, The California Kid, and The Seekers, and TV series such as Marcus Welby, M.D., Emergency!, Columbo (“Swan Song”), and Knight Rider. He is the younger brother of Randolph Mantooth. He graduated from San Marcos High School and Santa Barbara City College in Santa Barbara, California.

== Filmography ==
- Marcus Welby, M.D. (1974, TV Series) - 1st Student
- Owen Marshall: Counselor at Law (1974, TV Series) - Ed Peters
- Heat Wave (1974, TV Movie) - Ambulance Attendant
- The Six Million Dollar Man (1974, TV Series) - 1st Radio Operator
- Columbo (1974, TV Series) - Phil
- Hec Ramsey (1974, TV Series) - John
- The California Kid (1974, TV Movie) - Jack
- Aloha Means Goodbye (1974, TV Movie) - Intern
- Lucas Tanner (1974, TV Series) - Paul Newton
- Sierra (1974, TV Series) - Scott Parker
- Earthquake (1974) - Sid
- Emergency! (1974, TV Series) - Frat Member / Paramedic 95
- Let's Switch (1975, TV Movie)
- Kolchak: The Night Stalker (1974–1975, TV Series) - Tim Brennan / Sleep Subject / Policeman
- A Cry for Help (1975, TV Movie) - Arthur Schullman
- Quincy M.E. (1976, TV Series) - Police Officer
- Battlestar Galactica (1979, TV Mini-Series) - Medtech
- The Seekers (1979, TV Series) - Plenty Coup
- Knight Rider (1982, TV Series) - Corey
- Uncommon Valor (1983) - POW #3 (final film role)
