= Hot rod =

American car with a large engine modified for linear speed

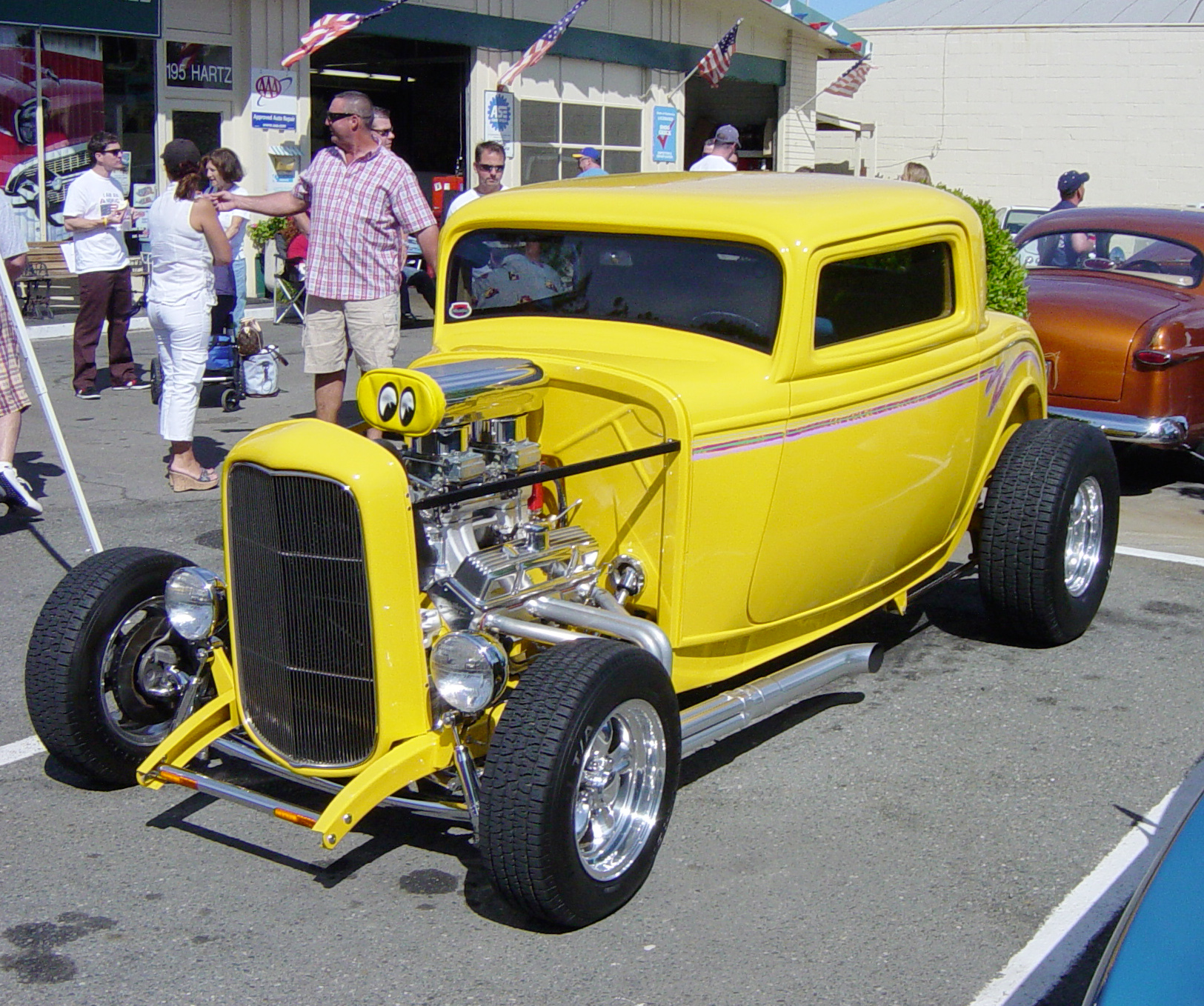
3-window highboy Deuce coupé with a traditional chop—dropped front axle, sidepipes, bugcatcher scoop (with Mooneyes cover) over dual quads on a tunnel ram—as well as less-traditional shaved door handles and disc brakes

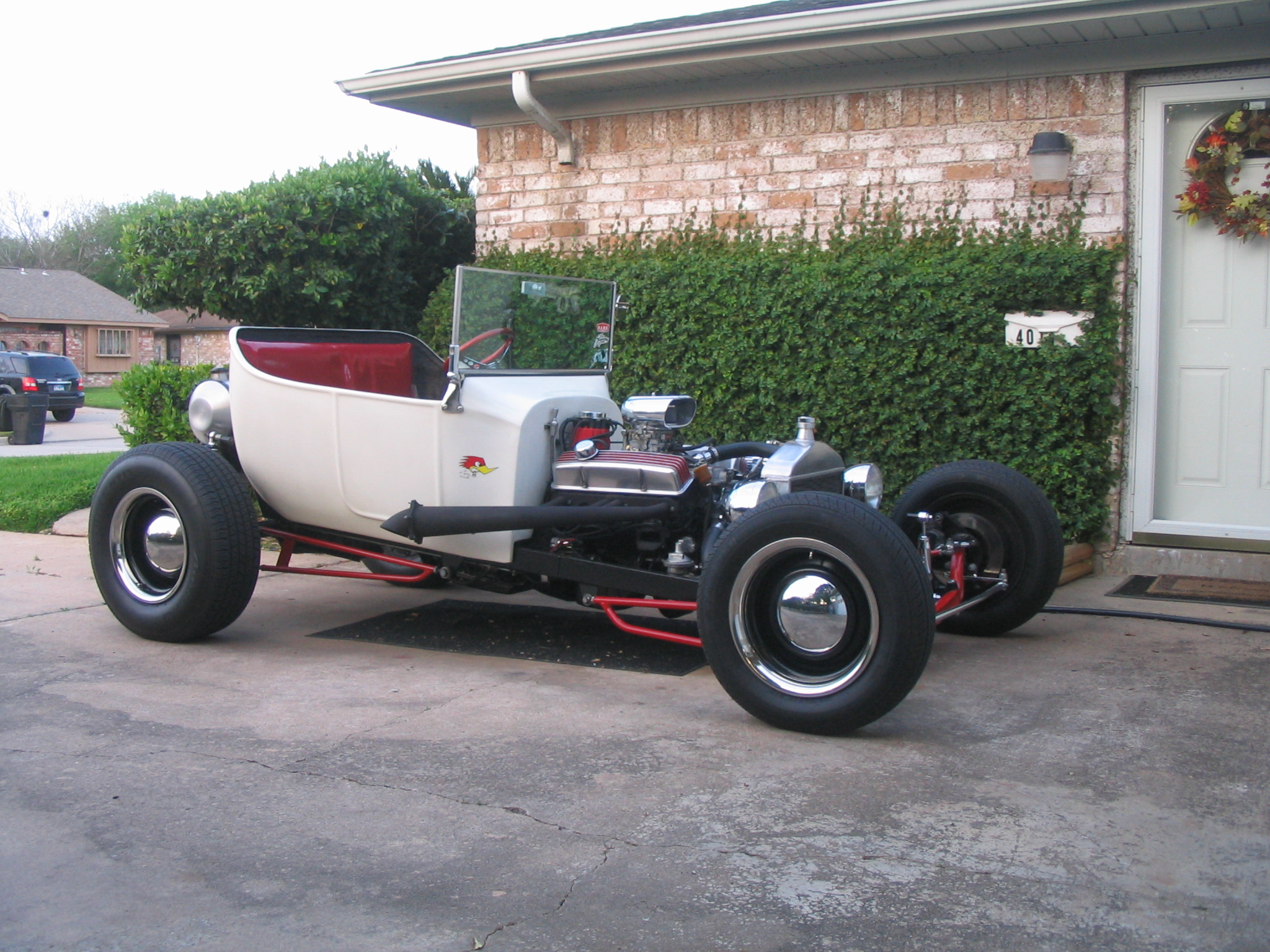
A 1923 Ford T-bucket in the traditional style with lake headers, dog dish hubcaps, dropped "I" beam axle, narrow rubber, and single 4-barrel, but non-traditional disc brakes

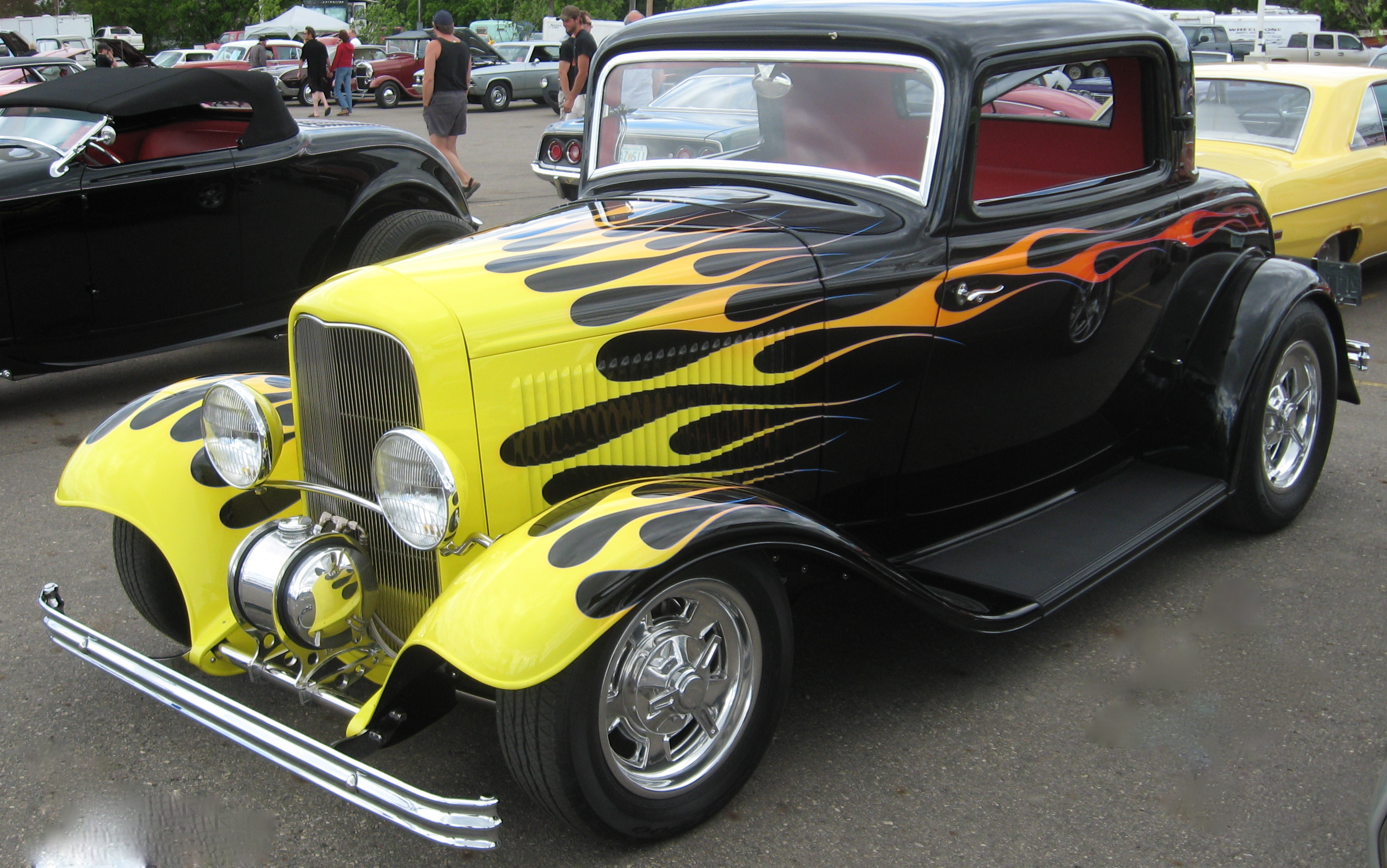
1932 3-window with a classic-style flame job and Moon tank, reminiscent of Chapouris' California Kid

Hot rods are typically American automobiles that have been rebuilt or modified with larger or more powerful engines optimized for speed and acceleration. One commonly cited description defines a hot rod as "a car that's been stripped down, souped up, and made to go much faster."

Beyond mechanical modification, hot rodding developed as a distinctive cultural movement emphasizing hands-on craftsmanship, individual expression, and community. Originating in the United States during the mid-20th century, it became closely associated with youth culture, street racing, and subcultures such as the greasers, and later influenced music, film, and visual design.

There is no single, universally accepted definition of what constitutes a hot rod, and the term has been applied to a wide range of vehicles and styles. Most hot rods are individually designed and constructed using components from multiple sources, and while some are built for competition, many are intended primarily for exhibition or street use.

== Etymology ==
There are various theories about the origin of the term "hot rod". The common theme is that "hot" related to "hotting up" a car, which means modifying it for greater performance. With regards to the word "rod", one theory is that it means roadster, a lightweight 2-door car which was often used as the basis for early hot rods. Another theory is that "rod" refers to camshaft, a part of the engine which was often upgraded in order to increase power output.

In the early days, a car modified for increased performance was called a "gow job". This term morphed into the hot rod in the early to late 1940s.

The term "hot rod" has had various uses in relation to performance cars. For example, the Ontario Ministry of the Environment in its vehicle emissions regulations refers to a hot rod as any motorized vehicle that has a replacement engine differing from the factory original.

== History ==
=== 1920s to 1945 ===
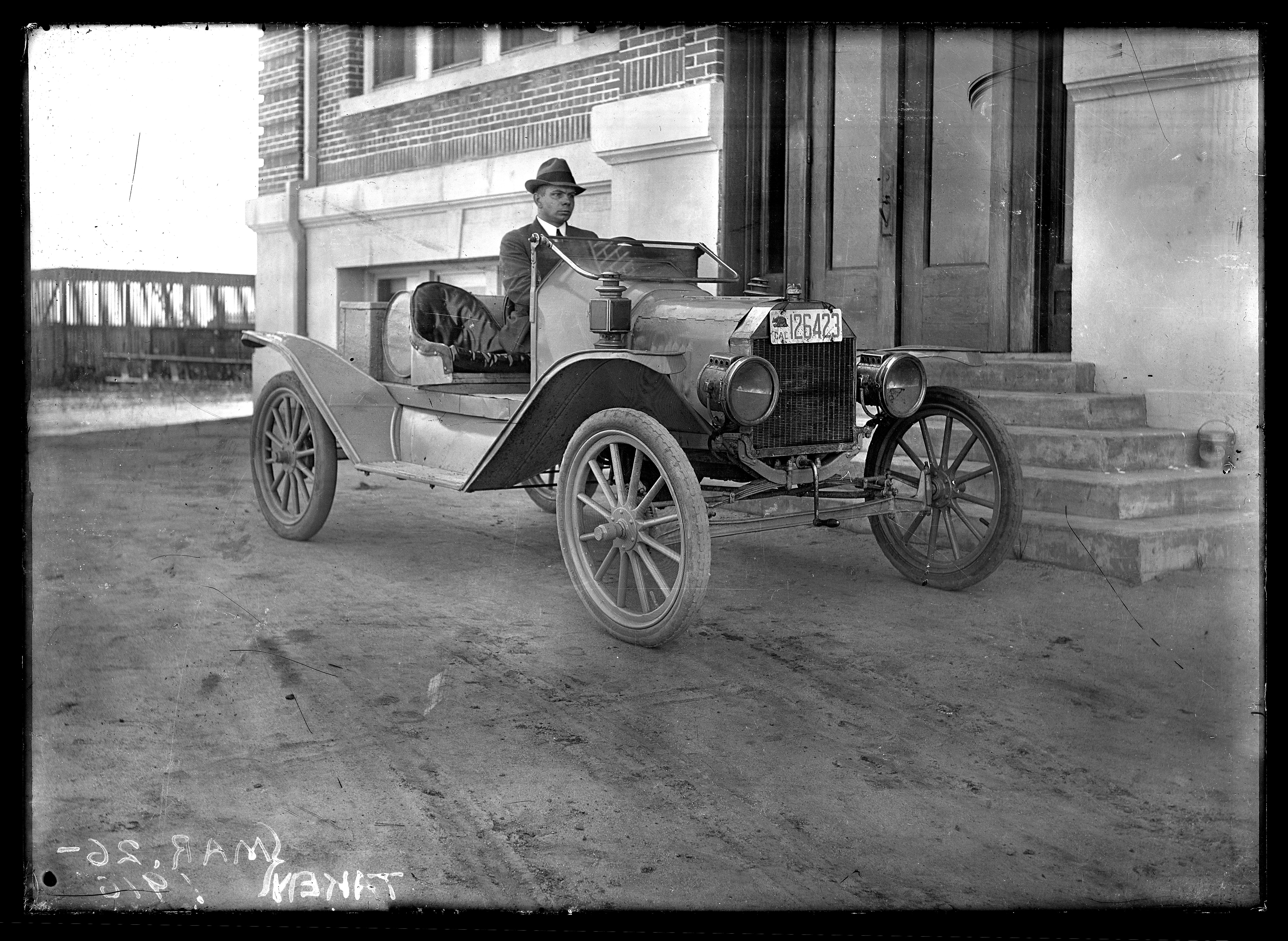
A picture from 1916 of a Ford Model T converted into a speedster.

Early speedsters, dating back to the 1910s and 1920s, are considered to be one of the ancestors of the hot rod movement. These were racecars, often based on Ford Model Ts, and modified with custom bodies. Another forerunner to the hotrod were the modified cars used in the Prohibition era by bootleggers to evade revenue agents and other law enforcement.

Hot rods first appeared in the late 1930s in southern California, where people raced modified cars on dry lake beds northeast of Los Angeles, under the rules of the Southern California Timing Association, among other groups. This gained popularity after World War II, particularly in California, because many returning soldiers had received technical training. The first hot rods were old cars (most often Fords, typically 1910s–1920s Model Ts, 1928–31 Model As, or 1932–34 Model Bs), modified to reduce weight. Engine swaps often involved fitting the Ford flathead V8 engine (known as the "flatty") into a different car, for example, the common practice in the 1940s of installing the "60 horse" version into a Jeep chassis.

Typical modifications were removal of convertible tops, hoods, bumpers, windshields, and/or fenders; channeling the body; and modifying the engine by tuning and/or replacing with a more powerful type. Wheels and tires were changed for improved traction and handling. Hot rods built before 1945 commonly used '35 Ford wire-spoke wheels.

=== 1945 to 1960 ===
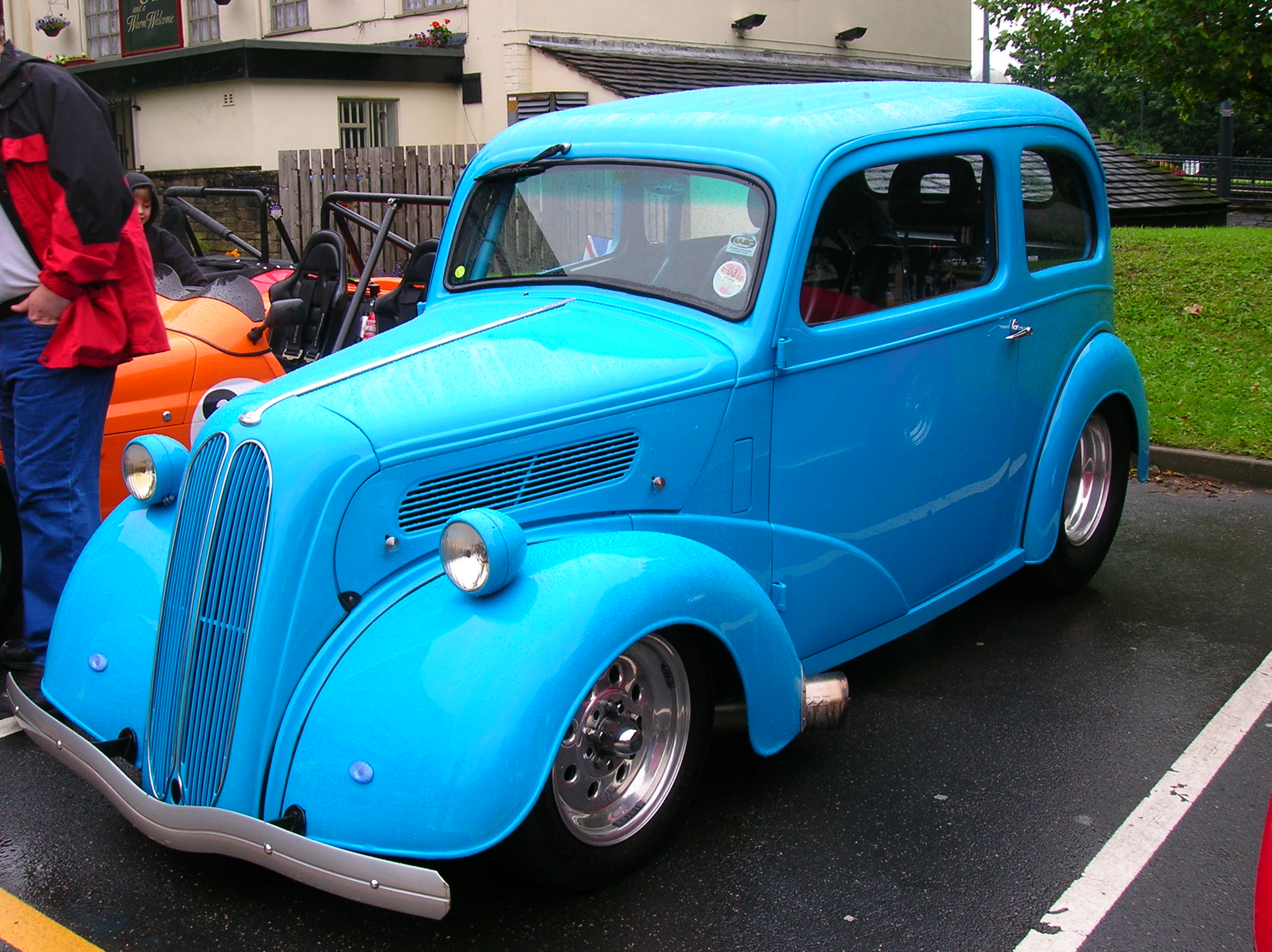
Ford Popular (also known as an Anglia) 2 door sedan.

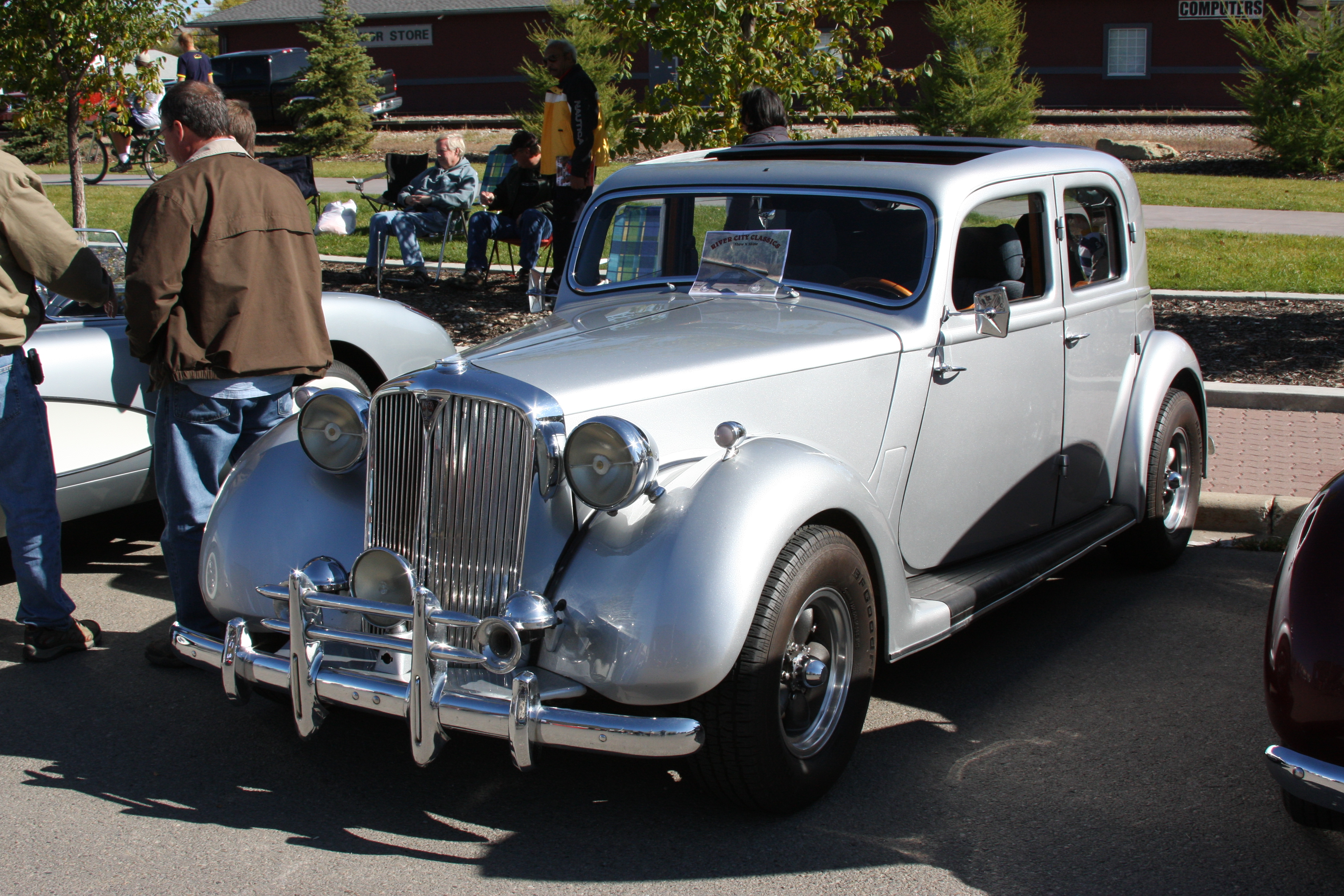
Hot-rodded prewar British Rover 10

After World War II, many small military airports throughout the country were either abandoned or rarely used, allowing hot rodders across the country to race on marked courses. Originally, drag racing had tracks as long as 1 mi (1.6 km) or more, and included up to four lanes of racing simultaneously. As some hot rodders also raced on the street, a need arose for an organization to promote safety, and to provide venues for safe racing. The National Hot Rod Association was founded in 1951, to take drag racing off the streets and into controlled environments.

In the '50s and '60s, the Ford flathead V8 was supplanted by the Chrysler FirePower engine (known as the "early hemi"). Many hot rods would upgrade the brakes from mechanical to hydraulic ("juice") and headlights from bulb to sealed-beam. A typical mid-1950s to early 1960s custom Deuce was fenderless and steeply chopped, powered by a Ford or Mercury flathead, with an Edelbrock intake manifold, Harman and Collins magneto, and Halibrand quick-change differential. Front suspension hairpins were adapted from sprint cars, such as the Kurtis Krafts.

As hot rodding became more popular, magazines and associations catering to hot rodders were started, such as the magazine Hot Rod, founded in 1948.

=== 1960 to present ===
As automobiles offered by the major automakers began increasing performance, the lure of hot rods began to wane. With the advent of the muscle car, it was now possible to purchase a high-performance car straight from the showroom.

However, the 1973 Oil Crisis caused car manufacturers to focus on fuel efficiency over performance, which led to a resurgence of interest in hot rodding. As the focus shifted away from racing, the modified cars became known as "street rods". The National Street Rod Association (NSRA) was formed and began hosting events.

By the 1970s, the 350 cu in (5.7 L) Chevrolet small-block engine was the most common choice of engine for hot rods. Another popular engine choice is the Ford Windsor engine. During the 1980s, many car manufacturers were reducing the displacements of their engines, thus making it harder for hot rod builders to obtain large displacement engines. Instead, engine builders had to modify the smaller engines (such as using non-standard crankshafts and pistons) to obtain larger displacement. While current production V8s tended to be the most frequent candidates, this also applied to others. In the mid-1980s, as stock engine sizes diminished, rodders discovered the 215 cu in (3.5 L) aluminum-block Buick or Oldsmobile V8 could be modified for substantially greater displacement, with mainly wrecking yard parts. This trend was not limited to American cars; Volkswagen enthusiasts similarly stretched stock 1.6 L (98 cu in) engines to over 2 L (120 cu in).

== In modern culture ==
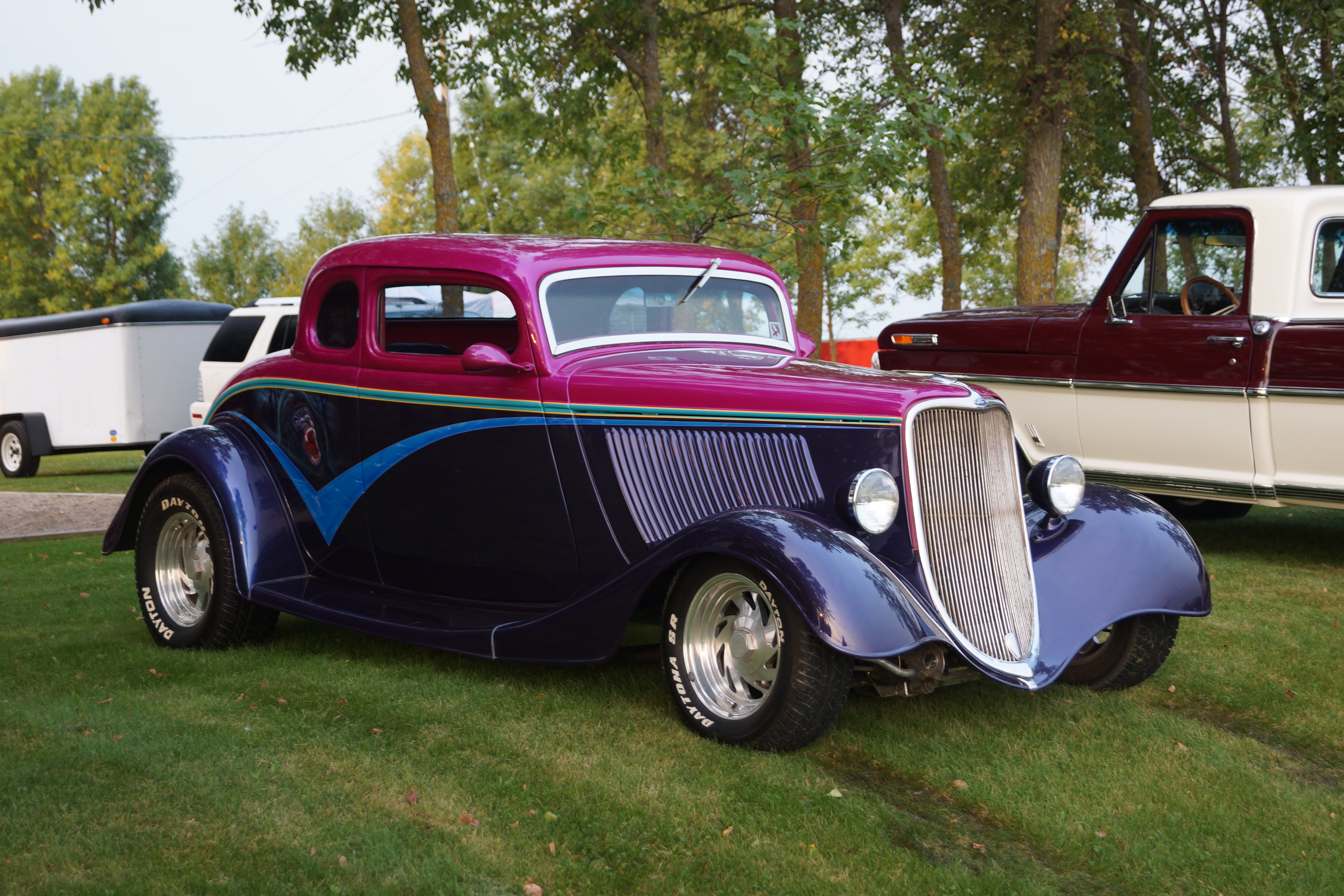
1933 Ford 5-Window Coupe, an example of what some people might consider to be a street rod

The hot rod community is often said to be divided into two main groups: street rodders and hot rodders. The definition of what counts as a "street rod" is debated, however, with definitions ranging from hot rods that feature modern features or styles, to any hot rod which is primarily built to drive on the street.

=== Lifestyle ===
There is a contemporary movement of traditional hot rod builders, car clubs and artists who have returned to the roots of hot rodding as a lifestyle. This includes a new breed of traditional hot rod builders, artists, and styles, as well as classic style car clubs. Events like GreaseOrama feature traditional hot rods and the greaser lifestyle. Magazines like Ol' Skool Rodz, Gears and Gals, and Rat-Rods and Rust Queens cover events and people.

=== In popular culture ===
There are magazines that feature traditional hot rods, including Hot Rod, Car Craft, Rod and Custom, and Popular Hot Rodding. There are also television shows such as My Classic Car, Horsepower TV, American Hot Rod, Fast and Loud, and Chop Cut Rebuild.

Particularly during the early 1960s, a genre of "hot rod music" rose to mainstream popularity. Hot rod music was largely a product of a number of surf music groups running out of ideas for new surfing songs and simultaneously shifting their lyrical focus toward hot rods. Hot rod music would prove to be the second phase in a progression known as the California Sound, which would mature into more complex topics as the decade passed. Hot rods were used as the theme of Lightning Rod, a Rocky Mountain Construction roller coaster at Dollywood.

=== In Sweden and Finland ===
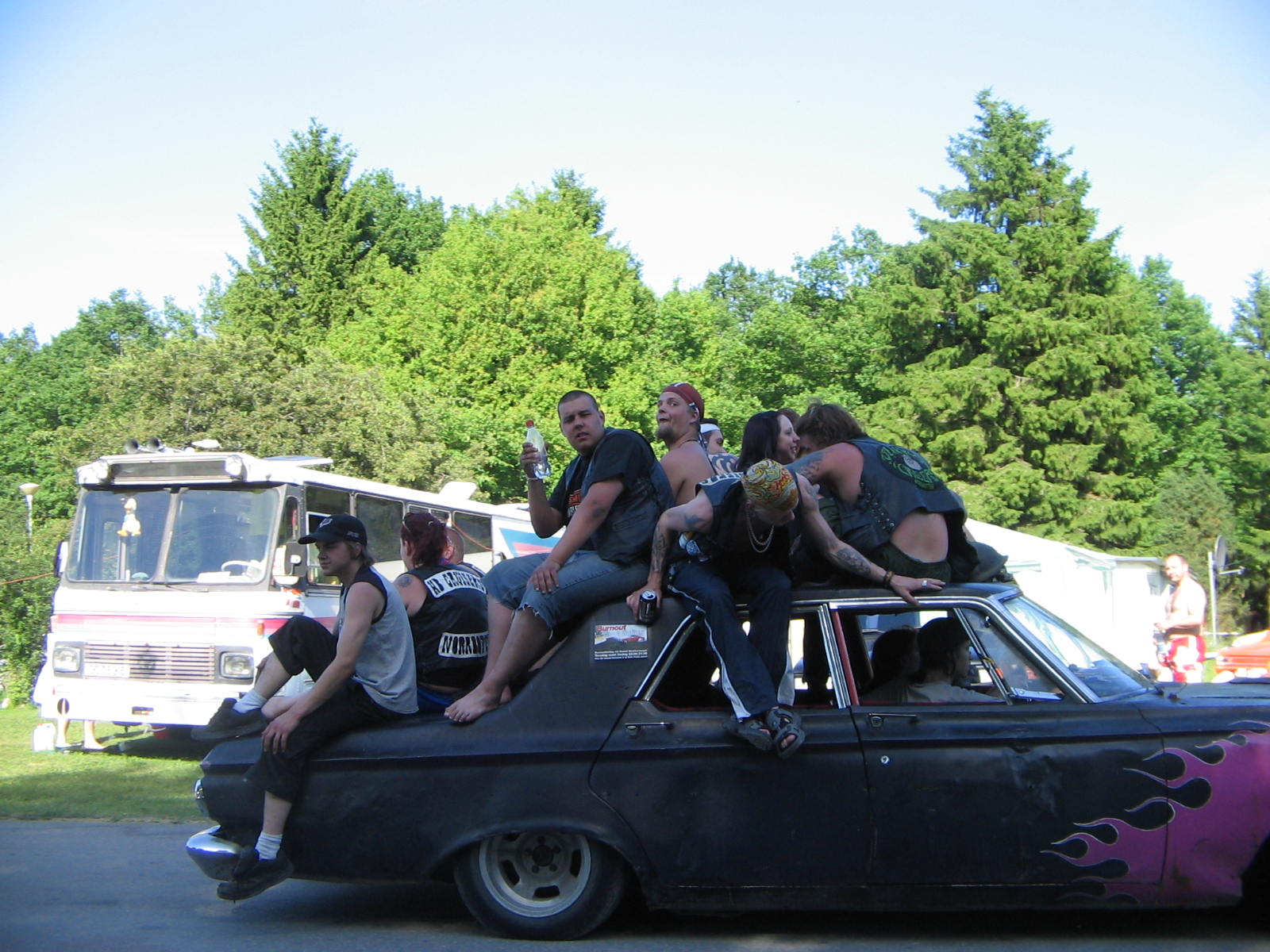
Swedish hot rodders with a 1964 American Plymouth at Power Big Meet

Locals in Sweden and Finland, influenced by American culture, have created a vibrant local hot rod culture where enthusiasts gather at meetings such as Power Big Meet in Lidköping and clubs like Wheels and Wings in Varberg, both located in Sweden. Since there is very little "vintage tin", the hot rods in Sweden are generally made with a home-made chassis (usually a Model T or A replica), with a Jaguar (or Volvo 240) rear axle, a small-block V8, and fiberglass tub, but some have been built using for instance a Volvo Duett chassis. Because Swedish regulations required a crash test even for custom-built passenger cars between 1969 and 1982, the Duett option was preferred, since it was considered a rebodied Duett rather than a new vehicle. Some 1950s and 1960s, cars are also hot rodded, like Morris Minor, Ford Anglia, Volvo Amazon, Ford Cortina, and '57 Chevy, to name but a few. These are known as custom cars (sometimes spelled Kustom).

== Gallery ==
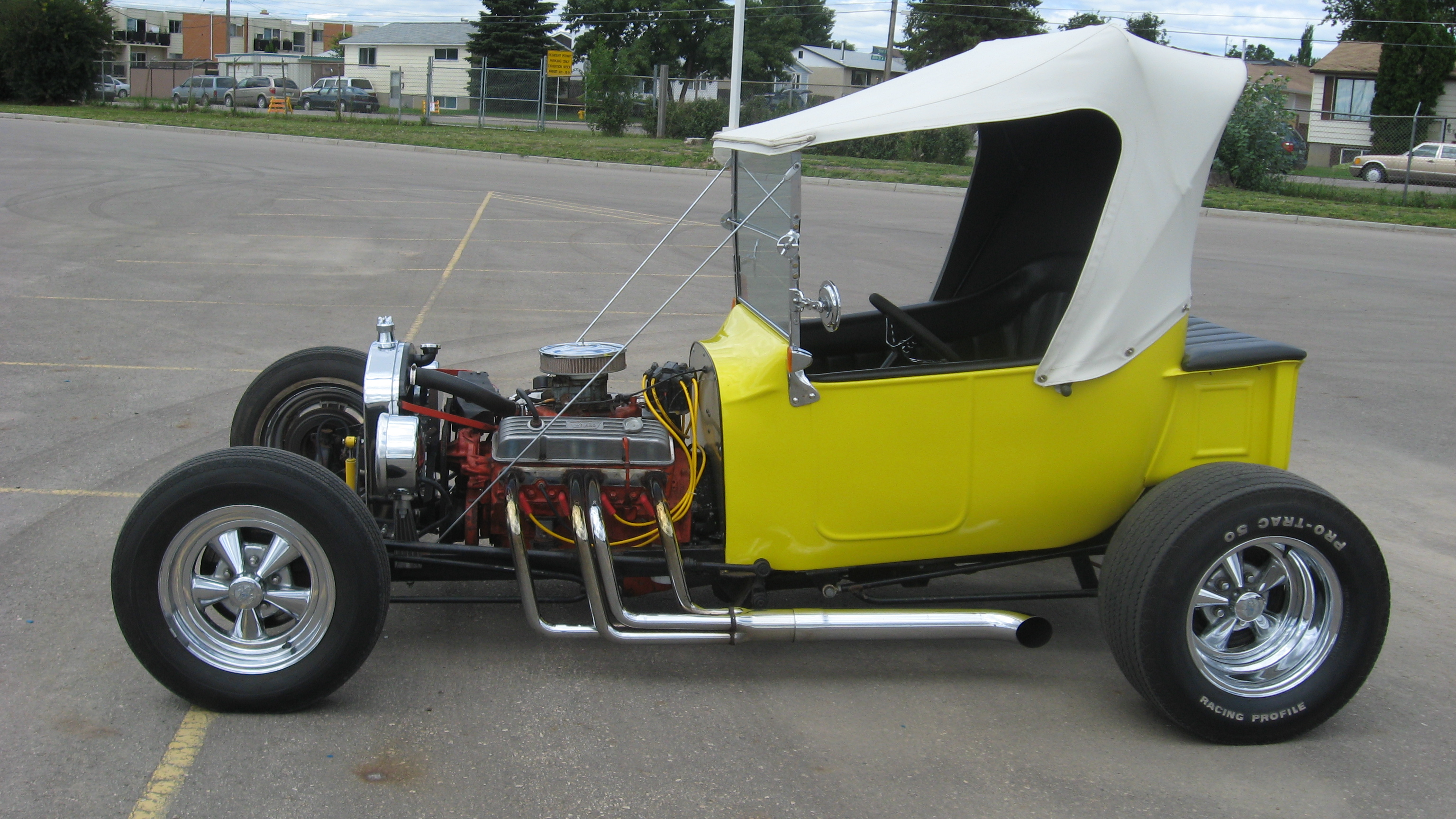
Ford T-bucket based hot rod. Also features dropped tube axle, transverse front leaf spring, and front disc brakes.

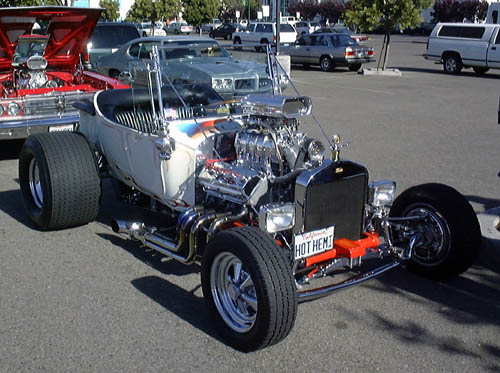
T-bucket with early hemi, but aluminum radiator (rather than brass), rectangular headlights, and five-spokes (rather than motorcycle wheels) mark this as a later incarnation

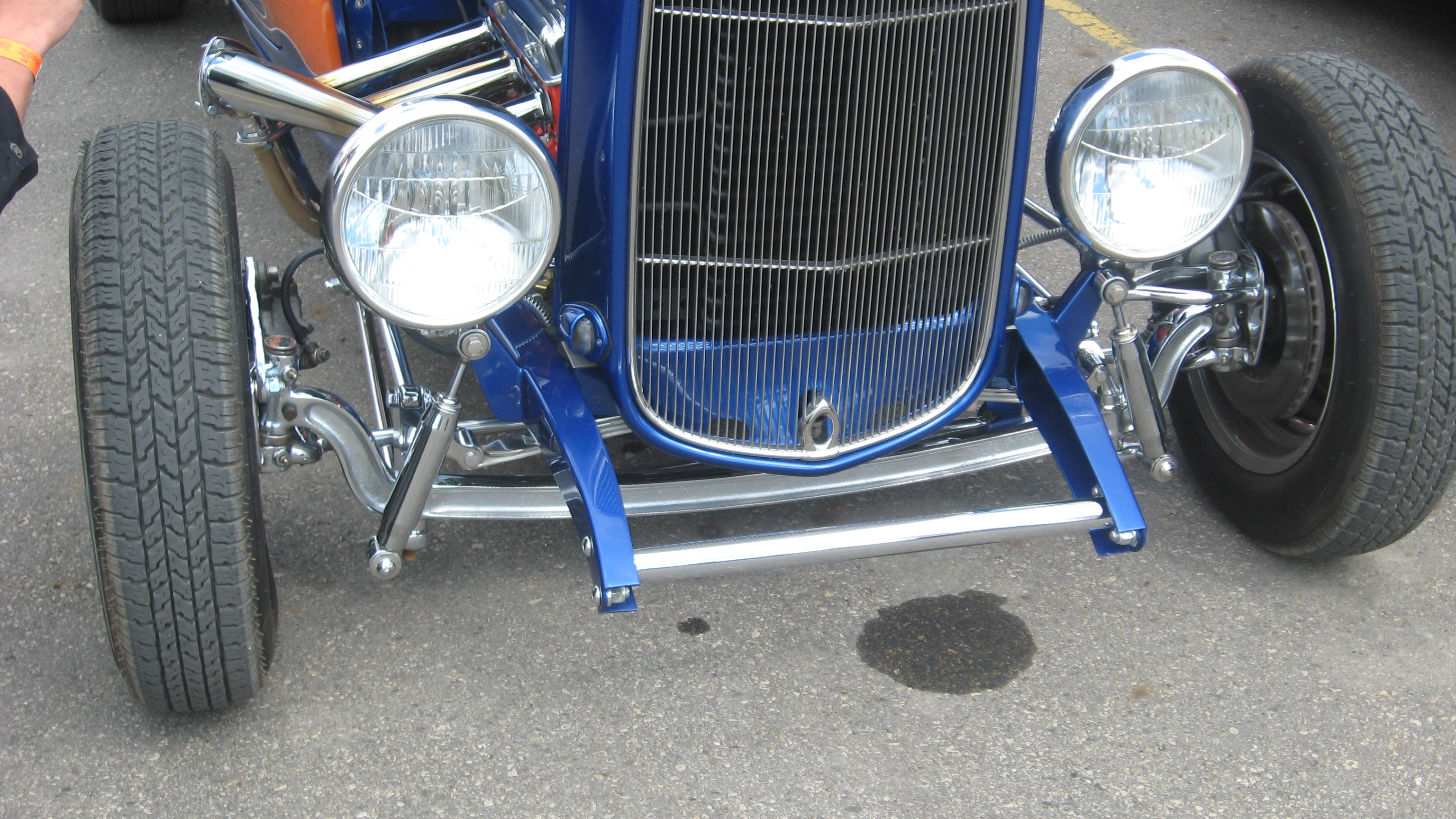
Deuce coupe featuring '32 grille shell, original headlights, chrome dropped I-beam axle and tube shocks. Note stock frame rails, disc brakes, Lakester pipes

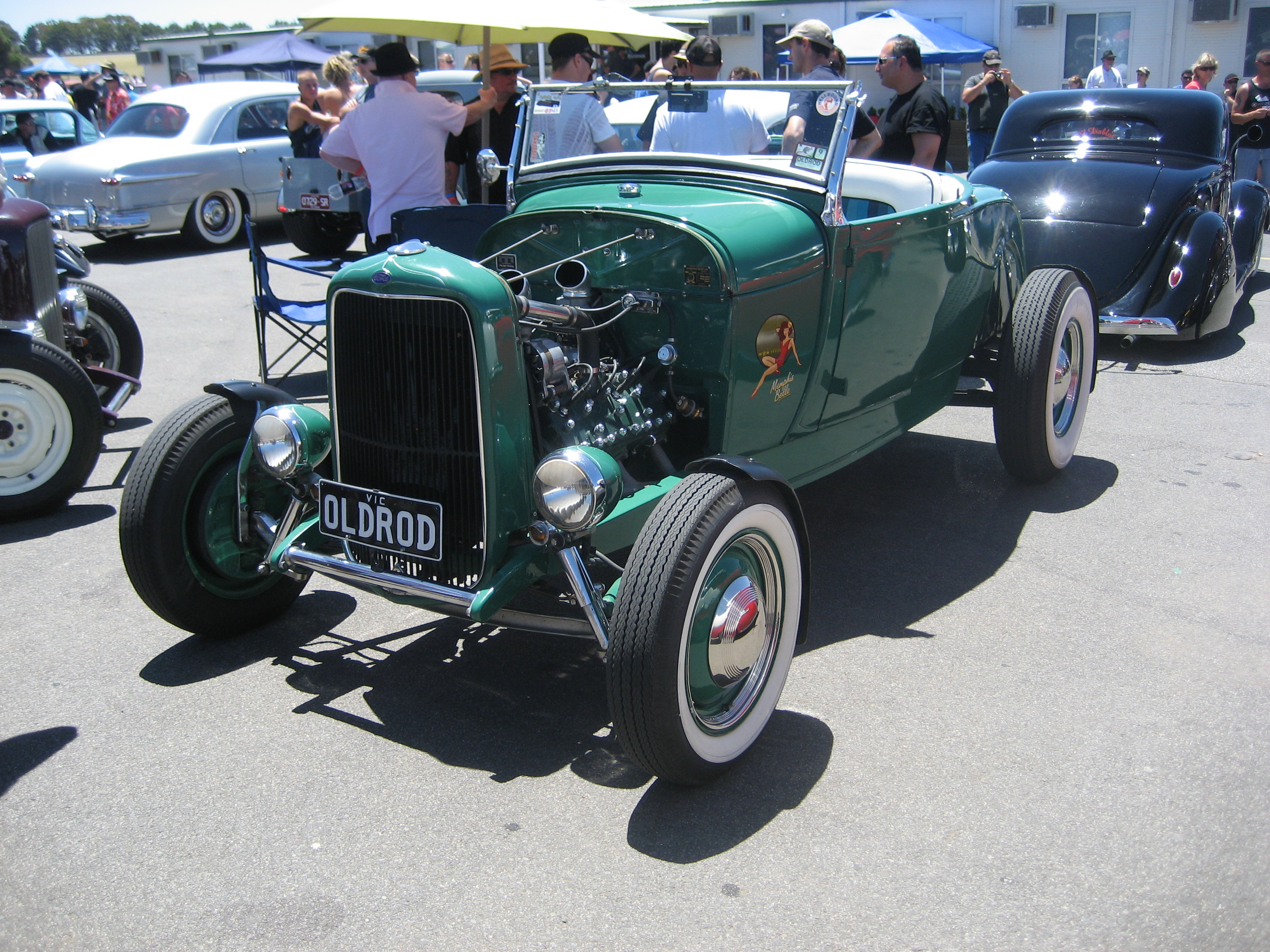
Hi-boy Deuce roadster with a flathead V8 (with factory head and exhaust but aftermarket alternator ignition and dual-carb intake), dropped tube axle, and drum brakes.

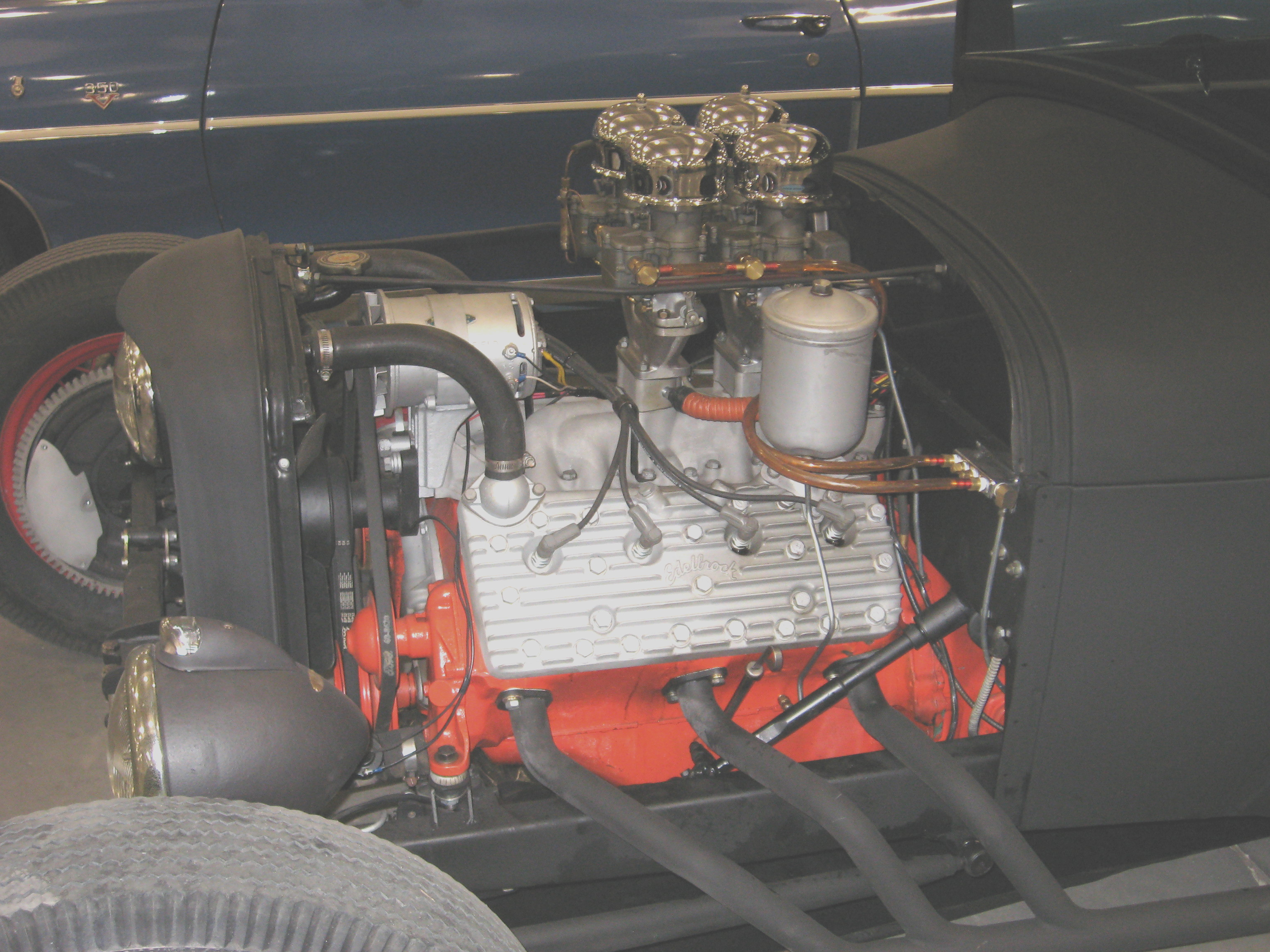
"Rat rod" '29 Model A coupe with a '32 grille shell, upgraded brakes, "bobbed" frame rails, channeled, powered by an early flathead equipped with Edelbrock aftermarket head and aftermarket chrome carb hats.

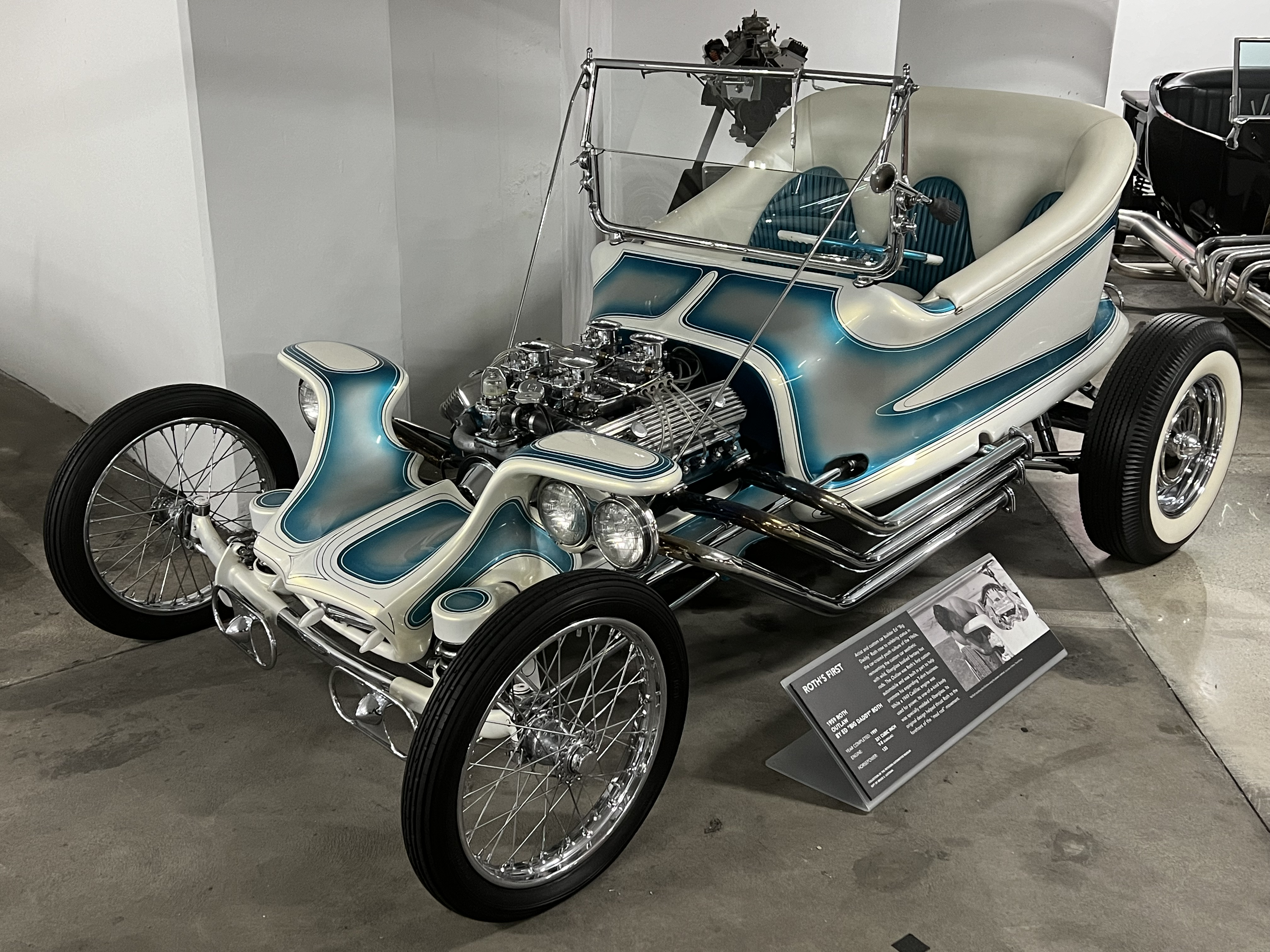
"The Outlaw", a famous show rod designed and built by Ed Roth

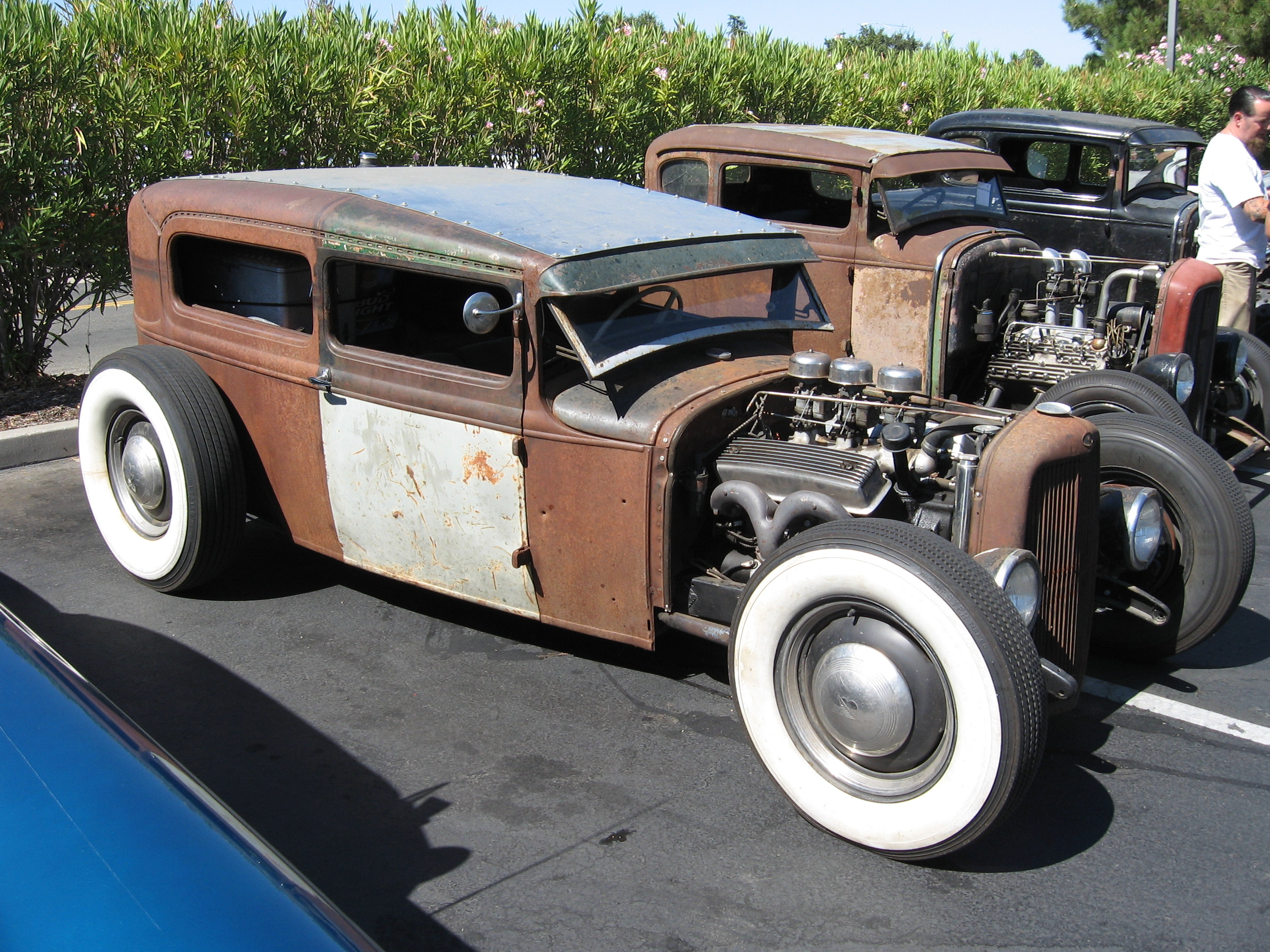
An example of a rat rod

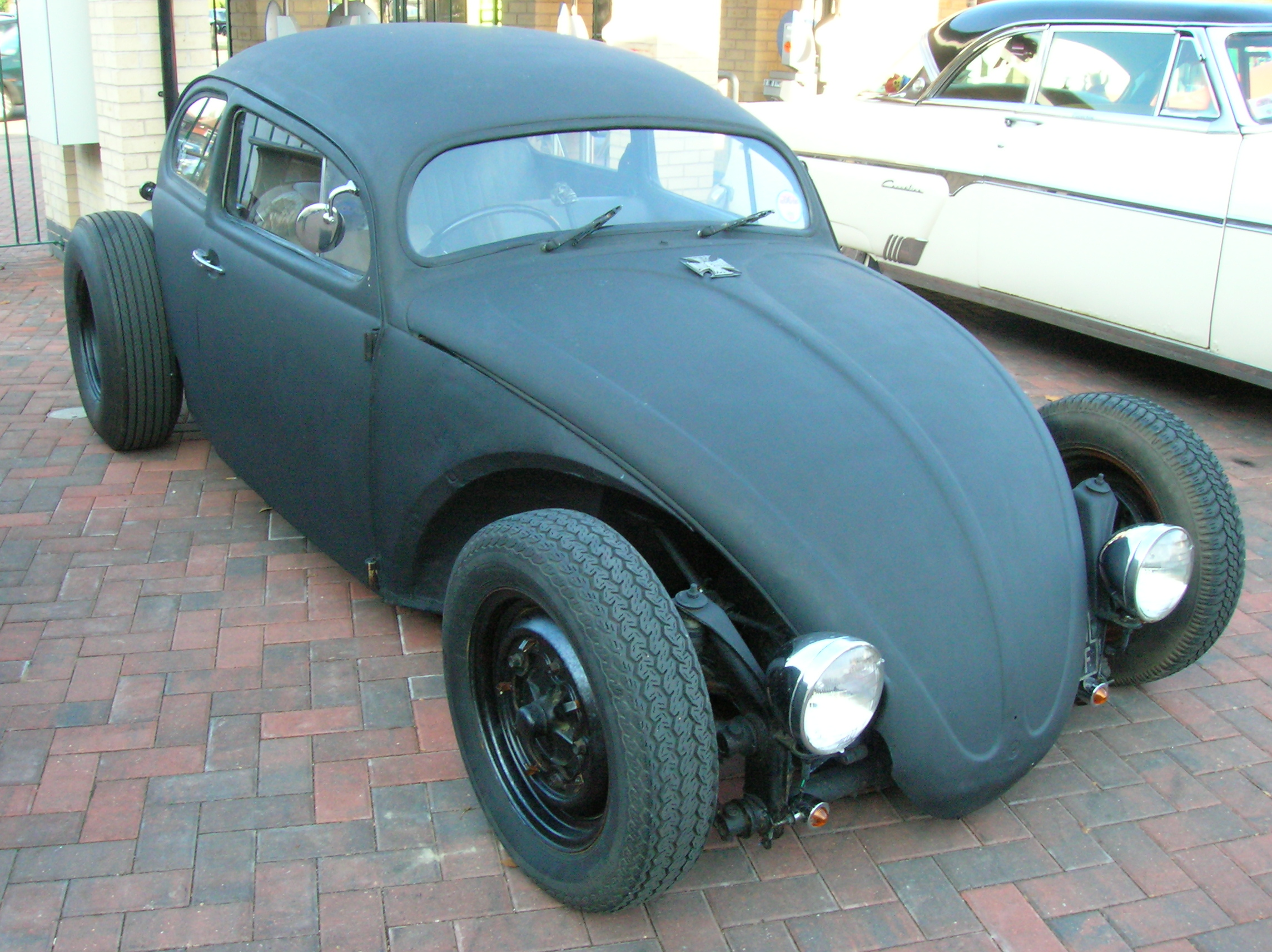
Volksrod, based on a Type 1.

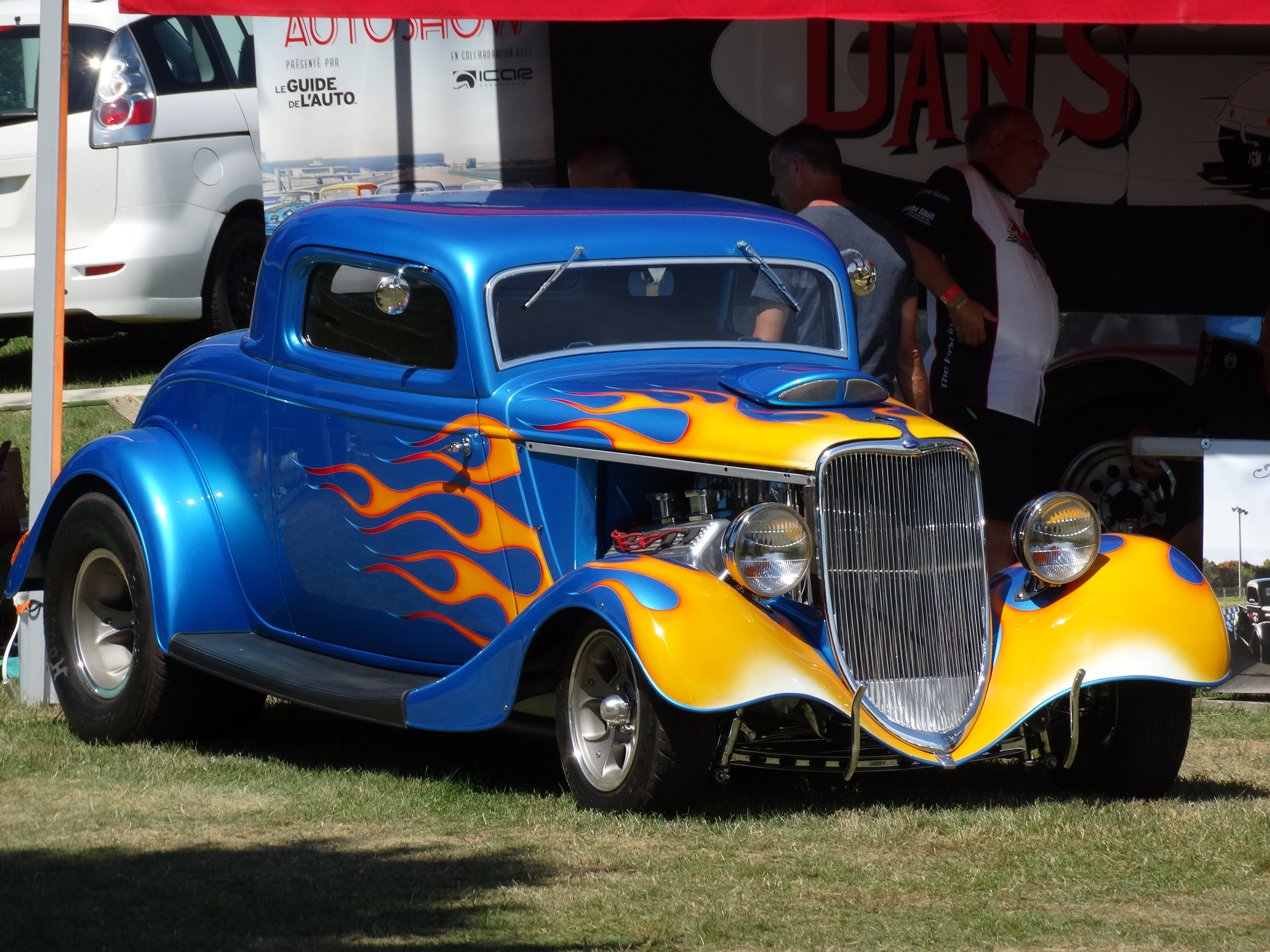
Classically flamed 3-window at the Voitures Anciennes de Granby expo, with drilled I-beam front axle, nerf bars, velocity stacks, mags, and slicks.

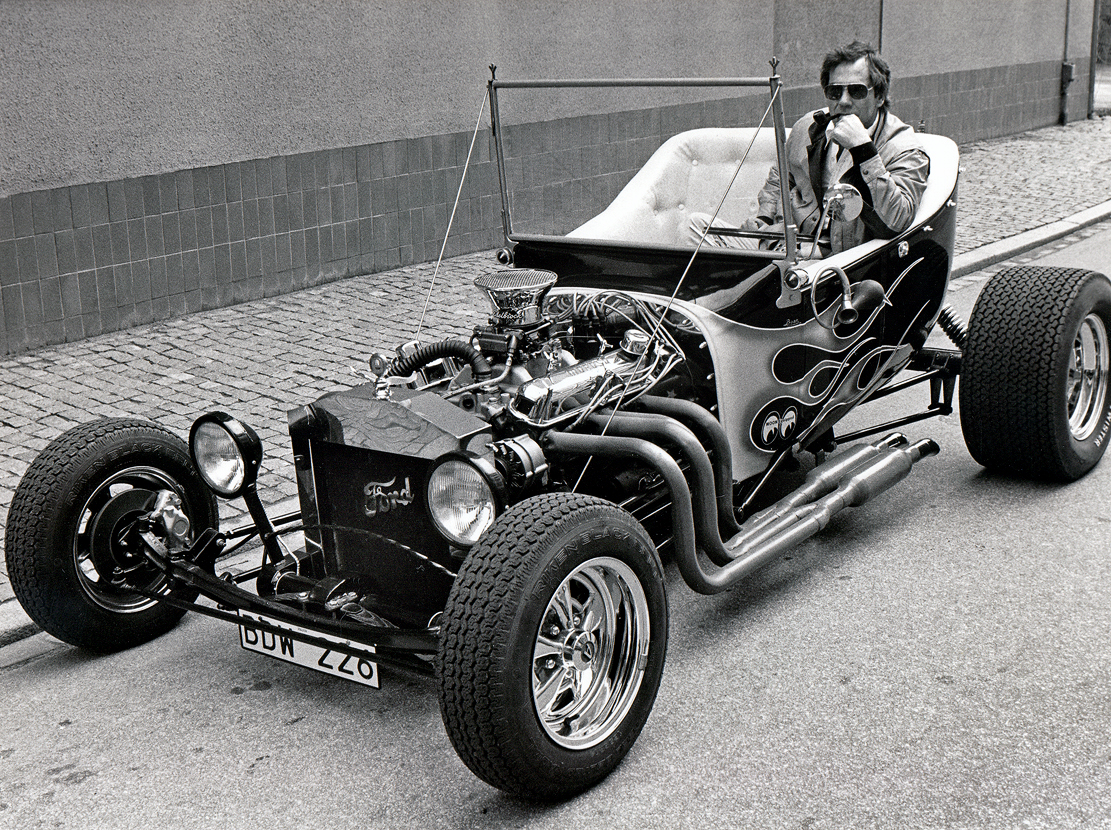
Swedish hot rod in Malmö 1986.

== See also ==
- Automotive restoration
- Custom car
- Cutdown
- Flame job
- Hot hatch
- Import scene
- Kustom
- Lead sled
- Lowrider
- Muscle car
- Plymouth Prowler – a modern take on the hot rod
- Pro Street
- Rat rod
- Three window coupe – one of the classic styles
- Tuner
- Volksrod
