= Body kit =

Optional body modifications for a car

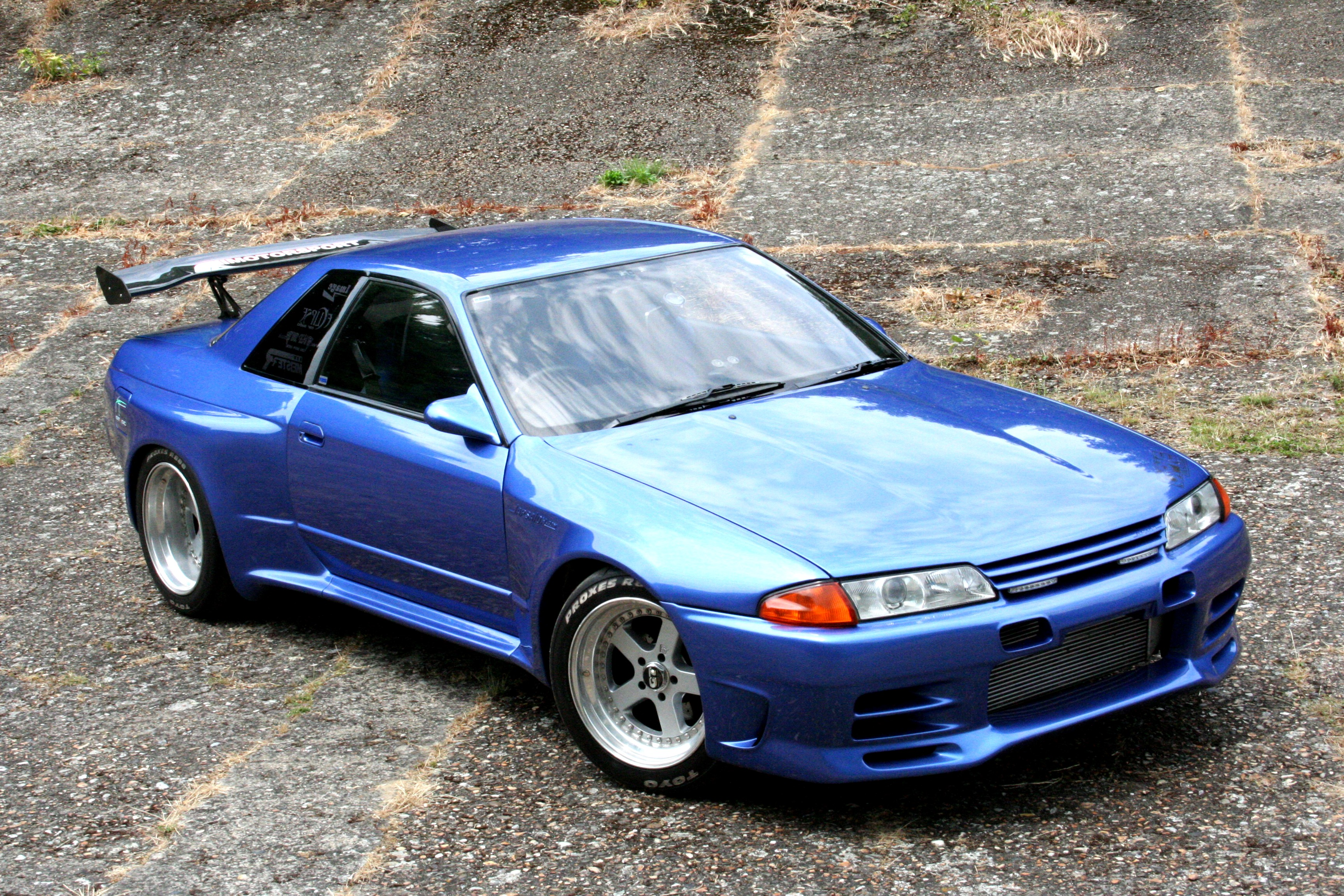
An R32 Nissan Skyline GT-R with a Veilside body kit

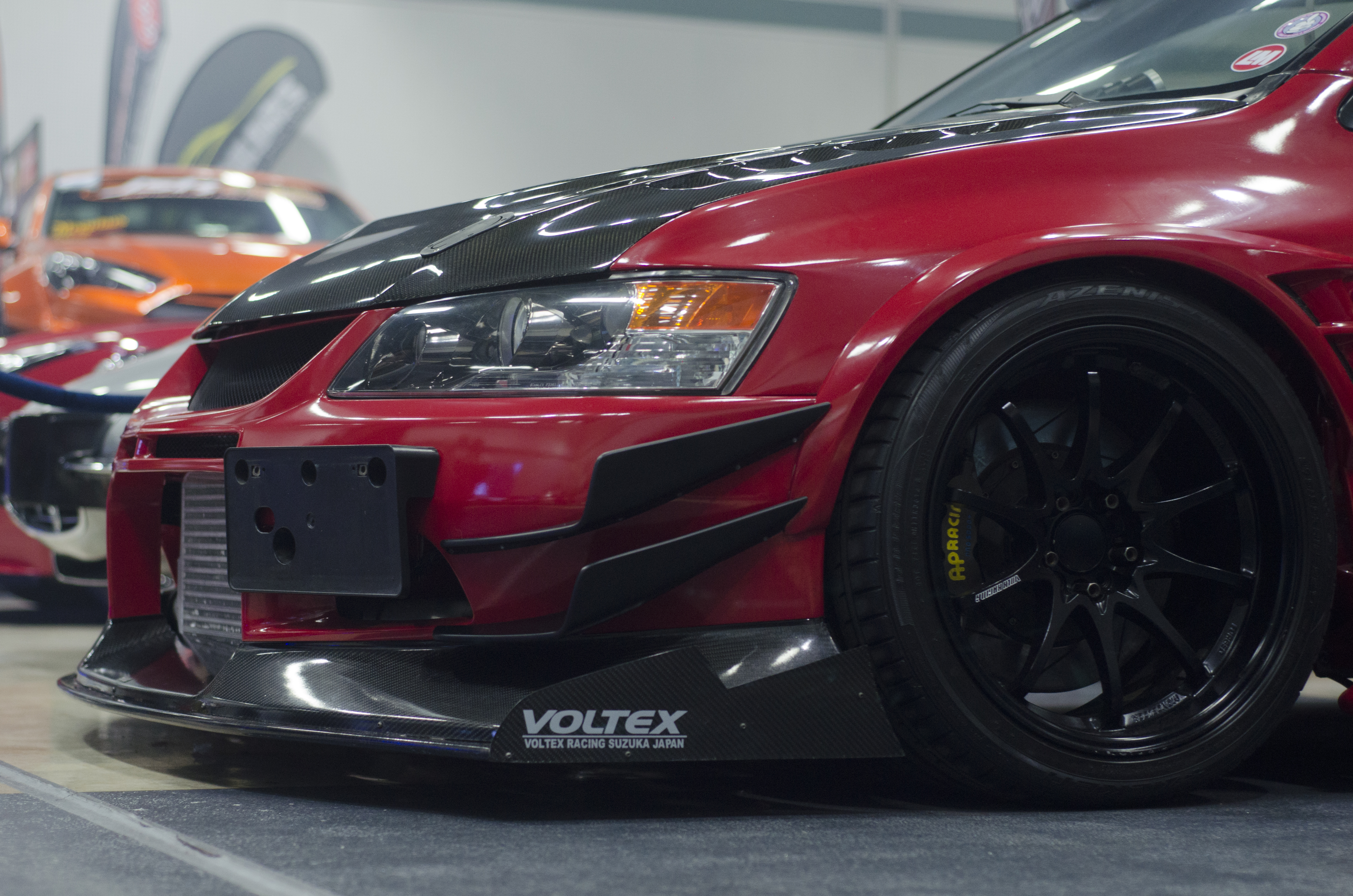
Front end of a Mitsubishi Lancer Evolution IX fitted with a Voltex kit

A body kit or bodykit is a set of modified body parts or additional components that are installed on a car. They are typically composed of front and rear bumpers, side skirts, spoilers, bonnets (bonnet scoop), and sometimes front and rear side guards and roof scoops. There are many companies that offer alternatives to the original factory appearance of the vehicle. Body kit components are designed to complement each other and work together as a complete design, but often owners will 'mix and match' pieces from different body kits.

Automotive body kits are usually constructed of either fiberglass, polyurethane, or in some cases metal or carbon fiber. Fiberglass is cheap and widely available, although it can crack upon impact. Polyurethane is popular because it is flexible and thus more resistant to damage. Carbon fiber body kits are rarer, due to the cost of the materials.

== History ==
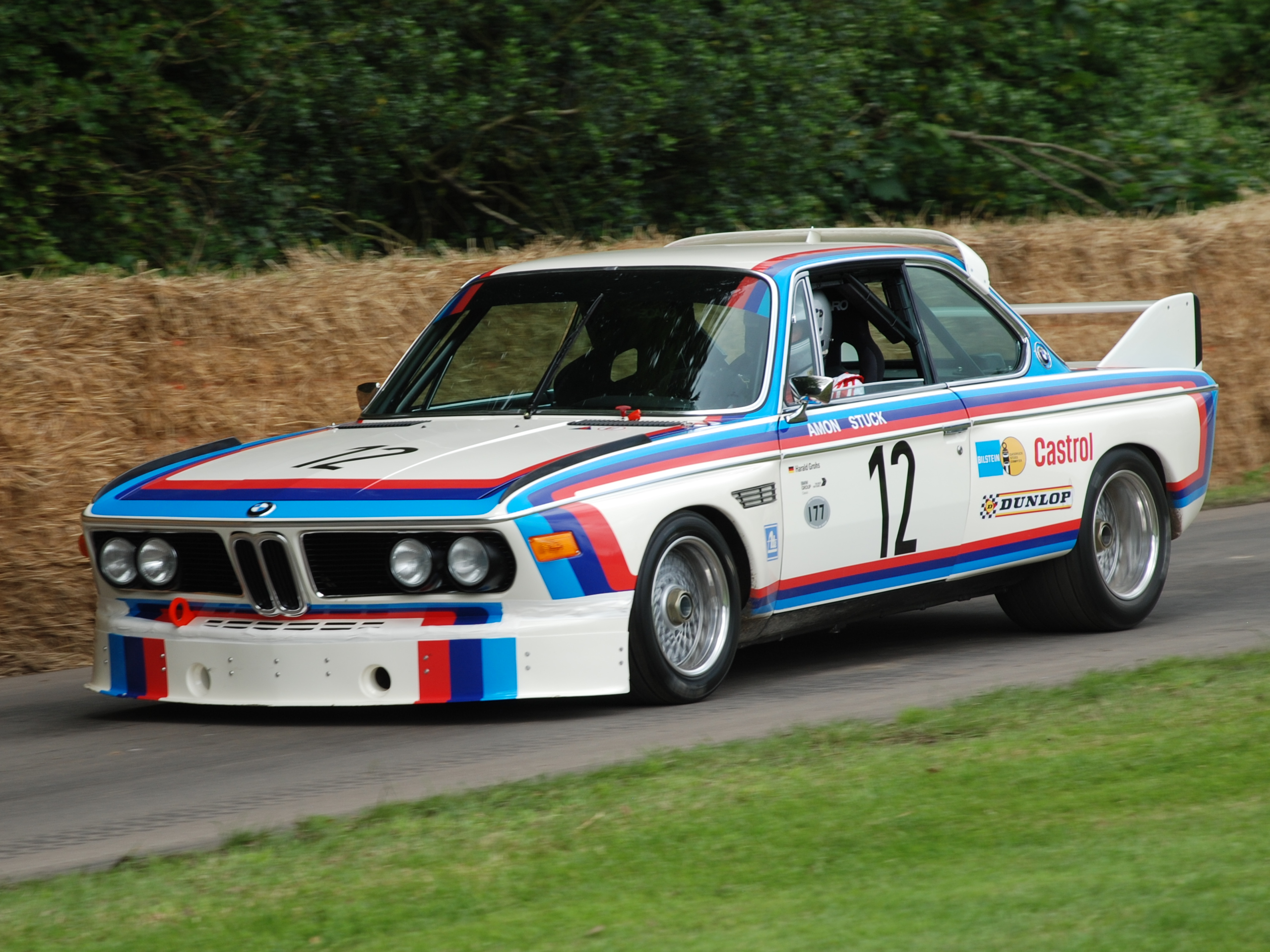
Many bodykits take inspiration from the design of racecars.

The roots of modern body kits go to the beginning of the first part of the 20th century. With the growing popularity of custom cars in America, many car enthusiasts were looking to alter the appearance of their vehicles in order to improve the performance characteristics or make their car look different from the others as a styling statement. Motorsport engineering also influenced the development of vehicle's body modifications, as certain changes in the construction of stock body parts allowed cars to achieve better results in terms of performance. Bumpers with bigger air dams and hood scoops deliver more fresh air to the engine, resulting in better performance output and heat reduction. Wide fenders or bolt-on flares allow fitting wider wheels. Trunk spoilers, bumper lips and bumper splitters reduce or properly distribute the down force, which improves the overall air dynamics of a vehicle. Although originally most popular on cars, body kits are now also offered for SUV and trucks. While some body kits are designed to be functional and improve the performance of a car, others are designed purely for aesthetics.

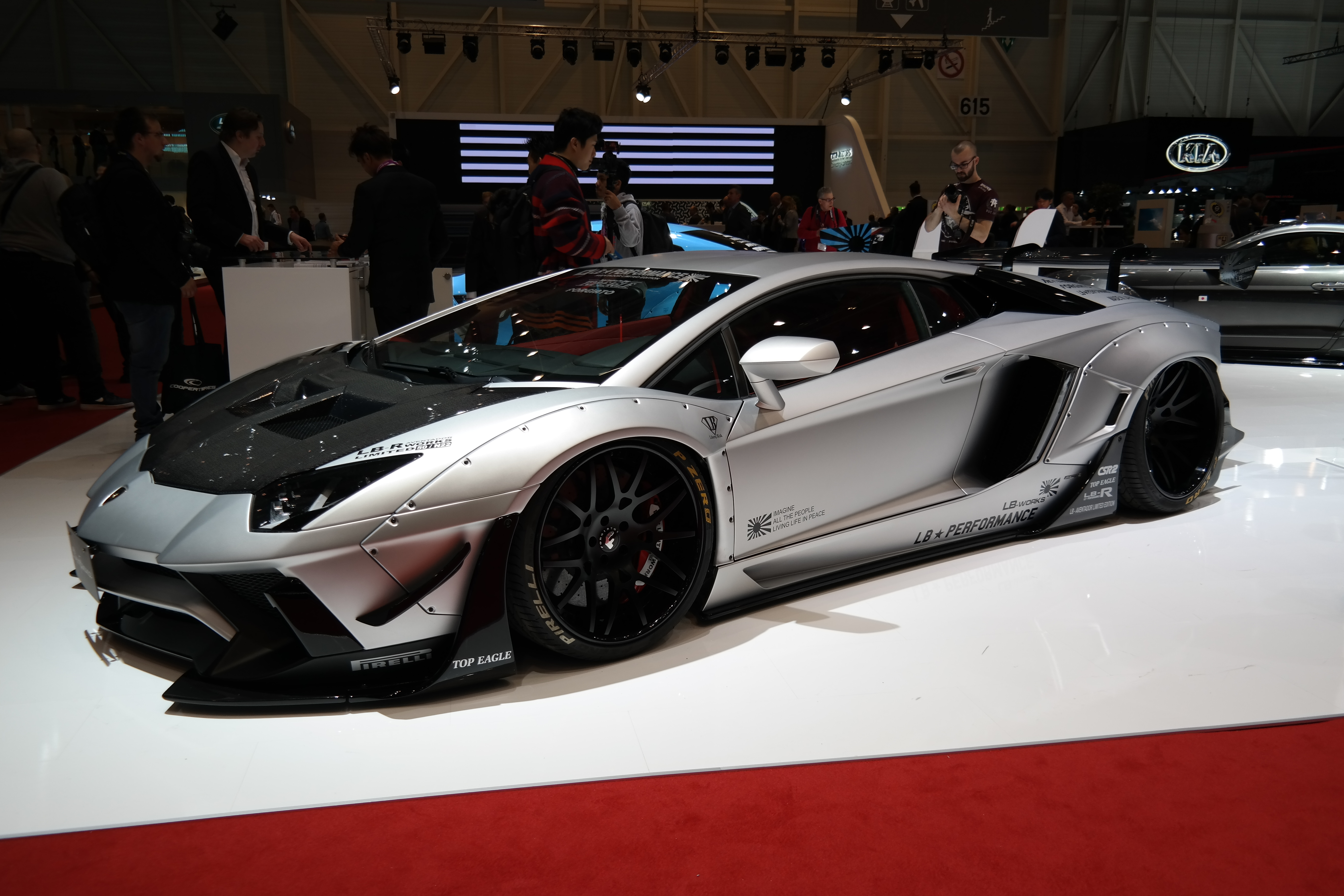
A Lamborghini Aventador fitted with a Liberty Walk body kit

Factory-fitted body kits have become more common, perhaps in response to the growth of the aftermarket tuning industry in the late 1990s and onwards. Many manufacturers now work in-house with their motorsport divisions to develop styling upgrades (such as HSV). Examples of well-known aftermarket body kit brands include Veilside, Mansory, Novitec Group, Hamann Motorsport, Liberty Walk and Rocket Bunny.

== Common body kit components ==
- Front and rear bumper
- Side skirts (rockers)
- Bumper lips
- Bumper canards
- Bumper diffusers
- Bumper splitters
- Bumper grilles
- Fenders with vents
- Fender flares
- Widebody fenders and quarter panels
- Spoilers
- Custom hoods
- Hood scoops
- Roof scoops
- Side scoops
- Window louvers
- One piece front end
- One piece rear end

== See also ==
- Automotive aftermarket
- Car tuning
- Custom car
- Downforce
- Import scene
- Kit car
- Pimp My Ride, a television series about vehicle restoration and modification that uses body kits extensively
- Stance (vehicle)
