= Polynesian (custom car) =

1952 customized 1950 Oldsmobile Holiday 88

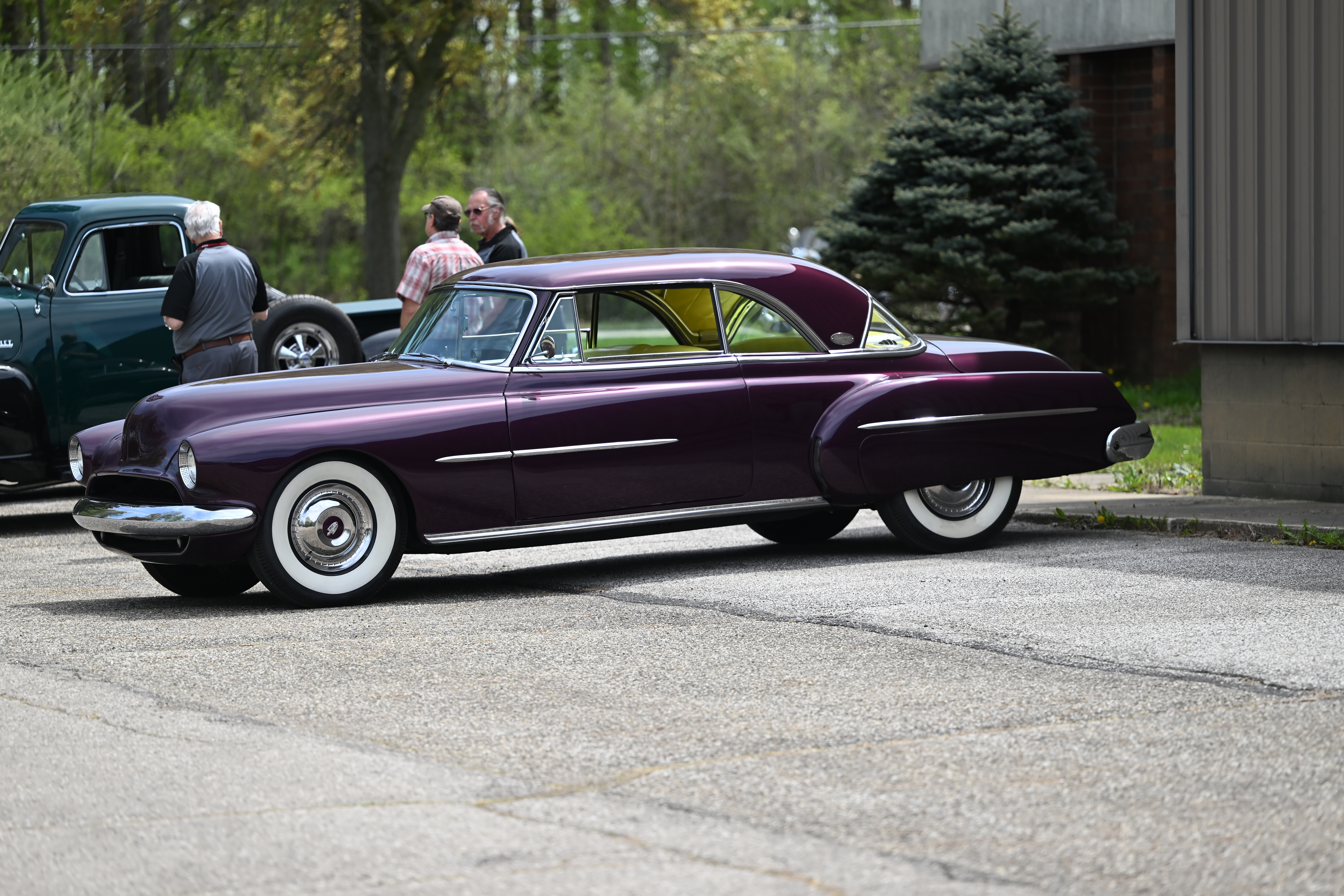
The Polynesian in 2023

Polynesian is a customized 1950 Oldsmobile Holiday 88 built by Neil Emory and Clayton Jensen at Valley Custom Shop. It was built at the request of original owner Jack Stewart in 1952. Inspired by Ron Dunn's sectioned '50 Ford, the car and its design were featured and described in multiple magazines over the 1950s.

== Construction ==
Unlike most owners at the time, Stewart wanted the car built all at once.

The car was inspired by Ron Dunn's sectioned '50 Ford, also built by Valley Custom, essentially to Stewart's original design; only his desire to have the top chop was changed, under persuasion from Emory.

The car was built over a period of nine months. It was sectioned 4 in (10 cm), wheelwells re-radiused, and the rear fenders bulges fitted with brake vents. It was nosed and decked, and the doors converted to electrically operated solenoids. 1947 Studebaker taillights were tunnelled into the rear fenders. The exhaust pipes exited through a modified rear bumper.

The engine was a 303 cu in (4,970 cc) Olds from an Oldsmobile 88, with 1952 heads and 4-barrel (4-choke) Rochester carburetor.

The interior was done by Wayne Tipton of Burbank at a cost of US$450, It was finished in lemon yellow and eggshell white tuck-and-rolled Naugahyde.

The car was finished in a shade of purple dubbed Orchid Flame, which lent the car its name. The total cost was US$1800.

Shortly after taking delivery, Stewart showed Polynesian at the Detroit Auto Show.

Polynesian was featured in the August 1953 issues of Hot Rod and Rod and Custom in September, and also saw 54 pages of construction details in Motor Trend Custom Car Annual in 1954.

== History ==
Stewart bought the car in 1950. After customizing was complete, he used it as a daily driver for several years before selling it to John Zagray. Zagray made some modifications of his own. Some time later, the car disappeared.

It resurfaced in 1971, when the owner of the Red Lacquer Room body and restoration shop, Gene Blackford, found the car in a barn near Robertsville, Ohio, where sixth owner Warren Wise had stored it. Blackford, who had first seen the car in its original custom form at age 12, paid Wise $1000 for what was left and put it in storage for thirty-three more years. In 2004, he and six friends began a complete restoration to the Valley Custom standard, a process which took nine months.

The newly restored Polynesian won the Preservation Award at the 2006 Detroit Autorama.

Blackford gave the engine a rebuild in 2006, and rebuilt the transmission in 2007.

Polynesian went on display at the Peterson Car Museum from 2006 to 2010.

Polynesian is currently owned by Ohio car collector Myron Vernis.

== Copies ==
The car inspired John Ballard's 1950 Oldsmobile, Polynesian II.

== Magazine appearances ==
- Hot Rod, September 1953
- Rod & Custom, September 1953
- Trend Book 109 Custom Cars 1954 Annual
- Car Craft, March 1954
- Auto Craftsman, December 1956
- Custom Rodder, June 1958
- Custom Cars, December 1958
- Custom Rodder, February 1959
