= VIP style =

Car modification trend

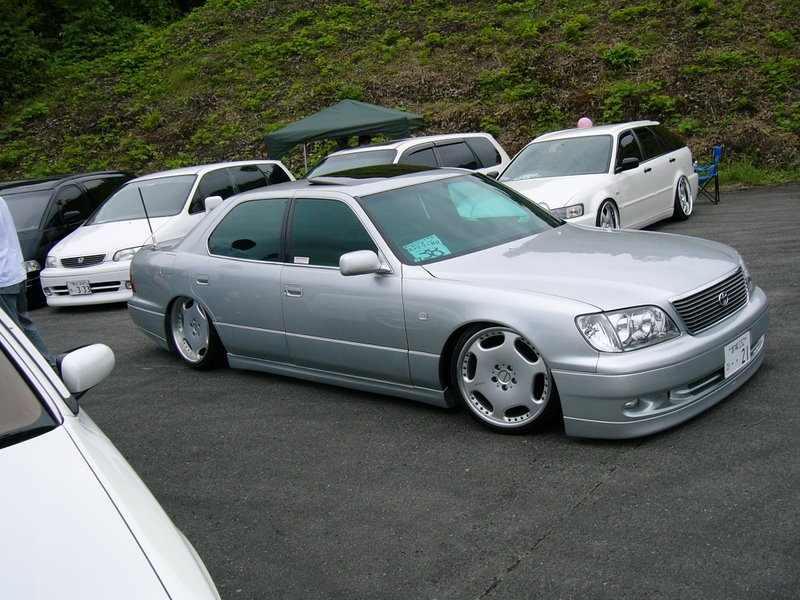
Japanese-built Toyota Celsior with VIP style modifications

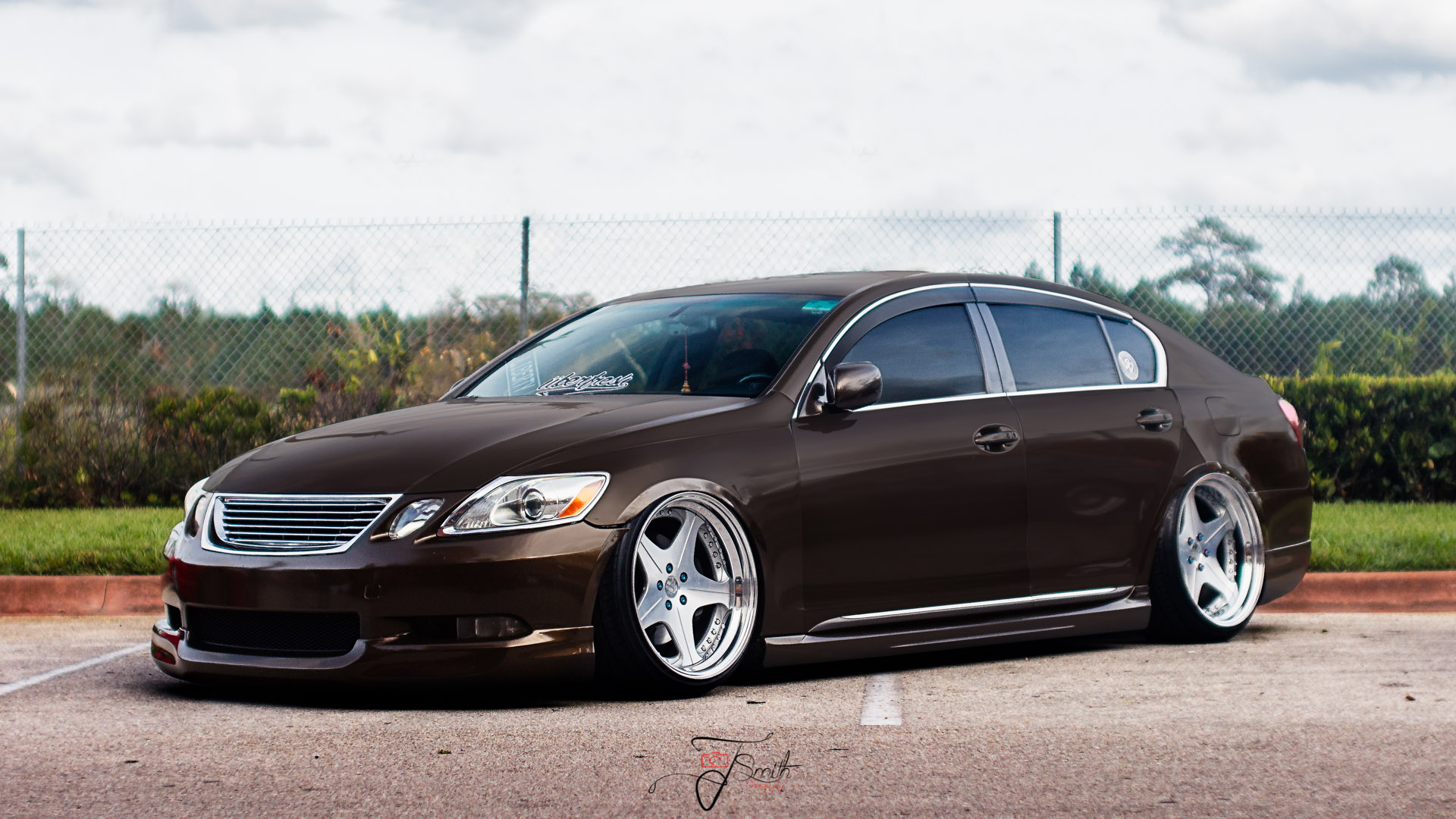
American-built VIP style Lexus GS

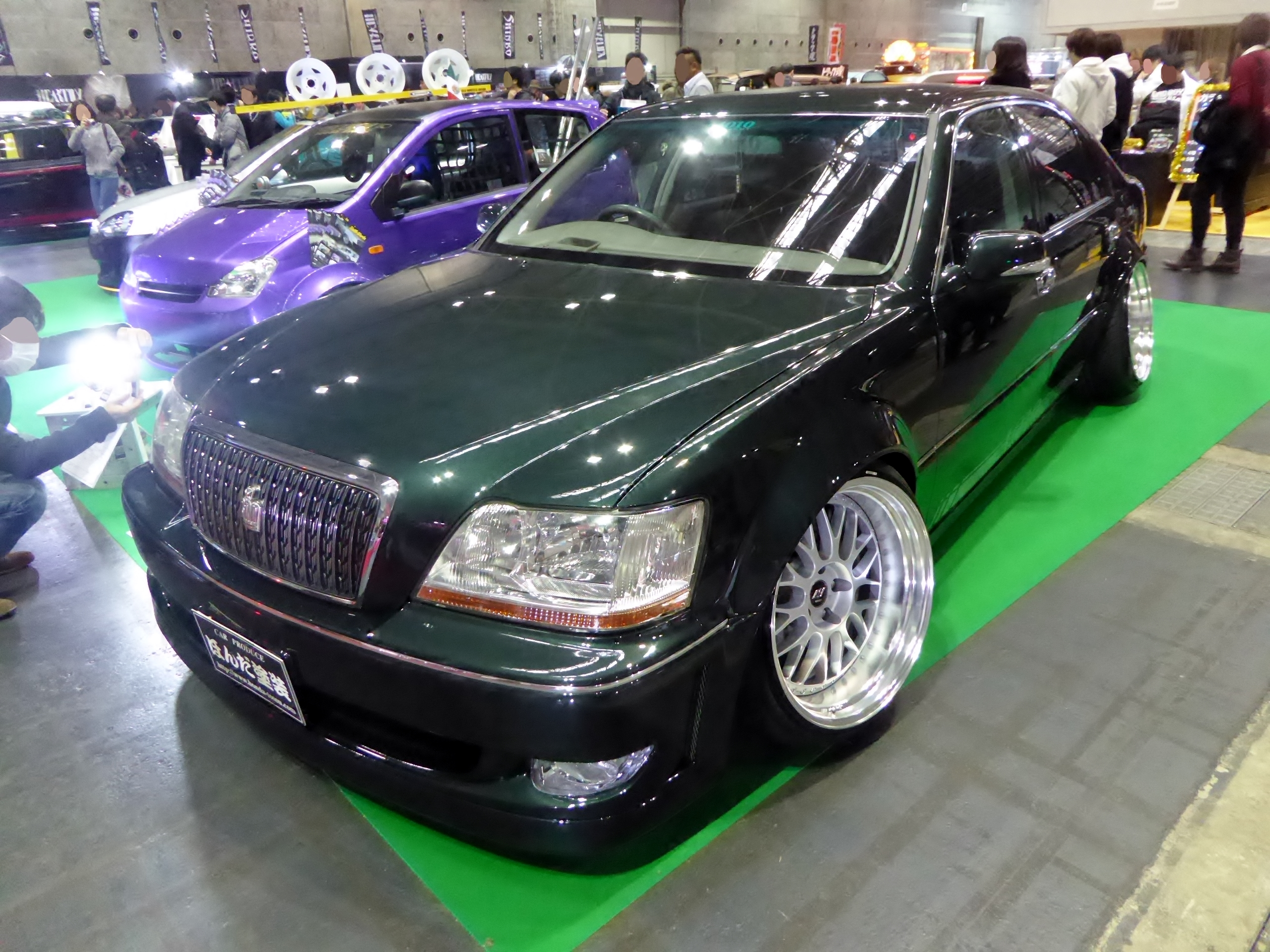
Japanese-built VIP style Toyota Crown Majesta at the 2016 Osaka Auto Messe.

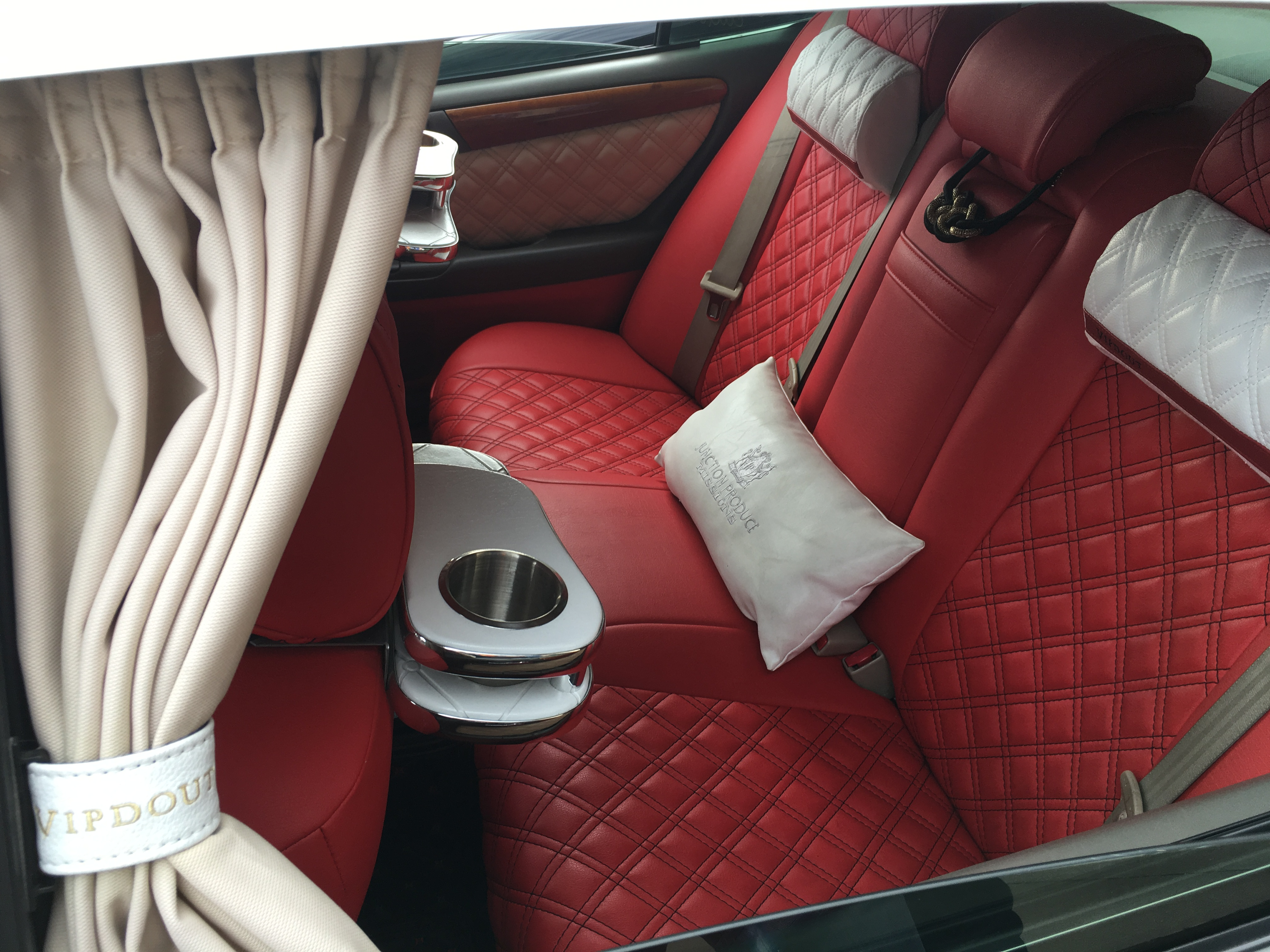
An American built VIP style Lexus GS showing off some VIP interior mods such as quilted leather seats, headrest pillows, tray tables and rear window curtains.

VIP style (Japanese: ビップカー, lit. 'VIP car') is a car modification trend that translates from the Romanised Japanese term 'bippu.' It refers to the modification of Japanese luxury automobiles to make them lower and wider in stance, with more aggressive wheels, suspension, and body kits. VIP Style cars are typically large, rear-wheel drive luxury sedans, although automotive enthusiasts sometimes use other cars such as minivans or kei cars.

VIP cars were once associated with the Yakuza; however, VIP style modifications are now a subset of their own as automotive modifications. As a trend, it differentiates itself from the traditional origins of the term VIP otherwise associated with the concept of a "very important person".

The VIP style has become a loose appropriation of the term perpetuated amongst enthusiasts that goes beyond traditional VIP cars.

== History ==
Early VIP style is said to have evolved partly from the Haiso style of modifying sedans in the 1980s. VIP modifications and their history have often been linked to the Yakuza, although the accuracy and extent of this connection is disputed. By using JDM cars with modifications associated with limousines, it is said that gangsters could avoid detection by the police and rival gangs.

Both Osaka street racers and Kanto-area bōsōzoku gangs adopted styles in different ways. Osaka street racers, after suffering numerous police crackdowns on the Hanshin Expressway in the early 1990s, turned to sedans, after police targeted sport compacts, as a way to cruise while remaining incognito. The bōsōzoku in Kanto took a somewhat different approach by modifying sedans with cut coils and mufflers. The resulting cars were often bold and loud and known as "Yankee Style". Their styling cues were actually taken from Super Silhouette race cars of the 1970s and 1980s. They also drove recklessly, such as causing traffic jams and avoiding paying tolls. To mimic their Yakuza counterparts, they used large black sedans.

== Characteristics ==
Common exterior modifications on VIP style cars include modified suspension to achieve a lowered ride height, typically using coilovers or air suspension, and often also modified or custom control arms, suspension knuckles, tie rods and more; 3 piece wheels, often in wide configurations with low offsets that sit flush with the fenders or tuck inside of them; modified exhausts; LED lighting; upgraded larger brakes; and body kits, which can range from simple lip kits or fender flares to more extensive custom widebody setups. It is not uncommon to see significant negative camber on many VIP style cars. Less commonly, some VIP cars have been known to feature chopped roofs, as well as grilles, headlights or taillights from other vehicles, typically a newer vehicle from the same brand (e.g. UCF30 Celsior front on a UCF20 Celsior) or from a European car such as a Mercedes.

Common interior modifications on VIP style cars include custom upholstery (most commonly leather), window curtains, headrest pillows, seat cushions, tray tables, upgraded stereo systems, illuminated trunk audio displays, storage for champagne flutes and alcoholic drinks, chandeliers, starlight headliners, and more. Traditional VIP style colours are black, white, grey and silver, however, as the style has evolved, many builders have also embraced more bright and flashy colors as well.

The appearance of these vehicles is regarded in Japan as conspicuous and attention-seeking, as owning this type of vehicle is expensive with regards to Japan's annual road taxes.

== Cars used ==
The majority of VIP cars are luxury sedans from Japanese automakers such as Toyota (Aristo, Celsior, Century, Crown Majesta, Crown) and Nissan (Cedric/Gloria/Fuga, Cima/President), as well as sometimes Honda (Legend, Vigor/Inspire), Mitsubishi (Proudia/Dignity, Diamante), and Mazda (Sentia/929, Millenia). Mid size sedans from these brands are also often used. Although most VIP builders use Japanese cars, certain foreign cars have also been popular, most notably many sedan models from Mercedes, as well as the Chrysler 300. As automotive enthusiasts began to put their own spin on VIP, everything from minivans like the Toyota Estima and Honda Odyssey, to smaller cars like the Suzuki Wagon R and Toyota bB, have received similar modifications.

American enthusiasts often use USDM Japanese sedans, such as the Lexus GS, Lexus LS, Infiniti Q45, Infiniti M45, and Acura RL. Sometimes, American enthusiasts will swap the badges for their JDM counterparts (i.e., Toyota Celsior badges on a Lexus LS), while some Japanese enthusiasts do the opposite and put USDM badges on their cars.

Some of the brands commonly associated with VIP style modifications include Artisan Spirits, Aimgain, Admiration Amistad, BBS, Black Pearl Complete, Fabulous, Garson, Impul, Job Design, J-Unit, Junction Produce, K-Break, Mode Parfume, OZ, SSR, Super Star Wheels, T-Demand, Ulterior Motives, Vlene, Wald, Weds, Work Wheels and 326power.

== See also ==
- Stance (vehicle)
