= Custom car =

Passenger vehicle that has been altered

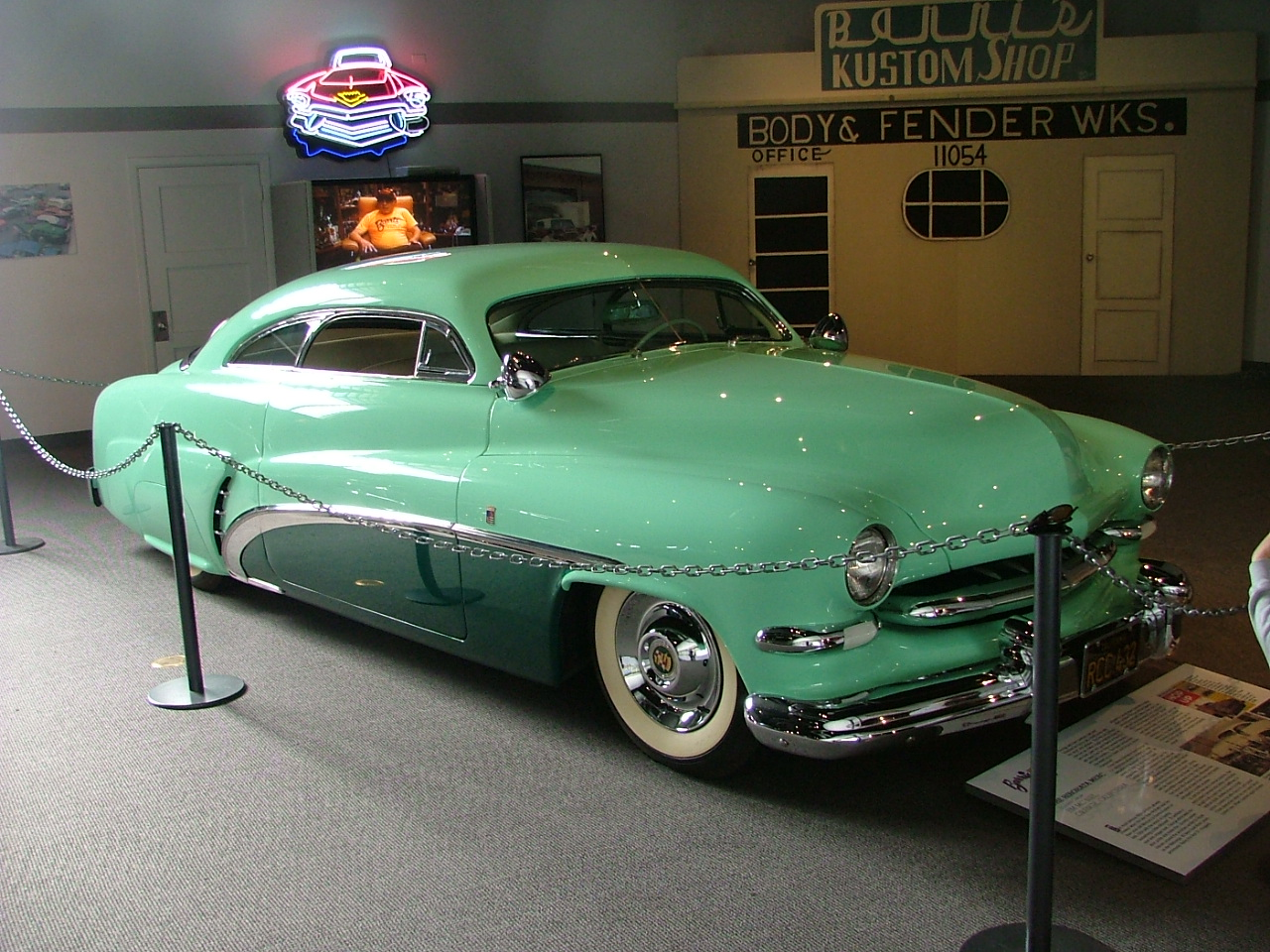
One of the famous custom cars in the classic American custom style, the Hirohata Merc

A custom car is a passenger vehicle that has been altered to improve its performance, change its aesthetics, or both. Some automotive enthusiasts in the United States want to push "styling and performance a step beyond the showroom floor - to truly craft an automobile of one's own." A custom car in British usage, according to Collins English Dictionary, is built to the buyer's own specifications.

Custom cars are not to be confused with coachbuilt automobiles, historically rolling chassis fitted with luxury bodywork by specialty auto body builders.

== History ==
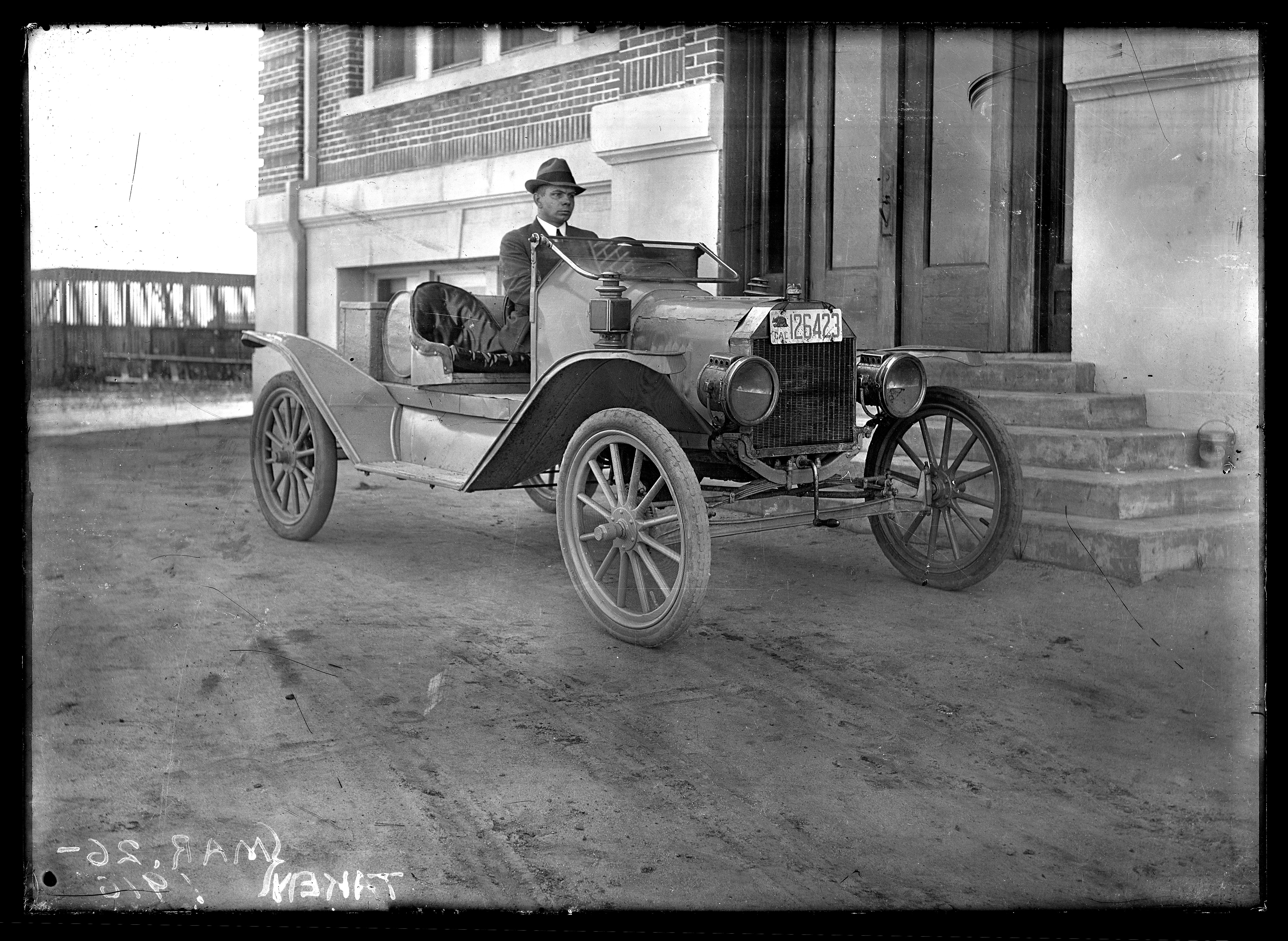
1916 Ford Model T modified into a speedster, an early form of customized car

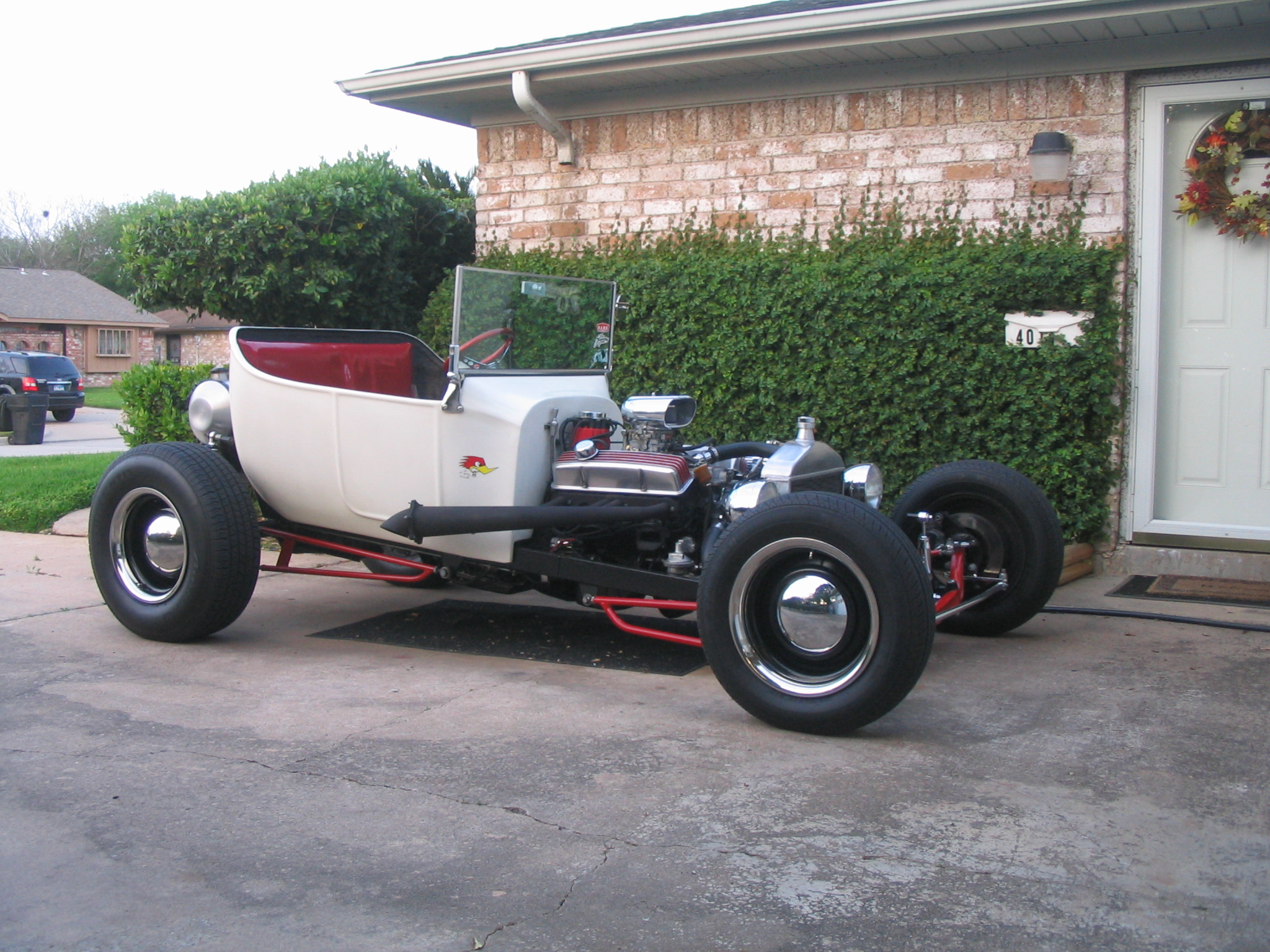
A 1923 Ford T-bucket in the traditional hot rod style

Some of the earliest examples of modified cars were cars modified for racing or off-roading. The coachbuilding industry is considered part of custom car history, as companies and individuals built custom bodies to be fitted to early cars and inspired later customizers.

Hot rods were an early type of custom car first popularized in the United States, considered to be one of the earliest defined car customization movements. The origins of the first hot rods are typically considered to be early race cars built to race on dirt tracks and dry lake beds, often stripped down Ford Model Ts, Model As, and other pre-World War II cars made into speedsters and "gow jobs". The "gow job" morphed into the hot rod in the 1940s to 1950s. The modified cars used in the Prohibition era by bootleggers to evade revenue agents and other law enforcement are also considered a predecessor to the hot rod. Hot rods gained popularity after World War II, particularly in California, because many returning soldiers had received technical training. Many cars were "hopped up" with engine modifications such as adding additional carburetors, high compression heads, and dual exhausts. The suspension was often altered, and engine swaps were to install the most powerful engine in the lightest possible frame and body combination.

Another example of early automobile customization were the first off-road vehicles. Some of the earliest dedicated offroad vehicles were made using the Kégresse track system, starting in the late 1910s, which affixed tracks to an ordinary car in place of the rear wheels for improved off-road traction. After World War II, the surplus of army Jeeps led to a growth in the popularity of off-roading as a hobby.

Starting in the early 1940s, some US car customizers began to modify cars with a stronger emphasis on looks and self-expression. This led to styles of modification such as lowriders, kustoms and lead sleds emerging and growing. 1950s kustom car builders would often swap trim and panels from other cars, cut through the sheet metal and remove bits to make the car lower, weld it back together, and add lead to make the resulting form smooth. They would also chop the roof to make it lower, section the body to make it thinner from top to bottom, and channel the body by cutting notches in the floorpan where the body touches the frame to lower the whole body.

The first drag strip in the United States opened in 1950 on an airfield in Southern California, and a year later, in 1951 the National Hot Rod Association was formed. In the following years, more drag strips were built across the country, leading to a rise in the popularity of drag racing among both amateurs and professionals.

In the post-World War II era, Japan's automotive industry grew, eventually leading to the country becoming the world's largest vehicle producer. This led to a unique car customization culture within the nation. Some of the early custom cars in Japan, starting in the late 1970s through the 1980s, included Kaido Racers, Japanese cars modified with homemade parts to look like racecars of the time; imported and modified American and European cars; cars modified for top-speed and highway racing; and Dekotora decorated trucks. The 1990s saw the rise of cars modified for drifting, VIP style luxury sedans, and the continued popularity of highway racing. Japan also embraced American customization styles, importing and building their muscle cars, lowriders, minitrucks, and more.

== Styles of modification ==
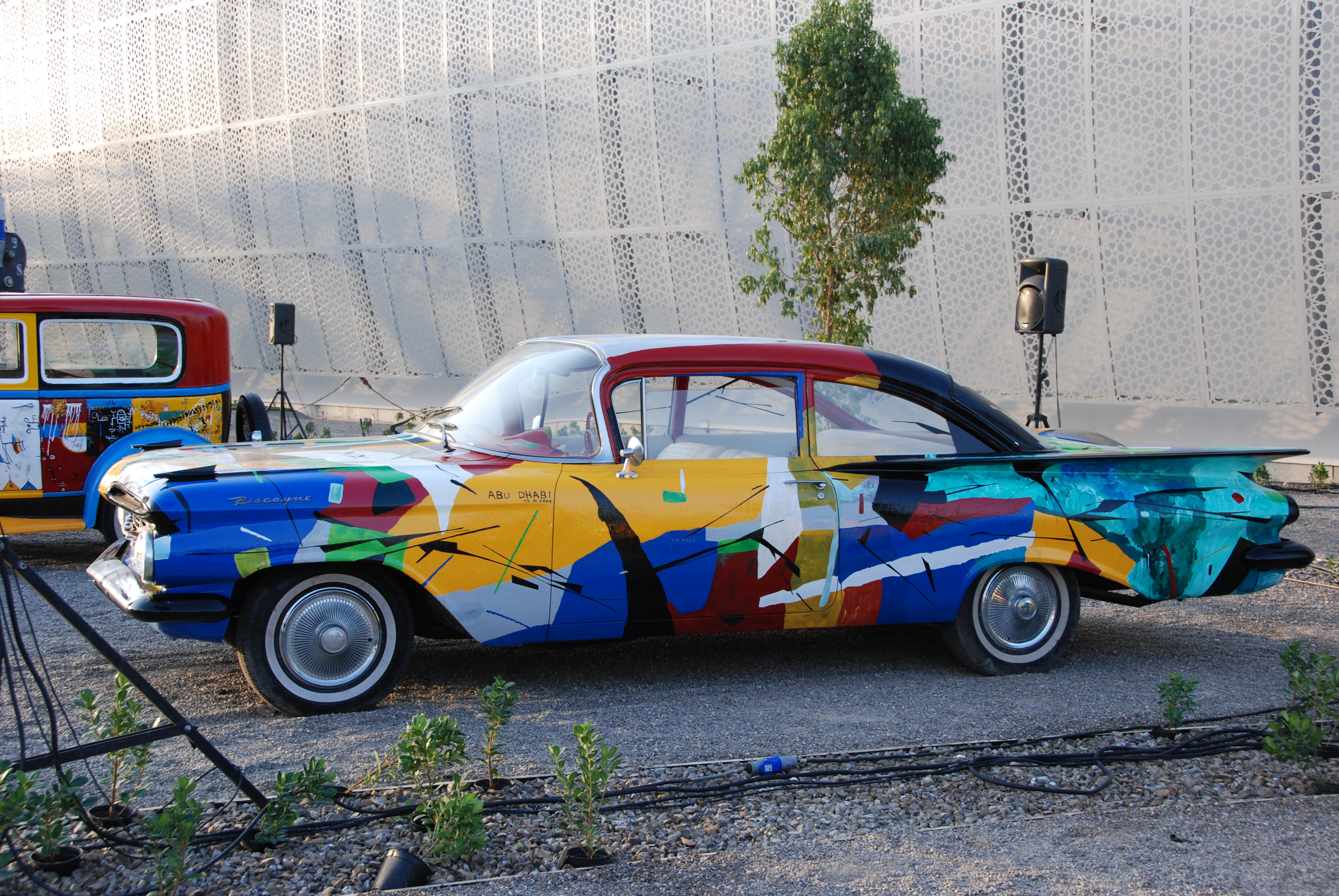
1959 Chevrolet Impala Art car

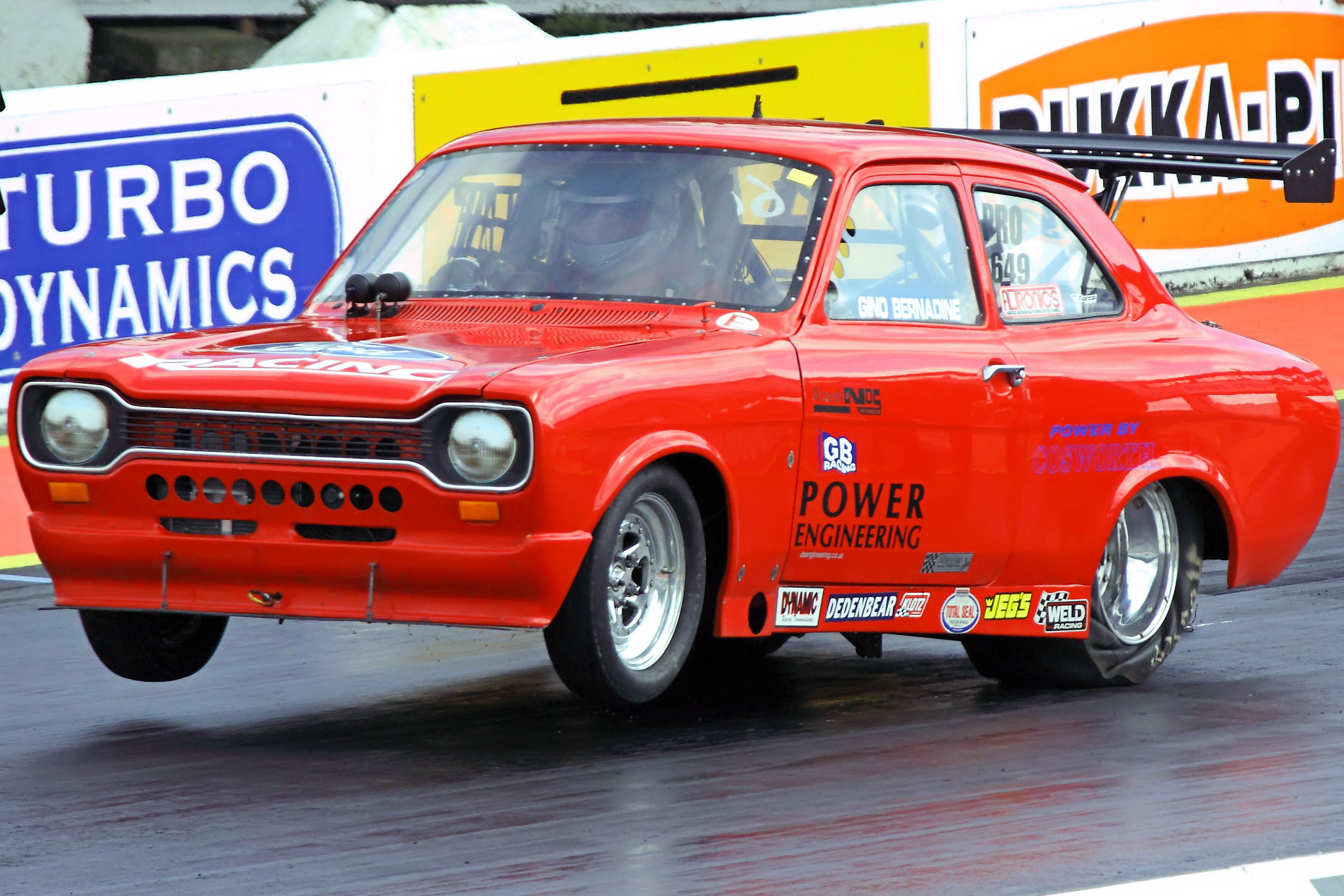
Ford Escort modified for drag racing

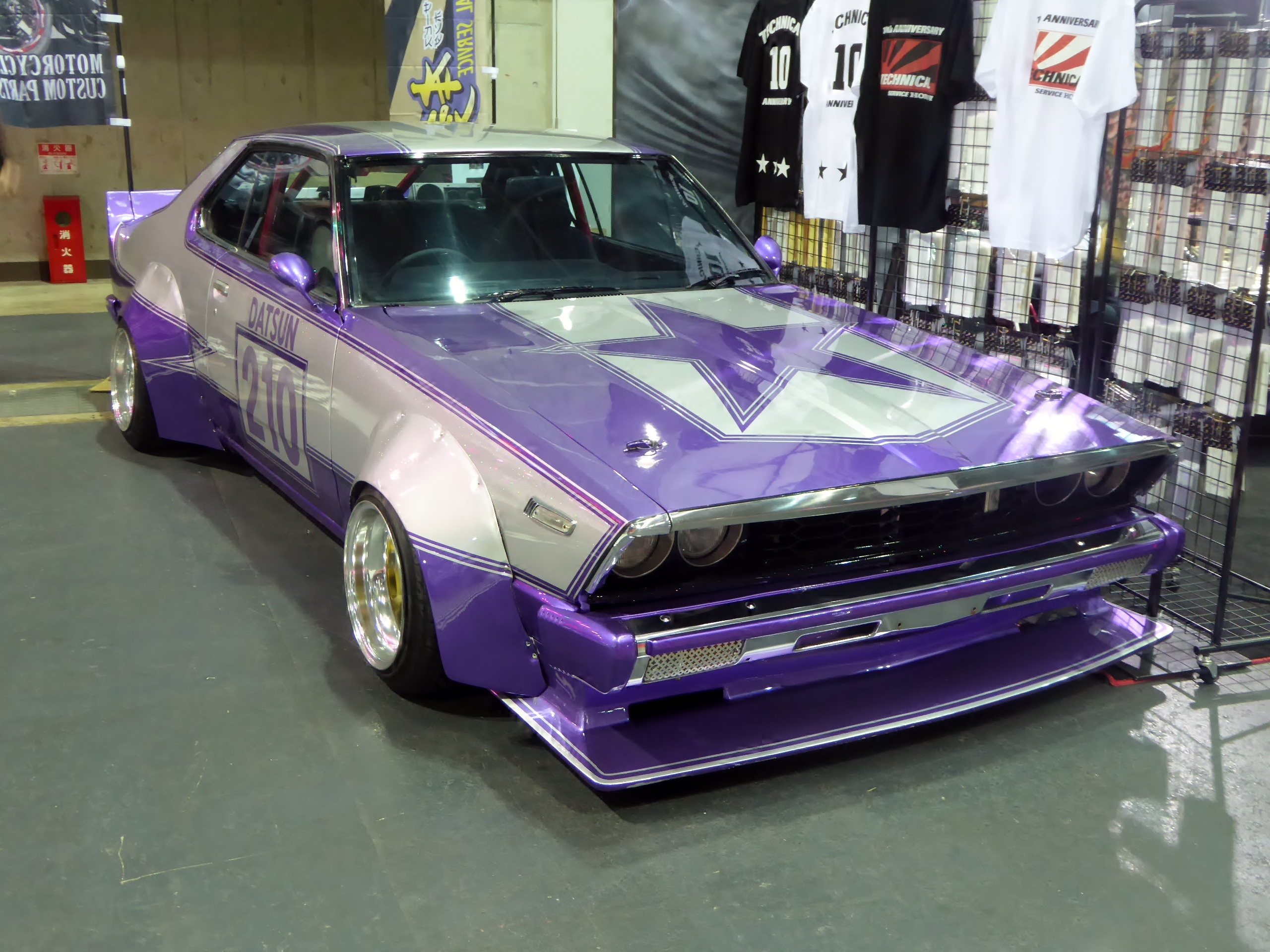
Nissan Skyline C210 modified in the Japanese Kaido Racer style

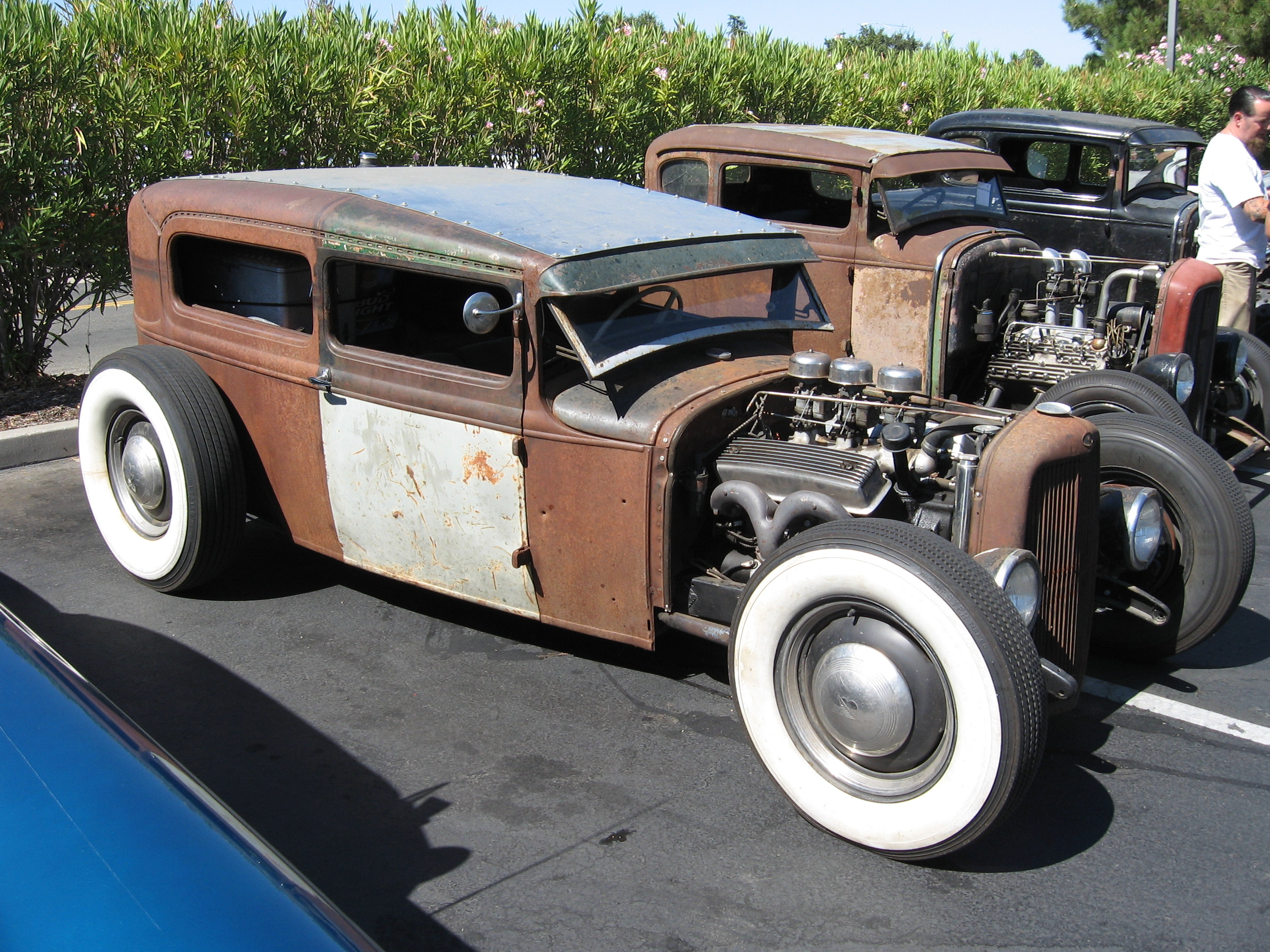
An example of a rat rod

Modified cars can be significantly different from their stock counterparts. A common factor among owners/modifiers is to emulate the visual and/or performance characteristics of established styles and design principles. These similarities may be unintentional. Some of the many different styles and visual influences to car modification are:

- Art car: Cars painted or decorated to be art pieces.
- Cal look: A modified classic Volkswagen intended to evoke California through bright colours, trim, and accessories.
- Drag car: Cars modified for drag racing
- Drift car: Cars modified for drifting.
- Dub or donk or Hi-Riser: Characterized by huge wheels with low-profile tires, often with upgraded speaker setups, and sometimes custom paint, interiors, and engine upgrades.
- Euro style: Stanced with one-off paint and small wheels, with shaved features to define car body lines.
- German look: A Volkswagen Type 1, Type 3, or Karmann Ghia lowered and fitted with late model Porsche mag wheels and touring car-influenced styling. Heavily modified suspension and drivetrain with emphasis on handling and cornering.
- Hot rod: Style primarily consisting of period-specific vehicles, components, and finishes to reproduce characteristics of early drag cars from the 1930s and 1940s.
- Import or JDM: tuned Japanese vehicles.
- Itasha: cars decorated with images of characters from anime, manga, or video games
- Kaido Racer: Japanese style of cars typically with lowered suspension, bright paint jobs, extreme body kits, and extended exhausts, sometimes inspired by Japanese Group 5 "Super Silhouette" racecars. Commonly associated with the Bōsōzoku.
- Kustom: Style primarily consisting of American cars built from the 1930s to 1960s customized in the styles of that period.
- Lowrider: Hydraulic or airbag suspension setups, custom paint, pinstriping, custom interior, and, typically, small diameter wire wheels. Others may look like straight restorations, aside from a low stance.
- Military/service style: Cars designed to look like certain service vehicles.
- Off-roader: Cars, SUVs, and trucks modified for off-roading, such as overlanding, rock crawling, or desert racing.
  - Chopped (and stretched): typically body-on-frame SUV with the rear cargo area, body and/or row(s) of seats chopped off, leaving only the frame. A full alloy tray and canopy are then put into this space. Wheelbase maybe extended to allow more space for cargo and passengers.
  - Carolina squat: the front of a truck is lifted significantly higher than the rear, creating a "squatting" appearance. The California lean or Cali lean is the less pronounced version.
- Outlaw: Typically Porsches 356, 911 and Karmann Ghias modified with more powerful engines, brakes, and a more aggressive appearance. This movement took place in Southern California in the 1960s.
- Race car: Cars built to compete in auto racing.
- Rally car: Cars built to compete in rallies.
- Rat rod: A style of hot rod and custom cars, imitating the "unfinished" appearance of some hot rods in the 1940s, 1950s, and 1960s. "Rat style" also defines a car kept on the road despite visible heavy wear.
- Restomod: Classic cars that combine original exterior styling with modern applied technologies (such as new suspension, wheels, transmission) or modern interior features (multimedia, etc.) for comfortable everyday use.
- Siren kings: A New Zealand Pasifika subculture where cars or bicycles are modified with loudspeakers or public address systems for use in competitive battles.
- South London look: Subtly modified 1950s-1970s British Fords that are lowered, with pastel paint and 13-inch Lotus Cortina steel wheels or RS, Minilite, or Revolution mag wheels. These cars often use a tuned Ford Kent or Pinto engine.
- Slab: Originated in the Houston area in the mid-1980s—usually, a full-size American luxury car fitted with custom "elbows", a type of extended wire wheels which protrude out from the fenders, loudspeaker setups, and neon signage inside the trunk panel. Other "slab" modifications include hydraulic-actuated trunk panels (a "pop trunk"), candy paint, vertical stainless steel trim on the trunk panel (known as "belt buckles"), aftermarket grille, and the use of a Cadillac front-end sheet metal conversion. The interiors of slabs are usually clad in beige or tan (in what is called a "peanut butter interior"). Usually associated with Houston hip hop music.
- Sleeper: High performance car that appears to be unmodified low performance car.
- Stanced: This style is mainly associated with sports and passenger cars with lowered suspension setups. Custom wheels with low-profile tires play a prominent role in this style and often feature aggressive sizes, offsets, and camber.
- VIP style: A Japanese style of customizing luxury cars.

== Types of customizations ==
Customized cars can feature a variety of different visual and mechanical modifications, ranging from paint jobs and modified body panels, to upgraded engines and suspension.

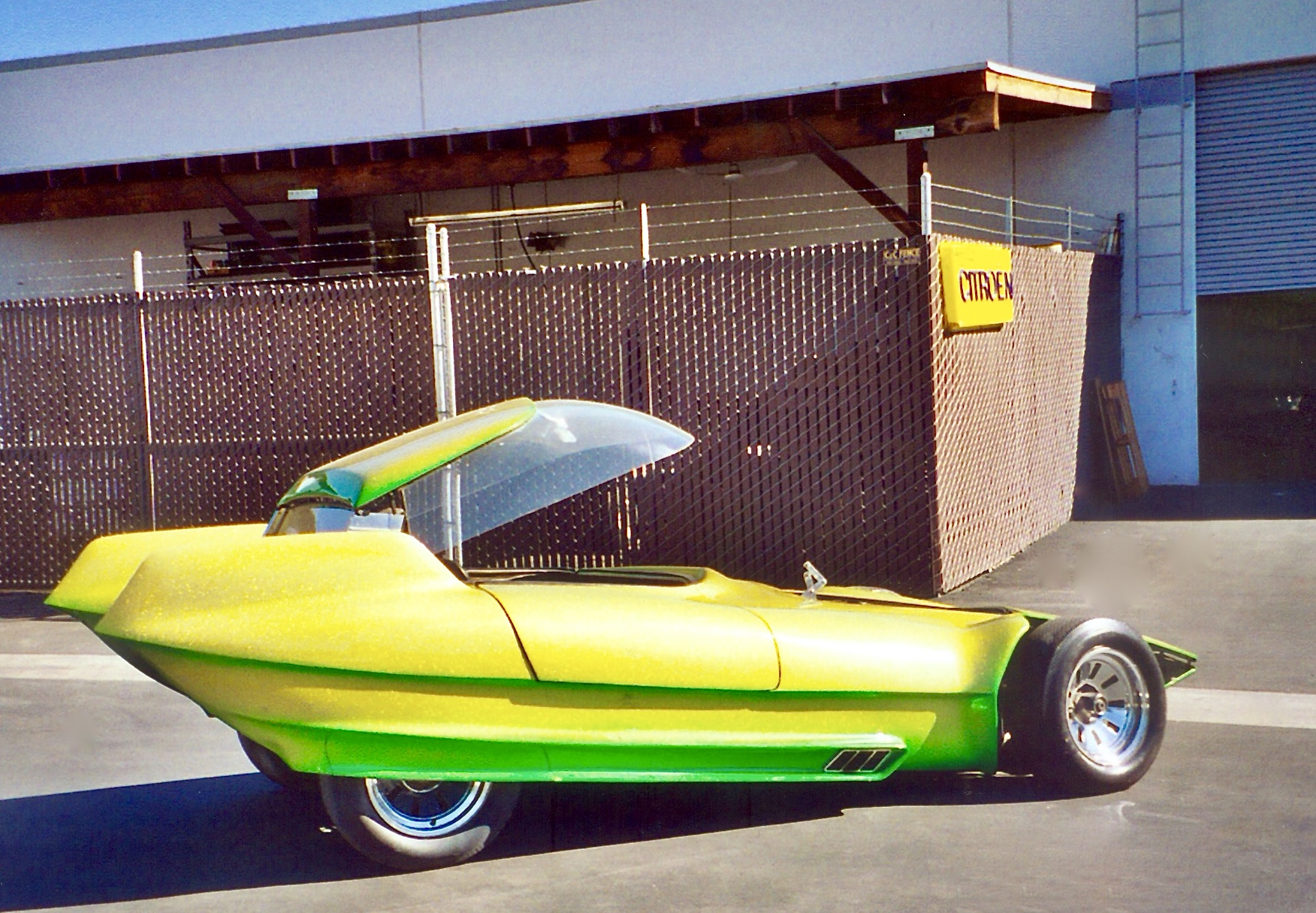
The Reactor (show rod) by Gene Winfield with paint fade style blending from one color to another

=== Paint ===
Custom paint jobs play a large role in the culture around customized cars. Builders will often use special painting techniques to produce unique finishes, including the use of candy paint, metalflake, and color shifting paint. Additionally, builders will often create paint jobs with intricate designs or patterns by pinstriping, painting by hand, airbrushing, taping out patterns on the car and painting inside them, painting over lace, overlaying gold leaf, and more. Some customizers will also opt for vinyl wraps, vinyl decals, or plastidip in place of a traditional paint job. In addition to paint, individual parts of a car may also be chromed, gold plated, or engraved.

Transparent but wildly colored candy-apple paint, applied atop a metallic undercoat, and metalflake paint, with aluminum glitter within candy-apple paint, appeared in the 1960s. These took many coats to produce a brilliant effect – which tended to flake off in hot climates. This process and style of paint job were invented by Joe Bailon, a customizer from Northern California.

Painting has become such a part of the custom car scene that in many custom car competitions, awards for custom paint are as highly sought after as awards for the cars themselves.

=== Engine swaps ===
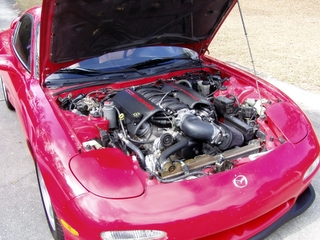
LS1 V8 engine swap in a Mazda RX-7 FD

Engine swaps are a common modification involving taking the engine from one car and putting it into another, often one that did not initially come with that engine. A few of the most common engines swapped into other vehicles include the BMW M54, Chevy small block, Chevy LS, Chrysler Hemi, Cummins B Series, Ford Barra, Ford Coyote, Ford flathead V8, Honda B, Honda K, Mazda 13B, Nissan RB, Nissan SR, Subaru EJ, Toyota JZ, Toyota UZ, Toyota S, and Volkswagen VR6. Completing an engine swap typically requires a high level of modification and fabrication to fit the engine and connect it to the host vehicle's body, transmission, and electrics. Many companies sell kits for common engine swaps that include adapter plates for the transmission, K member, engine mounts, front subframe, and more, depending on what is required for the particular swap. Some engine swaps will use the vehicle's original transmission, while others opt for the transmission from the donor car, or a different transmission entirely.

=== Suspension ===
Custom car builders alter the suspension of their vehicles for a variety of reasons, including lifting them for better ground clearance while off-roading, or lowering them for better handling. Many builders also alter their suspension for aesthetic reasons, including lifting, lowering or fitting aftermarket height adjustable suspension. Lowriders, for instance, are often fitted with hydraulic or air suspension which allows them to be raised and lowered with the push of a button or switch. Some customizers will even install the suspension from another vehicle, such as a solid axle swap (SAS), which replaces independent front suspension (IFS) with a solid axle.

== Awards ==
One of the most coveted awards for American customizers is the AMBR (America's Most Beautiful Roadster) trophy, presented annually at the Grand National Roadster Show since 1948 (also known within the customizer community as the Oakland Roadster Show until it was moved to Southern California in 2003). This competition has produced famous and radical customs.

Another is the Ridler Award, presented at the Detroit Autorama since 1964 in honor of show promoter Don Ridler. This prompts builders of many high-end roadsters to enter Autorama first and then the Grand National show to have the chance to win top honors at both shows. Few cars and owners can claim this achievement.

== Notable customs ==
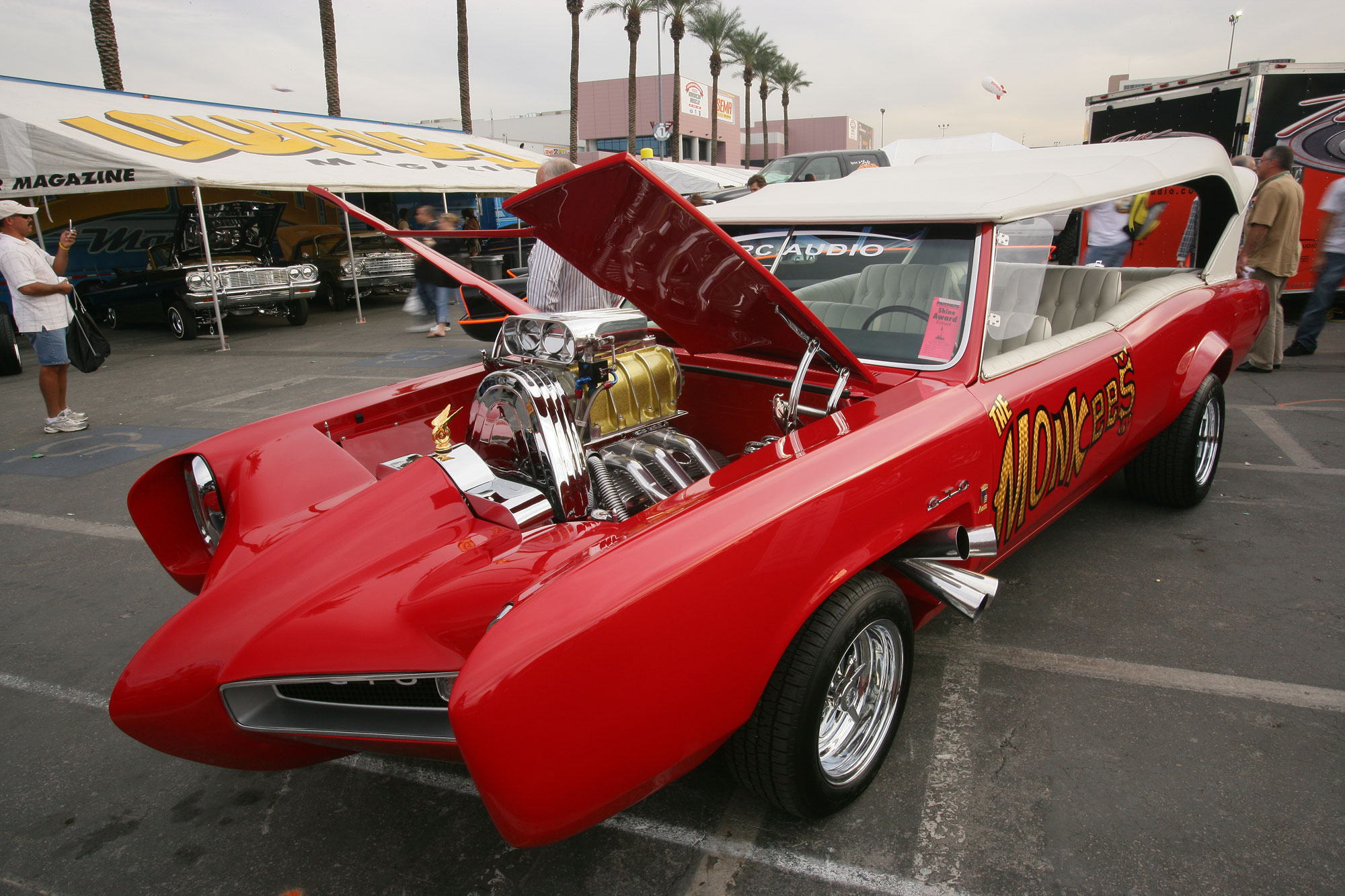
The Monkeemobile from The Monkees

Some customs gained attention for winning awards at shows or for their styling. Some examples include Silhouette and Ed Roth's Mysterion. Some notable custom cars have been turned into Hot Wheels cars or other scale models, such as The Red Baron.

Other custom cars became notable for appearances in film (such as Ala Kart {1958}, The California Kid three-window {1973}, the yellow deuce from "American Graffiti" {1973}, the Batmobiles from Batman, the Pursuit Special from Mad Max, and more) or television (such as The Monkeemobile from the "Monkees", and KITT from Knight Rider).

Other notable customs exemplified a trend. One of these is the 1951 Merc built by the Barris brothers for Bob Hirohata in 1953, known as the Hirohata Merc. Even without an appearance in the film ("Runnin' Wild"), it is one of the most iconic 1950s customs. The same year, Neil Emory and Clayton Jensen of Valley Custom Shop built Polynesian for Jack Stewart, starting with a 1950 Holiday 88 sedan. Polynesian made the cover of Hot Rod in August, and saw 54 pages of construction details in Motor Trend Custom Car Annual in 1954.

== Gallery ==
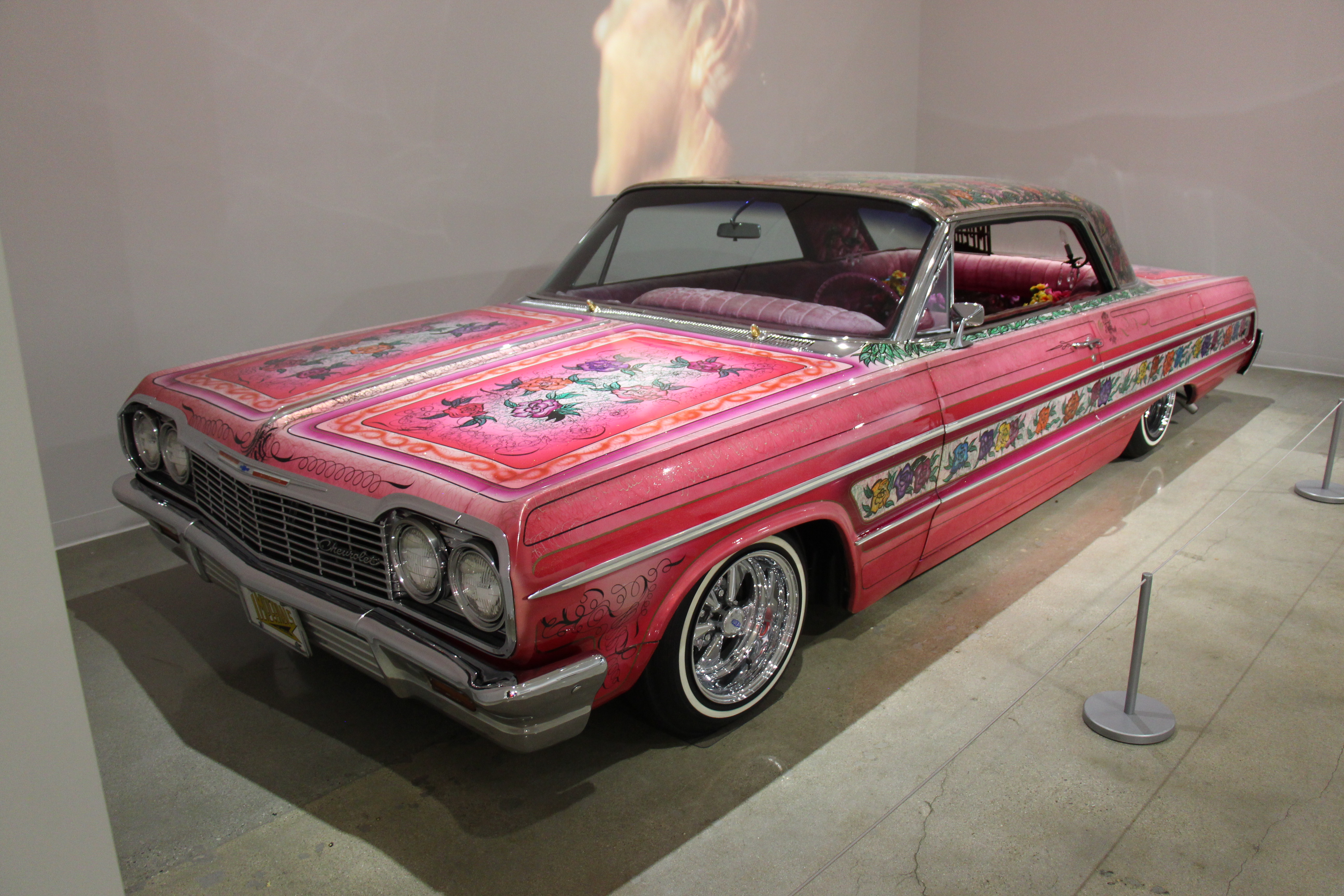
1964 Chevrolet Impala named "Gypsy Rose" on display in the Petersen Automotive Museum, considered to be one of the most iconic lowriders ever built

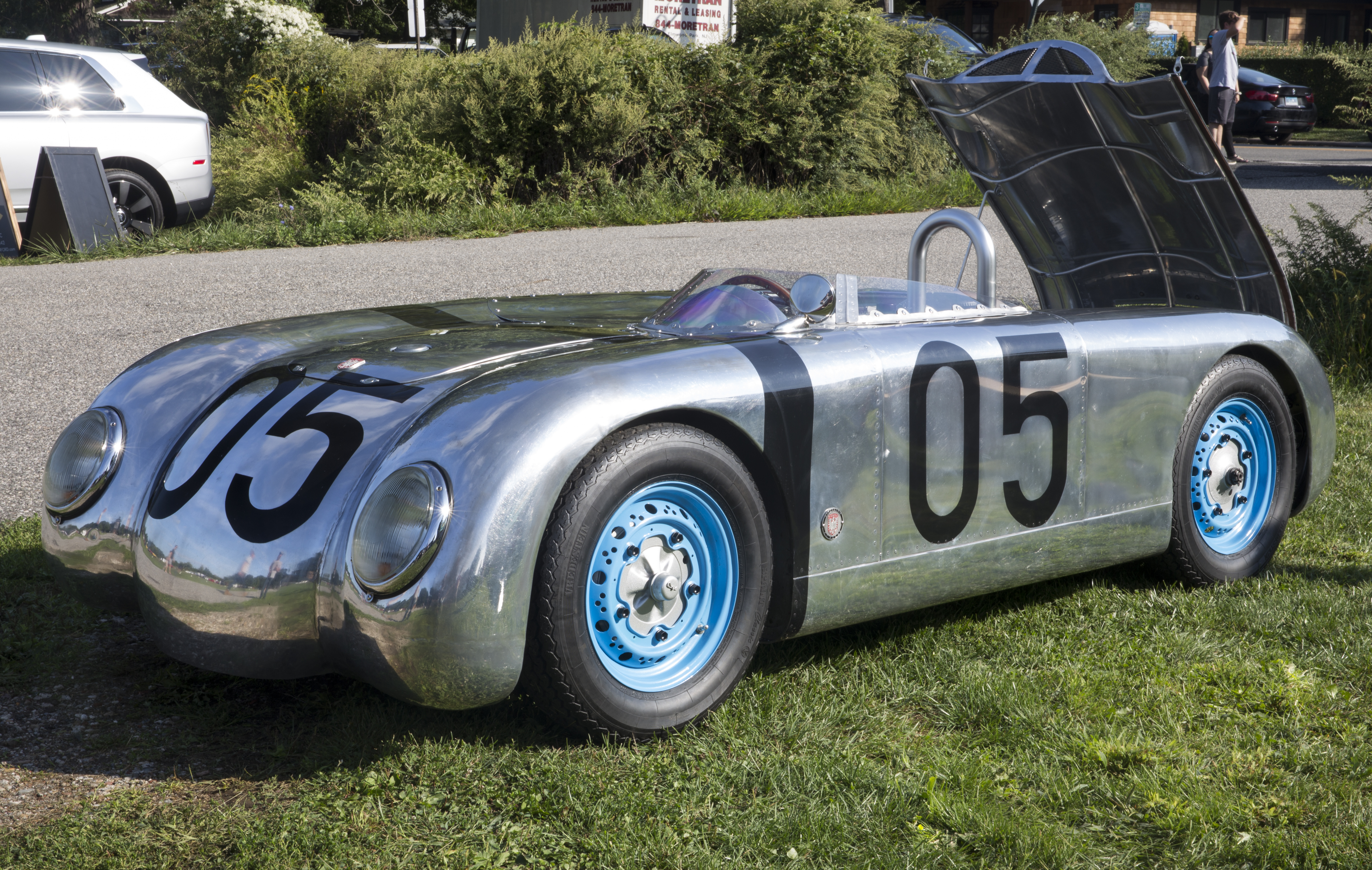
Rünge Flyer with a hand-built aluminum body over a steel tube frame

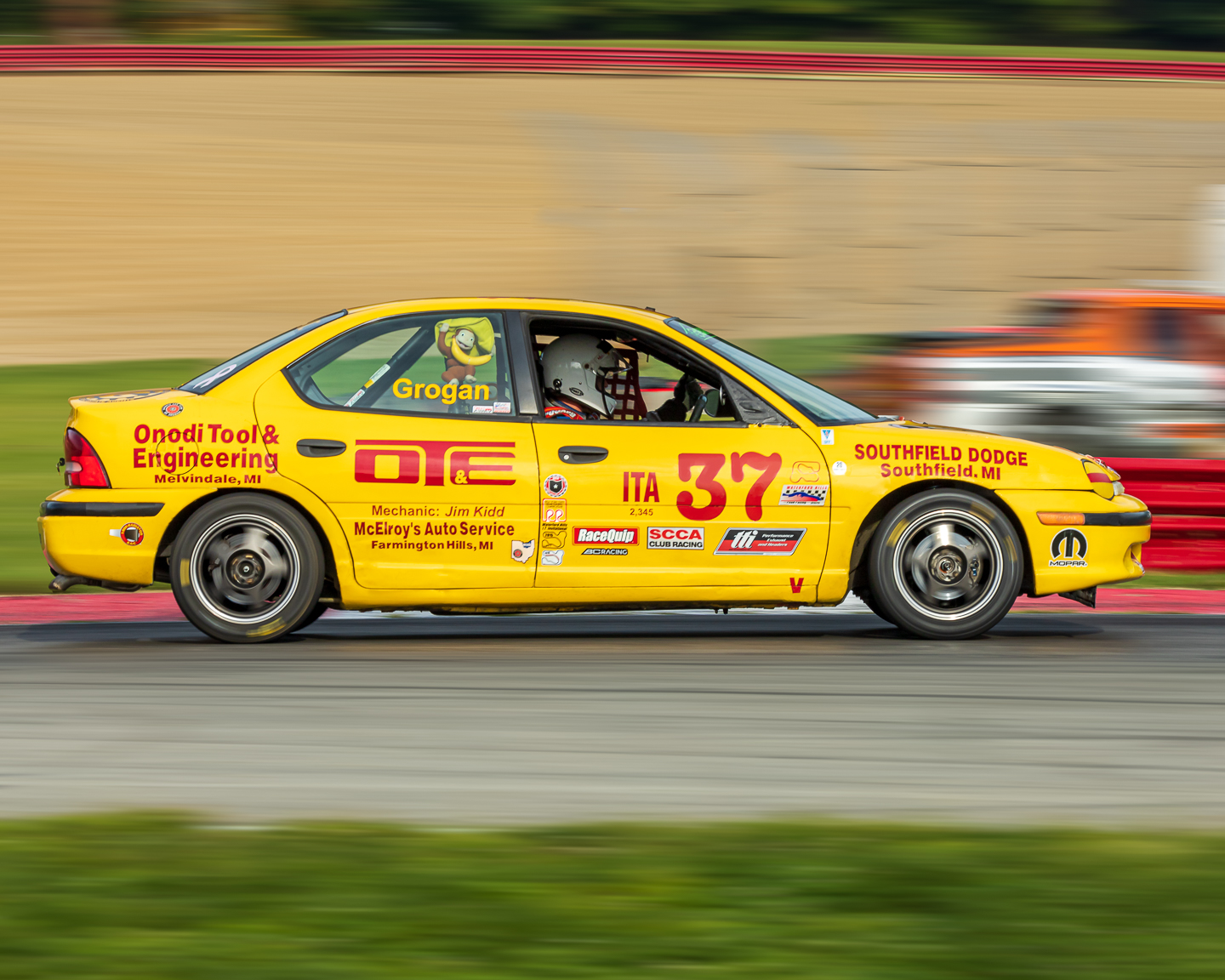
Dodge Neon ACR modified for racing

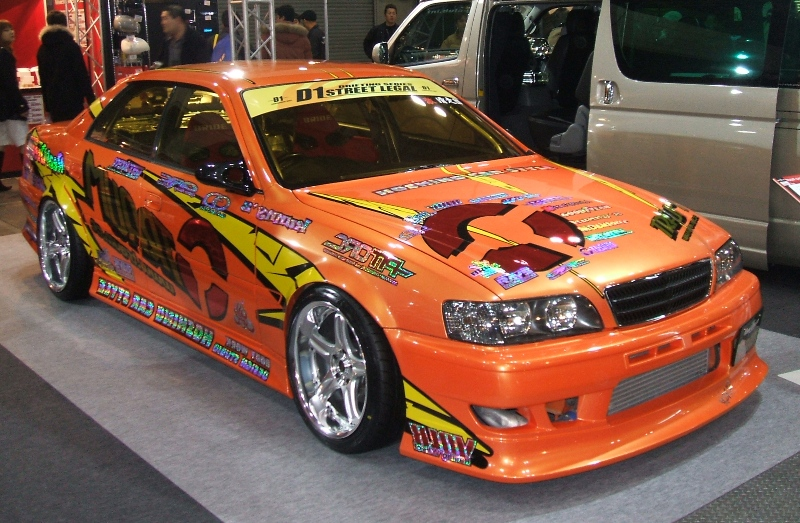
Toyota Chaser modified for drifting

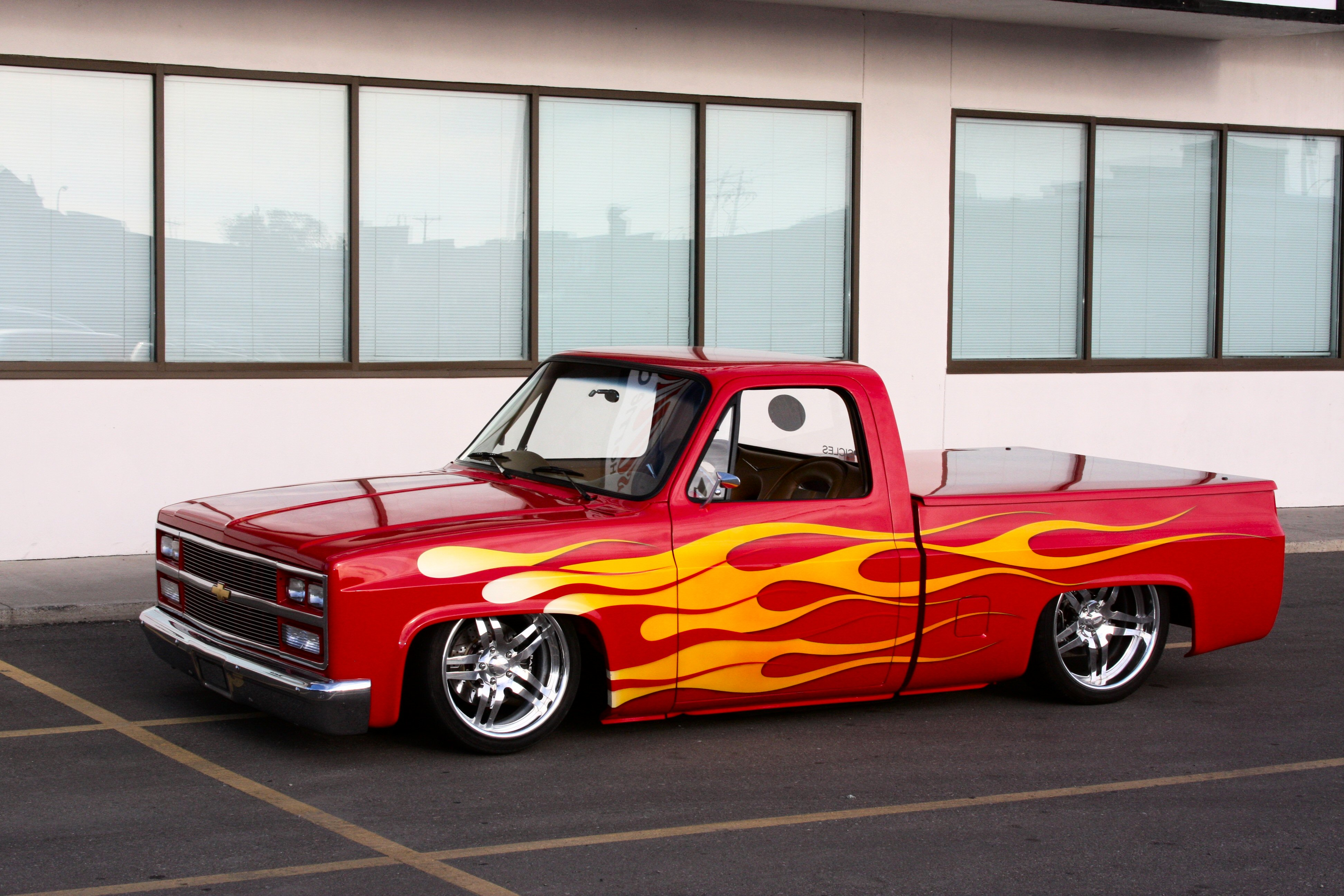
Customized 1985 Chevrolet C10 with a flame paintjob

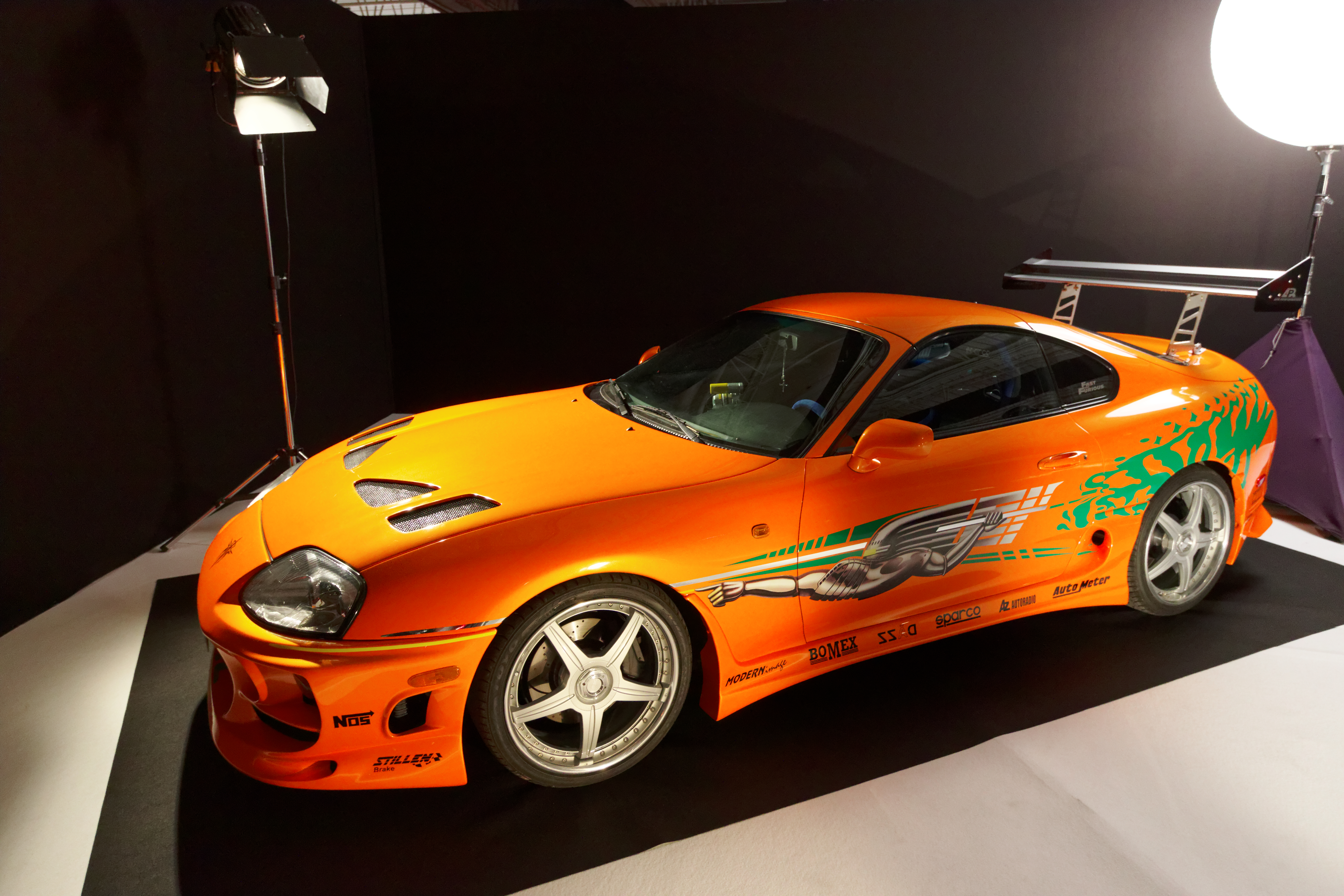
Modified Toyota Supra used in The Fast and the Furious (2001)

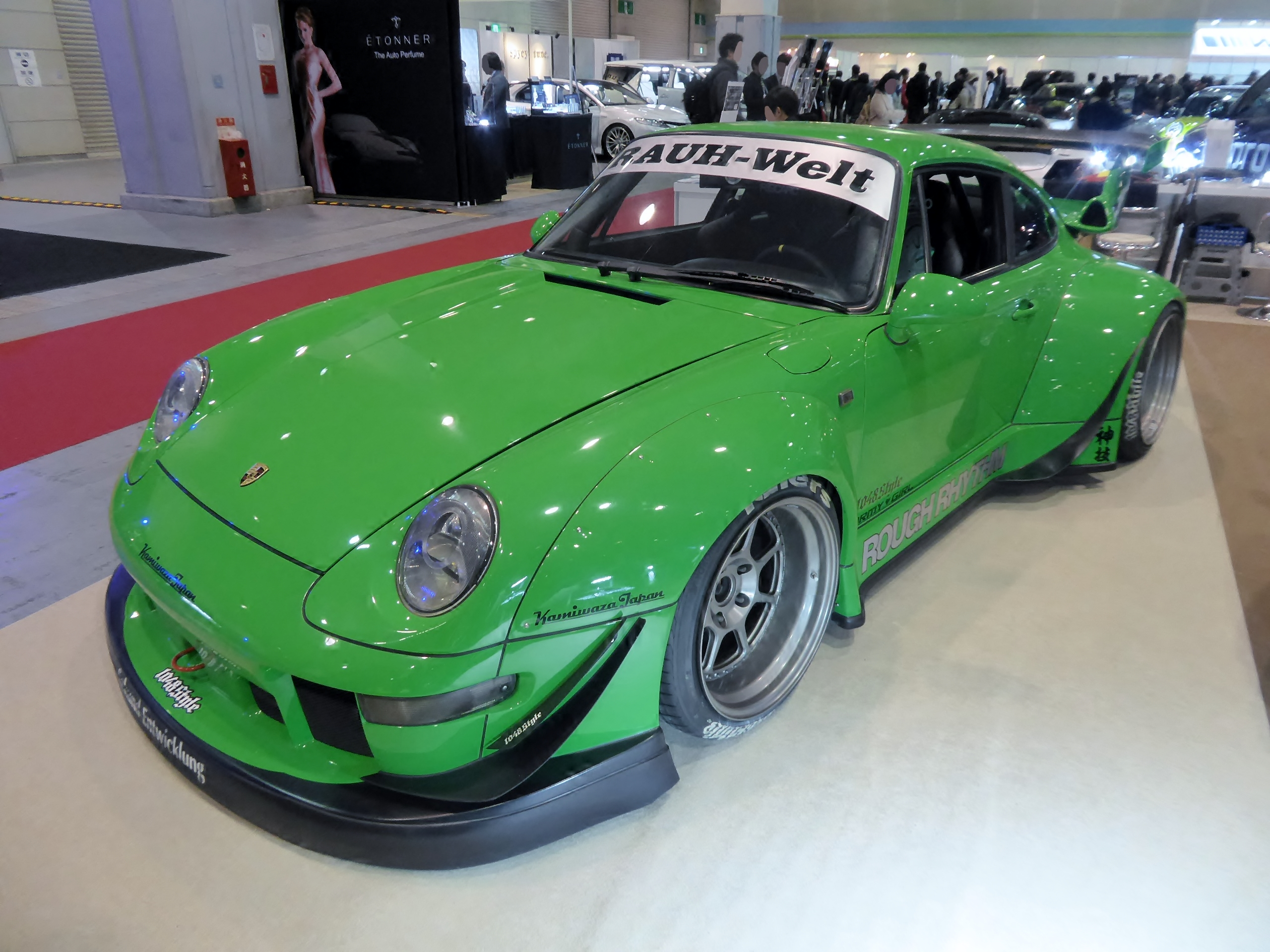
Porsche 993 911 with a RAUH-Welt BEGRIFF widebody kit

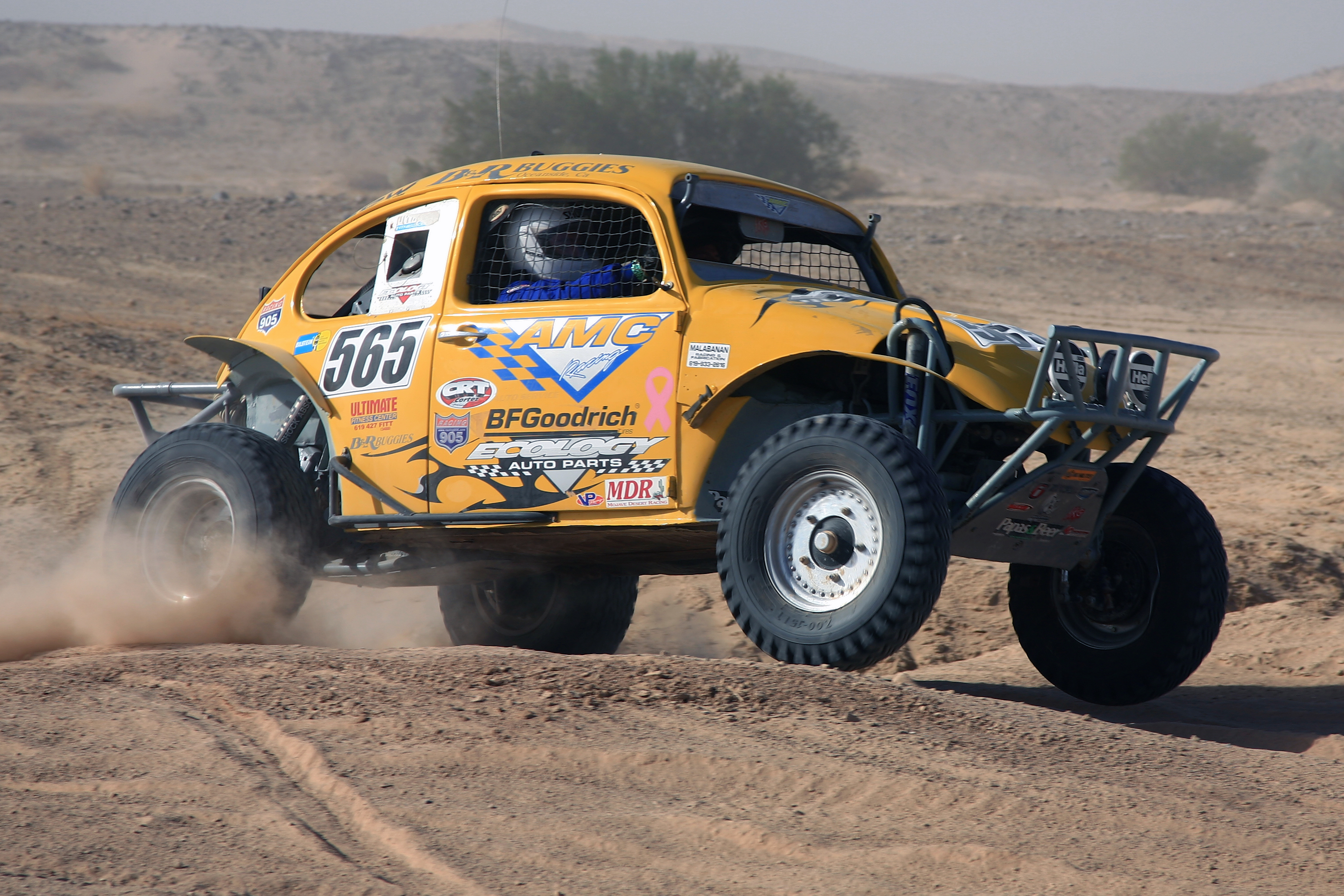
Volkswagen Beetle turned into a Baja Bug for off-road racing

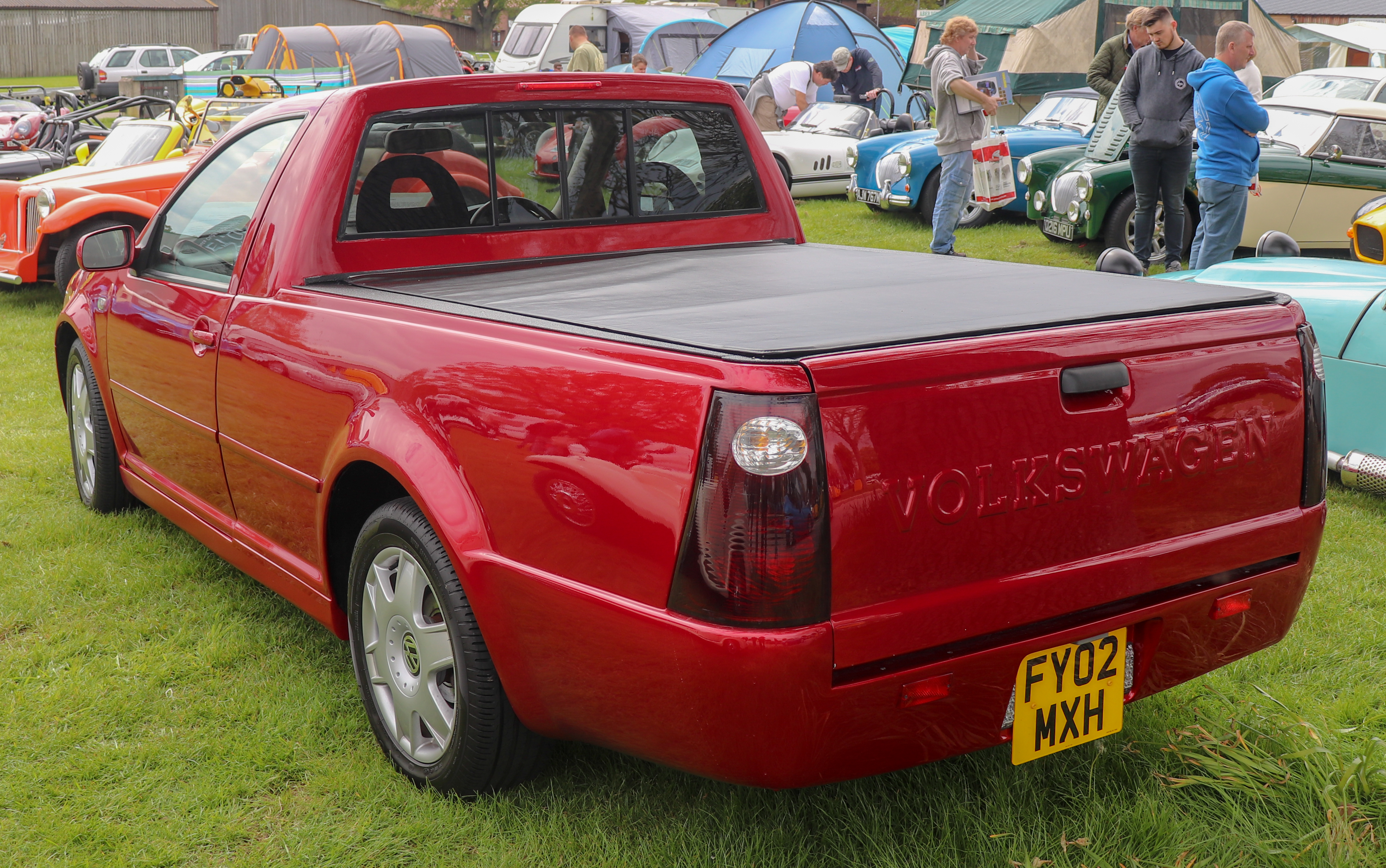
Volkswagen Bora sedan converted into a ute using a custom kit

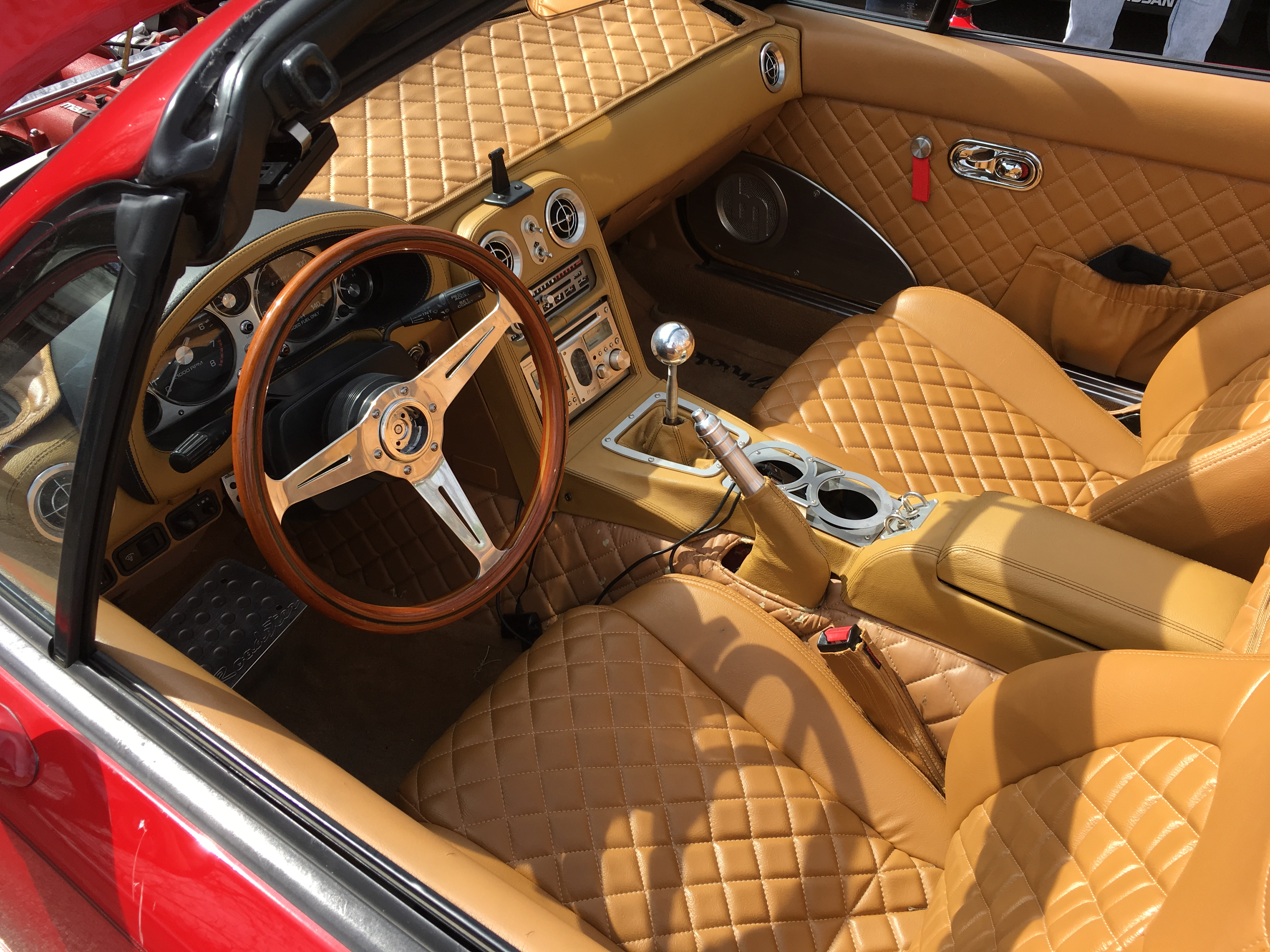
Custom interior in a Mazda Miata

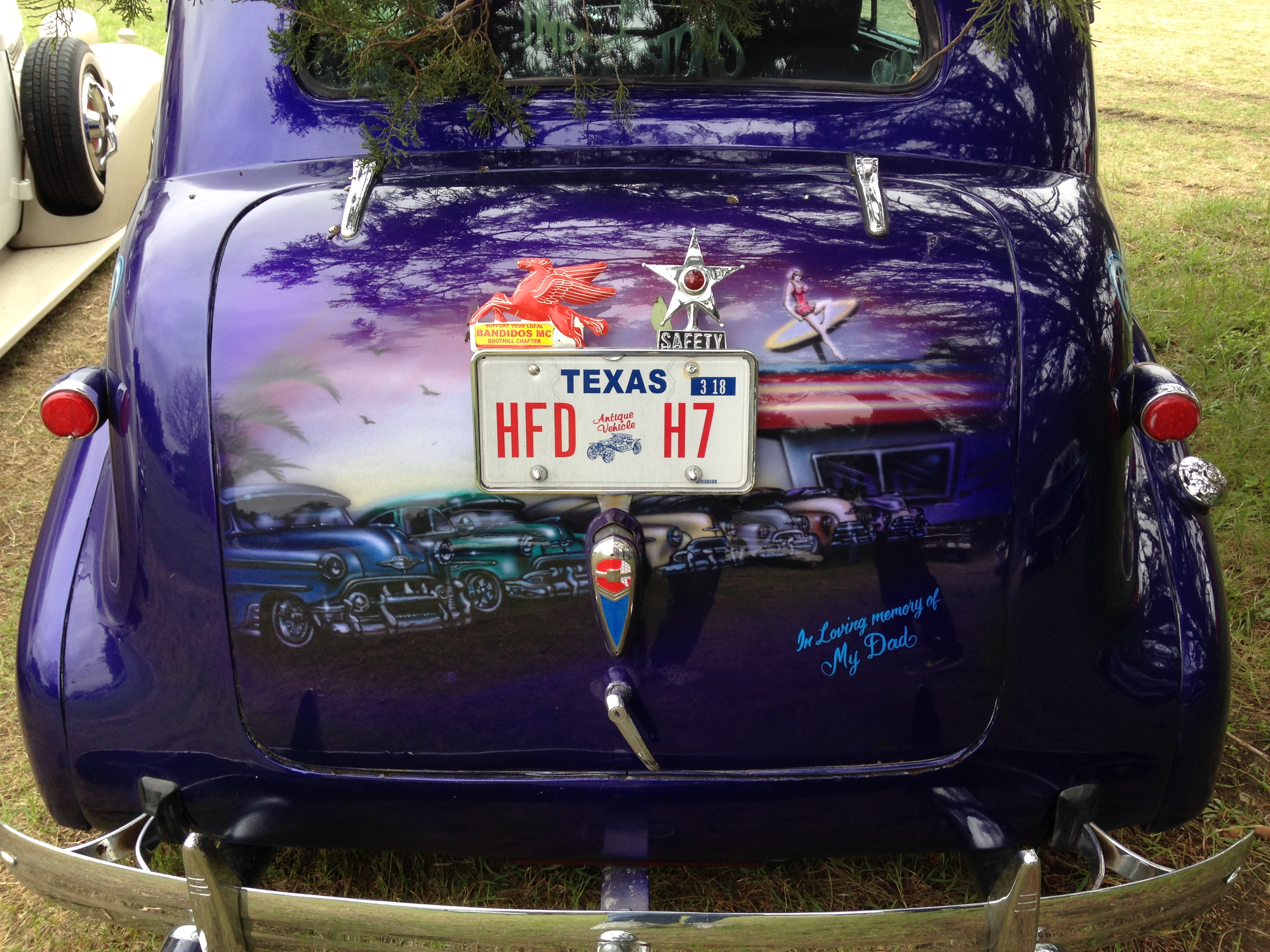
Painted mural on the trunk of a lowrider

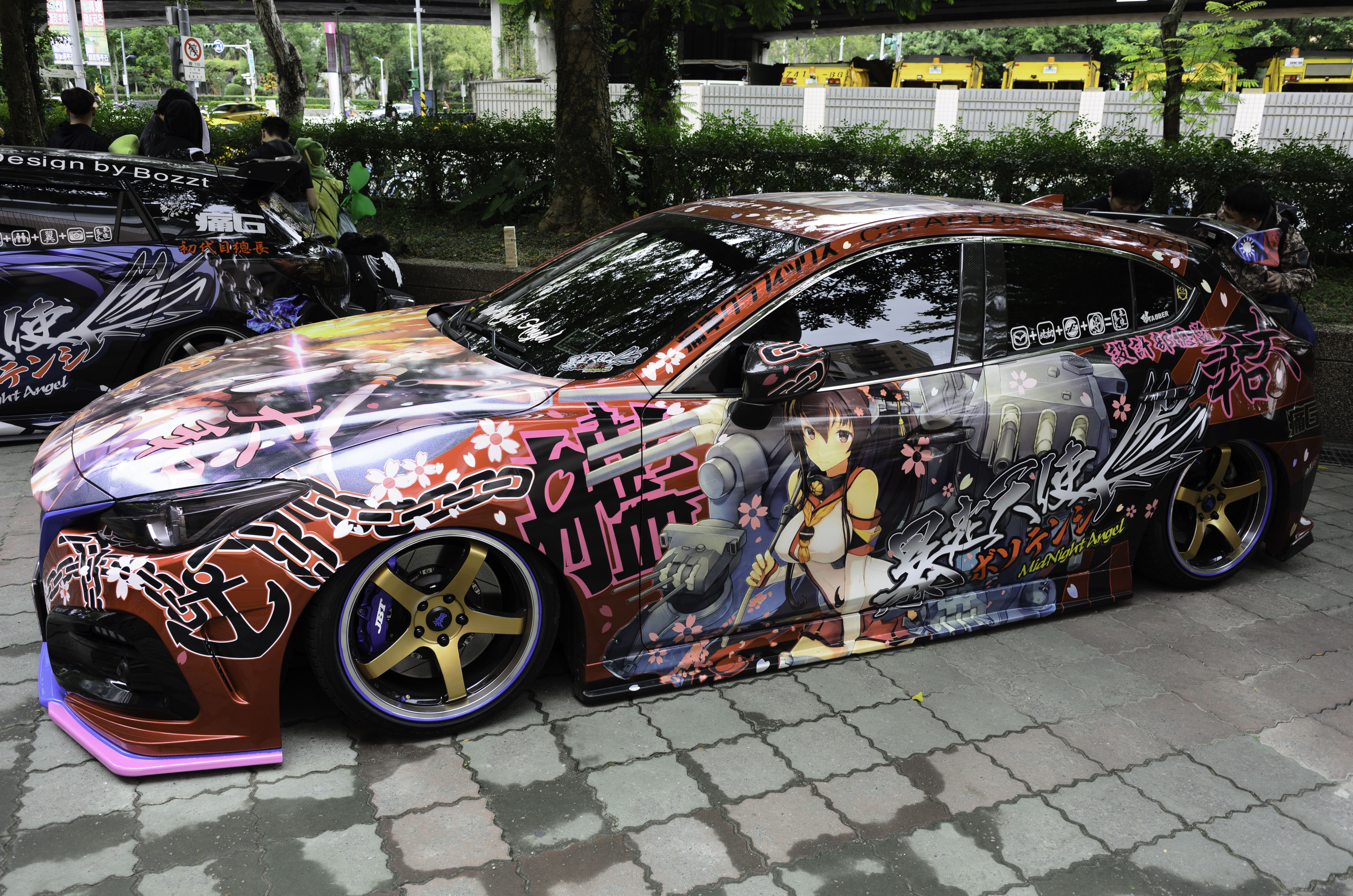
A Mazda 3 with an Itasha style wrap

== See also ==
- Adapted automobile
- Automotive restoration
- Car tuning
- Crate engine
- Custom motorcycle
- Electric vehicle conversion
- Hot hatch
- Hot rod
- Import scene
- Kustom
- Lead sled
- Lowrider
- Pimp My Ride
- Rat rod
- Rice burner
- Sleeper (car)
- Street racing
- Tuner
- Virtual tuning
