= Stance (vehicle) =

Auto term for positioning of a vehicle

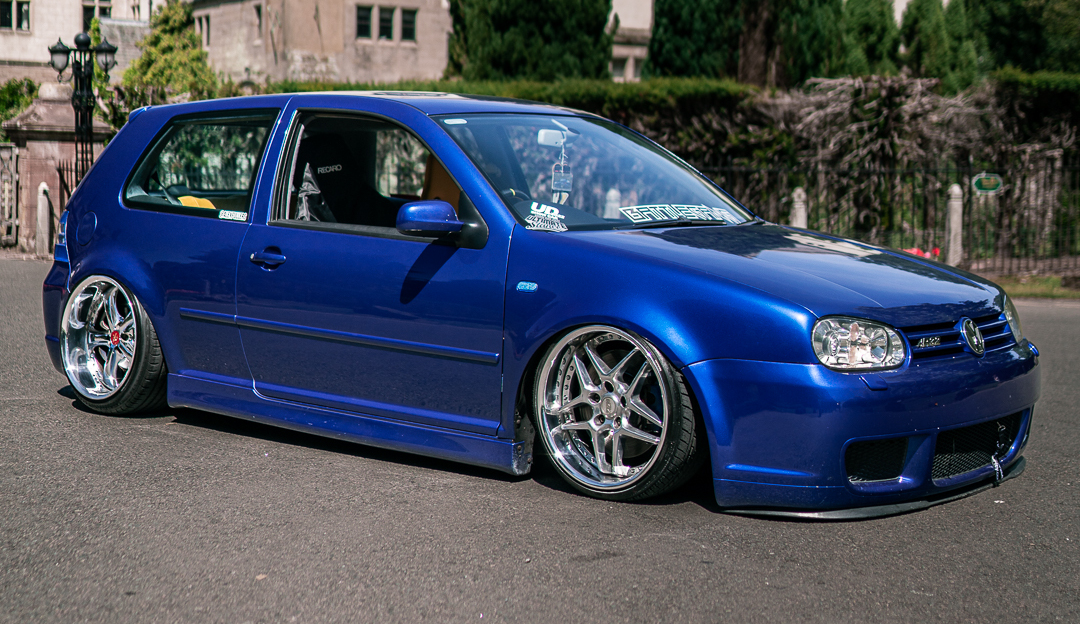
A Volkswagen Golf Mk4 R32 displaying the "stanced" look with aftermarket air suspension and Blitz Type 03 & Work VSKF wheels with negative camber.

The stance of a vehicle is a term that describes a vehicle's suspension height and the fitment of the wheels in the fender arches. It may refer to any vehicle, including sports cars, pickup trucks and off-road vehicles. However, it is mostly associated with lowered sports cars, sedans, hatchbacks, and other body styles of passenger cars. The main parameters of a vehicle's stance are suspension height and position of the wheels. Suspension height usually depends on the suspension components while wheel position usually depends on the rim size and offset. Tire fitment also plays a big role from both a visual and functional perspective. The term stance is commonly associated with the stanced car subculture, a style of modifying cars which emphasizes lowering cars, typically with either coilovers or air suspension, and often adding negative camber to the wheels to achieve the "stanced" look.

== Customization style ==
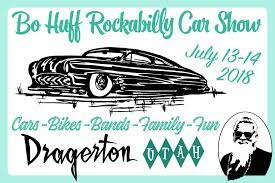
Poster for Bo Huff car show featuring a customized "taildragger" car with a lowered stance

In addition to the term being used to refer to the way a car sits as a result of its suspension and wheel setup, "stance", and "stanced", are also often used to describe a distinct car customization style. Key elements of the stance style are: lowered suspension (lowering springs, coilovers or air suspension), stretched tires and negative camber. Oftentimes, the main purpose of a stanced car project is to achieve an improved visual appeal rather than improved performance characteristics or handling, however some cars combine both. Many of these extremely lowered cars tend to be show cars and typically do not play the role of daily driver or race car. Extreme body work, suspension and wheel setups often make them less comfortable to drive on public roads and sometimes unsafe. Stance is related to other modification styles such as Euro style and VIP style.

== Negative camber ==
An illustration of a wheel with negative camber.

Camber is a measurement from the centerline of the wheel/tire relative to the road's surface. Negative camber is when the top of the wheel/tire angles inward toward the center of the vehicle. When done sparingly, negative camber greatly improves the handling characteristics of a vehicle. It does this by keeping the center of the tire perpendicular to the road when the car is turning. Therefore, allowing the optimum amount of tire tread to contact the road.

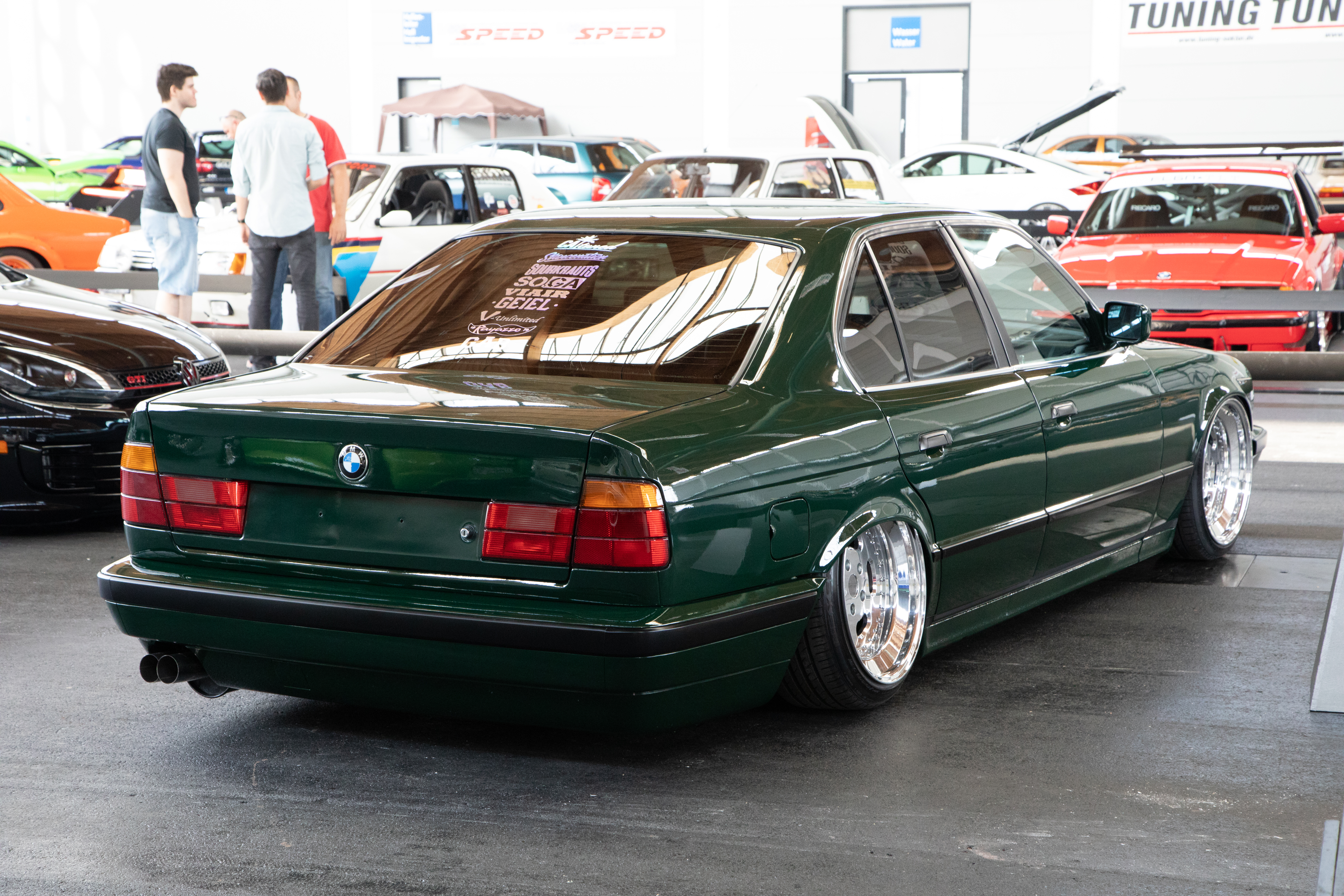
Stanced BMW 5 Series (E34)

Conversely, negative camber will decrease tire grip in straight line acceleration and braking. This is due to the same reasoning: when the vehicle is not turning, less tread will be in contact with the road or track, resulting in less grip and lost performance. Many drift cars, however, use negative camber on their front wheels for better handling characteristics as the negative camber keeps the contact patch of the tire perpendicular to the road when going through turns with much steering angle.

While most normal vehicles maintain about 0.5° - 1° of camber, in the stance community, some owners run up to 45° of negative camber to achieve the stance they are looking for.

== Origin ==
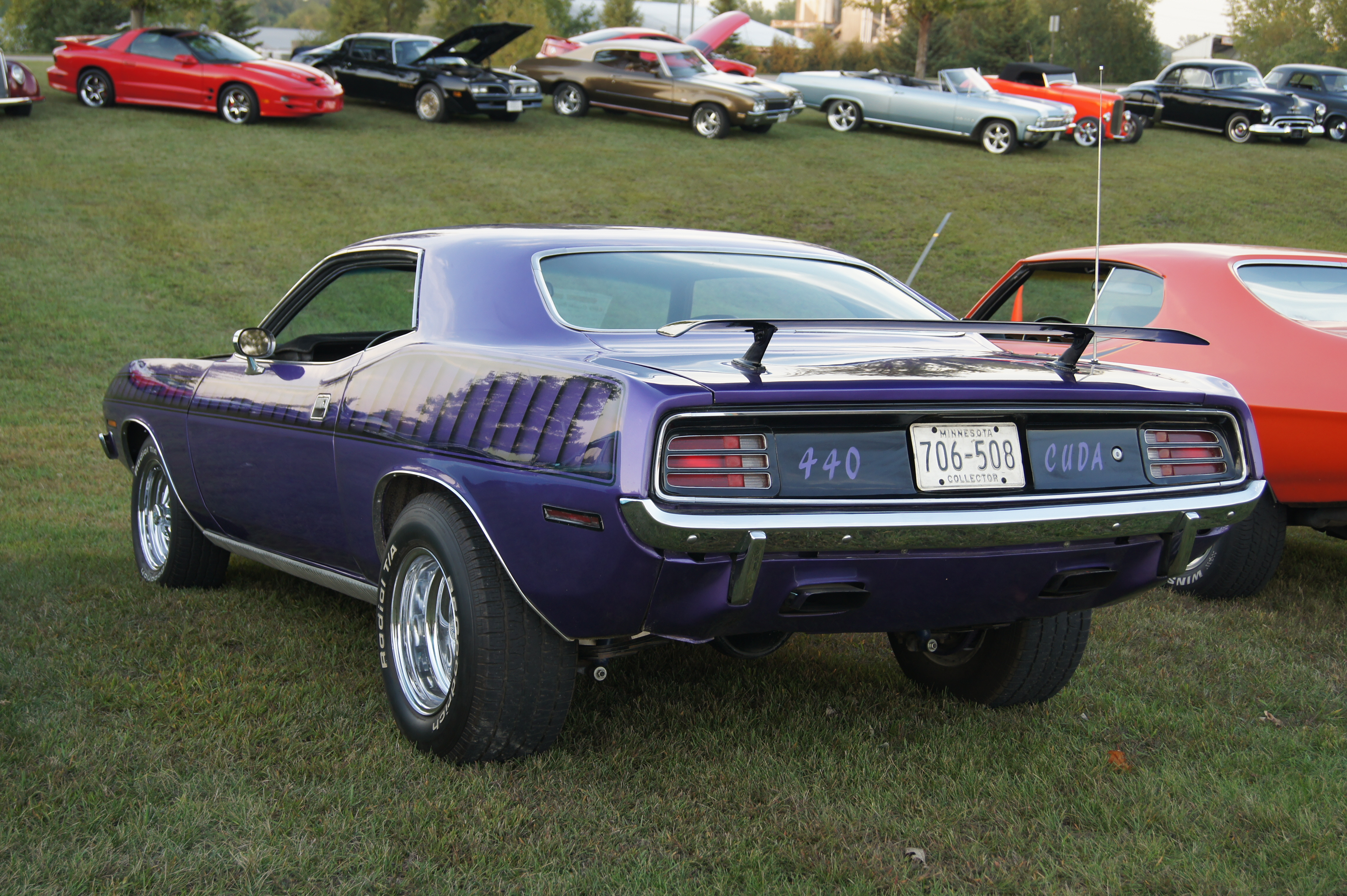
Plymouth Barracuda with a staggered wheel setup and a "raked" stance where the rear sits higher than the front

Usage of the term "stance" to refer to a car's suspension and wheel setup dates back to at least the 1970s. As for the customization style, some sources credit the origin of the "stance" style to motorsport, stating that enthusiasts started seeking to modify their cars to replicate the low to the ground look of race cars, as typically, most racecars designed for race tracks feature low and stiff suspension along with light and wide sport wheels for better handling and cornering on the race tracks. Others credit earlier styles of car customization as inspiring the modern "stance" style, with the idea of lowering your car for aesthetic reasons dating back to the early days of custom car culture. For instance, a popular style of lowered custom car that first emerged in the 1940s was the taildragger car, described by Motor Trend as follows:

The Ford's stance was reworked by Brothers Custom to bring the rear lower to the ground, capturing the era when rear tires barely peeked out from the bottoms of the skirts... With the frame and the wishbones C'd, the trunk floor and torque tube tunnel raised, and the rear crossmember flattened, Brothers Custom really set the taildragger style.

The origin of many key elements of modern "stance" style is often credited to Japan, and styles such as VIP style which emerged there. However, other countries have also previously had similar subcultures of car modification that developed largely independent of Japan, and as such, the true origins of the style are hard to pinpoint.

== Culture and events ==
Stance centric car shows are hosted around the world on most continents. Events happen yearly that host many stanced cars, such as Stancenation, Wörthersee Treffen, FittedUK, Wekfest, Ultrace and H2Oi. There is also a significant stanced car presence at larger events such as SEMA, Tokyo Auto Salon and Osaka Auto Messe.
