= Kill Switch...Klick =

American rock band

- Kill Switch...Klick promo shot, 1993 (from left to right, D.A. Sebasstian, Victoria Knight, Mike Ditmore)

Background information
- Origin: Seattle, Washington, US
- Genres: Industrial rock
- Years active: 1991–present
- Labels: Urge Ltd, Cleopatra, Irregular, Go-Kustom Rekords
- Members: D.A. Sebasstian
- Past members: Avette Avery; Victoria Knight; Matt Cekosh; Paul Wynia; Mike Ditmore; Jeremy Moss; Super Amanda
- Website: Official KsK Homepage

Taken from the Follow Me video. Circa 1992

KsK Circa 1994

KsK Circa 1997

Kill Switch...Klick, also known as KsK and Kill Switch (the original) is the name of an American industrial rock band. The band is best known for its releases on Cleopatra Records and Go-Kustom Rekords. KsK was formed in 1991 by D.A. Sebasstian (born Devin Edward Chastain on February 27, 1964), a writer, film maker, musician and artist who had relocated from San Bernardino, California, to Seattle, Washington, late in 1989 where he currently resides.

== History ==
=== Previous projects (1981–1991) ===
Sebasstian had been in numerous bands in San Bernardino starting in 1981 as bassist and lyricist for the hardcore punk band Xijix. This band played party and small club shows around the area, but broke up one year later when their guitarist joined the Marine Corps. In 1983 Sebasstian joined Latin avant-garde band Freaks Amor as trombonist, bassist and keyboard synthesist. Said Sebasstian, "That was way before MIDI synths and home computers had been invented or popularized. We literally had to mark each sound setting on the synth with grease pencils, then twist knobs like crazy in-between songs to get the right sounds." Freaks gigged regularly in Los Angeles and San Bernardino, playing alongside contemporaries Kommunity FK and the Suburban Lawns. Sebasstian left Freaks Amor shortly after their first self-titled E.P. was released to join Montage as lyricist and singer. This U2-, The Alarm- and Simple Minds-influenced band headlined some of the biggest clubs in L.A. at the time, including Gazzarri's, Madam Wong's East and Club Lingerie. In 1984 Montage released a four-song vinyl E.P. entitled Celebrate The Misery. Shortly thereafter Sebasstian left to form his own electronic music project Aside/Beside. This project released several cassette albums but only played one show. Frustrated and strung out from drug and alcohol abuse Sebasstian left San Bernardino and moved to Waldorf, Maryland, Atlanta, and eventually Seattle. Early in 1991, Sebasstian got sober and began seriously writing music again and contemplating forming a new band.

=== Sobriety and inspiration (1991–1993) ===
Sebasstian came up with the band name while working at Microsoft as a landscape grunt. As the story goes, the mower he was using started to sputter and cough- so he thought aloud "Better hit the Kill Switch." Says Sebasstian:

As I reached down to shut the mower off, it was as if a light went off in my head. I had been looking for a band name for months and nothing seemed to fit the aggressive electronic direction my music was taking. The words "Kill Switch" kept rolling around in my head all afternoon. This was at the same time Jeffrey Dahmer was all over the news for his cannibalistic antics. A random thought of Dahmer with a switch on the side of his head marked "Kill" came to me. I thought what if Dahmer had a Kill Switch that went "Klick" and he instantly changed into the strange creature he eventually became. Klick was an after thought, so I have always written the name with the ellipses.

The band name subsequently inspired novelist William Gibson to entitle his first X-files episode Kill Switch after a chance meeting with Sebasstian during a book tour. Later when Kill Switch aired it inspired the naming of the metalcore band Killswitch Engage. Sebasstian used the acronym KsK for Kill Switch...Klick with a lower case "s", paying homage to PiL, one of his biggest musical influences.

Kill Switch...Klick's sound was very different at that time from a Seattle music scene steeped in the then current grunge sound. Sebasstian's main musical influences were from late 1970s and early 1980s bands like Killing Joke, Public Image Ltd., Cabaret Voltaire and SPK. Sebasstian produced a Kill Switch...Klick demo tape recorded solo in his studio apartment on a four track tape deck. The cassette demo received airplay on Seattle's newly reformatted KNDD 107.7-FM. The End, as KNDD was now called, embraced local artists like college radio stations of the day. The End, as well as the University Of Washington's radio station KCMU, would both play key roles in Kill Switch...Klick becoming one of the Northwest's best known electronica acts.

Encouraged by the attention and airplay of the KsK demo recording, Sebasstian began the task of putting together a live band to bring these recordings onto the stages of Seattle. He found drummer Mike Ditmore from an ad in The Rocket, a once popular Seattle musicians resource and classified monthly. They were soon joined by Avette Avery on keyboards and backing vocals. Their first show was an art gallery opening at the Art/Not Terminal. As luck would have it, The Seattle Times was at the event doing a feature article on the gallery and thus the band's very first gig garnished them a bit of local publicity. The band decided rather than re-recording their demo they would concentrate on making a music video. Enlisting the help of Ditmore's long time friend, director Sylvia Szabo, KsK made their first music video for the song "Follow Me". Shot entirely on location in 16 mm black & white film, this highly controversial and artistic video made the rounds on the international gothic-industrial club circuits and was even banned for commercial airplay in Canada due to its "adult graphic content." Soon after the videos release, Avery left the band. The core of Kill Switch...Klick remained Sebasstian and Ditmore for nearly five years after.

The next year Sebasstian got a phone call from Chris Massey and Robert Riscassi of the Seattle grindcore band And Christ Wept. They were looking for other like-minded bands to play area shows with. Riscassi mentioned another Seattle band who might be interested in gigging called Noise Box. Sebasstian immediately called 'Dre of said band and after a few minutes on the phone they all decided to have a meeting at the Puss Puss Cafe in the Capitol Hill area of Seattle. This meeting became the foundation for the N.E.C. or Northwest Elektro-Industrial Coalition. Over 30 musicians showed up in 10 different projects. These included Kill Switch...Klick, Noise Box, And Christ Wept, SMP, Terminal, The Same, Sex WIth Sarah and many others. The purpose of the N.E.C. and its monthly meetings was to help promote electronic music in the Northwest by giving similar influenced artists a network of bands to play shows with. This was right in the middle of the Grunge explosion and electronic music was still not very popular in the Seattle area. The N.E.C. was a huge success with national articles written in Keyboard Magazine, Industrialnation and Axcess magazines as well as regular club showcases of N.E.C. bands at well-known clubs like The Weathered Wall and Coulorbox. The N.E.C. also released compilation tapes of its members and put out a monthly newsletter. By sharing mailing lists the N.E.C. bands quickly made a network of area electronic music enthusiasts. Many of the founding bands and artists were later signed to national record deals.

=== Formation and deGenerate (1993–1998) ===
KsK originally signed with Urge Ltd in 1993, a label founded by Russell Ziecker (former bandmate of Charlie Sexton and before starting Urge working at Virgin Records Publishing). This relationship did not produce anything more than demo tapes and a rumored track "Big Dub" in the movie Headless Body Topless Bar. The duo then signed to Cleopatra Records in 1994. The following year the band released the album Beat it to Fit, Paint it to Match, a compilation of demos and remixes titled Oddities & Versions, and went on their first US tour with bassist Paul Wynia. The tour was entitled "Muzak for the Masses", and also included grindcore artists And Christ Wept. This tour was a success for the band and added to their growing fan base. When Sebasstian returned from tour he released his first solo CD on his own imprint INDVSTA MVSIC. The disc was entitled One Minute Endless and showcased a more classical and experimental side to Sebasstians song writing. Each disc was signed and numbered and encased in pieces of orange plastic fence material held together with electrical zip ties. The title track was a twenty-minute ambient piece that used vague movie samples and textures washed together in a stream of reverbs and delays. Said Jester in Sonic Boom Magazine, "This album is the solo work of Sebasstian the lead vocalist from Kill Switch... Klick. The CD itself arrives in a nifty package consisting of two pieces of orange barrier fence twist tied together and the CD itself is individually signed, hand numbered and inserted into a liner sleeve. The music is quite unlike anything that D.A. has written for KsK and borders more on classical piano in some places rather than the traditional grinding electronic industrial that you might expect. Overall the music is much mellower, more emotional and deeply personal compared to other material Sebasstian has been responsible for writing. D.A. utilizes an inordinately large amount of keyboard work on this album. The keyboards ranges from classical piano to other classical keyboard instruments as well as various wacky samples." In 1996 the KsK began work on its second music video for the single "Produkt (Mass Market Mix)". They hired director Brent Watanabe to animate and direct this lo-fi animated homage to "consumerist corporate America". Sebasstian had worked with Watanabe on several short film project previously as both actor and sound designer. In 1997 Kill Switch...Klick added former Transilvia bassist Jeremy Moss, releasing the highly acclaimed album deGenerate released on Cleopatra. Said The Stranger, "deGenerate is not a great album in a local or industrial sense. It's a great album period!" Later that year, and right before their second US tour, Ditmore quit the band to pursue a career with American aviation giant Boeing. KsK's 1997 tour was financially devastating to Sebasstian, when their tour van blew up just before their very first gig in San Francisco. Determined to finish the tour across the United States, Sebasstian borrowed additional money from Cleopatra Records, with the promise of a quick "no recording cost" release when the band returned from tour. This album was ALT. a b-sides and alternative versions CD that actually garnished decent reviews and in fact paid back the borrowed tour money to Cleopatra Records.

=== Organica (1998–2001) ===
In 1998 Sebasstian formed Irregular Records (later Go-Kustom Rekords) and in 1999 released Kill Switch...Klick's most controversial album, Organica. This album featured new songs and re-recorded versions of KsK classics using only acoustic sound sources. Said CMJ Magazine in Issue 67 "D.A. Sebasstian has taken to using only acoustic instruments, recorded in his studio and sampler- processed appropriately, to write new songs and recreate older KsK material. The convention-busting instrumentation makes Organica a surprisingly flirtatious, personality-driven album. Just listen to "5 Hotwheels In My Box," which rhythmically alters a sample of a child blurting "five" and juxtaposes the soundbite with the bleating of bagpipes. Organica is a testament to the ingenuity of Sebasstian as well as to the viability of acoustic instruments in making great dance records." Organica was later licensed and reissued by Invisible Records.

=== Milkin' It For All It's Worth (2001–2005) ===
In 2001 Kill Switch...Klick came out with a "Best Of" collection called "Milkin' It For All It's Worth" on Cleopatra Records, which included remixes by Spahn Ranch and Sigue Sigue Sputnik. The next year Invisible Records released Almost Ambient Collection Volume One. Said Keyboard Magazine, "The accent in the title is on "almost." Though much of the music is warm and gauzy, there's generally a beat prowling around. The sound effects, while subdued, are sometimes disturbing- love the squidgy filter stuff. The cluster-chord piano solo in "Feeding the Machine (Day to Day)" is downright rude, and "A/B Continuity (Resurgence)" is a full-on industrial/techno song. For my money, mastermind D.A. Sebasstian finds a good balance between energetic and mellow. Eleven of the tracks are previously unreleased, eight are reissues."

Sebasstian also began releasing and producing music and remixes for other bands, including DragStrip Riot, The Wages of Sin, Faith & Disease, The Bad Things, Melene Marie Brown, OmBili Troupe, The Flathand 5, Billy Dwayne & The Creepers, Gary Numan, Gene Loves Jezebel, and his own solo project D.A. Sebasstian & The Inner Demons. He also expanded his Go-Kustom Records into the realm of public-access television cable TV with a popular weekly Seattle-based show called Go-Kustom TV with Hostess Lindsay Calkins. GKTV ran for four seasons and has recently been issued as a DVD series and on internet video sites like Blip.tv and YouTube. The show features interviews with Northwest Hot Rod builders, Pin-Up Models, Artists & Musicians.

In 2003 Sebasstian began filming Hot Rod Girls Save the World, a Black & White B-movie style independent film, which includes original soundtrack music by Kill Switch...Klick, as well as many other Seattle area musicians. Filming was completed in 2006. The film went into post-production that same year, and is set for tentative a 2008 release.

Sebasstian started writing feature articles for the national kustom kulture publications- CK Deluxe and Ol' Skool Rodz Magazine in 2004.

=== Mechanoid Collections (2005–2008) ===
In 2006 Go-Kustom Rekords began reissuing the Kill Switch...Klick back catalog including ALT., deGenerate and Almost Ambient Collection Volume One as well as the edgy collection Mechanoid Collection. Says Sebasstian about Mechanoid Collection, "Most of the disc is older material repackaged yet again- but released more for strategic reasons than anything else. I wanted to get some of my favorite songs on a single collection on my own label and quickly up on iTunes. Mechanoid was the vehicle to do this."

Sebasstian teamed up with YouTube starlet Super Amanda in late 2007 to record "Killing Machine," a song featured prominently in Hot Rod Girls Save The World. "Killing Machine" includes five different versions of the title song, in styles ranging from straight ahead rock, electro-industrial and acoustic. Sebasstian also published the Hot Rod Girls Save The World Screenplay with the announced intention of making it into a full blown three part novel series called The Anywhere Trilogy (with Hot Rod Girls Save The World being Book Number Two). Part One of the series is entitled The Legend Of D.B. Petty and is a prequel to the Hot Rod Girls Save The World story line.

In 2008 KsK released Sterile, It & All (seven disc box set), Ugly.Noises, Nominal, The Killing Machine E.P. (with Super Amanda) and The Hemi Charger E.P. (also with Super Amanda on vocals) as well as recording the original movie soundtrack for Hot Rod Girls Save The World. Sebasstian also released the third D.A. Sebasstian & The Inner Demons disc entitled "House Party" (with Super Amanda on backing vocals). Sebasstian's film Hot Rod Girls Save The World was completed on October 31, 2008, with its first private screening held November 15, 2008, to a sold-out audience at the 911 Media Arts Center in Seattle, WA.

=== Hot Rod Girls Save The World (2008–present) ===
Hot Rod Girls Save the World came out on DVD November 2008, and the original movie soundtrack (on Go-Kustom Rekords) was available early 2009. Said Sebasstian, "The hardest part of creating an original score for Hot Rod Girls Save the World was musically creating a collision between old rockabilly styles representative of the townsfolk of Anywhere, Washington and the high tech soundscapes for the aliens from the planet Moosha Maa. I came up with several recurring themes that were woven between the two musical genres and then culminate in the end theme for the film. The idea is the old meets the new, both visually and musically."

Hot Rod Girls Save the World premiered in Seattle at 911 Media Arts November 2008. The film's East Coast premiere was at the Seventh Annual Backseat Film Festival in Philadelphia on March 6, 2009. Also screening at the festival were Sex Galaxy and a film by Bam Margera entitled Minghags: The Movie.

Midway through 2009, Portland, Oregon's DJ Prophetnoise remixed the Hot Rod Girls Save the World title theme in a dubstep-style single entitled "Hot Rod Girls Save the World Theme (Prophetnoise Dubstep Remix)". Sebasstian also made a special movie mix video to go with the song that is featured on the special features disc of the Hot Rod Girls Save the World (Kustom Edition) DVD, that was released in 2010. Sebasstian also premiered his second feature film Rat Rod Rockers! at the historic Everett Theater in Everett, Washington, on November 13, 2010, to over 400 patrons. Although Sebasstian did the film's soundtrack himself, he did not credit it as KsK (like he did with Hot Rod Girls Save the World), but rather as D.A. Sebasstian & The Inner Demons.

In 2011 Michael Ditmore, longtime KsK drummer, started a new Rock and Roll band called The Demolition Kings.

In 2020 Sebasstian formed Sci-Fi Republik, a Synth Pop style band with singer Jennifer Humphreys and singer/synthesist Goldi SinClair.

== Discography ==
=== Albums ===
- Kill Switch...Klick, 1991, Tape
- Beat it to Fit, Paint it to Match, 1993, Tape
- Beat it to Fit, Paint it to Match, 1995, CD
- Oddities and Versions, 1995, CD
- deGenerate, 1997, CD (reissued in 2006)
- ALT., 1997, CD (reissued in 2006)
- Organica, 1999, CD
- Milkin' It For All It's Worth, 2001, CD
- Almost Ambient Collection Vol. One, 2002, CD (reissued in 2006)
- Mechanoid Collection, 2006, CD
- Killing Machine E.P., 2007, CD
- Hemi Charger E.P., 2008, CD
- Sterile, 2008, CD
- It & All, 2008, CD (7 Disc Box Set)
- Ugly.Noises, 2008, CD
- Nominal, 2008, CD
- Hot Rod Girls Save The World (Original Movie Soundtrack), 2009, CD
- Hot Rod Girls Save The World (Soundtrack & Incidental Music), 2009, CD (2 Disc Set)

=== Compilation appearances ===
- Urge Ltd. Sampler (song Big Dub - 1993 Urge Ltd. Recordings)
- Contents Under Pressure (song Follow Me - 1994 NEC Recordings- cassette)
- Contents Under Pressure Ver. 02 (songs The Hobble, So Happy- 1995 NEC Recordings- cassette)
- Ghost Of A White Faced Clown; A Tribute To Gary Numan (song Are Friends Electric?- 1995 NEC Recordings- cassette)
- Masked Beauty In A Sea Of Sadness (song follow Me original version- 1994 Gothic Industry Records)
- Enchantments (song deCanonized- 1995 Cleopatra Records)
- Built For Stomping (song Celebrate The Misery- 1995 Cleopatra/ Re-Constriction Records)
- Indie-Gestion Volume 6 (song Follow Me- 1995 AP Magazine Promotional CD)
- Elektro-Industrial Sounds Of The Northwest (song Go Man, Go Klaustrophobik Mix - 1995 Cleopatra Records)
- The Passion Of Covers; A Tribute To Bauhaus (song Dark Entries- 1996 Cleopatra Records)
- Industrial Revolution Third Edition (song Fascist Smash Punch Out Mix- 1996 Cleopatra Records)
- Wired Injections (song Follow Me Machine Rock Mix- 1996 Cleopatra Records)
- TV Terror (song Welcome Back Kotter- 1997 Re-Constriction Records)
- Industrial Mix Machine (song Kontorted remixed by And Christ Wept- 1997 Cleopatra Records)
- A Tribute To The Cure: 100 Tears (song Jumping Someone Else's Train- 1997 Cleopatra Records)
- Hymns Of The Warlock: A Tribute To Skinny Puppy (song Addiction- 1998 Cleopatra Records)
- Genre-Fest Volume 1 (song Object Of My Desire 2nd Hand Mix- 1998 Ivy Records)
- Save The Warehouse (song Kontorted Radio Edit- unconfirmed release)
- Americana; A Tribute To Johnny Cash (song Folsum Prison Blues- 1998 Irregular Records)
- Death For Life (song All Things To All People- 1998 Mere Mortal Productions)
- Industrial Madness (song Produkt A- 1998 Cleopatra Records)
- New Waves Goes To Hell (song Mad World- 1998 Cleopatra Records)
- Future Wave (song Konsonent- 1998 Cleopatra Records)
- Dark Noise (song Produkt A- 1999 Cleopatra Records)
- Redeye Music Sampler 2000 (song Go Man, Go III- 2000 Redeye Distribution)
- Goth Oddity 2000- A Tribute To David Bowie (song Suffragette City- 2000 Cleopatra Records)
- Who Cares- A Tribute To The Who (song 5:15- 2000 irregular)
- This Is Industrial - Limited Edition 3-CD Set (song deCanonized- 2000 Cleopatra Records)
- This Is Goth- 3-CD Box Set (song Memories & Discontent- 2001 Cleopatra Records)
- Cash From Chaos (song Folsum Prison Blues- 2001 Invisible Records)
- Essential Goth Masters- 4-CD Box Set (song Konsonent- 2001 Big Eye Music)
- Essential Industrial Masters- 3-CD Set (song Addiction- 2002 Cleopatra Records)
- Annihilation & Seduction (song Living In Your Hell II- 2003 BLC Productions)
- New Dark Noise (song Follow Me (Sigue Sigue Sputnik Remix) - 2003 Cleopatra Records)
- Electro Cured: An Electro Tribute To The Cure (song Jumping Someone Else's Train- 2004 Cleopatra Records)
- Great Sound Clash Swindle Remixed By Keoki (song Kontorted Keoki Remix- 2004 Hypnotic Records)
- Hot Rod Girls Save The World - Music & Mayhem (song Vikki Lee N.R.F.F. Hacked Mix- 2005 Go-Kustom Rekords)
- Wild Ride! A Hot Rod & Surf Compilation (song Hemi Charger - 2008 Go-Kustom Rekords)

== Music in film & television ==
- Headless Body In Topless Bar (song Big Dub in soundtrack)
- MTV Real World Chicago (song Eventually - written with Faith & Disease)
- MTV Made (song Celebrate The Misery)
- MTV Made UK (songs Celebrate The Misery and One Minute Endless - credited D.A. Sebasstian)
- D.I.Y Or Die (DVD version song Monster Monster - credited D.A. Sebasstian in special features)
- Go-Kustom TV Theme and various backing tracks.
- Hot Rod Girls Save The World Original Soundtrack.

== Related projects ==
- 33Deep
- D.A. Sebasstian & The Inner Demons
- Flathand 5
- Kardboard
- Xijix

== Artists worked with or remixed ==
- Faith & Disease
- Gary Numan
- Gene Loves Jezebel
- Vanessa Lowe
- How's A Bayou
- Super Amanda
- Diamond Fist Werny
- And Christ Wept
- Sounds of Mass Production
- DragStrip Riot
- Wages Of SIn
- The Bad Things
- The Amateurs
- Courtney Hudak
- Juke
- Section One
- The Boxcar Tramps
- The Penningtones
- Sciflyer
- OmBilli Troupe
- Billy Dwayne & The Creepers

== Artists who remixed Kill Switch...Klick ==
- Sigue Sigue Sputnik
- Keoki
- Noxious Emotion
- And Christ Wept
- Spahn Ranch (band)

== Sources ==
- Greenlee, Brian (1996), "Kill Switch... Klick - Oddities and Versions (Cleopatra)", B-Side, vol. 10, no. 56
- Sailing, Jasmine, Cyber-Psycho's A.O.D., no. 5, Jasmine Sailing, ISSN 1084-3752, OCLC 32588420
- Botchick, Cheryl (July 19, 1999), "KILL SWITCH...KLICK, Organica - Irregular Records", CMJ New Music Report, no. 627, CMI Media, ISSN 0890-0795, OCLC 165141274
- Brighton, Michael (1993), "Two Song Demo", Gear, vol. 1, no. 22
- Lisa (1997), "Kill Switch...Klick - deGenerate (Cleopatra)", IndustrialnatioN, no. 15, Paul Valerio, ISSN 1062-449X, OCLC 25623835
- Garza, Janiss (1997), "Kill Switch...Klick - deGenerate", Option, no. 75, Sonic Options Network, ISSN 0882-178X, OCLC 11793776
- Burns, Chris (May 17, 1998), "Kill Switch...Klick, Beat it to Fit, Paint it to Match (Cleopatra CD)", The Rocket, no. 205, BAM Media
- Jensen, Kim, "Flower Child, Fatherhood mellows Kill Switch...Klick's DA Sebasstian", Voltage Magazine, no. 10, David Slatton, p. 18, ISSN 1523-8423, OCLC 40809106
