= Ed Roth =

American artist, cartoonist and custom car painter

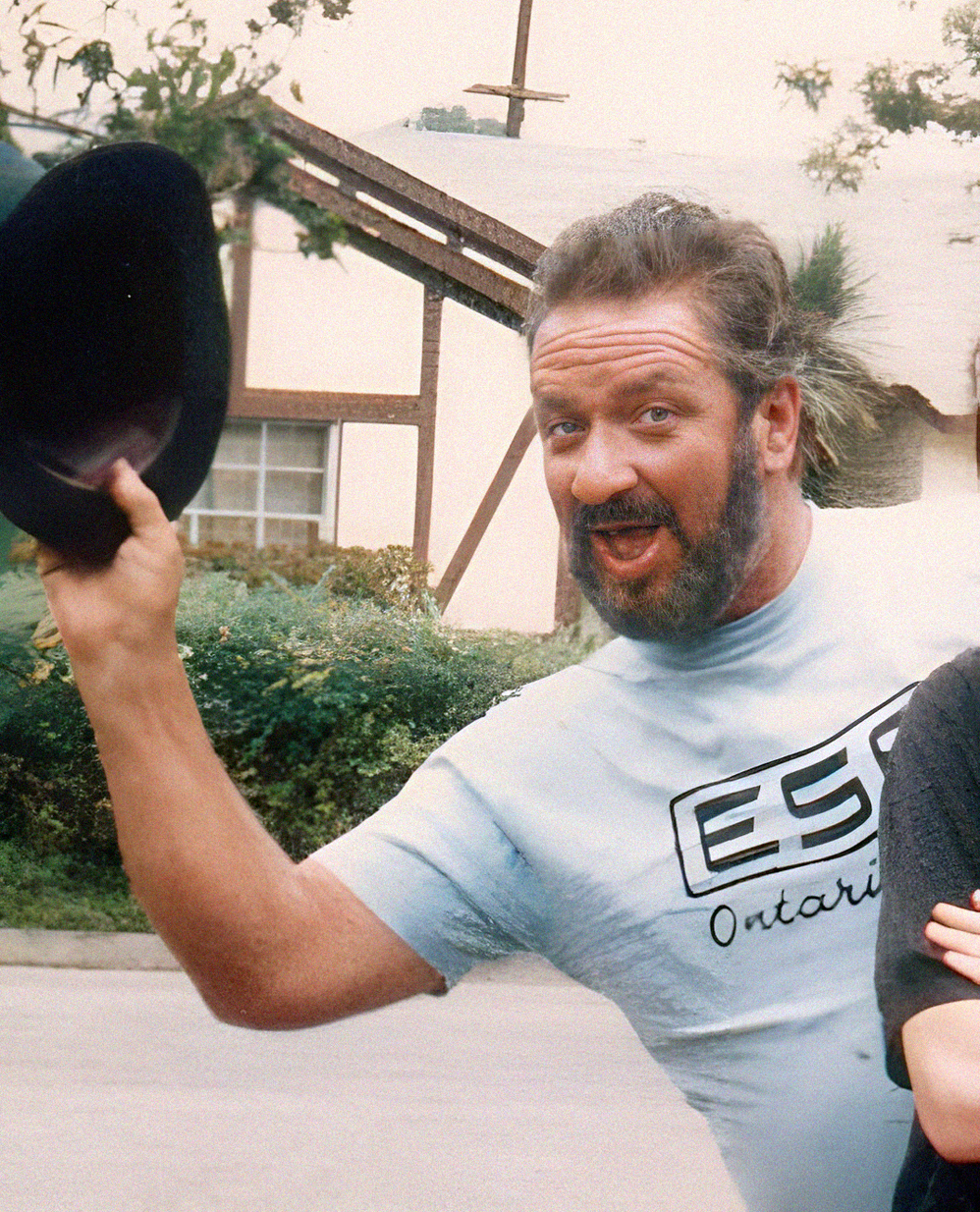
- Roth in 1987
- Born: Edward Roth; March 4, 1932; Beverly Hills, California, U.S.
- Died: April 4, 2001 (aged 69); Manti, Utah, U.S.
- Education: Self-educated
- Known for: Hot rod art, customizing and pinstriping
- Notable work: Rat Fink, among others
- Movement: Kustom Kulture

Edward "Big Daddy" Roth (March 4, 1932 – April 4, 2001) was an American artist, cartoonist, illustrator, pinstriper and custom car designer and builder who created the hot rod icon Rat Fink and other characters. Roth was a key figure in Southern California's Kustom Kulture and hot rod movement of the late 1950s and 1960s.

== Early life ==
Edward Roth was born in Beverly Hills, California. He was the son of Marie (née Bauer) and Henry Roth. He grew up in Bell, California, attending Bell High School, where his classes included auto shop and art.

At age 14, Roth acquired his first car, a 1933 Ford coupe. He studied engineering at a Los Angeles college, then served in the United States Air Force, and by the early '50s, was experimenting with fibreglass modelling.

== Career ==
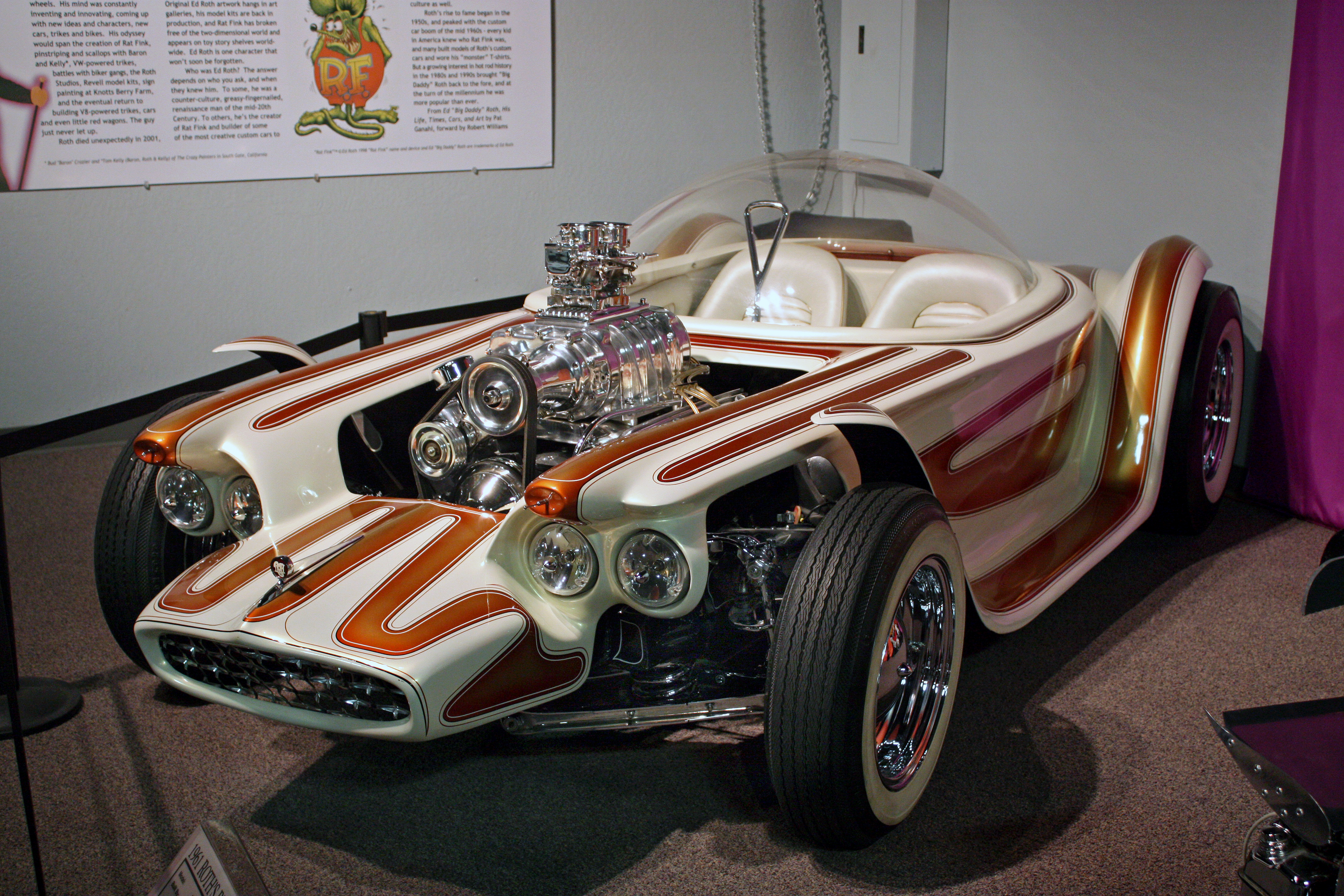
The 1961 Beatnik Bandit hot rod at the National Automobile Museum in Reno, Nevada

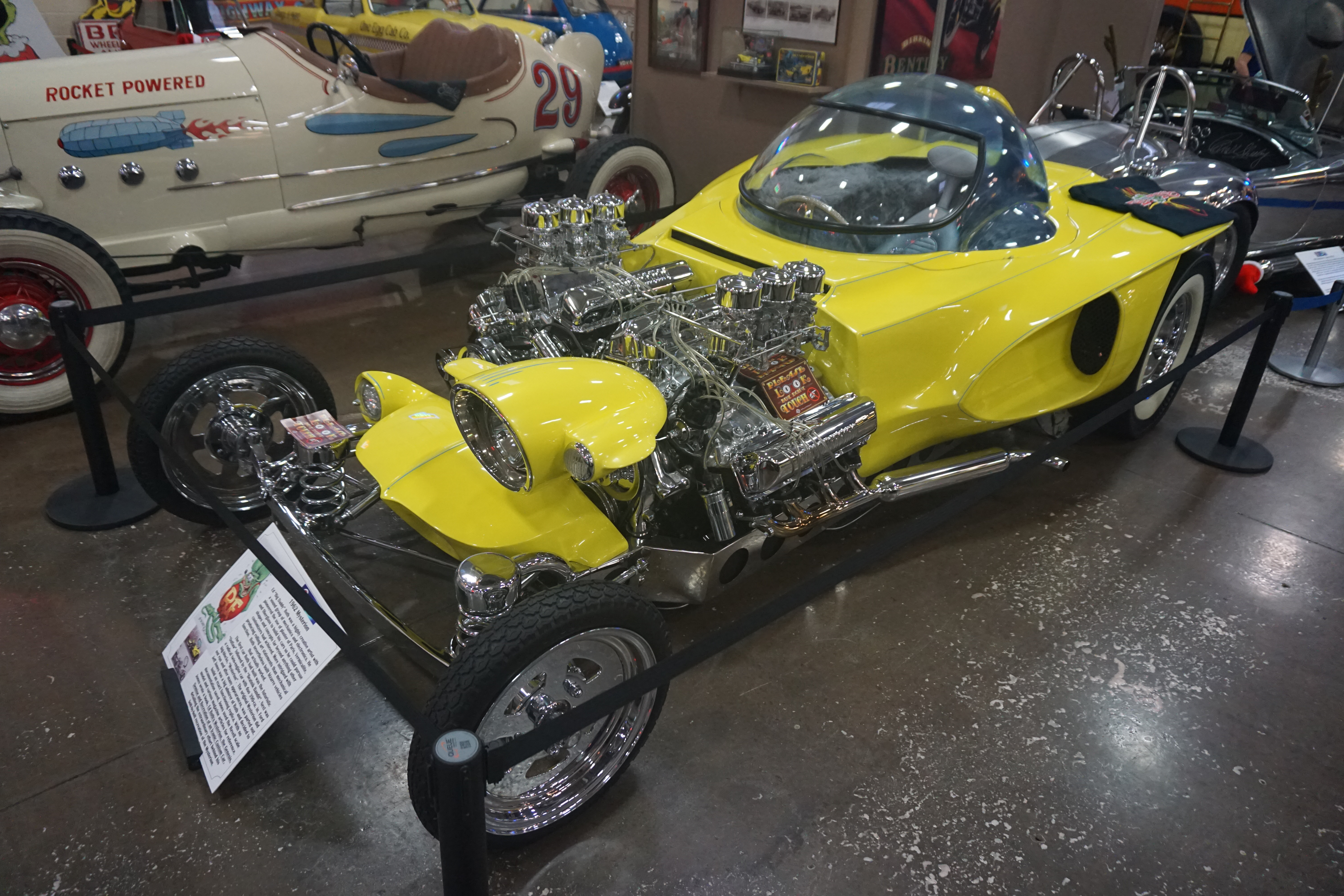
The 1962 Mysterion at Stahls Automotive Collection

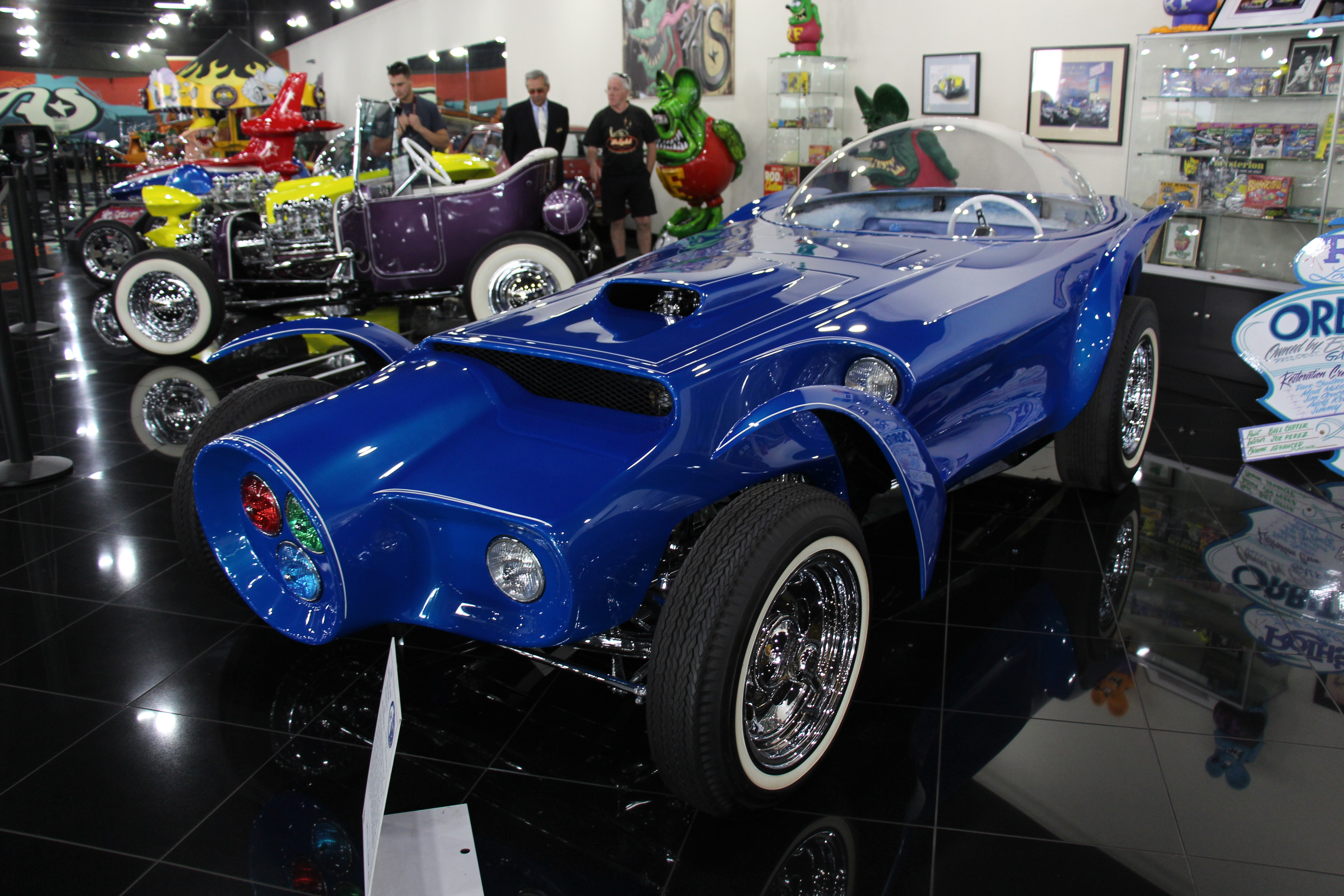
Orbitron 1964.

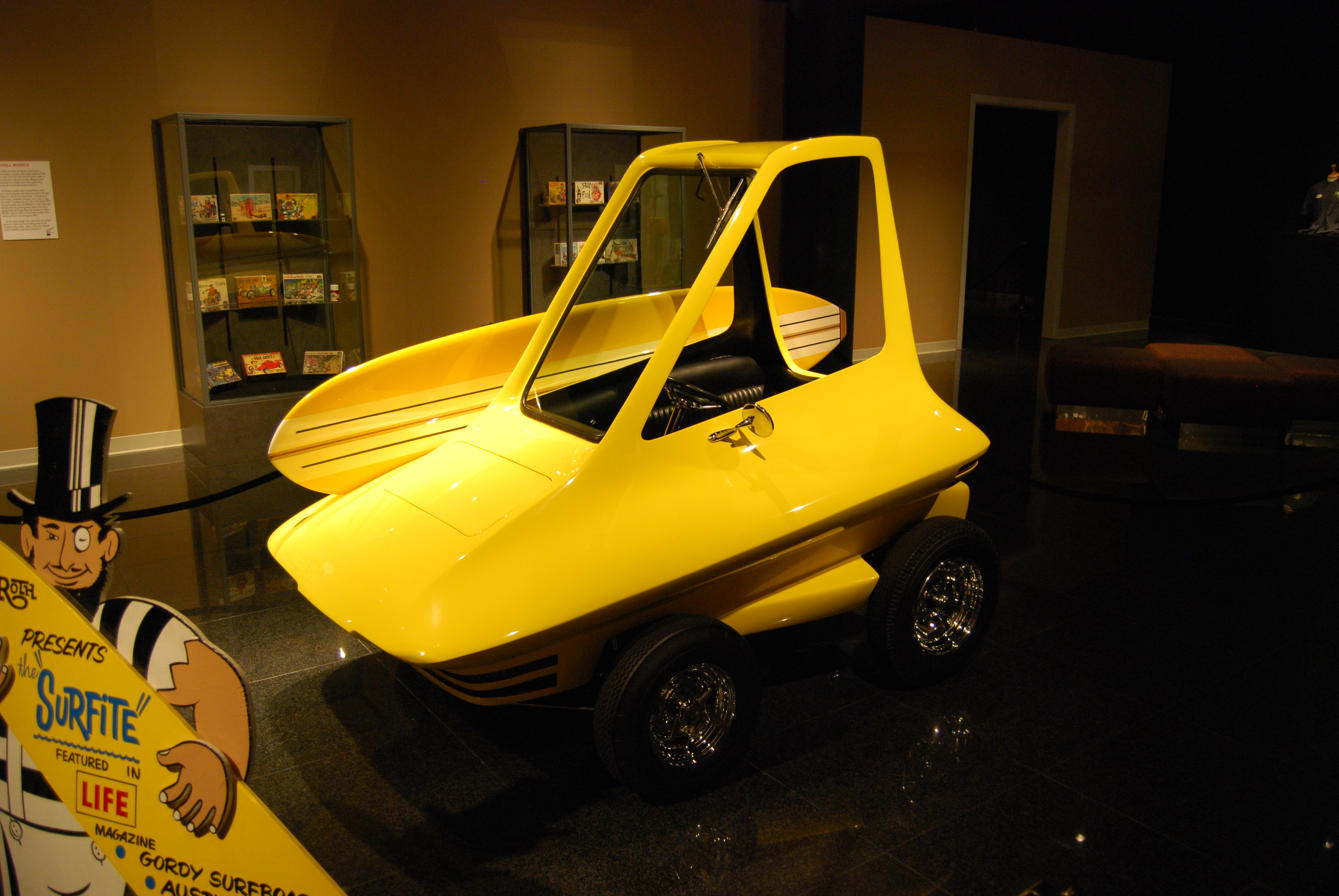
Surfite 1964.

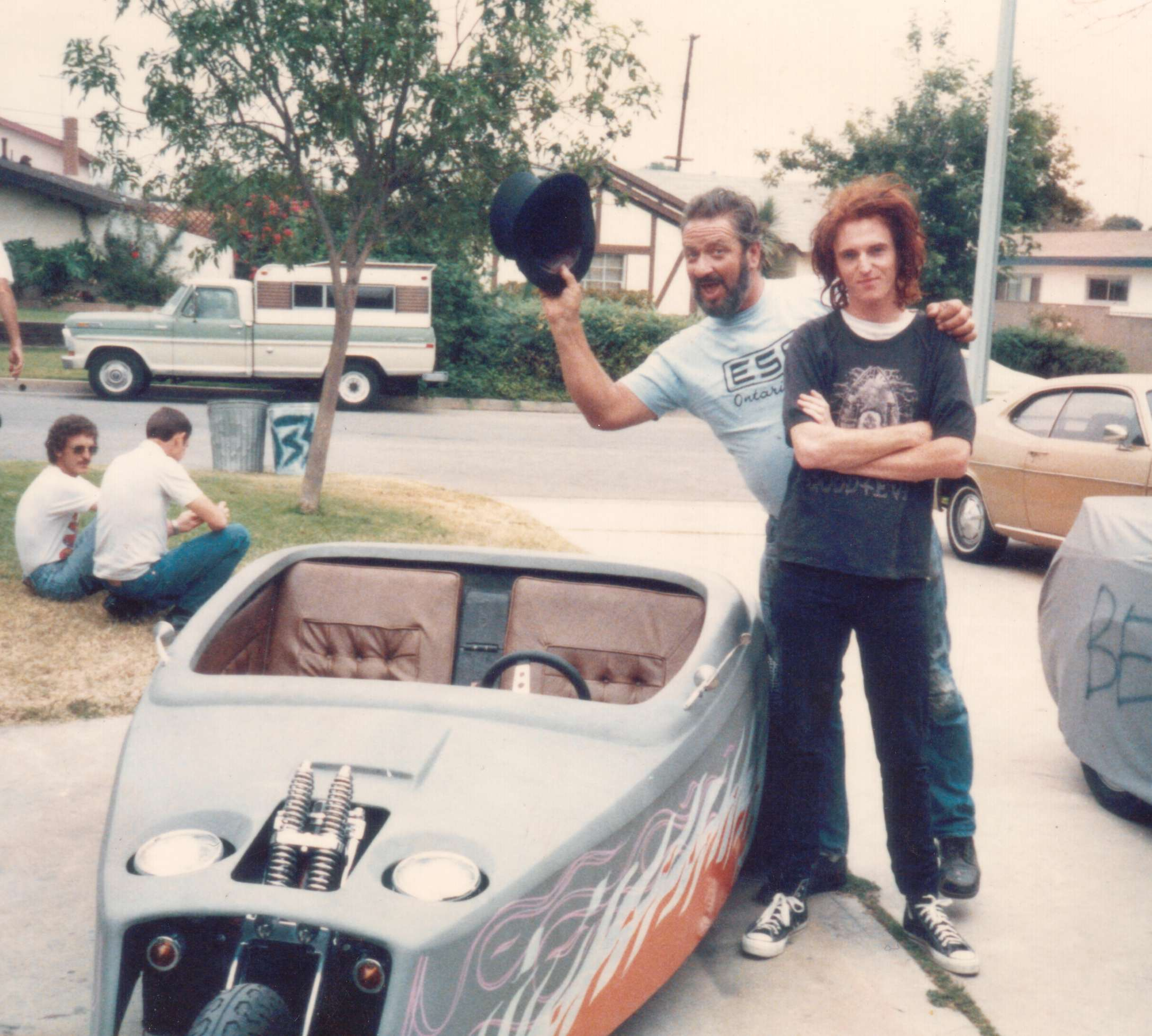
Trike Globe Hopper 1987.

Roth is best known for his grotesque caricatures—typified by Rat Fink—depicting imaginary, outsized monsters driving representations of the hot rods that he and his contemporaries built. Roth began airbrushing and selling "Weirdo" T-shirts at car shows and in the pages of Car Craft magazine as early as July 1958. By the August 1959 issue of Car Craft "Weirdo shirts" had become a full-blown craze with Roth at the forefront of the movement. The article featured Roth along with fellow Kustom Kulture pioneers Dean Jeffries and Pete Millar. Inspired by Roth and Barris Kustoms (whose shirts were airbrushed by Dean Jeffries), Detroit native Stanley Miller, a.k.a. "Stanley Mouse", began advertising his own shirts in the pages of Car Craft in January 1961. The lesser-known Rendina Studios of Detroit and Mad Mac of Cleveland also joined in on the monster "Weirdo" shirt craze, but Roth was certainly the person who widely popularized the "monsters in hot rods" art form.

In 1959, Roth created the Outlaw. This fiberglass Kustom hot rod was featured in the January 1960 issue of Car Craft. The car was covered in Car Craft and Rod and Custom, and appeared at custom car and hot rod shows. Other hot rods include the Beatnik Bandit (1961), the twin Ford engined Mysterion (1963), the Orbitron (1964), and the Road Agent (1965), among others. In 1965, Roth's surf buggy, the Surfite, was featured in the film Beach Blanket Bingo starring Frankie Avalon and Annette Funicello, and also in Village of the Giants, featuring Beau Bridges and Tommy Kirk. One of Roth's personal drivers was a tangerine orange 1955 Chevy 2-door post with a Ford 406 cu. in. engine under the hood; he drove this car to his shop every day for years.

In 1962, the Revell model company began selling plastic models of Roth's cars and from 1963 to 1965 Revell also manufactured plastic models of many of Roth's monsters, including Rat Fink, Brother Rat Fink, Drag Nut, Mother's Worry, Mr. Gasser and other weird creatures created by Roth. Revell continues to re-issue Roth's Monsters and Kustom Car kits.

In 1963, the Hawk Model Company issued its line of "Weird-Ohs" plastic models and Marx Toys issued Nutty Mads, both clearly inspired by Roth's work. Both items were quite popular in the mid-60s and remain sought after collector's items to this day. Hawk Models continues to re-issue its "Weird-Ohs" periodically.

A “corporate publicist” gave the 6 ft 4 in (1.93 m) tall Roth the nickname "Big Daddy".

Numerous artists were associated with Roth including artist David Mann, Rat Fink Comix artist R.K. Sloane, Steve Fiorilla who illustrated some of Roth's catalogs, and most notably, Ed Newton, who worked for Roth and designed several of his cars and T-shirt designs beginning in 1964, and Kustom Kulture icon Robert Williams who began working for Roth in late 1965.

In the mid-1960s, Roth began customizing motorcycles. Mainstream motorcycle magazines refused to run his articles and ads, so he started his own publication called Choppers, which featured articles on extending forks, custom sissy bars, etc. It was a small, black and white publication that ran from 1967 to 1970, and was the first magazine ever to exclusively feature custom motorcycles, or choppers. Roth also built the first known VW powered trike. Roth built many trikes for himself and others, including Candy Wagon, California Cruiser, Secret Weapon, Rubber Ducky and The Great Speckled Bird.

In 1967, Roth built the Mega Cycle, Originally named by Robert Williams, "Captain Pepi's Motorcycle & Zeppelin Repair" was later changed to the "Mega Cycle" after a strong suggestion from car show promoters. Powered by a Buick V6 engine, Mega Cycle was designed to carry Ed's Harley XLCH. Later Ed felt that the XLCH just did not work and, through a series of trades, ended up with Bob Aquistapase's award-winning Triumph. The Mega Cycle is currently on display at Motorcyclepedia Museum in Newburgh, NY.

In 1968, Mattel introduced Hot Wheels and Roth’s Beatnik Bandit was one of the first 16 die-cast toy cars produced by the company.

From 1970 to 1975, Roth worked for Brucker's Movie World and their "Cars of the Stars" display. Brucker said that Roth was very loyal and a very hard worker, even though he was not making much money. Brucker said that when building something, Roth had a natural knack for seeing how things fit together — he would build something in a few days which would take others a couple of weeks. Although Roth was laid-back and amiable, Brucker also remembers that Roth was a fighter and if anyone came through the museum causing trouble, Roth would put them in line. He was fearless. Roth's Druid Princess was one of the many cars displayed there. Also during the 1970s, Roth worked for Knott's Berry Farm as a sign painter and artist. He worked there for 10 years until about 1980, and among other things, did the lettering on many of the descriptive labels for objects in the Western Trails Museum at Knott's.

In December 1977, Robert and Suzanne Williams, along with Skip Barrett, organized the first Rat Fink Reunion to celebrate the legacy of Roth. Rat Fink Reunions are still held to this day at the site of Roth's final residence in Manti, Utah and near Los Angeles.

In 1993, a major exhibition was held at the Julie Rico Gallery in Santa Monica shortly after the Laguna Museum show "Kustom Kulture". It was at this time that the lowbrow art movement began to take on steam. Featured in the exhibition titled, "Rat Fink Meets Fred Flypogger Meets Cootchy Cooty" were Roth, Willams, and Mouse and their creations. The L.A. Times placed Roth's Rat Fink on the cover of the Culture section December 20, 1993, with a full article about the entire exhibition. Artist Jean Jacques Bastarache collaborated with Ed Big Daddy Roth for this exhibition creating paintings called Master Finks. Images were used from historical watershed paintings by well-known artists like Duchamp, Whistler and Miro among others. Roth drew an image of his Rat Fink character acting out in a funny way on each painting while Jean Jacques Bastarache created the Master Fink underlying painting. The paintings in all can be seen in the book titled Rat Fink: The Art of Ed "Big Daddy" Roth published by Last Gasp in 1993.

The Orbitron, a Roth custom car that was the subject of a number of articles in automotive enthusiast magazines (most notably, in Car Craft magazine in 1965) which was feared lost in subsequent decades, was discovered in Mexico in the summer of 2008. The Orbitron was built in 1964. The car, in dilapidated, inoperative condition, had been parked for some time in front of an adult bookstore in Ciudad Juárez. The owners of the shop were also the owners of the car. It was purchased and taken back to the United States by Michael Lightbourn, an American auto restorer who did business in Mexico. The Orbitron has been restored to its original condition by Beau Boeckmann.

Roth was active in counterculture art and hot-rodding his entire adult life. At the time of his death in 2001, he was working on a hot-rod project involving a compact car planned as a departure from the dominant tuner performance modification style.

The year after his death, he was named as one of the "50 Who Made a Difference" at the 50th annual Meguiar's Autorama in Detroit. He was also inducted into the show's "Circle of Champions" in 2000, and was showcased as its "Builder of the Year" in 2006.

== Mr. Gasser & the Weirdos ==
Mr. Gasser & the Weirdos was a 1960s novelty music group led by Roth, who was known as Mr. Gasser. Formed in the early 1960s, they released a few bizarre surf rock albums, most notably 1963's Hot Rod Hootenanny. One Way Records released a two-CD set (S22-18319) containing the three LPs and the original artwork.

== Roth and bikers ==
Roth had his shop, that he started in early 1959, at 4616 Slauson Avenue in Maywood, California (about 8 miles southeast of downtown Los Angeles). He ran an ad in Car Craft magazine that year announcing the new address of his shop.

During the mid 1960s, Roth associated with various outlaw motorcycle clubs who congregated at his shop as a lot of bikers were then living in Lynwood and Maywood. Musicians, police officers, FBI agents and various people involved in Hollywood would visit as well, providing an environment for one of Ed Roth's most creative periods, and an important time in Kustom Kulture.

Roth incorporated the Iron Cross into his artwork (surfers had previously been using the iron cross as a symbol of youthful, carefree rebellion). Roth did not own a bike at the time, so he bought a brand-new Harley-Davidson Sportster and then proceeded to paint its gas tank a flat black color. Roth painted white lettering on one side of the tank that said: "Love is Hate"; and on the reverse side: "Hate is Love".

Roth had taken black and white photos of different bikers. He made posters, with titles like "Beautiful Buzzard", or "Gray Cat" out of these photos, and sold them at car shows. Roth would periodically give these bikers small amounts of money, but soon some of the bikers started to feel that Roth was "getting rich" off of them and they wanted a larger cut. Despite Roth's agreement, rumors began to circulate that a certain club intended to attack Roth's shop. The gang arrived at the shop with guns drawn, but Roth's crew defended themselves. Roth challenged the head biker to a one-on-one fist fight to settle matters in the middle of the shop. Eventually Roth gained the upper hand and "just started to beat the living crap out of the guy".

After this incident, Roth burned his biker posters, leaving the lifestyle behind. Things started winding down at the shop in the late 1960s, and in 1970 the shop closed.

== Personal life ==
Roth was married four times. His fourth wife, Ilene, lives in Manti, Utah, where Roth spent the final years of his life. Roth joined the Church of Jesus Christ of Latter-day Saints in 1974. He shaved off his goatee and was heavily involved in social work through the church. His brother Gordon also became a Latter-day Saint.

At a 1999 lecture given at Brigham Young University's Museum of Art, Roth shared some lessons he had learned in life: "accept criticism; if you can't do it get help; you don't need fancy tools or a fancy garage; and if you fulfill your duty Heavenly Father will bless you in what you do."

Roth died of a heart attack on April 4, 2001, at the age of 69. Since his death, the official Rat Fink Reunion has been held in Manti the first weekend in June. The museum that Ilene Roth created to honor her late husband includes displays of Roth's art work and other memorabilia. Roth's son Darryl has been working on collecting and displaying his father's work.

== See also ==
- The Kandy-Kolored Tangerine-Flake Streamline Baby
- Von Dutch
