= Orbitron =

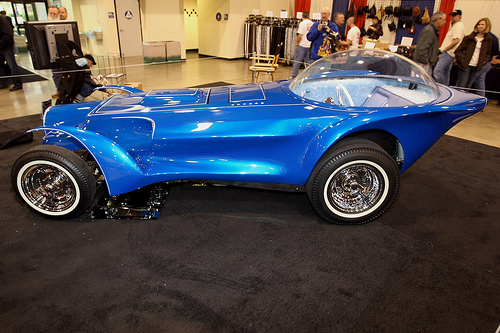
- Restored Orbitron in Pomona, California, 2009.

Overview
- Designer: Ed Roth, Ed Newton

Body and chassis
- Class: Custom car

Powertrain
- Engine: Chevrolet V8
- Transmission: Powerglide

The Orbitron is a custom car built by Ed Roth. It was feared lost until being rediscovered in Mexico in 2007.

== Construction ==
Built in 1964, the vehicle was powered by a 1955 or 1956 Chevrolet V8 backed by a Powerglide automatic transmission. The body was hand-laid fiberglass, hiding Roth's extensive chrome work to the chassis. The cockpit, set at the extreme rear of the vehicle in the manner of a dragster, was lined with fake fur and featured an 11-inch General Electric "1-Touch" portable television mounted in the console. Topping the cockpit was a custom-made, hydraulically operated Plexiglas bubble top. One of a series of ordinary doorbell push-button switches atop the hood activated the top from the outside.

Other mechanical features included a 1956 Chevrolet rear end, dropped Ford front beam axle, Buick brake drums and early Ford brakes. The frame was handmade of rectangular 2x4 inch steel tubing. The engine was a leftover from one of Roth's 1955 Chevrolets, having been removed to make way for a then-new Mark IV big-block given to him by General Motors. It was one of the very few completed cars Roth deemed to be a "mistake" because he felt the car did not show well because the heavily chromed engine and most of the chassis were hidden. The Orbitron was one of his few customs to have a hood. Reportedly, the hydraulically operated hood did not fit well due to rushed fiberglass work.

The vehicle's most distinctive feature was its asymmetrical front end with red, green and blue tinted headlamps. It was thought that the three beams when combined would produce an intense white light; the idea came from the then-new medium of color television.

== Ownership ==
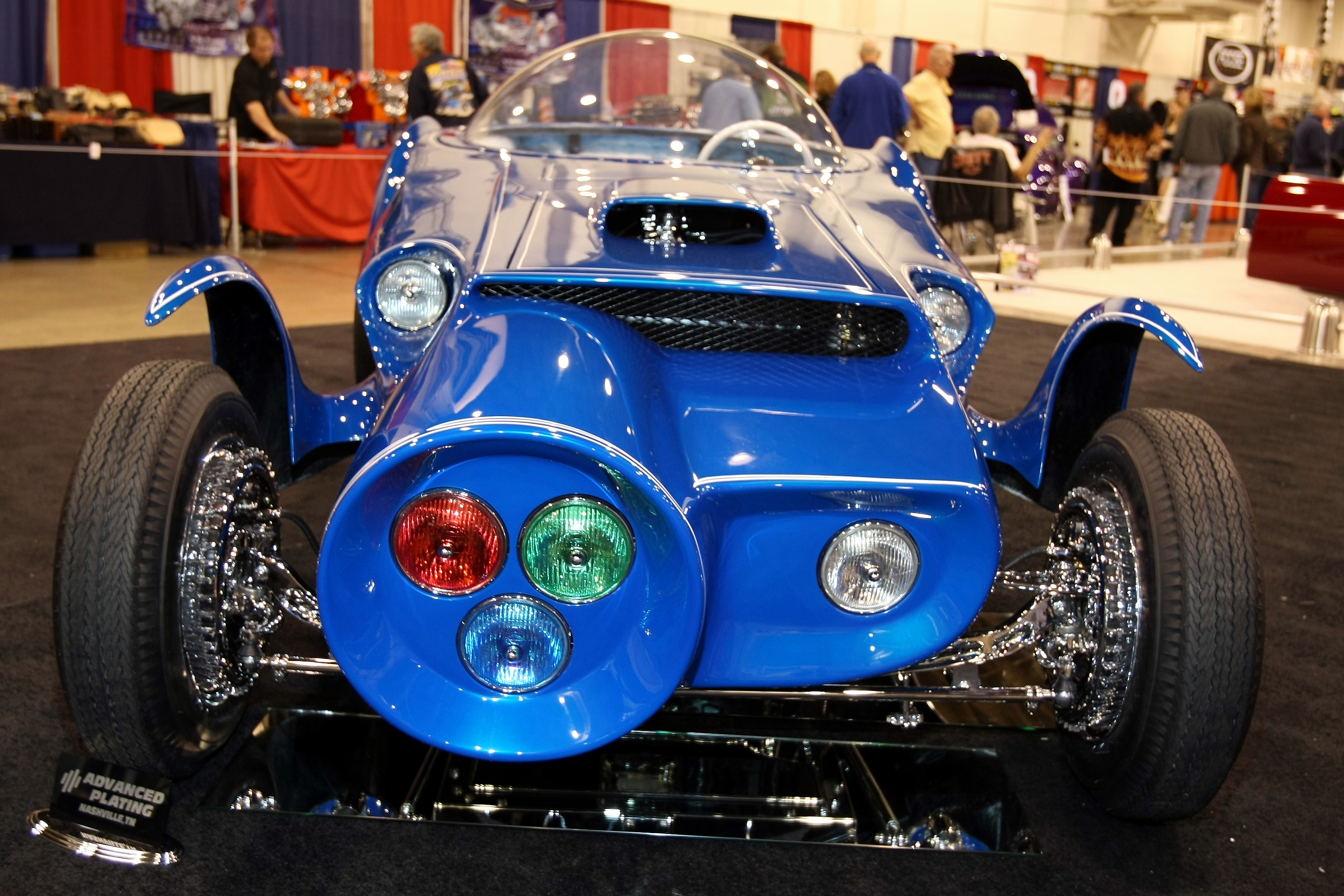
Front view of the Orbitron with the unique red, green and blue Lucas headlamps.

Fellow automotive customizer Darryl Starbird purchased the vehicle from Roth in 1967 for US$750.00. Starbird traded the vehicle some years later to an unidentified collector in Texas. From Texas the Orbitron was traded to a carnival owner in Ciudad Juárez, Chihuahua, Mexico in or around 1991. By that time the asymmetrical nose had been cut off and discarded, possibly for additional air flow to the radiator for the car's use in and around the carnivals.

Automotive restorer Michael Lightbourn, who heard rumors of the car's existence in Ciudad Juárez, discovered it parked in front of an adult bookstore for use as an advertising aid. The car had been sprayed in faded black primer and was basically complete except for the hood, the tachometer, the television, the fur lining, the long-missing nose and the bubble top, believed destroyed in the early 1970s when it became stuck and trapped the car's then-owner.

The family who owned the bookstore had also owned the carnival in which the car was used. After intense negotiations with the family, who were reluctant to sell the deteriorating vehicle for what they said were sentimental reasons, Lightbourn was finally able to return the Orbitron to the United States. Upon its return, the Orbitron was sold to Beau Boeckmann of "Galpin Auto Sports" fame.

== Restoration ==
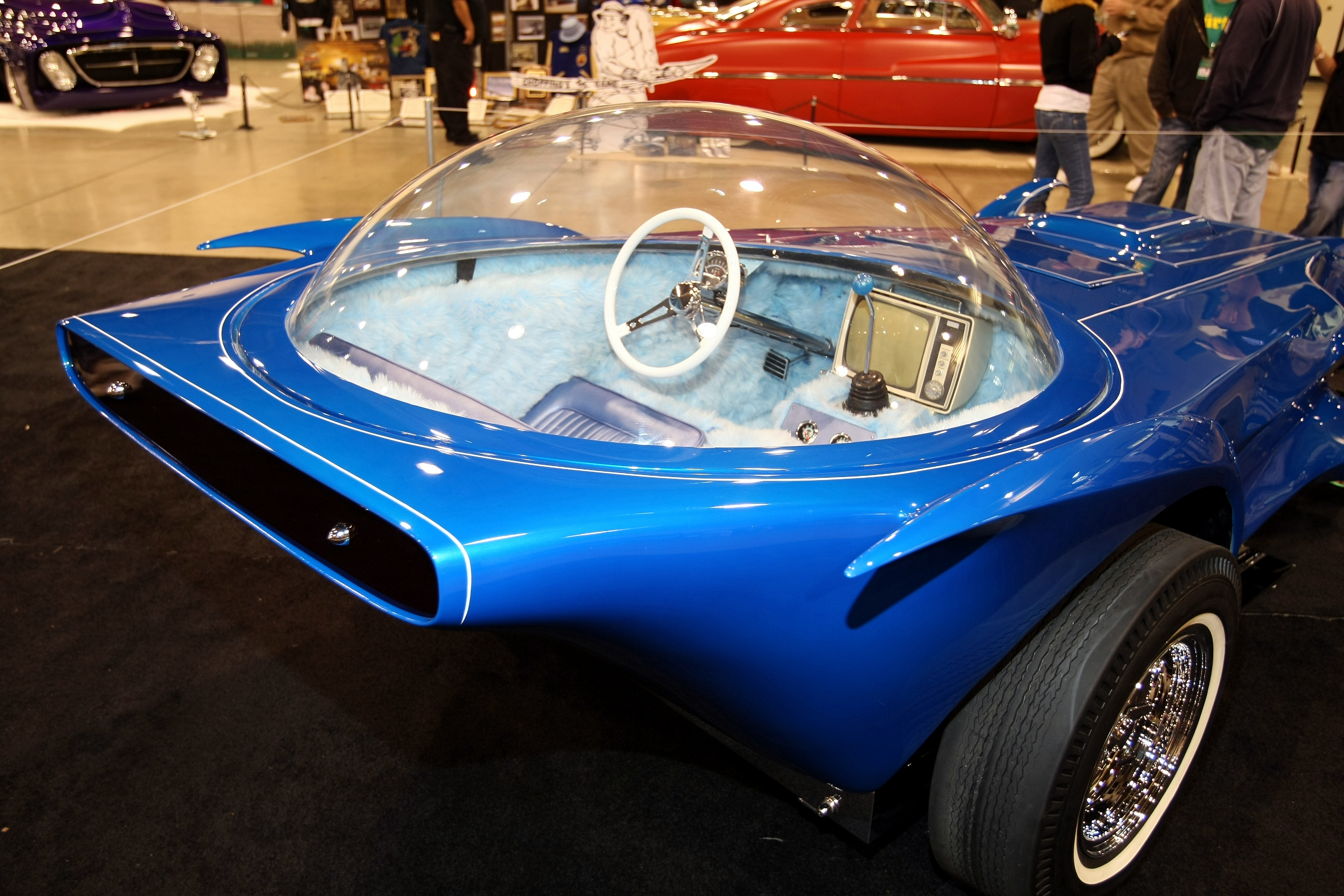
Cockpit of the Orbitron. The General Electric television is an identical replacement obtained on an eBay auction. The steering wheel is the restored original.

Boeckmann completed the restoration of the car in approximately 100 days. All original parts removed from the car, including the frame which was too rusted to reuse, were retained and archived by Boeckmann. Accuracy of the project was supervised by former Roth designer Ed "Newt" Newton, who assisted in the original 1964 design.

The restoration includes a television of the same type originally installed in the console. A small reel-to-reel tape recorder hidden in the cockpit, which was intended to play a musical recording of the car's features, was discovered along with the original tape during the restoration process and is in working order; the recording was reportedly done by Tex Ritter. Planet Plastics of Chino, California, the original company contracted to create the bubble top, was contracted to create a replacement. Evidence of the car's original "candy blue" color (similar in execution to "candy apple red") was discovered within the interior and was used as a basis for matching the replacement finish. Paint work was overseen by Larry Watson, who painted the car in 1964. Watson was joined by his original assistant, Bill Carter, who applied the new finish. A descendant of the individual responsible for the pin-striping applied the new pin-striping to the vehicle upon its completion. Interior restoration was by Joe Perez, who was responsible for the original upholstery work as well. The original Chevrolet engine with its rare Stromberg 97 triple carburetor setup and Chevrolet Corvette finned aluminum valve covers has been rebuilt and reinstalled.

It is the cover subject of the March 2009 edition of Hot Rod Deluxe, a "retro" version of Hot Rod Magazine.
