= Roxi D'Lite =

Canadian burlesque performer

Roxi D’Lite
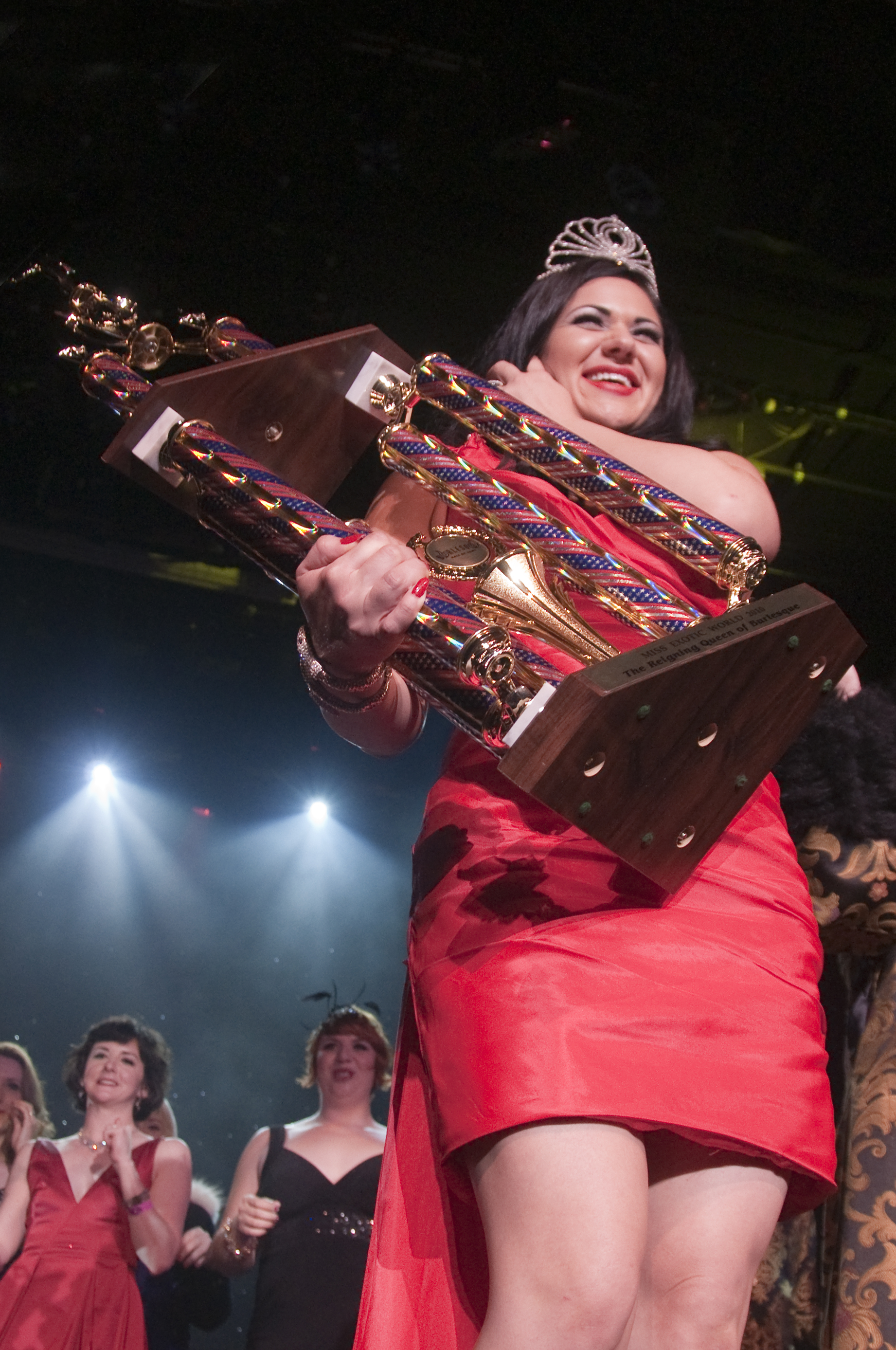
- Roxi D'Lite moments after being crowned Miss Exotic World 2010
- Born: Windsor, Ontario, Canada
- Occupations: Burlesque performer, actress, model, photographer
- Website: www.roxidlite.com

Roxi D'Lite is a Canadian burlesque performer, model and photographer and producer from Windsor, Ontario. In 2014 she was the World Champion of Exotic Dance, the Exotic Dancer Invitational Showgirl Champion and was crowned Reigning Queen of Burlesque and Miss Exotic World 2010 at the Burlesque Hall of Fame in Las Vegas. She is known as the Bad Girl of Burlesque

== Background ==
Roxi D'Lite resides in Detroit, Michigan and is Métis. As a child she studied gymnastics and later trained in aerial acrobatics with a former Cirque Du Soleil performer while performing feature shows in gentlemen's clubs which is where she learned and developed her unique style of burlesque.

== Dance ==
She began dancing while finishing the graphic design program at St. Clair College. She discovered burlesque by accident in 2005 while working as a dancer in a couples club. She drew her inspiration from both old Hollywood glamour as well as Miss Piggy, and developed retro-inspired striptease acts. After an audience member praised her for "bringing back burlesque", she then studied its culture and history. The Windsor Star notes, "Ironically, Roxi would never have been able to immerse herself in old-time burlesque if it weren’t for modern technology." Mixing the old and the new has become the hallmark for Roxi, often mixing classic-burlesque themes with modern props, pole tricks and aerial acrobatics.

== Awards ==
Roxi D'Lite has received numerous accolades throughout her career. Most recently, Roxi D'Lite was named the top burlesque performer in the world.

In 2014, Roxi D'Lite was invited to compete in the Exotic Dancer Invitational competition where she was crowned the Showgirl Champion and named the Best Dancer. Two weeks later, Roxi competed in the Grand Prix of Exotic Dance where she was crowned World Champion of Exotic Dance and won the titles of Best Burlesque Performer and Best Exotic Dancer.

In 2009, Roxi D'Lite was the first Canadian in history to be invited to compete for the coveted Miss Exotic World title. She performed her act, the Runaway Bride, which culminates in an aerial act with a giant diamond mounted on top of an aerial hoop. The 2009 Miss Exotic World pageant was Roxi's first competition. In 2009, she won the 1st Runner-up to Miss Exotic World and earned a return appearance at the 2010 Miss Exotic World Pageant.

In 2010, Roxi D'Lite won the Miss Exotic World Pageant, the most prestigious burlesque title in the world and became the first Canadian to do so. She performed her signature act, the Smoking Cigar, which features a 12-foot smoking cigar and ashtray. D'Lite says the act was inspired by an old photograph of film noir legend Marlene Dietrich.

She was voted one of the top 5 burlesque performers in the world and she was named one of the hottest modern burlesque performers in the world. She has been called a "burlesque queen" by the Detroit Free Press and "stellar act" by The Globe and Mail.

== Photography ==
D'Lite specializes in pin-up and glamour photography. Her work has appeared in numerous publications including The Globe and Mail. Roxi has photographed the top stars of burlesque but is most known for her self-portraits. She styles, shoots and edits all her own photos that are said to "exude softness, warmth and strength all at once."

== Appearances ==
Roxi D'Lite stars in the feature film Burlesque Assassins. The film is a 1950s Cold War-era, adventure-comedy shot entirely in Calgary, Alberta, Canada. D'Lite plays Bourbon Sue, a "hard-drinking, cigar-loving delinquent prone to dust-ups with the local toughs, but also has an affinity for acrobatic dancing. So she joins the titular squad of Assassins, who end up being the world's last line of defence." D'Lite trained in hand-to-hand combat for the film's fight scenes. The film also features real-life burlesque performers from around the world.

She starred in the critically acclaimed Wonderland, a burlesque inspired re-telling of the Lewis Carroll classic, Alice's Adventures in Wonderland. The stage show, described as a "dazzling visual display", featured notable Detroit-area performers as well as an original soundtrack scored by a seven-piece band.

Roxi D'Lite is an anchor performer in Detroit's Theatre Bizarre.

Roxi D'Lite was a spokesmodel for a Canadian lingerie company and has modeled for numerous publications including CK Deluxe and Java's Bachelor Pad Magazine.

She appeared in Issue 20 of the Dark Horse comic book The Goon. The Eisner Award-winning author Eric Powell interviewed Roxi as part of his research for the burlesque-inspired issue. Powell later made Roxi a guest star in Issue 36 where she was portrayed as the villain.

== See also ==
- Great Canadian Burlesque
