= Hot Rod Girls Save the World =

- film poster
- Directed by: D.A. Sebasstian
- Written by: D.A. Sebasstian
- Produced by: D.A. Sebasstian
- Starring: Lindsay Calkins; Kimberly Lynn Layfield; Melene Marie Bro; David Nance
- Cinematography: D.A. Sebasstian
- Edited by: D.A. Sebasstian
- Music by: KsK
- Production company: Go-Kustom Films
- Distributed by: Go-Kustom Films
- Release date: November 15, 2008
- Country: United States
- Language: English

Hot Rod Girls Save the World is a 2008 B-movie written and directed by D.A. Sebasstian.

== Plot ==
Newspaper reporter Vanessa Trojan (Lindsay Calkins) is sent to "Anywhere, Washington," to do a feature on two female racing legends. When the women, Jo Leene Dodge (Melene Marie Brown) and Betty Petty (Kimberly Lynn Layfield), take her to a rockabilly house party, a glowing light appears in the night sky and people begin to feel ill. The party ends with a huge fight between Jo Leene and her jealous rival Vikki Lee. The next morning Vicki Lee has disappeared, leaving only a few severed fingers on the seat of her car. Jo Leene is accused of her murder. But when more people turn up missing or dead, Anywhere's only detective, Detective Lloyd (Jimmi Davies), realizes that this is much bigger than a simple murder case.

== Cast ==
- Lindsay Calkins as Vanessa Trojan
- Kimberly Lynn Layfield as Betty Petty (Layfield, in real life, was murdered in the 2012 Seattle cafe shooting spree)
- Melene Marie Brown as Jo Leene Dodge
- Jimmi Davies as Detective Lloyd
- Jesse James Stewart as Johnny DeSoto
- J. Maki as Nell Petty-Tucker
- Michael Ditmore as Funkendaa
- Fanovitch Sebasstian as Naginmaa
- Tommie Powell as Gus
- Denise Ure as Patty

== Production ==
Made on a small budget, the film features hot rods, aliens and zombies. The cast includes newcomers Lindsay Calkins, Kimberly Lynn Layfield, Jimmi Davies, J Maki, David Nance, Michael Ditmore, Shawn Shelton, Chris Darland, Ryan Keezer and Melene Marie Brown, with an original soundtrack by KsK (Kill Switch...Klick).

== Release ==
The film premiered at the 911 Media Arts Center in Seattle, WA. on November 15, 2008 to a sold out crowd. The first Festival Premiere was at the Backseat Film Festival March 6, 2009, in Philadelphia, PA. and was selected for the First Annual Hot Rod Monsters Film Festival in Seattle, Washington. A "First Edition" DVD release was made available on December 11, 2008. KsK (Kill Switch...Klick) has released a soundtrack album of their work in the film on Go-Kustom Rekords. This is the original soundtrack music written for the film, not the incidental music that includes music by The Invisible Surfers, The Dirty Birds, Faith & Disease, Super Amanda, Billy Dwayne & The Creepers, The Mercury 4, Heather Hexx & The Hellions and With Eease. Hot Rod Girls Save The World was licensed by IndieFlix.com and released via their online distribution network on August 18, 2009.

== Reception ==
Most reviews have been favorable with Paul Parcellin of Film Threat noting that the musical sequences have high production values and seem designed to stand alone as music videos. Though complimentary of the film, he further notes that "...the occasional use of unnecessary graphical element here and there – washed out color, frames rendered in high contrast so that the scene looks like a cartoon – that distract from the story rather than tell it", but granted "To be fair, this is a movie made by musicians who are admittedly taking a stab at filmmaking for the first time. You’ve got to admire their tenacity in getting the thing done." Film Threats overall rating of the film was a 3.5 out of 5 stars or a "Great" rating. Allan Mayes of Ol' Skool Rodz magazine gave a mixed review: "The acting in HRGSTW is bad, but we think that may be on purpose. The soundtrack, from KsK is good and the movie flows right along. We’d suggest watching it with friends rather than alone, because you’re going to want to laugh and comment on it. And it’s a hot rod movie. When's the last time we had one of those?" and Daniel Strohl of Hemmings eWeekly concurred when he wrote "if you intend to watch Hot Rod Girls Save the World, don’t expect your typical film viewing experience". Blue Suede News found that Jimmie Davies did a credible job as Detective Lloyd and opined that they enjoyed the work of Melene Marie Brown and Kimberly Lynn Layfield, but felt the film could have benefited from tighter editing, as 122 minutes was "a bit longish".
