= Great Canadian Burlesque =

Great Canadian Burlesque is the longest running burlesque monthly in Toronto and founder of the Canadian Burlesque Hall of Fame. Notable performers who have been on Great Canadian Burlesque stages are Tempest Storm, April March, Amber Ray, and two winners of Miss Exotic World Pageant, Roxi D'lite and Indigo Blue.

Great Canadian Burlesque has produced "Girlesque, the Largest Independent Burlesque Expo in Canada" for 8 years; and is the co-producer of the Toronto Burlesque Festival.

It also produces the Burlesque Brunch and has been acclaimed in The Globe and Mail, CBC News, Global News and other media sources (see References).
