= Bo Huff =

American custom car fabricator and designer

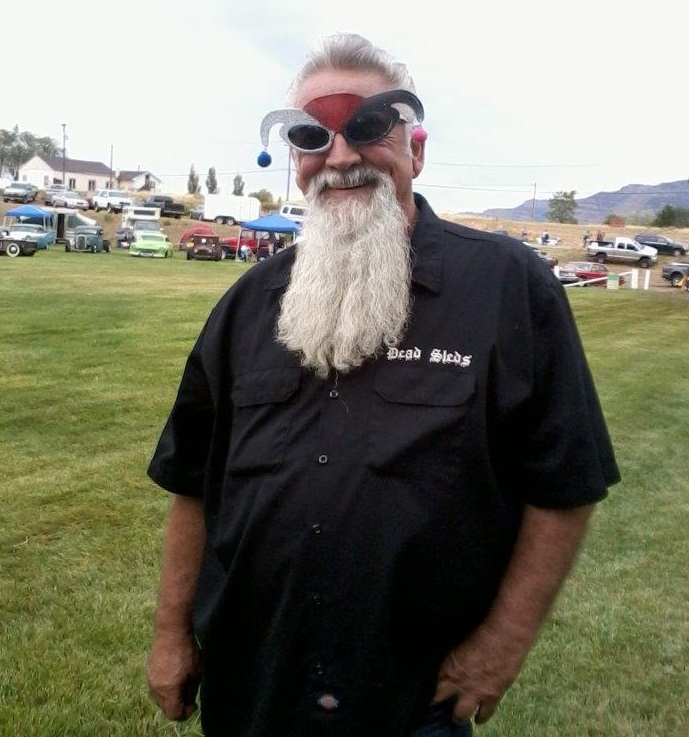
- Bo Huff in East Carbon, Utah, July 2012
- Born: Gerald Douglas Huff; March 12, 1943; Clarksville, Arkansas, U.S.
- Died: August 4, 2015 (aged 72); East Carbon, Utah
- Known for: Hot rod customizing
- Movement: Kustom Kulture

Gerald Douglas "Bo" Huff (March 12, 1943 – August 4, 2015) was an American custom car designer and an influential figure in the American Kustom Kulture and hot rod movement. He was known as the "Rockabilly King" in the American custom car scene for his promotion of Kustom Kulture lifestyle, rat rods, and custom cars, and was identified as one of the top 20th and early 21st century American custom car designers.

== Early life ==
Gerald Huff was born on March 12, 1943, in Clarksville, Arkansas, to Junior Gervis and Corene Crossno Huff. He had a sister named Ada Jean. In 1951, the Huff family left Arkansas for coal mining work opportunities in the town of Dragerton, Utah—a town that was later merged with the neighboring town of Columbia, Utah and incorporated as East Carbon. Junior Gervis Huff would spend 23 years working in the Carbon County coal mines.

The young Gerald Huff first became interested in cars by reading fledgling hot rod magazines of the 1950s and by watching older boys and men send sparks flying as they sped by in their lowered "tail-dragger" cars on the streets of Dragerton and Salt Lake City. Huff attended East Carbon High School, but often skipped class to go to Salt Lake City, which was an alluring hotspot with pretty girls and an active car scene.

By age 18, Huff was listening to rockabilly music and had adopted what would become his lifelong signature fashion—ducktail hair, cuffed jeans, and engineer boots. He had also begun working on one of his first cars, a 1950 Dodge, modifying it with heated springs and bumpers that he had swapped out from a 1949 Plymouth. He also joined his first car club—the now defunct Scrapers of Dragerton.

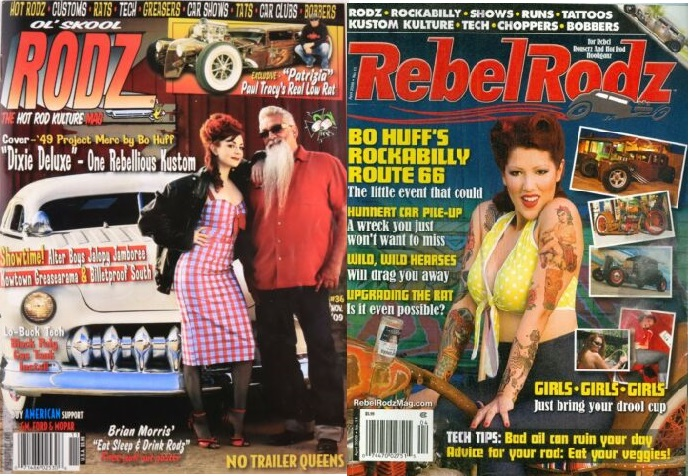
Bo Huff was frequently featured in popular rat rod and customs magazines

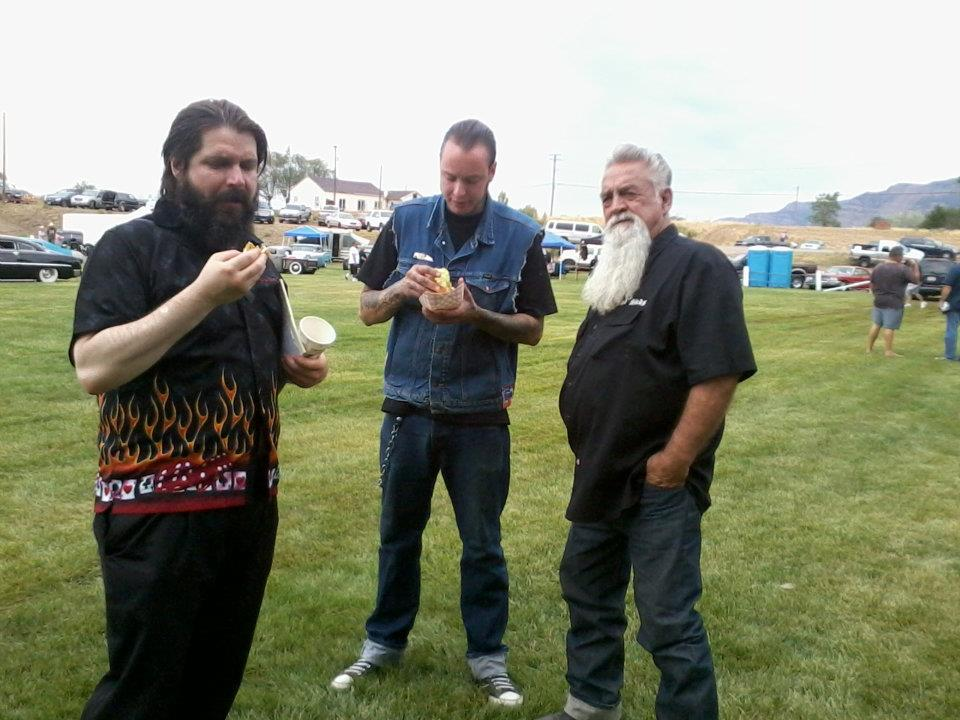
2012 Bo Huff Rockabilly Car Show, East Carbon, Utah – Jason "Dante" Laurvick, Chance Fisher & Bo Huff

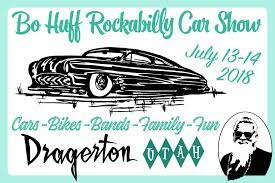
Flyer for annual Bo Huff car show, featuring the tail-dragger car style of Huff's youth and the town name "Dragerton" that he insisted on upholding

== Career ==
By the 1970s, Huff had learned automobile body and fender work at a training institute in Denver, Colorado, and had become friends with Stan Robles, a mentee of the renowned George Barris who had customized the Batmobile and the cars for The Munsters sitcom in the 1960s. Huff soon found work in Salt Lake City, and then opened his own custom paint shop in Orange County, California, a few years later.

Huff spent some time in the 1970s touring the custom car scene around the United States, and then opened a custom car shop in Lincoln, Arkansas. He later returned to Carbon County, Utah, and worked a brief stint in the same coalmines where his father had worked. Unhappy with this type of employment, Huff soon opened what became his permanent custom car shop in Sunnyside, Utah.

In the late 1990s, Huff began organizing his own car shows on a regular basis. He became the annual host of the following shows, among others: The Bo Huff Rockabilly Reunion in East Carbon, Utah, the Rockabilly Route 66 Car Show, and the Rockabilly Extravaganza in Riverside, California. Huff himself was the winner of the esteemed Grand National Roadster Show and achieved widespread recognition for his fabrication and custom paint skills.

SLUG Magazine's James Orme wrote the following about Bo Huff's work:

To call a Bo Huff custom a "car" would be like calling Van Gogh's Starry Night some swirls of paint. His finished products are rolling works of art. They seem to be the reason that the term "hot rod" was created. ... Bo Huff has worked with clients and sold cars all over the world, shipping them as far as Japan.

Street Muscle Magazine wrote that Bo Huff's "clients' rides would be nosed, decked, shaved, etc. and he was a master at putting on metal flake paint jobs." Huff became recognized worldwide for his custom cars, which were featured in custom car magazines such as Car Kulture Deluxe, Hot Rod Mechanic, Ol' Skool Rodz, Rod and Custom, and Street Rodder, among others.

== Later life and legacy ==
With his long silver beard, slick fashion, and candid communications style, Bo Huff became a familiar figure across the American West for his dedication to promoting Kustom Kulture lifestyle and the 1950s rockabilly spirit. Over the years, he also fathered seven children.

Huff worked on hundreds of cars over the course of his long career—strictly focusing on those produced from the 1930s to 1950s—and he also had several decades-long projects that he continued to perfect until the end of his life, including a 1936 Ford and a 1939 Mercury. He died in East Carbon, Utah, on August 4, 2015, after a five-year battle with multiple myeloma cancer, just a month before his Dead Sleds car club 10-year anniversary car show. In the final years of his life, he had become the subject of the film Bo Huff: A Documentary of His Life Cars, Music, and Girls, which was released the year after his death. He also appears in the 2020 documentary Bombshells and Dollies.

Huff was inducted into the National Rod and Custom Car Hall of Fame, the Kustom Kemps Hall of Fame, and the Customs of America Hall of Fame for his life's work. In addition to the Huffarama Car Show in Ontario, California, the annual Bo Huff Rockabilly Car Show continues to be held in Sunnyside, Utah, and Bo Huff's garage has become Carbon County, Utah's Bo Huff Museum, where the public can view his classic car collection and custom detailing. Huff's son, Junior Huff, has inherited the Bo Huff Customs business and has cultivated his own skills as an award-winning pin-striper.
