= Rat Fink =

Fictional character created by Ed Roth

- R.F.
- First appearance: 1963
- Created by: Ed "Big Daddy" Roth

In-universe information
- Gender: Male
- Occupation: Biker
- Nationality: American

Rat Fink (Note: The term fink is underworld slang for an informer. It derives from the German word for "finch" — i.e. one who "sings" — and is comparable to a stool pigeon. Ratfink is an intensified version of fink. By the time Roth adopted the name for his character, the term had started to pass into the vernacular, and expanded to mean an asshole generally, as well as an informer.) is a fictional rat created by American artist Ed "Big Daddy" Roth, one of the originators of Kustom Kulture, a subculture of hot rod automobile enthusiasts.

== History ==
Roth conceived of Rat Fink as an antithesis of Mickey Mouse. Rat Fink is usually portrayed as either green or gray, comically grotesque and depraved-looking with bulging, bloodshot eyes, an oversized mouth with sharp, narrow teeth, and wearing red overalls with the initials "R.F." on them. He is often seen driving cars or motorcycles.

Roth began airbrushing and selling "weirdo" T-shirts at car shows and in the pages of hot rod publications such as Car Craft in the late 1950s. By the August 1959 issue of Car Craft, "weirdo shirts" had become a craze, with Ed Roth at the forefront of the movement. His T-shirt designs inspired an industry.

Rat Fink was advertised for the first time in the July 1963 issue of Car Craft. The ad called it "The rage in California". Also in 1963, the Revell Model Company issued a plastic model kit of the character. The initial run of the kit was from 1963 to 1965, but the Rat Fink kit, along with Roth's other creations, has been re-issued by Revell over the years. Rat Fink continues to be a popular item to this day in hot rod and Kustom Kulture circles in the form of T-shirts, key chains, wallets, toys, decals, etc.

Other artists associated with Roth also drew the character, including Rat Fink Comix artist R. K. Sloane and Steve Fiorilla, who illustrated Roth's catalogs. Rat Fink and Roth are featured in Ron Mann's documentary film Tales of the Rat Fink (2006). Jeannette Catsoulis reviewed in The New York Times:

Ogling fins and drooling over fenders, the movie traces the colorful history of the hot rod from speed machine to babe magnet and, finally, museum piece and collector's item. Along the way we learn of Mr. Roth's lucrative idea to paint hideous monsters—including the Rat Fink of the title—on children's T-shirts.

== Revival ==
A Rat Fink revival in the late 1980s and the 1990s centered on the grunge/punk rock movements, both in the U.S. West Coast and in Australia (Roth drew Rat Fink artwork for the album Junk Yard by the Australian band The Birthday Party). The band White Zombie produced a song titled "Ratfinks, Suicide Tanks, and Cannibal Girls". The song was featured in the film Beavis and Butt-Head Do America, along with an animated sequence reminiscent of Ed Roth's artistic style.
