= Theatre Bizarre =

Annual event

- The main stage and midway of Theatre Bizarre, Detroit, Michigan
- Genre: Masquerade
- Date: Late October
- Begins: 7pm
- Ends: sunrise
- Frequency: Annual
- Locations: 967 W. State Fair Road, Detroit, MI (1999–2009); The Fillmore Detroit (2010); Detroit Masonic Temple (2011).
- Years active: 27
- Attendance: 2500
- Website: theatrebizarre.com

Theatre Bizarre is an annual Halloween masquerade staged at the Detroit Masonic Temple. The event takes up eight of the building's sixteen floors. The performers include local and national music acts, burlesque dancers, suspension artists and sideshow "freaks". Included in the national acts that have played at Theatre Bizarre are The Enigma, Mucca Pazza and winner of the 2010 Miss Exotic World Pageant, Roxi Dlite.

== History ==
In 1999, John Dunivant was ejected from Detroit's Russell Industrial Center, where he'd held studio space and staged a large Halloween party each year. He and Ken Poirier, who owned several properties just south of the Michigan State Fairgrounds, laid the groundwork for what would eventually become Theatre Bizarre.

Since that time, the grounds have played host to multiple masquerades and other public events as well as serving as the backdrop for several independent films and the music video for King Gordy's Nightmares.

In 2010, the city of Detroit moved to close down the grounds, based on a variety of zoning violations, causing the event and its 2500 attendees to be moved at the last minute to the Fillmore Theater (formerly The State Theater). A documentary film of the Theatre and its history is currently in production.

In June 2011, The Kresge Foundation named John Dunivant as one of its 2011 Visual Arts Fellows.

Since 2011, Theatre Bizarre has been held in the Detroit Masonic Temple, the largest building of its kind in the world, allowing for an attendance of up to 5000 partygoers.

Theatre Bizarre was canceled in 2020 and 2021 due to the COVID-19 pandemic. It returned in 2022. It was again canceled in 2023 due to a double booking of the Detroit Masonic Temple venue by AEG Presents.
