= Stupid Teenagers Must Die! =

- Stupid Teenagers Must Die! movie poster
- Directed by: Jeff C. Smith
- Written by: Curtis Andersen; Jeff C. Smith
- Produced by: Curtis Andersen; Sara Parrell; Wayne Watson
- Starring: Jovan Meredith; Ashley Schneider; Devin Marble; Lindsay Gareth; Renee Dorian; Cory Assink; Jonathan Brett; Will Deutsch; Jamie Carson; Christina DeRosa
- Cinematography: Jeff C. Smith
- Edited by: Jeff C. Smith
- Music by: Randy Catiller; Chris Dingman; John Draisey
- Production companies: Wiggy VonSchtick, Off Set Pictures
- Distributed by: Vanguard Cinema, Singa Home Entertainment
- Release dates: October 14, 2006 (Movie Nation Festival); September 25, 2007 (United States)
- Running time: 80 minutes
- Country: United States
- Language: English

Stupid Teenagers Must Die! is a 2006 spoof film directed by Jeff C. Smith and written by Smith and Curtis Andersen. During production and initial festival screenings, the film was originally titled Blood & Guts, but was changed before being sent for distribution.

== Plot ==
The story revolves around a group of teens who meet in a haunted house to hold a seance. The characters include a Kane (Jovan Meredith), a naive girlfriend (Ashley Schneider / Aurora Sta. Maria), a goth girl (Renee Dorian), a tough guy (Devin Marble), a ditzy blonde girl (Lindsay Gareth), a shy geek in love with the blonde (Matt Blashaw), two big nerds (Cory Assink & Jonathan Brett), and a pair of lipstick lesbians (Jamie Carson & Christina DeRosa). The characters encounter strange phenomena as they enter the house, including nudity, pitfalls, and even deaths, and Kane works to save the group before every teenager is dead.

== Development ==
In an early interview with Unbound, director Jeff C. Smith revealed that he and co-producers Sara Parrell and Curtis Andersen, as well as actor Jovan Meredith, worked together in the Entertainment division at Disneyland in Anaheim, California. Smith shared that it was during their employment at the park and collaboration on an earlier project that he saw Meredith's acting kills. Before the film entered post-production, the crew had scheduled its premiere as Blood & Guts at Cinespace in Hollywood, California, for July 13, 2006. However, the film was not ready, and director Smith screened the incomplete rough-cut he did have as a test screening, which the audience panned, causing Smith to then spend the next several months finishing the film's editing in preparation for its subsequent screenings.

== Cast ==
- Jovan Meredith as Kane
- Ashley Schneider as Julie
- Devin Marble as Alfie
- Lindsay Gareth as Tiffany
- Renee Dorian as Madeline
- Cory Assink as Geek One
- Jonathan Brett as Geek Two
- Will Deutsch as Ryan
- Jamie Carson as Sissy
- Christina DeRosa as Jamie
- Matt Blashaw as Michael
- Aurora Sta. Maria as Soup

== Reception ==
Intended by the director to appeal to "movie geeks", the film has received mixed responses from genre reviewers. Dorkgasm senior staff writer Kenneth Holm recommends it as an "exercise for other budding filmmakers to see what missteps to avoid when making their first movie." Conversely, the reviewer for Dead Lantern states that it is a "comedy that will make even the most jaded horror elitists smile." Fatally Yours called it a "film that knows how to have a good time!" in a review that acclaimed the film as "one of the most fun and enjoyable low-budget films I’ve seen in quite some time;" however, a reviewer for The Movies Made Me Do It decided that for a film that touts itself as a low-budget spoof, the filmmakers took the film too seriously, leading to them "basically creating a slasher film from the eighties minus the things that made those movies so appealing in the first place: massive body counts, T&A, and a neat villain for the heroes to contend with", concluding that "It's never even remotely scary" and "it's simply not funny either save for a couple of one-liners." The film had a major write-up in the October 2007 issue of Fangoria magazine.

== Release ==
The completed film was first screened on October 14, 2006, at the Movie Nation Festival and then shown at many additional festivals. Among the screenings was the Backseat Film Festival, where the film won Best Film Title and actress Lindsay Gareth won the prestigious "Best Breasts" award. It was offered for release on DVD in the United States by Vanguard International Cinema and internationally by Singa Home Entertainment on September 25, 2007. Three weeks prior to the DVD release, director Smith shared that the distributor allowed them a maximum of 125 minutes on the DVD, so he had chosen to include a 30-minute "making of" documentary titled Movies Are Bullshit! The Making Of Stupid Teenagers Must Die!, with commentary by director Jeff C. Smith and actor Jovan Meredith, an audience reaction track from the premiere, and an interview with cast member Will Deutsch.
