= Rat Rod Rockers! =

- film poster
- Directed by: D.A. Sebasstian
- Written by: D.A. Sebasstian
- Produced by: D.A. Sebasstian
- Starring: Teri Aslett; Hot Rod Heidi; Aeon Black
- Cinematography: D.A. Sebasstian
- Edited by: D.A. Sebasstian
- Production company: Go-Kustom Films
- Distributed by: Go-Kustom Films
- Release date: November 11, 2010
- Running time: 83 minutes
- Country: United States
- Language: English

Rat Rod Rockers! is a 2010 B-Movie written and directed by D.A. Sebasstian.

== Plot ==
The story begins when an area moonshiner named Old Man Kanker, dies mysteriously in a still explosion. A dysfunctional Seattlite family, the Milldues (Teri Aslett, Hot Rod Heidi, Aeon Black and Ivy Sawdon), buy the home not knowing that millions of dollars in moonshine money are buried somewhere on the premises. Ivan Molotov (Kerry Murphy), the local Russian Mob Boss, sends a gang of his thugs to retrieve the money. When the gang runs into serious resistance from the new home owners- all hell breaks loose. The violence escalates as the family refuses to budge or let the Rat Rod Gang on their property. The film features car chases, drag racing, kidnappings, and shoot outs, but all with a darkly humorous campy tone.

== Cast ==
- Teri Aslett as Danielle Milldue
- Hot Rod Heidi as Ruby Milldue
- Aeon Black as Harold Milldue
- Ivy Sawdon as Stephanie Milldue
- Kerry Murphy as Ivan Molotov
- Cameron Black as Jimmy Knight
- Charles Kittay as Rico Havana
- Red Rocket as Danika Molotov
- Tony Ririe as Dutch Von Henry
- Ron Foreman as Gil DeTomaso
- D.A. Sebasstian as Dmitri Cameo
- Becky Lee as Veronika Lakester
- Big Tom McDonald as Big Jake
- Lance Lambert as Officer Treacher
- Steve Puvogel as Officer Dumdown
- Trixie Lane as Hazel Tangiers

== Production ==
D.A. Sebasstian began filming May 2009 with filming complete by December 2009. Primary filming was done on a Panasonic AG-DVX100 with over 28 hours of raw footage shot on Digital Video in 24P mode (23.976 frames per second giving a film look). Locations included Edmonds, WA, Gold Bar, WA. and Monroe, WA. Editing and Post-Production took from January 2010 until the first screening of the film in November 2010.

== Release ==
Rat Rod Rockers! premiered at the Historic Everett Theater in Everett, Washington on November 13, 2010, to over 420 patrons. The films Seattle Premiere and DVD Release Party was March, 26th 2011 in Seattle, WA. at the King Cat Theater (official attendance was 351 persons). Shortly after the DVD release party, Rat Rod Rockers! was made available on multiple websites and stores including Amazon.com as both a DVD and Video On Demand rental. The film was screened April 2 & 3 2011 at the Mild To Wild Car Show in Puyallup, WA. and was also accepted into the 2011 Seattle's True Independent Film Festival (STIFF), where it drew a small audience. A Black & White Version of the film was released on DVD and paid download in July 2011. According to Sebasstian, he couldn't decide if he wanted the film to be in Color or Black & White so both versions were eventually released.

== Soundtrack ==
Original soundtrack by D.A. Sebasstian & The Inner Demons, featuring Paula Flava and Nikki Alonso. Incidental music by LG From The Bay/K4S Entertainment.

== Reception ==
Customer reviews have been very favorable with strong initial DVD sales for a micro indie-film with limited advertising. Rat Rod Rockers! was picked up in a non-exclusive deal by One World Studios distribution in July 2011.
