= CK Deluxe =

CK Deluxe (also known as Car Kulture Deluxe) is a magazine published by Brandon Elrod and Car Kulture Deluxe Media LLC Publications, featuring Kustom Culture lifestyles, Pin-Ups, Hot Rods, Customs, and Artwork. This magazine has a huge cult following in the US and along with Ol' Skool Rodz (also published by Koolhouse) are considered by many as good references for the Modern Car Kulture Enthusiast.

The magazine was established by Petersen Publishing, Inc. in 1999. It was first named Hot Rod DeLuxe. The magazine is based in Vero Beach, Florida. In 2006 its frequency was set to bimonthly.
