= Ol' Skool Rodz =

American custom car culture magazine

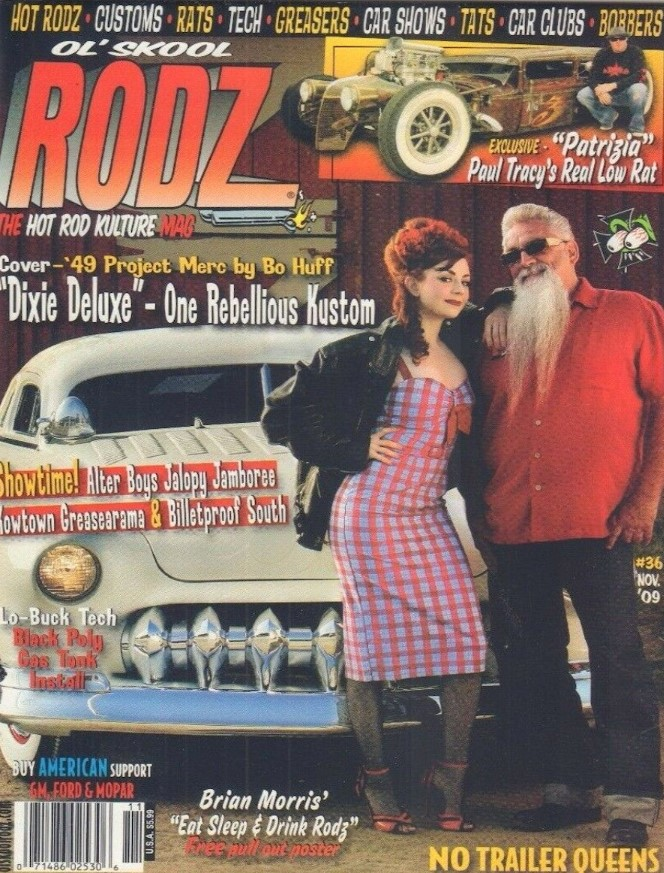
Cover from Ol Skool Rodz featuring custom car builder Bo Huff

Ol' Skool Rodz is a quarterly magazine It is published currently by Car Kulture Deluxe Media by Brandon Elrod, first by Geno DiPol and Koolhouse Publications, and then by Murphos Publishing. The magazine features topics such as Kustom Kulture lifestyles, pin-ups, custom cars, and artwork. Its articles are informative and include the history and current landscape of Kustom cars, hot rods and Kustom culture. It has documented the work of leading custom car builders such as Bo Huff. The publication is known for setting fashion and hairstyle trends in the Kustom Kulture scene. The magazine is based in Missouri. It has a widespread cult following in the Kustom Kulture scene and is considered (along with CK Deluxe) an authoritative view of this subculture's lifestyle.
