= Backseat Film Festival =

The Backseat Film Festival was an independent film festival organized by Doug Sakmann, Nick Esposito, and Zafer Ülkücü.

It began in Park City, Utah, in the winter of 2003 as one of many alternatives to the Sundance Film Festival (specifically around the time of Slamdance) and quickly became a touring festival based in Philadelphia, Pennsylvania. It operated for roughly seven years (with its main annual events held in Philadelphia through at least 2009).

During the summer of 2003, the festival partnered with the Vans Warped Tour. Its screening bus, the Dirty Erin, traveled through 44 cities across North America, screening films for tens of thousands of young people. Doug Sakmann (former Festival Director for the Troma Films' Tromadance Film Festival) shot the low-budget slasher film Punk Rock Holocaust (the first in a short series) on that tour; the project brought the festival international press attention.

The festival specialized in edgy, alternative indie films and toured U.S. cities with its selections.

== Featured films ==
- Punk Rock Holocaust
- Plaster Caster
- Automatons
- Stupid Teenagers Must Die!
- Fudge 44
- Prison-A-Go-Go!
- God Squad!
- Stupid Teenagers Must Die
- FUBAR: The Movie
- Razor Sharp
- Gimme Skelter
- The Making of The Green Goblin's Last Stand
- Films by Rusty Nails
- Hot Rod Girls Save The World
