= Kustom Kulture =

American subculture

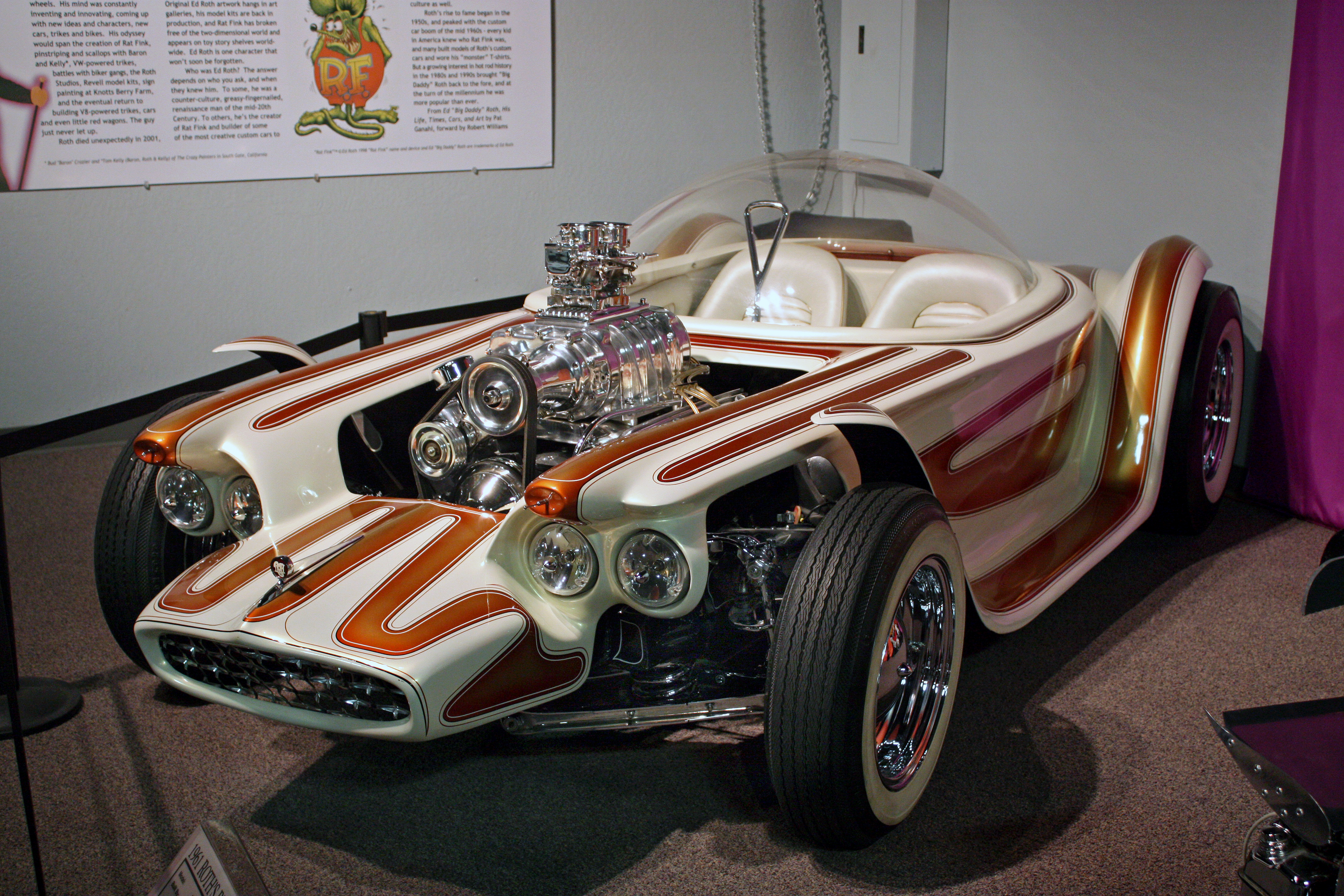
The Beatnik Bandit, built by Ed Roth, one of the most famous Kustom car builders

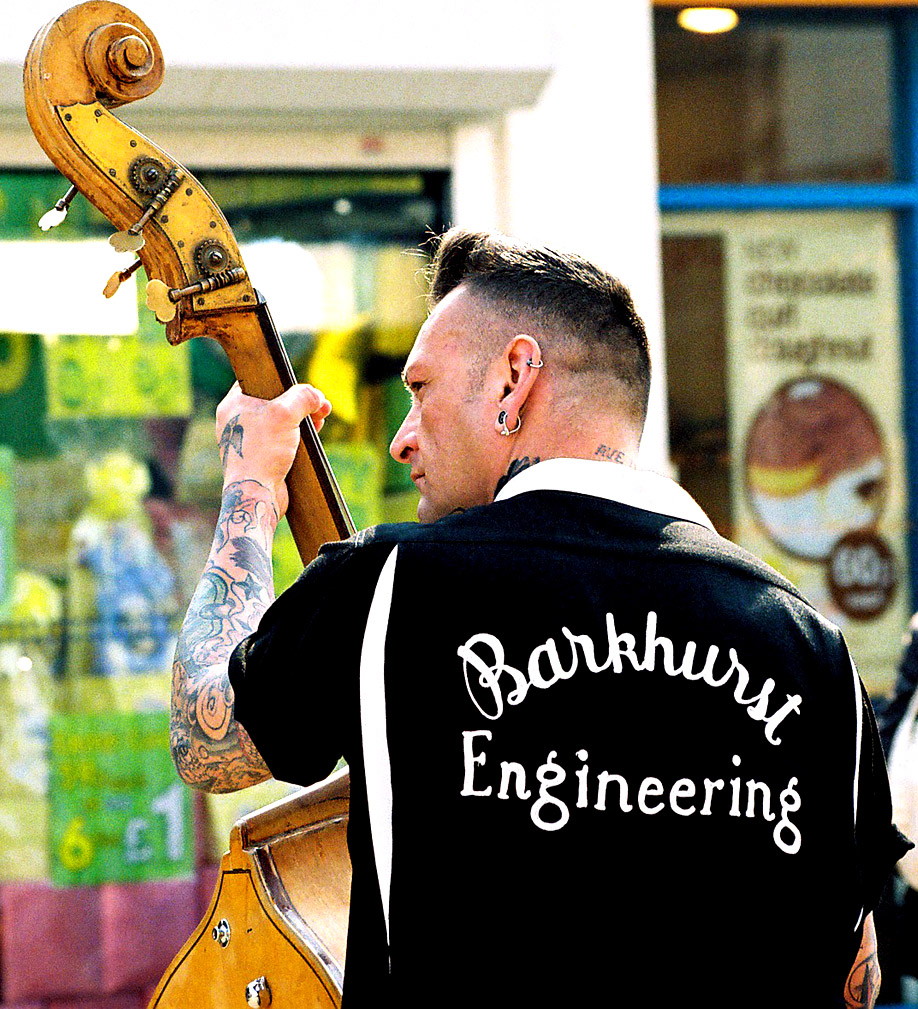

Kustom Kulture is the artworks, vehicles, hairstyles, and fashions of those who have driven and built custom cars and motorcycles in the United States of America from the 1950s through today. It was born out of the hot rod culture of Southern California of the 1960s.

In the early days of hot rodding, many fashions and styles developed. Over time, each of these distinct styles of customizing have blended together and reshaped American culture. Artists such as Von Dutch (Kenny Howard), Robert Williams, and custom car builder Ed "Big Daddy" Roth; along with Lyle Fisk, Dean Jeffries; hot rod and lowrider customizers such as the Barris Brothers (Sam and George Barris); along with numerous tattoo artists, automobile painters, and movies and television shows such as American Graffiti and The Munsters (The Munster Koach, DRAG-U-LA) have all helped to form what is known as Kustom Kulture.

Kustom Kulture is usually identified with the greasers of the 1950s, the drag racers of the 1960s, and the lowriders of the 1970s. Other subcultures that have had an influence on Kustom Kulture are the Skinheads, mods and rockers of the 1960s, the punk rockers of the 1970s, the metal and rockabilly music, along with the scooterboys of the 1980s, and psychobilly of the 1990s. Each separate culture has added their own customizations to the cars, their own fashions, influenced the music, and added their own ideas of what is cool, what is acceptable, and what is not. Everything from wild pinstriped paintjobs, to choptop Mercurys, to custom Harley-Davidson and Triumph motorcycles, to metal-flake and black primer paint jobs, along with music, cartoons, and monster movies have influenced what defines anyone and anything who is part of this automobile subculture.

In the 1990s and 2000s, Kustom Kulture had taken on a rebirth of American subcultures from the 1950s and 1960s with DIY activities. Each style is distinct, and has its roots in American automobile history. Many styles that would not have tolerated each other in the past now come together in large car shows.

== Kustom Graphics ==
The rebirth of Kustom Kulture has seen the use of the term “Kustom Graphics” to describe the style of artwork associated with the subculture when applied to posters, flyers, T-shirts and logos.

== Sweden, Norway and Finland ==
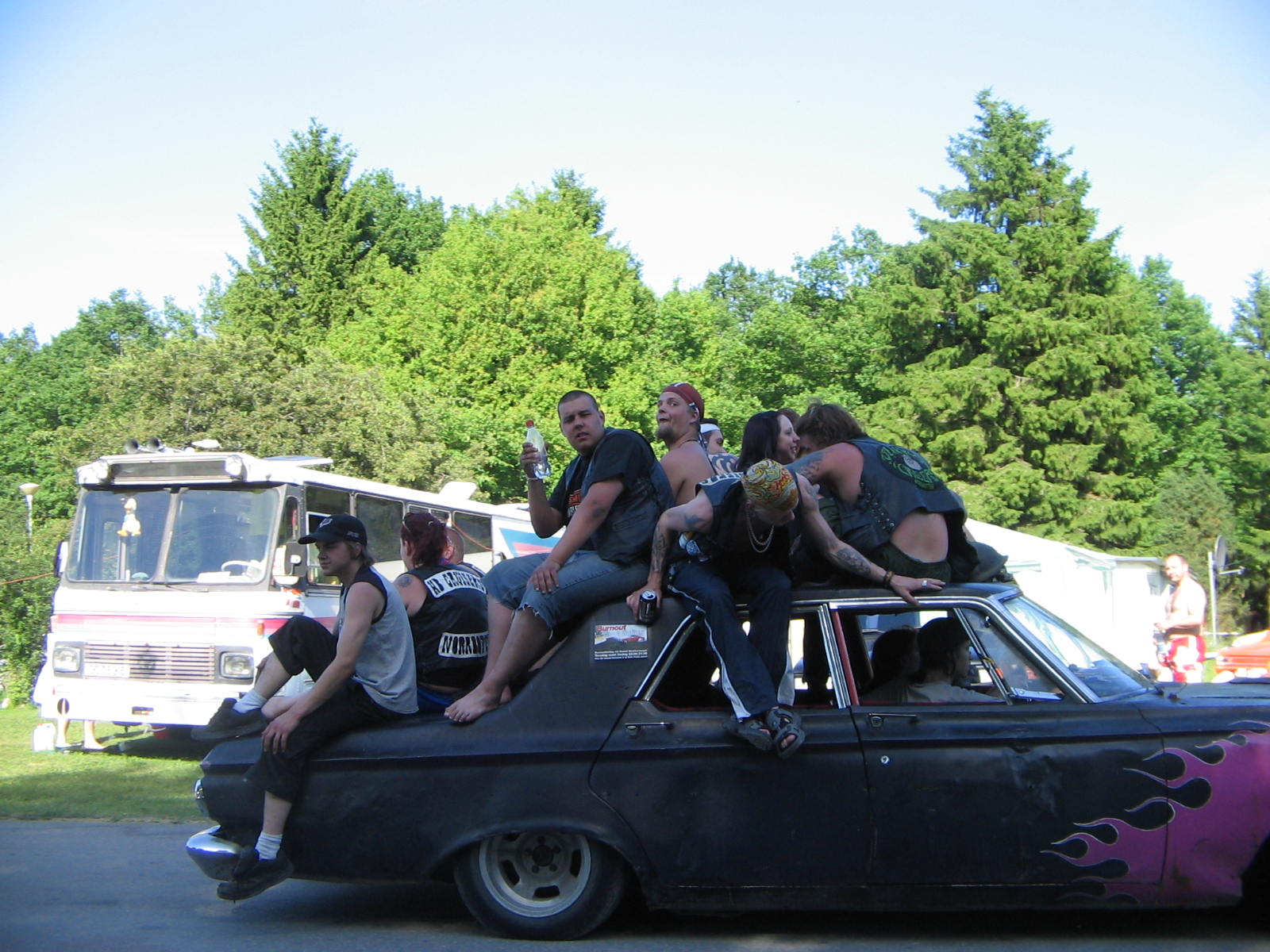
Swedish "raggare" with a 1960s American car at Power Big Meet

Locals in these countries, influenced by American culture, have created a local hot rod culture which is vibrant in Sweden, Norway and Finland where enthusiasts gather at meetings such as Power Big Meet and clubs like Wheels and Wings in Varberg, Sweden have established themselves in Hot Rod culture. Since there is very little "vintage tin" the hot rods in Sweden are generally made with a home made chassis (usually a Model T or A replica), with a Jaguar (or Volvo 240) rear axle, a small block V8, and fiberglass tub, but some have been built using for instance a Volvo Duett chassis. Because the Swedish regulations required a crash test even for custom-built passenger cars between 1969 and 1982, the Duett option was preferred, since it was considered a rebodied Duett rather than a new vehicle.

Some 1950s and 1960s cars are also hot rodded, like Morris Minor, Ford Anglia, Volvo Amazon, Ford Cortina, '57 Chevy, to name but a few. These are known as custom cars (sometimes spelled Kustom).

== See also ==
- Kustom (cars)
- Custom car
- Hot rod
- Rat rod
- Raggare
- Psychobilly
- Rockabilly
- Lowbrow (art movement)
- Kenny Howard (Von Dutch)
- Ed Roth
- Robert Williams
- George Barris
- Bo Huff
- Rat Fink
