= Beatnik Bandit =

Custom car created in 1961

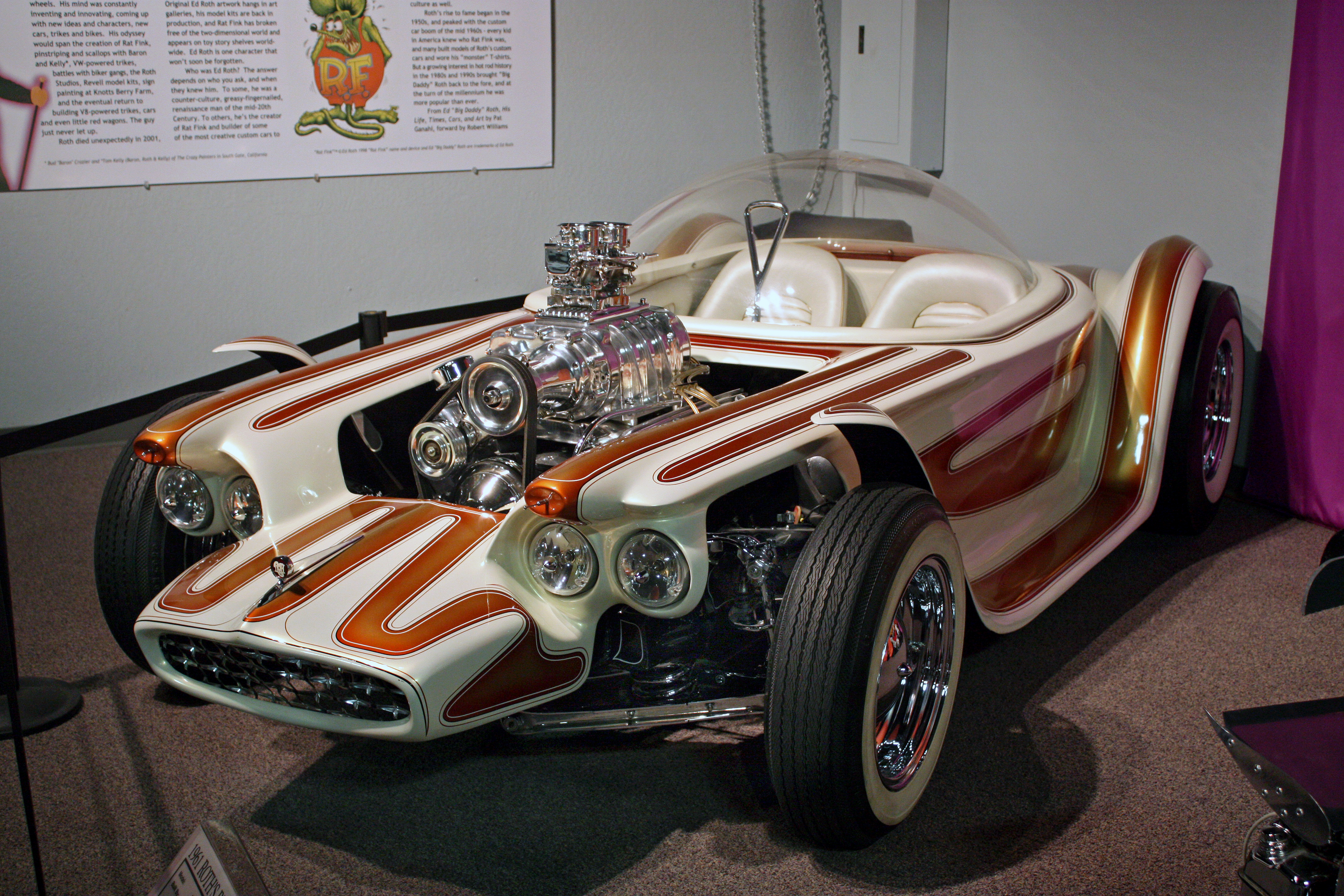
Beatnik Bandit at the National Automobile Museum, Reno, Nevada

The Beatnik Bandit is a custom car created in 1961 by Ed "Big Daddy" Roth. The car features a clear bubble canopy. Speed and direction are controlled by a central joystick in the cabin.

== History ==
The car originally appeared as a sketch in a project for Rod & Custom magazine called "The Grapes of Roth". This early design, featuring a tall T-type roof, was drawn by Joe Henning without much input from Roth. There are at least two stories for the origin of the car's name. One is that Roth approached Henning with the idea for the car and asked him "What am I going to call it?", to which Henning replied "You've got the Outlaw. Why not call this one the Beatnik Bandit?" Another version is that Roth read a news story about a bank robber nicknamed "the Beatnik Bandit" and decided to adopt the label for his car.

When Roth began building the Bandit both the design and car went through a series of changes, including the addition of the bubble top that was inspired by the glass of the DiDia 150. At first Roth tried to adapt a canopy salvaged from a B-36 bomber to the car but was unsuccessful, so a custom plexiglas canopy was made. Roth claimed that he produced the part himself in a pizza oven by blowing the plastic sheet up like a balloon, but it is believed that it was actually produced by Acry Plastics in Los Angeles, who had produced similar parts for Ron Aguirre.

Construction of the car consumed 2,000 lb (907.2 kg) of plaster, 42 yd (38.4 m) of fiberglass cloth, and 50 US gal (189.3 L) of resin. Much of the work preparing the body was done by Doug "Dirty Doug" Kinney. Many have speculated as to whether Roth made a mold of the body. Pictures in a magazine article seem to hint at the existence of one but no such molds have ever been found. The car was painted at Larry Watson's Watson's House of Style, where Roth traded the paint work for a supply of Rat Fink T-shirts.

The Bandit was featured on the cover of the May 1961 edition of Car Craft magazine. It was also the subject of an article titled “Bandit at Large” in the July 1961 issue of Rod & Custom magazine. Retrospectives of the car appeared in the 1991 issue of Rod & Custom and the March 2002 issue of Custom Rodder.

Roth trailered the Bandit around the US to various car shows, towing it with a Cadillac hearse that he lived out of. At shows Roth used a remote control that plugged into the Bandit on a long cord to remotely start the engine, turn the wheels and raise and lower the canopy. Roth sold both the Beatnik Bandit and the Outlaw to Bob Larivee, who continued to show the cars until around 1963. Larivee traded both cars back to Roth in exchange for the Mysterion. Roth then leased the Bandit to Ray Farhner who had the car painted a metallic green. Jim Brucker bought the car from Roth for $50 in 1970 and displayed it in his Movieland Cars of the Stars museum. Harrah's Automobile Collection eventually acquired all of Brucker's Roth cars, including the Bandit. In 1985 the car was restored to its original condition and since then has been on permanent display at the National Automobile Museum in Reno, Nevada.

In 1995 Roth unveiled the Beatnik Bandit II. This successor to the 1961 Bandit featured many styling cues from the earlier car but was powered by a fuel injected 350 cu in (5.7 L) Chevrolet LT-4 engine.

== Features ==
The Beatnik Bandit is built on a shortened Oldsmobile chassis. While one source says that it was of 1955 vintage, most believe that the chassis actually dates from 1950. The front suspension is independent with kingpins and A-arms and in the back is a solid axle with trailing arms. Coil springs are used at all four corners. The original wheels were chromed reverse steel with baby moon hubcaps.

Power comes from a 303 cu in (5.0 L) Oldsmobile V8 engine fitted with twin Ford carbs and a GMC 4-71 supercharger courtesy of Bell Auto Parts. The engine was built by Fritz Voight. There is extensive use of chrome plating, including most of the exposed engine and all of the front suspension parts. The transmission is a 4-speed Hydramatic automatic unit.

The Bandit does not have a traditional steering wheel or floor pedals. Steering, throttle, transmission, and braking are all controlled by a chrome-plated joystick mounted on the center tunnel. The steering linkage is driven by a hydraulic ram. There is a single large round gauge in the middle of the dashboard. Upholstery was done by Eddie Martinez.

The Plexiglas canopy, which doubles as a roof and door, is hinged at the front. It is raised and lowered by convertible top rams that are operated by pressing on an antenna mounted on the fender.

== Scale models ==
Revell signed a contract with Roth to develop kits for them in 1961. Revell issued a 1/25 scale model of the Beatnik Bandit developed by Roth working with Jim Keeler in 1963 and reissued it in 1994.

In the late 1960s toy company Mattel contacted Roth about making a small die-cast car based on his design. Designer Harry Bentley Bradley developed a 1/64 scale version of the Bandit. When the Hot Wheels line was launched in 1968 the Beatnik Bandit was one of the "Sweet 16" original 16 Hot Wheels designs. Mattel issued a 10,000-unit special edition in 2001, just months after Roth's death. They also released a larger 1/18 scale version.
