= Galpin Auto Sports =

American automobile dealership and repair shop

- Type: Spare Parts Shop and Automotive Company
- Industry: Automobile
- Founded: San Fernando, California, 1946
- Founder: Frank Galpin
- Headquarters: Van Nuys region of Los Angeles
- Area served: United States
- Key people: Beau Boeckmann, President
- Revenue: Over $700,000,000
- Website: galpinautosports.com

Galpin Auto Sports (or GAS) is an American custom car and automobile repair shop located in the Van Nuys region of Los Angeles, which specializes in customizing and remodeling vehicles specifically for their drivers. They also provide specialty parts and accessories. The shop was founded in 1946 by Frank Galpin and later purchased by Bert Boeckmann.

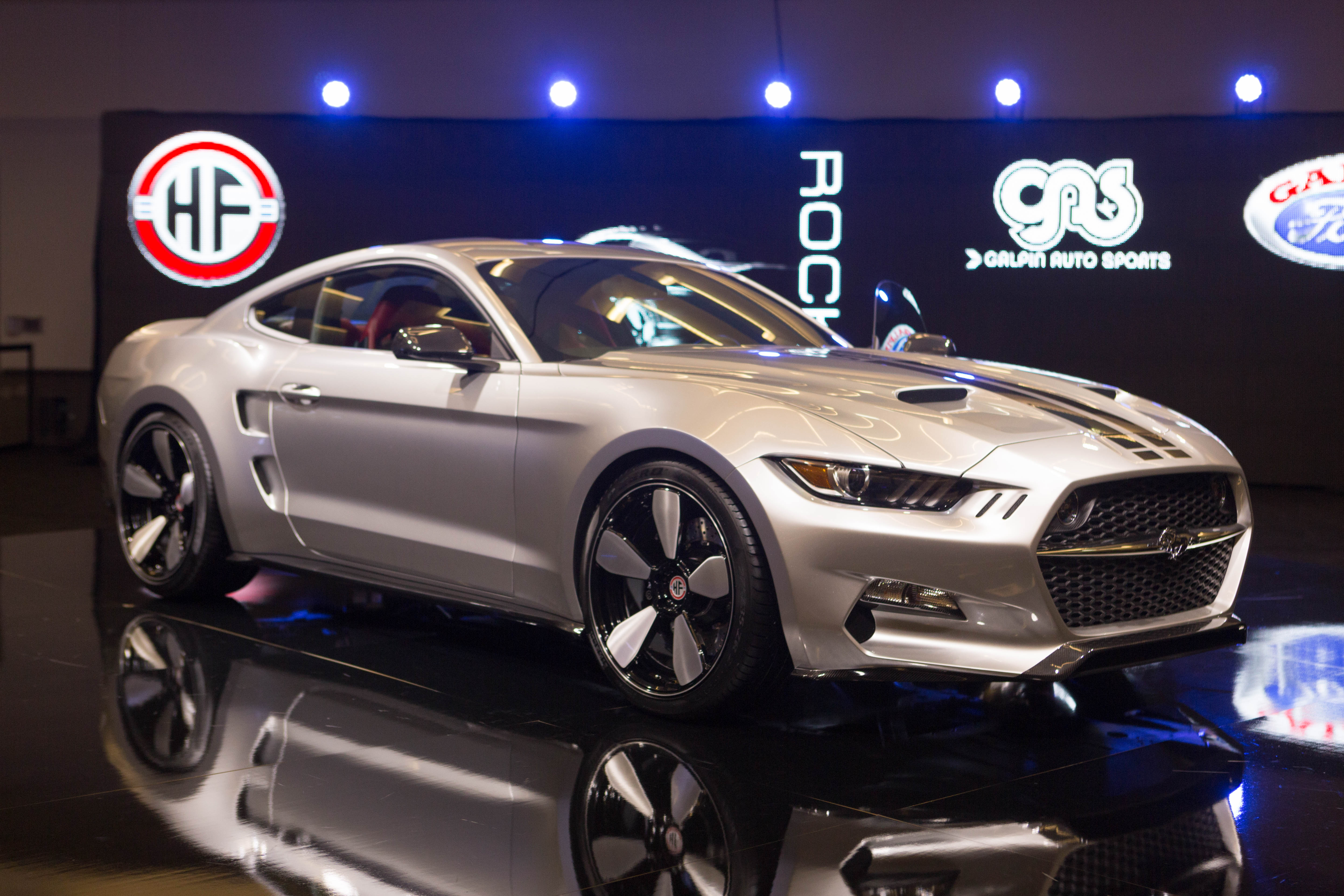
Galpin Rocket Mustang at the 2014 LA Auto Show

Galpin Auto Sports is the car garage featured on MTV's Pimp My Ride hosted by Xzibit. The show was moved from West Coast Customs to GAS in the 5th and 6th seasons. They also own a second-hand car shop. On site at the main garage is an extensive array of customized cars which can be bought direct from the garage.

GAS's work could also be seen on the 2008-2009 television show Knight Rider. They were asked to create the star of the show, a new version of the 2008 Ford Mustang called the GT500KR. "GAS had one week to create the new KITT, and they pulled out all the stops. Six people worked full time to create the Mustang that would be sent over to Picture Car Warehouse as the father of all the KITT derivatives and stunt cars."

"Galpinized" custom-designed vehicles have won awards at various shows.

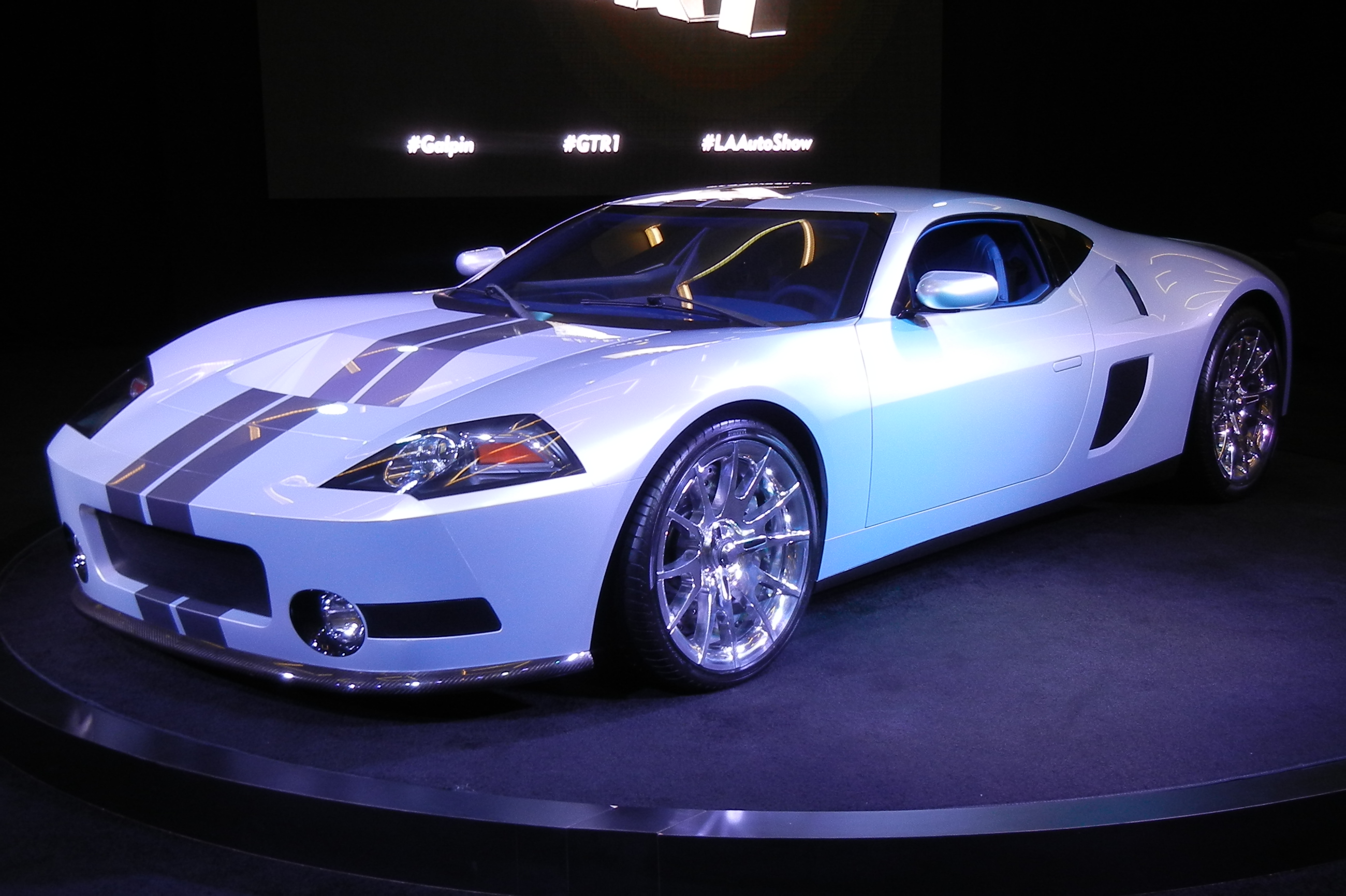
Galpin GTR1 at the 2013 LA Auto Show

== Galpin Motors ==
Galpin Auto Sports is part of Galpin Motors, Inc. which is the number one volume Ford Motor Company dealership in the world and one of the top California car dealerships with more than $700 million in annual sales. Other Galpin brands include Lincoln Motor Company, Mazda, Jaguar Cars, Land Rover, Volvo Cars, Aston Martin, Lotus Cars, Honda, Porsche, and Volkswagen.
