= List of The Munsters characters =

The following is a list of recurring characters in the CBS sitcom The Munsters and other related projects.

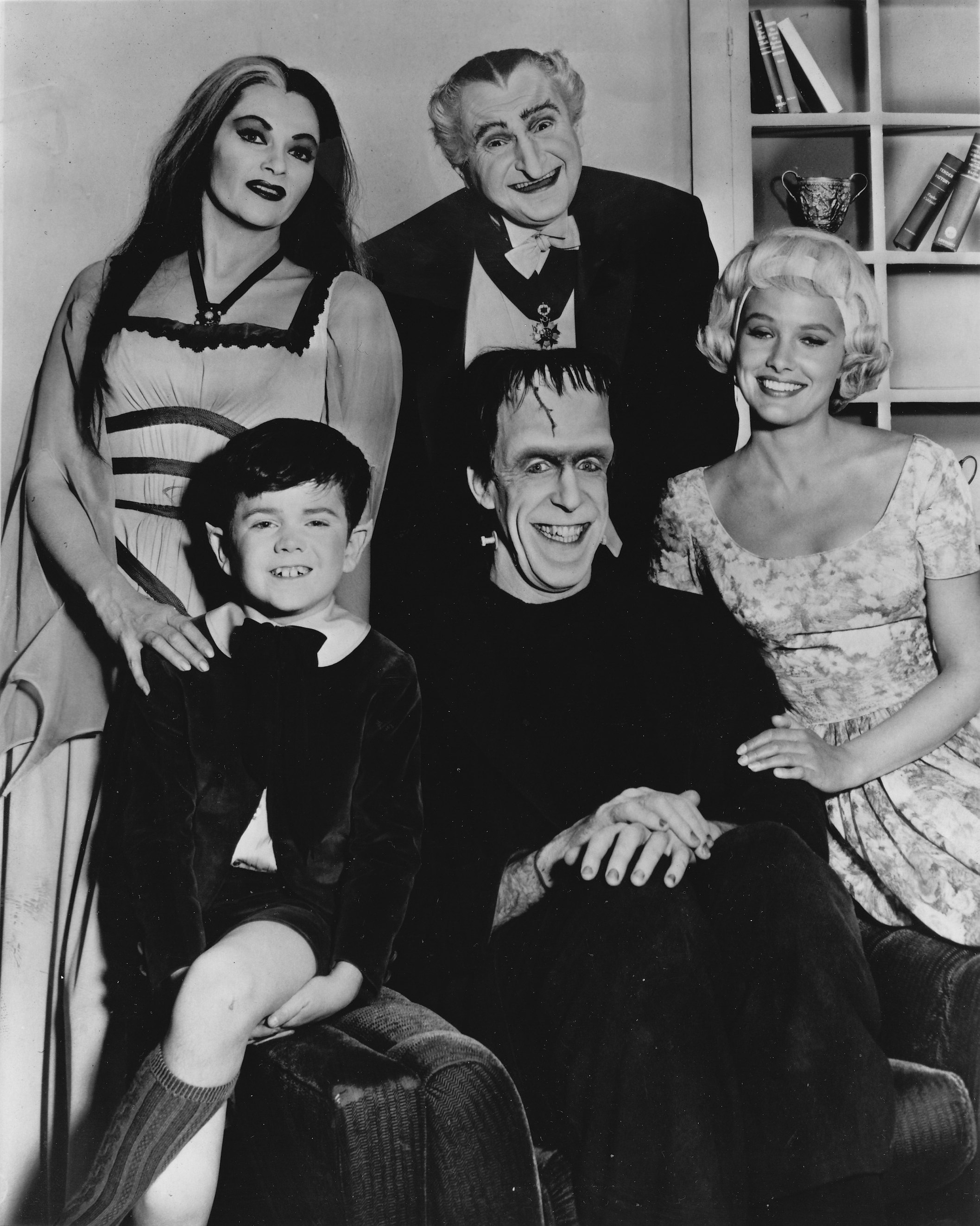
The cast of The Munsters. Standing, L–R: Yvonne De Carlo, Al Lewis. Sitting: Butch Patrick, Fred Gwynne, Beverley Owen

== The Munsters ==
Character	Actor/Actress
Herman Munster	Fred Gwynne (1960s series), John Schuck (1980s series), Jeff Daniel Phillips (2022 film)
Lily Munster	Yvonne De Carlo (1960s series), Lee Meriwether (1980s series), Sheri Moon Zombie (2022 film)
Grandpa	Al Lewis (1960s series), Howard Morton (1980s series), Daniel Roebuck (2022 film)
Eddie Munster	Butch Patrick (1960s series), Jason Marsden (1980s series)
Marilyn Munster	Beverley Owen (ep. 1–13, 1960s series), Pat Priest (ep. 14–70, 1960s series), Debbie Watson (Munster, Go Home!), Hilary Van Dyke (1980s series)
Phoebe Munster	Joan Marshall ("My Fair Munster" pilot 1st version)

== The Munsters' pets ==
- Igor - Grandpa's pet Transylvanian bat. In the 2022 film, Igor (portrayed by Sylvester McCoy) was originally a servant of the Count before he was turned into a bat so that he can travel to North America with them.
- Spot - A large fire-breathing reptile, whose lair is under the stairs. Spot chases cars, and sometimes catches them. When he leaves his lair, only his tail can usually be seen on screen. In the 13th episode of Season 2, "Underground Munster", Spot runs away and is mistaken for a dangerous monster when he is sighted in the sewer. Herman goes down the manhole to search for Spot but is also mistaken for a dangerous monster. In "The Munsters Today," Spot's presence in the show is usually depicted by his fire breath emerging from the entrance to his lair. Also in the show, Spot's tail was shown in a redesigned form. In the 2022 film, Spot was shown to be smaller and was found in the French sewers by Herman and Lily.
- Charlie the Raven (voiced by Mel Blanc and by Bob Hastings in the TV series, Fred Coury in the 2022 film) - A raven who lives in the Munsters' cuckoo clock and repeats the word "Nevermore." When the raven occasionally makes smart-aleck remarks, Herman throws objects at him. Sometimes, the raven will come out of his clock, but often only for short breaks or to flee when frightened.
- Kitty - A black cat that roars like a lion.

== Recurring characters ==
=== Dr. Dudley ===
Edward Howard Dudley, M.D., (portrayed by Paul Lynde in episodes 4, 6, and 19, Dom DeLuise in episode 55) is the Munsters' family doctor. Dr. Dudley is extremely nearsighted (and sometimes has his glasses off when examining Herman). His secretary and nurse is Ms. Fairchild (portrayed by Alice Backes). Dr. Dudley and his wife (portrayed by Marilyn Lovell) have a son named Elmer Dudley (portrayed by Peter Robbins) who is Eddie's playmate in episode 4, "Rock-a-Bye, Munster."

=== Mr. Gateman ===
Mr. Gateman (portrayed by John Carradine in the TV series, Jeremy Wheeler in the 2022 film) is the undertaker in charge of the Gateman, Goodbury, and Graves funeral home where Herman works.

In the 2022 film, Mr. Gateman was seen with Mr. Goodbury and Mr. Graves when they host a costume contest on Mockingbird Lane where they awarded the best costume prize to the Munsters. They also offer Herman a job when he says he is looking for employment.

=== Clyde Thornton ===
Clyde Thornton (portrayed by Chet Stratton) is Herman's co-worker at the funeral home. When first introduced, Clyde is continuously tricking and ridiculing Herman into one of his practical jokes until Herman finally stands up to him and Clyde gets caught in one of his own traps. After settling their differences, in "Cyrano De Munster", Clyde uses Herman's poems to woo the girl of his dreams. When she finds out that Clyde is not the one writing the poems, she rejects him and inquires about Herman. After finally seeing Herman, the girl screams and runs away. Angry at seeing his dream girl so frightened, Clyde punches Herman in the jaw and consequently breaks his own hand. Like most of Herman's co-workers, Clyde does not seem to notice anything unusual about Herman's appearance, although he is impressed (and intimidated) by Herman's super-strength.

=== Mrs. Cribbins ===
Mrs. Yolanda "Yo-yo" Cribbins (portrayed by Claire Carleton) is the Munsters' neighbor. In episode 2, "My Fair Munster," Mrs. Cribbins falls in love with Herman after he accidentally consumes a potion concocted by Grandpa; at the end of the episode she and the mailman Warren Bloom (portrayed by John Fiedler), who is also wary of the Munsters, accidentally consume the same potion and fall in love with each other.

=== Howie Buchanan ===
Howie Buchanan (portrayed by Richard Steven Horvitz) is a teenager exclusive to The Munsters Today who is best friends with Marilyn and is one of a few people who can tolerate the Munsters.

=== Dee Dee Nelson ===
Dee Dee Nelson (portrayed by Mary Cadorette) only appears in The Munsters Today. She is the wife of a plastic surgeon.

== Relatives ==
The following are the known relatives of the Munster family:

=== On the Munster side ===
- Charlie Munster (portrayed by Fred Gwynne) - Herman's twin brother. Conniving and a liar, he is into get-rich-quick schemes and often engages in scam artistry.
- Elsa Hyde (portrayed by Judy Gold) - Herman's sister and Marilyn's mother in Here Come The Munsters.
- Johann - Herman's "cousin". One of an unknown number of near misses before the successful creation of Herman and Charlie, survived in the Transylvanian woods for over 150 years, where he frightened young maidens. He was found by Dr. Frankenstein, who was the original's great-great-grandson who had control over him.
- Victor Frankenstein - A German scientist who created Herman. At Herman and Lily's wedding, Frankenstein gave Herman away "with his blueprints." He is currently dead.
- Victor Frankenstein IV (portrayed by John Abbott) - The great-great-grandson of Victor Frankenstein who appeared in "A Visit from Johann".
- Cousin Wolverine - The Munsters inherited money from him which they used in unsuccessful attempts to start businesses.
- Uncle Gilbert (portrayed by Richard Hale in the TV series, Renáta Kiss in the 2022 film) - Uncle Gilbert is the Creature from the Black Lagoon and once sent the Munsters $180,000 in gold doubloons. In the 2022 film, Uncle Gilbert is Lily Gruesella's uncle who she and Herman visited during the vacation that took place prior to their marriage.
- Frank Munster (portrayed by Peter Schuck) - Herman's brother in The Munsters Today.
- Lady Effigie Munster (portrayed by Hermione Gingold) - Herman Munster's evil aunt from England who sought to get rid of him and his family in order to acquire her late husband's inheritance. She first appeared in Munster, Go Home!
- Lord Cavanaugh Munster - Herman Munster's deceased adoptive uncle and father figure from England and an accomplished road racer. He first appeared in Munster, Go Home!
- Freddie Munster (portrayed by Terry-Thomas) - Herman Munster's evil cousin from England who sought to get rid of him and his family in order to acquire Lady Effigie Munster's late husband's inheritance. He first appeared in Munster, Go Home!
  - Grace Munster (portrayed by Jeanne Arnold) - Herman Munster's evil cousin from England who sought to get rid of him and his family in order to acquire Lady Effigie Munster's late husband's inheritance. She first appeared in Munster, Go Home!
  - Cruikshank (portrayed by John Carradine) - Freddie and Grace's evil butler from England who sought to get rid of him and his family in order to acquire Lady Effigie Munster's late husband's inheritance. He first appeared in Munster, Go Home!
- Henry Augustus Wolfgang (portrayed by Richard Brake) - In the 2022 film, Dr. Henry Augustus Wolfgang is a mad scientist who is responsible for the creation of Herman Munster. While he used the fingers of the zombie pianist Franz Pennywhacker after stabbing him in the head with his pickaxe, Wolfgang wanted to use the brain of astrophysicist Shelly Von Rathbone only to accidentally get the brain of his comedian brother Shecky Von Rathbone due to a mix-up by Floop. After seeing the mistake and briefly living in a leper colony in Zanzibar, Wolfgang was present at Herman's wedding to Lily Gruesella. Once Herman and Lily are married, Wolfgang states to the Count that Herman is his bloody problem now.
  - Floop (portrayed by Jorge Garcia) - Dr. Henry Augustus Wolfgang's hunchbacked assistant. He was responsible for the brain mix-up when it came to creating Herman and was also responsible for giving him the last name Munster. During Dr. Wolfgang's brief time in Zanzibar following the brain mix-up, Floop became Herman's manager when he became a big hit. Floop was also present during Herman's wedding to Lily.

=== On the Dracula side ===
- Katja Dracula (portrayed by Jo De Winter) - In The Munsters Today, she's Lily's mother and depicted as Grandpa's favorite (and final) wife. She is also a go-getter vampire. Katja left her daughter and husband when Lily was very young due to a "having to get away", but she came back, trying reconcile. Eventually, she left again before this could be official.
- Lester Dracula (portrayed by Irwin Charone in the TV series, Tomas Boykin in the 2022 film) - Lily's brother and a classy if not financially irresponsible werewolf.
- Uncle George - Grandpa's uncle who was hanged.
- Cousin Ronald - Grandpa's cousin.
- Cousin Phantom (portrayed by Bob Hastings) - Their cousin and the Phantom of the Opera who shatters glass with his voice. He appears in The Munsters' Revenge.
- Uncle Garrett and Aunt Mina - They were never depicted and were said to live in Death Valley.
- Uncle Boris - He was "a real swinger" according to Grandpa. At Christmas, he used to exchange bombs with Grigori Rasputin. A picture of him was found in the Munsters' family photo album.
- Cousin Humphrey - Cousin Humphrey is Grandpa's deceased, rotten cousin. He stole Grandpa's aspirin during the Black Plague. Cousin Humphrey was also a lousy piano player and is now a ghost.
- Lily's Grandma - She is Lily's unnamed grandmother who died for the umpteenth time in 1964 and left Lily an inheritance of $5,000.00.
- Great Grandmother Medusa - She is Lily's great-grandmother who was a famous cook back in her day. In The Munsters Today episode "Vampire Pie," Grandpa mentioned that nobody who tried her Transylvanian Surprise ever lived to regret it. It later turned out that Great Grandmother Medusa's Transylvanian Surprise also had bat milk (harvested from the bats in the Munsters' attic) which was the antidote to prevent anyone who ate Transylvanian Surprise from turning into ducks.
- Unseen Cousin - In one episode of The Munsters Today, Herman states that one of Lily's cousins is a mermaid.

=== Other relatives ===
In later adaptations of The Munsters, other relatives were provided:

- Leonard - Grandpa's long-time skeleton friend ever since college in medieval times. He appears in every episode of The Munsters Today.
- Aunt Elvira - A witch of uncertain connection to the family. In The Munsters' Revenge, Lily mentions that the family enjoys meeting her when her broom arrives at the airport. She is clearly not intended to be Elvira, Mistress of the Dark.
- Cousin Wolfgang - A cousin of the Munsters who is mentioned in the animated special The Mini-Munsters. He is the father of twins Igor and Lucretia (who do not look much alike).
  - Igor and Lucretia - Two teenage cousins of the Munsters who appear in The Mini-Munsters. They are the twin children of the Munsters' cousin Wolfgang. Igor is a Frankenstein-like entity like Herman and Lucretia is a blonde vampire. Along with Eddie (also a teenager in the special), they form a band called The Mini-Munsters.
- Clyde the Door Knocker (portrayed by Noel Ferrier) - A door knocker of the Munster Mansion who was shown in The Munsters' Scary Little Christmas. He speaks in the voice and mannerisms of a butler. Clyde is based on the ghost of Jacob Marley in A Christmas Carol, particularly the part where Marley's face briefly appears on Scrooge's door knocker.
