= List of Yvonne De Carlo performances =

List of media and stage plays featuring Yvonne De Carlo

This is the complete filmography of actress Yvonne De Carlo (September 1, 1922 – January 8, 2007).

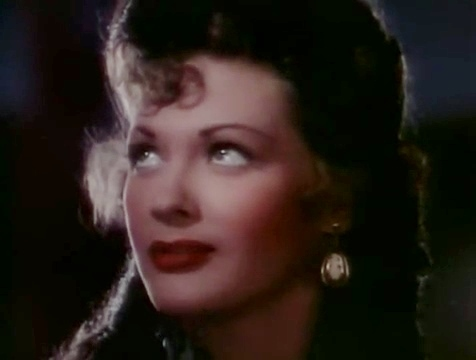
De Carlo portraying the title role in Salome, Where She Danced (1945)

== Film ==
| Year | Title | Role | Notes |
|---|---|---|---|
| 1941 | Harvard, Here I Come | Bathing Girl | Uncredited |
| 1942 | This Gun for Hire | Showgirl at Neptune Glub | Uncredited |
| 1942 | Youth on Parade | Student | Uncredited |
| 1942 | Road to Morocco | Handmaiden | Uncredited |
| 1942 | Lucky Jordan | Bit Role | Deleted scenes |
| 1942 | Rhythm Parade | Showgirl | Uncredited |
| 1943 | The Crystal Ball | Secretary | Deleted scenes |
| 1943 | Salute for Three | Left Brunette in Singing Quartette | Uncredited |
| 1943 | For Whom the Bell Tolls | Girl in Cafe | Uncredited |
| 1943 | Let's Face It | Chorus Girl | Uncredited |
| 1943 | So Proudly We Hail! | Girl | Uncredited |
| 1943 | Deerslayer | Princess Wah-Tah | |
| 1943 | True to Life | Bit Role | Uncredited |
| 1944 | Standing Room Only | Secretary | Uncredited |
| 1944 | The Story of Dr. Wassell | Native Girl | Uncredited |
| 1944 | Kismet | Handmaiden | Uncredited |
| 1944 | Rainbow Island | Lona's Companion | Uncredited |
| 1944 | Here Come the Waves | Wave | Uncredited |
| 1944 | Practically Yours | Office Clerk | Uncredited |
| 1945 | Bring on the Girls | Hatcheck Girl | Uncredited |
| 1945 | Salome, Where She Danced | Anna Maria "Salome" | |
| 1945 | Frontier Gal | Lorena Dumont | |
| 1947 | Song of Scheherazade | Cara de Talavera | |
| 1947 | Brute Force | Gina Ferrara | |
| 1947 | Slave Girl | Francesca | |
| 1948 | Black Bart | Lola Montez | |
| 1948 | Casbah | Inez | |
| 1948 | River Lady | Sequin | |
| 1949 | Criss Cross | Anna Dundee | |
| 1949 | Calamity Jane and Sam Bass | Calamity Jane | |
| 1949 | The Gal Who Took the West | Lillian Marlowe | |
| 1950 | Buccaneer's Girl | Deborah McCoy | |
| 1950 | The Desert Hawk | Princess Scheherazade | |
| 1951 | Tomahawk | Julie Madden | |
| 1951 | Hotel Sahara | Yasmin Pallas | |
| 1951 | Silver City | Candace Surrency | |
| 1951 | The San Francisco Story | Adelaide McCall | |
| 1952 | Scarlet Angel | Roxy McClanahan | |
| 1952 | Hurricane Smith | Luana Whitmore | |
| 1953 | Sea Devils | Droucette | |
| 1953 | Sombrero | Maria of the River Road | |
| 1953 | The Captain's Paradise | Nita St. James | |
| 1953 | Fort Algiers | Yvette | |
| 1954 | Border River | Carmelita Carias | |
| 1954 | Happy Ever After | Serena McGlusky | US title: Tonight's the Night |
| 1954 | La Contessa di Castiglione | Virginia Oldoini | |
| 1954 | Passion | Rosa Melo / Antonia 'Tonia' Melo | |
| 1955 | Shotgun | Abby | |
| 1955 | Flame of the Islands | Rosalind Dee | |
| 1956 | Magic Fire | Minna Planer | |
| 1956 | Raw Edge | Hannah Montgomery | |
| 1956 | The Ten Commandments | Sephora | |
| 1956 | Death of a Scoundrel | Bridget Kelly | |
| 1957 | Band of Angels | Amantha Starr | |
| 1958 | The Sword and the Cross | Mary Magdalene | |
| 1959 | Timbuktu | Natalie Dufort | |
| 1963 | McLintock! | Louise Warren | |
| 1964 | Law of the Lawless | Ellie Irish | |
| 1964 | A Global Affair | Dolores | |
| 1966 | Munster, Go Home! | Lily Munster | |
| 1967 | Hostile Guns | Laura Mannon | |
| 1968 | The Power | Mrs. Sally Hallson | |
| 1968 | Arizona Bushwhackers | Jill Wyler | |
| 1970 | The Delta Factor | Valerie | |
| 1971 | The Seven Minutes | Constance Cumberland | |
| 1974 | Arizona Slim | Countess Zubrovka | |
| 1975 | Blazing Stewardesses | Honey Morgan | |
| 1975 | It Seemed Like a Good Idea at the Time | Julia | |
| 1975 | The Intruder | DePriest | |
| 1976 | Won Ton Ton, the Dog Who Saved Hollywood | Cleaning Woman | |
| 1976 | La casa de las sombras | Mrs. Howard | |
| 1977 | Satan's Cheerleaders | Emmy / Sheriff's Wife / High Priestess | |
| 1979 | Nocturna: Granddaughter of Dracula | Jugulia Vein | |
| 1979 | Guyana: Cult of the Damned | Susan Ames | |
| 1979 | Fuego negro | Catherine Jones | |
| 1979 | Silent Scream | Mrs. Engels | |
| 1980 | The Man with Bogart's Face | Teresa Anastas | |
| 1981 | Liar's Moon | Jeanene Dubois | |
| 1981 | Play Dead | Hester | |
| 1985 | Flesh and Bullets | Judge in Los Angeles | |
| 1987 | Vultures | Rose | |
| 1988 | American Gothic | Ma | |
| 1988 | Cellar Dweller | Mrs. Briggs | |
| 1990 | Mirror, Mirror | Emelin | |
| 1991 | Oscar | Aunt Rosa | |
| 1992 | The Naked Truth | Mrs. Hess | Direct-to-video release |
| 1993 | Seasons of the Heart | Older Martha (voice) | |

=== Short subjects ===
| Year | Title | Role | Notes |
|---|---|---|---|
| 1941 | The Kink of the Campus | Kitty O'Hara | |
| 1941 | I Look at You | | |
| 1942 | The Lamp of Memory | Herself | |
| 1944 | Fun Time | Phyllis | |

=== Unfinished film projects ===
| Year | Title | Notes |
|---|---|---|
| 1947 | Christmas Eve at Pilot Butte | Co-starring Dan Duryea. |
| 1949 | Bagdad | Originally announced as a vehicle for De Carlo, but she fell ill and was replaced with Maureen O'Hara. |
| 1950 | Moon over Java | |
| 1951 | The Girl from Astoli | A film to be shot in Austria. |
| 1951 | Matthew the Matador | Co-starring matador Mario Cabré, who De Carlo had dated |
| 1951 | Mata Hari | |
| 1952 | Sing, You Sinners | Co-starring Jane Russell and Rhonda Fleming as daughters of Jimmy Durante |
| 1953 | Shall We Dance? | A comedy with Alec Guinness and De Carlo playing two touring vaudevillians |
| 1955 | The Baker's Wife | A remake of the 1938 film of the same title with Vittorio De Sica. |

== Television ==
| Year(s) | Title | Role(s) | Notes |
|---|---|---|---|
| 1952 | Lights Out | Marie Von Erdody | Episode: "Another Country" |
| 1953 | The Ford Television Theatre | Prudence Ledyard / Madame 44 | Episode: "Madame 44" |
| 1953 | The Backbone of America | Victoria Johnson | TV film |
| 1956 | Screen Directors Playhouse | Pearl Krauss | Episode: "Hot Cargo" (directed by Tay Garnett) |
| 1956 | Star Stage | Doña María Sánchez | Episode: "The Sainted General" |
| 1957 | Shower of Stars | Various / Herself | Episode: "Skits & Sketches" |
| 1957 | Schlitz Playhouse | Francesca | Episode: "Storm Over Rapallo" |
| 1958 | Playhouse 90 | Marina Arkwright | Episode: "Verdict of Three" |
| 1959 | Bonanza | Lotta Crabtree | Episode: "A Rose for Lotta" |
| 1960 | Adventures in Paradise | Lianne Zagreb | Episode: "Isle of Eden" |
| 1961 | Death Valley Days | Dr. Clare Reed | Episode: "The Lady Was an M.D." |
| 1961–1962 | Follow the Sun | Annie Beeler | Episode: "Annie Beeler's Place"; Episode: "The Longest Crap Game in History" |
| 1963 | Burke's Law | Countess Barbara Erozzi | Episode: "Who Killed Beau Sparrow?" |
| 1963–1969 | The Virginian | Helen Haldeman aka Elena / Imogene Delphinia | Episode: "A Time Remembered"; Episode: "Crime Wave in Buffalo Springs" |
| 1964 | The Greatest Show on Earth | Magda Kolday | Episode: "The Night the Monkey Died" |
| 1964–1966 | The Munsters | Lily Munster | All 70 episodes |
| 1967 | The Girl from U.N.C.L.E. | Nadia Marcolescu | Episode: "The Moulin Ruse Affair" |
| 1967 | Custer | Vanessa Ravenhill | Episode: "The Raiders" |
| 1970 | The Name of the Game | Mrs. Levene | Episode: "Island of Gold and Precious Stones" |
| 1974 | The Girl on the Late, Late Show | Lorraine | TV film |
| 1974 | The Mark of Zorro | Isabella Vega | TV film |
| 1978–1979 | Fantasy Island | Fifi Aprea / Madame Jeannot | Episode: "Charlie's Cherubs/Stalag 3"; Episode: "The Mermaid/The Victim" |
| 1981 | The Munsters' Revenge | Lily Munster | TV film |
| 1985 | Murder, She Wrote | Miss Springer | Episode: "Jessica Behind Bars" |
| 1986 | A Masterpiece of Murder | Mrs. Murphy | TV film |
| 1990 | The Adventures of the Black Stallion | | Episode: "Star Quality" |
| 1991 | Dream On | Francesca Goldman | Episode: "The Second Greatest Story Ever Told" |
| 1993 | Tales from the Crypt | Mrs. Jones | Episode: "Death of Some Salesmen" |
| 1995 | Here Come the Munsters | Restaurant Guest | TV film |
| 1995 | The Barefoot Executive | Norma | TV film |

== Radio ==
| Year | Program | Role | Episode |
|---|---|---|---|
| 1948 | Camel Screen Guild Players | Inez | "Casbah" |
| 1950 | New National Guard Show | Marcelle | "The Doctor and the Orchid" |
| 1952 | Musical Comedy Theatre | Dinah Barkley | "The Barkleys of Broadway" |

== Stage appearances ==
- Hollywood Revels - May, 1941 - Orpheum - performed the number "Dance of the Heat Wave"
- Glamour Over Hollywood - December, 1941 - Florentine Gardens, Los Angeles
- performed the hula number "A Night in Hawaii" in the eight annual police show at the Shrine Auditorium - May, 1942
- an estimated fifteen West Coast rodeos at various venues in the 1940s
- nightclub appearance at the Cocoanut Grove - October 1959

| Year | Title | Role | Theatre | Notes |
|---|---|---|---|---|
| 1964 | Enter Laughing | Angela | Henry Miller's Theatre, New York City, USA | Broadway debut; replaced Vivian Blaine |
| 1968 | Hello Dolly | Dolly Gallagher Levi | New Haven, Connecticut, USA | |
| 1969 | Cactus Flower | Stephanie | Royal Alexandra Theatre, Toronto, Ontario, Canada | |
| 1970 | Follies | Carlotta Campion | Winter Garden Theatre, New York City, USA | Sang "I'm Still Here" |
| 1972 | No, No, Nanette | Nanette | Her Majesty's Theatre, Melbourne, Victoria, Australia | Replaced Cyd Charisse |
| 1973 | Decline and Fall of the Entire World as Seen Through the Eyes of Cole Porter | | Off Broadway Theatre, San Diego, California, USA | |
| 1974 | The Sound of Music | Baroness Elsa Schräder | Crystal Palace, Dallas, Texas, USA | With Jane Jayroe in the title role |
| 1975 | Applause | Margo Channing | California Theatre, San Bernardino, California, USA | |
| 1976 | Dames at Sea | Mona Kent | Embassy Cabaret Theatre, Windsor, Ontario, Canada | |
| 1978 | Gypsy | Mama Rose | Woodminster Summer Theatre, Oakland, California, USA | |
| 1982 | Can-Can | | Tropicana Hotel, Atlantic City, New Jersey, USA | |

== Bibliography ==
- De Carlo, Yvonne; Warren, Doug (1987). Yvonne: An Autobiography. St. Martin's Press. ISBN 9780312002176.
