= The Munsters' Revenge =

1981 American science fiction comedy film

- Genre: Science fiction, comedy
- Written by: Arthur Alsberg; Don Nelson
- Directed by: Don Weis
- Starring: Fred Gwynne; Yvonne De Carlo; Al Lewis; Jo McDonnell; K. C. Martel; Sid Caesar; Bob Hastings
- Music by: Vic Mizzy
- Country of origin: United States
- Original language: English

Production
- Executive producer: Edward J. Montagne
- Producers: Don Nelson; Arthur Alsberg
- Cinematography: Harry L. Wolf
- Editor: Frederic W. Baratta
- Running time: 96 minutes
- Production company: Universal Television

Original release
- Network: NBC
- Release: February 27, 1981

Related
- Munster, Go Home!; Here Come the Munsters; The Munsters

The Munsters' Revenge is a 1981 American made-for-television science fiction comedy film based on the 1964–1966 sitcom The Munsters which reunited original cast members Fred Gwynne, Yvonne De Carlo and Al Lewis. It was the last film made with most of the original actors from the 1960s TV series. Marilyn Munster was portrayed by Jo McDonnell and Eddie Munster by Canadian child actor K. C. Martel. The film was directed by Don Weis (which was his last film) and originally aired on NBC on February 27, 1981.

== Plot ==
The Munster family visits a local wax museum where they have made wax replicas of them. As the museum closes, a scientist activates his controller, causing some of the figures (which are actually robots) to move. The robots of Herman and Grandpa terrorize some citizens and steal their items. The next morning, police arrive at the Munster home to arrest Herman and Grandpa for theft and lock them up, but the two escape, steal the police chief's car, and head over to the wax museum after hours in hopes of clearing their names.

When the scientist activates the robots, Herman and Grandpa deactivate their replicas and pretend to be the robots. There they find a laboratory where Dr. Dustin Diablo mentions a plan for later. They're taken by a moving van until they stop in front of a pizzeria. As they get out, they see a suitcase of money being exchanged between the owner and the scientist. The van then leaves, forcing them to sneak back home. There they meet Glenn, a rookie detective and the police chief's son, who was convinced by Marilyn to help them clear their names. They tell Glenn about the laboratory, but when he goes to search the wax museum, the robots are replaced and the laboratory is gone, much to the chagrin of his father.

Herman and Grandpa dress up as waitresses and infiltrate the pizzeria and wait until the owner meets up with an accomplice and leaves. They follow him back to the wax museum where, pretending to be the robots, they hear about Dr. Diablo's plan to rob the jewels of a pharaoh mummy being displayed at the museum on Halloween. Grandpa comes up with a plan to use a life rejuvenation serum on the mummy to bring him back to life and have him capture the gang, except that the serum is back in Transylvania. After sneaking aboard a plane, they make it to Grandpa's old laboratory where they meet his old assistant Igor just before he dies. Grandpa injects the serum into Igor, causing him to live and become young enough to where he won't be killed by angry villagers.

Herman and Grandpa make it back home just before Halloween where a number of relatives have arrived for the celebration. Lily tells them that Marilyn and Glenn went to the wax museum but haven't returned. Herman and Cousin Phantom make their way there and find them captured in a shatterproof container. A very high note from Cousin Phantom eventually breaks the container allowing Marilyn, Glenn and Herman to meet Grandpa at the museum. Grandpa administers the serum to the mummy while Marilyn steals the controller, rendering the robots useless. As Dr. Diablo tries to get the jewels, the mummy grabs him until the police arrive, helping vindicate Glenn. It is later revealed that Herman is the mummy, as Grandpa gave the real mummy too much serum causing him to be three years old.

== Cast ==
=== Main cast ===
Character	Actor
Herman Munster	Fred Gwynne
Lily Munster	Yvonne De Carlo
Grandpa	Al Lewis
Marilyn Munster	Jo McDonnell
Eddie Munster	K. C. Martel
Dr. Dustin Diablo	Sid Caesar
Phantom of the Opera	Bob Hastings

== Home media ==
The Munsters' Revenge was first released on VHS by MCA Home Video in 1986 and later by GoodTimes Home Video on November 7, 1996. It is available in the US on a 2006 DVD double-feature known as Two-Movie Fright Fest alongside Munster, Go Home!.

It is available on DVD in Region 4 as part of 'The Munsters Collection' boxset which was released August 3, 2016.

It was re-released along with Munster, Go Home! on Blu-ray through Shout! Factory on March 31, 2020, and also in the 2016 complete series of The Munsters Seasons 1 and 2 as DVD extras on the last disc of Season 2.
