= The Mini-Munsters =

- Genre: Animation; Comedy; Children's television series; Telefilm
- Based on: The Munsters
- Written by: Arthur Alsberg; Don Nelson
- Directed by: Gerard Baldwin
- Starring: Cynthia Adler; Bobby Diamond; Ron Feinberg; Henry Gibson; Al Lewis; Richard Long; Arnold Stang; Jack DeLeon
- Theme music composer: Steve Zuckerman
- Country of origin: United States
- Original language: English

Production
- Producer: Fred Calvert
- Editors: Peter Aries; Susan Shippey; William Shippey
- Running time: 1 hour
- Production company: Universal City Studios, LLC

Original release
- Network: ABC
- Release: October 27, 1973

Related
- Lost in Space; Nanny and the Professor and the Phantom of the Circus

The Mini-Munsters is an animated telefilm that was aired as part of The ABC Saturday Superstar Movie in 1973, and was based on the characters from The Munsters. Of the original series' cast, only Al Lewis (Grandpa) lent his voice to the special.

== Plot ==
The cartoon begins with some gangsters asking directions to an oil refinery. After Herman gives them directions, the gasoline company president is seen bound and gagged in the back of the gangsters' car. Soon after a messenger bat arrives from Transylvania and the Munsters are informed their cousins Igor and Lucretia are coming to visit them. They go to the airport, where the cousins are found waiting for them on the luggage carousel. Initially Eddie (now a teenager) wants nothing to do with his cousins, at first thinking that they are younger than him, but since they all like playing rock music, they form a band. Herman is annoyed by the music the Mini-Munsters play, so they offer to play their music at school. Since Herman had promised to buy Eddie a car, they go buy a used hearse. When Eddie asks if there is enough room in the back of the hearse for their instruments, Herman stretches it out in the back, and assures them there is. They discover that the old hearse is haunted by the funeral director who owned it when he was alive. Grandpa adds an invention that allows for the car to run on music when it runs out of gas. The device becomes popular, and the gangsters, who have taken over a gasoline company, are infuriated. The gangster boss challenges the Munsters to a race with his sports car, which the Munsters win. It seems the faster Eddie, Lucretia and Igor play their music, the faster the hearse travels. When they beat the gangster boss in a race at the park Grand Prix course, the gangsters capture the Munsters' pet dragon Spot by tricking the family into leaving their house for an award ceremony, which Herman learns was not real. The gangsters then threaten to harm Spot if Grandpa does not destroy his invention. The young Munsters find Spot and thwart the gangsters by getting Spot back.

== Cast ==
- Richard Long as Herman Munster
- Cynthia Adler as Lily Munster
- Al Lewis as Grandpa Munster
- Bobby Diamond as Eddie Munster
- Henry Gibson as Mr. Grundy
- Ron Feinberg as Various characters
- Stuart Getz as Various characters

== Development ==
This movie was created with hopes of developing an animated spin-off of the original Munsters series, but it was not picked up as a series. The movie aired on October 27, 1973, as an hour-long special, however a shorter, half-hour version was aired in the 1980s.
