= The Young Loner =

The Young Loner is a 1968 TV movie from Disney. It was directed by Michael O'Herlihy.

It was based on the 1963 book by Ester Wier entitled The Loner.

== Cast ==
- Edward Andrews as Bert Shannon
- Kim Hunter as Freda Williams
- Butch Patrick as Bumper
- Frank Silvera as Carlos
- Jane Zachary as Angie
