= Butch Patrick =

American actor and musician (born 1953)

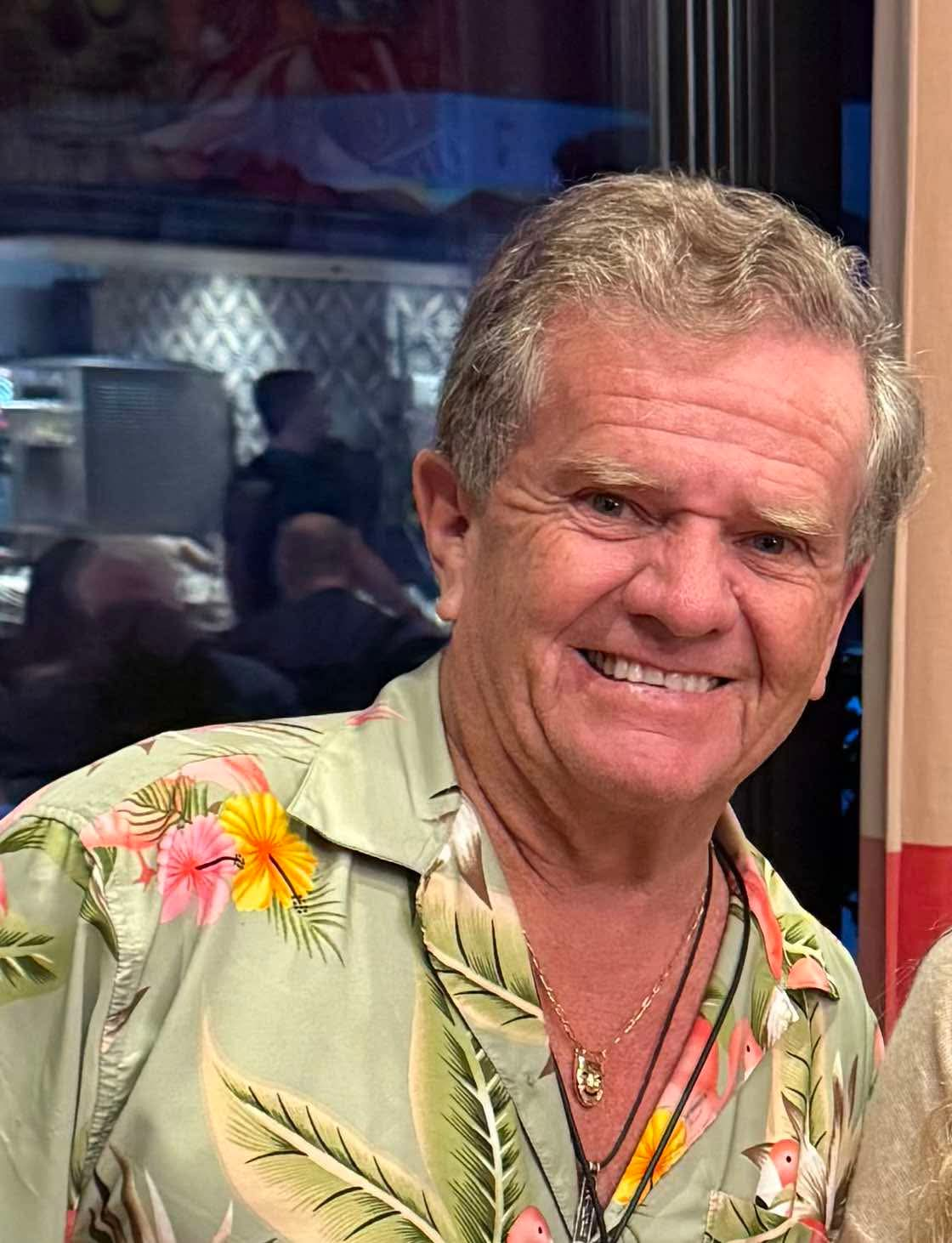
- Patrick in 2025
- Born: Patrick Alan Lilley; August 2, 1953 (age 73); Inglewood, California, U.S.
- Occupations: Actor; musician
- Years active: 1961–present
- Spouse: Leila Murray (m. 2016)

Butch Patrick (born Patrick Alan Lilley; August 2, 1953) is an American actor and musician. Beginning his professional acting career at the age of seven, Patrick is perhaps best known for his role as child werewolf Eddie Munster on the CBS comedy television series The Munsters from 1964 to 1966 and in the 1966 feature film Munster, Go Home!, and as Mark on the ABC Saturday morning series Lidsville from 1971 to 1973.

== Life and career ==
Patrick Alan Lilley was born on August 2, 1953, in Inglewood, California. He was spotted by a talent agent at the age of seven, which led to a series of appearances in television commercials and guest appearances on TV shows. In 1961 he made his feature-film debut in the 20th Century Fox comedy–fantasy The Two Little Bears, in which he co-starred with Eddie Albert and Jane Wyatt.

Over the next two years, Patrick went on to appear in guest-starring roles on numerous television series, including Ben Casey, Alcoa Premiere, Bonanza, My Favorite Martian, Gunsmoke, Mister Ed, and Rawhide and recurring roles on The Real McCoys and General Hospital. These roles would have him appear opposite headliners including Judy Garland, Burt Lancaster, and Sidney Poitier.

When recounting how he began his acting career, Patrick explained "I owe my career to my sister. She was the one who got me started and gave me all the encouragement. She always wanted to be an actress and was on the casting call sheet one day. She was asked if there were any other children at home. She told them about me, and I got some small roles, then some bigger ones..."

In 1964 while living in Geneseo, Illinois, just east of the Quad Cities, Patrick landed the role of child werewolf Eddie Munster, starring alongside Fred Gwynne as Herman Munster, Yvonne De Carlo as Lily Munster and Al Lewis as Grandpa, on the CBS television series The Munsters, a fantasy situation comedy loosely based on Universal's movie monsters. The role of Eddie was originally portrayed by child actor Happy Derman in the pilot episode before Patrick was ultimately selected out of hundreds of boys for the role.

When asked how he landed the role of Eddie, Patrick recalled "I had a lot of experience. But maybe it was because my fangs were my own teeth. My teeth were so bad, that even when I closed my mouth they stuck out. I was about a head smaller than the other kids, and they liked that because it played off Herman's height." Living on the East Coast at the time, Patrick commuted to Los Angeles every week during filming of the series, appearing in 70 episodes during The Munsters' two-season run from 1964 to 1966.

In an April 2017 interview, when asked if he recalled his TV mother (Yvonne De Carlo) hiding tiny portions of dialogue around the set, attaching them to props to help jog her memory, so the dialogue could be added to her performance: "No, not in The Munsters she wasn't doing that. Maybe later in life. Because sometimes your memory starts slipping on you. But that's a great idea, actually! I'll have to remember that!".

He also was asked if he had kept in touch with his on-screen family after The Munsters was canceled, especially De Carlo, who died on January 8, 2007. He replied, "No, after the show ended, everyone went their own ways. But in the early '80s, I contacted Al Lewis and we became friends and I started attaching myself to the Munster name and brand. And then 10 years after that I started talking to Yvonne. I was actually a guest on The Vicki Lawrence Show (Note: Although Butch Patrick said he appeared on The Vicki Lawrence Show, he actually meant the Vicki! talk show, episode aired February 3, 1994.) where I was this surprise guest brought out for Yvonne and after that we became friends. I started visiting her and she was somewhat of a recluse, living in North Los Angeles and I introduced her to this guy in Hollywood who would send her care packages, movies to watch and sort of get her back in the loop of Hollywood."

After The Munsters ended, Patrick continued to appear in guest-starring roles on various popular television series of the 1960s, including I Dream of Jeannie, Death Valley Days, Gunsmoke, The Monkees, Daniel Boone, and Adam-12, as well as a recurring role as Gordon Dearing on the CBS family comedy series My Three Sons. During this time, Patrick also appeared in several Disney films, including The Young Loner, The One and Only, Genuine, Original Family Band, and Way Down Cellar on TV's The Wonderful World of Disney. He also portrayed the role of Milo in the MGM live-action/animated film The Phantom Tollbooth, which had been filmed in 1967 and completed in 1968, but was held up from release until late 1970 by internal studio problems.

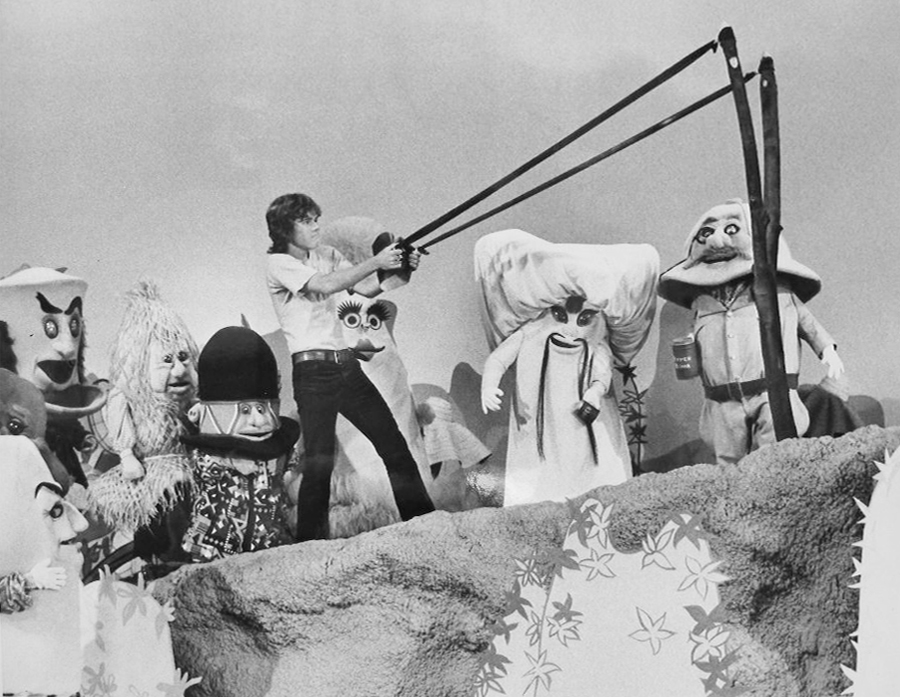
Patrick as Mark with the hats in Lidsville, 1971

In 1971, Patrick landed the starring role on Sid and Marty Krofft's Saturday morning children's program Lidsville, broadcast on ABC. In the psychedelic fantasy series, Patrick portrayed Mark, a boy lost in a strange land of walking, talking, singing hats, opposite veteran character actors Charles Nelson Reilly and Billie Hayes. The show was in production from 1971 to 1973.

In 1975, Patrick left acting to work for his father and began to learn to play the bass guitar. In 1983, he recorded the song, "Whatever Happened to Eddie?" (b/w "Little Monsters"), with several instrumentalists and backup singers under the group name "Eddie and the Monsters." Set to the tune of the Munsters theme, the song details his life as a Munster. ("You might wonder why I have a dragon for a pet—well, he's just there to keep me company on the set.") The single was released by Rocshire Records. In 2007 Patrick recorded a song "It's Only Halloween" that was released on Park Lane Drive Records.

In addition to his music, Patrick returned to occasional film and television work, including making cameo appearances as "Himself" on episodes of the Fox animated television series The Simpsons and the 2003 comedy film Dickie Roberts: Former Child Star, as well as appearing as a grown-up Eddie Munster in a Little Caesars Pizza commercial. He appeared as himself on Cristina's Court, having been sued by the manager of his website.

In 2002, Patrick co-hosted Macabre Theatre with Natalie Popovich, aka "Ivonna Cadaver". That same year he also appeared in the first episode of the E! Network celebrity dating reality television show Star Dates.

Patrick made a cameo appearance in the 2005 retro-horror film Frankenstein vs. the Creature from Blood Cove, directed by William Winckler, playing a man who had become a werewolf, speaking a line of dialogue in comical reference to The Munsters.

== Personal life ==
On September 11, 2016, Patrick married his longtime girlfriend Leila Murray.

== Politics ==
Patrick is a friend and ally of Arkansas Governor Sarah Huckabee Sanders, who is a political ally of President Donald Trump. Patrick posed for a photo with Sarah Sanders.

== Filmography ==
=== Film ===
Year	Title	Role	Notes
1961	The Two Little Bears	Billy Davis	
1962	Hand of Death	Davey	
1962	Pressure Point	Imaginary Playmate	Uncredited
1963	A Child Is Waiting	Boy Playing Football	Uncredited
1963	Showdown	Kid	Uncredited
1964	One Man's Way	John Peale	
1966	Munster, Go Home!	Eddie Munster	
1970	The Phantom Tollbooth	Milo	Filmed in 1967 and completed in 1968.
1971	The Sandpit Generals	No Legs	
1991	Scary Movie	Eddie	
2003	Dickie Roberts: Former Child Star	Himself	
2005	Spaced Out	Bartender	Direct-to-video
2009	Kitaro's Graveyard Gang	Wolfman (voice)	English dub
2009	It Came from Trafalgar	Roy Autry	
2010	Soupernatural	Man with a Knife	
2010	Eat me	Flipper	Short film
2011	Kitaro's Graveyard Gang 2	Wolfman (voice)	English dub
2012	Young Blood: Evil Intentions	Principal	
2014	Zombie Dream	Butch	
2015	Bite School	Butch	
2019	He Drives at Night	Atty General Edward Talmadge	
2022	Horrortales.666 Part 3	Detective Mike	
2022	Quakeasaurus	Mayor Myers	
2022	Old Man Jackson	Priest Edwin Mumsford	
2022	The Munsters	The Tin Can Man	Voice

=== Television ===
Year	Title	Role	Notes
1961	The Detectives	Bobby	Episode: "The Legend of Jim Riva"
1962	Ben Casey	Billy	Episode: "A Pleasant Thing for the Eyes"
1962	Alcoa Premiere	Wesley, Tommy	2 episodes
1962	The Untouchables	Charlie	Episode: "The Night They Shot Santa Claus"
1962–1971	My Three Sons	Gordon Dearing, Elmore Crocker, Little Boy	9 episodes
1963	General Hospital	Johnny Mercer	1 episode
1963	The Real McCoys	Greg Howard	7 episodes
1963	Death Valley Days	Tommy	Episode: "A Kingdom for a Horse"
1963	My Favorite Martian	Stevie	Episode: "How to Be a Hero Without Really Trying"
1963	Bonanza	Jody Fletcher	Episode: "The Prime of Life"
1963–1966	Mister Ed	Stevie, Tommy Slater	2 episodes
1964	Rawhide	Danny	Episode: " Incident of the Pied Piper"
1964–1966	The Munsters	Eddie Munster	70 episodes
1964–1967	Gunsmoke	Tom John, Runt	2 episodes
1966	Pistols 'n' Petticoats	Chad Turner	Episode: "A Crooked Line"
1966–1967	I Dream of Jeannie	Richard	2 episodes
1967	The Monkees	Melvin	S2:E15, "The Christmas Show"
1968	The Young Loner	Bumper	Television film
1968	The Magical World of Disney	Bumper, Frank Wilson	4 episodes
1968	Family Affair	Frankie	Episode: "By a Whisker"
1969	Daniel Boone	Black Cat Jack	Episode: "Copperhead Izzy"
1969	Marcus Welby, M.D.	Sailor Ballinger	Episode: "All Flags Flying"
1969–1970	Adam-12	Paul Foster, Tony Niccola	2 episodes
1970	Headmaster	Ritchie	Episode: "May I Turn On?"
1971–1972	Lidsville	Mark	17 episodes
1971–1972	The Smith Family	Freddie, Jerry, Gray, Hank	5 episodes
1974	Shazam!	Jack	Episode: "The Athlete"
1974	Lucas Tanner	Jack	Episode: "By the Numbers"
1974	Ironside	Barney Parkos	Episode: "Act of Vengeance"
1995	Here Come the Munsters	Restaurant Guest	Television film
1999	The Simpsons	Butch Patrick (voice)	Episode: "Eight Misbehavin'"
2002	Macabre Theatre	Eddie Munster	5 episodes
2009	Life's a Butch	Himself	

=== Music videos ===
Year	Title	Role	Notes
2019	"I Am John 5"	Himself	
