= The Munsters (2022 film) =

2022 comedy film by Rob Zombie

- Official release poster
- Directed by: Rob Zombie
- Written by: Rob Zombie
- Based on: Characters developed by: Norm Liebmann; & Ed Haas; from a format; by Allan Burns; & Chris Hayward
- Produced by: Mike Elliott; Rob Zombie
- Starring: Sheri Moon Zombie; Jeff Daniel Phillips; Daniel Roebuck; Richard Brake; Jorge Garcia; Sylvester McCoy; Catherine Schell; Cassandra Peterson
- Cinematography: Zoran Popovic
- Edited by: Vanick Moradian
- Music by: Zeuss
- Production companies: Universal 1440 Entertainment; Spookshow International Films; Hero Squared; Capital Arts Entertainment
- Distributed by: Universal Pictures Home Entertainment
- Release date: September 27, 2022
- Running time: 110 minutes
- Country: United States
- Language: English

The Munsters is a 2022 American horror comedy film produced, written, and directed by Rob Zombie and starring Sheri Moon Zombie, Jeff Daniel Phillips, Daniel Roebuck, Richard Brake, Jorge Garcia, Sylvester McCoy, Catherine Schell, and Cassandra Peterson. Based on the 1960s family sitcom of the same title, the story takes place prior to the events of the series, serving as an origin story for the characters.

A lifelong fan of the series, Rob Zombie had pursued developing a Munsters film with Universal Pictures before the release of his debut feature in 2003, and was attached to several related projects before confirming a film adaptation of the television series in 2021. Zombie wanted the film to be in black and white, but the studio refused, and the director opted for a highly saturated look instead. Principal photography began in November 2021 in Budapest.

The Munsters is a co-production of Universal 1440 Entertainment and Spookshow International Films. It was released on Digital, Blu-ray, and DVD, and also available to stream on Netflix in the US on September 27, 2022. It received mixed reviews from critics.

== Plot ==
Mad scientist Dr. Henry Augustus Wolfgang and his hunchbacked assistant Floop rob graves for body parts to build an experimental creation including the fingers of the zombie pianist Franz Pennywhacker who Wolfgang strikes in the head to render him dead. Floop accidentally steals the head of hacky comedian Shecky Von Rathbone instead of Shecky's astrophysicist brother Shelly, whom Wolfgang wanted. Wolfgang uses electricity to give life to his Frankenstein creation, which Floop names "Herman Munster".

Seeking revenge on her ex-husband, the Count, Romani Zoya Krupp entrances the Count's werewolf son Lester to come to her tent as she states that Lester owes her money. Under threat of Zoya's brother Bela beheading him, Lester agrees to Zoya's plan to have the Count sell her his Transylvanian castle so she can turn it into a casino and theme park. Lester calls his father with the proposal, but the Count immediately dismisses it.

Over breakfast served by faithful servant Igor, the Count talks with his 150-year-old vampire daughter Lily Gruesella about her unsatisfying love life and disappointing recent date with Count Orlock. Lily and the Count watch the TV show Good Morning Transylvania with host Ezra Mosher. Ezra's guest Dr. Wolfgang unveils Herman Munster live on the air. Wolfgang is disgusted to discover Herman is a bumbling brute with a goofy sense of humor when he begins performing a stand-up comedy routine. However, Lily falls in love with Herman's unusual personality.

Herman becomes a celebrity with Floop acting as his manager and Lily goes to see him perform with his band "The Punk Rods" at Zoya's nightclub. Lily is directed to him by Lester after he received another warning from Zoya. Herman immediately falls for Lily when they meet. The two agree to a dinner date the following night at the Count's castle. The Count takes an instant disliking to Herman due to his dimwittedness and begins scheming with Igor to use a magic spell to get rid of him. The Count later tries to conjure a new mate for Lily, but his potion inadvertently summons a semi-sentient chimpanzee instead.

A week of dating culminates in Herman and Lily vacationing at Devil's Island Penal Colony. Lily accepts Herman's wedding proposal. Herman meets Lester for the first time at his wedding. With Herman as the new head of the household, Lester manipulates him into signing over the castle's deed to Zoya by promising a lucrative business venture. Herman and Lily are married as Wolfgang states to the Count that Herman is now his problem.

Herman and Lily honeymoon in Paris, where Herman captures a reptilian creature that had been haunting the city's sewers. Herman and Lily adopt the monster as a pet whom they name Spot. After Zoya serves him with an eviction notice, the Count angrily confronts Herman in Paris. Lily learns that Herman fell for one of Lester's schemes, costing them their home. Lily states that she will call the lawyer Shady MaGoon when they get back to Transylvania.

After Lily hears some comments from the incarcerated Shady MaGoon confirming that they don't have a case against Zoya, Herman watches a TV personality named Zombo and decides that they can get a fresh start by moving to Hollywood so he can become a famous star. Realtor Barbara Carr gives them a brief tour of Hollywood before taking them to Mockingbird Heights. Barbara shows the Munsters a model home, but the trio insists on buying a dilapidated old house at the 1313 address.

The family join their neighbors for a Halloween block party. Unaware of the holiday's customs, the Munsters assume they are partying with other freaks and weirdos. The residents assume the Munsters are wearing costumes, and award them a $1,500 contest prize.

Herman leaves the house for his first day of work carrying corpses at the Gateman, Goodbury, and Graves funeral parlor. Getting his first look at Mockingbird Heights outside of Halloween, Herman retreats in shock when he sees that they live among normal people in an idyllic suburb. Lily and the Count are equally horrified.

Lester arrives at the house unexpectedly. Although the Munsters are initially unhappy to see him after what Zoya made him do, Lester presents Herman with a check for his portion of gambling money that Lester won in Las Vegas using Zoya's payment for the Count's castle. Herman and Lily excitedly realize they are now rich.

== Cast ==
- Sheri Moon Zombie as:
  - Lily, a female vampire who falls for Herman
  - Donna Doomley, a newswoman who reports on the deaths of brothers Shecky and Shelly Von Rathbone
- Jeff Daniel Phillips as
  - Herman, a simulacrum made up of different body parts
  - Shecky Von Rathbone, a deceased comedian whose brain was accidentally used in creating Herman
  - Zombo, a monster TV personality in the USA
- Daniel Roebuck as:
  - The Count, (Note: Roebuck's character is known as Grandpa in the television series on which the film is based, though as the film is a prequel set before he is a grandfather, he is referred to as "The Count".) Lily's vampire father
  - Ezra Mosher, the host of Good Morning Transylvania
- Richard Brake as:
  - Dr. Wolfgang, the mad scientist who created Herman
  - Orlock, a vampire who was one of Lily's past dates
- Jorge Garcia as Floop, Dr. Wolfgang's hunchbacked assistant
- Sylvester McCoy as Igor, the Count's servant, later turned into a bat by him
- Catherine Schell as Zoya Krupp, a Romani woman who is the Count's ex-wife
- Cassandra Peterson as Barbara Carr, a real estate agent who leads the Munsters to their home in Mockingbird Heights
- Tomas Boykin as Lester, a werewolf and Lily's brother
- Levente Törköly as Bela Krupp, Zoya's brother and enforcer
- Jeremy Wheeler as Mr. Gateman, the co-owner of a funeral parlor
- Roderick Hill as Mr. Goodbury, the co-owner of a funeral parlor
- Mark Griffith as Mr. Graves, the co-owner of a funeral parlor
- Renáta Kiss as Uncle Gilbert, a gill-man who is Lily's uncle
- Victor Egri as the in-suit performer of the Tin Can Man who later officiates Herman and Lily's wedding
  - Butch Patrick, who played Eddie Munster on the original 1964–1966 TV series, provides the voice of the Tin Can Man
- Laurent Winkler as Shelly Von Rathbone, an astrophysicist whose brain was intended to be used in creating Herman
- Dave Thompson as Franz Pennywhacker, the zombie of a famous pianist
  - Fred Coury provides Pennywhacker's voice; he also voices the raven in the Munsters' cuckoo clock.
- Miklós Kapácsy as Shady MaGoon, an incarcerated Hungarian lawyer that the family consults upon Zoya sending the Count an eviction notice
- Pat Priest, who played Marilyn Munster on the original series, voices the Transylvania Airlines announcer. Dee Wallace voices the Good Morning Transylvania announcer.

== Production ==
=== Development ===
A lifelong fan of the 1960s television series, Rob Zombie had pursued developing a film before the release of his debut feature, House of 1000 Corpses (2003), which first began as a Universal production. Zombie expressed his enthusiasm for the property to the studio's chairman Stacey Snider, only to learn a new take was already in development. In 2016, the director learned of another Munsters project for Universal, and became involved. He began to overhaul a film "aimed at preschoolers" that originally focused on Herman and Lily's son, Eddie, but Universal eventually cancelled to explore television options instead.

In March 2021, it was reported that Zombie was developing a feature film adaptation of the television series. This was confirmed by Zombie in June. In April of the same year, it was also reported that the project was being developed as a simultaneous theatrical and Peacock-exclusive film, but these reports turned out to be erroneous. The movie's budget was also rumored to be $40 million but Rob Zombie said that was untrue.

=== Pre-production ===
Zombie flew to Budapest in June 2021 to begin location scouting. On July 2, 2021, Sheri Moon Zombie confirmed that the film was in the pre-production stage. Zombie shared numerous pre-production materials through his social media accounts, including designs for the Munsters' house on Mockingbird Lane and early sculpting for Herman Munster's head prosthetic.

On July 26, 2021, Rob Zombie shared the first costume designs for Lily and Herman. Further costume designs were revealed later that month. Wayne Toth's Ex Mortis special effects studio worked on special effects make-up for the film. Toth has regularly collaborated with Rob Zombie, including on the films Halloween, House of 1000 Corpses and The Devil's Rejects. In September 2021, Zombie returned to the US for a series of tour dates but continued to share updates from the construction of Mockingbird Lane on his Instagram.

=== Casting ===
Rob Zombie used social media to bring casting and character updates to fans during the production of The Munsters. His first announcement came in October 2021, when he revealed the main cast members—this included Jeff Daniel Phillips, who would be playing Herman Munster; Sheri Moon Zombie, who would be playing Lily Munster; and Dan Roebuck, who would be playing the Count. All three actors were veterans of Rob Zombie movies, and Zombie explained, "I couldn't risk getting on set in Budapest and going, my leads aren't getting along, they have no chemistry. So that's why I chose the cast I chose. Jeff Daniel Phillips and Sheri Moon Zombie and Daniel Roebuck, they work together a lot and I knew they would just fall right into it."

Actor Richard Brake was cast as Dr. Henry Augustus Wolfgang, "Transylvania's most popular mad scientist". This was the fourth Rob Zombie movie that Brake has been cast in, previously appearing in Halloween, 31 and 3 from Hell. Brake finished filming in May 2022. Scottish actor Sylvester McCoy was cast as Igor, "the loyal servant to the Munsters". McCoy wrapped in April 2022. In early 2022, Rob Zombie shared the first photo from the set of Catherine Schell, making her first film appearance since 1993, who would be playing Zoya Krupp. American actor and comedian Jorge Garcia played Floop, "Dr. Wolfgang's hunchback assistant and Herman Munster's best buddy". Cassandra Peterson, better known as the horror hostess character Elvira, Mistress of the Dark, was cast as Barbara Carr, "the number 1 real estate agent in all of Mockingbird Heights". Peterson said the role was "so so different from what I normally do, I'm playing a super straight character". Actress Dee Wallace was cast as "the voice of Good Morning Transylvania". Wallace has appeared in several Rob Zombie movies, including Halloween, The Haunted World of El Superbeasto, The Lords of Salem and 3 from Hell. British actor Jeremy Wheeler would join the cast as "Mr. Gateman, Herman's boss at the one and only Gateman, Goodbury and Graves Funeral Parlor". Actor Tomas Boykin was cast as Lily's brother Lester. Boykin had previously appeared in Rob Zombie's 3 from Hell.

Following speculation about original Munsters cast members, Rob Zombie revealed that Pat Priest, who played Marilyn Munster from 1964 to 1966, had joined the cast of his movie. Another Munsters original actor, Butch Patrick, who played Eddie Munster from 1964 to 1966, was revealed to be playing the Tin Can Man, a robot built by Eddie on the series. Several minor characters were announced to appear with no casting information: Uncle Gilbert, who was in the original episode "Love Comes to Mockingbird Heights" and was played by Richard Hale, and Zombo, originally featured in the second season. Count Orlock also returned, and Zombie hinted that the character was a former beau of Lily's before she met Herman.

=== Filming ===
Principal photography officially began in November 2021, in Budapest. The producers felt a black and white film would be difficult to market. Zombie noticed the actors in makeup off set looked like "cartoon characters come to life", and decided to light the film in the same colorful "hyper-real" fashion. Because of COVID-19 lockdowns, the cast lived together in the same building for three months and got to know each other. Filming had wrapped by July 7, 2022.

=== Music ===
Rob Zombie revealed that long-time collaborator Zeuss would be composing the music for The Munsters. Zeuss had previously scored the music for Zombie's 3 from Hell and 31.

In July 2022, two original songs for The Munsters were released, "It's Zombo" and "The House of Zombo", which feature performances by Rob Zombie, Jeff Daniel Phillips and Sheri Moon Zombie. "I Got You Babe", a cover of the Sonny & Cher song performed by Sheri Moon Zombie and Phillips, was released in August. The three tracks were made available on streaming platforms and a limited edition 12-inch single from Waxwork Records.

On September 23, 2022, the full soundtrack was released on streaming platforms, featuring original songs from the film, including the previously released singles, and the original score music by Zeuss. It was also released as a double vinyl LP by Waxwork Records. In total there are 56 tracks with a runtime of 1 hour and 15 minutes.

The track "They Are The Munsters", written by Rob Zombie and Zeuss, was nominated for a Hollywood Music in Media Awards in November 2022.

== Release ==
=== Marketing ===
The first trailer was released on July 13, 2022, revealing elements of the plot, while also indicating the film's scheduled release month; it was met with a mixed-to-negative reception.

=== Netflix ===
On July 18, 2022, Zombie announced that The Munsters would be released on the streaming platform Netflix in the fall, around the same time as Netflix's Wednesday, a spin-off of The Addams Family. A date of September 27, 2022, was given in late August for the film's Netflix premiere.

=== Home media ===
On July 20, it was announced that The Munsters would be released on Blu-ray, DVD and digital platforms, starting on September 27, 2022. The "Collector's Edition" includes an hour-long behind the scenes feature called The Munsters: Return to Mockingbird Lane, plus feature-length commentary from the director. The film grossed $1,470,601 in home video sales.

== Reception ==
On the review aggregator website Rotten Tomatoes, 52% of 54 critics' reviews are positive, with an average rating of 4.7/10. The website's consensus reads: "The Rob Zombified Munsters revival shows clear affection for the source material, but it never translates into a compelling update on the classic series." Metacritic, which uses a weighted average, assigned the film a score of 57 out of 100, based on 10 critics, indicating "mixed or average" reviews.

Leigh Monson, of The A.V. Club, gave the film a B−, writing "As a movie, it's nothing but loose ends, a lukewarm stew of concepts that haven't been stirred enough to combine in the cauldron. But as a faux television pilot, the actors, the sketches, the sight gags, and the puns mesh together endearingly." Matt Donato of IGN called it "a wholesome labor of love that's probably for the most diehard sitcom fans because for better and worse, Rob Zombie makes the Munsters reboot he wants to see." Owen Gleiberman wrote "The Munsters, the family-of-ghouls '60s sitcom that Zombie is adapting, was such a ticky-tacky piece of gothic bat-house surrealism that the movie, broad and slovenly as it is, works more than it doesn't."

Steve Schneider, of Orlando Weekly, gave the film a 1 out of 5 rating, writing, "Zombie has zero ability to structure a story: While his flick feels nearly interminable at 110 minutes, entire sections of plot seem to be missing, or at least glossed over. And he doesn't know how to tell a joke." William Bibbiani, of TheWrap, also gave a negative review: "It's the kind of film you'd expect to see on a television set in the background of any other Rob Zombie film ... The appeal is understandable, but it doesn't make for much of a movie." Screen Rant gave it a 2-star rating, stating, "Rob Zombie's mismanagement of nostalgia and modern expectations leaves us with a half-baked attempt that was brimming with great potential."
