= Beverley Owen =

American television actress (1937–2019)

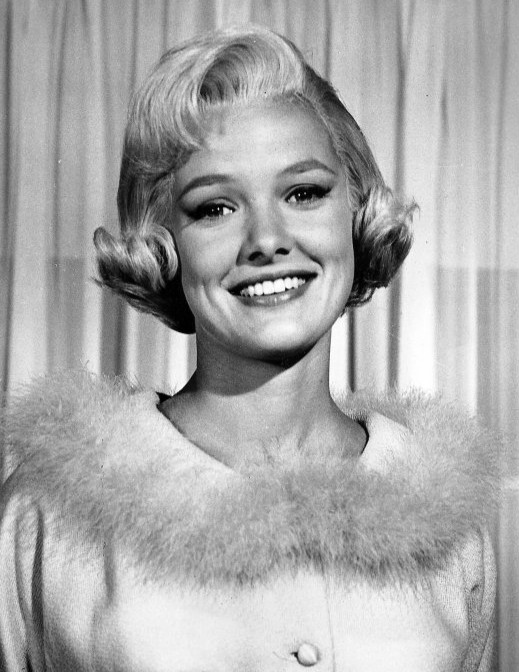
- Owen as Marilyn Munster in 1964
- Born: Beverley Jane Ogg; May 13, 1937; Ottumwa, Iowa, U.S.
- Died: February 21, 2019 (aged 81); Londonderry, Vermont, U.S.
- Other name: Beverley Owen Stone
- Education: University of Michigan
- Occupation: Actress
- Years active: 1961–2004
- Spouse: Jon Stone (m. 1964; div. 1974)
- Children: 2

Beverley Jane Stone (née Ogg; May 13, 1937 – February 21, 2019), known professionally as Beverley Owen, was an American television actress, best known for having originated the role of Marilyn Munster on the sitcom The Munsters before the role was taken over by Pat Priest.

== Early life ==
Beverley Jane Ogg was born on May 13, 1937, in Ottumwa, Iowa. She was the first born child of Wallace E. Ogg and Charlotte M. Vander Ploeg. She grew up in Ames, Iowa, where her father was a professor of agricultural economics at Iowa State University. Her mother died in 1953.

== Career ==
In 1956, Owen appeared in her first TV role in As the World Turns. Owen appeared on the shows The Doctors, Kraft Mystery Theatre, The Virginian, Wagon Train, and Another World and in the 1964 feature film Bullet for a Badman, starring Audie Murphy, after which she got the role of Marilyn Munster on The Munsters. In 1972, she played Dr. Paula McCrea for nine months on the soap opera Another World.

== Personal life ==
Owen left The Munsters after 13 episodes to marry future Sesame Street writer and producer Jon Stone in Newfane, Vermont, on June 27, 1964. They were married for 10 years until 1974. She had two daughters, Polly and Kate. After her divorce in 1974, she continued to pursue her studies in early American history and earned a master's degree in 1989.

== Death ==
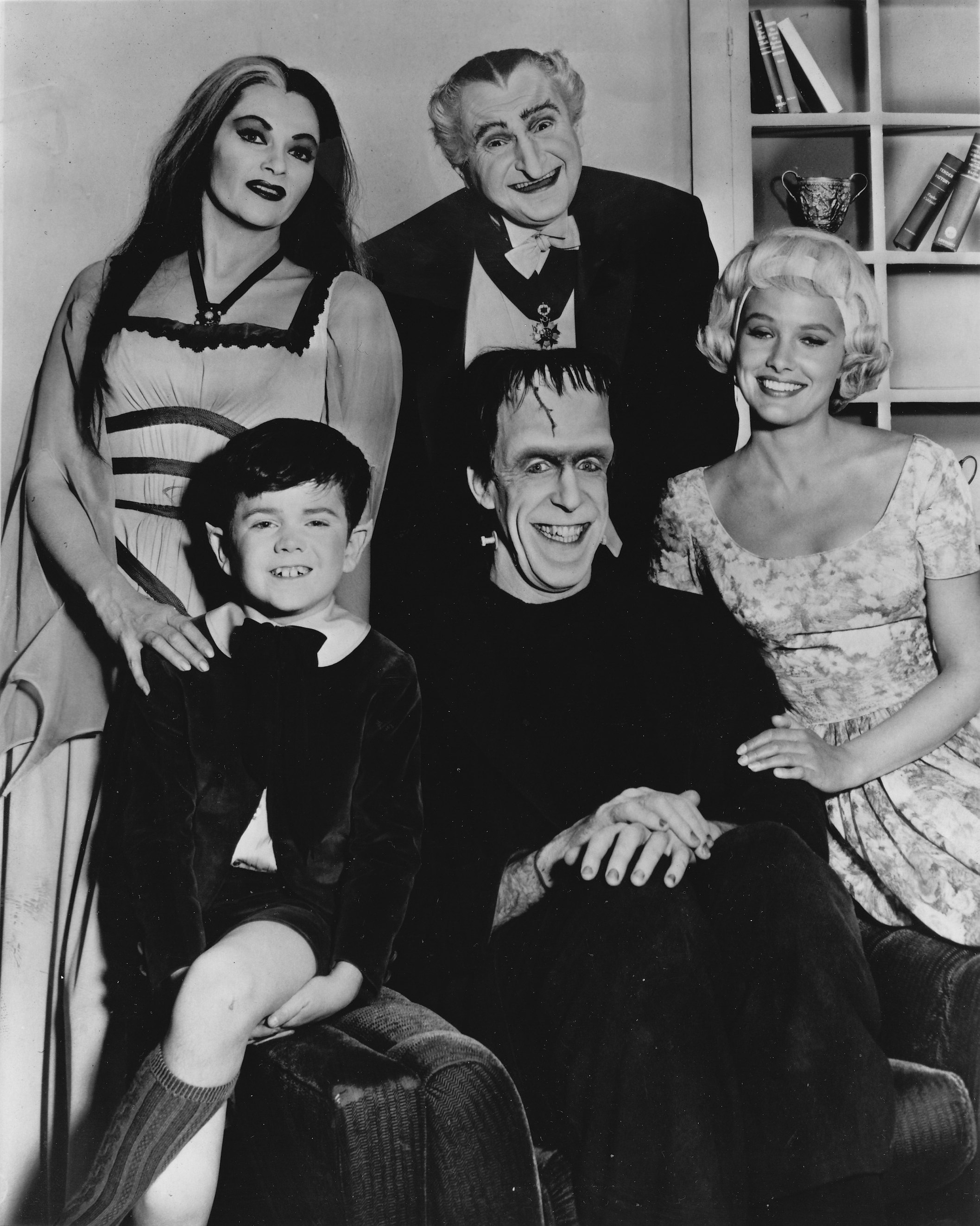
The cast of The Munsters. Standing, L–R: Yvonne De Carlo, Al Lewis. Sitting: Butch Patrick, Fred Gwynne, Beverley Owen.

Owen died of ovarian cancer on February 21, 2019, at the age of 81. Butch Patrick, her co-star on The Munsters, released a Facebook statement on February 24, 2019, stating, "Beautiful Beverley Owen has left us. What a sweet soul. I had the biggest crush on her. RIP Bev and thanks for your 13 memorable Marilyn Munster episodes."

== Selected filmography ==
- As the World Turns
- The Doctors
- Bullet for a Badman
- Wagon Train
- The Virginian
- Another World
- The Munsters
