= Star Dates =

- Genre: reality
- Presented by: Jordan Black (season 1); Reggie Gaskins (season 2)
- Country of origin: United States
- Original language: English

Production
- Running time: 30 minutes

Original release
- Network: E!
- Release: December 15, 2002 – September 20, 2003

Star Dates is an American reality television program that aired on the E! network from 2002 to 2003.

== Overview ==
The series consisted of ordinary people going on blind dates with B-list celebrities. Butch Patrick appeared on the first show. Other celebrities who appeared included Dustin Diamond, Kim Fields, Gary Coleman, Phyllis Diller, Jill Whelan, and Jimmie Walker. Series host Jordan Black (and later Reggie Gaskins in season 2) also served as each couples chauffeur while they were on their date. Actress Robin Coleman appeared on the episode with Dustin Diamond as his date before she became well known.
