= Karen Ingenthron =

American actress

Karen I. Lewis
- Born: April 16, 1945 (age 81); Philadelphia, Pennsylvania, U.S.
- Other name: Karen Lewis
- Occupations: Actress; author; radio commentator
- Years active: 1973–1980
- Spouse: Al Lewis (m. 1984; died 2006)

Karen Ingenthron (born April 16, 1945) is an American author, actress, and radio commentator.

== Biography ==
She was born April 16, 1945, in Philadelphia and she graduated from the University of California, Berkeley with a B.A. in Dramatic Art. She later performed at the Boulder Shakespeare Festival, the American Conservatory Theater, the Magic Theater, and the Actors Repertory Theater. She was a founding member of the Berkeley Repertory Theatre, where she acted in over 50 plays.

In 1979, Ingenthron moved to New York City and appeared in a North Carolina dinner theater production of California Suite with Al Lewis. She moved to Los Angeles, where she stayed for three years, and had a role on an episode of the television series Lou Grant in 1980. Returning to New York, she married Al Lewis in 1984. After receiving an MA at Hunter College, she taught play writing at the Roosevelt Island Cultural Center for five years. In 1987, Ingenthron teamed with Gloria W. Milliken to create Eviction Intervention Services, a not-for-profit homelessness prevention agency. In 1997, she was named executive director.

== Radio show ==
WBAI, a Pacifica Network FM radio station in New York City, invited Al Lewis to create a show with Ingenthron's co-producing. In 2003, Lewis was too ill to do his show, and she took over as the host. In 2006, she received the Sister Sarah Clarke Human Rights Award.

== Filmography ==
- Lou Grant, episode "Censored" (1980), as Irene Teel
- Alabama's Ghost (1973)
- Godmonster of Indian Flats (1973) as Mariposa
