= Jo McDonnell =

American actress (born 1950)

- Born: Pamela Jo McDonnell; May 16, 1950 (age 74); Stockton, California, U.S.
- Occupation: Actress
- Spouse(s): Andrew Parker (1992–present); Walter Rhode

Jo McDonnell is an American actress.

McDonnell is perhaps best known for films and television series as The Octagon, Spiker, Semi-Tough, Dallas, T. J. Hooker and her role as the new Marilyn Munster in the 1981 television film The Munsters' Revenge.
