= Grampire =

- Directed by: David Blyth
- Written by: Michael Heath
- Produced by: Murray Newey
- Starring: Al Lewis; Justin Gocke; Milan Borich
- Cinematography: Kevin Hayward
- Edited by: David Huggett
- Music by: Jim Manzie
- Release date: 1992
- Running time: 95 min
- Country: New Zealand
- Language: English

Grampire, also known as Moonrise and My Grandpa is a Vampire, is a 1992 New Zealand film. It is directed by David Blyth and features The Munsters Al Lewis as the grandfather. It was written by Michael Heath based on his earlier radio play Moonrise. Blyth was nominated for Best Director the 1992 New Zealand Film Awards.

== Synopsis ==
A young boy visiting family in New Zealand discovers his grandfather is a friendly vampire.

== Cast ==
- Al Lewis as Vernon Cooger
- Justin Gocke as Lonny
- Milan Borich as Kanziora
- Pat Evison as Leah
- Noel Appleby as Ernie
- David Weatherley as Sargent Dicky Ticker
- Sean Duffy as Derek
- Sylvia Rands as Cheryl
- Phoebe Falconer as Tammy Kanziora
- Chris McNair as Ben

== Reception ==
Helen Martin in New Zealand film, 1912-1996 says "An affectionate, bloodless, Disneyesque romp bearing the message 'your imagination is more powerful than any movie', Grampire invites children to make up their own versions of popular stories while offering the viewer a reason for the liberties it takes with vampire myth conventions." She later notes "The narrative is overloaded with explanatory dialogue , the plot lacks tension and the humour creaks." The Press film reviewer wrote "the film is lots of fun, although it has destroyed my cherished image of vampires somewhat." Richard Scheib of Moria gave it 1 star and said "Grampire is almost saved by the classy professional photography, a striking electric blue lighting scheme, which creates an atmosphere of perpetual midnight and helps enormously in disguising the B-budget."
