= Here Come the Munsters =

1995 television film by Robert Ginty

- Release poster
- Based on: Characters by: Norm Liebmann; Ed Haas; from a format by; Allan Burns; Chris Hayward
- Written by: Bill Prady; Jim Fisher; Jim Staahl
- Directed by: Robert Ginty
- Starring: Edward Herrmann; Robert Morse; Christine Taylor; Mathew Botuchis; Troy Evans; Joel Brooks; Sean O'Bryan; Mary Woronov; Jeff Trachta; Max Grodénchik; Veronica Hamel
- Music by: Michael Skloff
- Country of origin: United States
- Original language: English

Production
- Executive producers: John Landis; Leslie Belzberg
- Producer: Michael S. Murphey
- Cinematography: Paul Maibaum
- Editors: Marshall Harvey; Dale Beldin
- Running time: 97 minutes
- Production companies: MCA Television Entertainment; Bodega Bay Productions

Original release
- Network: Fox
- Release: October 31, 1995

Related
- The Munsters film series

Here Come the Munsters is a science fiction comedy television film based on the 1960s CBS television series, The Munsters and was directed by Robert Ginty and written by Bill Prady, Jim Fisher, and Jim Staahl. The film stars Edward Herrmann, Christine Taylor, Veronica Hamel and Mathew Botuchis as the Munster family and tells the story of their arrival in the US from Transylvania. It aired on Fox on October 31, 1995.

== Plot ==
The Munster family is tired of being persecuted back in Transylvania, and on finding part of a letter from cousin Marilyn in California, decides to head to the United States. On arrival they find that Marilyn's father, Norman Hyde, is missing, and her mother Elsa Hyde is in a coma. Marilyn details this in the letter but Spot burned the mail (and the letter carrier) so this comes as a surprise to the Munsters.

The family must find out what has happened to Marilyn's father, and find a way to revive Elsa. They also have to try to live in new surroundings as they try to "fit in" in America.

It turns out that Norman was trying to find a way to make his "peaches and cream" daughter, Marilyn, look a little more like the rest of the clan, but somehow the experiment backfired and Norman Hyde became Brent Jekyll.

Brent Jekyll is running for Congress. A plank of his campaign platform is trying to get foreigners out of America. In a more sinister part of the story, it seems that Hyde was sabotaged and transformed into Jekyll purposely, to bring forward a politician without a past to whom people would listen.

As the story unfolds, the family tries to save the day. With Herman arrested and placed in jail, Grandpa creates a replica of him from spare parts and uses it to help him escape. They flee from the scene in the Munster Koach.

Grandpa takes a blood sample from Brent Jekyll and puts together a formula to change him back into Norman Hyde and the politician without a past is arrested. Norman Hyde also revives Elsa.

== Cast ==
- Edward Herrmann as Herman Munster
- Veronica Hamel as Lily Munster
- Robert Morse as Grandpa
- Christine Taylor as Marilyn Hyde
- Mathew Botuchis as Eddie Munster
- Troy Evans as Detective Warshowski
- Joel Brooks as Larry Walker
- Sean O'Bryan as Detective Cartwell
- Mary Woronov as Mrs. Dimwitty
- Jeff Trachta as Brent Jekyll
- Max Grodénchik as Norman Hyde
- Judy Gold as Elsa Munster Hyde
- Amanda Bearse as Mrs. Pearl
- Irwin Keyes as One-eyed man
- Brian George as Immigration official
- Keone Young as Ralph, the limo driver
- Francesca Smith as Monique
- Jane Carr as Cassie O'Leary
- Lynne Marie Stewart as Mrs. Waffer
- Dee Wallace as Mrs. Walker (uncredited)

Additionally, the four surviving cast members of the Munsters: Yvonne De Carlo, Al Lewis, Butch Patrick and Pat Priest make cameos as restaurant guests.

== Release ==
Here Come the Munsters aired on Fox on October 31, 1995. The film was uploaded in high-definition on The Munsters official YouTube channel on November 17, 2023.

== See also ==
- Mockingbird Lane, a 2012 TV special originally intended as a pilot for a reimagined Munsters series.
