= The Two Little Bears =

1961 film

- Theatrical release poster
- Directed by: Randall Hood
- Screenplay by: George W. George
- Story by: George W. George; Judy George
- Produced by: George W. George
- Starring: Eddie Albert; Jane Wyatt; Soupy Sales; Butch Patrick; Donnie Carter; Jimmy Boyd
- Cinematography: Floyd Crosby
- Edited by: Carl Pierson
- Music by: Henry Vars
- Production company: Associated Producers Inc
- Distributed by: 20th Century Fox
- Release date: November 1, 1961
- Running time: 81 minutes
- Country: United States
- Language: English

The Two Little Bears is a 1961 American comedy film directed in CinemaScope by Randall Hood, written by George W. George, and starring Eddie Albert, Jane Wyatt, Soupy Sales, Butch Patrick, Donnie Carter and Jimmy Boyd. The film was released on November 1, 1961, by 20th Century Fox.

The film was known as The Teddy Bears.

The film was the directorial debut of Randy Hood who was assistant to Maury Dexter, head of Robert L. Lippert's production company.

== Plot ==
Harry Davis, principal of the Burberry Elementary School, is concerned because his two little boys wish they were bears. One day, the two boys meet an old gypsy who tells them to use a magic cream and teaches them a spell to turn themselves into bears. When they find their sister's strange freckle cream, they do become bears. Unfortunately, when they turn back into boys, no one will believe their story.

== Cast ==
- Eddie Albert as Harry Davis
- Jane Wyatt as Anne Davis
- Soupy Sales as Officer McGovern
- Butch Patrick as Billy Davis
- Donnie Carter as Timmy Davis
- Jimmy Boyd as Johnny Dillion
- Nancy Kulp as Emily Wilkins
- Theodore Marcuse as Janos
- Milton Parsons as Dr. Fredricks
- James Maloney as Jefferson Stander
- Emory Parnell as Grimshaw Wilkins
- Jack Finch as Psychiatrist
- Opal Euard as Fortuneteller
- Jack Lester as Phil Wade
- Richard Alden as Tom Provost
- Charlene Brooks as Mary Jerdens
- Brenda Lee as Tina Davis

== Production ==
Filming took place in May 1961.

Robert L. Lippert announced plans for a sequel but it appears to not have been made.

Brenda Lee sang two songs in the film, "Honey Bear" over the opening titles and "Speak to Me Pretty", which was a hit when it was released on a single. However, for some reason, "Honey Bear" was not released on disc at the time and remains unreleased to this day. The film was not released in the UK until late 1962, when it went out on release as the lower half of a double-bill with Five Weeks in a Balloon.
