= Jeff Daniel Phillips =

American actor and filmmaker

- Born: Jeffrey Daniel Phillips; Chicago, Illinois
- Occupations: Actor, filmmaker
- Years active: 1991–present
- Height: 6’5”
- Website: jeffdanielphillips.com

Jeffrey Daniel Phillips is an American actor. He is best known for playing a caveman in a popular series of GEICO commercials.

== Career ==
He played the part of Maurice in the short-lived Cavemen sitcom on ABC. His other credits include Hide (2003), for which he was the director, producer, and co-author in addition to being a cast member; parts in Sneakers and Rob Zombie's Halloween II as Uncle Seymour, The Lords of Salem and 31; and roles in TV series Flaked, Arrest and Trial, Philly, and Profiler. He appeared in the second season of Agents of S.H.I.E.L.D. as David A. Angar, the Marvel Cinematic Universe version of Angar the Screamer.

== Selected filmography ==
Film roles
Year	Title	Role	Notes
1991	Son of Darkness: To Die For II	Policeman	Uncredited
1992	Sneakers	Playtronics Perimeter Guard	
1992	Peephole	Psychological Mugger	
2003	Hide	Larkin	Short film
2006	Unknown	Iron Cross	
2007	Zodiac	Informant	Uncredited
2009	Elsewhere	Officer Berg	
2009	Halloween II	Howard / Uncle Seymour Coffins	
2009	Convict	Deputy Larson	
2010	Holiday with Mommy	Uncle Seymour	Short film
2010	Faster	Cohort #2	
2010	A Sweet Set	Uncle Coffins	Short film
2010	Errand_boy	Benny	Short film
2012	The Lords of Salem	Herman 'Whitey' Salvador	
2013	Carlos Spills the Beans	Stosh	
2013	Glow	Roland	Short film
2014	Dr. Jeckel and Mr. Coffins	Mr. Coffins	Short film
2015	We Found Footage	Steven	Short film
2015	The Weight of Blood and Bones	Sol White	Short film
2015	Freaks of Nature	Actor	Uncredited
2016	Irwindale	Kirby Reed	Short film
2016	31	Roscoe Pepper	
2016	Happy Birthday	Frank Zappa	
2016	There Shall Come Angels	Bearded Man	Short film
2017	Psychopaths	Storyteller	
2017	The Ice Cream Truck	Delivery Man	
2019	Burning Dog	Oliver	
2019	Satanic Panic	Steve Larson	
2019	3 from Hell	Warden Virgil Dallas Harper	
2019	Undercover Brother 2	Actor	
2020	Becoming	Glen Hemming	
2020	An American Pickle	Actor	Uncredited
2022	Mosquito	Newt	
2022	The Munsters	Herman Munster, Shecky Von Rathbone, Zombo	
2022	Christmas Bloody Christmas	Sheriff Monroe	

Television roles
Year	Title	Role	Notes
1997	Beyond Belief: Fact or Fiction	Homeless Man	1 episode (segment: "The Diner")
1997	Profiler	Dan Torpton	Episode: "Primal Scream"
2000	Arrest & Trial	Jason Brumwell	Episode: "Dari Mart Death"
2001	Philly	Witness	Episode: "Philly Folly"
2006	Standoff	Neil Van Sickle	Episode: "Heroine"
2007–2008	Cavemen	Maurice	Main cast
2009	Trust Me	Hal the Blind Date	Episode: "What's the Rush?"
2010	CSI: Miami	Photo Assistant	Episode: "L.A."
2014	Futurestates	The Foreman	Episode: "As You Were"
2015	Agents of S.H.I.E.L.D.	David A. Angar	Episode: "One of Us"
2016	Westworld	Tenderloin	4 episodes
2016–2017	Flaked	Uno	3 episodes
2017	APB	Duke Johnson	Episode: "Fueling Fires"
2017	Claws	Circus	3 episodes
2017–2018	The Gifted	Tex / Fade	Recurring
2024–present	Dexter: Original Sin	Levi Reed	Recurring
