= Hilary Van Dyke =

American actress and singer

Hilary Van Dyke (born October 30, 1970) is an American former actress and singer.

== Early years ==
Van Dyke was born in Camarillo, California to Bruce and Judy Van Dyke.

== Career ==
Before landing the role of Marilyn Munster in The Munsters Today,, she made one commercial (for Kentucky Fried Chicken) As Munster, Van Dyke replaced actress Mary Ellen Dunbar in the original pilot episode, and went on to appear in 72 episodes from 1988-1991. Her feature film debut was as a night-club dancer in Deadly Addiction (1988). She also starred as Joan of Arc in an episode of Life Goes On (1990) and Joanna in the TV series What A Dummy (1990).
