= Ester Wier =

American writer (1910–2000)

- Born: October 17, 1910 United States
- Died: January 6, 2000 (aged 89) United States
- Language: English
- Genre: Fiction, children's literature

Ester Wier (October 17, 1910 – January 6, 2000) was an American writer.

She was born Esther Catherine Wier to Robert A. and Lydia (née Harshberger) Alberti in Seattle, Washington. She married Henry Robert Wier, a naval officer, in 1934, Her first books used her experiences traveling as a naval wife. She took a workshop at George Washington University which led to her writing for children.

== Bibliography ==
- Answer Book on Naval Social Customs, 1956 (with Dorothy Coffin Hickey)
- Answer Book on Air Force Social Customs, 1957
- Army Social Customs, 1958
- What Every Air Force Wife Should Know, 1958
- The Loner, 1963
- Gift of the Mountains, 1963
- The Rumptydoolers, 1964
- Easy Does It, 1965
- The Barrel, 1966
- The Space Hut, 1967
- The Wind Chasers, 1967
- Action at Paradise Marsh, 1968
- The Winners, 1968
- The Long Year, 1969
- The Straggler: Adventures of a Sea Bird, 1970
- The White Oak, 1971
- The Partners, 1972
- The Hunting Trail, 1974
- King of the Mountain, 1975
