= The Loner (children's novel) =

1963 book by Ester Wier

- First edition
- Author: Ester Wier
- Language: English
- Genre: Young adult fiction
- Publisher: David McKay
- Publication date: 1963
- Publication place: United States
- Media type: Print
- Pages: 160 pp

The Loner is a 1963 adolescent novel by author Ester Wier. The Loner was a recipient of the Newbery Honor award in 1964.

== Plot ==
A young orphan boy, whose name, age, and background are unknown in the beginning of the book, is struggling to make ends meet for himself. He bounces from migrant family to migrant family, surviving by picking crops, but he makes no profit due to his wages being taken by the families he stays with. Near the beginning of the book, he makes his first friend, a girl named Raidy. Raidy befriends him and says he should have a name. Before she can decide on one, their friendship is cut short when Raidy dies in a farming accident.

Exhausted, hungry, and distraught over his only friend's death, the boy takes off on his own and collapses onto the ground without knowing or caring where he is or if he will survive. He is in Montana, where he is found by a woman named "Boss" and her dog Jupiter. Boss is a modern-day shepherd, tending a flock of 900 sheep with the help of two dogs, and she brings the boy to her camp, caring for him until he recovers.

Boss's camp tender, Tex explains to the boy how Boss's son, Ben, was killed by a bear and that Boss sometimes hunts the bear that killed her son. He talks to the boy, motivating him to keep the place clean and do what Ben would have done for Boss. Pointing to a random page in the Bible, the boy chooses the name "David," which Boss takes a sign that she is supposed to help him (David was also a shepherd). Angie, Ben's widow, brings David some of Ben's old clothing, gives him a haircut, and intends to teach him how to read and write.

Throughout the story there is a pattern: each person that David meets expresses interest in helping him. David is understandably quite skeptical of people's intentions and feels like he's only a stray or a burden. However, he grows from a loner to someone who welcomes love and other people into his life. He also learns about the give and take of civilization, and how to handle the responsibility of caring for Boss's sheep and doing chores as he accepts help from others to meet his own needs and overcome his hardships.

== Main characters ==
- David – A young loner without a name in the beginning, He is the titular main character of the novel.
- Boss – David's caretaker who can feed, help, and name him. Has recently lost her adult son, Ben, after he is killed by a bear.
- Tex – Camp tender. Brings supplies to the camp and befriends David.
- Angie – Ben's widow. Teaches David how to write his name and provides him with some of Ben's' clothing.
- Raidy – David's first friend. Killed accidentally after being sucked into a machine.
- Ben – Boss's son who was killed by a bear.

== Critical reception ==
Kirkus Reviews expressed that "Young boys who yearn for independence, should find the boy's unique life intriguing".

== Awards ==
- Newbery Honor in 1964.
