= Pat Priest (actress) =

American actress (born 1936)

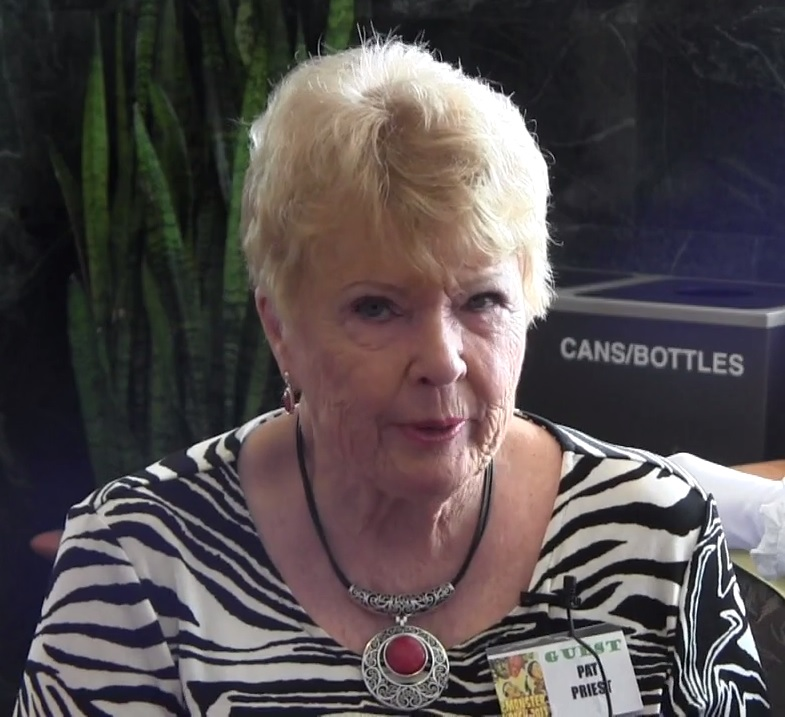
- Priest in 2013, interviewed by Count Gore de Vol
- Born: Patricia Ann Priest; August 15, 1936 (age 90); Bountiful, Utah, U.S.
- Occupation: Actress
- Years active: 1963–1976, 2022–present
- Spouses: Pierce Jensen Jr. (m. 1955; div. 1967); Frederick Hansing (m. 1981; died 2023)
- Children: 2
- Mother: Ivy Baker Priest

Patricia Ann Priest (born August 15, 1936) is an American actress known for being the second person to portray Marilyn Munster on the television show The Munsters (1964–1966) after the original actress, Beverley Owen, left after 13 episodes.

== Early life ==
Priest was born and raised in Bountiful, Utah. Her father was Roy Priest and her mother, Ivy Baker Priest, was the United States Treasurer from January 28, 1953, to January 29, 1961, having been appointed to the role by President Dwight Eisenhower. American paper currency printed during Ivy Baker Priest's tenure bore her signature. Priest resided in Washington, D.C., with her mother. She graduated in 1954 from Washington-Lee High School in Arlington, Virginia. She is also a graduate of Marjorie Webster Junior College.

As a benefit of the influence of her mother, Priest served as a page girl at the 1952 Republican National Convention.

Priest was crowned as the first International Azalea Festival Queen in Norfolk, Virginia, in 1954.

== Career ==
=== Show business ===
Early in her career, Priest worked as a singer and actress on local television stations, including WTTG in Washington, D.C. In the late 1950s, she acted in stage productions, including Bus Stop and The Tender Trap.

Priest replaced actress Beverley Owen on the television sitcom The Munsters; Owen departed the series after the first 13 episodes in order to get married. Marilyn's character was a running gag, as she was a beautiful blonde treated as the ugly member of a family composed of a Frankenstein's monster for an uncle, a vampire for an aunt, a vampire for a grandfather, and a werewolf for a cousin.

The studio replaced Priest with Debbie Watson (12 years Priest's junior) in the role of Marilyn Munster in the 1966 feature Munster, Go Home! (1966), as Watson was under contract to the studio, which had plans to make her a film star.

After the series ended, Priest appeared on episodes of television programs such as Bewitched, Perry Mason, Death Valley Days and The Mary Tyler Moore Show, in which she played Sue Ann Nivens's unappreciated younger sister.

Priest's film roles included Looking for Love (1964) with Connie Francis, Easy Come, Easy Go (1967) with Elvis Presley, the horror film The Incredible Two-Headed Transplant (1971) with Bruce Dern and Some Call It Loving (1973) starring Zalman King.

=== After acting ===
Priest retired from acting in the 1980s, but continues to attend some of the nostalgia conventions and Munsters revivals around the country.

She had previously restored and sold homes in Idaho, where she has lived for over two decades, before retiring.

== Personal life ==
Priest was married to dentist Frederick Hansing from 1981 until his death in 2023. She has two sons with her first husband, Pierce Jensen Jr.

In 2001, Priest was diagnosed with non-Hodgkin's lymphoma. She finished maintenance treatments at St. Luke's Mountain States Tumor Institute and was later determined to be in remission.

== Filmography ==
Film
Year	Title	Role	Notes
1964	Looking for Love	Waitress	Uncredited
1964	Quick, Before It Melts	Stewardess	Uncredited
1967	Easy Come, Easy Go	Dina Bishop	
1970	Airport	Mrs. Jerry Copeland - Passenger	Uncredited
1971	The Incredible 2-Headed Transplant	Linda	
1973	Some Call It Loving	Carnival Nurse	
2022	The Munsters	Transylvania Airlines Announcer	

Television
Year	Title	Role	Notes
1963	The Lieutenant	Diane	"To Take Up Serpents"
1963	The Lieutenant	Waitress	"Fall from a White Horse"
1964	The Jack Benny Program	1st Dancer	"Jack and Dennis Do Impersonations"
1964	Bob Hope Presents the Chrysler Theatre	Miss March	"Her School for Bachelors"
1964, 66	Perry Mason	Sally Young	"The Case of the Tandem Target"
1964, 66	Perry Mason	Norma Fenn	"The Case of the Crafty Kidnapper"
1964	Valentine's Day	Lola	"The Life You Save Is Yours"
1964	Voyage to the Bottom of the Sea	Karen Joyce Pennell	"The Price of Doom"
1964	Wendy and Me	Betty Allison	"Jeff, the Senior Citizen"
1964–65	Death Valley Days	Nancy	"The Left Hand Is Damned"
1964–65	Death Valley Days	Nora Jackson	"The Wild West's Biggest Train Holdup"
1964	Dr. Kildare	Student Nurse	"A Candle in the Window"
1964	My Favorite Martian	Della Darwell	"My Uncle the Folk Singer"
1964–66	The Munsters	Marilyn Munster	Main role (57 episodes & "Marineland Carnival" special)
1966, 68	The Red Skelton Show	Tessie Torso	"Our Man Fink"
1966, 68	The Red Skelton Show	Ruby – San Fernando's Assistant	"San Fernando: Man with a Heart of Stolen Gold"
1966, 68	The Red Skelton Show	Generous Woman in Park / Wax Figure-Silent Spot	"Guess Whose Dinner Is Coming to Freddie?"
1966	The Lucy Show	Stewardess	"Lucy Flies to London"
1967	Mannix	Louise Carter	"Beyond the Shadow of a Dream"
1968	Run for Your Life	Susan	"Beware My Love"
1969	Ironside	Goldie	"Alias Mr. Braithwaite"
1969	The Virginian	Mary Lou	"The Substitute"
1969–70	Bewitched	Mrs. Goodall	"And Something Makes Four"
1969–70	Bewitched	Nurse	"Samantha's Lost Weekend"
1969–70	Bewitched	Ruthie Campbell	"Just a Kid Again"
1971	Mission: Impossible	Kathrine Berat	"The Field"
1974	Run, Joe, Run	Grace Gilbert	"Blind Girl"
1976	The Mary Tyler Moore Show	Lila Nivens	"Sue Ann's Sister"
1995	Here Come the Munsters	Restaurant Guest	TV movie
