= Marilyn Munster =

Fictional character in The Munsters

- The Munsters character
- Beverley Owen as Marilyn in the first season of The Munsters
- First appearance: "Munster Masquerade"
- Last appearance: "A Visit from the Teacher"
- Portrayed by: Beverley Owen (1964); Pat Priest (1964–1966); Debbie Watson (1966); Jo McDonnell (1981); Mary Ellen Dunbar (1988); Hilary Van Dyke (1988–1991); Christine Taylor (1995); Elaine Hendrix (1996); Charity Wakefield (2012)

Marilyn Munster is a fictional character in the CBS sitcom The Munsters, originally played by Beverley Owen and later by Pat Priest. In the original series, she is the daughter of Lily Munster's sister, and is therefore the granddaughter of Grandpa Munster (Count Dracula) and the cousin of Eddie Munster. She was played by Hilary Van Dyke in the 1988 series The Munsters Today.

== Description ==
Marilyn is Lily's niece, although her surname is Munster. She attends Westbury College in Mockingbird Heights, the city where the Munsters live.

Like the rest of her family, she believes that the Munsters' appearance and lifestyle are normal, although Marilyn is actually the only family member whose appearance does not shock or disturb people outside the family. She is considered attractive by outsiders, but by the aesthetic standards of her family she is distressingly unattractive. Marilyn laments that she keeps scaring away potential boyfriends, not realizing that the young men are frightened away by her family.

== Actresses ==
In the original series Marilyn was played in the first thirteen episodes by Beverly Owen, who left because she married and moved to New York, and then by Pat Priest starting with the fourteenth episode.

Marilyn was also played by Debbie Watson in the 1966 film Munster, Go Home!, Jo McDonnell in the 1981 film The Munsters' Revenge, Hilary Van Dyke in the 1988–1991 series The Munsters Today (replacing Mary Ellen Dunbar, who appeared in the unaired pilot episode), Christine Taylor in the 1995 film Here Come the Munsters, Elaine Hendrix in the 1996 film The Munsters' Scary Little Christmas, and Charity Wakefield in NBC's 2012 pilot Mockingbird Lane.
