= Herman Munster =

Fictional character in The Munsters

- The Munsters character
- Fred Gwynne as Herman Munster
- First appearance: "Munster Masquerade" (television series)
- Last appearance: The Munsters (2022 film)
- Portrayed by: Fred Gwynne (1964–1966; 1981); Richard Long (1973); John Schuck (1988–1991); Edward Herrmann (1995); Sam McMurray (1996); Jerry O'Connell (2012); Jeff Daniel Phillips (2022 film)

In-universe information
- Species: Simulacrum
- Occupation: Gravedigger and Funeral parlor employee
- Spouse: Lily Munster
- Children: Eddie Munster
- Relatives: Charlie Munster (twin brother); Marilyn Munster (niece); Grandpa (father-in-law)

Herman Munster is a fictional character in the CBS sitcom The Munsters, originally played by Fred Gwynne. The patriarch of the Munster household, Herman is one of the Frankenstein monsters created in a lab in Germany in the nineteenth century.

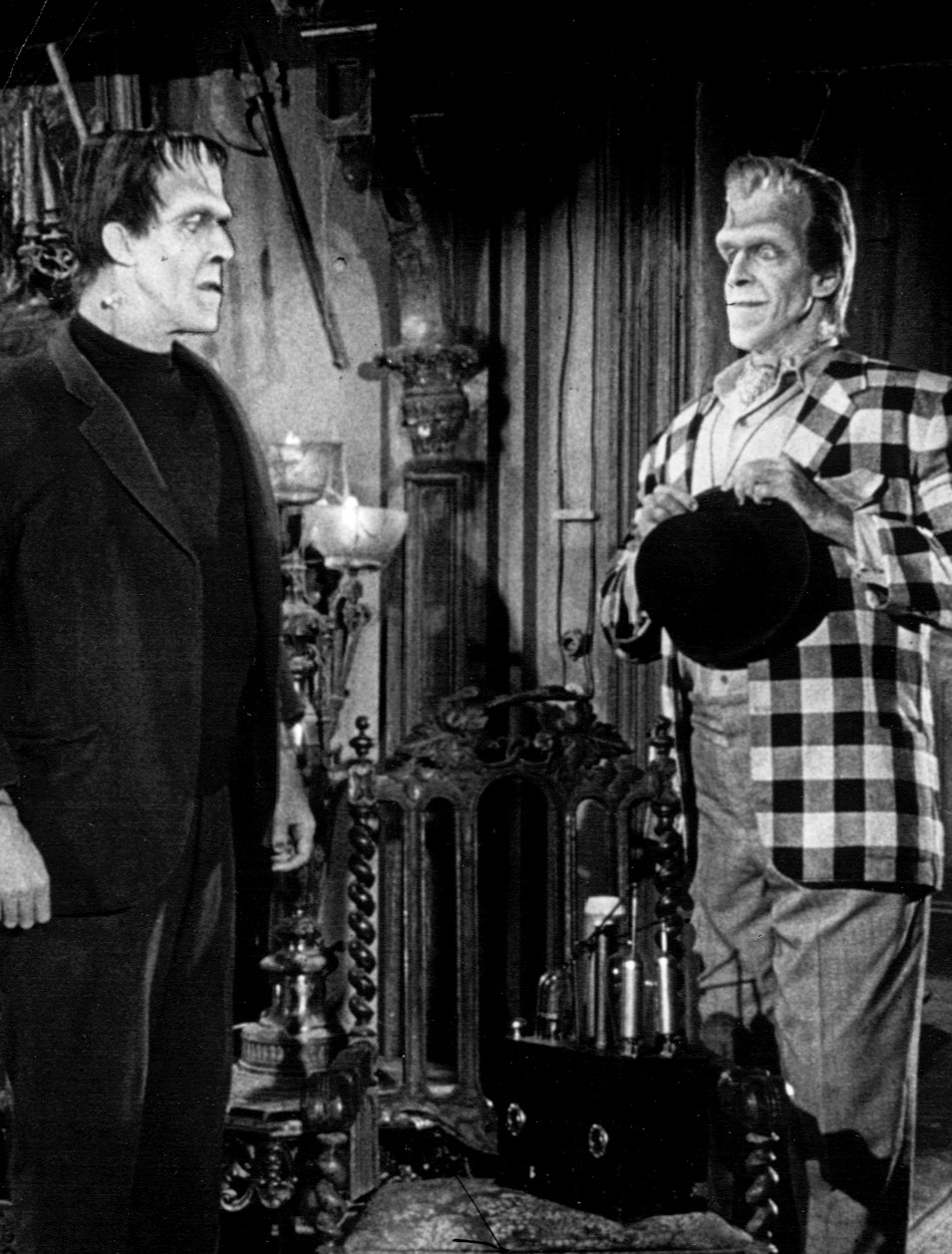
Herman Munster and brother Charlie (both played by Fred Gwynne)

== Origins ==
In the context of the series, Herman was created in 1815 at the University of Heidelberg by Dr. Victor Frankenstein. He has a twin brother, Charlie. Leaving (Germany) for Great Britain at a young age, Herman was adopted by the Munsters of Munster Hall, a noble family living in the fictitious Shroudshire, England.

At some point Herman moved to Transylvania (a region in Romania), where he met Lily Dracula. In 1865 (technically at the age of 15, but physically older) Herman married Lily, and eventually the couple and Grandpa (Lily's father) moved to America, where Herman joined the U.S. Army, fighting in World War II. In episode 34, Grandpa says that it was thanks to Herman that he was able to leave Transylvania and have a better life in America.

== Family relations ==
In The Munsters Today, he, as now portrayed by John Schuck, is given a younger brother named Frank. And in the 1995 movie Here Come the Munsters he is given a sister named Elsa who resembles the Bride of Frankenstein. She is also married to Mr. Hyde, who transforms into Dr. Jekyll.

== In the series ==
Herman is employed by Gateman, Goodbury and Graves, a funeral home in Mockingbird Heights, having started out as a "box boy c. 1953." Herman's co-workers sometimes remark on his height and strength, but otherwise do not appear to find his appearance and color (green) out of the ordinary. Occasionally, Herman is picked up by "the company car" (a hearse), which he climbs into via the back door and rides as if he were a body being delivered.

== Description ==
Herman is a lovable, good-natured, and clumsy buffoon. Despite having been alive for over a century, he behaves rather childishly, often throwing temper tantrums, punctuated with thundering animalish roaring. In spite of his childish behaviors, he is a caring father figure to his son Eddie and a loving, devoted husband. He is very kind to everyone, but he is also very naive, often misunderstanding situations or falling for various schemes. He occasionally has problems recognizing when someone has malicious or dishonest intentions towards him. Most people, however, flee in terror on seeing Herman's monstrous visage, which he always attributes to something else. In some instances, his presence has caused inanimate objects or artwork to come to life and flee in terror: such as a statue of Daniel Boone in a park, a stuffed gorilla in a museum, and a graffiti drawing of a face in a jail cell starting out smiling and the facial expression changes to terror.

Herman is incredibly strong, once lifting a solid metal demolition ball (and another time, a Volkswagen) casually with one hand. He is almost immovable; a number of times, cars have run into him without causing him injury. A safe fell on his head ("John Doe Munster") and gave him amnesia, although it did not hurt him. When asked how much he weighs, Herman says: "Three spins", meaning the dial on the scale goes around three times. In the episode "Herman's Lawsuit", his driver's license gives his weight as 380 pounds (170 kg), height as 7 ft 6 in (2.29 m), and eyes as brown. (On the other hand, in the episode "All-Star Munster," Herman, when asked his height, states "seven-foot three" but when asked how tall he is in his stocking feet, he replies, "Seven foot four – I wear very thick socks.") In the episode "Munster the Magnificent", his shoe size is said to be 26. Herman considers himself handsome (as does the rest of his family) even though he can crack a mirror by looking at it, once even cracking a shiny frying pan he looked into. In one episode, Herman is struck by lightning, reverting to a "hideous" form (actually Fred Gwynne without any make-up). He tries to hide his appearance from all those around him until two more lightning strikes make him a woman first and then the second one reverts him back to "handsome" Herman. In earlier episodes, Herman has hair on the back of his hands (only seen in closeups). And a common joke is that when he shakes hands with a blind neighbor of his, they believe that they are holding a dog's paw.

When frustrated (often), he tends to stamp like a child having a tantrum causing plaster to shower down from the ceiling. His strength is especially useful around "the Parlor" – he can lift occupied caskets unassisted. Herman has a very distinctive laugh;... a loud braying bellow. Occasionally he is shown grunting and making guttural sounds (similar to Boris Karloff's Frankenstein's monster), usually when he's hungry, impatient or getting annoyed over a minor problem (such as finding his Sunday newspaper).

In keeping with his childlike personality, Herman loves balloons, candy, and especially his wife Lily's pancakes. He plays with toys, such as his son Eddie's cowboy hat and cap pistols (in "Herman's Happy Valley"). He loves to read comic books despite Lily's annoyance at such childish behavior.

Despite being of German origin and having been raised in England, Herman speaks with a cultured American accent. He does however read German newspapers, which is subtly shown in at least one episode: He is reading a paper, conversing about an unrelated topic, and as the camera gets close enough to his face, it can be seen for a fraction of a second that it is Die Zeit. In episode "My Fair Munster", he reads Die Welt.

== Merchandising ==
In 1964 Mattel released a Herman Munster doll that featured Gwynne's voice and spoke ten phrases at random with the pull of its "Chatty Ring" cord. This was a spin-off of their highly successful Chatty Cathy doll, for whom the talking mechanism had been invented.
