= Eddie Munster =

Fictional character on The Munsters

- The Munsters character
- Butch Patrick as Eddie Munster with his doll Woof-Woof
- First appearance: "Munster Masquerade"
- Last appearance: Munster, Go Home! (by Butch Patrick); Mockingbird Lane (final)
- Portrayed by: Happy Derman (1964, unaired pilot); Butch Patrick (1964–66); Bobby Diamond (1973); K. C. Martel (1981); Jason Marsden (1988–91); Mathew Botuchis (1995); Bug Hall (1996); Mason Cook (2012)

In-universe information
- Gender: Male
- Relatives: Herman Munster (father); Lily Munster (mother); Sam Dracula (grandfather); Marilyn Munster (cousin); Charlie Munster (uncle)

Eddie Munster is a fictional character on the CBS sitcom The Munsters. He was portrayed by Butch Patrick in all episodes of the original series except for the pilot, where he was portrayed by Happy Derman. The only child of Herman and Lily Munster, Eddie is wolf-like. The role was later played by Jason Marsden in The Munsters Today.

== Description ==
Eddie is a typical boy apart from being a werewolf. He is very proud of his father, repeatedly bragging about Herman's abilities. Eddie volunteers Herman for something which is clearly beyond Herman's capabilities, but one Herman nonetheless undertakes for Eddie's sake, in several episodes.

== Production ==
In the unaired pilot episode, the part was played by Nate "Happy" Derman. Butch Patrick played him in the original series.

When asked how he was selected for role of Eddie, Patrick said: "I had a lot of experience. But maybe it was because my fangs were my own teeth. My teeth were so bad, that even when I closed my mouth they stuck out. I was about a head smaller than the other kids, and they liked that because it played off Herman's height."

Eddie was played by Jason Marsden in The Munsters Today. In the first season of that series, Eddie was 10 years old and in the fourth grade. He wore the same outfit that Butch Patrick wore. In seasons two and three, Eddie was depicted as being high-school aged and his wardrobe became increasingly modernized.
