= Munster, Go Home! =

1966 American comedy film directed by Earl Bellamy

- Theatrical release poster
- Directed by: Earl Bellamy
- Written by: Joe Connelly; Bob Mosher; George Tibbles; Earl Bellamy
- Produced by: Joe Connelly; Bob Mosher
- Starring: Fred Gwynne; Yvonne De Carlo; Al Lewis; Butch Patrick
- Cinematography: Benjamin H. Kline
- Edited by: Bud S. Isaacs
- Music by: Jack Marshall
- Color process: Technicolor
- Production company: Universal Pictures
- Distributed by: Universal Pictures
- Release dates: June 15, 1966 (New York City); August 6, 1966 (United States)
- Running time: 96 minutes
- Country: United States
- Language: English
- Budget: $600,000

Munster, Go Home! is a 1966 American comedy film based on the 1960s family sitcom The Munsters. It was directed by Earl Bellamy, who also directed a number of episodes in the series. The film was produced immediately after the television series completed filming its original run; it included the original cast with the exception of Marilyn. Marilyn was played by Debbie Watson, replacing Pat Priest from the series.

== Plot ==
Herman Munster (Fred Gwynne) and his wife, Lily (Yvonne De Carlo), learn from Cavanaugh Munster's will that they have inherited an English manor known as Munster Hall in Shroudshire, England, and that Herman has inherited the designation Lord of the manor as "Lord Munster". The family boards the famous American transatlantic passenger ocean liner SS United States to England. Herman gets seasick, Marilyn (Debbie Watson) encounters a new love and suitor Roger Moresby (Robert Pine). Grandpa (Al Lewis) gets turned into a grey wolf upon accidentally consuming a wolf pill and has to be sneaked through British immigration and customs.

Cousins Grace (Jeanne Arnold) and Freddie (Terry-Thomas) are furious that the American Munsters are getting the manor, and that Herman will be Lord Munster instead of Freddie. Grace and Freddie, with the help of their mother, Lady Effigie (Hermione Gingold), try to get rid of the Munsters, so the estate can be theirs. The American Munster couple feels right at home when Herman's English relatives try to scare them. Freddie disguises himself as a ghost, but screams and runs away when he encounters Herman. Grandpa sneaks out of bed to find out the secret of Munster Hall: a counterfeiting operation is at work in the basement operated by a mastermind known as the Gryphon.

Later, Herman enters a race, driving Grandpa's custom dragster, the "DRAG-U-LA". Grace and Freddie plot to kill Herman to stop him from winning the race; thanks to the Gryphon posing as Roger, but with Lily's help, he wins. The British Munsters and their butler, Cruikshank (John Carradine) including his daughter, Millie the barmaid revealed to be the Gryphon who sought to become Lady Munster, are all exposed and apprehended by the police. Herman captures Freddie and Grace by tossing tires on them. Lady Effigie is sent to Shroudshire's police station with her butler by Lily and Eddie (Butch Patrick). Herman and his family donate the land and Munster Hall to the city for historic preservation. Roger and Marilyn get together and hope to see each other again. Herman and his family head for their American home.

== Cast ==
- Fred Gwynne as Herman Munster
- Yvonne De Carlo as Lily Munster
- Al Lewis as Grandpa
- Butch Patrick as Eddie Munster
- Debbie Watson as Marilyn Munster
- Terry-Thomas as Freddie Munster
- Hermione Gingold as Lady Effigie Munster
- Robert Pine as Roger Moresby
- John Carradine as Cruikshank
- Bernard Fox as Squire Lester Moresby
- Richard Dawson as Joey
- Jeanne Arnold as Grace Munster
- Maria Lennard as Millie Cruikshank
- Cliff Norton as Herbert
- Diana Chesney as Mrs. Moresby
- Arthur Malet as Alfie
- Ben Wright as Hennesy

== Production ==
=== Development ===
This film offered audiences an opportunity to see the Munsters in Technicolor rather than the black-and-white format of the television series, but was not a commercial success upon its original theatrical release. It was produced and released at least partly in order to introduce the characters and concept to foreign audiences, as it came in advance of international syndication for the film's source material (the television series' 70 episodes).

For the Transatlantic crossing, stock footage of the American passenger ocean liner, the SS United States, near the end of its active career, was utilized. Although most of the film is set in fictional "Shroudshire, England" the automobile racing scenes were shot at the Paramount Ranch Racetrack in Agoura, California. They featured the "DRAG-U-LA" custom dragster designed by famous auto customizer George Barris.

== Home media ==
In 1997, GoodTimes Entertainment released Munster, Go Home! on VHS alongside the 1981 made-for-TV reunion movie The Munsters' Revenge. The VHS version of Munster, Go Home! is presented in an open matte 1:33:1 aspect ratio. In 2001, GoodTimes Entertainment released a DVD version of the film using the same transfer. In 2006, Universal Home Entertainment released a two-feature DVD featuring Munster, Go Home! and The Munsters' Revenge. The Universal transfer is sourced from an original print and presented in its original theatrical 1.85:1 aspect ratio.

It was made available in Region 4 on DVD in September 2016.

It was released on blu-ray through Shout Factory on March 31, 2020.

== See also ==
- List of American films of 1966
