= Grandpa (The Munsters) =

- The Munsters character
- Al Lewis as Grandpa in The Munsters
- First appearance: "Munster Masquerade" (September 24, 1964)
- Portrayed by: Al Lewis (1964–1966; 1973; 1981); Nina Shipman (1965 “Lily Munster - Girl Model”); Howard Morton (1988–1991); Robert Morse (1995); Sandy Baron (1996); Eddie Izzard (2012); Daniel Roebuck (2022 film)

In-universe information
- Species: Vampire
- Relatives: Yorga (brother); Lily Munster (daughter); Lester (Son); Herman Munster (son-in-law); Marilyn Munster (granddaughter); Eddie Munster (grandson)

Count Sam Dracula, commonly known as Grandpa, (Note: In popular culture the character is often colloquially referred to as "Grandpa Munster", although this is incorrect as Munster is not his surname.) is a fictional character from the American sitcom The Munsters, originally played by Al Lewis. He is a vampire and the doting, irritable, and sarcastic father of Lily Munster. The role was later played by Howard Morton in the 1980s television series The Munsters Today.

== Character background ==
The character's full name is given as "Sam Dracula, Count of Transylvania". A running gag in both the original series and follow up The Munsters Today is his extreme age—his car, the DRAG-U-LA, bearing his gravestone, reads "born 1367–?". Grandpa talks of having personally known various figures throughout history, including Nero, King Arthur, Richard the Lionheart and Jack the Ripper. Grandpa declares his age as 378 years in the episode "Grandpa's Lost Wife", placing his date of birth around 1588. In The Munsters Today episode "Its My Party and I'll Die if I Want To", Grandpa celebrates his 402nd birthday. The family uses a time machine and brings back significant people from his life, including his friend Genghis Khan, brother Yorga (played by Sandy Baron who played Grandpa in the 1995 TV movie The Munsters' Scary Little Christmas), a former girlfriend "Shirley Zlebnik", and his overbearing mother (played by actress Ruth Buzzi).

In the episode "Munster Masquerade", Grandpa describes having been married "167 times", and although his wives are "all dead", he still keeps "in touch with them". Grandpa's last wife, Katja, who is also Lily's mother, makes an emotional appearance in The Munsters Today in the 1990 episode "Once in a Blue Moon". She also appears in a photograph in the original series which was taken during Herman and Lily's wedding.

Grandpa's identity as Count Dracula is alluded to in both the original series and The Munsters Today. In the 1965 episode "The Musician", Mr. Gateman refers to him as "Count Dracula" when he comes to dinner. In "The Fregosi Emerald", Grandpa refers to himself as Count Dracula to an operator in Transylvania. He is also referred to as "The Count" various times in The Munsters Today, most notably in the season one episode "Farewell Grandpa", when the family find out he isn't an American citizen, with the threat of being deported back to Transylvania by the U.S. government. In the episodes “Herman's Rival” and "Happy 100th Anniversary", Lily notes her maiden name is Dracula. Throughout The Munsters Today, Grandpa is referred to as "Vladimir Dracula".

== Description ==
Grandpa keeps a laboratory in the cellar of the house, and often refers to "going down to the lab." The potions and magic spells he devises there are central to many of the show's stories. Many of his inventions are less than successful, but he never stops thinking up new ones.

Grandpa can transform himself into a wolf or a bat, as per Bram Stoker's Dracula. In "Herman's Sorority Caper" and Munster, Go Home! it is revealed that he takes special pills to turn himself into these creatures. In later episodes, however, and in all episodes of The Munsters Today he changes to and from a bat simply at will.

Grandpa has an extremely sarcastic personality, and often insults his son-in-law, Herman. Despite this, Grandpa and Herman are quite close; in one episode, Lily says that if not for Herman, Grandpa would be "living in a cave picking fleas out of his wings". Many episodes of The Munsters revolve around the zany schemes Grandpa and Herman concoct, which either end successfully or result in Lily scolding the two for their failure.

While Grandpa is generally considered the wisest member of the family, he also has a decidedly stubborn streak. If he feels he isn't getting his due respect, he will let everyone know it, and often sulk or go to extreme lengths to demonstrate his offense at a perceived slight. While generally a successful mad scientist and magician, his experiments tend to be comically absurd, in keeping with the genre.

Grandpa is depicted as a goofish yet loveable mad scientist. He has a pet bat named Igor who "hangs around" in Grandpa's lab. And much like a bat, Grandpa sleeps hanging upside down from the ceiling: usually in the living room, the attic, or the lab (the interior of his bedroom was shown in the season one episode "My Fair Munster"; in the season two episode "Underground Munster", Grandpa was having breakfast in bed, which was a marble slab). In The Munsters Today, Grandpa's companion was Leonard the skeleton, whom he met at college back in Transylvania. Flashbacks to the events at college and to how Leonard and Grandpa met are part of the storyline in The Munsters Today episode "Never Say Die".

Grandpa doesn't always display the traits that are commonly associated with vampires. For example, in one episode of The Munsters, he looks in the mirror and casts a reflection. However, he does not cast a reflection in later incarnations, nor does he appear on film or in pictures. Traditionally, vampires (including Sesame Street's Count von Count) do not cast reflections. Additionally, Grandpa, as well as Lily, is seen several times outdoors during day light hours without the sunlight having any effect on him. Vampires in most lore only come out at night and usually perish when out in daylight.

A running gag on the show, later adopted in The Munsters Today, is Grandpa's attempts to bite someone on the arm which usually ends in failure.

== Other media ==
Al Lewis was the only actor from the original series to reprise his role in a 1973 unsold pilot for an animated cartoon titled The Mini-Munsters. In 1987, he reprised the character as the host of SuperStation TBS's Super Scary Saturday movie block. The program aired each Saturday at noon from October 1987 to fall 1989. The name "Munsters" was never referred to in the show or its promotion and Lewis' character was simply referred to as "Grandpa". Lewis also played the role in 1-900 commercials around the same time.

In 1990, Atari Corporation released Midnight Mutants, a video game featuring "Grampa" as played by Al Lewis. Lewis also used the "Grampa" moniker for two compilation videos he did for low-budget distributor Amvest Video.

In Gremlins 2: The New Batch (1990), "Grandpa Fred" (portrayed by Robert Prosky) is an homage to "Grandpa". Fred is a failed news anchor and the host of Grandpa Fred's House Of Horrors, an obscure channel that showed horror movies late at night. He works in Clamp Center, a state-of-the-art skyscraper building in Manhattan. Fred always stays in his Dracula costume, even when not filming his show. Aided by Japanese tourist Mr. Katsuji (Gedde Watanabe), Fred films and documents the Gremlins taking over Clamp Center.

Daniel Roebuck played the role in the 2022 Rob Zombie reboot film, The Munsters, credited as "The Count".
