= Lily Munster =

- The Munsters character
- Yvonne De Carlo as Lily Munster
- First appearance: "My Fair Munster" (2nd version)
- Last appearance: The Munsters (2022 film)
- Portrayed by: Joan Marshall (Phoebe Munster; 1964, Unaired pilot); Yvonne De Carlo (1964–1966; 1981); Cynthia Adler (1973); Lee Meriwether (1988–1991); Veronica Hamel (1995); Ann Magnuson (1996); Portia de Rossi (2012); Sheri Moon Zombie (2022 film)

In-universe information
- Species: Vampire
- Gender: Female
- Spouse: Herman Munster
- Children: Eddie Munster
- Relatives: Grandpa (father); Marilyn Munster (niece); Lester Dracula (brother)

Lily Munster (née Dracula) is a fictional character in the CBS sitcom, The Munsters, originally played by Yvonne De Carlo. The matriarch of the Munster household, Lily is a vampire. The role was later played by Lee Meriwether in The Munsters Today and by Portia de Rossi in the unsold 2012 pilot Mockingbird Lane.

Lily was first introduced in the second pilot episode and is the only family member to not appear in the original pilot episode. In the original pilot Herman was married to another woman called Phoebe Munster. This plan was scrapped as the producers felt she resembled Morticia Addams too much.

== Description ==
Lily is the matriarch of the Munster family. She is a beautiful and slender woman who appears to be middle aged, although she is actually hundreds of years old. Later incarnations of the character, played by different actresses, would change her skin from green to pale white. Lily usually dresses in an ankle-length pale pink gown that appears faded and old, and she sometimes also wears a scarf. Her necklace features a bat-shaped medallion. When away from the Munster house, she often wears a long silver cape with a hood, which in reality is a coffin lining. In the episode "Munsters Masquerade", Lily demonstrates the ability to float in the air while dancing. She is very close with her niece, Marilyn. She has a brother, the Wolf Man, who appears in episode 15 ("Herman's Rival"), and a sister who is Marilyn's mother. Lily is the voice of reason in the Munster household, often relied upon to set problems right, and typically mediates when Herman and Grandpa squabble.

Lily also has a fiery temper. While she is deeply in love with Herman, she also frequently gets very angry at him (due to his frequent stupidity and occasional selfishness), and Herman often meekly discloses his fear (to others) of being on the receiving end of her wrath. She also has reprimanded her own father (Grandpa) on several occasions for his own foolish actions and stubborn self-righteousness.

Lily treats her niece Marilyn as her own daughter, but shares the family's concern that Marilyn's "hideousness" is going to condemn her to a spinster's life. As such, she is very much in favor of Marilyn dating, and is very accommodating to Marilyn's fleeting beaus despite their "rudeness." (What Lily is perceiving as lack of manners is in fact the young men's terror of seeing Marilyn's monstrous relatives).

Lily is very supportive of her son, Eddie, and keeps a close eye on his activities and social circle.

Lily is mainly a housewife, and her duties include spreading garbage around the house and "dusting" with a vacuum cleaner operating in reverse so that it blows dirt about in the nine-room-and-a-dungeon house. During the course of the series, Lily works as a welder in a shipyard, a fashion model, and a palm reader in a tea room. In one episode she forces Herman to give her money so that she and Marilyn can open a beauty parlor, but this soon goes out of business, as Lily assumes her clientele wants to look more like her. These part-time jobs never seem to stick, and Lily would be back to being a homemaker by the next episode.

== Development ==
Lily was not in the original pilot episode of The Munsters. Instead, Herman is married to a much more Gothic-looking wife named Phoebe, played by Joan Marshall, who has a somewhat abrasive bickering relationship with Herman and a strained relationship with Eddie. The producers scrapped the Phoebe character after deciding she seemed almost an exact double of the Morticia Addams character on The Addams Family. Lily appeared in the second pilot and all other episodes.

Yvonne De Carlo was cast for the role in March 1964. When she was first cast, Fred Gwynne (Herman) and Al Lewis (Grandpa) complained to the producers that De Carlo was a movie star of long standing and they were worried that she would not fit in. However, after a few shows, they had to admit they had been wrong, and all got on well. De Carlo approached the role with Donna Reed as her primary inspiration.

== See also ==
- Vampira
- Elvira
