= Al Lewis =

American actor (1923–2006)

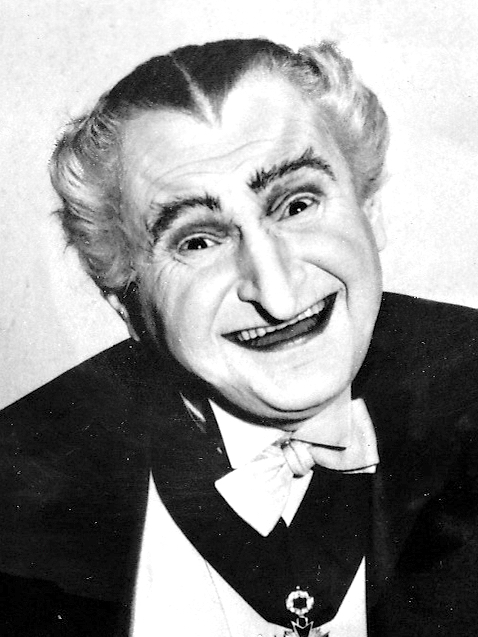
- Lewis in The Munsters in 1964
- Born: Abraham Meister; April 30, 1923; New York City, U.S.
- Died: February 3, 2006 (aged 82); Roosevelt Island, New York City, U.S.
- Other name: Grandpa Al Lewis
- Occupations: Actor; activist
- Years active: 1949–2002
- Political party: Green
- Spouses: Marge Domowitz (m. 1956; div. 1977) Karen Ingenthron (m. 1984)
- Children: 3

Al Lewis (born Abraham Meister; April 30, 1923 – February 3, 2006) was an American actor and activist, best known for his role as Grandpa on the television series The Munsters from 1964 to 1966 and its film versions. He previously also co-starred with The Munsters' Fred Gwynne in the television show Car 54, Where Are You? from 1961 to 1963. Later in life, he was a restaurant owner, political candidate, and radio broadcaster.

== Early life ==
Lewis was born Abraham Meister on April 30, 1923, in Manhattan, New York City. His parents Alexander (Yiddish: אלכסנדר מייסטער; Russian: Александр Мейстер) and Ida (née Neidel or Nedal; Yiddish: חיה יענטא ניידעל; Russian: Ида Нейдел Мейстер), a house painter from Minsk and a garment worker respectively, were Jewish immigrants from the Russian Empire; His two brothers were Phillip and Henry.

Lewis originally gave his birth year as 1910. His reputed early radio work in the mid-1930s would indicate the earlier birth date, as did an off-the-cuff remark on the TVLegends interview, 2002, where he says "not a bad memory for 92". Ted Lewis, his son, firmly said his father was born in 1923 in Brownsville, Brooklyn, New York. The official marriage records show Al's parents were married in Manhattan on October 29, 1922. Other sources placed his birth in Wolcott, New York, but no official record of his birth has been published to date (2006), and officials in Wolcott say they have no record of any Meister. The Times wrote: "Lewis was born Albert Meister, probably in 1923, but he insisted that he was born in 1910. This, and Lewis's many other questionable stories, means that much of the actor's life is a broth of conjecture that his fans will no doubt squabble over for years to come." On his application for a Social Security number, completed in February 1941, and on a World War II draft registration card completed on 30 June 1942, Lewis gave his date of birth as April 30, 1923. The 1925 New York State census lists Abe Meister, age 2, living with his parents Alexander and Ida Meister on 99th Street. The 1940 census lists an Albert Meister "age 16" living on Douglass (today's Strauss) Street in Brooklyn, New York.

In a 1998 interview with Walt Shepperd, Lewis said:

My mother was a worker, worked in the garment trades. My mother was an indomitable spirit. My grandfather had no sons. He had six daughters. They lived in Poland or Russia, every five years it would change. My mother being the oldest daughter, they saved their money, and when she was about sixteen they sent her to the United States, not knowing a word of English. She went to work in the garment center, worked her back and rear-end off and brought over to the United States her five sisters and two parents. I remember going on picket lines with my mother. My mother wouldn't back down to anyone.

=== Education ===
According to a report in The Jewish Week, Al Lewis attended Yeshiva Chaim Berlin in Brooklyn, New York, in his youth and "asked annoying questions to the teachers." Lewis then attended Thomas Jefferson High School, which he left in his junior year. He claimed to have attended Oswego State Teachers College (now SUNY Oswego), notwithstanding his lack of a high school diploma, and to have earned a Ph.D. in child psychology from Columbia University in 1941, of which Columbia has no record. Lewis did send at least one of his children to Yeshiva in the San Fernando Valley.

== Career ==
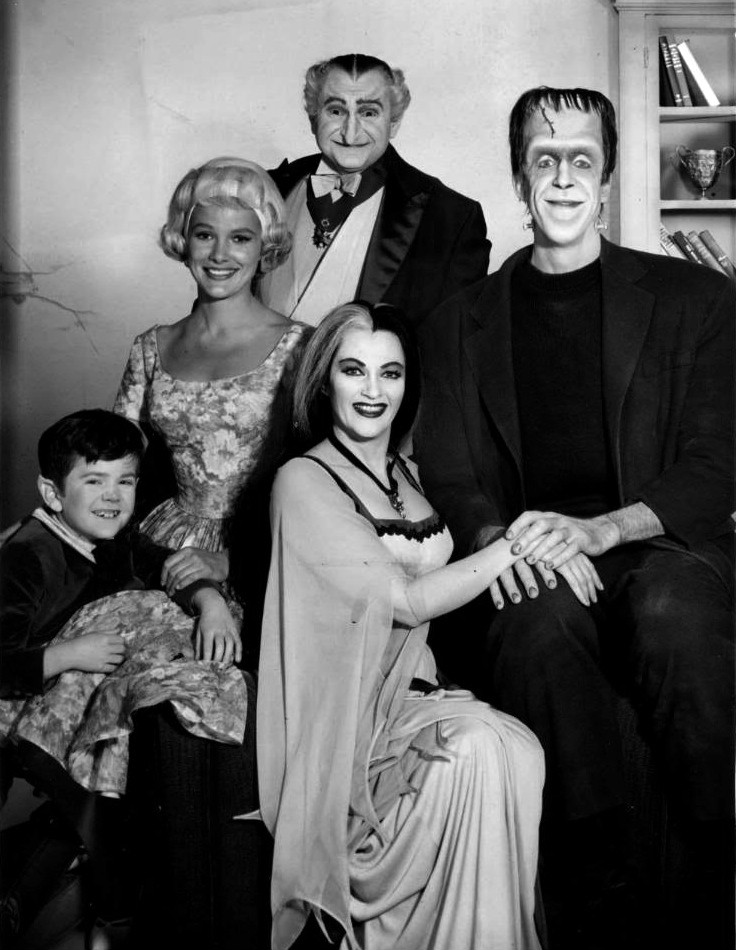
Al Lewis as Grandpa (back) with the cast of The Munsters, 1964

In 1949, after a suggestion from a friend, he decided to pursue a career as an actor after joining the Paul Mann Actors' Workshop in New York. He worked in burlesque and vaudeville theaters, then on Broadway in the dramas The Night Circus (1958) and One More River (1960) and as the character Moe Shtarker in the musical comedy Do Re Mi (1962).

His earliest television work includes appearances on the crime drama Decoy and The Phil Silvers Show. From 1959 to 1963, he appeared in four episodes of Naked City. Lewis's first well-known television role was as Officer Leo Schnauser on the sitcom Car 54, Where Are You? from 1961 to 1963, also starring Fred Gwynne (Lewis reprised the role in the 1994 movie of the same name). In the series, Lewis first played Al Spencer the Auto Body Man and a property developer in two early first-season episodes, then landed the more familiar role of Officer Schnauser. He is best remembered as Grandpa on The Munsters, which ran on CBS from 1964 to 1966.

In 1967, Lewis played the part of Zalto the magician in the Lost in Space episode "Rocket to Earth". His first role in a movie was as Machine Gun Manny in Pretty Boy Floyd (1960). He had small roles in The World of Henry Orient (1964), They Shoot Horses, Don't They? (1969), and They Might Be Giants (1971). He appeared as Hanging Judge Harrison in Used Cars (1980), played a security guard on an episode of Taxi, and had a minor role in Married to the Mob (1988). His last film role was in Night Terror (2002).

Al Lewis caricature by Jim McDermott

In 1991, he appeared as Grandpa in an episode of Hi Honey, I'm Home on ABC. In 1991, he appeared in a low-budget movie titled Grampire (My Grandpa Is a Vampire in the U.S. version), wearing much of the same costumes as he did in The Munsters. From 1987 to 1989, Lewis hosted Super Scary Saturday on TBS in his Grandpa outfit. This was parodied in Gremlins 2: The New Batch with the character of Grandpa Fred (Robert Prosky). Lewis also used the role to promote a 1-900 number known as "the Junior Vampire Club" and in a series of public domain VHS compilations for Amvest Video.

=== Other pursuits ===
Lewis was a proponent of free speech and frequently spoke out in the late 1980s and early 1990s against government entities such as the FCC (Federal Communications Commission) and non-government entities such as the PMRC (Parents Music Resource Center). A recurring guest on The Howard Stern Show, Lewis famously uttered the phrase "fuck the FCC", during a 1987 speech at a "Howard Stern Freedom Rally" held in Manhattan and organized by the radio personality. Lewis shouted the phrase repeatedly until Stern was able to take the microphone away from him. The FCC did not punish Stern or the station for Lewis's comments and Stern later used the speech as the opening track of Stern's Crucified By the FCC comedy album in early 1999.

Lewis appeared in an episode of The American Experience where he recalled his experiences at Coney Island, which he frequently visited and worked at as a game barker. He was featured in the Atari 7800 videogame Midnight Mutants, an action-adventure title with a Halloween theme. His appearance in the game mirrored his Grandpa persona in The Munsters.

In 1987, he opened an Italian restaurant named Grampa's Bella Gente at 252 Bleecker Street in Manhattan. In September 1989, he licensed a comedy club named Grampa's to an entrepreneurial mafia family named Cataldo in New Dorp Plaza in Staten Island.

== Politics ==
As a left-wing activist, he hosted a politically oriented radio program on WBAI (whose theme song was King Curtis' "Foot Pattin'") and ran as Green Party candidate for governor of New York in 1998. In that race, he sought to be listed on the ballot as Grandpa Al Lewis, arguing that he was most widely known by that name. His request was rejected by the Board of Elections, a decision upheld in court against his challenge.

Despite this setback, he achieved one of his campaign objectives. His total of 52,533 votes exceeded the threshold of votes set by New York law (50,000) and hence guaranteed the Green Party of New York an automatic ballot line for the next four years (see New York gubernatorial elections). He said that, with no political machine and no money backing him, the likelihood of winning the governorship would be "like climbing Mount Everest barefooted". In 2000, he sought the Green Party nomination for US Senate; he ultimately placed second in the primary, with about 32 percent of the vote, losing to Mark Dunau.

== Personal life and final years ==
Lewis married Marge Domowitz in 1956, with whom he had three sons, Dave, Ted, and Paul. The marriage ended in divorce in 1977. In 1984, he married actress Karen Ingenthron, to whom he remained married for the rest of his life.

In his final years, he resided on Roosevelt Island in New York City. In 2003, he was hospitalized for an angioplasty, and complications from the surgery led to an emergency bypass and the amputation of his right leg below the knee as well as all of the toes on his left foot. He died on February 3, 2006, aged 82, of natural causes in Goldwater Memorial Hospital on Roosevelt Island. His memorial service was held at Riverside Memorial Chapel in Manhattan on February 18, 2006.

== Filmography ==
=== Film ===
Year	Title	Role	Notes
1951	London Entertains	Himself	Documentary
1957	I Vampiri	Assistant	
1960	Pretty Boy Floyd	Manny 'Machine Gun Manny'	
1964	The World of Henry Orient	Tobacconist	
1966	Munster, Go Home!	Grandpa Munster	
1969	They Shoot Horses, Don't They?	Turkey	
1970	The Boatniks	Bert	
1971	They Might Be Giants	Messenger	
1973	The Night Strangler	Hobo	
1974	Death Wish	Guard At Hotel Lobby	Uncredited
1974	Black Starlet	Sam	
1974	Coonskin	The Godfather	Voice, uncredited
1975	White House Madness	Judge Cirrhosis	
1979	That's Life		unfinished film
1980	Used Cars	Judge Harrison	
1987	Comic Cabby	Al the Cabsmith	
1988	Married to the Mob	Uncle Joe Russo	
1988	Bum Rap	Mr. Wolfstadt	
1992	My Grandpa is a Vampire	Vernon Cooger	
1993	The Garden	Holocaust survivor Abel	short film
1994	Car 54, Where Are You?	Leo Schnauzer	
1994	Piedras rodantes		short film
1996	Fast Money	Poon	
1996	South Beach Academy	Uncle Gene	
1998	Sidoglio Smithee	Himself	
2002	Night Terror	Father Hanlon	
2006	Goodbye, America	Himself	Documentary

=== Television ===
Year	Title	Role	Notes
1953–1957	The Big Story	Willie	2 episodes
1957	Decoy	Chi Chi	Episode: "Queen of Diamonds"
1957	Brenner	Logan	Episode: "Thin Ice"
1959	The Phil Silvers Show	Bruno the Mobster, Mobster Bengal, Mike	3 episodes
1959	Deadline	Fletcher	Episode: "Jail Break"
1959–1960	The United States Steel Hour	Bartender, Paul Gordon	2 episodes
1959–1963	Naked City	Mr. Carrari, Mr. Tanner, Harry McGoglan, Bookie, Gus, Mr. Pike	6 episodes
1961–1963	Car 54, Where Are You?	Officer Leo Schnauser	44 episodes
1962	The Defenders	Sergeant Cross	Episode: "The Search"
1964–1966	The Munsters	Grandpa Munster	70 episodes
1967	Lost in Space	Zalto	Episode: "Rocket to Earth"
1968	Gomer Pyle - USMC	Harry Whipple	Episode: "Hit and Write"
1971	Green Acres	Charlie	Episode: "Star Witness"
1971	Night Gallery	Mishkin	1 episode
1972	Love, American Style	Bernie	1 episode
1973	The Night Strangler	Tramp	Television film
1973	The ABC Saturday Superstar Movie	Grandpa Munster	Episode: "The Mini-Munsters"
1973	Here's Lucy	Lionel Barker	Episode: "Lucy Plays Cops and Robbers"
1978	Ring of Passion	Mike Jacobs	Television film
1980	CBS Children's Mystery Theatre		Episode: "The Treasure of Alpheus T. Winterborn"
1981	The Munsters' Revenge	Grandpa Munster	Television film
1981	Taxi	Security Guard	Episode: "On the Job: Part 2"
1981	Best of the West	Judge	Episode: "The Hanging of Parker Tillman"
1988	Super Scary Saturday	Albert Einstein Grampa	Episode: "War of the Gargantuas"
1990	Mathnet	Ring Announcer	Episode: "The Case of the Masked Avenger"
1991	Hi Honey, I'm Home	Grandpa Munster	Episode: "Grey Skies"
1995	Here Come the Munsters	Restaurant Guest	Television film

== Theater ==
Year	Title	Role	Notes
1958	The Night Circus	Owner/Bartender	
1960	One More River	Performer	
1960–1962	Do Re Mi	Moe Shtarker, Fatso O'Rear	

== Electoral history ==
1998 New York gubernatorial election
Party	Candidate	Votes	%	±%
Republican	George Pataki	2,223,264	44.59%	
Conservative	George Pataki	348,727	6.99%	
Total	George Pataki (incumbent)	2,571,991	54.32%	+5.53%
Democratic	Peter Vallone, Sr.	1,518,992	30.47%	
Working Families	Peter Vallone, Sr.	51,325	1.03%	
Total	Peter Vallone, Sr.	1,570,317	33.16%	−12.29%
Independence	Tom Golisano	364,056	7.69%	+3.51%
Liberal	Betsy McCaughey	77,915	1.65%	−0.12%
Right to Life	Michael Reynolds	56,683	1.20%	−0.10%
Green	Al Lewis	52,533	1.11%	N/A
Marijuana Reform	Thomas K. Leighton	24,788	0.52%	N/A
Unity	Mary Alice France	9,692	0.21%	N/A
Libertarian	Chris Garvey	4,722	0.11%	−0.07%
Socialist Workers	Al Duncan	2,539	0.05%	+0.01%
	Blank – Void – Scattering	250,696	5.02%	N/A
Majority		1,001,674	21.15%	+17.81%
Turnout		4,985,932		
Republican hold		Swing		

2000 United States Senate Green primary in New York
Party	Candidate	Votes	%
Green	Mark Dunau	454	38.35%
Green	Al Lewis	377	31.84%
Green	Ronnie Dugger	353	29.81%
Total votes		1,184	100.00%

Party political offices
Preceded by	Green Party of New York Nominee for Governor of New York; 1998	Succeeded by Stanley Aronowitz
