= Dorothy Johnson (actress) =

American actress and print model (1936–2022)

- Born: October 14, 1936; Superior, Wisconsin, U.S.
- Died: April 7, 2022 (aged 85); Ormond Beach, Florida, U.S.
- Other name: Dorothy Mae Johnson
- Education: American Academy of Dramatic Arts
- Occupations: Film and television actor, print model
- Years active: 1953–c. 1960
- Notable credits: Bernardine; Life Begins at 17
- Style: Comedy, drama
- Children: 4, including Dorothy Papadakos
- Website: oregon55.com

Dorothy Mae Johnson (October 14, 1936 – April 7, 2022) was an American actress and print model. Starting her career as a beauty queen, she was best known for acting on television and in motion pictures during the Golden Age of Hollywood as a starlet during the 1950s. Dorothy Mae Johnson won the 1955 Miss Oregon beauty pageant and was first runner-up in the 1956 Miss America pageant. The United States Marine Corps chose her to be their official Miss Leatherneck.

Johnson was cast in the title role of Bernardine in Pat Boone's first Hollywood movie Bernardine. She was the female lead in Columbia Pictures' teen romance film Life Begins at 17 with co stars Edd Byrnes and Mark Damon. She was a working actress who performed in Hollywood productions in the studio of Warner Bros., Paramount, Twentieth Century Fox and Columbia Pictures. Johnson traveled with Conrad Hilton to participate in the week-long grand opening ceremonies of the newly built Havana Hilton Hotel in Cuba in March 1958.

== Early life and career ==
Dorothy Mae Johnson was born in Superior, Wisconsin on October 14, 1936. Five years later in 1941 Johnson's parents moved from Wisconsin to the Portland, Oregon area and settled in Garden Home, Oregon. Johnson began her modeling career in 8th grade with Maria Easterly Modeling Agency in Portland, Oregon. She was a junior print model for Jantzen swimsuits, White Stag and Pendleton Woolen Mills and appeared in a national Seventeen magazine advertisement for Skyway Luggage. During her Beaverton High School years, she studied acting at the Portland Civic Theater under the tutoring of Doris Smith. A photograph of her and Debbie Reynolds together was published in the December 1953 issue of Movie Stars Parade magazine.

== Beauty queen ==
As a teenager, Johnson was twice chosen Miss Oregon Camera Club's queen by the state's professional photographers. In 1953, at age 16, the Portland Oregon Journal Sunday magazine published a cover photo feature story by writer Bill Reasons predicting her future career in Hollywood. In 1954, at age 17, she was elected by a general public newspaper vote in Oregon's KPTV-Portland Miss Flowers of '54 contest to represent the florist industry as their theme girl for the next year.

Johnson was selected Miss Beaverton on April 14, 1955. Sponsored by the Beaverton, Oregon Junior Chamber of Commerce Jaycees, she entered and won the 1955 Miss Oregon beauty pageant held at Seaside, Oregon on July 17, 1955. This earned her a trip to the 1956 Miss America Pageant held in Atlantic City, New Jersey. For her talent portion of the Miss America pageant she performed a soliloquy of Lady Macbeth's sleepwalking scene from Macbeth by William Shakespeare. As an 18-year-old she performed before 20,000 spectators in the historic Atlantic City Boardwalk Hall and a live national television audience of 30 million viewers. After a week of competition, on the final night of the pageant, September 10, 1955, Johnson was named Miss America first runner-up. The next week her photo appeared in Time magazine. With her pageant $3,000 scholarship winnings she attended the prestigious American Academy of Dramatic Arts in New York City, the oldest English-speaking acting school in the world. After one year studying in New York, she moved to Hollywood, California to pursue her career in show business.

== USMC Miss Leatherneck ==
After her Miss America pageant performance, she caught the eye of the United States Marine Corps (USMC) who selected her to be their Miss Leatherneck in 1955. Johnson's long time association with the USMC began in 1954 working with the Marine Corps Reserves at Swan Island in Portland, Oregon. For two years, in 1956 and 1957, the USMC public relations department kept Miss Leatherneck busy traveling the country appearing on bases, at special events and in the media as their goodwill ambassador spokesperson promoting the USMC. In 2014 Leatherneck Magazine did a follow-up photo story about her titled "Miss Leatherneck: The Marine Corps' Golden Girl". She was the only official Miss Leatherneck in the history of the Marine Corps.

== Ronald Reagan and Los Angeles Home Show Queen ==
In 1958 while attending U.C.L.A., she was chosen to be the Queen of the Los Angeles Home Show. She was chosen to be queen out of 300 contestants. Among her duties was to meet and greet the public each day during the event held at the Pan-Pacific Auditorium. As Home Show Queen she appeared together with Ronald Reagan spokesperson for General Electric in a publicity photograph from the event. As a college student and working actress, her photo regularly appeared in Los Angeles, Southern California area newspapers including a story on the marvels of modern fingerprinting in the banking industry.

== Film career ==
=== The Joker Is Wild ===
Her first speaking part in a Hollywood motion picture was in the birthday cake scene with veteran actors Eddie Albert and Jackie Coogan in the Frank Sinatra movie The Joker Is Wild directed by Charles Vidor and released by Paramount Pictures in October 1957. Her line of dialogue was "What will he do? All he knows is show business."

=== Bernardine ===
Film producer Sam Engel cast her in the title role of Bernardine, the fictitious ideal dream woman of Pat Boone and his friends in the movie Bernardine. The pin-up swimsuit image of Dorothy Johnson as Bernardine was photographed by famous Hollywood studio photographer Frank Powolny and appeared in the movie and promotional materials. Bernardine was Pat Boone's first feature film and released by Twentieth Century Fox Studios in America in 1957. The movie's title song Bernardine sung by Pat Boone with music and lyrics composed by Johnny Mercer became a popular hit on the radio.

=== Life Begins at 17 ===
Producer Sam Katzman cast her as the female lead in his teen romance drama motion picture titled Life Begins at 17 filmed at Columbia Studios in Hollywood. The movie was released in July 1958. Her co-stars were Edd Byrnes and Mark Damon. Also included in the cast were Luana Anders, Ann Doran, Hugh Sanders. The Columbia Studios movie was scripted by Richard Baer (writer) and directed by Arthur Driefus for Katzman's Clover Productions. Scriptwriter Baer's maternal uncle was David Sarnoff, a broadcasting pioneer who headed the RCA company.

=== The Flying Fontaines ===
Katzman again cast her in a credited role in another of his movies for Clover Productions', The Flying Fontaines released by Columbia Pictures in 1959. She portrayed Sally, the leader of the circus' all-female orchestra in the circus themed movie starring Michael Callan.

=== The Littlest Hobo ===
Johnson appeared as Sister Ophelia in the Allied Artists Pictures Corporation movie The Littlest Hobo. The motion picture was filmed at studios located on Sunset Boulevard in Hollywood and released in the United States on July 6, 1958. The movie featured the animal adventures of London the German Shepherd dog who saves Fleecie the Lamb from the slaughter house, outwits the authorities and befriends a young girl. The 1958 movie was the basis for the popular The Littlest Hobo Canadian television series of the same name. The 1958 movie's rights are controlled by Warner Brothers Television and the family friendly movie was re-released on home video DVD in December 2016.

== Television career ==
=== Groucho Marx ===
Johnson appeared as a contestant on the Groucho Marx national broadcast television game show You Bet Your Life filmed in Hollywood on May 30, 1957. She answered questions in the music category, won $500 and a kiss from Groucho Marx.

=== Jerry Lewis ===
Johnson appeared in two sketches with Jerry Lewis on his Father's Day NBC live television Color Carnival special broadcast Saturday June 8, 1957. In the first sketch she plays a member of the studio audience interviewed and kissed by Jerry Lewis. In the second comedy sketch The Olive Thief, she is the wife of a murdered man as Jerry Lewis' character attempts to solve the mystery. The 60-minute program was performed live and broadcast nationally from Hollywood in color at the time but only black and white copies of this program are still known to exist.

=== Bob Cummings ===
Producer Paul Henning cast her in several episodes of the popular Bob Cummings television show Love That Bob. Episodes where she is credited include "Bob Retrenches" aired on NBC-TV April 8, 1958, "Bob Judges a Beauty Pageant" aired on NBC-TV December 16, 1958, and "Bob and the Dumb Blonde" aired on NBC-TV September 30, 1958.

=== Bat Masterson ===
Johnson was cast in the part of Claire Cantrell in an episode titled "Death by the Half Dozen" of Bat Masterson, a popular western television series starring Gene Barry as Masterson. Her character is the fiancée of the sheriff of Mesquite Springs, Nevada. While riding in a stage coach, she gets kidnapped by an outlaw gang and held for ransom. She is rescued by Masterson at the end of the episode. The program was produced by Ziv Television Productions for Warner Brothers and broadcast in prime time by ABC-TV on February 4, 1960.

=== Overland Trail ===
Johnson portrayed the character Lady Luck, a saloon girl, in a poker table scene with actors Doug McClure and Harry Guardino in the episode "Daughter of the Sioux" of television western series Overland Trail broadcast by NBC-TV on March 20, 1960.

=== Bourbon Street Beat ===
Johnson was cast in a feature role as Donna Sue Edison in an episode of Bourbon Street Beat a detective series murder mystery set in New Orleans. The episode was titled "The Missing Queen" broadcast by ABC-TV on March 14, 1960. The cast included regulars Richard Long and Andrew Duggan with guest co-stars Diane McBain, Roscoe Ates and Lurene Tuttle. The episode was a Warner Brothers Television Production directed by Paul Henreid, produced by Charles Hoffman with executive producer William T. Orr.

=== Television commercials ===
Johnson made television commercials during her career for products including Elgin Watches, Carnation Milk, Tang breakfast drink, Buick Automobiles, Helene Curtis Hair Products, Sterling Beer, Winston Cigarettes, Bayer Aspirin and the United States Marine Corp. Her likeness was featured in commercial print model work for the State of Oregon Development Commission, Mobil Oil, Skyway Luggage, Jantzen swimsuits, Pendleton Woolen Mills blankets and Nordstrom Department Stores.

== Personal life and death ==
As of 2012, Johnson was living in Florida, running a landscaping business. She had four children, including a daughter, Dorothy Papadakos, who is a noted concert organist, playwright, and author.

Johnson died in Ormond Beach, Florida on April 7, 2022, at the age of 85.
