= List of The Munsters episodes =

The following is an episode list for the CBS sitcom The Munsters. The series began broadcast on September 24, 1964, and ended on May 12, 1966.

Munster, Go Home! was a feature-length theatrical film released on June 15, 1966. A made-for-television film, entitled The Munsters' Revenge, aired 15 years later on February 27, 1981.

== Series overview ==
Season	Episodes	Originally released	
Season	Episodes	First released	Last released
Pilots		Unaired	
1	38	September 24, 1964	June 10, 1965
Special		April 18, 1965	
2	32	September 16, 1965	May 12, 1966

== Episodes ==
=== Pilots ===
Title	Directed by	Written by	Original release date
"My Fair Munster"	Norman Abbott	Norm Liebmann & Ed Haas	Unaired
This pilot "presentation" was used by Universal Studios to sell the show to the networks. An official version released by Universal Studios on DVD runs at approximately 14 minutes, although longer B&W versions also exist. Filmed in color, Joan Marshall appears as Phoebe, the original name for Lily, and Happy Derman appears as Eddie.
"My Fair Munster"	David Alexander	Norm Liebmann & Ed Haas	Unaired
In this second version of the pilot, filmed entirely in black and white and at standard episode length, Yvonne De Carlo and Butch Patrick make their first appearances as Lily and Eddie. This pilot was used by CBS to sell the show to advertisers. Some scenes from this episode were reshot and a newly edited version was aired as the second episode of the first season.

=== Season 1 (1964–65) ===
No. overall	No. in season	Title	Directed by	Written by	Original release date
1	1	"Munster Masquerade"	Lawrence Dobkin	Joe Connelly & Bob Mosher	September 24, 1964
Marilyn (Beverley Owen) has been seeing Tom Daly (Linden Chiles) and would like him to meet her family. She tells Herman (Fred Gwynne) and Lily (Yvonne De Carlo) that Tom's parents will be hosting a masquerade party next week and she thinks they will be invited. Tom's mother, Agnes (Mabel Albertson) does not mind inviting Marilyn, but is not sure about the family. At the party, Albert Daly (Frank Wilcox) is dressed and made up as Frankenstein's monster. Herman, dressed as King Arthur in a suit of shining armor, tells him that it is unfortunate that he is not wearing a costume at his own masquerade party. Albert gets angry and thinks the Munsters are rude. When it is time for the best costume award Herman is asked to take off his helmet. George Washington (Walter Woolf King) says that Herman should win for wearing one mask over another. Lily is mad because she thinks Herman was insulted and she wants to leave. Marilyn is also angry with Tom's family. Tom takes Marilyn home and finally sees Herman and Lily without their costumes. Tom runs away, but Marilyn is relieved.
2	2	"My Fair Munster"	David Alexander	Norm Liebmann & Ed Haas	October 1, 1964
Marilyn and Jack (Edward Mallory) come home from a date. He walks her to the door. After seeing Herman, he flees. Marilyn wonders what is wrong with her because all her boyfriends always run away after their date. Lily and Herman do not want Marilyn to be alone. Grandpa (Al Lewis) wants to help her and cooks up a love potion. The next morning, Grandpa slips the potion into Marilyn's oatmeal. Marilyn skips breakfast and Herman, Lily, and Eddie (Butch Patrick) accidentally eat the love potion. While delivering a package to the house, the mailman Warren Bloom (John Fiedler) starts to flirt with Lily. Herman is watering the weeds in the backyard and neighbor Yolanda Cribbins (Claire Carleton) starts finding him attractive. Eddie is chased by a group of girls while coming home. Later, Warren and Yolanda come by the house and start chasing Herman and Lily around. Grandpa and Marilyn find out what is happening, and she tells him that she would rather have someone like her for herself. The potion eventually wears off and Warren and Yolanda run away. Note: This was the first of the broadcast episodes to be filmed, although it was the second one aired.
3	3	"A Walk on the Mild Side"	Norman Abbott	Norm Liebmann & Ed Haas	October 8, 1964
Suffering from insomnia caused by mounting bills, Herman begins going on midnight walks. Meanwhile, Police Chief W.R. Harris (Cliff Norton) is told they are still getting complaints about a purse snatcher (Paul Baxley) roaming the park. While seeing Herman, other people get scared and tell the police that a monster is in the park. The next morning, Grandpa tells Lilly and Herman that he is working on an invention that will make them a lot of money. Grandpa shows his "enlarging machine" to Marilyn and Eddie. But he is having some trouble getting it to work properly. That night, Herman goes for another walk. Two policemen try to jump him, but the street lights go out because of Grandpa's machine. Herman races home and tells Lilly he was attacked in the park. Eddie tells Herman that Marilyn and her date went to the park. Herman decides to go to find Marilyn. Harris dresses up as a woman and goes out to find the monster. With Herman's help, the purse snatcher is caught. After Harris describes the other person that helped him get the purse snatcher, police Commissioner Ludlow (Barry Kelley) reassigns Harris. Grandpa finds another way to help Herman sleep.
4	4	"Rock-A-Bye Munster"	Norman Abbott	Joe Connelly & Bob Mosher	October 15, 1964
Herman thinks Lily is pregnant after overhearing her speak with Marilyn about a playmate for Eddie. The truth is that Marilyn will care for Dr. Dudley's (Paul Lynde) son, Elmer (Peter Robbins), who will be staying for a week. Meanwhile, Lily goes to see car dealer Diamond Jim (Sid Melton), picks out two cars (a hearse and a roadster) and asks Jim to have the body shop combine them. Herman later tells Lilly that he knows about the new arrival. Lilly thinks he is talking about Elmer. It is the morning of Herman's birthday. Lily tells Herman that Eddie's new playmate has arrived and that he is in the living room. Elmer brought a Frankenstein doll, and when Herman sees it, he thinks that it is his newborn son. Eddie and Elmer explain to Herman that it is only a toy. He faints and later Lilly explains everything to him. But Herman cheers up after seeing the customized car Lily bought him as a present. Note: First appearance of the family car, the "Munster Koach"; Chronologically this episode takes place after "Low-Cal Munster", where Herman visits Dr. Dudley's office, here the characters mentioning said moment
5	5	"Pike's Pique"	Seymour Berns	Norman Liebmann & Ed Haas	October 22, 1964
Grandpa is trying to help a sick Herman. Meanwhile, workers from City Gas dig for a gas pipeline 25 feet (7.6 m) underground and accidentally reach Grandpa's laboratory in the dungeon of the Munster's house. When they see Herman and Grandpa, the workers run off in horror and report what they saw to their boss Borden T. Pike (Richard Deacon). Pike goes to the Munster's home to try and secure rights to run the pipe. Pike makes them a financial offer, but Grandpa is against them digging under the house. Pike runs off after Grandpa changes into a bat. Herman later calls Pike and tells him he will come over to his house to sign the papers. But, still not feeling well, Herman sends Marilyn instead. This causes a problem as Pike's wife, Fanny (Jane Withers), thinks he is seeing other women and slams the door on Marilyn. Herman calls Pike and says he is coming over to punch him in the nose because of how he treated Marilyn. Fanny answers the door and faints when she sees Herman. Pike goes to the Munster house to apologize. Despite some of Grandpa's meddling, the deal eventually goes through.
6	6	"Low-Cal Munster"	Norman Abbott	Norm Liebmann & Ed Haas	October 29, 1964
Herman is invited to a reunion of his old Army outfit. Herman is upset when he cannot fit in his old uniform. Lily tells him to see a doctor who can put him on a sensible diet. Herman goes to see Dr. Dudley, who gives him an examination. It is a bit of a confusing examination, because Dudley cannot see without his glasses. When Dudley tells him to lose a hundred pounds in a week, Herman resolves only to consume water and vitamins. Lily insists he go to the reunion and not wear his uniform. Everyone wants him to eat something, but Herman insists he can lose the weight. However, Herman started his diet just as Thanksgiving is approaching. Herman has a fainting spell and the family has Dudley come to see him. There is more confusion and Dudley goes running out of the house. The family straps Herman to a table and then goes out for their Thanksgiving meal. But a hunger-stricken Herman escapes and makes his way to a home where a family named Farber are about to have dinner. He breaks into the house and starts eating their turkey. Herman later fits into his uniform, but only with the help of a corset. Note: Chronologically this episode takes place before "Rock-A-Bye Munster", where the characters mention Herman's visit to Dr. Dudley's office from this episode
7	7	"Tin Can Man"	Earl Bellamy	Story by : Robert Lewin; Teleplay by : Norm Liebmann & Ed Haas	November 5, 1964
Herman is upset because he found three letters from Principal Balding (Richard Simmons) saying that Eddie is flunking in science. Herman tells Lily they should go talk to Balding. Meanwhile, Mr. Taggart (Arch Johnson), the school's juvenile investigator, would like to see Eddie expelled. Balding tells him there's probably a good reason why the Munsters haven't answered the letters. Eager to impress Balding at the school science-fair, Eddie builds a life-size, fully-functioning robot. Taggart checks out the Munster home to see Eddie's living environment. Grandpa takes Taggart around the house and shows him Eddie's robot. Taggart still says Eddie should be expelled. Grandpa has the robot go after Taggart and Taggart runs out of the house. Marilyn convinces Balding to give Eddie another chance. The family goes to the science fair. Eddie's robot is sabotaged by Taggart and Grandpa tries to repair it in time. Eddie's name is called and Herman goes out on stage with the intention of stalling for time. The audience believes that Herman is the robot. Grandpa thinks he's fixed the robot, but it blows up. Eddie tries to tell Balding what happened. Eddie still gets an award. Kathleen O'Malley as The Wife. Rand Brooks as The Man. Murray Alper as The Second Man.
8	8	"Herman the Great"	Earl Bellamy	Joe Connelly & Bob Mosher	November 12, 1964
Eddie has his friend Wilbur (Teddy Eccles) over, and Herman wows the kids with exhibitions of his strength. Wilbur's dad, Duke Ramsey (John Hubbard) is a wrestling promoter. He hears about Herman, calls him and invites him to be a wrestler. Herman would like to keep it a secret, so Duke suggests that Herman becomes the Masked Marvel. Herman decides he must start to put some money aside for Eddie's college education, so he takes the job. Grandpa discovers Herman's secret and promises to not tell anyone. Herman's first match is against Tarzan McGirk (Gene LeBell). Herman was winning, but then he loses in the end. Herman tells Grandpa that he let Tarzan win because he gave him a sob story. Herman winds up losing more fights because the other wrestlers all give him a sob story. Ramsey comes up with a gimmick. He will pay by the minute any amateur to fight Herman. But Strangler Murphy (Billy Varga), a professional wrestler, and his manager, Mr. Hansen (Joseph Mell), plan to pretend to be an amateur. Hansen will put sleeping pills in Herman's water. Eddie wants to watch the match on TV, even though Lily and Marilyn think the Masked Marvel is a bully and a coward. Lily sees Grandpa in the audience and the family figures out that it's Herman. Grandpa uses his magic to help Herman win. When a small fire is discovered, Herman clears the arena by taking off his hood. Johnny Silver as Jerry. Jimmy Lennon as The Ring Announcer.
9	9	"Knock Wood, Here Comes Charlie"	Lawrence Dobkin	Norm Liebmann & Ed Haas	November 19, 1964
Herman's twin brother, Charlie (Fred Gwynne, in a dual role), comes by for a visit. Charlie brings everyone gifts and they're happy to see him. Herman, however, is not pleased that Charlie came by. Charlie also brought with him his latest invention. He claims it will extract uranium from sea water and will make him a lot of money. But the family doesn't know it's really a worthless device. Herman tells Lily that he wants Charlie out of the house as he is nothing but a fast-talking con artist. Marilyn doesn't trust Charlie either. Herman says that Charlie probably heard about Lily's $5000 inheritance. Charlie gets a call from Leo "Knuckles" Kraus (Mike Mazurki), who tells Charlie he has 24 hours to pay back a $1000 loan. Charlie tries to sell the machine to Lily, but Herman won't let her. Grandpa thinks he broke Charlie's machine when he can't get it to produce any uranium. When Charlie hears that neighbor Mrs. Cartwright (Jean Willes) has lots of money, he sells the machine to her. Knowing the machine is worthless and to protect the Munster name, Herman buys the machine back from Mrs. Cartwright. Grandpa tells Charlie that he fixed the machine, so Charlie buys it back from Herman. But there apparently are still a few bugs in the machine.
10	10	"Autumn Croakus"	Lawrence Dobkin	James Allardice & Tom Adair	November 26, 1964
Herman and Lily are going on a picnic. Marilyn is out with a boyfriend and Eddie is going out to play. Grandpa is left all alone. Grandpa wants to marry again, because he's feeling lonely. He sees in the paper about a matrimonial agency. Herman is against it, but Grandpa gets fascinated with a woman named Lydia Gardner (Linda Watkins). Lydia comes by the house and is greeted by Marilyn. Lydia is a little surprised when she meets Lily. Grandpa makes a grand entrance. Lily invites Lydia to stay with them for a while. Marilyn tells Lily there's something strange about Lydia. What they don't know is that she is from a fraudulent agency. Lydia and her partner, Malcolm (Neil Hamilton), make their living by her marrying men and then killing them for their money. Herman refuses to meet Lydia and goes to his room. Grandpa tells Lydia that he signed all the legal papers she gave him. Lydia's first attempt to kill Grandpa fails. That evening she sees Herman for the first time, screams and runs out of the house. The police catch her outside and explain to Marilyn what she was up to. And that her nickname is Black Widow Gardner. Richard Reeves as The First Policeman.
11	11	"The Midnight Ride of Herman Munster"	Ezra Stone	Joe Connelly & Bob Mosher	December 3, 1964
Lily and Herman return from a midnight visit to the drive-in. Lily forgot her fur coat in the family's Cadillac (not the Munster's Koach). Herman goes to get it and falls asleep in the back seat. The car is promptly stolen by two thieves named Freddie (Lennie Weinrib) and Al, to be used as a getaway car on a bank job. After a while, Lily notices the car is gone and tells Grandpa. Lily calls the police and gives the Police Sergeant (Paul Bryar) Herman's description. Freddie and Al get to their hideout. Marty (Val Avery) tells them they're waiting for their getaway driver, Big Louie (Maxie Rosenbloom). Herman wakes up and goes to the hideout. The crooks mistake him for Big Louie. Because they have a gun, Herman goes with them. The family goes looking for Herman. Lily calls the police again and they say they picked up Herman. The police mistake a drunken Big Louie for Herman and they drop him off at the Munster's house. The bank is robbed. Back at home, Lily thinks Herman is sleeping in bed, but it's Louie. The police are chasing the crooks, so Herman intentionally crashes the car so they get caught. Herman calls Lily and she learns that he's not the one in the bed. Big Louie is returned to the police.
12	12	"The Sleeping Cutie"	Norman Abbott	James Allardice & Tom Adair	December 10, 1964
Grandpa has invented a pill that turns water into gasoline. Grandpa sends a sample to Reliable Oil Company hoping to sell it. Meanwhile, Marilyn has been suffering from insomnia. Mr. Hadley (Walter Woolf King), the president, is at first skeptical of Grandpa's pill. His assistant, Dick Prince (Grant Williams), helps convince Hadley that it really works. Grandpa gives Marilyn a magic potion in order to help her get some sleep. The next morning, Marilyn is still asleep. Grandpa discovers that he used a Sleeping Beauty potion and only the kiss of a Prince will brake the spell. Hadley has sent Prince to close the deal with Grandpa. Prince arrives, but Lily tells him to come back later. Grandpa accidentally destroys the formula for the gasoline pill. Hadley thinks Grandpa is stalling to get other offers. Herman puts an ad in the paper looking a prince. Paul Newmar (Gavin MacLeod) and George Spelvin (John Hoyt), two actors, come to the house. When they see Herman, they run away. Dick Prince comes back to see Grandpa. Herman sees that he would be the perfect prince. Grandpa says that he will sign the contract if Prince kisses Marilyn. Prince discovers that Marilyn is a pretty girl, and when he kisses her the spell is broken. Grandpa signs the contract that says he will keep his product off the market. But Herman and Lily say that they won't accept any money, as a thank you for Prince and his help.
13	13	"Family Portrait"	Lawrence Dobkin	James Allardice & Tom Adair	December 17, 1964
The Munsters are to be photographed by Event magazine, which has picked them as the "average American family". The prize includes $5,000. Every member of the family must appear in the family portrait. Herman gets a telegram from the magazine stating that a photographer and a reporter will come by to spend the weekend. Grandpa is offended by the word "average" and tells Lily and Herman he won't be around. Herman gets Grandpa to promise to not leave the house, which he does. The day the men are to arrive, Grandpa is nowhere to be found. The family is worried about losing the prize money. Herman and Lily decide to go out and look for Grandpa. Lennie Bates (Harvey Korman) and Chip Johnson (Fred Beir) arrive and Marilyn shows them in. Chip starts flirting with Marilyn, while Lennie is fightened by the house. Lennie calls Mr. Morgan (Roy Roberts), the magazine director, and says their research must have made a mistake. Morgan insists they get the story and pictures. Herman and Lily can't find Grandpa. What they don't know is that he's hiding in the attic. While unpacking his cameras, Lennie continues to see strange things. During the night, Lennie gets up to get some water and sees Herman. Chip thinks Lennie is seeing things and they go looking around to prove Lennie was wrong. They bump into Herman, Lily and Grandpa and run out of the house. Morgan tells them to go back and get a picture. The Munsters family portrait appears on the cover of the magazine and says that here is the average family celebrating Halloween. Note: Final appearance of Beverley Owen as Marilyn. The colorized version of this episode was released as a single DVD on October 7, 2008.
14	14	"Grandpa Leaves Home"	Norman Abbott	Richard Conway & Roland MacLane	December 24, 1964
Herman is trying to read a book. Grandpa is doing things that are starting to annoy Herman. Herman and Grandpa have a fight. Grandpa claims that nobody wants "this poor broken down old man" and that he'll leave forever. Herman tells Lily that Grandpa's just bluffing. Herman's plan is to act as though nothing is happening when Grandpa says good bye. Grandpa is only pretending but when he sees that the family doesn't seem concerned, he leaves the house. Lily is worried, so Herman says he'll go out looking for him. While looking for him, Herman frightens people and animals along the way. Eddie sees in the paper that Grandpa's working in a night club as a magician. Lily calls Grandpa at the club and he says his act is doing great. The Club Manager (Robert Strauss) tells Grandpa to improve his act or he's out. Herman and Lily go to the club to check on Grandpa. Grandpa attempts a trick where he locks himself in a trunk with chains and nails, and tries to get out unassisted. Things don't go well at first and he can't get out. Herman goes on stage and helps open the trunk. Grandpa tells him to leave. To save his act, Grandpa opens the trunk after turning into a wolf, then closes it and gets out as himself. Grandpa declines an offer to tour with the wolf-act, because he prefers to come back to his family. Iris Adrian as Woman in the club. Note: First appearance of Pat Priest as Marilyn, appearing in the tag scene.
15	15	"Herman's Rival"	Joseph Pevney	Richard Conway & Roland MacLane	December 31, 1964
Lily tells Marilyn that Herman is overdrawn at the bank and that they are broke. Grandpa finds out that Herman has lent $5,000 to his brother-in-law Lester, all the money in the family bank account. Grandpa tells Herman that Lester is a born loser. To help the family, Lily wants to get a job. Lily goes to see Mr. Haggerty at the employment agency. At first Haggerty doesn't think he has a job for Lily due to the way she answered his questions. But then he gets Lily a job reading palms in a tearoom, run by Ramon (Lee Bergere). Lily doesn't want Herman nor Grandpa to know about the job. She leaves after Herman goes to work and comes home before he does. Grandpa begins to fill Herman's head with the idea that Lily might be having an affair. They follow Lily to her job and see her during a reading session with Ramon, holding his hands. Back at home, Herman asks Lily where she was all day and she says shopping. Herman's very angry and encouraged by Grandpa, leaves home heading for the tearoom to have it out with Ramon. Lester calls and tells Lily he has the money to pay back Herman. Lily confesses about her job to Grandpa and she calls Ramon to warn him. Herman confronts Ramon and Ramon faints. Lily and Grandpa arrive and think Herman killed Ramon. They explain things to Herman. Ramon comes to, sees the three of them and faints again. Lester arrives to repay them and is revealed to be the Wolf Man. Tommy Farrell as The Assistant.
16	16	"Grandpa's Call of the Wild"	Earl Bellamy	Joe Connelly & Bob Mosher	January 7, 1965
Eddie wants to go camping and Herman and Lily thinks it's a good idea. Marilyn has to stay home to study, so the rest of the family goes camping in a National Park. After they arrive, the Park Rangers report them to Superintendent Haskell (Don Haggerty) because they are a little strange looking. Lily doesn't like that Herman set up the tent where it's in the sunlight. Herman pulls a tree out of the ground and moves it so the tent is in the shade. Herman shows Eddie how to cast a fishing pole. His line goes so far it winds up at someone elses camp and he hooks a fish cooking in a frying pan. That evening the howling of wolves makes Grandpa nostalgic for Transylvania. The next morning Lily tells Herman that Grandpa's gone. They hear a radio report that a Transylvanian wolf is in the custody of Park Rangers. Lily decides to go to the Ranger station by herself to claim Grandpa. At the station, Lily is talking to the wolf as if it were human. The Rangers don't believe Lily's story that the wolf is her father. Lily finds out that Grandpa forgot how to change back. The Rangers won't allow Lily to take the wolf with her. They say the wolf will be shipped to the New York zoo the next day. That night, Herman rescues Grandpa. The family must now figure out how to get Grandpa out of the park as the Rangers are searching every car. Back at the house they use one of Grandpa's potions to change him back to normal. Ed Peck as Ranger Willard. Bing Russell as The Second Ranger.
17	17	"All Star Munster"	Earl Bellamy	Joe Connelly & Bob Mosher	January 14, 1965
Lily tells Herman that Marilyn came home from college in tears. It tuns out that Marilyn was sent home because her tuition has not been fully paid. Herman goes to talk to the Dean. He is mistaken by Coach Roger Denman (Frank Maxwell) for college basketball recruit Moose Mallory (Robert Easton). Meanwhile, Moose and his hick father Pop Mallory (Pat Buttram) arrive at the bus station. They figure there's no one to meet them because the bus was late. Herman is confused as to why he has to show Denman his basketball skills just to see the Dean. Believing he is clearing up the tuition problem, Herman is tricked into signing up. Moose and his father show up to Denman's office. Denman discovers that it was actually Herman he signed up and not Moose, but he'd rather keep Herman. He tells Moose the job is filled and kicks them out. When they see Herman's name in the paper, the family realizes that he messed up and Marilyn still can't go back to school. Marilyn is upset. The Mallorys also see the paper and they decide to take out their grievance on Herman. They come by the house and Lily and Herman explain everything. Herman manages to convince the Coach to tear up his contract and sign Moose. Moose winds up being the star of the team and Marilyn goes out on a date with him. Darrall Imhoff as Herman Munster in Basketball Game.
18	18	"If a Martian Answers, Hang Up"	Norman Abbott	Joe Connelly & Bob Mosher	January 21, 1965
Herman has a new Ham radio. Two of Eddie's friends, Walt and Roger (Ronnie Dapo), are playing Spacemen on their walkie talkies. Herman picks up their signal. Thinking they're Martians, he tries to talk to them. The boys tell him that they will continue broadcasting the same time the next day. Herman is so excited he can't sleep. Herman thinks he is on the verge of the biggest scientific breakthrough in history. The next day, the boys are now dressed up in spacesuits and have a large toy spaceship. They get in contact with Herman again and this time Grandpa is listening. Herman wants to contact the Air Force, but Grandpa says they need evidence. Herman and Grandpa go out searching for the spaceship using a radio direction finder. They find the two boys in the spacesuits and their spaceship. The boys are frightened and run away. Herman takes a picture of the spaceship. Grandpa brings it to the Air Force and speaks with Captain Halbert (Herbert Rudley). Halbert pretends to take Grandpa seriously. The next day Roger tells his father, Mr. Andrews (Dort Clark), what they saw. Herman contacts the boys and Mr. Andrews puts a scare into Herman by saying he'll blow up the Earth. Grandpa finds out from Halbert there are no Martians and the spaceship was a toy and tells Herman. Ray Montgomery as The 1st Man. Larry Thor as The 2nd Man. Note: The costume for the real alien at the end is the same one that was used in "O.B.I.T.", a 1963 episode of The Outer Limits.
19	19	"Eddie's Nickname"	Joseph Pevney	Richard Baer	January 28, 1965
Eddie comes home saying he'll never go back to school. Lily wants Herman to talk to Eddie. Eddie tells Herman he is upset that his school nickname is Shorty. Eddie wants to be tall like his hero, his father. Lily thinks that they should complain to the school. Grandpa tries to teach Eddie boxing, but Herman is completely against it. Grandpa then figures the solution is to make one of his famous secret potions. He makes one that will make Eddie grow six inches (152.4 mm) in height overnight. It grows him a beard instead. Herman wants to shave it off, but Grandpa says it will just grow back right away. Herman takes Eddie to see Dr. Dudley, but the doctor isn't any help. Grandpa says he'll make Eddie his partner and they'll sell the potion as a cure for baldness. The family finds a most unusual way to cure Eddie. It seems the soup the family is eating for dinner dissolves the beard. Grandpa is disappointed that his cure for baldness won't work. Herman tells Eddie that it doesn't matter what you look like, it's what kind of person you are that matters. Alice Backes as Nurse Fairchild.
20	20	"Bats of a Feather"	Jerry Paris	James Allardice & Tom Adair	February 4, 1965
Lily and Herman are discussing which pet Eddie should take to the school pet fair. Lily thinks their cat and Herman says Spot. Grandpa says it should be Igor the bat. Herman can't get Spot to come out from under the stairs. They decide on Igor. But, Igor gets insulted by one of Herman's wisecracks and flies away. Grandpa changes himself into a bat to impersonate Igor. At school, Eddie shows Principal Hazlett, Teacher Miss Guthrie (Barbara Babcock) and the kids the tricks Igor can do. Eddie comes home and says he traded Igor for the weekend for classmate Timmy Brubaker's squirrel. When Eddie tries to get Grandpa back, he finds out that Timmy's dad took him to a laboratory in Washington. At the lab, Dr. Grant (Alvy Moore) tells Mr. Brubaker that the plan is to send the bat up into space with a female bat. The family goes to Washington and Herman manages to get into the lab. Herman scares Grant and Brubaker. The only problem is Herman takes the wrong bat. Grandpa eventually escapes the lab. Grandpa gets home and tells the family that Herman took the wrong bat. Igor comes back and gets friendly with the female bat. Allan Hunt as The 2nd G.I. Ronnie Dapo as The 1st Boy. Jim Mathers as The 2nd Boy.
21	21	"Don't Bank on Herman"	Ezra Stone	Douglas Tibbles	February 11, 1965
Marilyn isn't feeling well. She was going to go to the bank for Lily. Lily then asks Herman to go to the bank and withdraw all the money from their tax account. Meanwhile, Bank manager Mr. Grover (Maurice Manson) is worried about robbers who have been disguising themselves in Halloween masks. So, when Herman and Grandpa arrive at the bank, they're mistaken for the robbers. The frightened cashier gives them all the money in cash. At home, they count the money and come up with $18,300. An angry Lily explains to Herman that the correct amount of money should have been $680. Lily tells Herman to return the money to the bank the next day. Herman knows he won't be able to sleep until the money is returned. He decides to go to the bank during the night with Grandpa. They manage to get into the bank. Despite the bank vault having a time lock on it, Herman figures out a way to open it. But when they're inside of the vault, the door closes accidentally and locks them inside. They find an emergency phone in the vault. There is some confusion and they aren't able to use the phone. A couple of crooks, Fingers Malone (Paul 'Mousie' Garner) and Scotty Dusick, arrive. They blow off the vault door without knowing the surprise that they'll find inside. The robbers faint and the police are able to capture them later.
22	22	"Dance With Me, Herman"	Joseph Pevney	Story by : James Allardice & Tom Adair; Teleplay by : James Allardice & Tom Adair and Joe Connelly & Bob Mosher	February 18, 1965
Lily finds an invitation inside Marilyn's bureau drawer for a "Parent's Night" taking place at her school. Lily tells Herman they have to be subtle in finding out why Marilyn hasn't mentioned it to them. At dinner, Herman just blurts out about Parent's Night. Marilyn says that she didn't mention it as it is a dance party and she knows that Herman isn't a great dancer. Lily thinks they should go, but Herman says he hates to dance. Herman finds an ad in the paper about a dance school. Herman goes to the school and has Miss Valentine (Joyce Jameson) as his teacher. Herman tells Lily the dance class went so well, that the school director, "Doc" Happy Havemeyer (Don Rickles), might make him a dance teacher. Miss Valentine has Herman sign a suspicious contract. Herman tells the family that he signed a 10 year contract with the school. Grandpa discovers that the contract is nothing but a fraud, with Herman practically signing his life away. Havemeyer finds out that the police will be investigating his business. Miss Valentine thinks Herman could be in on it and after seeing Herman for the first time, Havemeyer agrees. He tells Herman that he has no talent and tears up the contract. Herman is very disappointed as he thought he might become a big dancing star. Herman decides to not go to the party and tells Lily and Marilyn to go without him. Lily agrees, but at the porch she pretends to sprain her ankle so she could stay home with Herman.
23	23	"Follow That Munster"	Joseph Pevney	Joe Connelly & Bob Mosher	February 25, 1965
Herman takes a correspondence course on how to become a detective and applies to a local detective agency, calling himself Agent 702. He practices, wearing disguises and patrolling the streets at night. Herman tells Grandpa that he's going to quit his job at the Parlor. Lily catches Herman trying to sneak out of the house again. She gets upset because she wanted him to help her with some charity work. Lily, who doesn't know about Herman's secret job and now suspects that he is having an affair, goes to the same agency where Herman applied for a job and asks to have him followed. After Lily's description, the boss, Mr. Kempner (Ken Lynch), decides to use Agent 702. Herman draws a sketch based on the description of the husband he is supposed to follow (the sketch shown was drawn by Gwynne, who played Herman). The picture looks like Herman, and they find out it was Lily who put in the request. Grandpa comes up with a plan to have Agent 702 file a favorable report on Herman Munster. Lily reads the report in front of the family. Everyone is happy and the agency gives Herman another job as a bodyguard for a woman, Mrs. Andrews (Doris Singleton). But problems arise when Lily, out doing charity work with Marilyn, finds Herman at the woman's house. Lily knocks Herman out and he winds up getting fired from the agency. Michael Winkelman as Him.
24	24	"Love Locked Out"	Charles Barton	James Allardice & Tom Adair	March 4, 1965
Herman tells Lily that the Parlor's office party should be over by 6:30. Herman's friends, Winthrop (Norm Grabowski) and Calvin (Bryan O'Byrne), didn't tell him the party actually starts at 9:00. Herman comes home after midnight and an angry Lily won't let him in their bedroom. She tells him to sleep on the couch. During the night, Herman is frightened by a mouse and wakes up Grandpa and Eddie. Grandpa tells Herman to not give in, Lily will come around. After four days and nights of this, Marilyn and Grandpa separately encourage Lily and Herman to see a marriage councilor. They wind up both seeing the some doctor. Lily sees Dr. Harvey Baxter (Elliott Reid) first. He tells her to play the role of peacemaker and forgive and forget. Herman sees the doctor next. Not knowing Lily is Herman's wife, Dr. Baxter tells Herman he must assume the role of peacemaker first, not the wife. Herman and Lily have a fight over who will be peacemaker first. Grandpa comes up with a plan to bring the two together by pretending that Eddie is sick with the measles.
25	25	"Come Back, Little Googie"	Joseph Pevney	Story by : Leo Rifkin; Teleplay by : Joe Connelly & Bob Mosher	March 11, 1965
Googie Miller (Billy Mumy), a friend of Eddie's, visits for the weekend. Everyone is excited about it, until they find out what a rude and mischievous child Googie is. It's dinner time and Lily tells the family to make a special effort to be nice to Googie. Googie then pulls a prank on Herman. The next morning, Lily and Marilyn think Herman should take Googie home, but Eddie wants him to stay. Googie wants to see Grandpa's lab. Googie bets Grandpa that he can't turn him into a rabbit. Grandpa says he's busy now, but he'll do it later. Googie pulls a prank on Grandpa. Later, Grandpa puts Googie behind a curtain and says a few magic phrases. When they move the curtain, they find that Googie has been turned into a chimp. Grandpa tries to change Googie back, but it doesn't work. They don't know that Googie has played a practical joke on Grandpa and that the chimp is from a pet store. Meanwhile, Googie confesses to Eddie what he did. Eddie is really mad, but Googie forces him to keep quiet and go to the movies. Marilyn receives a call from Googie's mother, asking to bring the child home. Herman and Grandpa bring the chimp to the Miller house. Eddie and Googie come back from the movies. Mr. Miller (Russ Conway) calls Lily and says he's coming to get Googie. Mr. Miller picks up Googie and drops off the chimp. Eddie explains to the family what Googie did.
26	26	"Far Out Munsters"	Joseph Pevney	Richard Conway & Joe Connelly & Bob Mosher	March 18, 1965
The family is relaxing after dinner. Eddie says he has a new record and asks if he can play it. It turns out to be a rock 'n' roll record from The Standells and the family is not happy. Meanwhile, Pops Murdock, the manager of The Standells, is looking for a place for the band to stay at while in town. It's got to be a place where they don't have to worry about doing any damage. Murdock talks to Marilyn and offers $1,500 to rent the house for one weekend. Marilyn doesn't think the family would be interested, but she'll mention it to them. When Lily says they could use the money for the bills they have, Herman agrees to rent the house. Murdock will put the family up in a fancy hotel. The band arrives at the house and decides to have a party. The Munsters arrive at their hotel room and are unable to adjust to the cleanliness. The family returns home and hears a party going on inside. The guests don't know the family lives there, but they welcome them in. Eddie recognizes The Standells and the family is starting to enjoy the music. The party is a success and everyone has a good time. Kelton Garwood as The Hermit. Zalman King as Bearded Man. Note: At the party the Standells perform a cover of The Beatles "I Want to Hold Your Hand," Herman improvises a beatnik poem, and Lily sings the English folksong "He's Gone Away" while playing the harp. (Yvonne DeCarlo did her own singing in this episode.)
27	27	"Munsters on the Move"	Joseph Pevney	George Tibbles and Joe Connelly & Bob Mosher	March 25, 1965
Herman tells Lily and Grandpa that he has been promoted to manager of a branch office by his boss, Mr. Gateman. But they'll have to move to Buffalo, New York and the house will have to be sold. The family agrees to sell the house. Because Eddie is staying at a friends house, he doesn't know about the decision. Meanwhile, Eddie is talking to his friend Jerry. Jerry is excited that Eddie was made captain of the school baseball team. Eddie mentions how much he likes his school. An Elderly Man and Woman (Charles Seel and Nydia Westman) come to see the house, but are frightened away. Then a Gypsy family comes by. When they see the Munsters, they leave. A Mr. Dennison (Bert Freed) shows up and wants to buy the house. Grandpa signs a contract not knowing that he has sold the house to a demolition company. Eddie finds out about moving and refuses to go. Herman tries talking Eddie into moving, but it doesn't work. The family decides to stay. Grandpa calls Dennison and tells him they've changed their minds about selling. But Dennison arrives with his bulldozers to destroy the house. Herman finds a way to change Dennison's mind.
28	28	"Movie Star Munster"	Jerry Paris	Story by : James Allardice & Tom Adair; Teleplay by : Joe Connelly & Bob Mosher	April 1, 1965
Herman wants to work on their car as a weekend project. Meanwhile, J.R. Finlater (Jesse White) and Alfred Swanson (Walter Burke), a pair of con artists, want to stage a phony accident as an insurance scam. Grandpa and Lilly read about the con artists in the paper. The men find Herman working on his car, and with one look, they realize they have found the perfect patsy. They tell Herman that he could become a film star if he agrees to work with them. Herman signs a contract without knowing that it's an insurance policy. Lily and Grandpa have a hard time believing Herman will be a movie star, but Lily is excited. Herman acts in a bunch of dangerous scenes, but he manages to survive each attempt to hurt him. It's the con artists that wind up getting hurt. The men have another plan to get Herman hurt. Herman is getting a big ego and wants the scene to be rewritten. Lily and Grandpa now read in the paper that the con artists pose as movie producers. They realize that Herman is in trouble and want to call the police. Herman keeps wanting things changed in the scene. He finally figures out that the men wanted him to get hurt. Back at home, Lily explains things to Herman about the men collecting on insurance scams. Finlater and Swanson want to get even with Herman and go to his house. But Spot frightens them away.
29	29	"Herman the Rookie"	Jerry Paris	Story by : Richard Conway; Teleplay by : Joe Connelly & Bob Mosher	April 8, 1965
Leo Durocher, third base coach of the Los Angeles Dodgers, needs a power hitter for his team. Meanwhile, Herman is teaching Eddie how to hit a baseball. Durocher gets conked on the head by one of Herman's line drives from eight blocks away. After finding out who hit the ball, Durocher goes in person to visit Herman. Because Herman is busy, Durocher first speaks to Lily and then to Grandpa. Leo finally meets Herman and faints. Durocher asks him to try out for the team. Obviously, Herman is excited about the offer. However, the dream ends when the other players start to refuse to play with Herman. Many of them got hurt because of the way Herman prevents a man from stealing a base or how hard he throws the ball. And Herman destroys parts of the baseball park. Grandpa shows Lily and Marilyn an article in the paper about Herman trying out for the team. Grandpa is thrilled, but Lily doesn't want Herman to be a big star player. Herman comes home and tells the family that the team just couldn't afford all the damage he would do. The family comfort Herman and tell him how much they need him. Later, Herman kicks a football for Eddie. He winds up hitting Elroy "Crazylegs" Hirsch in the head with the football. Ken Hunt as Fearful Catcher.
30	30	"Country Club Munsters"	Joseph Pevney	Douglas Tibbles	April 15, 1965
Herman learns from the TV Announcer (Johnny Jacobs) that the Munsters won a membership to the highly exclusive Mockingbird Heights Country Club. The family is very excited. Reginald Stubbs (Dan Tobin) and Mr. Petrie (Woodrow Parfrey), of the membership board, are not sure about having just anyone join the club. Mr. Murdock (J. Edward McKinley) thinks it could increase the popularity of the club. They decide to get a close look at the family to see if they meet the club's standards. They first organize a visit for Lily and Grandpa to a luncheon and fashion show. After Lily see some models talk about and show off what they are wearing, she does the same with her outfit. Meanwhile, Grandpa visits the bar and does some magic tricks for Duke Feinberg (Al Checco), the bartender. Lily and Grandpa come home and tell Marilyn how rude the people were at the club. They tell Herman that they don't want to join. However, Herman and Eddie go to the club the next day to play golf. Herman destroys the golf course with his strong swings and leaves his giant footprints in some areas. The afternoon paper talks about how something has destroyed the golf course. Herman decides he doesn't want to join a club that let's a madman roam loose there.
31	31	"Love Comes to Mockingbird Heights"	Joseph Pevney	Joe Connelly & Bob Mosher	April 22, 1965
The Munsters receive a large crate from Uncle Gilbert (Richard Hale) in Transylvania. Uncle Gilbert asks them to keep it until he arrives in a couple days. Turns out the crate contained $180,000 in Spanish gold doubloons. They decide to deposit the treasure in the bank. Alan Benson (Charles Robinson), from the bank, arrives to pick up the money. Alan and Marilyn are instantly attracted to each other and they spend some time together talking in the living room. Grandpa and Lily try to make things romantic. Things go wrong and Alan leaves. Alan and Marilyn go on a date and he mentions marriage. Grandpa receives a mysterious call claiming that Alan plans to elope with Marilyn and that he is only interested in Uncle Gilbert's money. Grandpa wants to use a spell on Marilyn to transport her to Transylvania for a couple days so they can confront Alan. But the spell goes wrong and everybody except Herman end up in a motel in Kansas City. Grandpa calls Herman to let him know what happened. Lily wants Herman to tell off Alan. When Alan arrives, he is frightened off by Herman. The family finally make it back home. Marilyn is disappointed about Alan, but Uncle Gilbert arrives to cheer the family up.
32	32	"Mummy Munster"	Ezra Stone	Joe Connelly & Bob Mosher	April 29, 1965
Lily asks Herman to drop Marilyn at the museum and then pick her up later. At the museum, Dr. Wilkerson (Philip Ober) tells Thatcher (Pat Harrington, Jr.) they have received a well preserved, unopened sarcophagus. Before Herman goes to pick up Marilyn, he takes an experimental sleeping pill invented by Grandpa. The pill can be set for a fall asleep time and a wake up time. Herman arrives late to the museum and he gets stuck inside. Looking for a phone, Herman believes that a sarcophagus is actually a phone booth. He gets stuck inside the sarcophagus and falls asleep. Wilkerson and Thatcher have some reporters there when they open the sarcophagus. Eddie sees in the paper an article about an ancient mummy, with a picture of Herman sleeping inside of the sarcophagus. Lily goes to the museum and claims that the mummy is her husband. Wilkerson believes that Lily intends to steal their mummy. Later, Herman wakes up and scares Thatcher away. At home, Herman takes another pill. Wilkerson arrives with the police and Lily says that there's no mummy. But they find Herman sleeping peacefully in the laboratory, and the police take him away. After hearing a joke from one of the policeman, Herman wakes up laughing inside of the museum van and scares Wilkerson and the policemen. Dennis Cross as Policeman.
33	33	"Lily Munster–Girl Model"	Earl Bellamy	Story by : Richard Conway; Teleplay by : Joe Connelly & Bob Mosher	May 6, 1965
Feeling useless, Lily wants to do something with her spare time, so she decides to find a job. She applies to various places, but none work out. Lily then applies as a model at Laszlo Brastoff (Roger C. Carmel) Couturier and gets the job. Herman gets angry and jealous, because he believes that there will be a lot of men flirting with her. After some other pills don't get the results they wanted, Grandpa gives Herman a pill that turns him into a Texas playboy. Despite Marilyn laughing at Herman, they will still go with the Texas look. Then, using his magic potions, Grandpa turns into a beautiful woman (Nina Shipman), in order to help Herman in a plan to make Lily jealous. They go to the fashion show and Lily sees the two of them. Grandpa pretends to flirt with Herman and Lily knocks a pole on them. Back at home, Herman tries to convince Lily that the woman was really Grandpa. Grandpa can't prove it because someone drank the rest of the potion. When Eddie comes into the room as a little girl (Kimberly Beck), Lily believes their story. John Alvin as Mr. Franklin.
34	34	"Munster the Magnificent"	Norman Abbott	James Allardice & Tom Adair	May 13, 1965
Eddie volunteers Herman as a performer for his school's talent night. Since Herman has no discernible talent, Grandpa conjures up a pair of magic ballet shoes that will make him a gifted dancer. Grandpa also has a bunch of jars with magic powder for almost every style of dance. Herman agrees to try the slippers and the magic powder, but the spell fails. Grandpa thinks he can adjust the shoes, but Herman decides to tell Eddie he can't perform. Before Herman can say anything, Eddie comes in and says he volunteered Herman as a magician. Herman tries some tricks, but he doesn't do well. Lily and Marilyn ask Grandpa to help Herman with the magic, but without him knowing. It's the night of the show. The Master of Ceremonies (Dave Ketchum) introduces Herman as Munster the Magnificent. Herman is a success with Marilyn as his assistant, and he even tells some jokes for his audience. However, he starts to get big-headed about his talent and decides to do a trick that wasn't planned by Grandpa. Herman wants to put Lily in a box and make her disappear. When he goes off stage to get Lily, Grandpa tells Herman that he has been doing the magic for him. Herman doesn't believe it. Herman puts Lily in the box and makes her disappear. Lily slips out of the back when Herman tries to make her reappear. Herman takes the box home. He tries to explain to Eddie that he messed up and Lily is gone forever. Lily sneaks back into the box. When Herman sees her, he promises to never do magic again. Eddie Ryder as The 1st Father. Stuart Nisbet as The 2nd Father.
35	35	"Herman's Happy Valley"	Ezra Stone	Richard Conway	May 20, 1965
Herman tells the family that he purchased 10 acres (40,000 m^{2}) in Happy Holiday Valley through a magazine ad. Herman isn't aware that the land was sold by some con artists. It turns out to be a patch of wasteland in a broken-down ghost town, so the Munsters absolutely adore it. Meanwhile, the crooks, Barney Walters (John Hoyt) and Gil Craig (Richard Reeves), are speaking with Mr. Curtis (Bartlett Robinson) of Cunningham Aeronautics. Mr. Curtis wants to buy the land to use as a missile site. Barney tells Gil that he's sure that after Herman sees the land, he'll be happy to sell it back. The men talk to Lily and offer double their money if they sell the land back to them. But, Lily says they wouldn't leave for any price. So, the crooks decide to scare the Munsters off. That night the crooks return. Gil sees a sign that says "Big Billy hanged on this spot June 6, 1872". Gil mentions that there's a story that Big Billy returns every year and today is June 6th. Nothing the men do seems to scare the family. It's actually Herman who frightens the men away when they think he's Big Billy. In the end, Herman sells the land to the company that wanted to build the missile site.
36	36	"Hot Rod Herman"	Norman Abbott	Joe Connelly & Bob Mosher	May 27, 1965
Eddie tells his friend Sandy Baylor that his father can beat Mr. Baylor (Henry Beckman) at the Mockingbird Heights drag strip. After Lily laughs at the idea, Herman agrees to race. A few things go wrong when Herman preps the Munsters Koach. Lily doesn't like when Herman dresses like a street punk. Herman and Eddie arrive at the drag strip. Grandpa reads in the paper that Sandy's father is 'Leadfoot' Baylor, a professional racer. Herman ends up losing the Munsters Koach on a bet with Mr. Baylor. Determined to win it back, Grandpa decides to construct his own roadster. He will beat 'Leadfoot' Baylor at his own game. Herman and Grandpa have been working for a week in the garage. Lily and Marilyn don't know what they're up to. The roadster is finished and they will call the Drag-u-la. Baylor arrives at the drag strip and tells Herman he's been working on the Munsters Koach all week. Herman makes the bet with Baylor. Once Baylor sees the Drag-u-la, he starts to worry. Baylor and his Mechanic (Edward Donno) try to sabotage the Drag-u-la. Despite this, Grandpa wins. Ray Montgomery as Father.
37	37	"Herman's Raise"	Ezra Stone	Story by : Douglas Tibbles; Teleplay by : Douglas Tibbles and Joe Connelly & Bob Mosher	June 4, 1965
Herman has been working extra hours at the parlor without receiving extra money. Grandpa thinks Herman is stupid for doing it. Egged on by Lily, Herman demands a raise from his boss Mr. Gateman (John Carradine). He is promptly fired. When Herman comes home early, Grandpa learns about what happened. Fearing Lily's reaction, Herman makes up a story that his boss will take a few days to think about it. Lily wants an answer by the end of the week. Herman pretends to be going to work, when he is actually trying out new jobs. He tries a boxer, a sewer worker and a boat welder. It's been a week and Lily is expecting to see more money on Herman's check. Lily finds out about Herman's situation. She confronts Grandpa who says Herman's been spending the week looking for work. Herman goes to Tom Fong's (Benny Rubin) laundry to get a job. Herman winds up making a mess of the laundry. Meanwhile, Lily decides to talk personally with Gateman. She tugs at Gateman's heartstrings and he gives Herman his job back plus the raise. Gateman calls Herman with the news and now Herman acts like a big shot.
38	38	"Yes, Galen, There Is a Herman"	Norman Abbott	Joe Connelly & Bob Mosher	June 10, 1965
Herman frees a young boy named Galen Livingston Stewart (Brian Nash) by bending the bars of a fence that his head is stuck between. Herman tells Galen he can call him 'Uncle Herman'. During dinner, Herman tries to tell the family that he saved a boys life. Herman has a hard time convincing his family that the boy is real. Meanwhile, Galen tells his parents that 'Uncle Herman' saved his life. After Galen describes what Herman looks like, his parents don't believe him. The next day Herman runs into Galen again. He beings the boy home to meet the family. They watch some home movies. Galen tells his parents about the Munsters and their house. They worry about Galen's vivid imagination. The Stewarts hire a German psychiatrist, Dr. Siegfried Leinbach (Harvey Korman), to examine their boy. Leinbach suggests that he have Galen show him this imaginary house and family. Leinbach sees the Munster house and figures it's vacant, until Marilyn answers the door. After Leinbach meets the Munsters, he believes he's in a bad dream. Marge Redmond as Mrs. Stewart. Walter Brooke as John Stewart. Note: Episode title aka "My Friend Herman"

=== Special (1965) ===
Title	Directed by	Written by	Original release date
"Marineland Carnival"	Bob Lehman	Charles E. Andrews with Bill Gamme	April 18, 1965
The family visits Marineland of the Pacific in Palos Verdes, California, to get a new pet for Eddie. A kinescope copy is kept by the Paley Center in New York. A DVD of the special was released in 2022 by MPI Home Video.

=== Season 2 (1965–66) ===
No. overall	No. in season	Title	Directed by	Written by	Original release date
39	1	"Herman's Child Psychology"	Ezra Stone	Joe Connelly & Bob Mosher	September 16, 1965
Eddie's friend Charlie Pike (Michel Petit) tells him that all parents are mean. Charlie says he's going to run away from home and live in a cave in the woods. Charlie suggests Eddie run away as well, but Eddie says his parents haven't been that mean yet. At dinner, Eddie gets upset when the family is very nice to him. Marilyn tells the family that Eddie said he is running away. Herman just thinks Eddie is looking for attention. Herman uses a little child psychology and encourages Eddie, which naturally backfires and Eddie leaves. Lily sends Herman out to look for Eddie. Meanwhile, Mr. White (Bill Quinn), from a local circus, discovers that Olga the Dancing Bear (Janos Prohaska) and her cub are missing. Eddie finds out that Charlie was only bluffing and says he might go somewhere on his own. Big Leo (Gene Blakely), and some other men from the circus, go looking for Olga in the woods. Herman finds the bear cub in a cave, believes it's Eddie and brings it home. At home, Herman learns that Eddie is already there and goes to return the cub. Herman befriends Olga and winds up dancing with her. Lily and Grandpa find them. Lily calls Olga a homewrecker, hits her on the head and chases her up a tree. Big Leo and the men later find Olga.
40	2	"Herman, the Master Spy"	Ezra Stone	Douglas Tibbles	September 23, 1965
The Munsters are off for a picnic at Paradise Cove. Meanwhile, a TV Announcer (Edwin Reimers) states that a Soviet Fishing Trawler has been spotted past the three mile limit near Paradise Cove. While out scuba diving, Herman is caught in the net of the Soviet Trawler. The Russians think they've caught a missing link between man and fish. Herman finds out that the Russians have learned to speak English from watching TV. The Americans intercept a message from the Trawler stating they have found the "Missing Link". They then intercept a message from Moscow that they believe Herman is a new kind of American spy. The family is back at home and Grandpa is trying to find Herman with his crystal ball. Herman has a good time entertaining the crew. Charlie (John Zaremba), from the State Department, sees a newspaper article about the Russians capturing an American spy. The State Dept. believes it to be a Soviet hoax. The family sees the drawing of Herman in the paper. The Commissar (Val Avery) tells the crew they must get rid of Herman, but the crew like him. Grandpa and Lily show up at the boat and find the crew giving Herman a farewell party with singing and dancing. An angry Lily drags Herman off the boat. Back at home, Grandpa convinces Lily to forgive Herman. Edward Mallory as The Young Man. Howard Wendell as John. Henry Hunter as The Older Man. Note: The scene that shows an exterior shot of the KNXT-TV studios (the station's call sign is now KCBS-TV) and Herman reading a story about the trawler was removed for syndication until 2011.
41	3	"Bronco-Bustin' Munster"	Ezra Stone	Story by : Richard Conway; Teleplay by : Joe Connelly & Bob Mosher	September 30, 1965
Eddie's misguided regard for his father's natural abilities prompts the young Munster to enter Herman in the bucking bronco contest at the local rodeo. Hank (William Phipps) and Ted (Don "Red" Barry), the organizers, think Herman must be a great rider from what they heard. They don't want anybody to ride off with the $500 prize money they are offering. To be on the safe side, they want to put Herman on Volcano, a horse nobody can ride. The rest of the family think that Herman could get hurt and are trying to talk him out of it. But Herman says he promised Eddie. Herman tries to use child psychology on Eddie, but it doesn't work. Scared and nervous, Herman asks Grandpa for help. Grandpa decides to turn himself into a horse so Herman at least knows whom he'll be riding. Grandpa makes a mistake and turns himself into a goat. He then turns into a skunk and then a pig. Grandpa finally takes the right pill and becomes the horse. At the rodeo, Grandpa turns back into himself, but he thinks he's still a horse. They can't make the switch and Herman winds up riding Volcano. Much to the family's relief, Herman manages to stay on the horse and win the prize. Herman faints when he learns it wasn't Grandpa he was riding. Richard Lane as The Announcer. Leonard P. Geer as The Cowpoke.
42	4	"Herman Munster, Shutterbug"	Earl Bellamy	Richard Conway	October 7, 1965
Herman has taken up photography as a new hobby. Herman's attempt to take a family photo doesn't go well. Meanwhile, Lily wants Eddie to practice the organ. Grandpa gives Eddie a pill to help him play better, but it doesn't work. Lou (Joe De Santis) and Rod (Herbie Faye) are planning to rob the local bank. Herman is out taking pictures and he frightens a Little Old Lady (Alma Murphy) who was feeding ducks. He then tries to take a picture of a statue of Daniel Boone (Bill Coontz). The statue is frightened away. Herman inadvertently snaps a picture of the bank robbers leaving the scene of the crime. Herman is too dumb to see what he's taken, so it's explained to him by Grandpa. The next day there is a front page story of the holdup and a report that an unidentified man was seen in the area taking pictures. Rod remembers a guy by the bank standing next to a car that looked like a hearse. The robbers soon locate the Munster's house by searching for the Munster's Koach. They hope to get their hands on the incriminating evidence. Lily wants Herman to call the police. Lou and Rod claim they are with the newspaper and would like to buy the picture. Herman recognizes them. The crooks decide to hole up with the Munsters until the heat is off. Grandpa comes up with a plan to get the crooks captured. Jess Kirkpatrick as Sgt. Baker. Bob Morgan as The Officer.
43	5	"Herman, Coach of the Year"	Norman Abbott	James Allardice & Tom Adair	October 14, 1965
Lily tells Herman that Eddie came home quite upset. Eddie says that he was called "Lead Foot" by the other kids on his track team. Herman decides to coach his boy to enter the big spring track meet. The rest of the family are not very impressed with Herman's training methods. Grandpa offers to help Eddie with some magic, but Herman wants the boy to do it by his own merits. Lily tells Grandpa that she doesn't think Herman is helping Eddie very much. So, Grandpa cooks up some special 'a-go-go' pills for Eddie. Grandpa tells Herman and Eddie the pills are vitamins. Eddie takes one pill and races all over. But, by the day of the meet, there are no more pills left. Lilly and Grandpa try to tell Herman that the pills weren't vitamins, but were magic. Herman still thinks it was his training that helped Eddie. Herman finally believes them. Eddie still wins several events. Herman frightens one of Eddie's teammates and the boy wins an event. Turns out Eddie stopped taking the pills after the first day and he hid them. Herman throws the pills out the window. A cat eats one and chases a large dog up a tree. Emmaline Henry as Gwendoline, the Accident-Prone Wife. Henry Beckman as Ralph, the Husband.
44	6	"Happy 100th Anniversary"	Ezra Stone	Douglas Tibbles	October 21, 1965
Herman and Grandpa are looking at old pictures, when Grandpa realizes that this Saturday will be Herman and Lily's 100th anniversary. Lily and Marilyn are talking about the anniversary. Herman and Lily want to buy each other elaborate gifts. Thinking the other has completely forgotten about it, both of them withdraw $1,000 from their bank account, and both checks bounce. Each still want to surprise the other with an amazing gift. Herman goes to see Mr. Parker (Robert Cornthwaite) at the Cleaver Employment Agency. Meanwhile, Lily goes to see Mr. Walpole (Jack Grinnage) at the same agency. They both wind up working as welders at the Crosby Shipyards. Marilyn and Grandpa find out the two are working at the same place and agree to not say anything. Herman and Lily don't recognize each other because of the welder's masks. The two start flirting with each other. Marilyn tells Lily she shouldn't be flirting with someone else. Grandpa tells Herman the same thing. Jack Poyer (Noam Pitlik), the supervisor, tells Herman and Lily separately that the Admiral (Foster Brooks) will be coming for an inspection. Things become awkward when the couple simultaneously discover each others 'secret' identity. Just when the Admiral shows up, Herman and Lily get into a fight and are fired. Grandpa and Marilyn bring the upset couple back together. Vinton Hayworth as Bank Manager. William O'Connell as The Bank Clerk.
45	7	"Operation Herman"	Norman Abbott	Story by : Richard Conway; Teleplay by : Joe Connelly & Bob Mosher	October 28, 1965
Eddie comes home upset, saying he will never talk to anyone again. Herman learns that the school nurse said Eddie needs to have his tonsils out and he doesn't want to do it. Herman tells Eddie it's a very simple operation. Herman and Eddie go to see Dr. Willoughby (Dayton Allen). Eddie has the operation and everything goes well. Lily tells Herman that Willoughby doesn't think he should visit Eddie as Herman might cause a scene. That night Grandpa and Herman sneak out and go to the hospital. Miss Hazlett (Marge Redmond), the Desk Nurse, mistakes Herman for an accident victim and goes to get help. Meanwhile, Lily discovers Herman is gone. Grandpa and Herman go to find Eddie's room. Grandpa dresses as a doctor and puts Herman on a hospital gurney. Grandpa walks away for a moment and Miss Hazlett finds the gurney. She brings it to Dr. Elliott (Don Keefer). Herman tries to explain that he is there to visit his son. Thinking he is delirious from the accident, Herman is given a dose of laughing gas. Grandpa finds him and brings him home. Lily thinks he's drunk, but Grandpa explains what happened. Bill Quinn as Attendant.
46	8	"Lily's Star Boarder"	Ezra Stone	Douglas Tibbles	November 4, 1965
Lily puts an ad in the paper to rent their spare room. Everyone but Herman thinks it's a great idea. Lily complains that they've had 27 applicants and not one was willing to cross the front door. Meanwhile, Spot comes home with a bumper off the car of neighbor Mr. Leonard (Buddy Lewis). A Chester Skinner (Charles Bateman) says he is willing to rent the room. Chester seems nice enough, only he refuses to explain his profession. Chester calls his boss and says he rented the room and everything is going smoothly. Herman gets jealous because everyone really likes Chester. Lily catches Herman spying on the family and Chester. After finding a gun and surveillance equipment in Chester's room, Herman and Grandpa are convinced their guest is on the wrong side of the law. What they don't know is that Chester is a Police Lieutenant. Herman calls Mr. Leonard to let him know he's being spied on. Turns out Mr. Leonard is a crook and he decides to pack up and leave. Herman and Grandpa plan an elaborate trap for Chester and then tie him up. They then learn that Chester is a Police Lieutenant. To make up for their mistake, Herman and Grandpa catch the crooks for Chester. Chet Stratton as Leonard's Accomplice (uncredited).
47	9	"John Doe Munster"	Earl Bellamy	Richard Baer	November 11, 1965
A 300-pound safe drops on Herman's head, causing him to develop amnesia. When Herman is late coming home, Lily starts to worry. Grandpa turns on the TV. An Announcer states that the police have taken a man with amnesia into protective custody and renamed him 'John Doe'. A picture is shown and it's Herman. Lily and Grandpa go to the police station. When Herman doesn't recognize them, the Desk Sgt. (Frank Maxwell) says he can't release Herman without a court order. In order to get him released into her custody, Lily petitions the court to adopt Herman as her son. The Judge (Willis Bouchey) has a hard time believing what is going on, but grants the adoption on a temporary basis. Herman starts acting like a child. He still doesn't show any sign of recognition after ten days. Lily and Grandpa come up with a plan to shock him back into Herman by having Grandpa disguise himself as Rock Hudson and pretend to woo Lily. Grandpa says he must have taken some old pills because he looks more like Rudolph Valentino. The plan doesn't work. But when Herman sees Eddie on the roof trying to fly a kite, it brings back his memory. Eddie falls off the roof and Herman catches him. Grandpa has a hard time making a pill that will change him back. Olan Soule as The Bailiff.
48	10	"A Man for Marilyn"	Ezra Stone	James Allardice & Tom Adair	November 18, 1965
Lily tells Herman that a boy drove Marilyn home from a wedding she went to. Herman goes to invite the boy in, but the boy is frightened and drives away. Marilyn wonders what's wrong with her, because all the boys always run off. To provide Marilyn with a future husband, Grandpa tries to turn a frog into a prince. Conveniently, he chooses a nearsighted frog who will not be put off by Marilyn's "hideous" looks. At first, the transformation doesn't happen. When the rest of the family is out to the drive-in, Marilyn accidentally locks herself in her room. A young man named Ted Bradley (Roger Perry) passes by and mistakenly thinks she is being held prisoner. Ted climbs up to Marilyn's room and then breaks open her door. Just then the family comes home and when Ted sees them, he takes Marilyn back to her room. He tells her that he is going for help. Marilyn tells the family about Ted. Herman and Grandpa assume Ted is the frog, turned into a prince. Ted is still outside because Spot stopped him. Herman and Grandpa tie him up and bring him in the dungeon. Lily has Marylin try on a black wedding gown. Ted talks Eddie into untying him and leaves. Herman and Grandpa find the frog and assume the spell wore off. Ted tells the police about Marilyn. The police investigate and believe the Munsters and the house are all part of a college fraternity prank. Marilyn later runs into Ted, but wants nothing to do with him after he insults her family. Don Edmonds as Frank Colson. Dick Wilson as Al the Policeman. Dave Willock as Harry the Policeman.
49	11	"Herman's Driving Test"	Ezra Stone	Richard Conway	November 25, 1965
Herman gets promoted to hearse driver. Lily points out that his drivers license expired 20 years ago. He now has to renew his driver's license and Lily tells him to get a book of traffic rules to study. Herman isn't concerned. But then Herman flunks the test. Mr. Gateman, from the parlor, calls and tells Lily that Herman's first driving job is this coming Monday. At the Motor Vehicle Department, Mr. Foster (Francis DeSales) asks driving instructor Mr. Howell (Irwin Charone) to ride with Herman. It took Herman over 4 hours to finish the written test, but he passed. Despite going on a wild drive, Herman is issued a temporary license, the real one will come in the mail. Herman is so excited that he crashes into Mr. Howell's car and his license is taken away. Grandpa suggests that Herman go to some small town and try to pass the test there. They go to tiny Groverville. There they meet near-sighted and disoriented Charlie Wiggens (Charlie Ruggles). At first Charlie thinks they want a marriage license. After much confusion, Herman is tested and gets his license. But, it turns out that the hearse Herman will drive is horse driven.
50	12	"Will Success Spoil Herman Munster?"	Ezra Stone	Story by : Lou Shaw; Teleplay by : Lou Shaw and Joe Connelly & Bob Mosher	December 2, 1965
Eddie borrows a tape recorder belonging to Dick Willet (Gary Owens), the disc-jockey father of one of his friends, Bud. After Eddie goes to bed, Herman starts playing with the recorder. Herman records his own version of "Dry Bones" while playing the guitar (the guitarist heard is Gwynne himself, who played Herman). Willet plays it on his radio show the next day. The family hears the song on the radio not knowing it's Herman and thinks it's awful. However, the song is an over-night sensation and the radio station is offering a 5 year recording contract to the mystery singer. The family finds out it was Herman singing when he calls the radio station. Herman's record remains around the top of the charts and he starts acting conceited. Herman tells Lily that he'll appearing on TV. Lily starts to wonder if success will spoil Herman. She dreams that Herman appears before a Judge (Nolan Leary) because he is divorcing her due to his stardom. The next day, Lily tells the family that they need to stop Herman's music career. Grandpa hopes to ruin Herman's voice with "nothin' muffins", which turn everything good into nothing. Herman won't eat a muffin as he's on a strict diet before going on TV. Grandpa finds a way for Herman to eat one and his voice sounds like a squeaky toy. The family explains why they did it. Herman understands and gives up the idea of stardom.
51	13	"Underground Munster"	Don Richardson	Joe Connelly & Bob Mosher	December 16, 1965
Spot runs away from home after Herman scolds him for leaving mud prints all over the house. Eddie is sad that Spot is gone. Herman couldn't find Spot around the neighborhood. Marilyn shows the family a newspaper article stating a giant lizard was sighted in the sewer. Marilyn goes to city hall to claim Spot. Mayor Handley (J. Edward McKinley), who is facing reelection, thinks the story about the lizard is a hoax to make his administration look bad. Marilyn arrives at Handley's office and is followed by two reporters and a photographer. Marilyn is turned away by the Mayor. Herman then goes down into the sewer to look for Spot, but gets lost himself. Some Workman (John Mitchum and Buck Kartalian) see Herman and are frightened away. They tell the Mayor what they saw. Soon local newspaper men have branded Spot a giant lizard monster and Herman its 'mate'. The Mayor decides to bomb the sewers in order to get rid of the creatures once and for all. Lily and Grandpa rush to stop the bombing from happening. But an explosion actually brings Spot and Herman together. Grandpa thinks he's invented a machine that can rig the election, but it doesn't work. Helen Kleeb as The 1st Woman. Elsie Baker as The 2nd Woman. Warren Parker as Ted. Hoke Howell as The 2nd Reporter.
52	14	"The Treasure of Mockingbird Heights"	Charles R. Rondeau	George Tibbles	December 23, 1965
A storm has knocked out the power in the Munster home. While searching for a fuse box in the dungeon, Herman and Grandpa discover a secret chamber. On the wall is written a clue to Henry Morgan's pirate treasure hidden on the Munsters' property. The clue leads them to find a treasure map. The two are in the backyard trying to follow the clues in the map. Lily and Marilyn are touched to see the two men working so closely together to find it. Something Eddie says, helps them with a clue. It's not long before they dig up the treasure chest. But now Herman and Grandpa's partnership turns to suspicion and rivalry. Then they start fighting over its ownership and Lily has to intervene. But, when they continue fighting, Lily tells them she gave the treasure to the Rescue Mission. Note: This was the only episode with no actors other than the five regular cast members, not even uncredited extras.
53	15	"Herman's Peace Offensive"	Ezra Stone	Douglas Tibbles	December 30, 1965
Eddie is being bullied at school by Jack McGinty (Jackie Minty) and he's very angry about it. Herman advises his son to turn the other cheek. Herman then has a practical joke pulled on him by Clyde Thornton (Chet Stratton), a new man at work. Herman then says he's going to kill Clyde. At school, Jack threatens Eddie again. At work, Clyde pulls another practical joke on Herman. When Herman and Eddie both come home with a black eye, Herman decides it's time to do something about it. Grandpa helps Eddie and Herman learn how to box. Lily asks Herman if he's encouraging Eddie to fight and Herman says no. The next day at school, Eddie punches Jack. Clyde is about to play another joke on Herman. But when he sees how strong Herman is, he changes his mind. A frightened Clyde apologizes for what he did and Herman is able to play a small practical joke on him. That evening, Herman and Eddie brag to Grandpa about what they did and what they're going to do. Lily over hears and tells Herman that the school principal called and said that Eddie is turning into a bully. She tells him she will not tolerate violence and she knocks Herman down a couple times. Bryan O'Byrne as Uriah.
54	16	"Herman Picks a Winner"	Ezra Stone	Richard Conway	January 6, 1966
Eddie was sent home from school for gambling. Trying to teach Eddie about the folly of gambling, Herman bets the $10 in Eddie's piggy bank on a long shot. He places the bet at a local dry cleaning store that is also a bookie joint. The horse comes in a winner and Eddie now has $300. This completely ruins Herman's lesson. But Herman decides to continue the lesson and take his winnings and bet it on another long shot. That horse also winds up winning and Eddie now has $14,000. The bookies, Lefty (Charlie Callas), Big Roy (Barton MacLane) and Vic (Sammy Shore), start to panic about having to pay off the bet. Believing Herman has inside information, Big Roy wants Herman to work for them. Big Roy calls the seductive Lou (Joyce Jameson) to help persuade Herman. Lou uses her charms to get Herman to go with her. Lily is worried because Herman is late coming home from work. She tells Grandpa that maybe Herman went to pick up his winnings and was robbed. Lily finds out that it was Grandpa that magically caused those horses to win. Big Roy, pretending to be Lou's father, gets Herman to pick a horse for him. The bookies prevent Herman from leaving until the race is over. The horse loses, but Grandpa, after turning into a bat, helps Herman escape. Herman turns the bookies in to the police.
55	17	"Just Another Pretty Face"	Gene Reynolds	Richard Baer	January 13, 1966
Grandpa claims to be working on a machine that will bring about world peace. Grandpa orders Herman to stay out of the dungeon. Herman sneaks into the laboratory that night and starts to play with the machine. An alarm goes off in Grandpa's room and he heads for the dungeon. Just as he gets there, a lightning bolt from the machine strikes Herman in the head. Herman is disfigured so severely that he ends up resembling a normal person. Herman is shocked when he sees his reflection in a mirror. He gets upset when Lily won't let him kiss her. Lily takes Herman to see Dr. Dudley (Dom DeLuise) and ask him if anything can be done with plastic surgery. Dudley tells them that no plastic surgeon would change Herman back to the way he was. Grandpa finds Herman's original blue prints, which were a gift from Dr. Frankenstein. Lily thinks it will be too dangerous, but Herman wants Grandpa to try. The attempt turns Herman into a female version of his old self. Lily tells the family that Herman got a job as a cocktail waitress. When Herman steps outside into a rain storm, he is hit by another bolt of lightning and restored to his former self. Note: The "disfigured" Herman is actually Fred Gwynne minus the monster makeup. This episode was remade for The Munsters Today, starring John Schuck as Herman.
56	18	"Big Heap Herman"	Ezra Stone	Joe Connelly & Bob Mosher	January 20, 1966
Despite everyone else wanting to vacation at the beach, Herman decides on Buffalo Valley. Marilyn says she can't go as she has tests at school. The Munsters head for Buffalo Valley by train. Grandpa and Herman have to share a berth and it doesn't go well. While looking for her berth, Lily frightens a Man (Richard Jury). Herman frightens many of the passengers. Herman gets off at a rest stop in Indian Flats while the family is asleep. He then falls asleep himself, causing him to miss the train and end up all alone. Meanwhile, in the village of a Native American tribe, Wonga (Ned Romero) and Manikoo (Len Lesser) are talking about how to bring in more tourists. Chief Powatuma (Felix Locher) says prosperity will return to the tribe when the mighty spirit Manitoba returns from the desert. Lily, Grandpa and Eddie realize Herman isn't on the train and manage to get back to Indian Flats. Herman wanders into the village where he is mistaken for the mighty spirit. The tribe wants Herman to pretend to marry an Indian girl (Sally Frei) to bring in tourists. When the family finds Herman, Lily puts a stop to the marriage.
57	19	"The Most Beautiful Ghoul in the World"	Ezra Stone	Ted Bergman	January 27, 1966
The Munsters receive $10,000 inheritance money from Cousin Wolverine. Herman wants to use the money to develop one of Granpda's inventions. Lily wants to use it to start her own business. Marilyn suggests they split the money and see who puts it to the best use. Grandpa has an invention for transmitting wireless electricity. Lily and Marilyn use their half to open their own beauty salon. Wealthy Mrs. Harkness (Elvia Allman) and her daughter Dorothea (Mary Mitchel) come to "Madame Lily's Beauty Shop". Grandpa is finished with his invention and at first it works. Grandpa then tries to turn on all the street lights in town. Herman and Grandpa's invention blows up in their faces and all the street lights blow up. Meanwhile, Mrs. Harkness and Dorothea faint when they see the results of their makeover. They go to see attorney Mr. Holmes (Charles Lane) as they want to sue Lily. Holmes sends a letter to Lily demanding the women be restored to their original beauty. The town is fining Grandpa $1000 for destroying municipal property or they be sent to jail. After Mrs. Harkness and Dorothea see Lily a second time, they leave bald. Lily learns that this happened because Grandpa tried controlling the electricity to the salon. In the end, there is a money making use for Grandpa's machine, but he has already destroyed it. Adele Claire as The Secretary.
58	20	"Grandpa's Lost Wife"	Ezra Stone	Douglas Tibbles	February 3, 1966
A lady in Sioux City, Iowa, has placed an advertisement in a magazine offering a $1000 reward for the return of Grandpa. Herman writes a letter to the woman wanting to claim the reward, but Lily talks him out of mailing it. Herman wonders if Grandpa did something bad that he's being searched for. Herman then calls Pamela Thornton (Jane Withers) to ask why she is looking for Grandpa. She says that she is Grandpa's wife. Grandpa claims to have never seen the woman before in his life. Grandpa learns about Herman's letter and wants to destroy it. Turns out Eddie mailed the letter. Pamela arrives at the Munster home. Lily and Marilyn won't tell Pamela where Grandpa is. The Munsters receive a letter from Clarence J. Wedge (Douglas Evans), a lawyer that Pamela hired. Grandpa is to appear at a hotel or he will be prosecuted as a wife deserter. Grandpa goes to see Pamela, and believing that she is rich, he signs a paper that Clarence gives him stating he is her husband. Grandpa comes home and tells Herman and Lily that he's moving in with Pamela. Grandpa then finds out it is all a scam so that Pamela can gain an inheritance. Grandpa goes home and begs to be taken back into the family.
59	21	"The Fregosi Emerald"	Ezra Stone	Richard Baer	February 10, 1966
Eddie gives Marilyn a ring he found in the attic as a birthday present. Grandpa recognizes it as the Fregosi Emerald and faints. When Grandpa comes to, Marilyn has already left for a date with Roger Davis. Lily is excited because it's her fourth date with Roger. Grandpa tells Lily and Herman that the Fregosi Emerald is a centuries-old ring with a Transylvanian curse. Marilyn has several bad things happen to her while she is out on the date and her and Roger break up. Herman doesn't believe in the curse and has Lily wear the ring the next day. While Lily is wearing the ring, bad things happen at breakfast. Still not convinced, Herman puts on the ring. After another mishap, Herman finds he can't remove the ring from his finger. Grandpa discovers the curse can only be removed by a living member of the Fregosi family. Grandpa calls the Transylvania Telephone Operator (Louise Glenn). She tells him that the last descendant lives in Detroit and runs Amalgamated Motors. Grandpa, Herman and Lily go to see Henry J. Fregosi (Paul Reed). At first Henry denies having ancestors that came from Transylvania. When Herman shows Henry the ring, he admits to having knowledge about it and the curse. Henry brings the three into his hidden laboratory in his office. He removes the curse and the ring falls off Herman's hand. Back at home, another problem arises when Eddie finds a cursed ruby and Herman accidentally swallows it. Joan Swift as The 1st Secretary. Marilyn Bell as The 2nd Secretary. Note: Guest star Paul Reed reunites with series regulars Fred Gwynne and Al Lewis, all 3 having starred in Car 54, Where Are You? from 1961-1963.
60	22	"Zombo"	Ezra Stone	Dennis Whitcomb	February 17, 1966
Eddie, an avid fan of ghoulish TV host Zombo (Louis Nye), becomes the winner of the "Why I Like Zombo Contest'. Eddie wins a lot of prizes and he gets to be on The Zombo Show. Herman becomes jealous of Eddie's new hero. Eddie's friends congratulate him and decide to start a Zombo club. Grandpa tells Herman that this infatuation with Zombo will blow over. But then all of Eddie's prizes show up. Even Lily and Marilyn comment on how good looking Zombo is. Herman feels even worse. Grandpa gives Herman a potion so he will appear as equally outlandish as Zombo. Hopefully Eddie will consider his dad a hero again. However, Eddie and his friends are not impressed with the way Herman looks. Eddie is embarrassed. Lily and Eddie go to the TV studio where they meet Dave Svensen (Digby Wolfe), the Director. Eddie is disappointed when he sees Zombo without his make-up. When on the show, Eddie tells everyone that Zombo is a fake and starts removing his make up. Back at home, Eddie and Herman start bonding again. Zombo is actually happy, as he wanted to get out of his contract anyway. Gary Owens as Announcer for The Zombo Show. Jackie Minty as Tommy. Jimmy Stiles as Billy. Mike Barton as Frank.
61	23	"Cyrano de Munster"	Joseph Pevney	Douglas Tibbles	February 24, 1966
Herman has his poetry published in The Mortician Monthly. Shy co-worker Clyde (Chet Stratton) tells Herman that he met a girl on the bus and he's in love with her. Clyde would like Herman to compose love letters to help him attract the attention of the young lady. Herman tells him he'll try. Later, Grandpa asks Herman why he's writing the love letter in the dungeon. Herman says that he's hiding from Lily. Clyde is very pleased with the letter Herman wrote. Lily finds a letter in the dungeon and becomes suspicious. Marilyn says she's sure Herman will give it to her soon. Clara (Joan Staley), the woman that Clyde is in love with, shows the letter to her friend Ann Carter (Eileen O'Neill). Clara now has feelings for Clyde. Herman goes to drop off another letter to Clyde. Lily is upset because Herman has not mentioned the letter to her yet. Clyde leaves a note for Herman saying he has already taken Clara to Lover's Lane and could Herman bring the letter there. Things get confusing at Lover's Lane. When Clara finds out that Herman is the one who has been writing the wonderful poetry, she sets out to hook up with him. Lily decides to go to Clyde's house to see if Herman is meeting a woman there. Herman starts to believe that it's Lily that Clyde met on the bus. Clara shows up at Herman's house and after seeing Herman, she runs away screaming. Lily and Clyde show up just as Clara is running away. Herman explains everything to Lily.
62	24	"The Musician"	Ezra Stone	Richard Baer	March 3, 1966
Mr. Gateman (John Carradine) tells Herman that every child should learn a musical instrument. Grandpa gets into a fight with Herman because he doesn't think a child should be forced to do anything. Eddie comes home with a trumpet and he is not thrilled about it. It's been a couple weeks and Eddie's trumpet playing is not improving. Grandpa makes a potion to turn Eddie from a rotten trumpet player into a classical music virtuoso. He slips it into Eddie's lemonade. The family is thrilled with Eddie's improved playing. Herman invites Mr. Gateman over for dinner. But when Eddie needs to duplicate the performance for Herman's boss, Grandpa cannot remember the exact formula of the potion. A classical music buff, Mr. Gateman is appalled when Eddie plays jazz music. Gateman fires Herman. Later, Grandpa confesses to the family about what he did. Eddie is not interested in going to school because he says education is "squaresville". The potion is starting to wear off. Coming back later, Gateman apologizes and gives Herman his job back. Gateman would also like to hear Eddie play again. Because the potion has worn off, he is subjected to Eddie's rotten playing.
63	25	"Prehistoric Munster"	Joseph Pevney	Douglas Tibbles	March 10, 1966
Eddie sends in Herman's picture to a Father Of The Year contest. Marilyn brings home a lump of clay to use for an art class project. Herman and Grandpa each think they would make a good model. Marilyn decides to sculpt a clay bust in Herman's likeness. Eddie tells the family the prizes for the Father Of The Year contest which includes a trip to Hawaii. Marilyn tells Art Professor Fagenspahen (Harvey Korman) that the sculpture represents a living person. She tells Fagenspahen the model was her uncle and he's 151 years old. Fagenspahen shows a picture of the sculpture to Theodore Hansen (George Petrie), Professor of Anthropology. Fagenspahen tells Hansen that the sculpture is of Marilyn's Uncle Herman. They plan to make a bundle from their discovery of a missing link. When they send a letter to Herman for him to come in to be examined, Herman thinks he won the contest. Herman goes to see Fagenspahen and Hansen and he mentions the contest. They first want to have a Young Doctor (Dick Poston) examine Herman. Back at home, Eddie tells Lily and Grandpa that Herman didn't win the contest. He sent the picture in after the deadline. Lily wonders who Herman is meeting with. Herman later learns that he didn't win the contest and throws a tantrum. The professors are fired because the school thought their story about Herman being the missing link was a hoax.
64	26	"A Visit from Johann"	Gene Reynolds	Joe Connelly & Bob Mosher	March 17, 1966
Dr. Victor Frankenstein, IV (John Abbott) calls Herman from Germany. He will be coming to Mockingbird Heights with something that might interest Herman. Later, Herman gets another call from Victor, who is at a local hotel. Lily reminds Herman that they are going to Happy Valley Lodge for the weekend. Herman goes to see Victor. Herman meets Johann (Fred Gwynne, in a dual role), Herman's look-alike cousin, who is far less civilized than Herman. Victor would like Herman to help Johann become more cultured. But Herman must do it secretly, not even telling Lily. Herman agrees to take Johann home to teach him some manners with the help of Grandpa. Lily and Marilyn ask Herman what he's been doing in the dungeon the last few days. Johann escapes from the dungeon. Unfortunately, Lily mistakes Johann for her husband and takes him to Happy Valley Lodge. Herman comes home from work and Grandpa realizes that Lily took Johann. When Grandpa and Herman call Lily, she tells them Herman is with her and they should stop playing practical jokes. Grandpa and Herman then ask Victor for help. Victor tries to reach Johann telepathically and Johann leaves the Lodge. Things are eventually explained to Lily and Victor takes Johann back to Germany. Forrest Lewis as The Motel Manager. Helen Kleeb as The Manager's Wife. Note: Johann's idiot savant behavior is similar to that of Boris Karloff's in the 1931 film version of Frankenstein complete with a fear of fire.
65	27	"Eddie's Brother"	Ezra Stone	Richard Conway	March 24, 1966
Both Herman and Lily faint when Eddie tells them he wants a baby brother. Lily tells Herman that it's natural for Eddie to want some companionship. Herman tries to be Eddies pal and play with him, but things don't go well. Herman wants to talk to Lily about the possibility of another baby. Grandpa thinks Herman should take out a bunch of baby things and Lily might come up with the idea herself. That plan doesn't work. Lily then says if they had a baby now, there would be too much of an age difference between the baby and Eddie. So Grandpa builds Eddie a robot boy named Boris (Rory Stevens). But Eddie becomes resentful when Boris' good behavior garners all of Herman's attention and admiration. When Eddie sees Boris sitting in Herman's lap while he reads him a story, Eddie runs away in his pajamas. The family sends Spot out to look for Eddie. Eddie is found in a tree outside. The family tells Eddie how much they love him. The family catches Boris trying to run away. Eddie apologizes to Boris and now the two get along. Boris moves to Death Valley to live with relatives. Eddie makes friends with a girl named Sally (Wendy B. Kottler), who likes the same things he does.
66	28	"Herman, the Tire-Kicker"	Ezra Stone	James Allardice & Tom Adair	March 31, 1966
Noticing how often Marilyn has to take a bus to school, the family wants to buy her a car. Herman is getting a bonus and will use that money. Grandpa laughs at the idea of putting Herman in charge of getting the car. Herman buys an old Chevrolet convertible from disreputable used-car dealer Fair Deal Dan (Frank Gorshin). Once he gets it home, it turns out to be a piece of junk and completely falls apart. Lily tells him to take the car back and demand his money back. Then they will report Dan. What they don't know is that the car was also stolen. Herman and Grandpa try to return the car but Fair Deal Dan is long gone. On the way home, they are stopped by police. Grandpa turns into a bat and flies away. Officers Spengler (Pat McCaffrie) and Corbett (Rian Garrick) think Herman is drunk and give him a sobriety test. The Officers arrest Herman because of the stolen car. The family goes to see Sgt. Stockwell (Dennis Cross) and they bail out Herman. While they are waiting, the police bring in a drunken Fair Deal Dan. Dan sees Herman and confesses. Johnny Silver as Blinky. Sol Gorss as The 1st Drunk. Jack Perkins as The 2nd Drunk. Fred Carson as The 3rd Drunk. Jack Wilson as The Driver. Jimmy Cross as Beasley.
67	29	"A House Divided"	Ezra Stone	Richard Conway	April 7, 1966
Lily tells Eddie that Herman and Grandpa are in the garage working on a secret project. Eddie says that maybe it's his birthday present as his birthday is soon. Eddie is caught in a trap when he tries to sneak a look in the garage. The next day, Lily tries to go talk to Herman and Grandpa in the garage and is caught in a different trap. Eddie is still at school when Herman and Grandpa bring the go-cart they constructed for Eddie outside. An argument erupts between Herman and Grandpa after Herman destroys the go-cart when he accidentally takes it for a test drive. They decide to split the house down the middle with a white line and agree to stay on opposite sides of it. Eddie comes home and wonders what the white line is for. More childishness ensues between the two men. Lily and Marilyn try to get them to work out their differences, with no luck. It's Eddie's birthday the next morning. Lily then forces them to work through the night to make Eddie another present. Herman and Grandpa manage to construct another go-cart to give to Eddie. The next morning Eddie is not thrilled with the present. But then Eddie gets excited when he realizes that the go-cart can fly. While Herman is cleaning up the white lines, he and Grandpa get into an argument over what TV show they're going to watch.
68	30	"Herman's Sorority Caper"	Ezra Stone	Douglas Tibbles	April 14, 1966
The family is going to a drive-in movie. A couple college students come by the house and say it's a perfect place for a college initiation. Herman comes home with a bad case of the hiccups after a scary movie at the drive-in. To cure Herman of his hiccups, Grandpa puts him into a trance. Phil (David Macklin) and John (Ken Osmond), a couple of fraternity pledges, are sent to spend a night in the Munster house, thinking it to be abandoned. They look around the house. They find Grandpa hanging upside down in the dungeon. They then mistake the frozen Herman for an elaborate dummy. They sneak him out of the house to leave him at the Alpha Kappa Sorority as a prank. The next morning, Lily is worried because Herman is missing. Grandpa tells her that he can snap Herman out of the trance no matter where he is. Herman awakes from his trance in a girl's closet at the sorority house. He tries to leave, but there are girls everywhere. Herman manages to call home, but when Lily finds out where he is, she hangs up on him. Herman is hiding in Cindy (Vicki Draves) and Janice's (Bonnie Franklin) room, under their bed. Grandpa has turned into a bat and comes to rescue him. The bat scares the girls and they run out of the room. Herman escapes by jumping out the window. Grandpa doesn't realize that his bat pill has worn off. He is caught by Campus Policemen. Vicki Fee as 1st Girl. Hedy Scott as 2nd Girl. Michael Ross as The Campus Policeman. William Fawcett as The Janitor. Frank Gardner as Ralph. Michael Blodgett as Jim. Note: Guest star Ken Osmond had appeared as "Eddie Haskell" in Leave It to Beaver, whose creators/producers Joseph Connelly and Robert "Bob" Mosher also produced The Munsters.
69	31	"Herman's Lawsuit"	Ezra Stone	Douglas Tibbles and Joe Connelly & Bob Mosher	April 21, 1966
When Herman gets hit by a car, he emerges unscathed while the car is destroyed. Marge Kingsley (Dorothy Green), the driver of the vehicle, thinks she has disfigured Herman for life and runs off to get an ambulance. Believing it was his fault, Herman goes home to call his insurance company, but Lily stops him from calling. Meanwhile, Marge shows her husband Wilbur (Simon Scott) Herman's license that she found in the street. Wilbur suggests they offer Herman a cash settlement by mail in the hopes he won't sue her for everything she has got. Herman and the family get confused when they get the offer. They think that they owe the woman 10,000 dollars for the damage to the car. Marge is worried as it's been three days and they haven't heard from Herman. Wilbur says that Ted Thatcher (Jerome Cowan), their lawyer, will go see the Munsters. Thatcher meets Lily and Grandpa as Herman isn't home. Thatcher thinks the family is poor and could win a court case. He calls Marge and recommends they double their cash offer. When Marge offers to double her cash settlement offer, Herman thinks he owes even more. Lily learns the true nature of the cash settlement after a talk with Marge. Lily accepts $1.75 to have Herman's suit cleaned. Meanwhile, afraid that he could never raise the money, Herman abandons his family and runs away. He tries to take part-time jobs all over to support himself. Lily teams up with Grandpa to find Herman and get him back home. Than Wyenn as The Legionnaire Capt. Fabian Dean as The Foreman. Eddie Marr as The Man. Bob Harvey as The Customer. Monroe Arnold as The Movie Director.
70	32	"A Visit from the Teacher"	Ezra Stone	Joe Connelly & Bob Mosher	May 12, 1966
Grandpa invents a machine that stores electricity from lighting bolts, but it doesn't work as well as it should. Eddie asks Herman to help him with a composition entitled "My Parents: An Average American Family" for school. Grandpa continues to have problems with his invention. Eddie finishes his composition and reads it to the family. Eddie reads his paper to the class and it vividly describes his family. Miss Thompson (Pat Woodell), his teacher, and Mr. Bradley (Willis Bouchey), the principal, think what he has written is the product of an overactive imagination. They decide to head over to the Munster house to see for themselves. Eddie asks the family to not embarrass him when Miss Thompson and Mr. Bradley arrive. Once there, Miss Thompson and Mr. Bradley are surprised at how run down the house is. They meet Marilyn and find her to be quite normal. They soon realize everything Eddie said about his family was true. After they meet Herman, they leave quite frightened. Giving up on his electricity machine, Grandpa tries to create his own water supply. This invention also doesn't work too well.
