= Adam's Rib (TV series) =

American television series - 1973

- Created by: Peter H. Hunt
- Starring: Ken Howard; Blythe Danner; Dena Dietrich; Ron Rifkin; Edward Winter; Norman Bartold
- Opening theme: "Two People" by Perry Botkin Jr.
- Composers: Perry Botkin, Jr.; Gil Garfield; Herschel Burke Gilbert; Vic Mizzy; Stanley Myers; Irving Gertz
- Country of origin: United States
- Original language: English
- No. of seasons: 1
- No. of episodes: 13

Production
- Running time: 30 minutes
- Production company: MGM Television

Original release
- Network: ABC
- Release: September 14 – December 28, 1973

Adam's Rib is an American sitcom broadcast on ABC from September 14 to December 28, 1973. Thirteen episodes were produced by MGM Television. The series was a TV adaptation of the 1949 MGM motion picture of the same name.

== Plot ==
Adam Bonner was a young assistant DA while his wife, Amanda Bonner, was a junior partner in a law firm. Their jobs often put them in conflict within the courtroom and, by extension, at home due to Amanda's crusade for women's rights.

Adam's Rib aired opposite The Brian Keith Show on NBC and the CBS Friday Night Movie. The trade publication Broadcasting described Adam's Rib as "a victim of feeble ratings".

== Cast ==
- Ken Howard as Adam Bonner
- Blythe Danner as Amanda Bonner
- Dena Dietrich as Gracie
- Ron Rifkin as Assistant District Attorney Ray Mendelson
- Edward Winter as Kip Kipple
- Norman Bartold as District Attorney Donahue

== Episodes ==
No.	Title	Directed by	Written by	Original release date	Prod. code
1	"Illegal Aid"	Peter H. Hunt	Peter Stone	September 14, 1973	001
Amanda's plan to prove that a girl can get arrested for picking up a man goes awry when she gets arrested.
2	"Two Pairs of Pants"	Peter H. Hunt	Mary Stone	September 21, 1973	007
Amanda is refused entry into an exclusive French restaurant because she's wearing a pink pantsuit. In response, she buys a man's suit for herself and a dress for Adam.
3	"Danish Party"	Peter H. Hunt	Richard Baer	September 28, 1973	004
Amanda defends a theater owner showing X-rated films, a man that Adam is prosecuting as assistant district attorney. David Doyle and Anne Seymour guest star.
4	"Separate Vacation"	Peter H. Hunt	George Kirgo	October 5, 1973	002
Adam's plans to take a vacation alone when Amanda can't leave a case backfires when a beautiful girl decides he is fair game. Jamie Smith-Jackson guest stars.
5	"The Unwritten Law: Part 1"	Peter H. Hunt	Ruth Gordon & Garson Kanin & Peter Stone	October 12, 1973	008
Amanda uses the "unwritten law" in defending a woman (Madeline Kahn) who shot her husband, with Adam prosecuting the case. Arthur O'Connell, Allen Garfield and Tony Ballen guest star.
6	"The Unwritten Law: Part 2"	Peter H. Hunt	Ruth Gordon & Garson Kanin & Mary Stone	October 19, 1973	009
The verdict results in a hung jury, which Amanda considers a victory. However, Adam has the final word.
7	"Katey at the Bat"	Gary Nelson	George Kirgo	October 26, 1973	010
Amanda and Adam are both trying to help Katey play baseball. She's been kicked out of the Midget League by the Commissioner, even though she's better than any boy. Maury Wills and Dick Van Patten guest star.
8	"Delilah"	Peter H. Hunt, Gary Nelson	Pamela Chais	November 2, 1973	006
Amanda defends a woman who beat up a man over job discrimination, which causes conflict between her and Adam. Herbert Anderson, Liam Dunn, Art Metrano and Leigh Curran guest star.
9	"For Richer, for Poorer"	Gary Nelson	Nora Ephron & Dan Greenburg & George Kirgo	November 9, 1973	005
Adam's former girlfriend asks for help when her husband, who's being represented by Amanda, sues her for alimony. Michele Carey and Howard Morton guest star.
10	"Murder"	Peter H. Hunt	George Kirgo	November 16, 1973	011
In a spoof of old-time mystery films, Adam investigates the death of a millionaire. Stephen Nathan, Katherine Helmond, Barbette Tweed and Robert Walden guest star.
11	"Friend of the Family"	Peter H. Hunt	Leonard Gershe	November 30, 1973	013
The attention that Kip is paying to Amanda causes tension between the Bonners. Eduard Franz and Robert Sampson guest star.
12	"The First Hurrah"	Peter H. Hunt	George Kirgo	December 7, 1973	012
Amanda takes a crack at politics when she's tapped to run for councilwoman. George Kirgo and Hank Brandt guest star.
13	"Too Many Cooks"	Gary Nelson	Jane-Howard Hammerstein	December 28, 1973	003
Amanda's plan to show Adam that cooking for her is a pleasure not a duty backfires when he brings a judge home unexpectedly. Candice Rialson, Lurene Tuttle and Cathey Paine guest star.
