= Hotel Habana Libre =

Hotel in Havana, Cuba

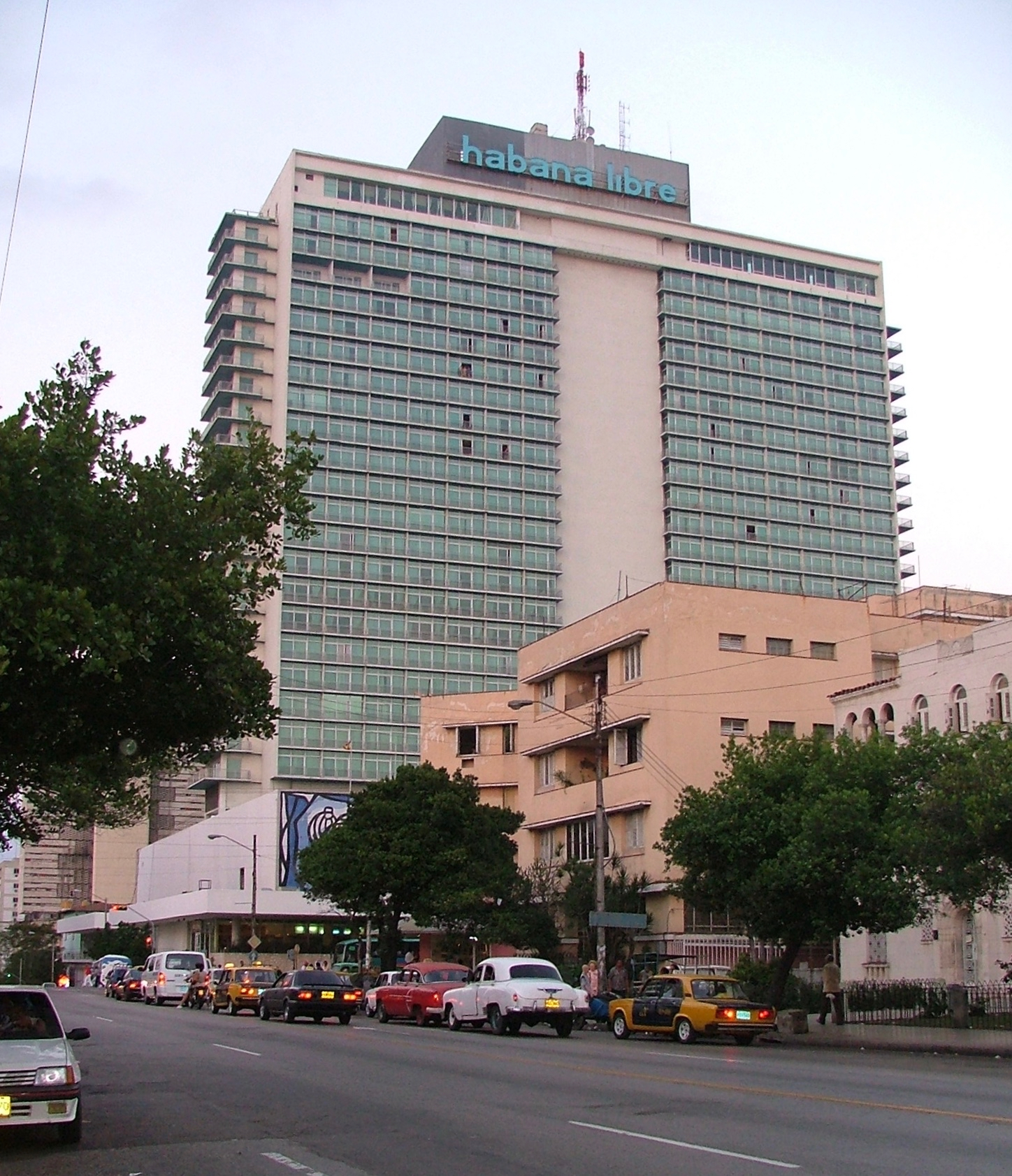
- Hotel Habana Libre

General information
- Location: Havana, Cuba, Calle L e/ 23 y 25, Vedado
- Coordinates: 23°08′21″N 82°22′58″W
- Opening: March 19, 1958
- Owner: Cuban government
- Operator: Gran Caribe

Technical details
- Floor count: 25

Design and construction
- Architect: Welton Becket

Other information
- Number of rooms: 572
- Number of restaurants: 4

The Hotel Habana Libre is one of the larger hotels in Cuba, situated in Vedado, Havana. The hotel has 572 rooms in a 25-floor tower at Calle 23 ("La Rampa") and Calle L. Opened in 1958 as the Habana Hilton, the hotel famously served as the residence of Fidel Castro and other revolutionaries throughout 1959, after their capture of Havana.

== History ==
=== Design and construction ===
The Habana Hilton was constructed at a cost of $24 million, under the personal auspices of President Fulgencio Batista. It was built as an investment by the Caja de Retiro y Asistencia Social de los Trabajadores Gastronómicos, the pension plan of the Cuban catering workers' union, with additional financing from the Banco de Fomento Agrícola e Industrial de Cuba (BANFAIC). It was operated by the American Hilton Hotels International group and was designed by the well-known Los Angeles architect Welton Becket, who had previously designed the Beverly Hilton for the chain. Becket designed the 27-story Habana Hilton in collaboration with Havana-based architects Lin Arroyo and Gabriela Menéndez. Arroyo was the Minister of Public Works under Batista. The hotel was constructed by the Frederick Snare Corporation.

The architectural historian Peter Moruzzi, author of Havana Before Castro, notes what the Hilton meant to Batista:

“Batista considered the Habana Hilton among his proudest achievements, its huge blue-lit rooftop ‘Hilton’ name announcing to the world that the eminent Conrad Hilton had confidence in Cuba’s future – that the country was a safe place in which to invest – and that tourists could now find in Havana the modern comforts they expected in a top international resort.”

=== Grand opening ===
When it was completed, the Habana Hilton was Latin America's tallest and largest hotel. It boasted 630 guest rooms, including 42 suites; an elegant casino; six restaurants and bars, including a Trader Vic's and a rooftop bar; a huge supper club; extensive convention facilities; a shopping arcade; an outdoor pool surrounded by cabanas; and two underground garages with a capacity of 500 cars. The hotel also featured artwork commissioned from some of the most important Cuban modern artists of the day, including an enormous mosaic mural by Amelia Peláez over the main entrance and a tiled wall mural by René Portocarrero in the second-floor Antilles Bar overlooking the pool terrace.

The Habana Hilton opened with five days of festivities, from March 19–23, 1958, with Conrad Hilton himself in attendance, accompanied by actress Ann Miller, who regularly traveled the world with him for the grand openings of his hotels. Hilton was joined by 300 invited guests, including socialite Virginia Warren, daughter of Chief Justice Earl Warren; renowned Hollywood columnist Hedda Hopper; actress Terry Moore; actress Dorothy Johnson; married radio hosts Tex McCrary and Jinx Falkenburg; actress Linda Cristal; dancer Vera-Ellen; actor Don Murray; actress Dolores Hart; ABC network President Leonard Goldenson; and journalist Leonard Lyons. A formal blessing ceremony was held in the hotel's lobby on March 22, 1958, attended by Cuba's First Lady, Marta Fernandez de Batista; Francisco Aguirre, head of the catering workers' union; José Suárez Rivas, Minister of Labor; and other dignitaries. The ceremony was followed by a luncheon, with speeches by Hilton and Aguirre, and a huge gala dinner and ball in the hotel's grand ballroom.

=== Casino ===
The casino in the hotel was leased for $1 million a year to a group consisting of Roberto "Chiri" Mendoza, his brother Mario Mendoza, Clifford "Big Juice" Jones, Kenneth F. Johnson, and Sidney Orseck. Roberto Mendoza was a wealthy Cuban contractor and sugar planter who was a business associate of President Batista; Mario Mendoza was a lawyer; Orseck was an attorney from New York; Johnson was a senator in the Nevada state legislature and Jones was a former lieutenant governor of Nevada who had ownership interests in a number of Las Vegas casinos. Hilton officials said that 13 groups tried to lease the casino and 12 were "turned down because they either had underworld connections or had refused to subject themselves to rigid investigation." Speculation surfaced that the murder of Gambino crime family boss Albert Anastasia in October 1957 was tied to his interest in securing an ownership stake in the Hilton's casino. Roberto Mendoza and Santo Trafficante Jr., who had substantial gambling interests in Cuba, were both in New York at the time of Anastasia's murder. The police investigation of the murder focused on this theory for a while but later looked at other theories. The murder was never solved.

=== Revolution ===
As a result of growing political unrest in Cuba in the hotel's opening year, Hilton's annual report stated that the previously profitable Hilton Hotels International division "made no contribution to 1958 earnings" due directly to significant financial losses the Habana Hilton experienced.

Following Fidel Castro's entry into Havana on January 8, 1959, the hotel became his headquarters, with Castro residing for three months in the hotel's Continental Suite, room 2324. The casinos throughout the city were briefly closed, but protests by Havana casino workers led to their reopening in February. Castro gave his first press conference in the hotel's ballroom on January 19, 1959 and soon took to giving regular interviews to international journalists in the hotel, famously declaring in the lobby that "If the Americans don’t like what is happening in Cuba, they can land the Marines, and then there will be 200,000 gringos dead."

On June 21, 1959, the revolutionary government temporarily released mob boss Santo Trafficante Jr. from the Triscornia prison camp, under guard, so he could attend the wedding of his daughter Mary Jo in the ballroom of the Habana Hilton.

In October 1959, the Habana Hilton hosted the week-long American Society of Travel Agents annual international convention, which had been scheduled before the Revolution. Castro and other officials attempted to present an image of Cuba as a continued tropical paradise for American tourists, as the country desperately needed the revenue, but growing anti-American political rhetoric was already having an impact on bookings at the increasingly empty hotel.

On New Year's Eve 1959/1960, Castro hosted an elaborate party in the Pavilion ballroom atop the hotel, designed to promote Cuba to Americans. The party was attended by numerous American journalists and celebrities, including boxer Joe Louis, who had been hired by a PR firm to encourage black Americans to visit the island. The efforts proved unsuccessful, and the Hilton's American operators struggled to keep the hotel open. Hilton Hotels International was forbidden under Cuban labor laws from firing any of the hotel's 670 employees, though the Hilton seldom had more than 100 guests. The Revolutionary government was eventually compelled to guarantee a bank loan of 2 million pesos to Hoteles Hilton de Cuba, S.A., the Cuban subsidiary of Hilton Hotels International that operated the hotel, to cover the Habana Hilton's operating expenses, and keep its employees working.

In January 1960, Castro is reported to have survived a dramatic assassination attempt at the hotel. Castro's American mistress, Marita Lorenz, had lived with him in the hotel for much of 1959, before returning to the United States, allegedly after an abortion. In the US, she claims she was approached by agents linked to the US Mafia and the CIA, who gave her Botulinum toxin pills. She smuggled the pills back into Cuba, intending to drop them into Castro's drink, killing him within thirty seconds. Lorenz said she had a change of heart on returning to the hotel, only to then discover that the plan was a failure, as the pills had dissolved in the container of cold cream she had hidden them in. She said that Castro then revealed he knew she was there to kill him, but that he also knew she couldn't go through with it. Afterwards, she claims they had sex in his suite in the hotel, before she returned to the US.

=== Hotel Habana Libre ===
The hotel remained in operation as a Hilton while relations between the US and Cuba worsened, until June 11, 1960, when the Cuban government nationalized the property. On June 15, 1960, Castro announced in a speech to the Restaurant and Hotel Workers Federation that he was renaming the hotel the Hotel Habana Libre (Hotel Free Havana). That year, Hilton Hotels International, Inc. wrote off $1,854,575 that had been invested in the Cuban subsidiary that operated the hotel. The first Soviet embassy in Havana was soon temporarily established on two floors of the hotel.

In March 1963, Castro is reputed to have survived another assassination attempt at the hotel, by the US Mafia and the CIA. Cuban intelligence chief Fabian Escalante claimed that a poison pill was to have been slipped into one of the chocolate milkshakes Castro regularly ordered in the hotel's cafeteria, and that Castro was saved only because the pill became stuck to the hotel's kitchen freezer that it was hidden in, and that the pill broke open as the would-be assassin tried to remove it from the ice. Escalante called it "the closest the CIA got to assassinating Fidel."

In 1964, Soviet female cosmonaut Valentina Tereshkova, the first woman in space, gave a press conference at the hotel. From January 3–12, 1966, the Habana Libre hosted the first Tricontinental Conference of Asian, African and Latin-American peoples. Fidel Castro stayed in the hotel's Castellana Suite, room 2224, during the conference, and made the suite his home thereafter for all major diplomatic events. The suite is now kept as a museum, with all the original furniture and artwork from 1958. From October 23 to November 20, 1966, the Habana Libre hosted the 17th Chess Olympiad, with guests including Bobby Fischer and Boris Spassky. In 1967, the hotel hosted Marxist Chilean politician Salvador Allende.

Following the collapse of the Soviet Union, the Cuban government focused on rebuilding the tourism industry. In 1993, they brought in the Spanish Guitart Hotels chain to manage the property as the Hotel Habana Libre Guitart. Then, in 1996 the Spanish Sol Meliá chain assumed management of the hotel from Guitart. It was placed in their Tryp division of urban hotels and renamed Hotel Tryp Habana Libre. The hotel was extensively renovated between 1996 and 1997. Much of the interior was gutted and modernized. The guest rooms were remodeled, with the balconies all glassed in, except those of the historic Castellana Suite. The supper club on the second floor was converted to a buffet restaurant. Among the highlights of the work was the restoration of the huge Peláez mural on the exterior, which had spent decades hidden from public view. The hotel reopened on December 22, 1997, with a speech by Eusebio Leal, who spearheaded the restoration and conservation of the historic district of Old Havana.

In January 1998, the hotel served as the international media headquarters for the Papal visit to Cuba by Pope John Paul II. Journalists including Peter Jennings, Dan Rather, Ted Koppel, Tom Brokaw and Christiane Amanpour reported from and were housed at the hotel. CNN's Ted Turner and his wife, actress Jane Fonda, also visited the hotel at the time.

On February 4, 2013, French daredevil Alain Robert, known as The French Spider-Man, climbed the hotel without ropes or a safety net, as is his custom, watched by hundreds of onlookers.

Meliá Hotels International ceased operating the hotel on July 24, 2026, when the company pulled out of all operations in Cuba.

== Gallery ==
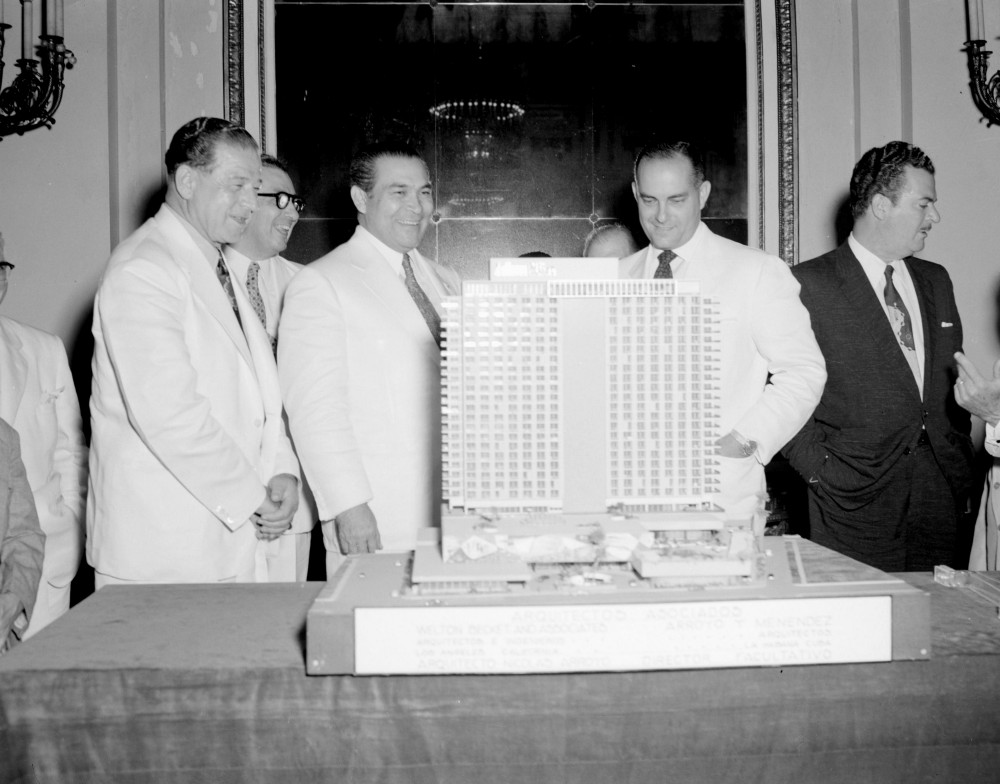
Fulgencio Batista with an architectural model of the Habana Hilton, c. 1956

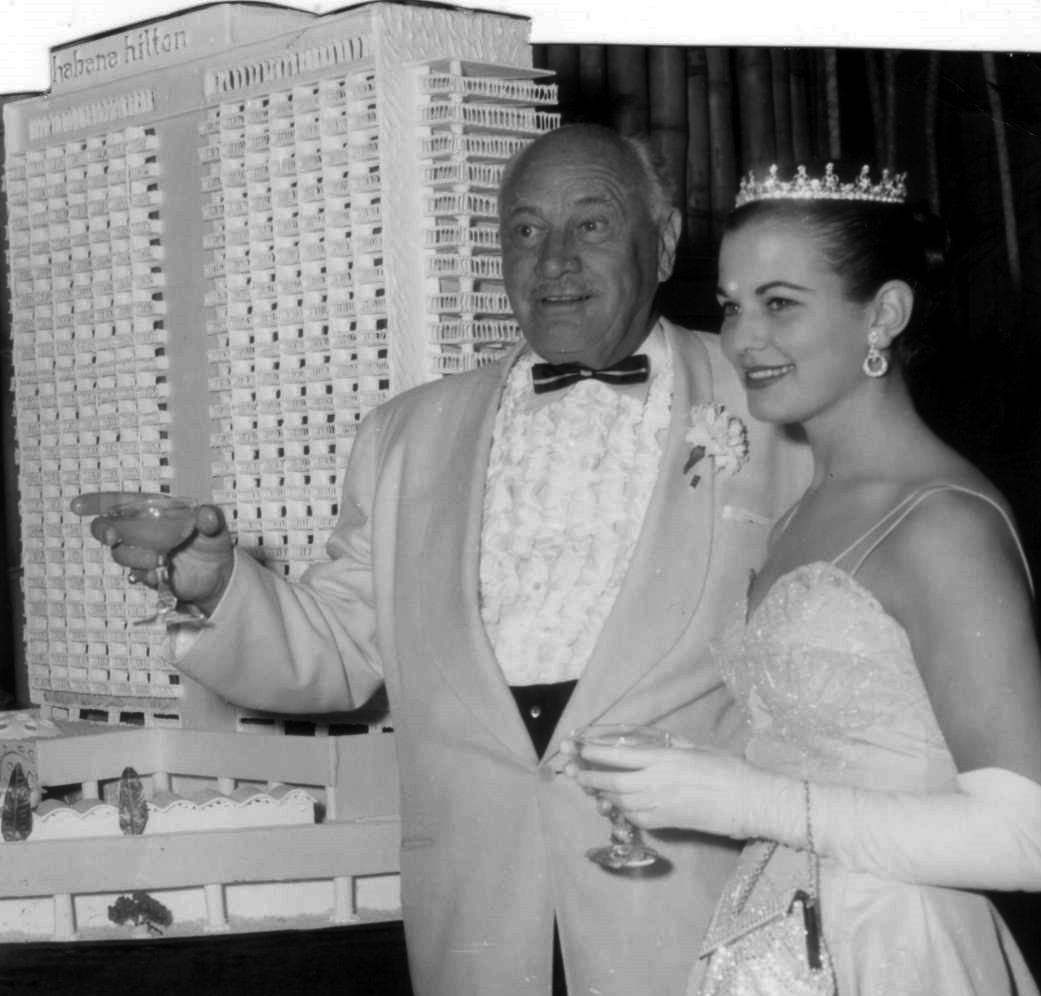
Conrad Hilton and actress Dorothy Johnson attend the grand opening, March 23, 1958
