= The Littlest Hobo (film) =

- Theatrical release poster
- Directed by: Charles R. Rondeau
- Written by: Dorrell McGowan
- Produced by: Hugh M. Hooker
- Starring: London; Fleecie; Buddy Joe Hooker; Wendy Stuart; Carlyle Mitchell; Howard Hoffman; Bob Kline; Pat Bradley; Bill Coontz; Dorothy Johnson; William E. Marks; Pauline Moore; Larry Thor; Norman Bartold
- Cinematography: Perry Finnerman; Walter Strenge
- Edited by: Howard Epstein; Arthur H. Nadel
- Music by: Ronald Stein
- Distributed by: Allied Artists
- Release date: July 6, 1958 (United States)
- Running time: 77 minutes
- Country: United States
- Language: English

The Littlest Hobo is a 1958 American film directed by Charles R. Rondeau. The film stars London, a dog owned and trained by Chuck Eisenmann, in his acting debut, playing as a stray German Shepherd. It was the debut production of Hugh M. Hooker, as well as Rondeau's debut production. Filming took place around Bryce Canyon in Utah. The film featured the song Road Without End, sung by Randy Sparks. It was released by Allied Artists Pictures, and would later become adapted into a Canadian television series in 1963.

== Premise ==
Hobo, a homeless German Shepherd, arrives at an unfamiliar town after leaving a freight train. He comes across a lamb and rescues it from being killed at a slaughterhouse, and is later tasked with restoring happiness to a boy and girl.

== Cast ==
- London as himself (the dog)
- Fleecie as the lamb
- Buddy Joe Hooker as Tommy
- Wendy Stuart as Molly
- Carlyle Mitchell as Governor Malloy
- Howard Hoffman as captain in mission
- Bob Kline as Mike
- Pat Bradley as Joe
- Bill Coontz as attendant
- Dorothy Johnson as Sister Ophelia
- William E. Marks as Dr. Hunt
- Pauline Moore as nurse
- Larry Thor as police captain
- Norman Bartold as police sergeant

== Reception ==
The film received 3.5/5 stars by Wanda Hale of the New York Daily News. According to Rondeau's obituary, he received a Cannes Award in 1958 for directing the film. In March 2024, London was ranked by The Times as the sixth best TV and film dog of all time.
