= Norman Bartold =

American actor (1928–94)

- Bartold in Barney Miller, 1980
- Born: Norman Hillsman Bartold; August 6, 1928; Berkeley, California, U.S.
- Died: May 28, 1994 (aged 65); Rancho Mirage, California, U.S.
- Occupations: Film and television actor
- Spouse: Sheila Bartold

Norman Hillman Bartold (August 6, 1928 – May 28, 1994) was an American film and television actor. He played Mr. Brody in eight episodes of the American television sitcom Teachers Only. He also played the District Attorney Donahue in the short-lived television series Adam's Rib.

== Career ==
Bartold appeared in numerous television programs including The Streets of San Francisco, Benson, The Mary Tyler Moore Show, Fantasy Island, Too Close for Comfort, Charlie's Angels, Perfect Strangers, and Night Court. He also appeared in a few episodes of Laverne & Shirley, Mr. Belvedere, Barney Miller, The Rockford Files, and Falcon Crest. Bartold died in May 1994 in Rancho Mirage, California, at the age of 65.

== Filmography ==
=== Film ===
Year	Title	Role	Notes
1952	She's Working Her Way Through College	'Tiny' Gordon	
1956	The Ten Commandments	Signalman	uncredited
1958	The Littlest Hobo	Police Sergeant	
1967	Riot on Sunset Strip	1st Deputy	
1967	The Busy Body	Board Member	
1971	Will to Die	Tom Drake	
1972	Something Evil	Mr. Hackett	TV movie
1972	Lady Sings the Blues	The Detective No. 1	
1973	Group Marriage	Findley	
1973	Superchick	Old Policeman	
1973	Westworld	Medieval Knight	
1973	Breezy	Man in Car	
1973	Alvin the Magnificent		TV movie
1974	The California Kid	Howard	TV movie
1975	The Sky's the Limit	Captain Willoughby	
1975	Summer School Teachers	Agwin	
1975	Darktown Strutters	Commander Cross	
1976	Moving Violation	Attorney General	
1977	Panic in Echo Dark	Harold Dickerson	TV movie
1977	A Love Affair: The Eleanor and Lou Gehrig Story	Harry Grabiner	TV movie
1977	Close Encounters of the Third Kind	Ohio Tolls	
1977	Capricorn One	President	
1978	Battered		TV movie
1978	Secret of Three Hungry Wives	Durrell	TV movie
1978	Rescue from Gilligan's Island	Producer	TV movie
1978	Suddenly, Love		TV movie
1979	Real Life	Dr. Isaac Steven Hayward	
1979	Friendly Fire		TV movie
1980	Raise the Titanic	Admiral Kemper	
1980	In God We Tru$t		
1981	Madame X	Judge Tom Matlock	TV movie

=== Television ===
Year	Title	Role	Notes
1954	Public Defender	Cop	1 episode
1954	Death Valley Days	Judge James Locke	1 episode
1955	I Led 3 Lives	Comrade 'Peter Carp'	1 episode
1955	The Whistler		1 episode
1955	Front Row Center		1 episode
1956–1957	Dragnet	Barney Swanson	2 episodes
1956	Cavalcade of America	2nd G.I.	1 episode
1957	Alfred Hitchcock Presents	Police Sergeant	Season 2 Episode 16: "Nightmare in 4-D"
1957	Navy Log	Medic	1 episode
1957	The Silent Service	Quartermaster/Rauch	2 episodes
1957	Code 3	Wills	1 episode
1958	Whirlybirds	Harry Rudley	1 episode
1958	Target		1 episode
1966	My Favorite Martian	2nd Policeman	1 episode
1966	The Rounders	Dan Manners	1 episode
1972	Me and the Chimp	Hancock	1 episode
1972–1973	Gunsmoke	Darga/Sheriff	2 episodes
1972	The Mod Squad	Mr. Gorman	1 episode
1973	The New Temperatures Rising Show		1 episode
1973	Adam's Rib	District Attorney Donahue	13 episodes
1974–1975	The Magical World of Disney	Sam Preston/Captain Willoughby	4 episodes
1974–1977	The Rockford Files	Hollis Cotton/Evans/Judge W.T. Carroll	3 episodes
1974	Maude	Executive	1 episode
1974	Rhoda	Maitre d'	1 episode
1975	Emergency!	Harry	1 episode
1975	The Streets of San Francisco	Dr. Eliofson	1 episode
1975	The Mary Tyler Moore Show	Alan Marsh	1 episode
1976	Switch	Perry Curtis	1 episode
1977	Delvecchio	Angelo Musto	1 episode
1977–1982	Barney Miller	Roy Jenkins/Jack Corwin/Bob Schuyler/Carl Bernie/Gordon Wendell	5 episodes
1977–1981	Charlie's Angels	Mr. Platt/Edward Tustin	1 episode
1977	Lou Grant	Commander Phillips	1 episode
1977	Visions	Walter Beck	1 episode
1978	Fish	Kellerman	1 episode
1978	Dallas	Mr. Evans	1 episode
1978	Fantasy Island	Gordon Ross	1 episode
1979	The Dukes of Hazzard	Company Man	1 episode
1979–1982	Benson	Mr. Nettleson/Taylor	2 episodes
1980–1982	Laverne & Shirley	Mr. Hildebrand	4 episodes
1981	Private Benjamin	Colonel	1 episode
1981	Too Close for Comfort	Philip Kadinsky	1 episode
1982	Teachers Only	Mr. Brody	8 episodes
1982	T.J. Hooker	Mayor	1 episode
1983	Filthy Rich	Dr. Bronson	1 episode
1985	Falcon Crest	Judge Jay Holder	4 episodes
1986–1990	Mr. Belvedere	Hotel Clerk/Skip Hollings	7 episodes
1986	Highway to Heaven	Jed Stone	1 episode
1987	Night Court	Mr. Reynolds	1 episode
1987	Rags to Riches		1 episode
1987	Perfect Strangers	Mr.'Bobo' Endicott	1 episode
1990	L.A. Law	Supreme Court Judge Connolly	1 episode
1990	Gabriel's Fire	Petroni	1 episode
