= Life Begins at 17 =

1958 film

- Elaine Peck (Dorothy Johnson) and boyfriend Jim Parker (Edd Byrnes)
- Directed by: Arthur Dreifuss
- Written by: Richard Baer
- Produced by: Sam Katzman
- Starring: Mark Damon; Dorothy Johnson; Luana Anders; Edd Byrnes
- Cinematography: Fred Jackman, Jr.
- Edited by: Saul A. Goodkind
- Production company: Columbia Pictures
- Release dates: July 1958 (United States); August 16, 1958 (Los Angeles)
- Running time: 74 minutes
- Country: US
- Language: English

Life Begins at 17 is a 1958 American drama film starring Dorothy Johnson, Mark Damon, Edd Byrnes and Luana Anders.

== Plot ==
Carol Peck, a 17-year-old from Indiana, has an older sister, Elaine, who is a beauty queen. Carol wins a local pageant, to the delight of her parents Virginia and Harry and her dependable, mild-mannered boyfriend, Jim.

A smug, prep-school boy, Russ Lippincott, openly declares during the beauty contest his intention to date the winner. Elaine is intrigued, but declines. Russ is determined to make a conquest, so he uses her little sister Carol, pretending to be interested in her instead. Elaine wins the title of Miss Indianapolis, then takes up with Russ, insisting he tell Carol the truth.

A misunderstanding leads to a false assumption that Russ and Carol have been intimate, compounded by a broken-hearted Carol claiming she is pregnant. Russ is threatened with expulsion from school and possible arrest for sex with a minor. When she confesses her lie, Carol wins newfound respect from Russ, who becomes genuinely interested in her while Elaine returns to Jim.

== Cast ==
- Dorothy Johnson as Elaine Peck
- Mark Damon as Russ Lippincott
- Edd Byrnes as Jim Parker
- Luana Anders as Carol Peck
- Ann Doran as Virginia Peck
- Hugh Sanders as Harry Peck

== Production ==
It was known as The Teenage Story during production.
