= Charles R. Rondeau =

American television director

- Born: July 14, 1917; Worcester, Massachusetts, U.S.
- Died: August 27, 1996 (aged 79); Carson City, Nevada, U.S.
- Occupation: Television director
- Years active: 1958–1980
- Children: 2

Charles R. Rondeau (July 14, 1917 – August 27, 1996) was an American television director.

Rondeau was born in Worcester, Massachusetts, the son of Mable Robertson and Charles D. Rondeau. Rondeau served in the United States Army. He made his debut as a director in the 1958 film The Littlest Hobo. Rondeau's directing includes, Gunsmoke, Bonanza, The Man from U.N.C.L.E., F Troop, 77 Sunset Strip, Mission: Impossible, Perry Mason, Baretta, The Wild Wild West, Get Smart, Rawhide, The Virginian, Voyage to the Bottom of the Sea, Mannix, The Odd Couple (2 episodes) and Hawaiian Eye.

Rondeau directed 44 episodes of the anthology comedy television series Love, American Style. He also directed 15 episodes of the comedy drama television series Room 222 and six episodes of the sitcom television series The Partridge Family. Rondeau directed three films. He also directed episodes of the action comedy B. J. and the Bear, and its spin-off The Misadventures of Sheriff Lobo.

Rondeau died in August 1996 in Carson City, Nevada, at the age of 79.
