= Skyway Luggage =

Skyway Luggage Co.
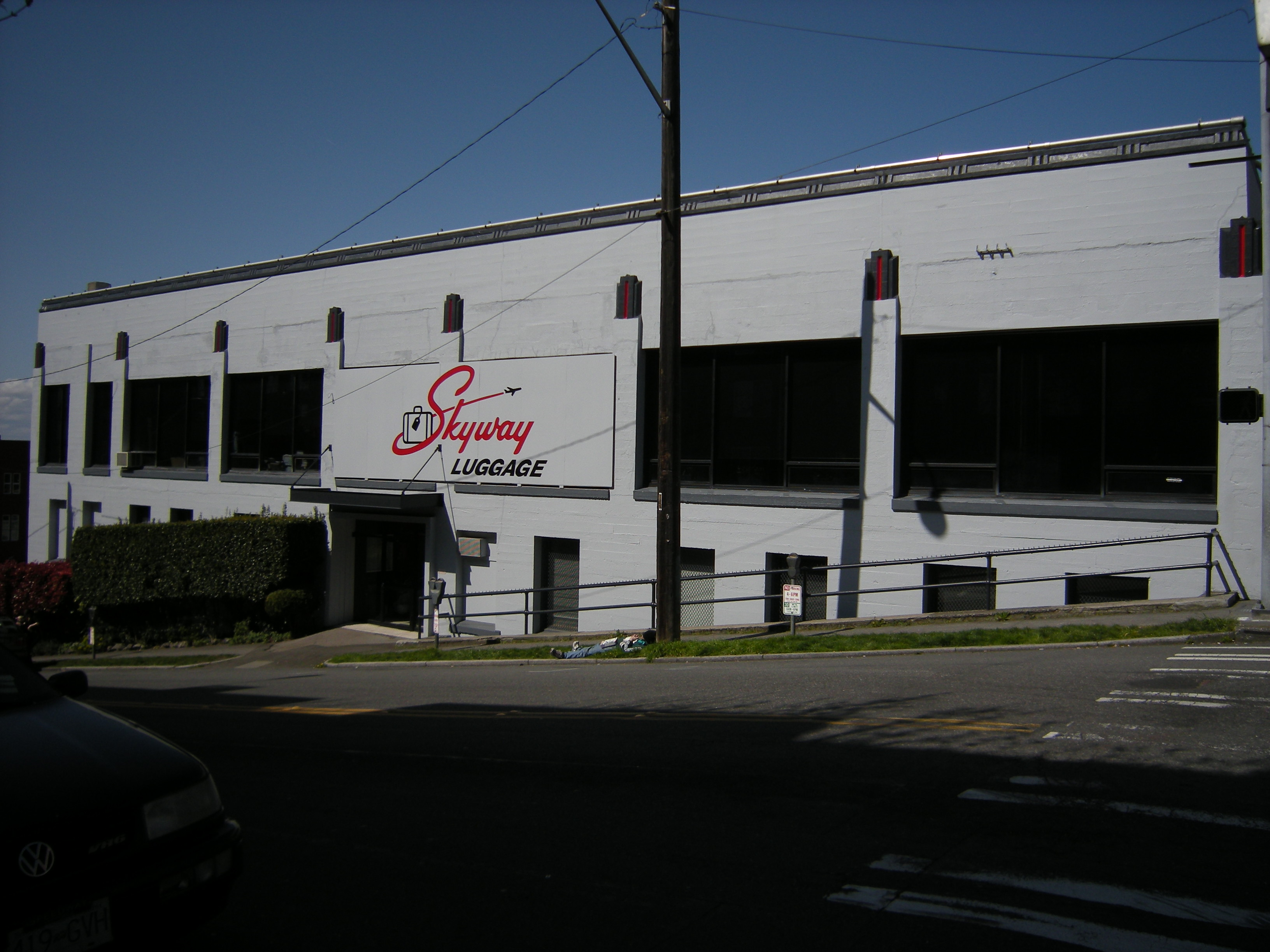
- Skyway Luggage, 74 Wall Street, Seattle (2010)
- Company type: Subsidiary
- Founded: 1910; 115 years ago in Seattle, Washington
- Headquarters: Kent, Washington, United States
- Parent: Ricardo Beverly Hills (from 2012)
- Website: skywayluggage.com

Skyway Luggage Co. is a luggage manufacturer headquartered in Kent, Washington. The company was founded in 1910 and was held privately under the same family until 2012 when it was acquired by Ricardo Beverly Hills. Originally selling in the Pacific Northwest, the company has expanded distribution to include Canada, Mexico, Europe, Australia and New Zealand.

The company was until 2012, the largest independently owned luggage supplier in the United States.

Skyway is known for introducing chrome plated hardware and vinyl luggage coverings in the 1950s and, in 1972, the first commercially successful luggage on wheels in the United States. In 1998 the company transitioned from US manufacturing to 100% offshore production.

In February 2012, Skyway Luggage Company was acquired by Ricardo Beverly Hills, and now operates out of Kent, Washington.
