= Richard Baer (screenwriter) =

American writer and screenwriter

- Born: May 28, 1928
- Died: February 22, 2008 (aged 79)

Richard Baer (April 28, 1928 – February 22, 2008) was an American writer and screenwriter. Baer wrote for more than 56 television shows, many of which were sitcoms, throughout his career, including The Munsters, Leave It to Beaver and Bewitched.

== Early life ==
Richard Baer was born in New York City in 1928. He was the only child of Herbert Baer and Ede Sarnoff. His mother was David Sarnoff's sister. He earned his bachelor's degree in psychology from Yale University and his master's degree in cinema from the University of Southern California.

== Career ==
Baer's maternal uncle was David Sarnoff, a broadcasting pioneer who headed the RCA company. Sarnoff is credited with beginning Baer's career and forming his interest in television. According to Baer's 2005 autobiography, Sarnoff called a vice president at NBC at 6 a.m. and ordered him to find Baer "a job by 9 o'clock" that same morning. The vice president obliged. Baer was hired in 1953 for his first job in television as an assistant for the William Bendix sitcom The Life of Riley, which aired on the NBC network. He later wrote several episodes for the show.

Baer wrote the script for the film Life Begins at 17 for Columbia Pictures in 1958.

Baer began writing for Hennesey, which starred actor Jackie Cooper, in 1960. Baer wrote scripts for a total of 38 episodes for the series. His work on Hennesey earned him an Emmy nomination.

In the twenty five years that followed 1960, Baer wrote for over 56 separate television shows. This included ten episodes of the television classics That Girl, twenty-three of Bewitched, and five of The Munsters. His favorite episode of The Musters which he personally penned was Just Another Pretty Face. In the episode, the character Herman Munster is struck by lightning, which changes his face into that of a normal human being. The Munsters are shocked by how ugly they think Herman has become. His other sitcom credits included The Andy Griffith Show, F Troop and Petticoat Junction.

Baer began working on television movies later in his career. His writing credits included the 1972 ABC comedic television movie Playmates, which starred Alan Alda and Doug McClure as divorced single fathers. The Los Angeles Times called Playmates "spiced with biting wit" in its review of the movie. Baer also wrote the CBS movie I Take These Men, which aired in 1983.

Baer's wrote his last television sitcom script for an episode of ABC's Who's the Boss? in the 1980s. He then successfully tried his hand as a playwright. Baer's Mixed Emotions, a romantic comedy play about two widowed friends who start a romantic relationship during their later years, debuted in 1987. The play first opened in Los Angeles. Baer's play later debuted on Broadway in New York City in 1993 and ran for more than six weeks. Mixed Emotions was later performed in theaters worldwide, including Eastern Europe and Australia.

Baer was an active member of the Writers Guild of America. He served on the WGA's negotiating committee during the 1988 Writers Guild of America strike.

== Personal life ==
Richard Baer died at St. John's Health Center in Santa Monica, California, on February 22, 2008, at the age of 79. He had suffered a heart attack in January 2008. He was survived by his wife, Diane Asselin Baer, a television producer, whom he married in 1994, as well as his children, Josh, Matthew (who married Amy Bosley Baer, daughter of Tom Bosley), and Judy and three grandchildren. His first wife of 35 years, Louise Glenn, died in 1991.
