= 1313 Mockingbird Lane =

- Origin: Albany, New York
- Genres: Garage rock, garage punk
- Years active: 1989–1996
- Labels: Scarab Records (1989–1993); Sundazed Music (1990); Midnight Records (1993); Weed Records (1994)
- Website: Band page on Last.fm

1313 Mockingbird Lane is an American garage rock band whose name was inspired by the fictional address of the Munster Mansion in the 1964–1966 television series The Munsters. The group formed in the late 1980s in Albany, New York, touring extensively, and releasing at least nine different 45 rpm records, LP records, and CD recordings. The band had a full-page narrative dedicated to them in Timothy Gassen's book The Knights of Fuzz, about the garage rock and psychedelic music phenomenon of 1980–1995. Of thousands of bands covered in the book, Gassen listed 1313 Mockingbird Lane on his "all time Hot 100" list, which also included The Chesterfield Kings and the Flamin' Groovies.

== History ==
The music of 1313 Mockingbird Lane was said to keep to the basics of fuzz guitar, Farfisa organ, and screaming. The original line-up featured Haunted Hausmann (guitar, vocals), Kim13 (organ), Jay "Robin Graves" Howlett (bass, vocals), and Steve E. Luv (drums). The first of several "must have 45s" was a debut single produced on Scarab Records in 1989, titled Hornets Nest b/w My Hearse Is Double Parked. With later songs like "Dig Her Up" and an anti-Beatles tune called "I Don't Wanna Hold Your Hand", the prominent lyrical themes of gloom and doom presented by the band were combined with a healthy dose of tongue-in-cheek garage humor.

Drummer Steve E. Luv quickly departed and was replaced by former Link Wray Live In '85 drummer Marty Feier. The band's second release, the four-song EP The Second Coming Of 1313 Mockingbird Lane (Scarab Records 1989) was voted by both Schenectady Gazette and Albany's Metroland as one of the "top local recordings of 1989" and was distributed internationally.

Shortly after the release of that EP, the band signed with Sundazed Music. Sundazed Music releases rare and previously unreleased tracks by different garage rock and surf music bands including The Knickerbockers and The Five Americans. The band's first full-length LP Have Hearse Will Travel was released by Sundazed in 1990. The vinyl was pressed in a distinct slime green color. The liner notes for the 13-song album were written by Blotto lead singer, Sergeant Blotto.

From this point, the band line-up changed again with the eventual departure of both bassist Robin Graves and drummer Marty Feier, who was replaced by Rusty "Krusty" Nales, then by drummer OP, and replaced again by Dave Pollack. As organist Kim commented, "We go through more drummers than Spinal Tap". Feier departed the band for a full-time touring gig in The Cast of Beatlemania, which starred members of the Broadway show Beatlemania. 1313 Mockingbird Lane would perform multiple double bills with Boston-based garage rock legends, Lyres. In early 1994, the band caught some media attention by issuing a simultaneous triple release of their new recordings. In September 1994, Brian Goodman of Rochester, New York band The Projectiles replaced drummer Dave Pollack for the final two singles, released in 1996.

The band split up in 1996, playing the last show at Pauly's Hotel in their hometown of Albany. That night, Susan Yasinski from Susan and the Surftones was in the crowd and recruited Brian Goodman to join her band, with Kim13 soon to follow.

The band recently successfully completed a PledgeMusic campaign which resulted in the April 2015 Cacaphone Records re-release of the debut LP on vinyl, CD, and cassette, remastered with bonus tracks.

== Discography ==
=== 45 vinyl singles ===
- "Hornet's Nest/My Hearse (Is Double Parked)",1989 Scarab Records #S-001
- "Monkey Cage Girl/Pretty Boys", 1991 Scarab Records #S-004
- "Psychedelic Monster/Dead Mary", 1991 Scarab Records #S-005
- "Slow Death/Dirty Bitch", 1993 Scarab Records #S-006
- "Alice Dee/Spider and The Fly", 1994 Weed Records Weed 011 France
- "Devil's Weed(Haunted Hausmann)/Tamala (Searchin' For...)" (written by Brian Goodman while he was in The Projectiles), 1995 Screaming Apple Records SCAP No. 034 Germany
- "Naked (And Waiting)/Backwash Beach", 1995 Cacophone Records, CPR 45003
- "Problems/Drambuie", 1996 Cacophone Records, CPR 45005

=== Vinyl EPs ===
- The Second Coming Of 1313 Mockingbird Lane, 1989 Scarab Records SCARAB-002
- Froot Boots, 1993, Scarab Records #S-007

=== Vinyl LP ===
- Have Hearse Will Travel, 1990 Who's Driving My Plane/Sundazed WD40
- Have Hearse Will Travel, remastered with bonus tracks 2016 Cacaphone Records

=== CD ===
- Triskaidekaphobia, 1993 Midnight Records, MIRCD 152

=== Compilations ===
- What’s All The Fuzz About, cassette, What Wave magazine, ww-07, 1989
- Some Kinda Weirdos In That Cave There!, cassette, Cryptic Tymes magazine, 1993
- Ultra Swank: Cacophone Sound Action Sampler 1999, CD, Cacophone Records, 1999
