= Les Fradkin =

- Origin: New York City, United States
- Genres: Rock, progressive rock, neoclassical, surf rock, instrumental rock, symphonic rock
- Occupations: Musician, Composer, Songwriter, Record Producer
- Years active: 1969–current
- Labels: MGM Records, Sunflower Records, Laurie Records, ESP-Disk, Arista Records & RRO Entertainment
- Website: http://www.lesfradkin.com

Les Fradkin (born 1951) is an American MIDI guitarist, keyboardist, songwriter, composer, and record producer. He is best known for being a member of the original cast of the hit Broadway show Beatlemania. In addition to playing MIDI guitar, he plays 12 string guitar, the Starr Labs Ztar, guitar synthesizer, SynthAxe, Hammond organ, Mellotron, piano, bass guitar, and Moog synthesizer.

== Early years ==
Fradkin was born in New York City and raised in Riverdale in the Bronx. He travelled extensively in Europe, the United Kingdom, and the Caribbean as a youngster. He began his musical education at the age of 10 being taught the basics of classical piano from his mother, a former concert pianist. Inspired by seeing the Beatles on "The Ed Sullivan Show" and hearing "Walk Don't Run '64" by the Ventures on the radio at the age of 13, he began to teach himself guitar. Other music that inspired him ranged from the British Invasion sounds of the day to American rock acts such as the Byrds, the Beach Boys, Bob Dylan, and Frank Zappa. But what most held his interest and fascination was the art of record production. He was particularly interested in how producers such as Les Paul, Joe Meek, and Phil Spector got their sounds and, in 1966, began tape experiments with Sound on Sound with a Panasonic tape recorder he received as a birthday gift. By 1968, he could edit, splice, and overdub complex recordings at home. By 1969, he had written a large portfolio of original pop and rock songs and was proficient on guitar, bass guitar, Hammond organ, and piano. He turned professional that year and signed a staff songwriting contract with April-Blackwood Music, a division of CBS. This situation did not work out to either April's or Fradkin's satisfaction and April Music gave him his release in early 1970.

== The MGM years ==
Fradkin moved over to MGM Records in August 1970 and signed a staff songwriter agreement with Leo Feist Music and a recording contract with the new MGM/Sunflower Records label headed up by songwriting legend Mack David and industry veteran Danny Kessler. Fradkin signed as the first artist for Sunflower Records under the name "Fearless Fradkin", and debuted his first solo single "Song of a Thousand Voices" which was produced by Randy Edelman. Given front-page coverage in Billboard Magazine and picked for the Top 40, "Song of a Thousand Voices" surfaced as a regional hit in September 1970. By October 1970, he co-produced, co-wrote, and sang another Sunflower regional hit single "Hippie Lady" under the pseudonym the Yummies. In early 1971, "Song of a Thousand Voices" was translated into French by Hubert Ithier and recorded by the French songstress Mireille Mathieu as "La Chansons Des Souvenirs" for her "Love Story" Extended Play single on the Philips label. It was also released as a 45 rpm single. Both versions became substantial hits in France, Germany, Austria, Switzerland, and Israel. "Song of a Thousand Voices" has also been covered in a Spanish language hit version "Donde?" by Latin Pop star Roberto Jordan originally released on the RCA Victor label.

== Early sessions ==
By 18 years of age, Fradkin was proficient on many instruments and this led to him finding extensive session work in studios in New York City and London, playing Mellotron, Hammond organ, bass, guitar, and piano.

== The Left Banke sessions ==
In 1972 and 1973, Fradkin produced sessions sponsored by Bell Records for the baroque pop group the Left Banke, famous for their hit "Walk Away Renee". Although left unreleased at the time, one song, "I Could Make It Last Forever", appears on Fradkin's 2006 release Goin' Back. A machima video of the song was produced and directed by Charlemagne Fezza and it appears on YouTube.

== The Laurie Years ==
From 1973 through 1976 and again between 1981 through 1987, Fradkin signed on as a producer and songwriter with Gene Schwartz for the Laurie Records label. Fradkin produced many artists for Laurie including Mara Lynn Brown, Tom Selden, New Hope, Barry Winslow of the Royal Guardsmen, actress Nell Carter, chanteuse Valerie Tyler, pop stylist Barbara M., and a comedian Marty Brill, who released an LP called The Missing Tapes. 22 singles and 4 albums for the Laurie label in all. But the most prolific artist he produced for Laurie and, perhaps, the most notable was the pop rock group, California. Fradkin was an original member/singer/guitarist/keyboardist for the California group on Laurie Records in the US and RCA Records in the UK for its entire existence from 1973 through 1985. California had several chart records including the 1981 release "Summer Fun Medley"-a medley of Beach Boys hits, "Jeans On", "He's Almost You" (charting in the United Kingdom), and an appearance on the Dick Clark American Bandstand television show. And their single cover of "See You in September" saw honorary placement in the famous Laurie collectors series Collector Records of the 50s and 60s - Vol. 14. Fradkin wrote many of the B-sides of California's singles and Steve Martin Caro and George Cameron of the Left Banke were original members of California on the group's early releases.

== The ESP-Disk years ==
By 1973, Fradkin had diversified his producer portfolio and made an agreement to license several of his productions to the Indie label ESP-Disk. His production of "Give a Damn" by Paul Thornton (recorded at A-1 Sound Studios in New York City with Herb Abramson and Jonathan Thayer as co-engineers), saw release on the fourth Godz album Godzundheit, and Fradkin guested as bass player on a solo album by Godz member Jim McCarthy entitled Alien. Steve Martin Caro and George Cameron, both of the Left Banke also participated in these sessions, all recorded at A-1.

1974 saw the debut album on ESP-Disk by Thornton, Fradkin & Unger. The group's other members were Paul Thornton, an original member of the Godz on acoustic guitar and Bob Unger, bassist. Their album was called Pass On This Side and featured cover art consisting of a "do-it-yourself" blank black cover with a die cut sheet of stickers that buyers could arrange any way they pleased. The album received good reviews from Cash Box, Crawdaddy Magazine, and several other publications. A 45 rpm single was released, "God Bless California," which charted in Belgium and The Netherlands. Fradkin played the role of multi-instrumentalist on the sessions with participation on lead vocals, 12-string guitar, Mellotron, Hammond organ, mandolin, and piano. Thornton, Fradkin & Unger toured that summer opening shows for the likes of Roger McGuinn, Brewer & Shipley, Richie Havens, Blood, Sweat & Tears, and Livingston Taylor. Fradkin played 12-string guitar and Mellotron on these shows. The group's largest and most important appearance took place during the summer of 1974 at the Islip Speedway Outdoor Festival. 10,000 fans attended the all-day rock festival. The group disbanded in 1975. Fradkin returned to record production doing several projects for Mercury Records along with his continuing role as a producer for Laurie Records.

== Beatlemania: the Broadway musical ==
In July 1976, Fradkin auditioned for and won the role of George Harrison in Beatlemania, the hit Broadway show of the late 1970s. Beatlemania was a Broadway musical revue focused on the life and music of the Beatles. Advertised as "Not the Beatles, but an Incredible Simulation", it ran from 1977 to 1979 for a total of 1006 performances. The Beatlemania show marked the birth of the "Tribute Band" industry. Fradkin appeared in over 1000 performances as lead guitarist. The show debuted in Boston at the Colonial Theatre in April 1977 and opened for previews on May 26, 1977, at the Winter Garden Theater in New York City. Quickly achieving sellout status without ever having an official "opening night", the Beatlemania band and the musical saw great success and worldwide publicity in Time magazine, People Magazine, Us Magazine, Newsweek, and Rolling Stone Magazine. For the first six months, every ticket for the show was sold out. Fradkin was also featured in performances with Beatlemania at the Lunt-Fontanne Theatre, Palace Theatre in New York City; the Shubert Theatre in Century City, Los Angeles, California and the Pantages Theater in Los Angeles, California; and the Blackstone Theater (now the Merle Reskin Theatre) in Chicago, Illinois. Fradkin performed with the show until its close on October 17, 1979.

== Beatlemania: the album ==
In 1978, Beatlemania released a self-titled soundtrack to the show which included contributions from the first and second cast of performers from the show (as well as a few additional off stage keyboardists and musicians). Released on Arista Records in 1978, the album received warm audience reaction, even placing on the Billboard Hot 100 for several weeks before falling into vinyl obscurity. Tracks from the album included most but not all of the original show's songlist and several of the tracks were either re-recorded entirely or partially re-recorded in the studio. The four original cast members that appear on the album included Mitch Weissman (bass guitar, vocals), Joe Pecorino (rhythm guitar, vocals), Les Fradkin (lead guitar, vocals), and Justin McNeill (drums).

== The 1980s ==
In the early 1980s, Fradkin returned to record production with the Laurie Records label. 1981 saw the release of the California singles "Summer Fun Medley" and 1982's "He's Almost You" which had chart success. By 1983, MIDI, a new interfacing technology for synthesizer was introduced and Fradkin saw new possibilities for his music productions. In 1984, he turned to the jingle and television music industry and guitar synthesis as a new form of musical expression. In 1983, he took up the guitar synthesizer and has been a prime exponent of it ever since. He played the SynthAxe, the Synclavier, and various Roland Corporation GR guitar synthesizers over the years.

He pioneered the introduction of completely MIDI tapeless recording using the Yamaha QX1 digital sequencer and the Synclavier with the SynthAxe MIDI guitar controller and Yamaha DX7 and TX816 synthesizers in soap opera music, and composed and programmed numerous successful jingles and movie soundtracks as well as many game show themes. He worked for Score Productions and ABC in New York City and wrote national jingles for such products as Cheerios, Campbell's Soup, Nestlé, Crisco, and American Express. He was the first composer in New York City to record entirely "direct-to-disk". His sonic innovations at that time with guitar synthesizer and MIDI programming earned him great accolades in the television music industry which soon established him with the nickname "Dr. MIDI".

1985 saw a Sutra Records guitar instrumental 12-inch single released of "In-A-Gadda-Da-Vida". Fradkin recorded this as a duo with synthesist Rob Hegel. The act was called Maddog. 3C Records released the first all-guitar synthesizer album, California-Electric Swing that year with Fradkin as producer, guitar synthesizer performer, and synthesizer programmer.

By 1989, Fradkin had programmed/composed/performed on over 50 national jingles and had 4 years of One Life to Live soap opera music under his belt.

== The 1990s ==
Fradkin spent the 1990s composing new music and doing Beatlemania revival shows, including appearances across the United States, Canada, Iceland, and the Dominican Republic. Most notably, the show, featuring Fradkin in his familiar lead guitarist role, played a successful week-long engagement in 1995 at the Sahara Hotel and Casino in Las Vegas, Nevada. In 1993, ESP-Disk signed a distribution deal with ZYX Music of Merenberg, Germany to reissue its entire catalog. Pass On This Side saw reissue as Godz Bless California with the cover art, artist name, and title changed without the artist's permission. Although this reissue series initially spurred a Godz reunion with Fradkin participating on guitar, the situation deteriorated and the reunion was quite brief with a show at New York's The Bitter End Cafe being the chief highlight for fans. Some new music was recorded during this period and several songs found their way onto later CD releases. By 1996, Fradkin relocated to Redondo Beach, California where the Internet provided a new direction for his musical efforts.

== Trackbytrack Records and Get Wet ==
He turned his focus to Internet download sales at the dawn of the era of Liquid Audio and mp3.com and formed his first independent record company known as Trackbytrack. Once again, Fradkin found himself at the center of the innovation tree as he developed a new take on the hitherto established surf rock guitar sound which proved a great critical and sales success. Releasing a self-produced CD titled Get Wet, tunes such as "Body Surfin'", "Surfin' the Classics, Parts 1 & 2", and "Reverbia" reached mp3.com's #1 position 16 times and garnered over 230,000 downloads. The music showed a blend of several notable influences including the Ventures, Dick Dale, Jeff Beck, and various classical music influences including J.S. Bach, Mozart, and Paganini. In 2001, a follow-up CD A Day at the Beach was released and had further success with three titles ("A Day at the Beach", "Hurricane Warning", and "The Bridge Across Forever") making the #1 slot on mp3.com. Fradkin also made a short lived licensing deal with Renaissance Records to issue a CD entitled Paul Thornton & Les Fradkin – Godzology which featured archival unreleased material from past years from Thornton & Fradkin.

== RRO Entertainment ==
In 2000, Fradkin relocated to Parker, Colorado and married. In 2003, he and his wife Loretta started a new recording and music publishing company called "RRO Entertainment" and Fradkin 2000 Music. The first release on the new indie label was Reality - The Rock Opera, a Les Fradkin solo CD. Fradkin expanded his multi-instrumentalist concept and became a one-man virtual orchestra on this release playing 12-string guitar, 6-string guitar, bass guitar, Hammond organ, piano, Mellotron, and guitar synthesizer. This was quickly followed by the reissue of the two Get Wet CDs repackaged and remastered for 24-bit fidelity. The two CDs were now titled: Les Fradkin & Get Wet – Splash! and Les Fradkin & Get Wet – A Day at the Beach. Critical acclaim and sales quickly followed these releases. Robert Silverstein wrote liner notes to both CDs and 20th Century Guitar Magazine ran a feature article on Fradkin. In the U.K., "New" Gandy Dancer instrumental rock magazine named A Day at the Beach its 2004 Album of the Year.

== With the Ventures ==
This brought Fradkin to the attention of Nokie Edwards, lead guitarist of the Ventures, during LouieFest in summer 2004 in Tacoma, Washington. Edwards brought Fradkin to the attention of the Ventures who quickly signed him to an endorsement agreement with their new Wilson Bros. Ventures guitar line. In addition, Fradkin performed live with the Ventures as second lead guitarist at the Salmon Days Festival in Issaquah, Washington in October, 2004. Nokie Edwards also recorded with Fradkin on several occasions and was a featured guest on his While My Guitar Only Plays CD.

== The Internet Download Years ==
RRO Entertainment entered the music marketplace during a time of declining compact disc sales in the music industry in general. Fradkin decided to concentrate on the burgeoning download market through distribution with CD Baby and this strategy paid off handsomely. By 2009, Fradkin had released 31 albums on his RRO Entertainment label, 20 of them as solo CDs – all titles available through worldwide download outlets such as Apple iTunes, Napster, Rhapsody, and many others. Many singles from these CDs became popular Apple iTunes downloads. Some of the singles, (featuring Fradkin on vocals, guitar, guitar synthesizer, and Mellotron), including "Love Grows (Where My Rosemary Goes)", "My Baby Loves Lovin'", "While My Guitar Gently Weeps" (done as a melodramatic guitar instrumental), "My Sweet Lord" (a cover of the George Harrison smash hit featuring Richie Furay on background vocals and acoustic guitar), "Have I the Right" (a cover of the Honeycombs hit), and "You Were On My Mind" (a cover of the famous hit by We Five) became popular sellers on Apple's download service.

Fradkin's 2006 CD If Your Memory Serves You Well (a tribute to Bob Dylan) also scored with fans and his cover of "Quinn the Eskimo (The Mighty Quinn)" a/k/a "The Mighty Quinn" sold well and received great critical acclaim. In particular, Fradkin exploited the absence of the Beatles catalog on iTunes and released several successful download CDs of Beatles guitar instrumental rock (While My Guitar Only Plays featuring Nokie Edwards of the Ventures, Pepper Front to Back, The White Single, and Guitar Revolution) as well as two CDs of his vocal tribute to George Harrison's solo and Beatles material – Something for George and Love You 2. Those sold especially well and established Fradkin as a prime exponent of Beatles cover material in the modern era.

In the surf rock market, Fradkin's two Get Wet reissues scored well with "Apache" and "Good Vibrations" seeing success. His 2006 production of "They're Coming to Take Me Away, Ha-Haaa!" by Napoleon's Ghost rocked the iTunes charts and brought RRO Entertainment a bona fide download hit single. He even recreated the backwards B-side "!aaaH-aH ,yawA eM ekaT oT gnimoC er'yehT."

Other artists on RRO included Venus In Bluejeans, Edison Lighthouse, the Dirt Surfers, and a four volume tribute to the Byrds entitled "Timeless Flyte" with extensive liner notes by noted Byrds historian John Einarson and rock critic Eric Sorensen. Some of the artists on the "Timeless Flyte" project included Andrew Gold, Bill Lloyd, Jeffrey Foskett, the Kennedys, the Shambles, Walter Egan, Alice Stuart, Bob Harris, Bedsit Poets, Bill Kaffenberger, the Dixie Bee-Liners, and Tony Poole of Starry Eyed and Laughing. In 2008, he licensed the download rights for the CD Colorado to Liverpool - A Tribute To The Beatles, from Firefall, stars of country rock.

In October 2008, RRO Entertainment released a YouTube video of his song "Everything Is Wrong" from his Reality - The Rock Opera CD. The financial crisis of America which was prophetically depicted in the lyric of "Everything Is Wrong" back in 2003, quickly found a worldwide audience of empathy and drove the download single of "Everything Is Wrong" to the top of Fradkin's best seller Apple iTunes list.

In May 2009, Fradkin released his second album featuring Starr Labs' Ztar entitled Baroque Rocks!, taking Baroque works by Handel, Bach, and Antonio Vivaldi (including The Four Seasons) and applying rock treatments; Fradkin's classical influence came most fully to the fore with this release. Baroque Rocks! also featured a cover version for Ztar of the Mason Williams instrumental "Classical Gas" on which Fradkin performed the entire arrangement on the Starr Labs Ztar and guitar synthesizer. This CD also features Fradkin's brand new arrangement for "Canon in D". Fradkin performed the entire arrangement on the Starr Labs Ztar, which consists of a brand new melodic composition over the original classical orchestral parts to yield a brand new work.

== Technique and equipment ==
Fradkin uses a combination of compression, chorus, delay, and reverb for his guitar sound.

He generally records his guitar parts in stereo, often using a VG-8 Virtual Guitar System by Roland Corporation in addition to the guitar's regular output signal. His main guitars for recording and performance work are the Fender Stratocaster, Fender Jaguar, and Wilson Bros. Ventures guitars which are new Don Wilson designed variants of the Mosrite guitars that the Ventures endorsed in the 1960s. He favors a Rickenbacker 360/12 12-string electric for jangly tones. His use of Rickenbacker 12-string is especially prominent in his stint with Beatlemania as well as some of his solo CD releases such as Jangleholic, Spirit of Christmas, If Your Memory Serves You Well, Goin' Back, and 12.

His guitar parts are always recorded direct with amp simulators to keep noise to an absolute minimum and are usually double tracked. His guitar effects include the Janglebox, Joe Meek compressor, and Vox Tonelab. To construct his backing tracks, on which he usually plays all the instruments, he uses a Starr Labs Ztar Z7s to control various MIDI synthesizers, the GForce M-Tron (a software instrument representation of a Mellotron), the Vienna Symphonic Library, and drums. He handles bass parts with a Rickenbacker bass, a 12 String Bass, as well as the Ztar.

His production style is chiefly characterized by generous amounts of compression, loud recording levels, and a dense sonic arrangement wall which many have compared favorably with the likes of Joe Meek and Phil Spector. Although he always records digitally with Digital Performer, Ableton Live, Apple Logic Pro, and the Roland Corporation VSR-880, his sound is quite reminiscent of the warmth embodied in 1960s analog recording technique.

In 2007, he acquired a Starr Labs Ztar which revealed new possibilities for his guitar synthesizer technique with his 2008 releases of his popular cover of the Tornados' "Telstar" and his 2008 full-length CD One Link Between Them. Fradkin now has the ability to offer melody, rhythm, bass, looping, percussion, and Ableton Live clip cueing all live under his hands with the Ztar, making him, effectively, an electronic music One Man Band.
