= Marty Feier =

American drummer and music producer

- Birth name: Martin Feierstein
- Born: July 12, 1962 (age 63); New York, NY
- Genres: garage rock, punk rock, rock and roll, jazz
- Occupation(s): Musician, songwriter, producer
- Instrument(s): Drums, percussion
- Years active: 1978–present
- Labels: Scarab Records, Slinky Records, Sundazed Music

Marty Feier is an American drummer and music producer. He is best known for his musician/producer role with 1313 Mockingbird Lane and for his work backing guitar pioneer Link Wray. He also portrayed Ringo Starr while touring worldwide with The Cast of Beatlemania.

== Career ==
Marty Feier's career has spanned a diverse set of musical experiences and collaboration.

=== The Seclusions with Marty Feier, Busta Jones, and others ===
The Seclusions was a collaboration among Feier, Randy "Dash" Hoving, and Busta Jones Although occasionally playing live, The Seclusions were more intended to be a studio project, recruiting a number of key players in the New York scene, including Jimmy Destri, Joey Ramone, Jimmy Ripp, and Jay Dee Daugherty.

=== Link Wray ===
Feier entered the public eye as the percussionist backing Link Wray on his albums Live in '85 (January 1986) and Born To Be Wild (1989), filling the spot vacated by Anton Fig.

=== Revolver ===
Revolver was Feier's next project to release recorded tracks, an indie band formed in 1985. Revolver's Scratch & Dent EP was released by Slinky Records, having been produced by Feier and engineered by Joe Blaney, who had done the same for The Clash's double platinum Combat Rock. The album featured five original songs and a cover of "Gimme Gimme Good Lovin'", originally released by Crazy Elephant in the late 1960s.

=== 1313 Mockingbird Lane ===
An Albany, New York garage rock band with a name inspired by The Munsters television mansion address, 1313 Mockingbird Lane's drummer Steve E. Luv departed and was replaced by Marty Feier. Feier soon added production to his role in the band's recordings. Their second release, The Second Coming Of 1313 Mockingbird Lane (Scarab Records, 1989) was voted by regional news publications as one of the "top local recordings of 1989". They would go on to release a full-length album together, Have Hearse Will Travel, in 1990 on Sundazed Music.

The band recently successfully completed a PledgeMusic campaign which resulted in the April 2015 Cacaphone Records re-release of the debut LP on vinyl, CD, and cassette, remastered with bonus tracks.

=== The Cast of Beatlemania ===
Feier departed 1313 Mockingbird Lane for a full-time touring gig with The Cast of Beatlemania, which starred members of the successful Broadway show, Beatlemania. The press noted that they weren't great lookalikes, but that they faithfully reproduced the sound and feel of The Beatles. For these live performances, Feier portrayed Ringo Starr by donning a mop-top wig and playing a 1965 Ludwig Black Oyster drum kit.

=== Still Got That Hunger ===
In 2015, Feier was the executive producer of the album Still Got That Hunger by the band The Zombies. It was the band's first album since June 1969 to break into various Billboard top album charts.

=== Discography ===
Release date	Title	Label	Number
1986 UK	Live in '85 (Link Wray)	Big Beat	WIKM 42
1987 US	Scratch & Dent (Revolver)	Slinky Records	71262
1989 GER	Born To Be Wild (Link Wray)	LINE	LICD 9.00690
1990 US	Have Hearse Will Travel (1313 Mockingbird Lane)	Sundazed Music	WD40
2015 UK	Still Got That Hunger (The Zombies)	Cherry Red Records	m901144

== Collaborators ==
- 1313 Mockingbird Lane
- Joe Blaney
- Busta Jones
- Tony Scherr
- Gary Windo
- Link Wray
- Howie Wyeth
- The Zombies
