= Monster Mansion (disambiguation) =

Monster Mansion is a theme park ride.

Monster Mansion may also refer to:

- HM Prison Wakefield
- HM Prison Frankland
- Monster Building, Hong Kong

== See also ==
- Munster Mansion
