= Rock 'N Roll! The First 5,000 Years =

Rock 'N Roll!
- The First 5,000 Years
- Broadway Playbill
- Music: Various
- Lyrics: Various
- Book: Bob Gill and Robert Rabinowitz
- Productions: 1982 Broadway

Rock 'N Roll! The First 5,000 Years was a Broadway musical revue conceived by Bob Gill and Robert Rabinowitz, who also conceived Beatlemania.

== Broadway production ==
The original Broadway production premiered on October 5, 1982, at the St. James Theatre. The revue officially opened after 25 previews on October 24, 1982. The show closed on October 31, 1982 after only 9 regular performances.

The creative team included direction and choreography by Joe Layton, set design by Mark Ravitz, lighting design by Jules Fisher, and sound design by Bran Ferren. The music was arranged by John Simon.

The New York Times said the show "does a surprisingly good job of summarizing rock's contributions to our musical, cultural and even political life over the last 25 or more years. It's Broadway, so it can't be too loud or too wild, but it manages remarkable fidelity to its sources anyway."
