= Guitar synthesizer =

Electronic system to modify guitar sound

A guitar synthesizer (also guitar synthesiser or guitar synth) is any one of a number of musical systems that allow a guitarist to access synthesizer capabilities.

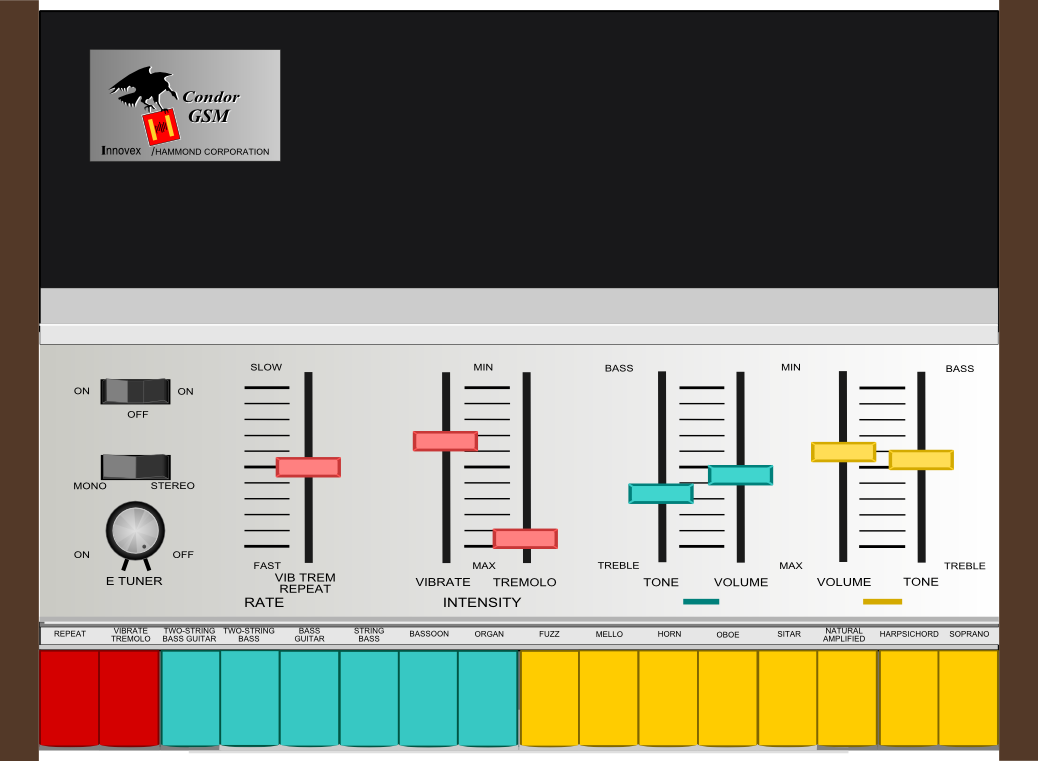
Multi-effects type
Hammond Innovex (Note: Innovex seems to be a subsidiary or division of Hammond Organ Company to produce Condor series, according to the product plate.) Condor GSM (c.1969)

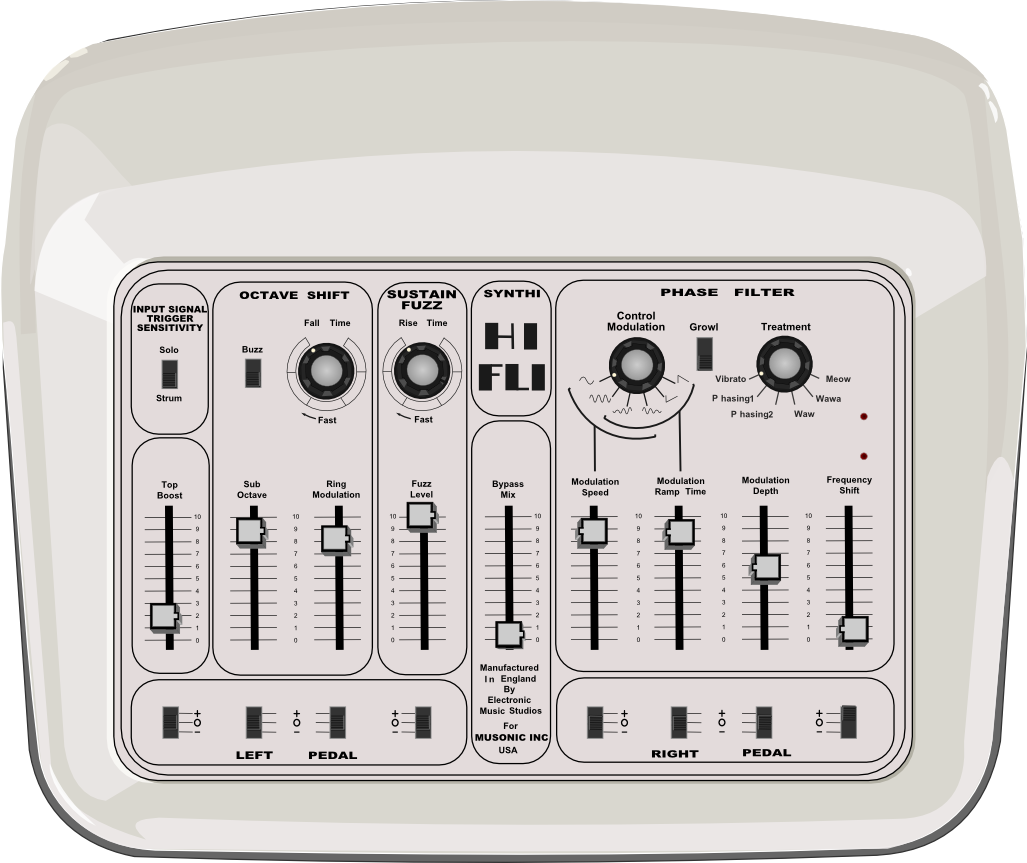
EMS Synthi Hi-Fli (1973) was a very expensive multi-effects.

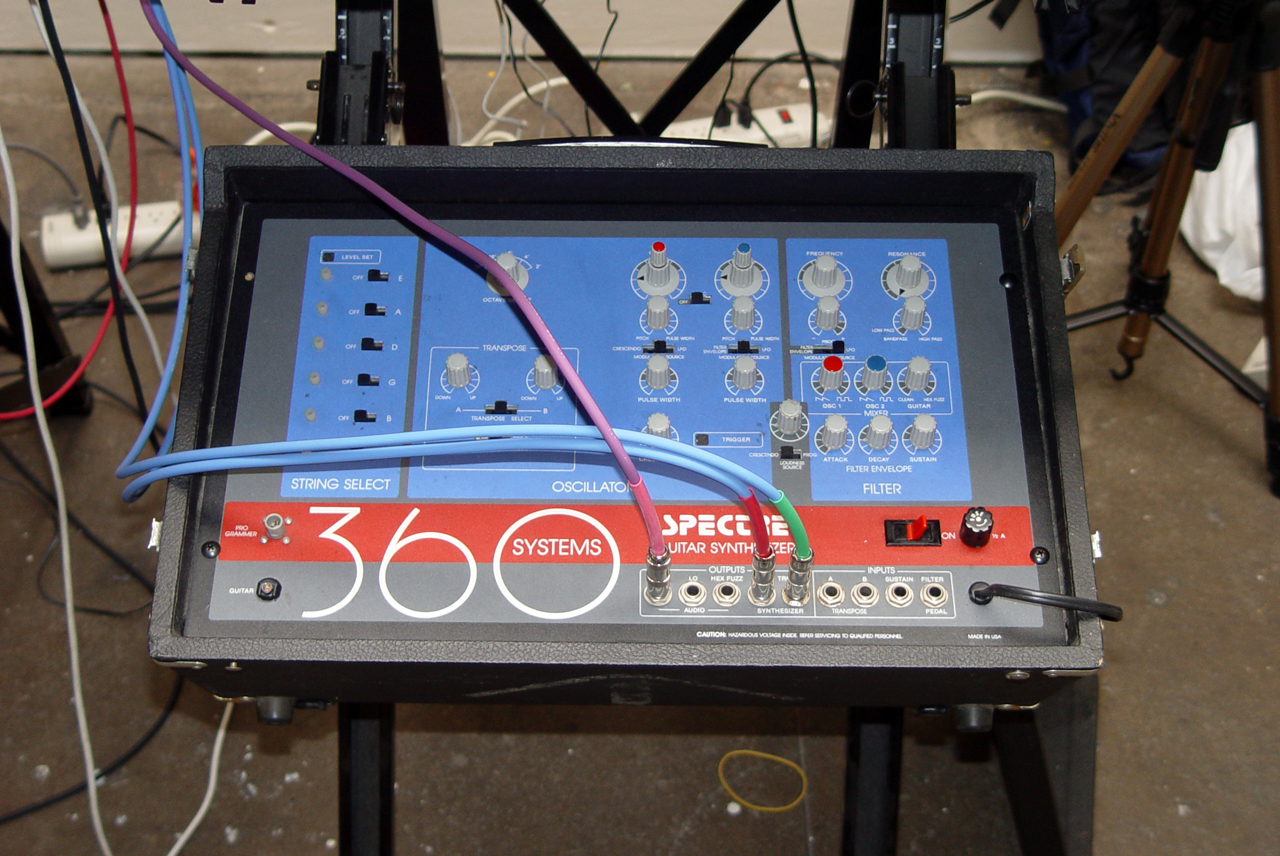
F-V converter type
360 Systems Spectre (mid 1970s) supports the world's first polyphony.

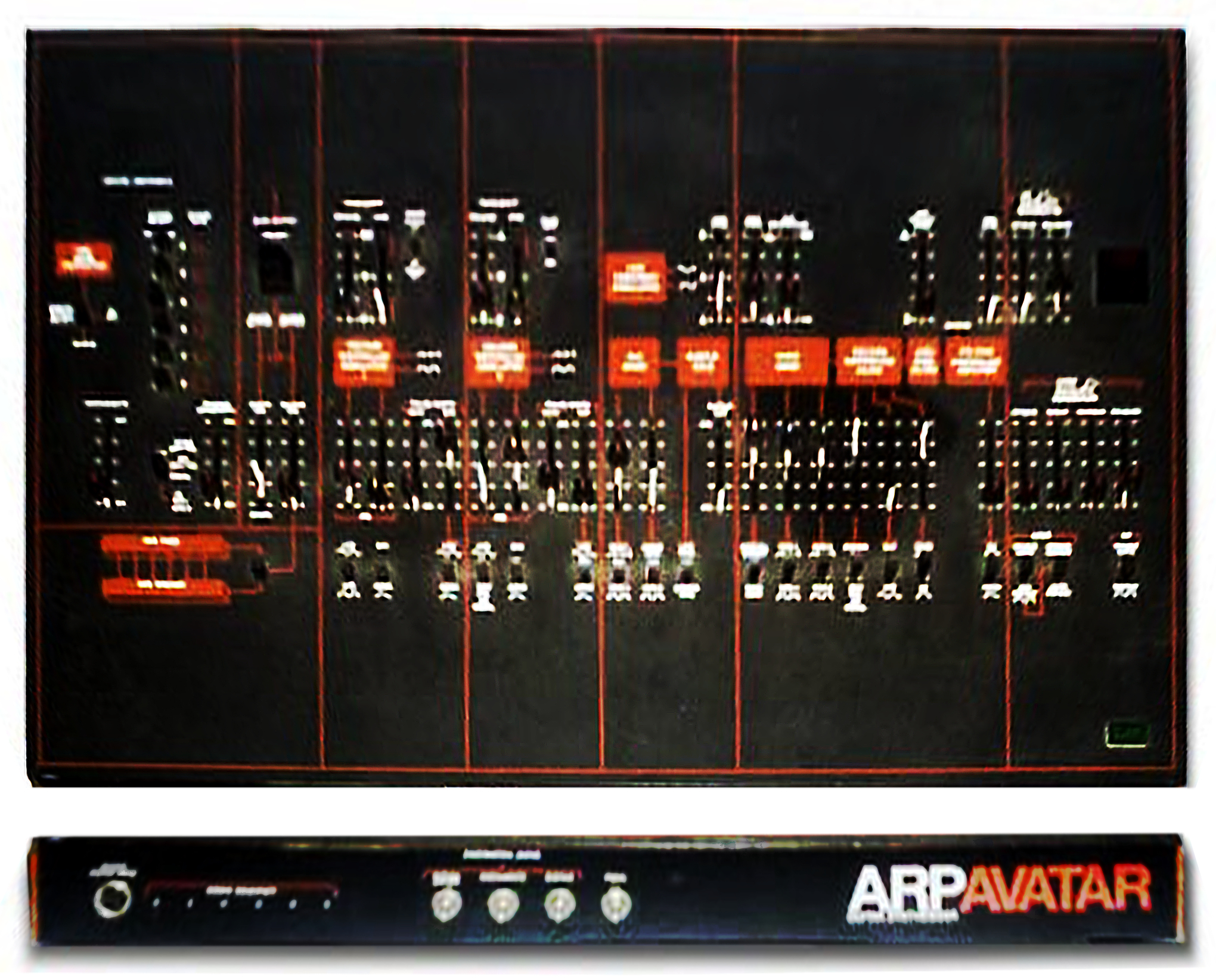
ARP Avatar (c.1977)
is an intermediate result of ARP Centaur VI project.

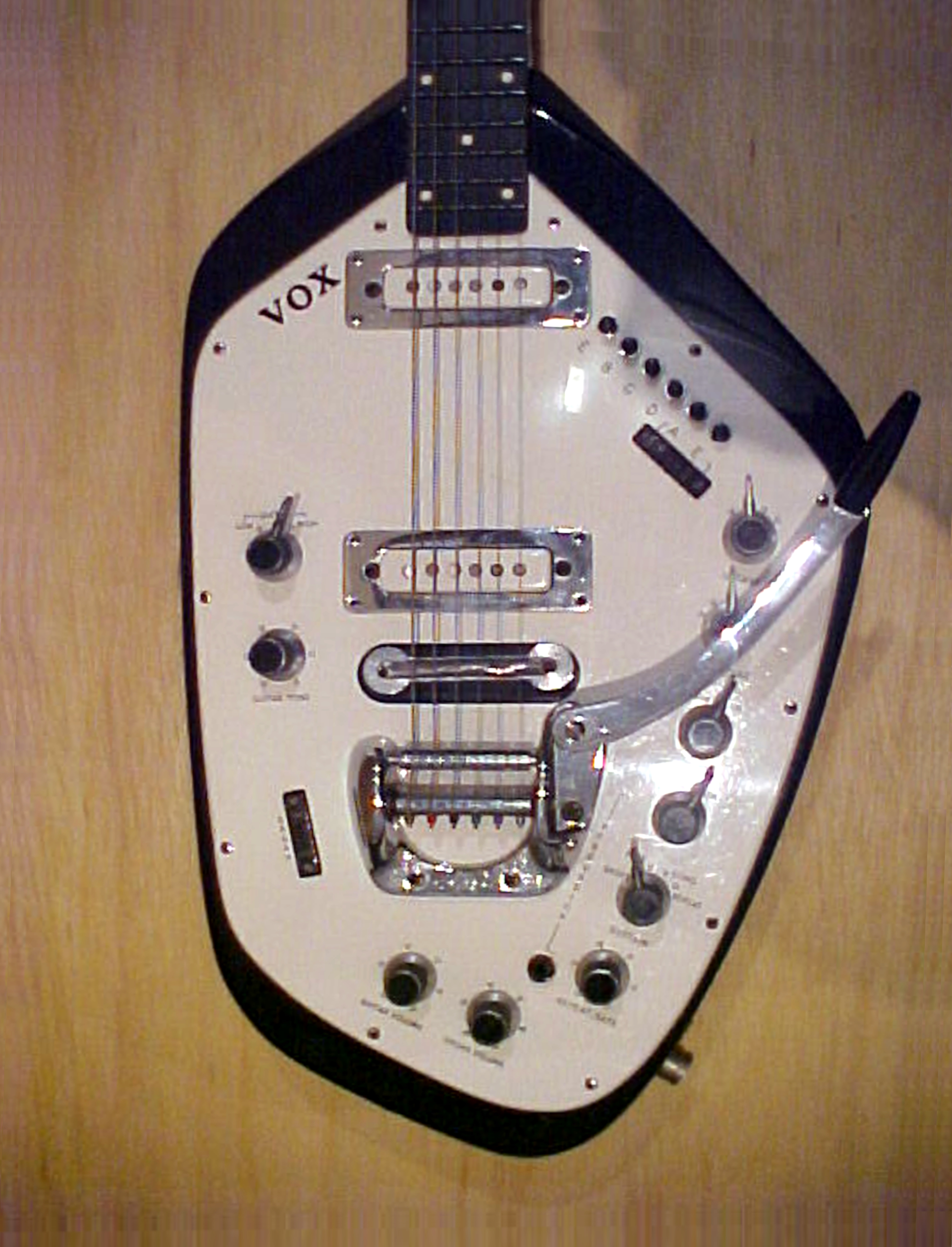
Guitorgan type
VOX V251 Guitar Organ (1966)

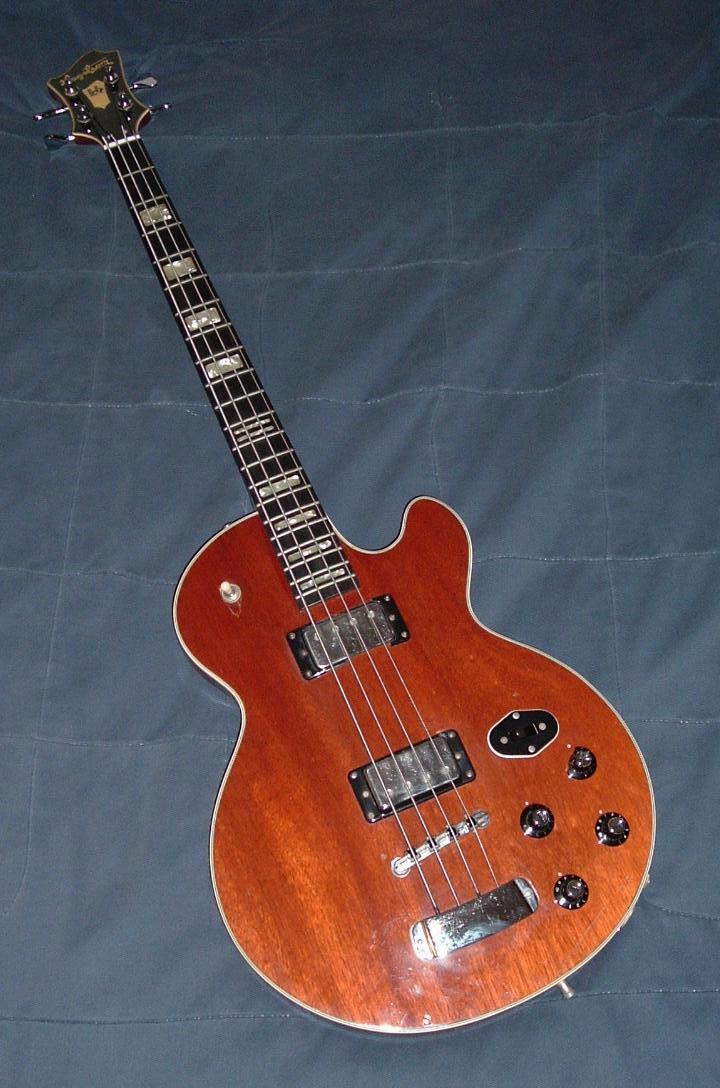
Ampeg/Hagstrom's hybrid Swede Patch 2000 (1976)

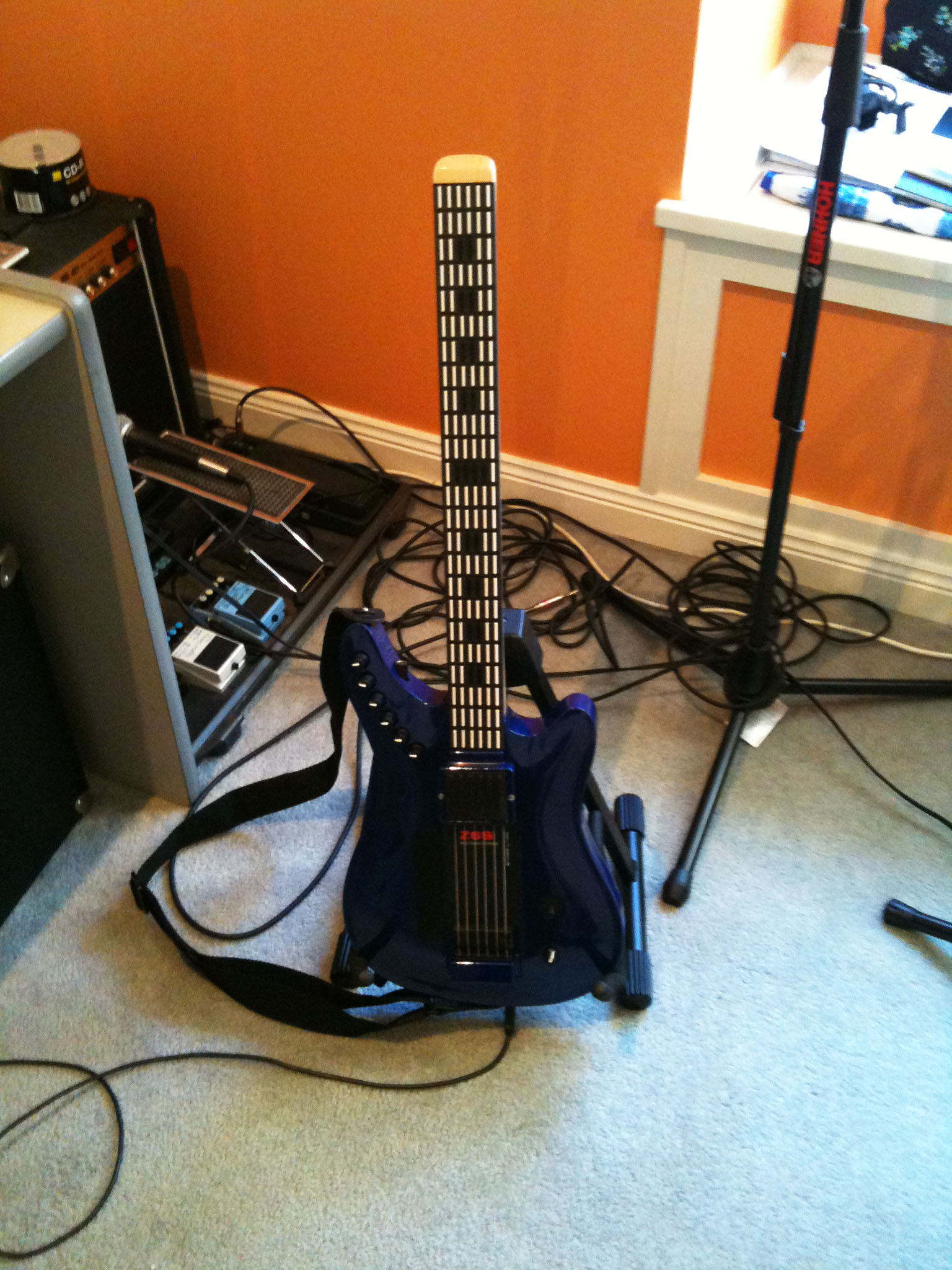
Starr Labs Z6 Series Ztar

== Overview ==
Today's guitar synths are direct descendants of 1970s devices from manufacturers (often in partnership) such as Hammond Innovex and Ovation, Ludwig, EMS, 360 Systems, Norlin Music and Maestro, Ampeg and Hagström, Arp, Roland Corporation and FujiGen (GR-500 and GR-300), New England Digital, Electro-Harmonix, Casio, Terratec/Axon, Starr Labs, Ibanez, Holt Electro Acoustic Research, Zeta Systems, and Yamaha.

In the early days, there were three main types of guitar-synthesizers:

- Multi-effects type
- Frequency-to-voltage converter type (using guitar with pickups)
- Guitorgan type (using guitar with fretboard switches)

Later, the multi-effects type evolved into modeling guitar, and the other two types evolved into current devices.

Presently, there are two main groups:

- Guitar-synth using guitars: regular guitars equipped with special electronic sensors that actuate a synthesizer
- Guitar-synth using non-guitar controllers: guitar-like MIDI controllers.

Both types have advantages and disadvantages.

=== Software solutions ===
Though the term "MIDI guitar" is sometimes used as a synonym, MIDI is not the indispensable feature of guitar synthesizers, especially after advances in DSP technology. Software-based guitar synthesizers without any special pickups have appeared, featuring polyphonic audio recognition (recognizing polyphonic pitches of each string, and possibly able to distinguish combination of fret positions and strings).

== Guitar-based models ==
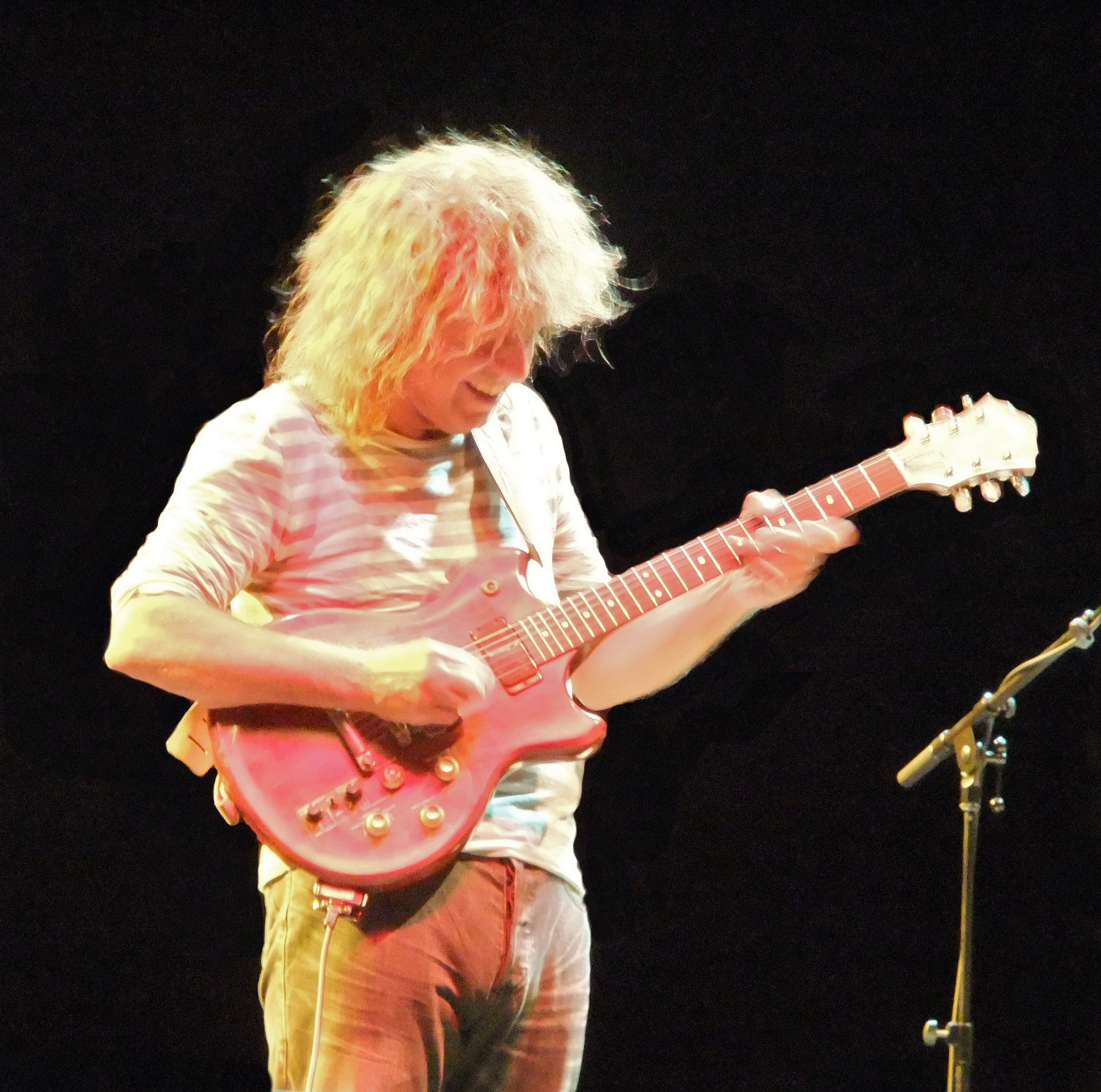
Fuji-Roland G303 (1979) (Note: Fuji-Roland was a joint-venture of FujiGen and Roland Corporation to produce guitar-synthesizer.) played by Pat Metheny.

Typical instruments in this category consist of:

- an electric, acoustic or bass guitar;
- a hexaphonic pickup (also called a "divided pickup") that provides a separate analog output for each vibrating string;
- a converter that translates each of these analog signals to corresponding digital representations, extracting the fundamental frequency or pitch of each, and passing this data along (CV/Gate in early days, and later MIDI-formatted).

This digital output can be stored or input directly to a synthesizer that generates corresponding notes made audible through an amplifier and speaker.

These components may be integrated into the instrument body or modularized in different ways. The hexaphonic pickup may be a separate component added to the guitar, or it may be built-in. Earlier guitar-synths required the musician to use a proprietary guitar with an integrated hexaphonic pickup.

=== Roland GK interface ===
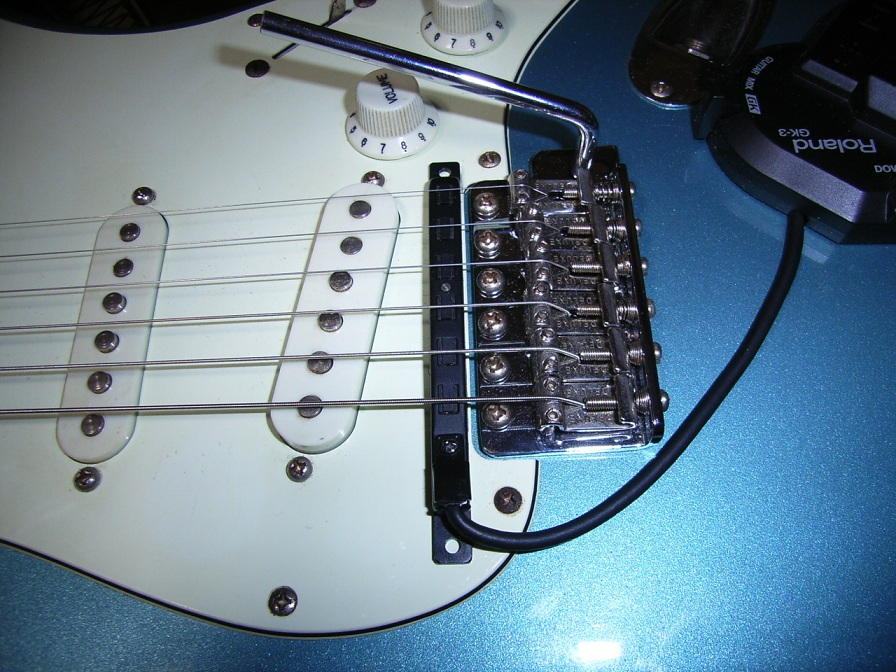
Roland GK-3 divided pickup mounted on normal electric guitar

Roland developed its GK series of hexaphonic drivers, consisting of a divided pickup and associated electronics (essentially a buffer preamp for each string signal). These were used in two ways, either with pickup and buffer module mountable to the guitar, or as a "GK-KIT" intended to be fitted into a guitar body by a luthier or manufacturer.

The initial GK-1 had 24 output pins, with a resultantly bulky interface cable. The design evolved into a smaller 13-pin format, used in the GK-2, GK-2A, and GK-3 pickups, as well as the GK-3B bass pickup.

Guitars supporting GK interface

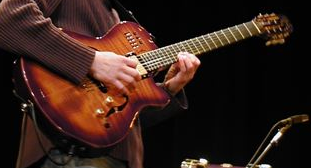
Godin Multiac Jazz.

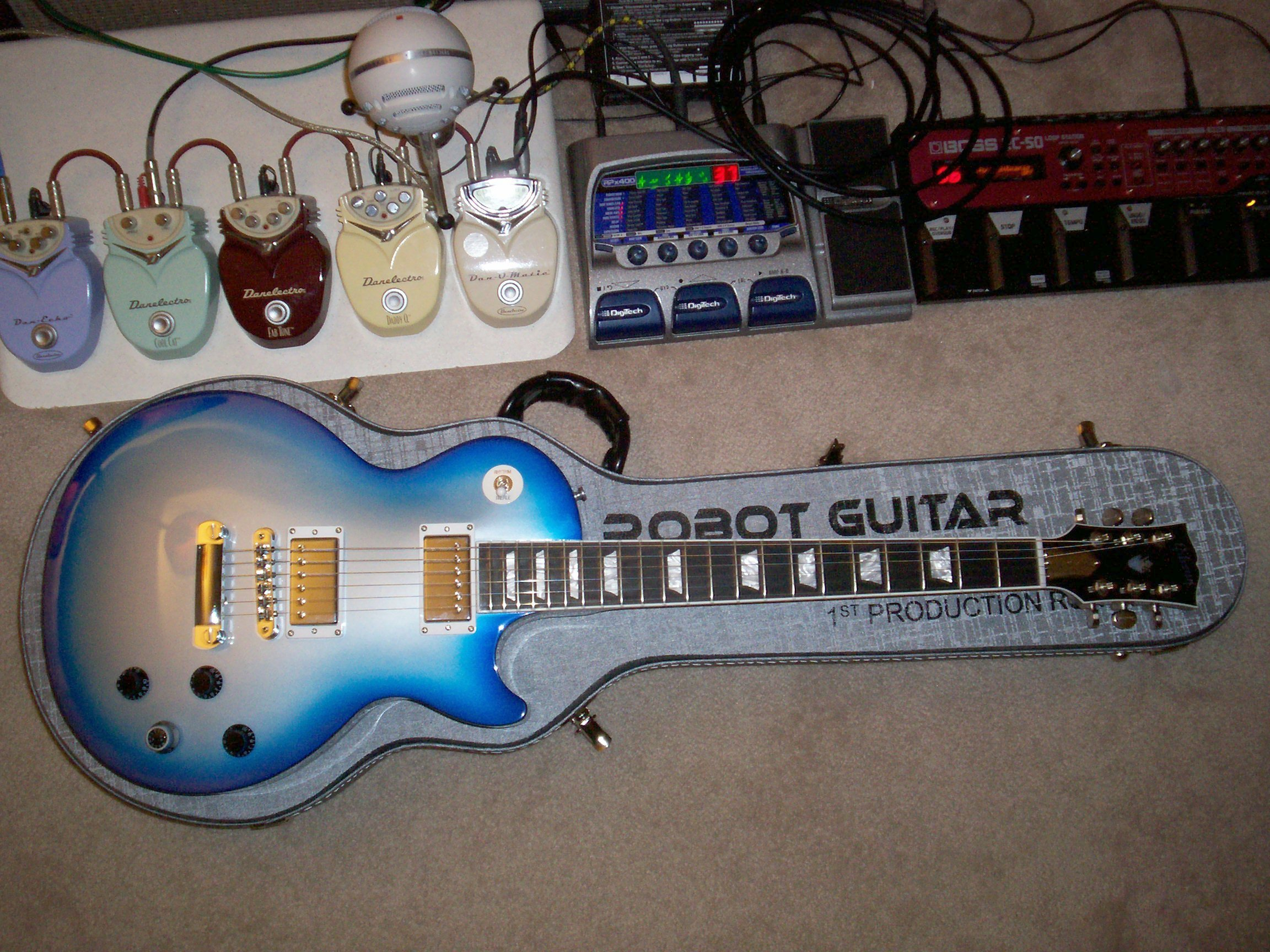
(right) Gibson Robot Guitar; on version 2, GK interface was introduced.

Guitar manufacturers that offered models with the installed "Roland-ready" pickup kit include Switch Music, Washburn, Fender, Squier, and Ibanez (RG420GK). Fender released their Fender VG Stratocaster, a Standard Series instrument with inbuilt GK-2A hexaphonic pickup kit. Fender had previously offered a short-lived American Series version in the mid-1990s.

Godin and a few other guitar manufacturers have offered guitar models with an integrated "RMC hexaphonic pickup and preamp system" that is compatible with Roland devices. The RMC system uses piezo-crystal pickups built into the saddles of the guitar bridge, which conduct the vibrations of the strings as a signal that can be converted into a (13-pin) hexaphonic synth signal. This setup can be found in the xtSA and the LGX models.

The GK drivers or compatible controllers are connected to a dedicated synthesizer module like Roland GR-1 or Roland GR-55 via a cable with 13-pin connectors. The module sits on the floor and has the appearance of a large effects unit, with footswitches for the selection of sounds and memory banks.

=== MIDI guitars ===
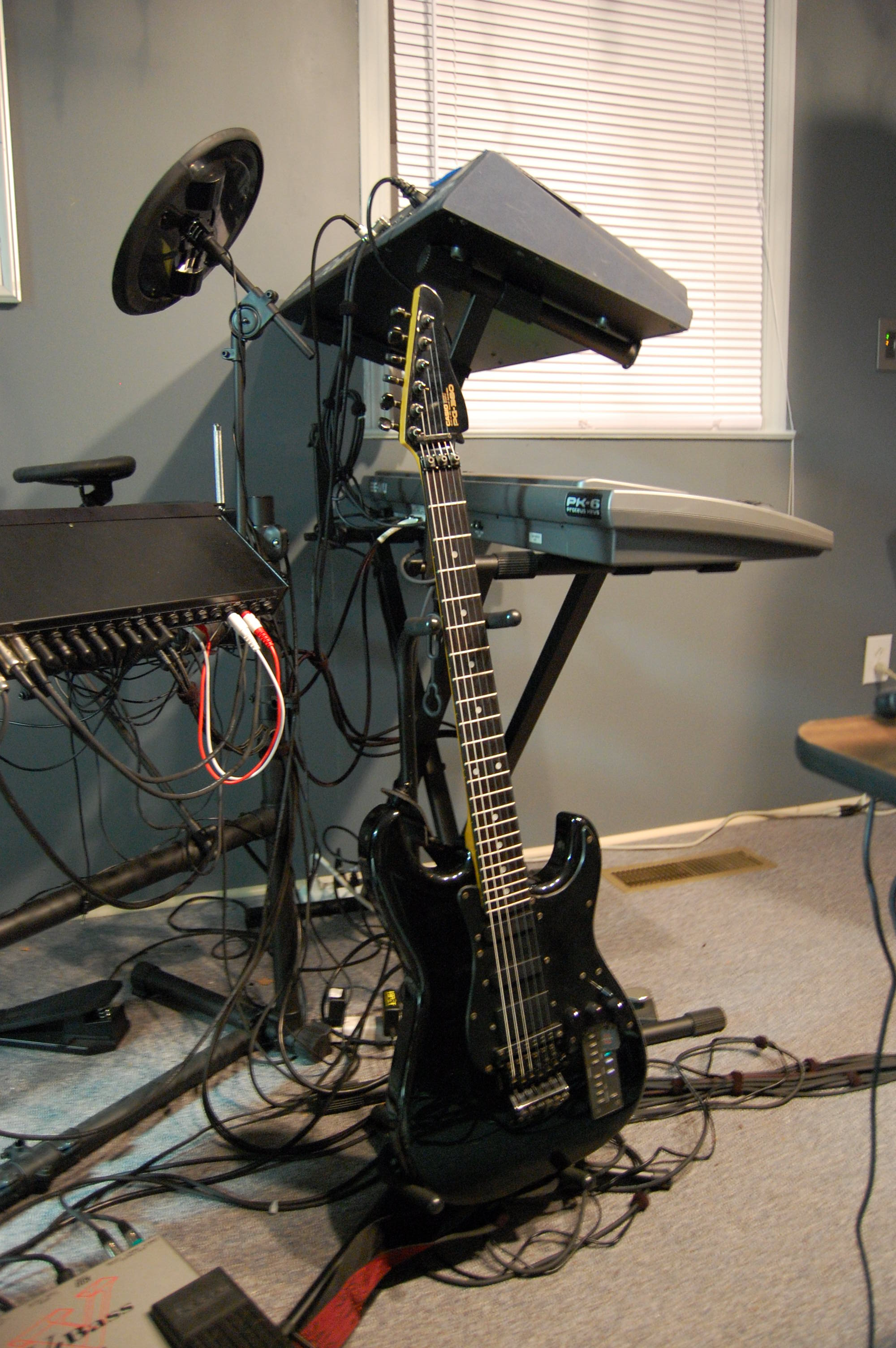
Casio PG-380 MIDI Guitar (1988)

Usually, a cable connects the hexaphonic pickup to the converter. This allows the guitarist to be unencumbered by an on-board converter. However, several Casio models in the PG and MG product lines integrated the guitar, the hex pickup, and the converter as a single unit. Casio remains the only manufacturer to try this approach. The advantage of this arrangement is that a MIDI cable can be plugged directly into the guitar. Disadvantages include weight and the need for an external power supply.

In addition to these configurations, the converter may also be combined with a synthesizer. The earliest models were combination converter/synthesizers, and this type is still produced. As the early integrated models predated the MIDI standard, their components were not interchangeable; the guitarist's only option was to use whatever synthesizer came with the converter, and vice versa. By the 2000s (decade), however, all converter/synthesizers were MIDI-compatible, so any synthesizer with MIDI-input capability (the vast majority since the 1990s) can be used. Stand-alone converter units also drive synthesizers via MIDI.

=== Pros and cons ===
Among the advantages of synth guitars are that the musician can play either the guitar or the synthesizer alone, or blend the timbres of both together in any ratio. Many models can be used with almost any guitar, with the addition of a hexaphonic pickup. In the early systems, there was a detectable latency, especially at lower pitches, between playing a note on the guitar and the note's sounding on the synthesizer, but this was remedied in 2000s-era instruments. While this type is also somewhat prone to note-tracking glitches, the problem can be overcome by adjusting the sensitivity controls of the pickup or converter—and by playing more precisely. Another possible disadvantage is that not all of the variable performance parameters available on a synthesizer can be actuated from a guitar; a synth guitar lacks assignable controls to open a filter in real-time, for example. Nevertheless, contemporary synth-guitar designs often include an expression pedal for such purposes.

==== Translation of guitar techniques ====
Some systems consist of two separated parts, the guitar controller and the interface and sound module, where the former controls the latter (as in Roland instruments). One of the challenges of guitar synths is that not all performance techniques can be smoothly translated into MIDI and resulting sound. Harmonics, palm mutes, hammer-ons and pull-offs, and pick slides are not easily picked up by guitar synths, largely due to imperfect fretting technique; with the exception of harmonics and palm mutes, these techniques can be achieved with a concentrated effort to maintain good fretting. Similarly, the synthesizer portion of a system often lacks the variety of controls (sliders, faders, knobs) for synthesis parameters that are normally available on a standard keyboard synthesizer.

Nevertheless, controlling a synthesizer with a guitar has some advantages over a keyboard. More expansive chords are possible, and some intervals are easier to reach. As well, guitar synths provide access to sounds normally available only to keyboard players and percussionists. A guitar player could play a flute part using a sampled flute patch, or play percussion by triggering synth drum voices. By blending the regular electric guitar tone with synthesized sounds, a guitarist can create a hybrid timbre. The guitar synth also enables a guitarist with limited or no keyboard-playing skills to provide MIDI input into digital notation programs such as Sibelius, Finale or MuseScore.

== Guitar-like MIDI controllers ==
Some manufacturers of guitar-synthesizers wanted to eliminate the tracking and latency problems associated with guitar-based systems, while retaining the expressiveness of the guitar. They achieved this, to some degree, by redesigning the instrument part of the human-machine interface so that it was better suited to driving a synthesizer.

=== Earlier models ===
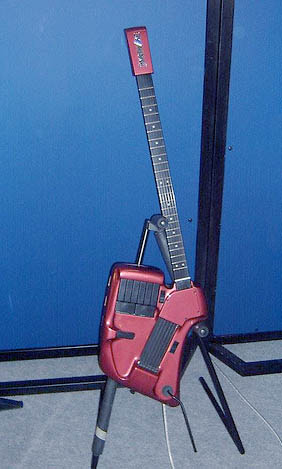
SynthAxe (1986) by Bill Aitken

The 1980s-era SynthAxe was a futuristic controller consisting of a fretboard attached to the body at an obtuse angle. The fretboard strings were used to indicate pitch and sensed string bends. A separate, shorter set of strings were used for picking and strumming. These triggered the notes fretted on the fretboard's strings. It also featured trigger keys that could be used instead of the trigger strings. A whammy bar was assignable to any MIDI parameter. The SynthAxe was prohibitively expensive and therefore not widely used. Two of the most famous SynthAxe users are guitarist Allan Holdsworth and percussionist Roy "Futureman" Wooten of the jazz quartet Béla Fleck and the Flecktones. Wooten programmed his modified SynthAxe controller with a variety of drum kit and percussion sounds. The instrument was previously owned by jazz guitarist Lee Ritenour.

Yamaha originally entered the market with a guitar-like MIDI controller called the "G-10," considerably less expensive than the SynthAxe. The G-10 had two assignable knobs and an assignable whammy bar and it used six strings, all the same gauge (thickness), which sensed both right- and left-hand input. The fact that the strings were all of the same thickness made the instrument feel substantially different for a player, in contrast to the typical guitar, and may have hindered the instrument's acceptance.

Both the SynthAxe and Yamaha G-10 have been discontinued.

=== Recent models ===
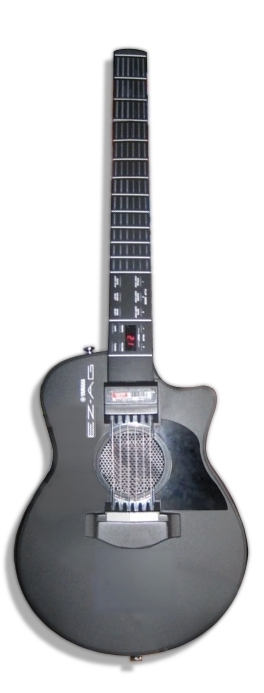
Yamaha EZ-AG

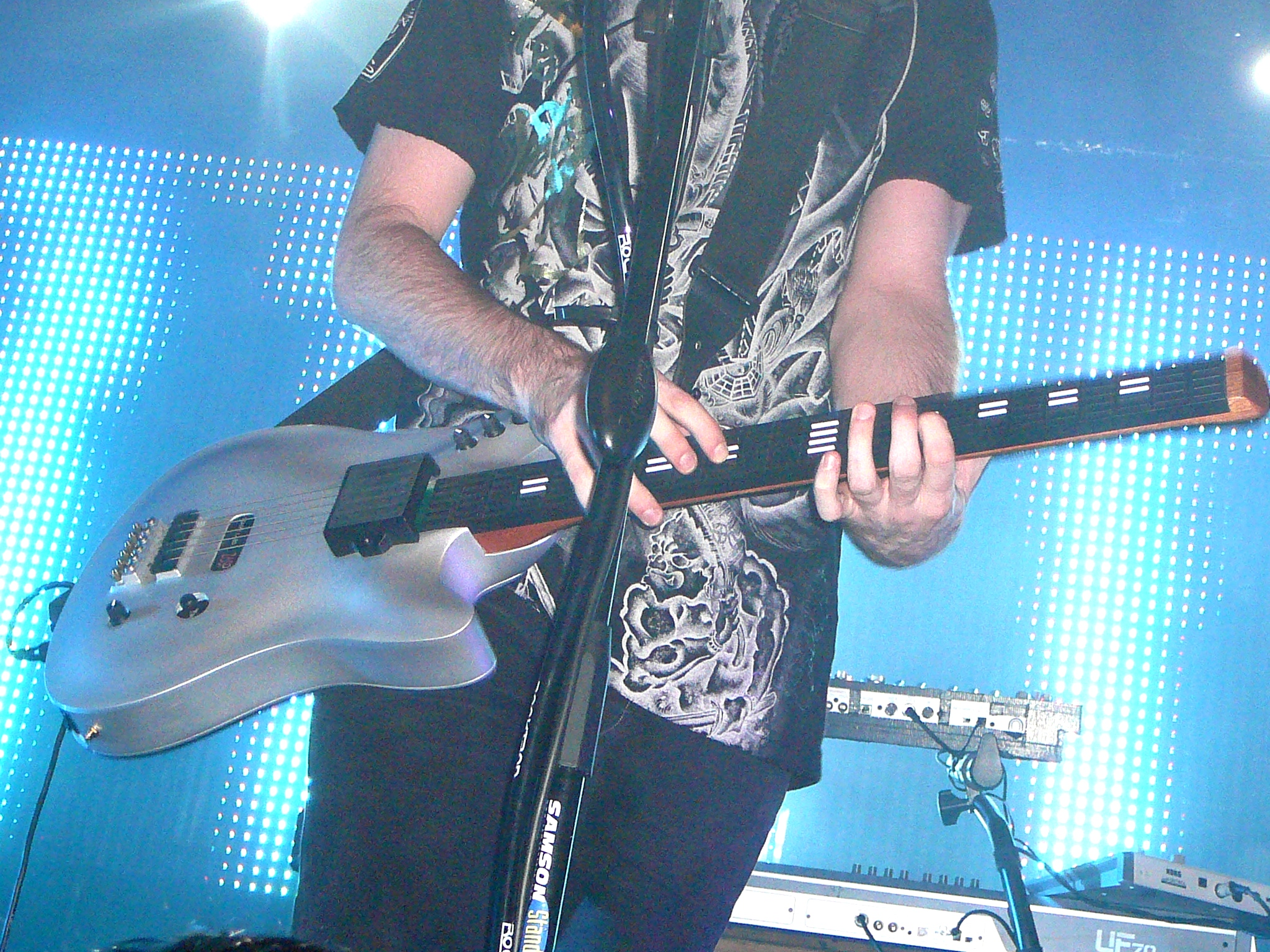
Starr Labs Ztar played by Rob Swire

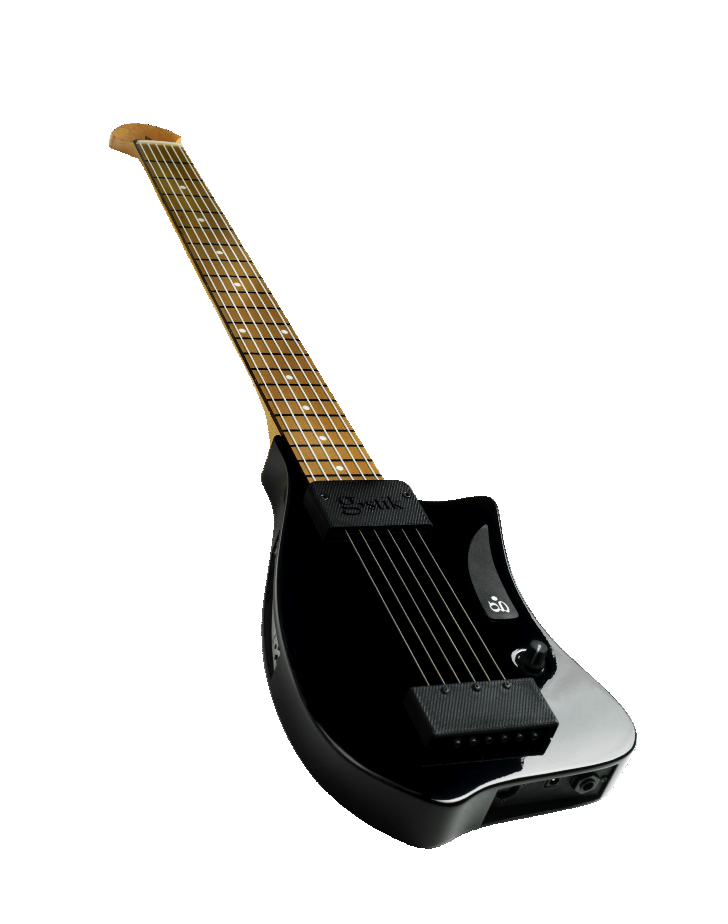
You Rock Guitar (MIDI guitar controller and synth)

Beginning in the early 2000s, Yamaha has re-entered the market with simple midi guitars (EZ-AG and EZ-EG) these have illuminated frets to teach finger technique and 20 voices.

Starr Labs' Ztar is one of the few remaining guitar-like controller product lines still in production. A Ztar differs significantly from the SynthAxe and Yamaha G-10 in that the "fretboard" is covered with keys, not strings. Keys in the same row can trigger notes at the same time. This has no analog on a real guitar. It would be as if a single string were polyphonic. A number of variations are available, including an instrument that uses strings for strumming or picking, to trigger notes, whereas the pitch of the notes is determined by the keys that cover what would be a "fretboard" in an ordinary, stringed guitar. Starr labs recently introduced the Z5S, a simpler and less expensive version of the Z6S. MIDI guitar controllers have regained popularity due to the Z6 model, possibly because of its usage by Rob Swire of Pendulum, who uses it on songs where he is required to perform vocals.

The You Rock Guitar, introduced in 2010 by You Rock Digital, combines a MIDI guitar controller/recorder with a patented touch-sensitive fingerboard and an on-board synthesizer. The instrument supports not only strumming and picking, but also tapping and sliding techniques, and provides a whammy bar for pitch bending and a modulation. The You Rock Guitar is used by guitarists such as George Pajon Jr. (Fergie, The Black Eyed Peas) and Josh Kelley.

=== Video game guitar controllers ===
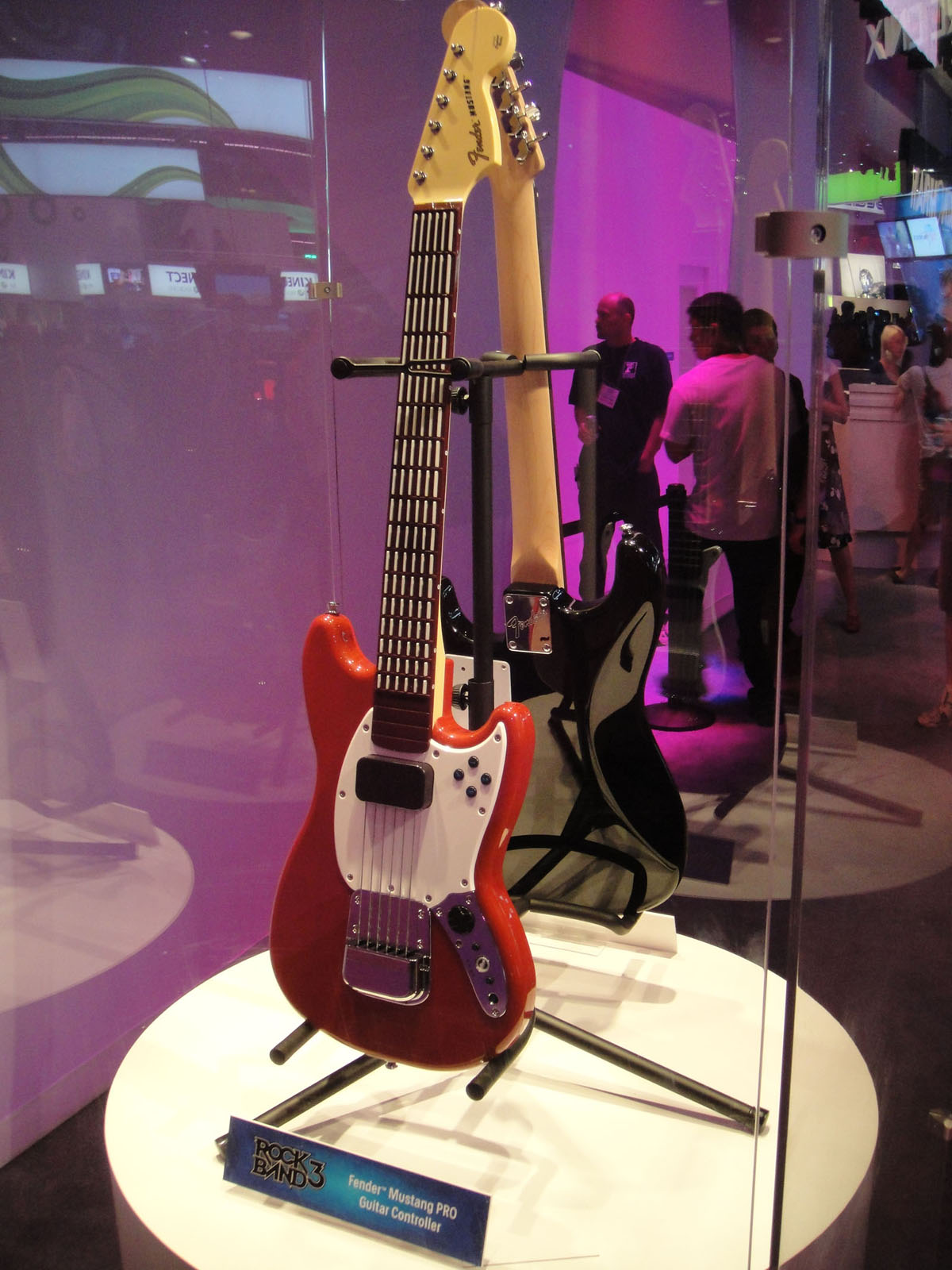
Fender Mustang Pro Guitar Controller

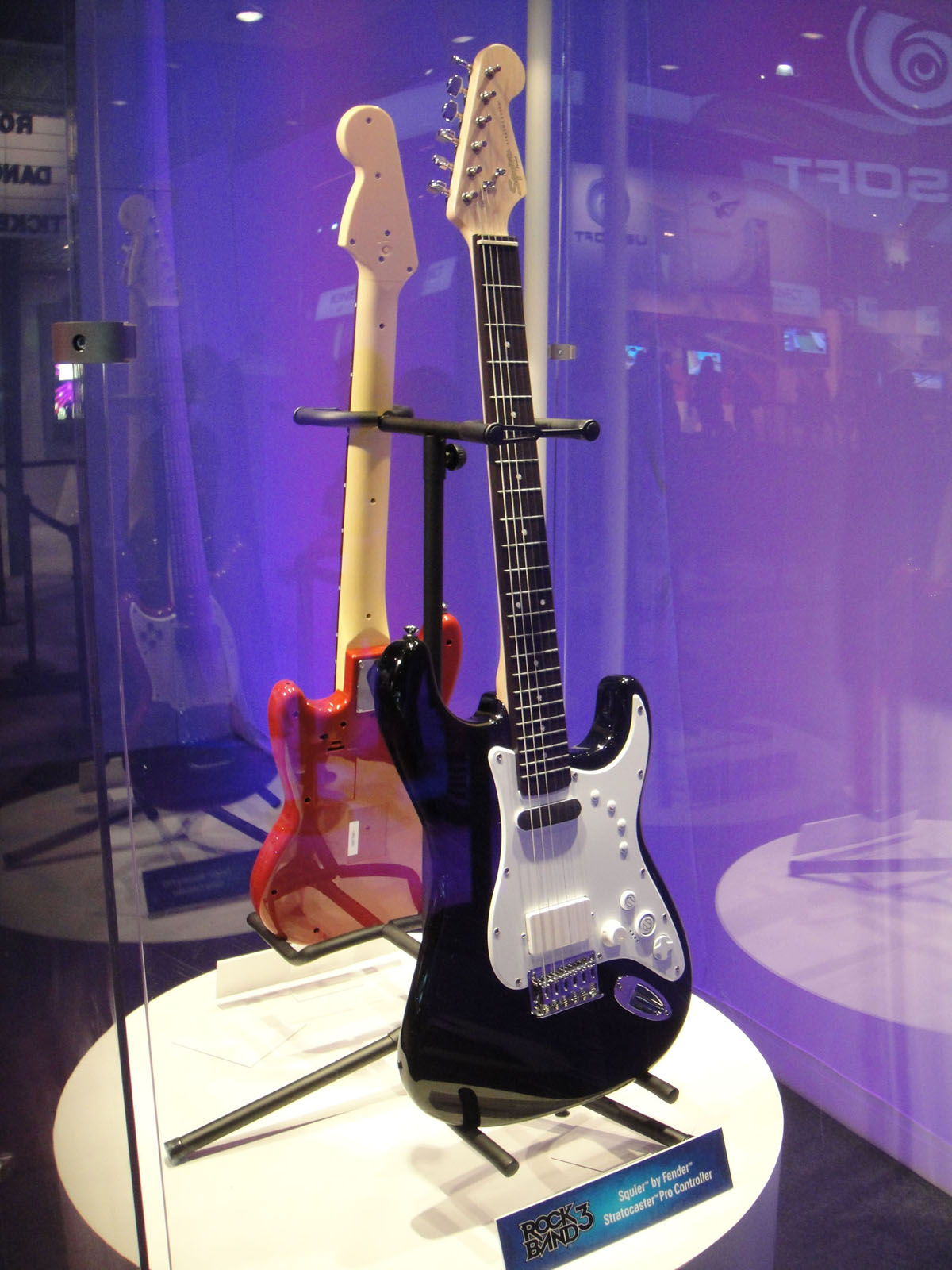
Squier Stratocaster Pro Controller

Rock Band 3 (2010) featured three guitar controllers. One was modeled after the Fender Mustang, with six string sensors stretching from the bridge to the location of the neck pickup of a standard guitar, and 102 buttons in 6 columns of 17 frets, which together create MIDI note data. A second was built with Fender as a fully functional guitar, with a bridge pickup "listening" to the strings and sending MIDI information to the MIDI port.

"You Rock Guitar" is compatible with Guitar Hero and Rock Band 3, including RB 3 Pro Mode. The guitar provides a number of features intended to help gamers become guitarists. The You Rock Practice Mode provides audible feedback when the user plays with the guitar's built-in song loops. The guitar can simultaneously drive a game system, an amplifier, headphones, a MIDI synthesizer, and music software via USB.

=== Pros and cons ===
The advantages of the guitar-like MIDI controller systems are that the tracking (the speed and accuracy of the notes the instrument produces) is much better than guitar-based systems, which means that there is no noticeable latency or pitch glitches. As well, whammy bars and other controllers can be assigned to any MIDI function, which gives the performer more on-stage control of their sound. Further, these controllers offer playing options, such as the keyboard-like tapping style, that are not possible on traditional guitars. Finally, the instruments with touch-sensitive fingerboards never need tuning, and they are easier on the fingers of beginning and casual players.

The disadvantages for guitar players are that the controller is not exactly a guitar, and the feel is different. Some instruments are rare and expensive, which may make it difficult to repair or service them.

== Musicians ==
A number of well-known guitarists have used guitar synthesizers, often working in the jazz or progressive rock genres, or soundtrack composition.

== See also ==
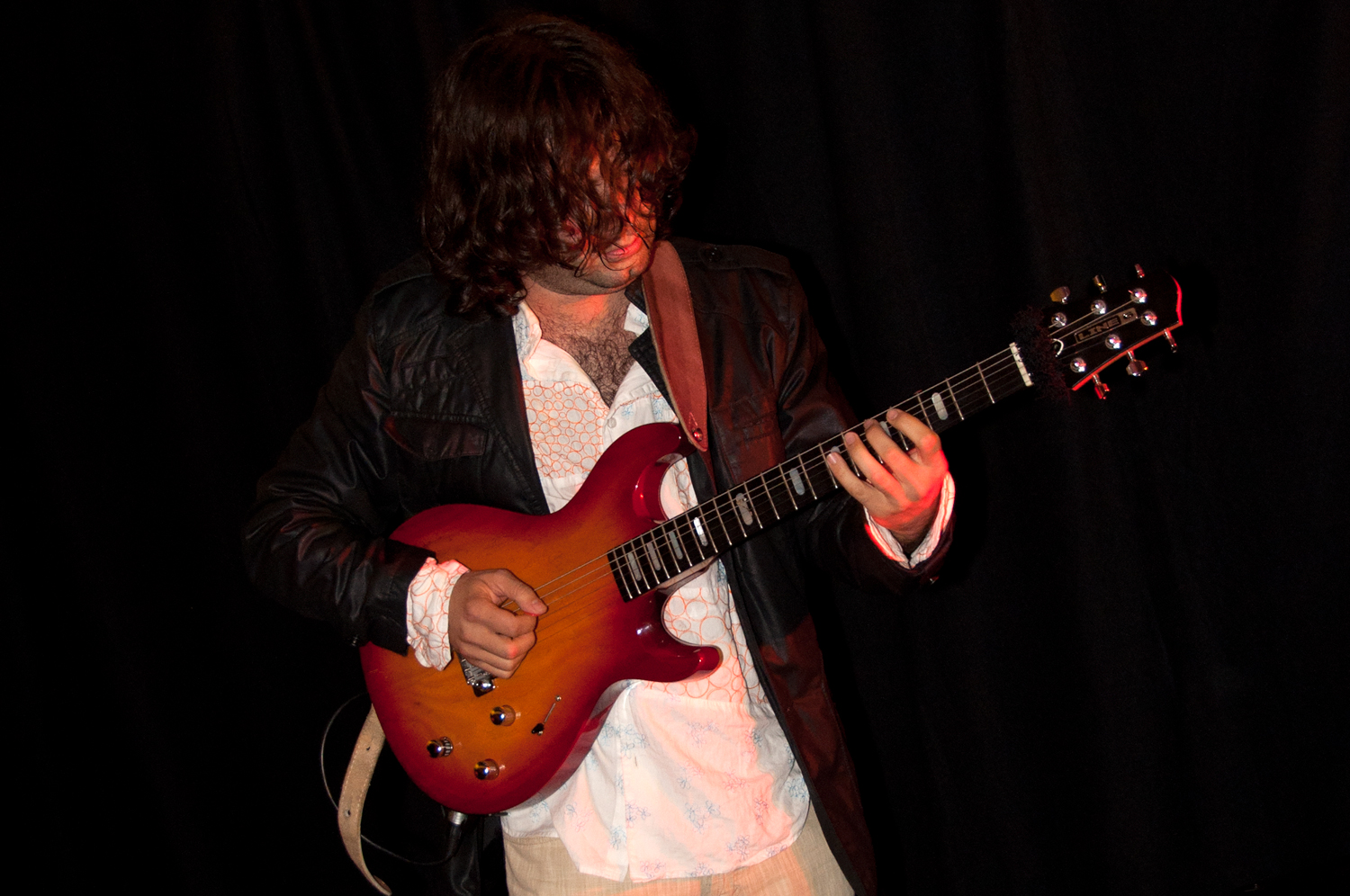
Line 6 Variax modeling guitar

- Effects unit
- Guitorgan
- Variax (modeling guitar by Line 6)
- Synthesizer
  - Keytar
  - Wind controller
