= Robert Rabinowitz =

American illustrator and graphic designer

Robert Rabinowitz (b. Brooklyn, New York) is an American illustrator and graphic designer.

== Career ==
Rabinowitz was a long-time business partner of Bob Gill, who he had first met in the US Army in the 1950s. In 1975 Gill and Rabinowitz created Beatlemania, a multimedia history of the 1960s set to music by The Beatles. The show was the largest multimedia musical on Broadway up until that time.

The pair's next project was a celebration of the Lincoln Center's 20th anniversary, involving five giant movie screens mounted on the facade of the Metropolitan Opera House, playing a history of the center. After this they were invited to create a retrospective play of the history of rock'n'roll music. Entitled Rock 'N Roll! The First 5,000 Years, it previewed at the St. James Theatre on October 5, 1982, officially opening on October 24, before closing on October 31 after just nine shows, to terrible reviews.

== Personal life ==
With his family, Rabinowitz owned the Villa Rosa Bonheur in the Spuyten Duyvil section of Riverdale, New York until his death in 2016.

He is the brother of the former Chief Justice of the Supreme Court of Alaska, Jay Rabinowitz, cousin of integrative medicine media personality, Barrie Cassileth, and uncle to Olympic Cross Country Skier, Judy Rabinowitz.
