= Munster Mansion =

Universal Studios backlot set

Coordinates: 34°8′20.56″N 118°20′44.73″W

- The Munsters location
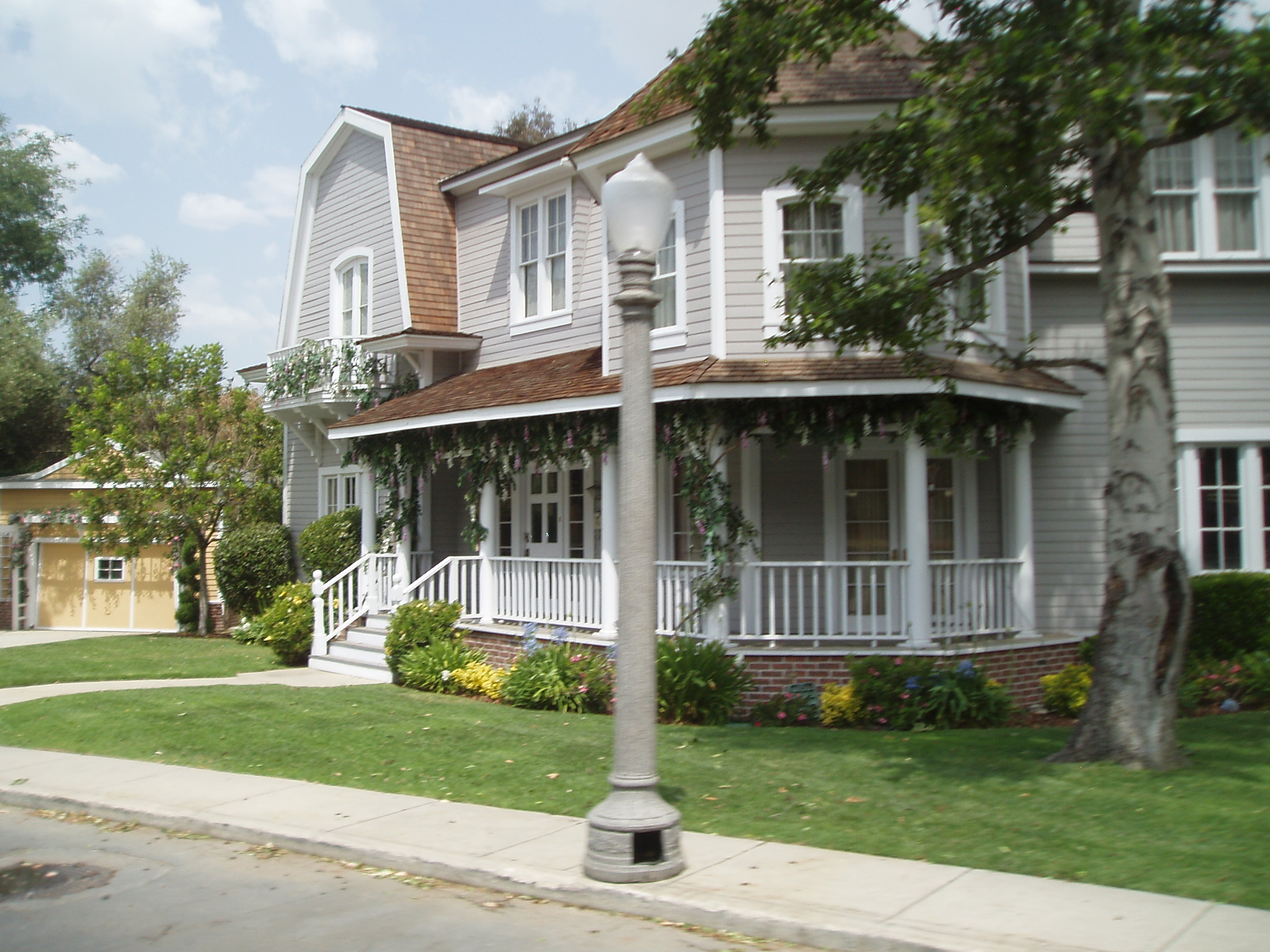
- The set as it appeared in 2011

In-universe information
- Type: House
- Locations: 1313 Mockingbird Lane; Mockingbird Heights
- Characters: Herman Munster; Lily Munster; Grandpa; Marilyn Munster; Eddie Munster

The Munster Mansion is an exterior set located at Universal Studios. It is most famous for its use in the 1964–1966 sitcom The Munsters, but has appeared in several other productions, both before and after.

== History ==
=== 1946: So Goes My Love ===
The house, built in the Second Empire Victorian architectural style, was constructed on Stage 12 in 1946 for the filming of the turn-of-the-century period romantic film So Goes My Love. Placed alongside another Victorian-style house built specifically for the production, the 2 1/2-story set was utilized on a soundstage for all shots in the film.

=== 1950s: On the Universal backlot ===
After production of So Goes My Love ended, both house sets were put into storage. In the early 1950s Universal decided to build a new exterior residential street on its front lot, and these sets were then taken out of storage and reassembled where they became a part of "River Road;" one of a number of residential streets constructed in the area. The house was then seen in a number of Universal productions through the 1950s (see List of appearances in film and television, below).

=== 1964: The Munsters TV series ===
The house received its most famous make-over in 1964 when it was redressed for the premiere of the sitcom The Munsters. The third-story octagon tower with its mansard roof and four windows was altered into a covered widow's walk with a tented roof, the second-story center window was given a faux gingerbread gable, and a chimney and a crooked vampire-bat weathervane were added. The grounds were equipped with bare trees, dead leaves and a stone entrance gate. After a slight "roughing up" with new darker paint, the house and its grounds were used for all the exterior shots on the series, with interiors filmed on separate soundstages. The address for the house was at one point supposed to be 43 Mockingbird Lane, Camelot, New Jersey, but was changed to 1313 Mockingbird Lane in the city of Mockingbird Heights (state unknown) as shooting began.

Within the fiction of The Munsters series, the mansion was built on the remains of an old fort, with Grandpa providing the down payment when Herman and Lily bought the home.

After production of The Munsters in 1966 and the film Munster, Go Home, the house was stripped of its trees, gates and other landscape dressing. The set became known as the Munster Mansion, but that name was never used in the show.

=== After The Munsters ===
Universal replaced its entire front lot, and the Munster house, among other sets, were relocated to the backlot on "Colonial Street". Although the house was used for the television movie The Munsters' Revenge only close-up shots of windows and the side garden exterior were possible, with stock footage from the previous 1966 movie Munster, Go Home used for long shots as the house had undergone several changes.

Throughout the early part of the 80s the house was renovated again and became more modern. The most notable changes were the removal of the architectural details added for The Munsters, including the gingerbread gable over the second-story center window and the replacement of the columns and railings of the widow's walk tower. The original first floor front porch was replaced with a larger wrap-around porch.

The house then fell into a state of severe disrepair and by 1987 was unable to be used for the original TV pilot of The Munsters Today. Stock footage was again used from Munster, Go Home. The house, after production had ceased on The Munsters Today, appeared in many films and TV shows again – including The 'Burbs, Dragnet and on the TV series Coach starring Craig T. Nelson.

In the mid-2000s, for the second season of Desperate Housewives, the second floor was demolished and all of the remaining architectural details on the first floor were removed. A new second floor was constructed with a somewhat similar design, changing the original mansard gable into a gambrel gable, reflecting a more Dutch Colonial Revival architectural style.

== Scale model replica for The Munsters Today TV series ==
The producers on The Munsters Today felt the well-known Munster house was just as important as the characters, so an authentic scale model replica was built for the series to accompany the limited color stock footage from Munster, Go Home. The scale model worked well on the show, and many did not notice it was not the same house. The garden was decorated with dried oregano. There are some slight differences between the original house and the scale model used for the new show: seen from the front, the gates are now directly in front of the porch as opposed to slightly to the right. The gateposts are also dramatically smaller and less bulky than in the original; and around the perimeter, instead of a wall, are yet more posts with spiked fencing in-between for several intervals, somewhat similar to what is seen in the 1964 color pilot. There is also a small arched basement window that looks down into Grandpa's lab. Today this model can be seen in Universal's new House of Horrors. A virtual tour of the Munster Mansion is available on The Munsters Today Information Archives website, along with the show's "career" across film and TV history. The website also includes rare details of the model replica, and details the various made for TV movies that utilized different Munster Mansion variations, such as Here Come The Munsters and The Munsters' Scary Little Christmas.

== Today ==
As stated above, the set's most recent appearance is as 4351 Wisteria Lane in the ABC series Desperate Housewives, with a radical second floor makeover due to the show's producers being concerned that audiences would be distracted by seeing the Munsters' house in the series. The house has been a center of bad news on Wisteria Lane, with a total of four families having established a residence in the home: Mr. & Mrs. Edwin Mullins; Betty Applewhite and her children; Alma Hodge; and partners Bob Hunter and Lee McDermott.

== List of appearances in film and television ==
- So Goes My Love, (1946) featuring Don Ameche and Myrna Loy
- Abbott and Costello Meet the Invisible Man (1951), seen in the beginning as the physician's home and lab.
- Just Across the Street, (1952) starring Ann Sheridan
- All I Desire (1953) starring Barbara Stanwyck
- One Desire (1955) starring Anne Baxter and Rock Hudson
- Monster on the Campus (1958) starring Joanna Moore
- Rock-A-Bye Baby, (1958) starring Jerry Lewis
- Leave it to Beaver (1957-1963), seen in season 4 episodes 28 and 33 from 1961. In "Mistaken Identity," it is referred to as the haunted "old McMahan house" on which Richard breaks a window and blames the Beaver. In "Community Chest", Beaver, with Gilbert, nervously approach the Munster house as it has "No Tresspassing" and "No Solicitors" signs on the porch steps.
- Alfred Hitchcock Presents, seen in the 1961 Season 7 episode "Bang! You're Dead"
- Thriller (U.S. TV series), seen in the 1960 Season 1 episode 9 "Girl with a Secret", episode 32 "Mr. George", and 1962 Season 2 episode "Cousin Tundifer"
- Coach (1989-1997) as the athletic director, Howard Burleigh's house
- Wagon Train seen in the 1963 Season 7 episodes 6 and 10 "The Myra Marshall Story" and "The Kitty Pryer Story"
- Kraft Suspense Theatre (1964), seen in episode 13 of season one, "Who Is Jennifer?" starring Gloria Swanson & Brenda Scott.
- The Brass Bottle (1964) starring Tony Randall and Barbara Eden
- The Munsters (1964-1966)
- Send Me No Flowers (1964) Seen in the background, near the end of the film
- The Ghost and Mr. Chicken (1966) starring Don Knotts
- Dragnet (1967-1970), visible in the 1968 episodes"The Big Clan" and "The Big Investigation"
- The Ballad of Josie (1967)
- Coogan's Bluff (1968)
- Kolchak: The Night Stalker "The Ripper" episode (1974)
- It Happened One Christmas (1977) (TV movie)
- Shirley (TV series) (1979), appearing as the house exterior
- The Incredible Hulk (1978-1982), as a backdrop in some episodes
- Dragnet (1987) as Dan Aykroyd's grandmother's house
- The 'Burbs (1989) as Ricky Butler's house
- Get a Life (1990-1992), as the backdrop at the end of the opening credits of every episode
- Murder, She Wrote (1984-1996), appearing as a sorority house in the season 5 episode "Alma Murder" (1989); “The Witch's Curse” (1992)
- Quantum Leap, TV Series, in the 1991 season 3 episode 16 "Southern Comforts"
- Everybody loves Raymond (1996-2005), in Season 3 Episode 5 (1999) "The Getaway" as a bed and breakfast
- Desperate Housewives (2004-2012), prominently featured in the second season (2005) as the Applewhite house, with major modifications as discussed above

== Legacy ==
=== Texas homage ===
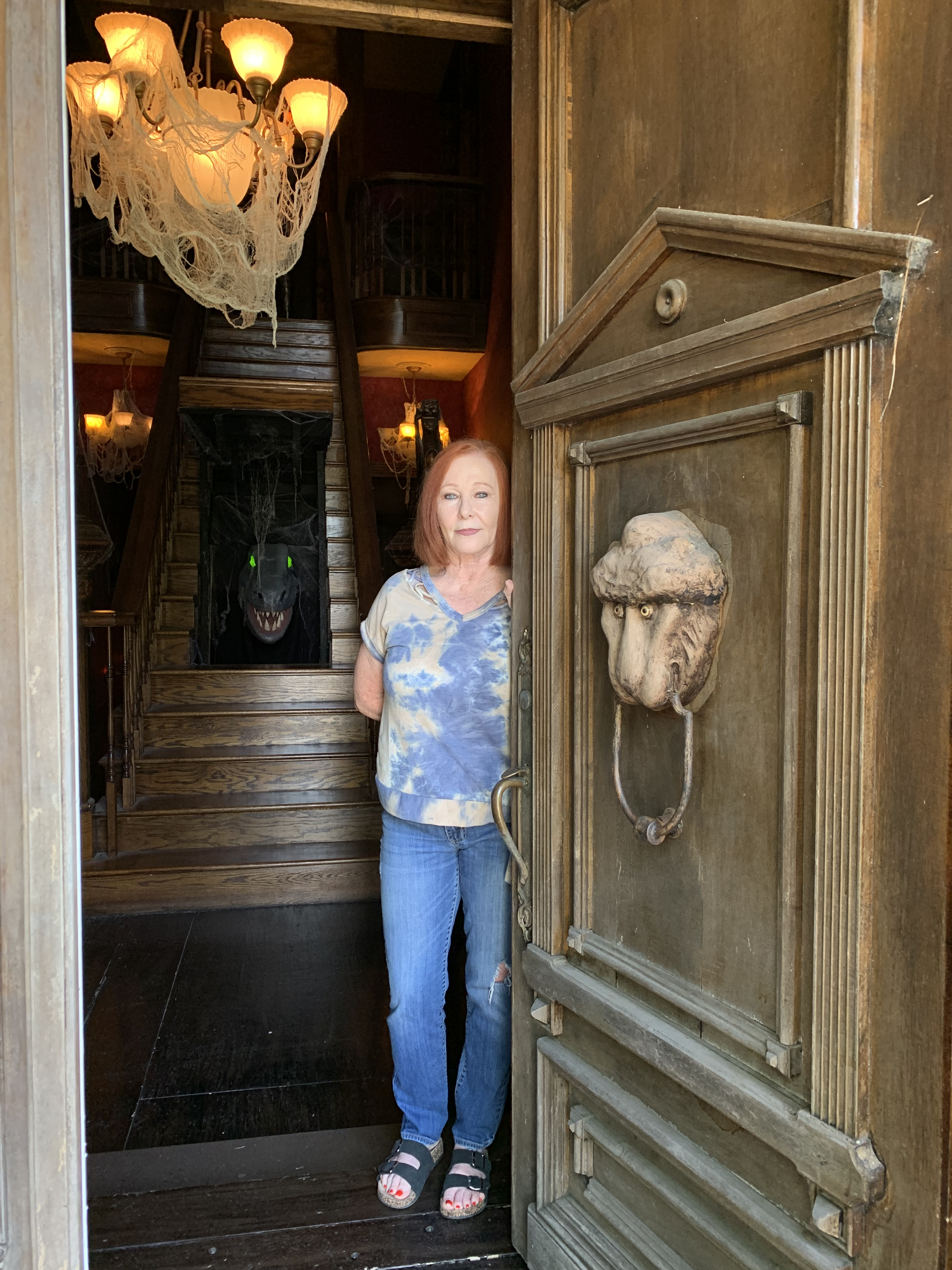
Owner Sandra McKee at the entrance to Munster Mansion replica in Waxahachie, Texas. Image uploaded with express permission of Sandra McKee.

In the spring of 2001, Sandra and Charles McKee of Waxahachie, Texas, began construction of a fully livable "re-creation" of the Munster home, inside and out. With initial construction completed in 2002, cast alumni Al Lewis and Butch Patrick appeared at the public grand opening. Lewis exclaimed, with tears in his eyes, "This brings back warm memories." The house comes equipped with a grand staircase (which opens up to reveal Spot), a rotating suit of armor, trap doors, secret passages, Grandpa's electric chair, a pipe organ, the raven cuckoo clock, a crooked bat weather vane on the roof and even a dungeon complete with trap door.

Since then, the McKees have opened their private home to the public for two nights each year on the weekend of Halloween. Since the death of Lewis, Pat Priest has returned to appear multiple times. The Munster Mansion Halloween Bash each year selects a local charity and donates all proceeds from the event.

=== Model kit ===
While popular model-maker AURORA offered a fanciful "Munsters Living Room" plastic model kit in 1/16 scale in the 1960s, only recently has a model of the house been made available. In 2012, model-maker Moebius announced that it was manufacturing a styrene model kit of the house as it appeared on the original series, in HO-scale, available as both a standard kit and a limited edition "ghostly green" kit.

== See also ==
- 1313 Mockingbird Lane, an American garage rock band
