= Blotto (band) =

American rock band

Blotto was an American rock band from Albany, New York, known for mixing music and humor. They formed in 1978 from the Star Spangled Washboard Band, a comedy jug band whom The New York Times described as "reminiscent of collision between the Earl Scruggs Review and the Three Stooges." Blotto's music combined new wave and soul/R&B with comedic themes.

== History ==
The band began as a pickup group in Saratoga Springs at a club then known as 17 Maple Ave. (later The Metro), with three Washboard Band alumni (who took the stage names Bowtie Blotto, Sergeant Blotto, and Broadway Blotto), plus a drummer and a bassist (Lee Harvey Blotto, and Cheese Blotto).

They were joined by Blanche Blotto, who contributed vocals and keyboards and inspired the band's drumhead lady logo. They played in the New York City area at clubs such as The Ritz, SNAFU, Eighty-Eight, and My Father's Place. DJ Vin Scelsa of WNEW-FM picked up on their initial recording of "I Wanna Be a Lifeguard," which soon became the theme song of the Jones Beach Lifeguards. Their songs were played on the Dr. Demento Show, and they appeared on television's Uncle Floyd Show. They toured frequently and were popular primarily in the northeastern United States, especially among college students.

After releasing two EPs on their own Blotto Records label, they produced an early music video for "I Wanna Be a Lifeguard" with video production students at SUNY Albany. The video was played on MTV's very first day on the air in 1981 and continued in frequent rotation. This exposure helped the band produce their album Combo Akimbo, which was released with assistance from Peter Pan Records, as well as a "Video 45" on VHS from Sony with three videos of Blotto songs that also received exposure from airplay on MTV, including "Metalhead," with Donald "Buck Dharma" Roeser from Blue Öyster Cult on lead guitar. Blotto worked with producer Bob Clearmountain on one song on the album. North Lake Sound Chief Engineer, Chris Cassone, produced and engineered the rest of Combo Akimbo.

The group disbanded in 1984 with the players pursuing more profitable interests. Drummer Lee Harvey Blotto (Paul Rapp) graduated from Albany Law School, became an attorney and continued to play with the band as "F. Lee Harvey Blotto" (a pun on the names of famous lawyer F. Lee Bailey and JFK assassin Lee Harvey Oswald). Keyboardist and vocalist "Blanche Blotto" (Helena Binder) went on to direct plays and operas.

All of Blotto's studio recordings (with one exception, the song "Bud ... Is After Us") were reissued on a 1994 compact disc compilation, Collected Works. In 1999, the band released Then More Than Ever, a CD comprising previously unreleased live concert recordings, excerpts from a 1982 appearance on the "BBC College Concert" radio series, and tracks recorded for the never-completed follow-up album to Combo Akimbo.

The band reunited for occasional concerts in the Albany area, including an appearance at the 2008 4th of July celebration at Empire State Plaza, and several shows in 2011 at local festivals. On August 6, 2015, the band opened for Blue Öyster Cult at an "Alive at Five" concert in Albany.

Bassist "Cheese Blotto" (Keith Stephenson) died suddenly in October 1999 of cardiomyopathy brought on by a liver condition. Founding member and lead vocalist Sergeant Blotto (real name Greg Haymes) died on April 10, 2019.

HELLO! MY NAME IS BLOTTO THE MOVIE!, a 105-minute documentary directed by Rob Lichter, is scheduled for release in the summer of 2025.

== Members ==
Group members went by pseudonyms on their recordings and in performance. The members of the band were:

- Paul Jossman, aka "Bowtie Blotto" (guitar, vocals).
- Bill Polchinski, aka "Broadway Blotto" (guitar, vocals).
- Keith Stephenson, aka "Cheese Blotto" (bass guitar) 1956–1999.
- Greg Haymes, aka "Sergeant Blotto" ("Sarge") (vocals, percussion; director, Blotto Graphic Arts Dept.)
- Paul Rapp, aka "Lee Harvey Blotto" (drums).
- Helena Binder, aka "Blanche Blotto" (keyboards, vocals; 1978-1980).

=== Other members ===
- Johnny Blotten (drums; 1978–1979)
- Scott Blott (sax; 1978)
- Chevrolet Blotto (vocals and keyboards; 1980–1981)
- Ink Blotto (roadie; 1980–1982) aka Jay Bloomrosen
- Phil Auteliblotto (guitar; 1990-1991)
- Juan Pablo Blotto (1990–1995)
- Riff Chord Blotto (lead guitar; 1979-1980)
- Staccato Blotto (Rob Sabino - keyboards 1980)

== Discography ==
=== Original releases 1979-83 ===
- Hello! My Name is Blotto. What's Yours? (EP, Blotto Records) (1979-80)
- Across and Down (EP, Blotto Records) (1980)
- "When the Second Feature Starts" / "The B Side" (Single, Blotto Records) (1981)
- Metalhead (Sony Video 45, VHS) (1982)
- Combo Akimbo (LP, Blotto Records) (1982)
- "Metal Head" / "The Blotto Story" (12" Maxi Single, Attic Records, Canada) (1983)
- "I Quit" / "It's Not You" (Single, Attic Records, Canada) (1983)

=== Compilations ===
- Blotto (Canadian compilation) (LP, Attic Records, Canada) (1984)
- I Wanna Be A Lifeguard (LP, Performance Records) (1988)
- Collected Works* (CD, One Way Records) (1992)
- Then More Than Ever (CD, One Way Records) (1999) (previously unreleased tracks)
- Blotto - Play Something Good! The Definitive Video History (2005)

=== Other appearances ===
In addition to their inclusion on the CD Collected Works and Then More Than Ever:

- Blotto's cover version of Lou Christie's "Lightnin' Strikes" appears on the compilation LP Hudson Rock: Fifteen Bands from Albany, new York (MCE Records, 1982)
- "Metal Head" appears on the compilation LP Metal For Breakfast (Attic Records, Canada, 1984)
- "Cosmic Love Songs" appears on the compilation CD Rock 'N Relief (Dish-Dawg Records, 2000)
- "I Wanna Be A Lifeguard" appears on the following compilation albums:
  - Zoo's Next: The WMMR Morning Zoo Album (Comedy Spotlight Records, 1986)
  - Celebrating 15 Years With Attic (Attic Records (Canada), 1988)
  - 25: Metroland Retrospective (Metroland. 2004)
