= The Cast of Beatlemania =

Beatles' tribute band

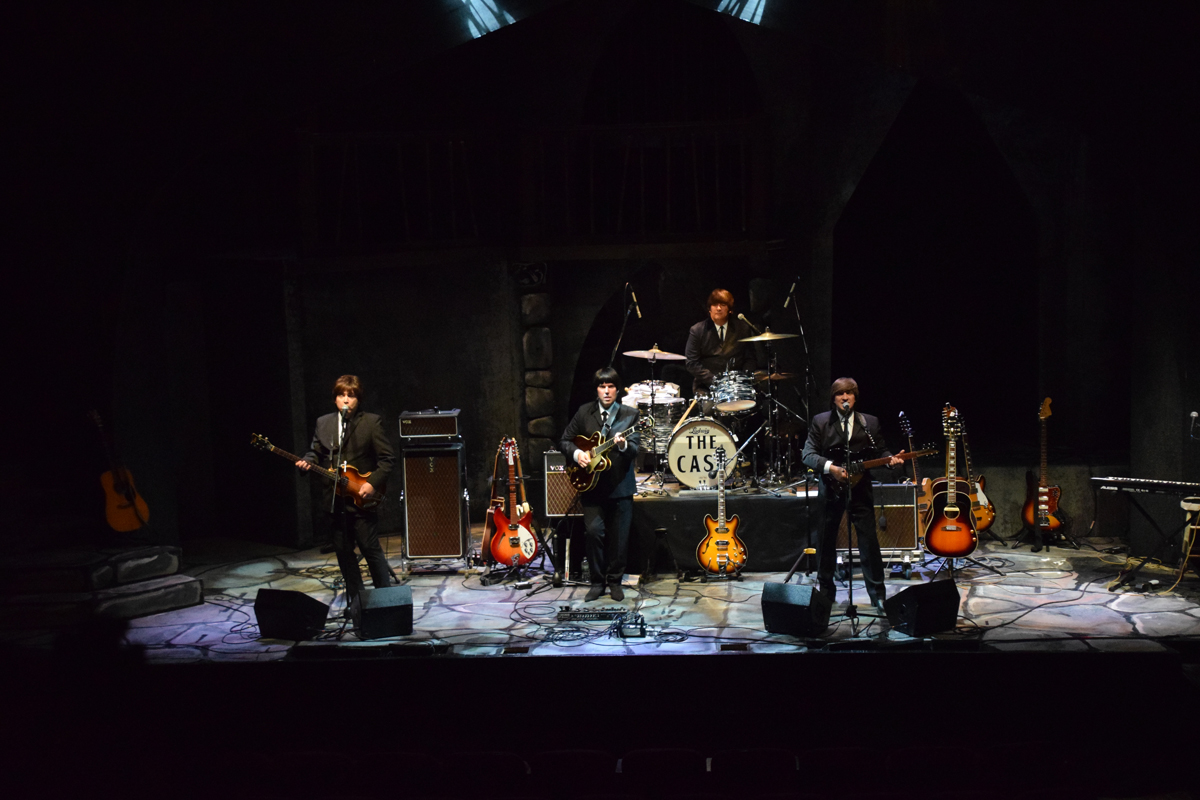

Background information
- Origin: New England, United States
- Occupation: Beatles Tribute Band
- Years active: 1980–present
- Members: Carlo Cantamessa; Lenie Colacino; John Delgado; Larry Hochman; Monroe Quinn
- Past members: Rich Gomez Mitch Weissman, Leslie Fradkin, Joe Pecorino, Louis Colucci, Jimmy Pou, Tom Teeley, Bob Miller, Alan LeBoeuf, Marty Feier, P.M. Howard, Jim Filgate and Mark Templeton.
- Website: Moptops.com

The Cast of Beatlemania (shortened to The Cast) is an American Beatles tribute band formed in 1980. The group was founded by Lenie Colacino, a former cast member of the 1977 Broadway hit musical Beatlemania, and are one of the longest-running Beatles tribute acts. The group has performed in all 48 contiguous U.S. states, and over twenty other countries, including Canada, England, Mexico, Central and South America, Brazil and Japan.

The Cast recreates the sights and sounds of The Beatles from an era of the 1960s when the world was engulfed in the throes of Beatlemania. Three different costumes coincide with the changing music and times during their existence.

== History ==
The Cast was individually selected from hundreds of musicians who auditioned from all over the U.S. for the Broadway show, Beatlemania.

The Cast originally started when the members of the ending Broadway show were let go as the show came to a conclusion in late 1979. Those four members (Lenie Colacino, Richie Gomez, Mike Palaikis and Bob Forte) started The Cast and the same group name has been in existence since the early 1980s.

This current incarnation of the show is the most popular version since inception, having retained the same members for the longest period of time.

== Concept ==
The concept of Beatlemania was to put four people up on stage that look, act and sound like The Beatles; people that could actually play The Beatles music in such a way that you would think you’re watching The Beatles but in a very small time span of two hours, you would get the entire era of The Beatles from 1964-1969. The Cast of Beatlemania originated out of the Broadway show Beatlemania, but we took it one step further where we try to look, act and sound like The Beatles as you remember them, but the sound is the album. The Broadway show had the video that ran behind you, you had slides that ran and it was only these songs, you did this and you said that and you were here at a certain time. We don’t do that; we have a whole interaction with the crowd and we interact with each other, but when it comes to the actual music, I want you to sit there and feel as if you’re hearing the record live… We want people to go, 'Wow, those guys were great and the music was spot on.' ... Night after night it sounds exactly like the record but it’s a live format.

— Taken from a live radio interview with Carlo Cantamessa

== Members ==
The current members are:

Carlo Cantamessa (as John Lennon) — rhythm guitar, bass guitar, piano, lead vocal

The manager of the band.

Lenie Colacino (as Paul McCartney) — bass guitar, piano, lead vocal

Founder of The Cast and the first left-handed member of the original Broadway production of Beatlemania
Voices of the “Beetles” on the Nickelodeon's Wonder Pets

Monroe Quinn (as George Harrison) — lead guitar, lead vocal

Previously has performed with Billy Preston, Micky Dolenz of The Monkees, Peter Noone of Herman's Hermits, Neil Innes, Joey Molland of Badfinger, and Denny Laine from Wings and The Moody Blues.

John Delgado (as Ringo Starr) — drums, percussion, lead vocal

Larry Hochman — keyboards, musical director, arranger

== Songs ==
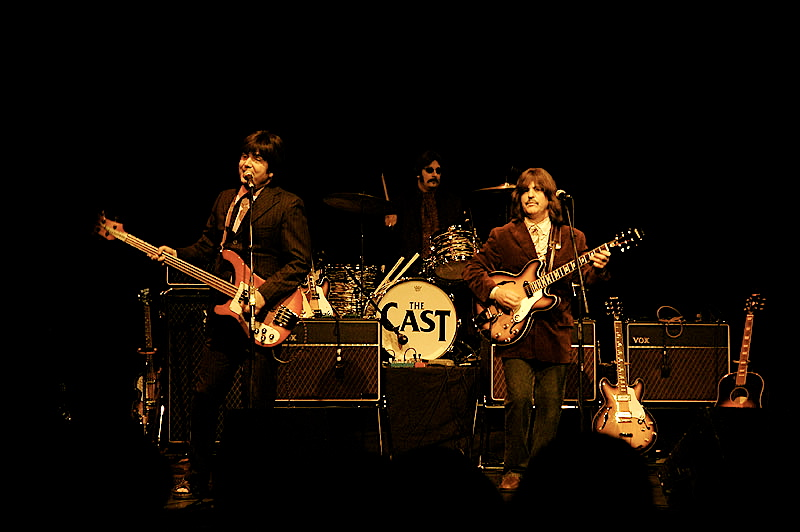
Lenie Colacino (as Paul McCartney) and Jim Filgate (as George Harrison)

Carlo Cantamessa as John Lennon

Act I

- "I Want to Hold Your Hand"
- "Yesterday"
- "I Saw Her Standing There"
- "Act Naturally"
- "This Boy"
- "Lose That Girl"
- "From Me to You"
- "Help!"
- "Please Please Me"
- "In My Life"
- "All My Loving"
- "Nowhere Man"
- "A Hard Days Night"
- "I Feel Fine"
- "Happy Just to Dance"
- "Day Tripper"
- "I Call Your Name"
- "Twist & Shout"

Act II

- "Sgt. Pepper's Lonely Hearts Club Band"
- "Back in USSR"
- "With a Little Help From My Friends"
- "Birthday"
- "Lucy in the Sky With Diamonds"
- "Something"
- "Strawberry Fields Forever"
- "Penny Lane"
- "I Am the Walrus"
- "Lady Madonna"
- "Taxman"
- "Hey Jude"
- "While my Guitar Gently Weeps"
- "Here Comes the Sun"
- "Got to Get You into My Life"
- "Get Back"
- "Come Together"
- "Revolution"

== See also ==
- Beatlemania
