= Starr Labs =

- Industry: Musical instruments
- Founded: 1986
- Founder: Harvey Starr
- Headquarters: San Diego, CA, USA
- Area served: Global
- Products: Ztar, RockController
- Website: www.starrlabs.com

Starr Labs is a musical instrument manufacturer founded in 1986 in San Diego, California, by musician and inventor Harvey Starr. He was previously the singer and guitarist for the 1960s Manchester-based band The Richard Kent Style of Manchester.

The company manufactures a diverse product line of MIDI (Musical Instrument Digital Interface) interactive guitars, keyboards, percussion and unique music devices for professional musicians, semi-pro musicians, and music students. Current products include: Ztars keyboards guitar electronics.

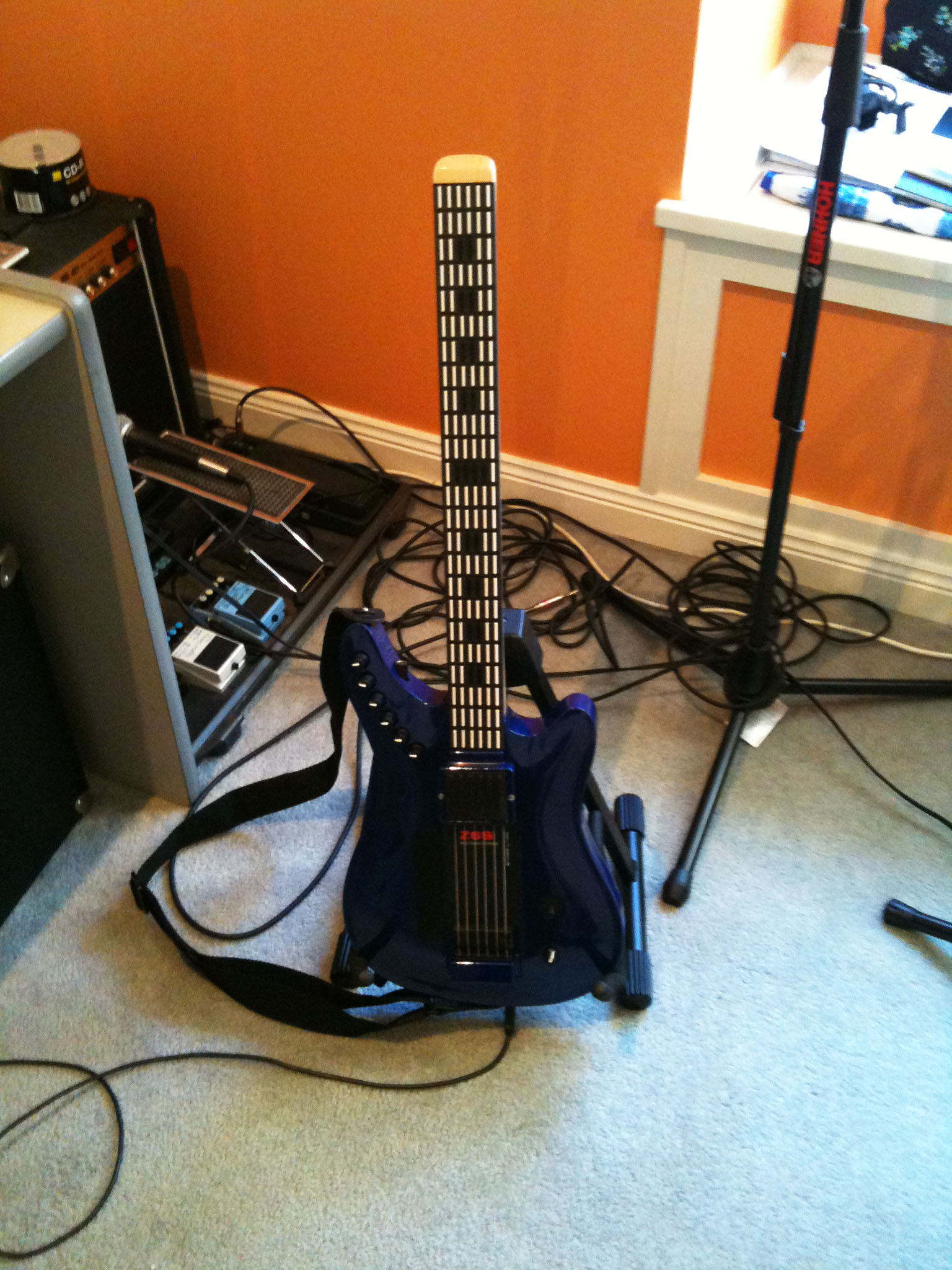
Starr Labs Ztar Z6 in a home studio.

The company also offers custom versions of their products for professional musicians. The guitar products range from the simple RockController, a six-string, full-fretted neck controller for music-based video games to their high-end Z6S.
