= Beatlemania (musical) =

1977 Broadway musical revue

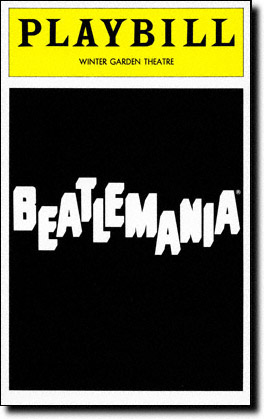
- Broadway Playbill cover
- Music: The Beatles
- Lyrics: The Beatles
- Book: Bob Gill, Robert Rabinowitz, Lynda Obst
- Basis: The life and music of the Beatles
- Productions: 1977 Broadway

Beatlemania was a Broadway musical revue focused on the music of the Beatles as it related to the events and changing attitudes of the tumultuous 1960s. A "rockumentary," advertised as "Not the Beatles, but an incredible simulation," it ran from May 1977 to October 1979 for a total of 1,006 performances.

== Synopsis ==
Beatlemania took the form of a roughly chronological history of the Beatles via their music. A total of 29 songs were performed during the show. Other than some unscripted onstage banter, there was very little dialogue during the production, which consisted mostly of exact re-enactments of the Beatles' music. The multimedia production was notable for its extensive use of backdrops, projected images on multiple screens, film, newspaper headlines, and video footage to evoke the 1960s and iconic Beatle moments.

== Productions ==
Originally conceived and produced by Steve Leber and David Krebs, Beatlemania debuted in Boston at the Colonial Theatre in April 1977. It premiered on Broadway at the Winter Garden Theatre on May 31, 1977 (after previewing since May 26 — although no critics were invited), with cast members Joe Pecorino (rhythm guitar, John), Mitch Weissman (bass guitar, Paul), Les Fradkin (lead guitar, George), and Justin McNeill (drums, Ringo) along with an alternating cast: Randy Clark "John", Reed Kailing "Paul", P.M. Howard "George", and Bobby Taylor "Ringo".

Quickly achieving sellout status without ever having an official "opening night", Beatlemania saw great success and coverage in Time, People, Us, Newsweek, and Rolling Stone. For the first six months, every ticket for the show was sold out.

The production was nominated for the 1978 Tony Award for Best Lighting Design by designer Jules Fisher. Sound design by Abe Jacob.

The Broadway show ran until October 17, 1979, for a total of 1006 performances; grossing more than $40 million. During its New York run, the show moved to the Lunt-Fontanne Theatre and finally the Palace Theatre.

As the show expanded, over 50 cast members formed 10 "bunks" (or casts of a single set of four). As the New York show continued its run, shows were opened in Los Angeles, Chicago, Cincinnati, and London. At its peak, Beatlemania had limited-engagements in many more cities in the U.S. and abroad.

After closing on Broadway, the Beatlemania Bus and Truck Tour began, running until 1983 and touring across the United States and worldwide. Short-term tours of Australia, Europe, Asia, and Africa were produced after 1982.

A 1986 decision in a lawsuit by the Beatles production company Apple Corps officially ended the show for a period of time, but subsequent revival tours were still produced under such titles as Beatlemania: Yesterday and Today and Beatlemania Now.

== Beatlemania: The Album ==
In 1978, Beatlemania released a self-titled original cast album of the show which included contributions from the first and second cast of performers from the show (as well as five additional off-stage musicians — keyboards, violin, cello, sax/flute/recorder, trumpet/piccolo trumpet and oboe). Released on Arista Records in 1978, the album received warm audience reaction, even placing on the Billboard 200 for several weeks, before falling into obscurity.

Tracks from the album included most but not all of the original show's song list, and several of the tracks were either re-recorded entirely or partially re-recorded in the studio. Original cast members that appear on the album include Mitch Weissman, Joe Pecorino, Les Fradkin, Justin McNeill, Randy Clark, Reed Kailing, P. M. Howard, and Bobby Taylor.

== Beatlemania: The Movie ==
After three years of production, USA Video Productions took an interest in making a film version of the Beatlemania stage show. After a brief contract negotiation, Beatlemania: The Movie began production in late 1980 (shortly before the murder of John Lennon). Directed by Joseph Manduke, the film's cast featured Mitch Weissman (bass guitar; "Paul"), David Leon (rhythm guitar; "John"), Tom Teeley (lead guitar; "George"), and Ralph Castelli (drums; "Ringo").

Beatlemania: The Movie was released in the summer of 1981 and received negative reviews. Janet Maslin of The New York Times, "Beatlemania was a horror on the stage, and it's even more of a horror at close range, where the seams really show. This isn't a loving impersonation, or even an honest one. It's cheap, disingenuous and loathsome." Jonathan Rosenbaum of the Chicago Reader wrote, "My idea of hell is being forced at gunpoint to resee this ... atrocity, ... based on a terrible stage musical." Other observers criticized the film for being too artsy and not worthy of being associated with the stageshow; plans for a follow-up film were immediately cancelled.

== Apple Corps lawsuit ==
In 1979, Apple Corps sued show creator Steve Leber and Beatlemania's producers, alleging that Apple Corps owned various publicity rights and trademarks, and Leber and others "appropriated to themselves" the value of those trademarks and the Beatles' goodwill and fame without paying for it. In 1986, Los Angeles Superior Court judge Paul Breckenridge found in favor of Apple Corps, and ordered Leber and Beatlemania Inc. to pay Apple $5.6 million, plus 7% interest from September 1979. He also found that Apple was entitled to a court order barring the further unconsented use or exploitation of the Beatles, and that Beatlemania's actions "amounted to virtually a complete appropriation of the Beatles' persona" without their consent. The judge also found that Ely Landau and the This Is The Week That Was Beatlemania Company, which produced the Beatlemania film, were liable for $2 million and 7% interest, also payable to Apple Corps.

== Music ==
The musical numbers in the show (all written by Lennon–McCartney), based on the Broadway opening, were:

Act 1

- "I Want to Hold Your Hand"
- "She Loves You"
- "Help!"
- "If I Fell"
- "Can't Buy Me Love"
- "Day Tripper"
- "Yesterday"
- "Eleanor Rigby"
- "We Can Work It Out"
- "Nowhere Man"
- "A Day in the Life"
- "Penny Lane"
- "Strawberry Fields Forever"
- "Magical Mystery Tour"
- "Lucy in the Sky with Diamonds"

Act 2

- "Lady Madonna"
- "The Fool on the Hill"
- "Got to Get You into My Life"
- "Michelle"
- "Get Back"
- "Come Together"
- "With a Little Help from My Friends"
- "All You Need Is Love"
- "Revolution"
- "Helter Skelter"
- "Hey Jude"
- "I Am the Walrus"
- "The Long and Winding Road"
- "Let It Be"

== Cast members ==
Because of the vocal strain (especially for "Paul") involved in doing 8 or more shows per week, each production utilized two casts or "Bunks," as they were dubbed by musical director Sandy Yaguda (after they had dubbed him "Camp Counselor"). The Original Broadway production featured Bunk 1: Mitch Weissman, Joe Pecorino, Les Fradkin and Justin McNeill. and Bunk 2: Randy Clark, Reed Kailing, P.M. Howard, and Bobby Taylor. Subsequent cast members were added as the show expanded with several touring casts. Casts and casting became independent after 1984 as revival and current casts tour under many different Beatle-related nomenclatures. (It is common practice for other Beatles tribute bands to promote themselves falsely as "Original Broadway Cast".)

=== John Lennon ===
- Joe Pecorino
- Randy Clark — also played "John" with "RAIN: a Tribute to The Beatles", "Imagine: a Tribute to John Lennon" (with members of the Elephant's Memory/Plastic Ono bands), and "Legends In Concert" in Las Vegas and on Broadway
- Michael Palaikis (deceased)
- David Leon — also played with Rain: A Tribute to the Beatles
- Caspar McCloud (later swapped roles with Marshall Crenshaw)
- Marshall Crenshaw — performed in Hollywood and San Francisco productions as well as the touring production
- Mark Vaccacio (deceased)
- Peter McGann
- Bob Williford
- Robert Wirth
- Jim Riddle (deceased)
- Steve Landes — currently a member of Rain: A Tribute to the Beatles
- Joe Palermo — currently a member of Adamsapple A tribute to the Beatles

=== Paul McCartney ===
- Mitch Weissman
- Reed Kailing
- Lenie Colacino
- Alan LeBoeuf — also played with Rain: A Tribute to the Beatles, and currently playing with “Beatlemania Again!”.
- Glen Burtnick
- Tony Kishman
- Joey Curatolo — currently a member of Rain: A Tribute to the Beatles
- Jim Odom
- Bobby Grant
- Don Linares
- Jim Cushing
- John Redgate
- Billy J. Ray

=== George Harrison ===
- Les Fradkin
- P. M. Howard
- Tom Teeley — also played with Rain: A Tribute to the Beatles and with Marshall Crenshaw of Beatlemania
- Rob Laufer
- Bobby Diebold
- Richie Gomez
- Jimmy Pou — currently a member of Rain: A Tribute to the Beatles, formerly with “1964-The Tribute“.
- Bob Miller - formerly with “1964-The Tribute”
- Peter Santora
- Chris Gavin
- Joe Bithorn — currently a member of Rain: A Tribute to the Beatles
- Richi Ray

=== Ringo Starr ===
- Justin McNeill
- Bobby Taylor — also played with "RAIN: A Tribute to The Beatles"
- Bennett Gale
- Louie Colucci
- Ralph Castelli — currently a member of Rain: A Tribute to the Beatles
- Jake Ehrenreich
- Sy Goraieb
- Bobby Forte
- Al Sapienza
- Rick Bloom — replaced Justin McNeil in September 1978
- Phil LoMedico
- Gemma Press
- Cho Paquet
- Neil Floyd (referred to as the unknown Bunk 1 Ringo) left in May 1977 to pursue a tour with Blue Sky Records recording artist Rick Derringer.

== Awards and nominations ==
=== Original Broadway production ===
Year	Award Ceremony	Category	Nominee	Result
1977	Tony Award	Best Lighting Design (Play or Musical)	Jules Fisher	Nominated

Year	Award Ceremony	Category	Nominee	Result
1979	Grammy Award	Best Musical Theater Album	Kenny Laguna & Sandy Yaguda	Nominated

== See also ==
- The Cast of Beatlemania
