= Volo Museum =

Museum in Volo, Illinois

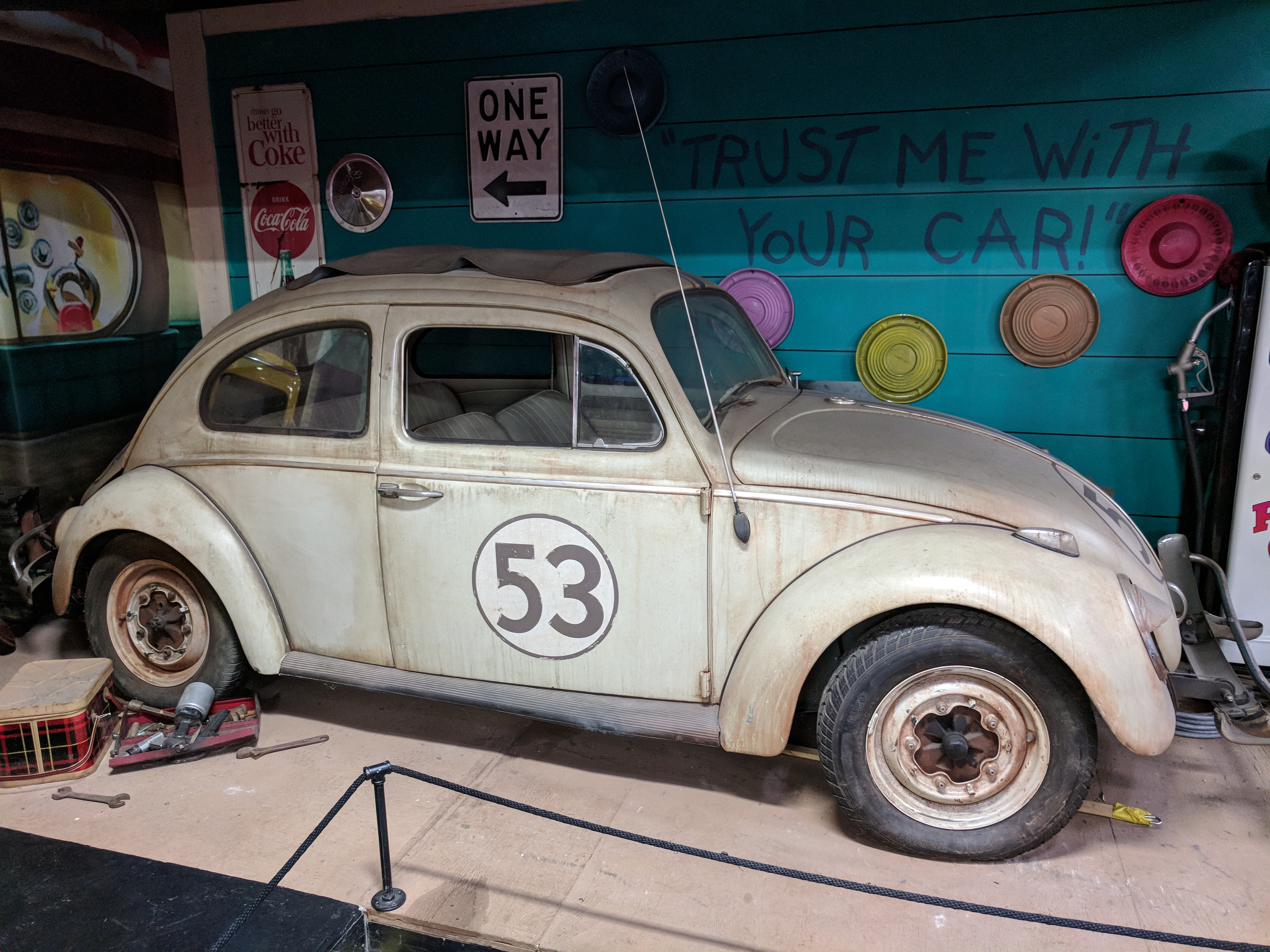
- Herbie car on display at Volo Auto Museum, 2017
- Established: 1960
- Location: 27582 Volo Village Road; Volo, Illinois, United States
- Coordinates: 42.326741°N 88.171338°W
- Website: volofun.com/volo-museum

Established in 1960 by the Grams family, the Volo Museum (formerly the Volo Auto Museum) is an automotive museum and collector car dealer in the Chicago suburb of Volo, Illinois, US. The museum contains an exhibit of collectors' autos from vintage to modern classics, with the main focus being American cars of the 1950–1980 period, over 50 famous TV and movie cars, cars previously owned by the rich and famous, animatronics from ShowBiz Pizza Place and Chuck E. Cheese's Pizza Time Theatre, and a large array of Disney and Looney Tunes displays. Unique to this museum is that many of the vehicles on display (in five large buildings) are for sale. One of 50 exhibits on the 75-acre museum campus is a military-oriented "Armed Forces Exhibit", added in the late 2000s. Of the 4 antique malls on the museum grounds, one is reported to be haunted and has become a magnet for ghost hunters and sightings and an episode of the TV show Ghost Lab was filmed here. The museum has its own TV series on History called Volo, House of Cars beginning in 2017.

== Notable exhibits ==
The museum features cars (some original and many replicas) from notable television shows and movies. These include:

- KITT from Knight Rider
- Super Pursuit KITT from Knight Rider TV show
- The Rock-afire Explosion show from Showbiz Pizza Place
- Ecto-1 from Ghostbusters
- Bonnie and Clyde movie death car
- Dominic Toretto's Dodge Charger hero car from The Fast and The Furious
- Ice Charger from The Fate of the Furious
- Nostromo Survey Buggy from the film Alien
- Aston Martin Vanquish from the James Bond film Die Another Day
- Bluesmobile from The Blues Brothers
- General Lee from The Dukes of Hazzard television show
- DeLorean replica from Back to the Future
- Hoverboard replica from Back to the Future Part II
- Eleanor from Gone in 60 Seconds
- Interceptor from the film Mad Max
- Black Beauty from The Green Hornet
- Greased Lightning car
- Hell Cycle from Ghost Rider
- DRAG-U-LA replica from The Munsters - its replica is on display at the Hollywood Star Cars Museum in Gatlinburg, Tennessee
- Munster Koach from The Munsters
- Christine from Christine
- Mystery Machine van replica from Scooby-Doo
- George Barris Batmobile of TV's Batman
- 18-wheel tractor-trailer (Trailer is labeled "(S)Laughter is the best medicine") driven by the Joker in The Dark Knight
- Batmobile from Batman
- Ferrari Daytona original replica driven by Don Johnson in Miami Vice
- Bumblebee from the Transformers movie
- Beverly Hillbillies jalopy
- Arnold's Hearse from the film Terminator 3: Rise of the Machines
- Michael Andretti's Indy 500 race car
- Lightning McQueen from the film Cars
- Mater from the film Cars
- The Super Luxurious Omnidirectional Whatchamajigger from the Mike Myers Cat in the Hat movie
- Speed Racer's Mach 5
- SpongeBob's Boatmobile
- Teenage Mutant Ninja Turtles' van
- The Flintstones Flintmobile
- Bugs Bunny's Carrot car
- Truckasaurus Dinosaur truck
- Cinderella's coach
- Pee Wee Herman's bike from the film Pee-wee's Big Adventure
- Herbie the Love Bug from the film Herbie: Fully Loaded
- Tribute to Charlie Chaplin car
- Roller Skate car
- Piano car
- Soul Train car
- Disney omnibus parade vehicle from Epcot within Walt Disney World
- AWVR 777 locomotive cab prop from Unstoppable
- Fillmore and Western Railway GP35 prop locomotive (built on the chassis of a semi truck) from Inception
- Jupiter locomotive and coaches from Disney's The Lone Ranger
- Wagon Queen Family Truckster replica from National Lampoon's Vacation

Some of the vehicles referred to by the museum as "star cars" are available for purchase.

== See also ==
- Dezerland Park Orlando
