= Dick Dean =

American automobile designer (1933–2008)

Dick Dean (February 9, 1933 – July 10, 2008), born Richard Dean Sawitskas [Sa-WITS-kas], was an American automobile designer and builder of custom cars.

== Biography ==
Born in Wyandotte, Michigan, 20 miles south of Detroit, the heart of the automotive world, Dean studied art and drafting at Theodore Roosevelt High School and also attended the Ford Trade School because his life's ambition was to be a model-maker at Ford Motor Company. His father, Vic, owned a Nash dealership and Dean worked in the body repair shop. He learned the technical aspects of auto body repair, but was frustrated with the lack of creativity.

Dean recalled, "Dad's body men could remove and replace fenders, bumpers and anything that unbolted, but little else. He used this outside fellow, who owned a tin building with a dirt floor, to do the serious repair that called for replacing quarter-panels and lead work, and his name was Bill Hines. Bill let me hang around and watch him work, and he taught me how to work lead and do other neat custom tricks." Dean mastered pin striping and began earning extra cash. He also started chopping tops, which very few people were doing at the time. He was a member of the Down River Modified car club. After high school, he went to Pasadena, California and studied at the Art Center College of Design under famous automotive designer Strother MacMinn.

Dean entered the Air Force and served in the Korean War as a radio operator until his Honorable Discharge in 1956. In 1954 Dean married Jeanne Schrader. They had met in high school and spent the rest of their lives together. Returning to Michigan after the Air Force, he worked at a steel mill job until a deadly accident scared him away. He then rented a little two-stall shop and started customizing on his own. South End Kustom was a struggle to keep in business, but he held on and his luck changed. It was 1959 at the Detroit Autorama when he first met George Barris.

Dean related, "I built and entered an orange-and-white '57 Ford hardtop that I called 'Orange Peel.' The custom had neat little tricks that George liked, such as the stacked taillight lenses and the front grille treatment. Barris said, 'If you ever get to L.A., I'll give you a job.' We went to L.A. in [April 1960], and true to his word, George gave me a job at $175 a week, and there was plenty of work to do."

The 1959 Autorama car show was also when he got his famous nickname. The show announcer couldn't pronounce his last name and asked for his middle name. Then he shortened ‘Richard’ to ‘Dick’ and announced him as ‘Dick Dean,’ which became his permanent trade name.

In Los Angeles during the early 1960s, Dean augmented his show car work by building chassis frames and aerodynamic bodies for dragsters and cars intent on setting world land speed records. These included the Goldenrod and Challenger for Mickey Thompson. Dean occasionally slid himself behind the wheel at Lions Drag Strip.

In 1960, Jack Ryan of Mattel toys, an avid car buff, tapped Dean to customize His/Hers Studebakers. With a young family and plenty of creativity in his grasp, Dean then worked for Ryan at Mattel for several years, designing such notable toys as "Blaze the Wonder Horse," and the V-RROOM! X-15 tricycle with rear wheel steering.

In 1964 George Barris asked Dean to run the famous Barris Kustom City. His work with Barris included many notable cars, including the Surf Woody (designed by Tom Daniel), the X-PAK 400 floating air fan car, and cars for television shows such as the Munster Koach and Dragula for The Munsters, and cars for Beverly Hillbillies and Mannix. He collaborated with Dean Jeffries in 1966 on several TV cars, including Black Beauty for The Green Hornet and the Monkeemobile for The Monkees.

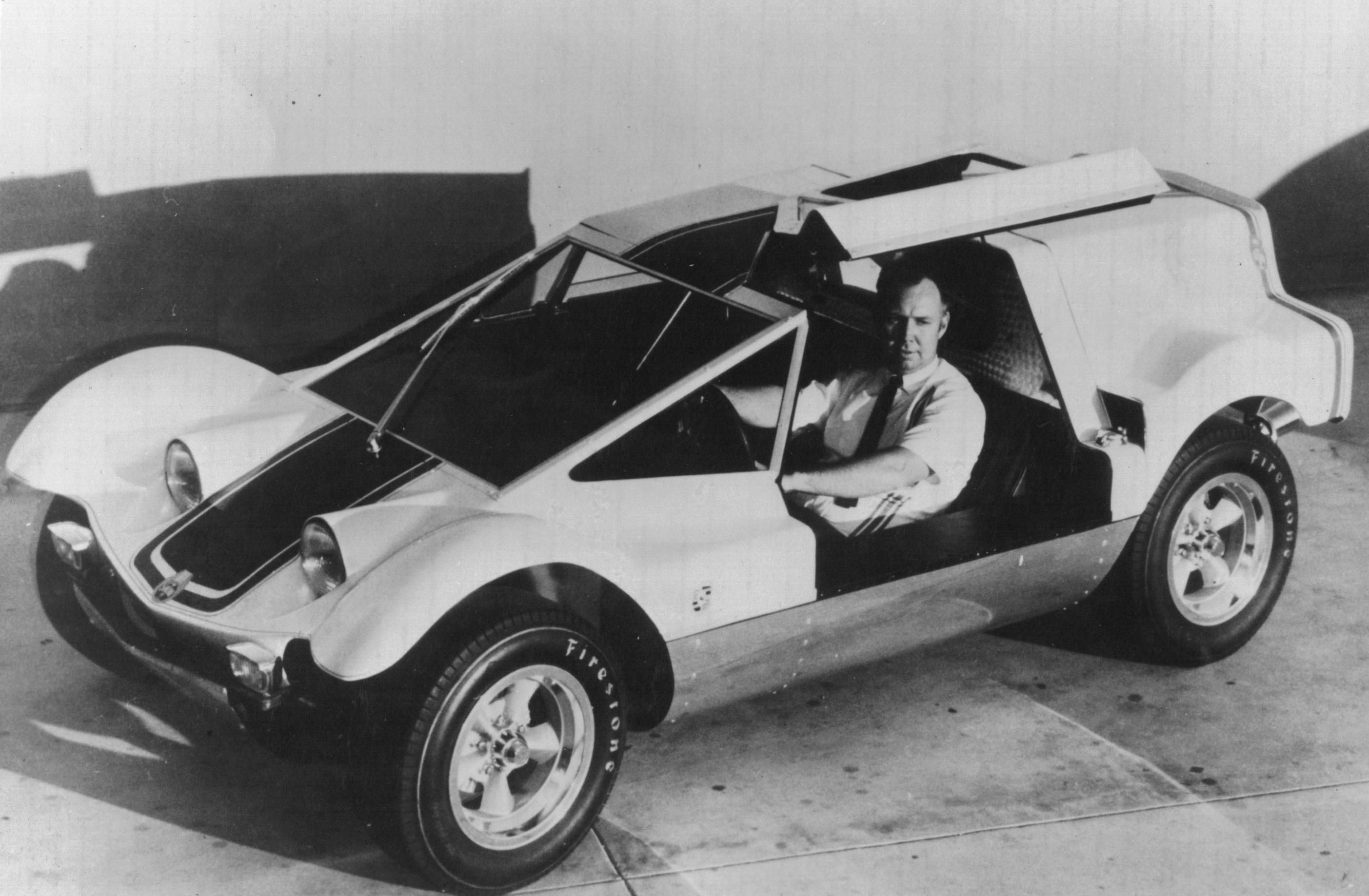
Dick Dean (c. 1969) in his car, Shalako.

In the later 1960s, Dean built many dune buggies on shortened Volkswagen Beetle chassis with fiberglass Meyers Manx bodies. Capitalizing on this premise, in 1968-69 Dean created his own body for a shortened Volkswagen chassis, the Shalako. The first car had an aluminum skin, but production models were built with fiberglass bodies. The low-slung two seater featured gull wing doors and a low, flat windshield. A later model, the Shala-Vette, had a longer nose and conventional doors. Model car manufacturer MPC produced 1/20 scale models of the Shalako and Shala-Vette.

The Shalako was featured on the cover of seven national car magazines where it caught the attention of Malcolm Bricklin. Bricklin contracted Dean to develop his sports car concept into a full production vehicle named the Bricklin in the early 1970s. The Bricklin carried an impact-absorbing bumper, longer nose, and the signature gull wing doors.

In 1985, Dean built the world's longest limousine with his son, Keith, as a promotional car for Jay Ohrberg. The car was built in two parts so that it could be shipped to Europe in standard shipping containers. In the grueling pace of construction, Dean lost three fingertips on his left hand in an accident. Despite the accident, Dean later built many other original and replica cars for Ohrberg.

Dean continued to build cars with Dean Jeffries until his retirement, including the character cars in Death Race 2000 [1975], the remote-control Ford Explorers for Jurassic Park, prop vehicles for the James Bond film Diamonds Are Forever, and the Flintstones movie.

In the 1990s, Dean worked mostly at his passion of customizing cars from the 1940s and 1950s. His repertoire included chop, channel, section, lowering, custom grilles, lead work, and sculpting headlights and fenders. In 2004, Dean appeared on an episode of the television show Monster Garage with several of his peers (including Gene Winfield, and Bill Hines) to customize a 1954 Chevy sedan for the show's host, Jesse James.

After a career spanning over 50 years, Dean retired in 2005. Several of his cars are on permanent display at the Petersen Automotive Museum in Los Angeles.

Dick Dean was survived by his wife Jeanne (b. 1933 - d. 2011), six children, and friends (including George Barris, Dean Jeffries, Gene Winfield and Bill Hines). Dean's second son and lifelong apprentice, Keith (Kid Dean) took over the business, renaming it South End Kustom in honor of Dean's start in Wyandotte, Michigan.

Dean was honored with many trophies and was inducted into thirteen Halls of Fame, including:

- San Francisco Rod, Custom, and Motorcycle Show Hall of Fame , 2004.
- Grand National Roadster Show Hall of Fame, 1988.
- Kustom Kemps of America Hall of Fame, 1998.
- AAAA Hall of Fame, 1990.
- Darryl Starbird's National Rod & Custom Car Hall of Fame, 2008.
- NHRA Rod & Custom Winternationals Award of Excellence, 1963.
- Theodore Roosevelt High School, Distinguished Graduate, awarded in 1995.

== See also ==
- Custom car
- Kustom Kulture
