= Golden Sahara II =

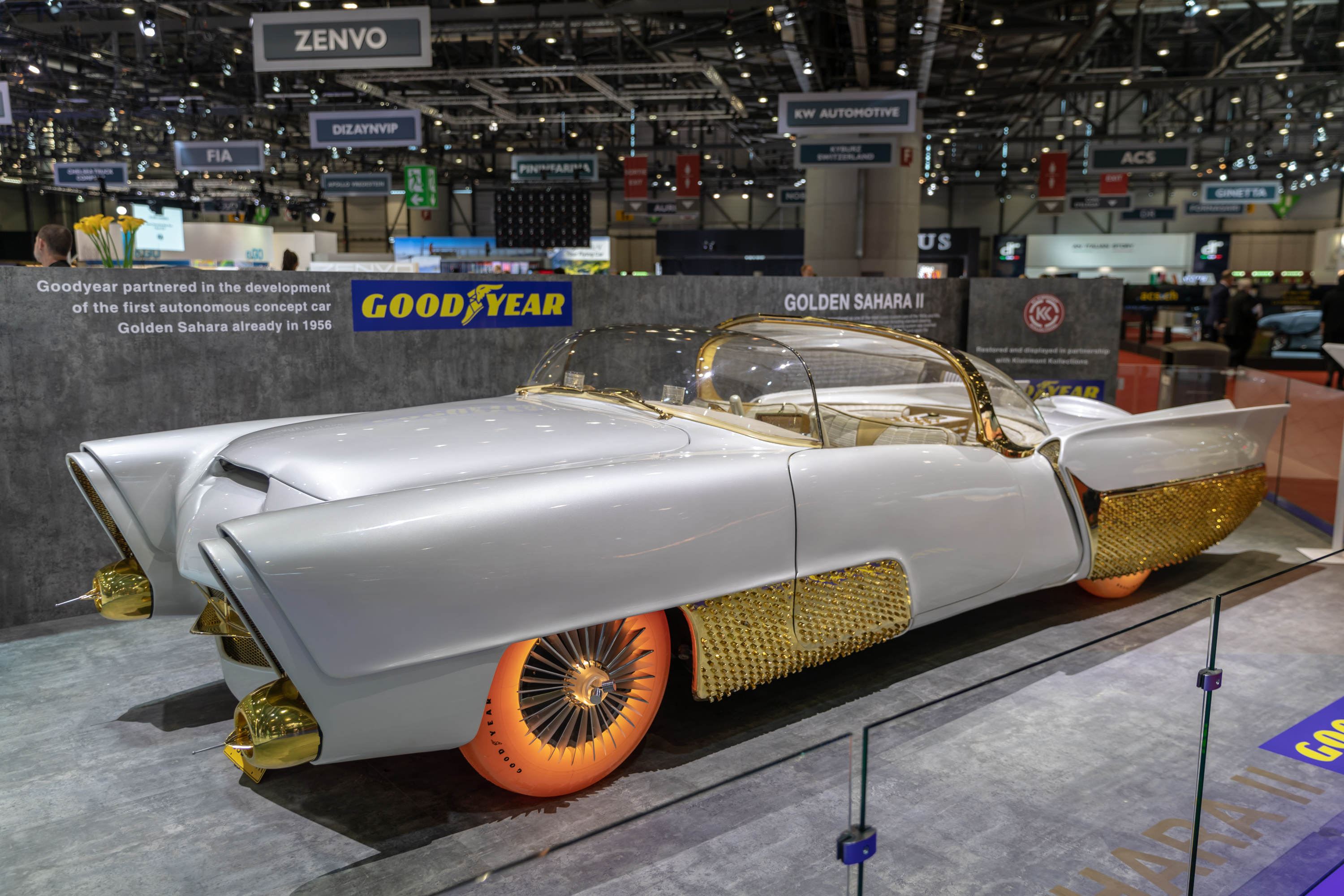
- The car at 2019 Geneva International Motor Show.

Overview
- Manufacturer: Jim "Street" Skonzakes
- Designer: George Barris

Body and chassis
- Class: Custom
- Chassis: Lincoln Capri

Powertrain
- Engine: 317 cu in (5.19 L) Lincoln Y-block V8

Dimensions
- Curb weight: 4,350 lb (1,975 kg)

The Golden Sahara II or Concept Goodyear Golden Sahara II is a futuristic concept car designed by American custom car designer George Barris, based on the 1953 Lincoln Capri, presented at the GM Motorama show in Los Angeles in 1954 and upgraded to Version II in 1956.

== History ==
The American custom car designer George Barris designed the Golden Sahara II based on the damaged chassis of his personal 1953 Lincoln Capri, with a 200 hp V8 engine.

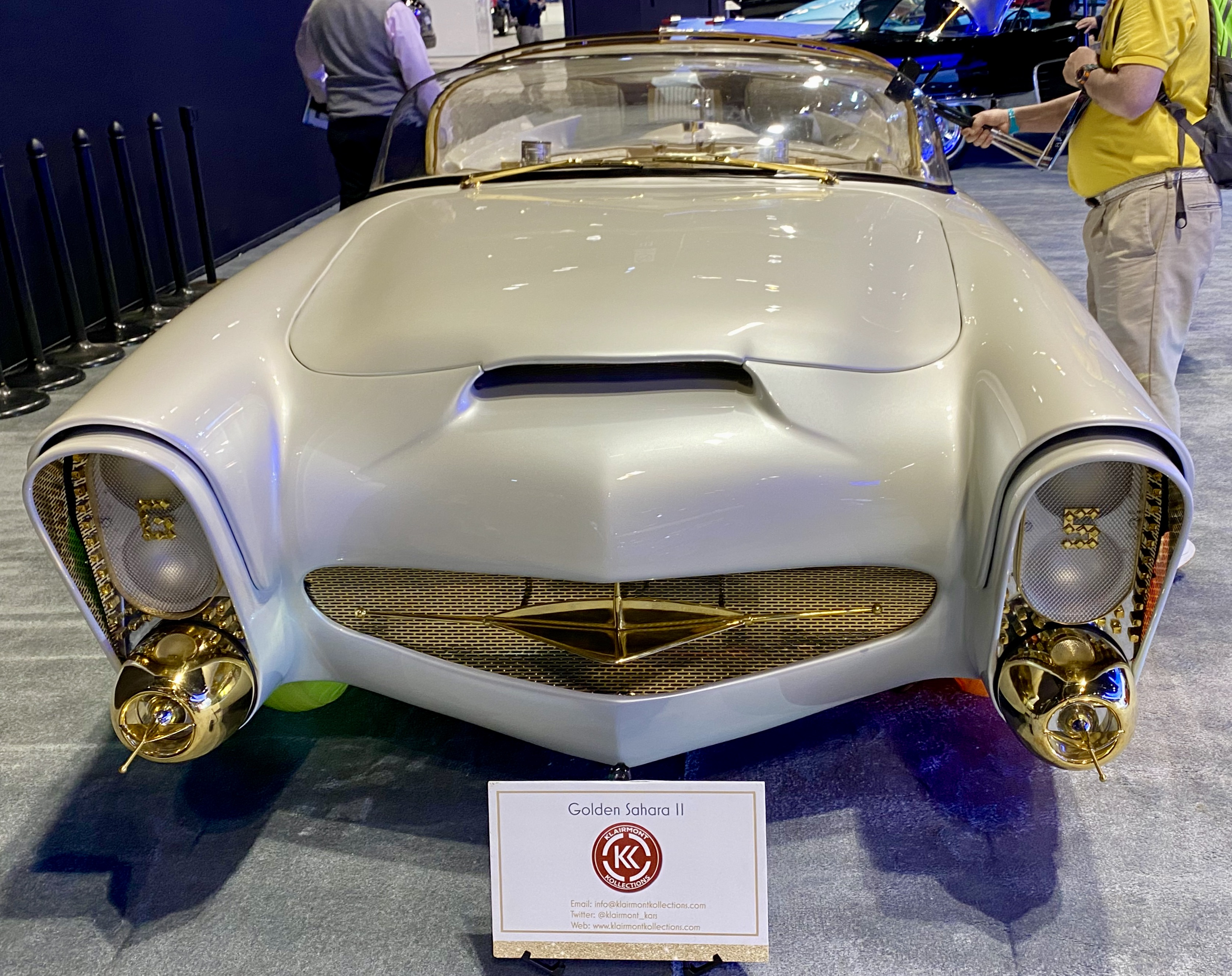

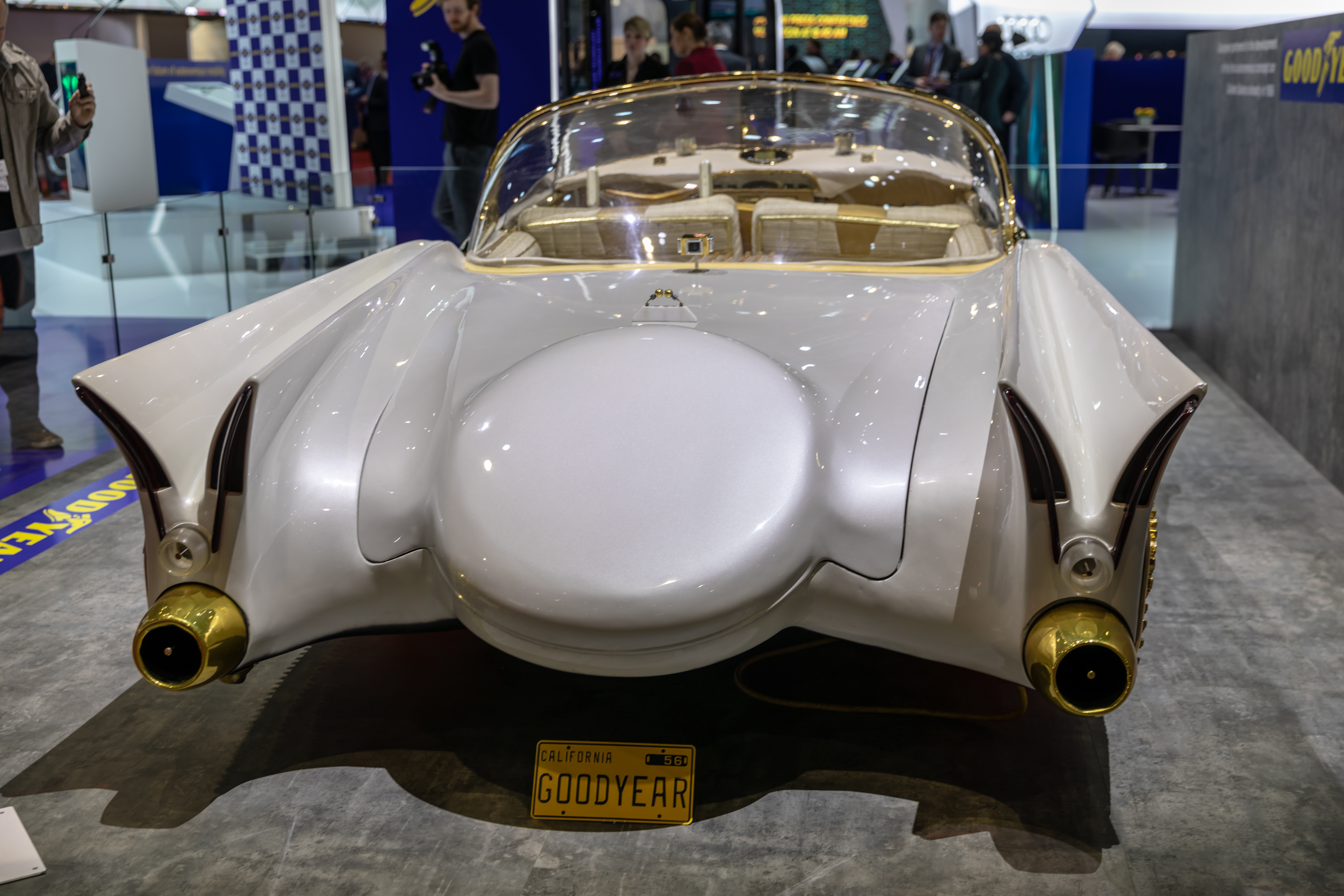

The design is inspired by the jet era and futuristic Batmobiles of the 1950s, with the glazed cockpit of a 1953 Lincoln Capri, luxurious gold-plated interior and exterior trim, translucent-luminous Goodyear tires, and advanced (and partly dummy) electronic equipment for the time: piloting controls inspired by aeronautics, automatic emergency braking based on obstacle sensors, electric door opening, voice control, radio, stereo system, tape recorder, television, telephone, and cocktail bar.

It was presented in many television programs of the time and inspired other futuristic concept cars of the era (such as the 1954 Ford FX-Atmos, 1955 Ford Mystere, 1955 Lincoln Futura, 1956 Oldsmobile Golden Rocket, and 1956 Lincoln Premiere). Currently, the Golden Sahara II is displayed at the Blackhawk Museum in Danville, CA.

== Classic car ==
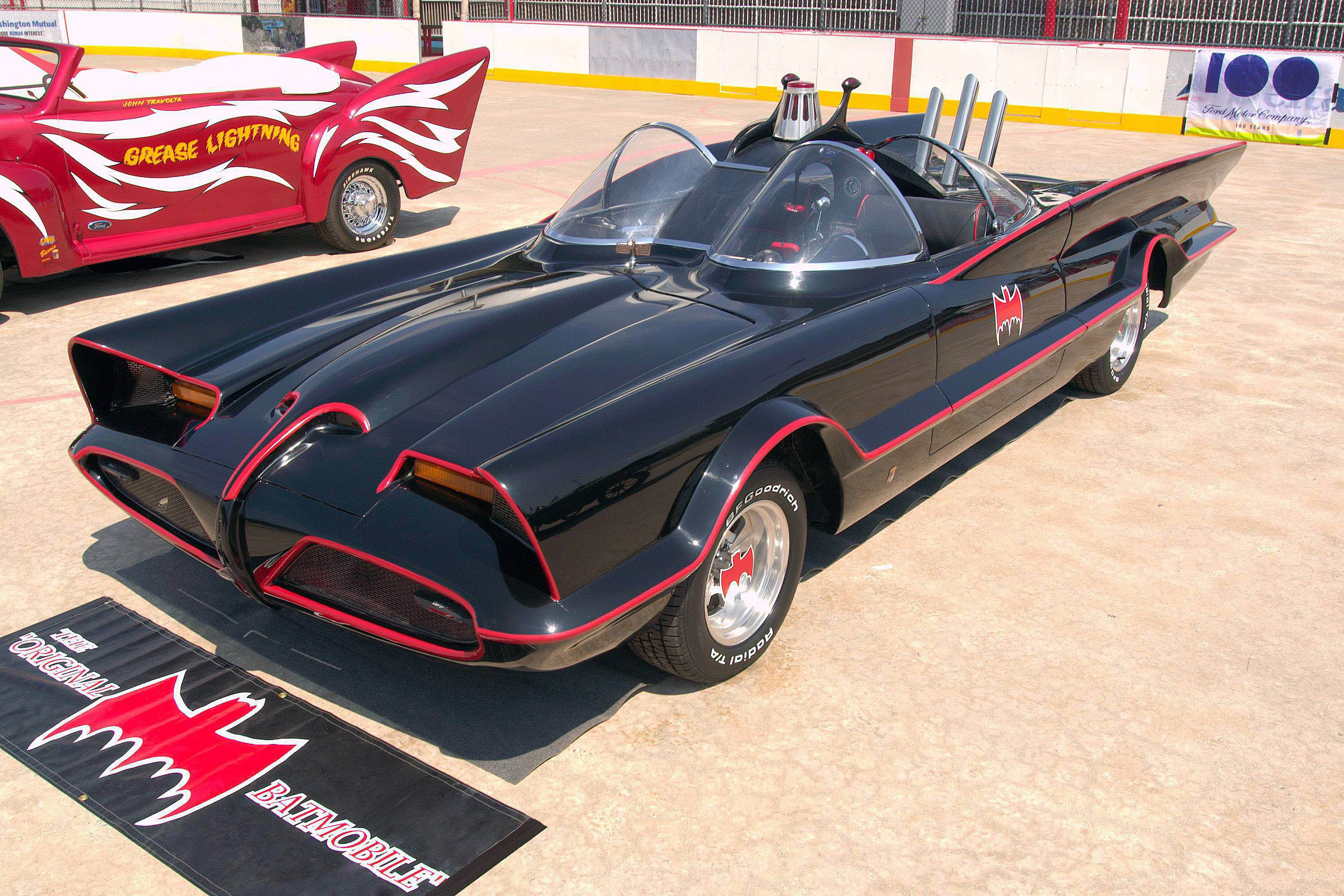
Batmobile from the Batman film (1966) by George Barris

It was purchased at an auction from its owner in 2018, and fully restored by Goodyear and the Klairmont Kollections car museum in Chicago, then successfully presented at the 2019 Geneva International Motor Show.

== In film ==
- 1960 Cinderfella
- 1966 Batman (the Batmobile was designed by George Barris, and inspired by Golden Sahara II)

== See also ==
- Kustom Kulture
