= Munster Koach =

Car used in the TV series The Munsters

- The Munsters vehicle
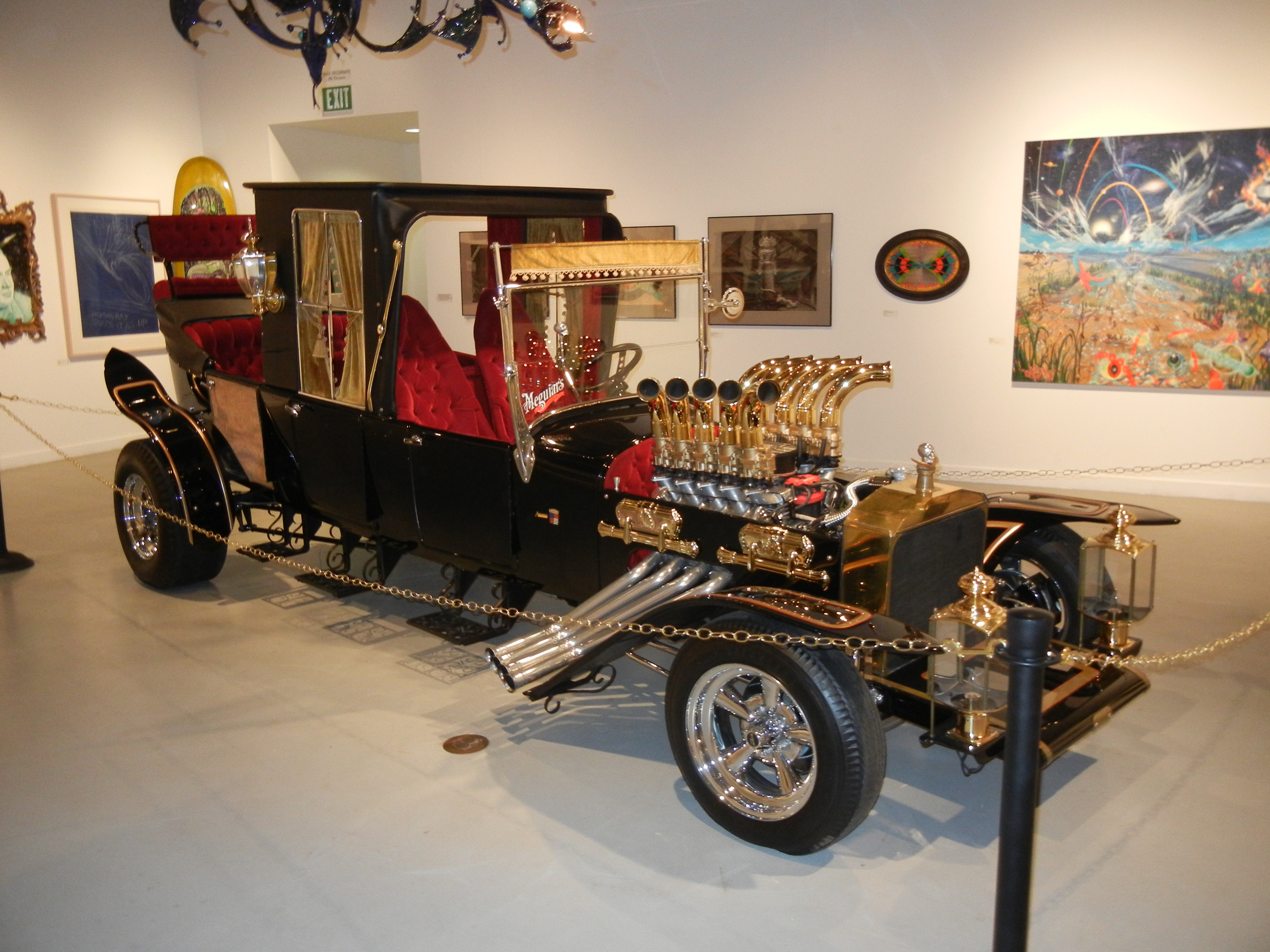

Information
- Affiliation: The Munsters

General characteristics
- Type: Car

The Munster Koach is the family car that was used in the television series, The Munsters. The show's producers contracted George Barris to provide the Koach. Barris paid show car designer Tom Daniel $200 to design the car, and had it built at Barris Kustoms, first by Tex Smith, but finished by Dick Dean, his shop foreman at the time. The Munster Koach appeared in over twenty episodes throughout the series' two-year run, and was also seen in Munster, Go Home! using different wheels. Tom Daniel's original drawing of the Munster Koach had it supercharged with a hood scoop and thin, round disc lights. Barris chose the ten-carburetor setup with the ten air horns and lantern lights.

It stands in the Volo Auto Museum.

== Specifications ==
Only one Koach was made for the television series and feature film. It was made from three Ford Model T bodies and is 18 feet long. The 133-inch frame was made by hand, as were the brass radiator and fenders. It has a blood red interior and black pearl paint. It took 500 hours to hand-form the ornate rolled steel scrollwork. The front end had a dropped axle, split radius rods and T springs. Its design featured a custom hearse body.

AMT produced a plastic model kit of the car during the series run. It has been reissued several times since. Johnny Lightning has also produced a 1/64th scale die-cast model of the car.

An unauthorized reproduction Koach was built on speculation and presented to Barris, but he declined to buy it. Tubbs Johnson, Barris' paint man, purchased the unauthorized Koach and later sold it to Jay Orhberg. Barris auctioned the original Munster Koach in 1983 with oversized gas lights and different tires and wheels. In 1984, Barris wanted a Munster Koach for the Hollywood Christmas Parade. He had Dick Dean build a second authorized Munster Koach. Dick Dean's son, Keith Dean, helped build it. This Koach was restored in the summer of 2011 with new black pearl paint, pie crust cheater slicks, new brass lantern lights, torque thrust mag wheels, smaller skull radiator cap, and had the dummy crank lever removed and sealed. They did not have Bobby Barr Headers, and there is a wide opening where those headers were located on the original.

There were five walnut blocks between the spokes of the mag wheels in rear. The rear slicks were Firestone eleven-inch pie crust slicks. The Astro mag wheels were painted blood red just on the outside of the five spokes. There was no skull radiator cap on the original Munster Koach in the 1960s. Only later did the Munster Koach get a skull cap. Both reproduction cars have been restored, but the original has not.

Series star Fred Gwynne never sat in the seat to drive the Munster Koach. Instead, he sat on the floor on the ermine-fur rugs. During the time of the television series there was a song released as a single by Decca, called "Here Comes the Munster Koach".

== Engine ==
The engine was a 289 cubic-inch Ford V8 originally configured for installation in a 1964 1/2 Mustang. It was built with Jahns high compression pistons, 10 chrome plated Carter WA-1 carburetors, an Isky cam, and had a set of Bobby Barr racing headers. It had a three-speed toploader manual transmission.

== See also ==
- DRAG-U-LA
- Batmobile

== Sources ==
- Munster Koach
