= Setzer streamliner dragster =

Overview
- Manufacturer: John Buttera
- Production: 1972
- Designer: John Buttera; Louie Teckenoff; Nye Frank

Body and chassis
- Class: Top Fuel
- Body style: Streamliner dragster
- Layout: Front-engine, rear-wheel-drive

The Setzer streamliner dragster is an unusual streamliner dragster built in 1972.

Built at John Buttera's shop, and conceived by Buttera and body man Louie Teckenoff, the car was an unusual magnesium monocoque (rather than the more commonplace tube chassis). The body panels were 0.050 in (1.3 mm)-thick sheet, fastened with adhesives and over 5,000 rivets; the inner and outer skins were separated by high-density foam. It had full-enclosed front wheels, cockpit, and engine, with a winglet ahead of the front axle and a low wing, just above the rollbar, in back. The wings were designed and positioned by Nye Frank.

The car took six months to build. It was sold to Barry Setzer for US$15,000 in 1972.

In test runs at OCIR, driver Pat Foster experienced a sudden, unexpected wheelstand. Buttera tried to solve the problem, some reporting the engine was moved, and other changes made; nevertheless, the car still had a tendency to what would now be called "blowover".

The car is now on display at the Don Garlits Museum of Drag Racing in Ocala, Florida.

== Sources ==
- Taylor, Thom. "Beauty Beyond the Twilight Zone" in Hot Rod, April 2017, pp. 30–43.
