= Freight Train (dragster) =

Overview
- Designer: Nye Frank

Body and chassis
- Class: Top Gas
- Body style: Front-engined streamliner slingshot dragster
- Layout: ront-engine, rear-wheel-drive

Powertrain
- Engine: Twin supercharged Chrysler hemi

Freight Train is a historic slingshot dragster.

Designed by Nye Frank, it used twin supercharged engines and had an aluminum body. When owned by John Peters, running in Top Gas (driven by Bob Muravez) at the 1971 Supernationals, it was painted black and powered by a pair of Chrysler hemis.

Freight Train's best result (driven by Walt Rhodes) was a win at the Gatornationals in 1971.

== Sources ==
- Taylor, Thom. "Beauty Beyond the Twilight Zone" in Hot Rod, April 2017, pp. 30–43.
- Taylor, Thom. "Duel of the Duals" in Hot Rod, April 2017, p. 11.
