= Nye Frank =

American dragster builder

Nye Frank is an American dragster builder in the 1960s and 1970s.

Among others, Frank worked on the twin-engined dragsters Freight Train and Pulsator (as designer) the Setzer streamliner (designing and positioning the wings), Flying Wedge (building the body, along with Quin Epperly), and Spirit II (collaborating in building her with Craig Breedlove).

== Sources ==
- Taylor, Thom. "Beauty Beyond the Twilight Zone" in Hot Rod, April 2017, pp.30-43.
