= George Barris (auto customizer) =

American automobile customizer (1925–2015)

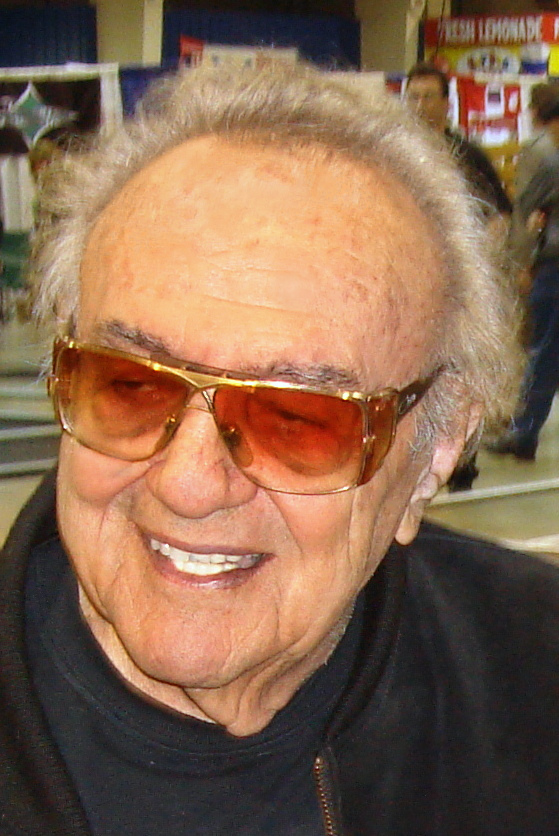
- Barris in 2013
- Born: George Salapatas; November 20, 1925; Chicago, Illinois, U.S.
- Died: November 5, 2015 (aged 89); Encino, California, U.S.
- Known for: Hot rod art, automobile customizing and pinstriping
- Notable work: Golden Sahara II; Hirohata Merc; Ala Kart; Munster Koach / DRAG-U-LA; Lincoln Futura#Batmobile; Wagon Queen Family Truckster; KITT
- Movement: Kustom Kulture
- Spouse: Shirley Nahas (m. 1958; died 2001)
- Website: www.barris.com

George Barris (born George Salapatas, November 20, 1925 – November 5, 2015) was an American designer and builder of Hollywood custom cars. Barris designed and built the Hirohata Merc. Barris's company, Barris Kustom Industries, designed and built the Munster Koach and DRAG-U-LA for The Munsters, and the 1966 Batmobile for the Batman TV series and film.

Born in Chicago on November 20, 1925, Barris and his brother Sam moved to California to live with relatives. By his high school graduation, Barris had customized and sold multiple cars. He moved to Los Angeles at the age of eighteen to build custom cars for private buyers, including the Hirohata Merc in 1951. In the 1950s, Barris's business became Barris Kustom Industries. Barris's company designed and built vehicles for multiple television series in the 1960s, including Batman, The Munsters, and The Beverly Hillbillies. Barris's company designed and built custom cars for celebrities and private individuals. His company also built replicas of cars. Barris died in Encino, Los Angeles on November 5, 2015.

== Early history ==
George and his brother Sam (1924–1967) were born in Chicago in the 1920s. Their father was a Greek immigrant from Chios. Their mother died a few years after the brothers were born. When Barris was three years old, Barris's father sent the brothers to live with an uncle and his wife in Roseville, California.

By the age of seven, Barris was building and modifying model cars made of balsa wood. His model cars won contests sponsored by hobby shops for careful attention to detail.

The brothers worked at the Greek restaurant owned by their family and were given a dilapidated 1925 Buick for their help. They swiftly restored it to running condition and experimented with changing its appearance. This became the first Barris Brothers custom car. They sold it at a profit to buy another project vehicle. Before George graduated from high school, demand for their work was growing, and they had created a club for owners of custom vehicles, called the Kustoms Car Club. This was the first use of the spelling "Kustom", which would become associated with Barris.

Barris attended San Juan High School and "rushed to sweep floors at a local auto body shop as soon as school let out". Barris resisted his family's desire for him to work at its Greek restaurant in a Sacramento suburb. He moved to Los Angeles after turning 18 years old to "become part of the emerging teen car culture" and opened the "Barris Custom Shop" on Imperial Highway in Bell, California.

George and Sam Barris built their "kustom" designs for private buyers. George also built and raced his own cars briefly. Soon, Hollywood studio executives and stars wanted the custom cars for personal use and as film props. Robert E. Petersen publicized the Barris cars through car shows and by publishing George's how-to articles in Hot Rod and Motor Trend magazines.

== Custom cars and early popularity ==
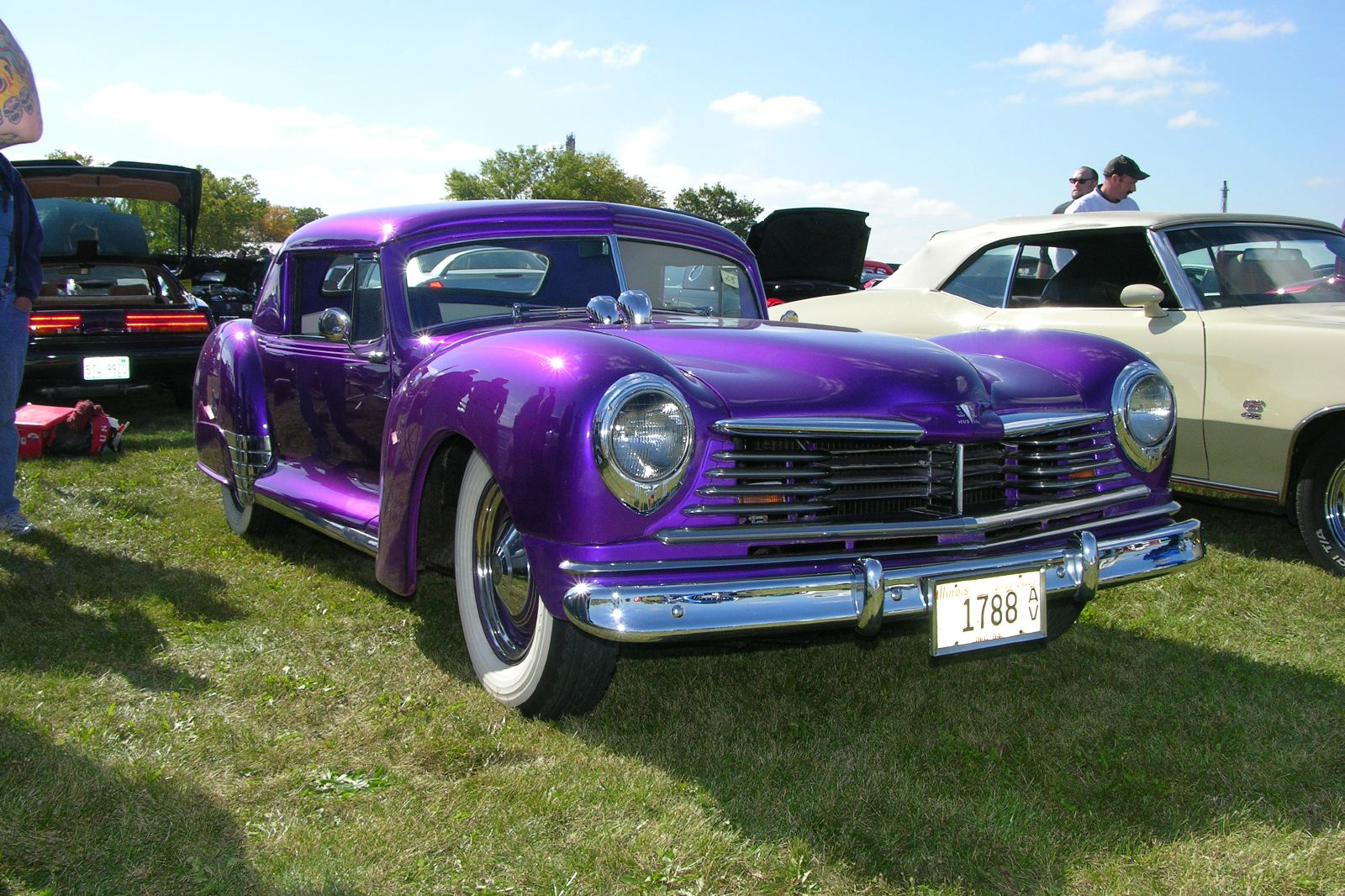
Barris custom work in 1952 performed on a 1947 Hudson

In 1951, the Barris Brothers designed and built the Hirohata Merc as a customer order based on Sam Barris's own custom car. The Hirohata Merc was shown at the 1952 General Motors Motorama auto show and was so popular, it overshadowed the best work of Detroit's top designers. It also established the early 1950s Mercury as a popular basis for custom car design. In addition, Sam built Ala Kart, a 1929 Ford Model A roadster pickup. After taking two AMBR (America's Most Beautiful Roadster) wins in a row, the car made numerous film and television appearances, usually in the background of diner scenes.

Sam left the business in the 1950s. George continued in the business with his wife Shirley, and the business became Barris Kustom Industries. The company licensed its designs to model car manufacturers such as Aurora, Revell, MPC, and AMT, which spread the Barris name into the model builder community.

In the early 1960s, Barris, along with other well-known customizers (Gene Winfield, Dean Jeffries and the Alexander Brothers) reworked production cars for Ford's "Custom Car Caravan" and "Lincoln/Mercury's Caravan of Stars". The traveling exhibits were designed to appeal to younger car buyers.

Barris also used the body of Pulsator (designed by Nye Frank) on his snowmobile dragster show car Ice Kutter.

Barris is the subject of the title story in writer Tom Wolfe's first collection of essays The Kandy-Kolored Tangerine-Flake Streamline Baby.

== Auto customizing for television, films and celebrities ==
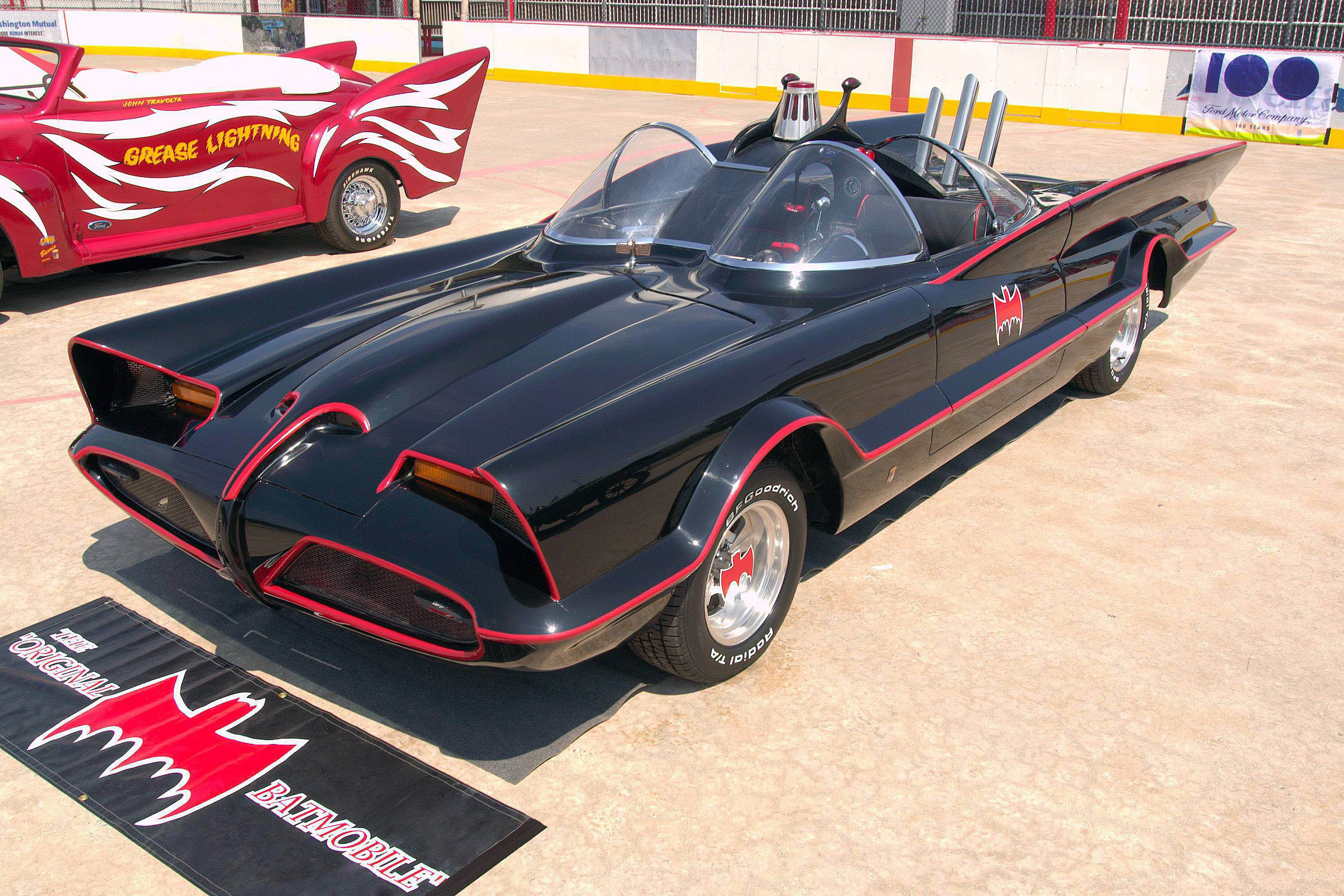
The Batmobile as seen in the 1960s Batman TV series. Photo by Jennifer Graylock

According to Barris, some of his first film work was making soft aluminum fenders for a police car that crashes into the rear of a Mercedes-Benz convertible in North by Northwest. The idea was to give the collision a comedic quality while also preventing serious damage to the expensive Mercedes. He also built and supplied cars for the 1958 film High School Confidential and loaned some of his customs for the "future" scenes in the 1960 film adaptation of H. G. Wells's The Time Machine. Other Barris-built film cars included a modified Dodge Charger for Thunder Alley, a Plymouth Barracuda for Fireball 500, the futuristic Supervan for a film of the same name, a gadget-filled Mercury station wagon for The Silencers, and a sinister rework of a Lincoln Continental Mark III for The Car.

In the 1960s, the Barris firm became heavily involved in vehicle design for a television production. At the beginning of the decade, Barris purchased the Lincoln Futura, an extravagantly designed concept car. It remained in his collection for several years, until he was unexpectedly asked by ABC Television to create a signature vehicle for their Batman television series. As filming would begin in a few weeks, there was not enough time to create a new design from scratch. Instead, Barris used the Futura as the base for the Batmobile. Barris hired Bill Cushenbery to modify the car, which was ready in three weeks. The show's popularity added to Barris's fame. Barris owned the Batmobile until he sold it at a 2013 auction.

Other television cars built by Barris Kustom Industries include the Munster Koach and the DRAG-U-LA for The Munsters, an Oldsmobile Toronado turned into a roadster used in the first season of Mannix, a 1921 Oldsmobile touring car turned into a truck for The Beverly Hillbillies, the fictional "1928 Porter" for the NBC comedy My Mother the Car, updated KITTs for later seasons of Knight Rider, and replicas of 1914 Stutz Bearcats for Bearcats!.

Barris created a customized gold Rolls-Royce for actress Zsa Zsa Gabor. The golden Rolls-Royce displayed the detailed work of Barris and included hand-etched window glass by Robb Rich showing butterflies, roses, and hummingbirds.

Barris built many novelty vehicles for other celebrities. These include golf carts for Bob Hope, Bing Crosby, Ann-Margret, Glen Campbell, and Elton John; and 25 modified Mini Mokes for a record company contest involving the Beach Boys. Barris also modified cars for Hollywood stars. Some examples include a Cadillac limousine for Elvis Presley, a custom 1970's Corvette C3 for Farrah Fawcett (nicknamed the "Foxy Vette"), a custom Pontiac station wagons for John Wayne, a Cadillac Eldorado turned into a station wagon for Dean Martin, and a pair of "his & hers" 1966 Ford Mustang convertibles for Sonny and Cher. With the cooperation of American Motors, in 1969 he modified an AMX coupe into the AMX-400 show car, later used in a 1972 episode of Banacek.

In the 1990s, NASA contacted Barris to request the designs of the Moonscope vehicle, a 1966 design that was a popular plastic car model for collectors. NASA engineers designing Martian rovers and vehicles were interested in the Moonscope's 6-wheel spider suspension and large wedged tires. Edward Lozzi, spokesperson for George Barris, stated, "NASA contacted my office and requested the original designs of the Moonscope from Barris. They revealed they were interested in studying the Barris designs for the Martian vehicles. Barris gave them permission and NASA sent people to meet with him".

Between 2002 and 2006, Barris also designed two custom Cadillac hearses for episodes of the cable television series Monster Garage. Barris' company often builds replicas of non-Barris designed vehicles from other TV series, including The Monkees Monkeemobile, Starsky & Hutch (Ford Torino), Power Rangers (Turbo Vehicles) and Knight Rider KITT. Barris also designed and built the "Wagon Queen Family Truckster", based on a 1979 Ford Country Squire station wagon, for the 1983 film National Lampoon's Vacation.

== Later career ==
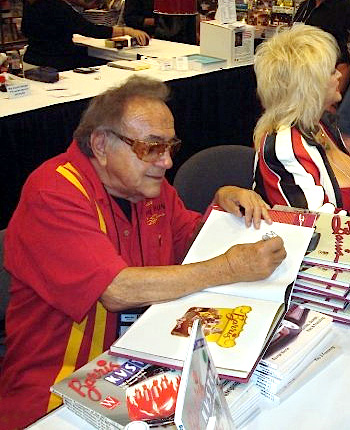
George Barris signing autographs at the 2008 SEMA show in Las Vegas, seated next to "Miss Hurst Shifter" Linda Vaughn

In 2005 The New York Times had Barris customize a Toyota Prius, which they called one of the most popular yet least attractive cars in the U.S. The budget was $10,000, and a further condition was not to chop the body or interfere with the hybrid mechanics in any way.

In April 2010, the special George Barris design edition of the 2010 Chevrolet Camaro Spirit was introduced to the public for the first time at a VIP media event at Community Chevrolet, one of the largest Chevrolet dealerships in the United States.

On November 29, 2012, Barris Kustom and George Barris announced the sale of the Number 1 Batmobile at the Barrett-Jackson car show and auction held in Scottsdale, Arizona. The world-famous vehicle went on the auction block, on January 19, 2013. The final sale price, after a very intense bidding war, was $4.6 million to car collector Rick Champagne from Arizona.

== Back to the Future controversy ==
Over a decade after the release of Back to the Future Part III, Barris restored one of the DeLorean time machine stunt cars. Barris later purchased a stock DeLorean and converted it into a replica of the Back to the Future DeLorean, which he used to promote himself and his company. While Barris never officially stated that he had anything to do with the Back to the Future films, he would state that he had built a Back to the Future DeLorean without disclosing that it was a replica car.

In 2007, Universal Studios officials sent Barris a cease and desist order demanding that he never again make "misrepresentations regarding any involvement with the Back to the Future films". The order called upon Barris to remove images of the flying DeLorean from his company's website and to restrict displaying any replicas of cars from the films. Back to the Future writer/producer Bob Gale said, "George Barris had absolutely nothing to do with the design or construction of the DeLorean time travel vehicle."

== Personal life and death ==
Barris was married to Shirley Nahas from 1958 until she died in 2001. They had two children. Barris died on November 5, 2015, in his sleep at his home in Encino, Los Angeles, California, fifteen days before his 90th birthday.

== Filmography ==
=== Features ===
- Batman – car designer, The Batmobile (uncredited) (1966)
- Munster, Go Home! – car designer (uncredited) (1966)
- Supervan – car customizer (1977)
- The Car – car customizer (1977)
- Jurassic Park – car modifications (uncredited) (1993)
- Turbo: A Power Rangers Movie – car customizer (1997)
- James Dean: Race with Destiny – car customizer (1997)

=== Television ===
- The Munsters – technical advisor — 1 episode, Hot Rod Herman (1965)
- Batman – car designer, The Batmobile, 120 episodes (1966–1968)
- Mannix – car customizer, Mannix Roadster (1967)
- The Banana Splits Adventure Hour – car designer, 5 episodes (1968)
- The Beverly Hillbillies – car designer, 3 episodes (1962–1963), production assistant, 1 episode (1968)
- The Bugaloos – car designer, 14 episodes (1970–1971)
- Bearcats! – car, Bearcat, 13 episodes (1971)
- Banacek – modified AMX-400 (1972)
- Starsky and Hutch – car designer, "striped tomato" Torino (1975–1979)
- The Dukes of Hazzard – car modifications (1979)
- Knight Rider – car designer (1982–1986)
- The Late Show – episode dated April 28, 1988, as himself (1988)
- Biography – episode, The Munsters: America's First Family of Fright, as himself (2003)
- TV's Greatest Cars – TV movie documentary, as himself (2004)
- TV Land's Top Ten – TV series documentary – episode, Top 10 TV Cars, as himself (2004)
- The Jace Hall Show – episode, Pow! Biff! Kaboom!, as himself (2010)
- Totally Tracked Down – episode, Holy Batman!, as himself (2010)
- The Batmobile – TV movie documentary, as himself (2012)
- G4 Presents Comic Con 2012 Live – TV movie, as himself (2012)
- American Pickers – episode, California Kustoms, as himself (2013)

== See also ==
- Kustom (cars)
- Kustom Kulture
