= The Munsters =

American sitcom (1964–1966)

- Early Season One opening, with Yvonne De Carlo featured behind the title
- Created by: Allan Burns; Chris Hayward
- Developed by: Norm Liebmann; Ed Haas
- Starring: Fred Gwynne; Yvonne De Carlo; Al Lewis; Beverley Owen (1964); Pat Priest (1964–1966); Butch Patrick
- Theme music composer: Jack Marshall; Bob Mosher (unaired lyrics)
- Opening theme: "The Munsters' Theme"
- Ending theme: "The Munsters' Theme"
- Composer: Jack Marshall
- Country of origin: United States
- Original language: English
- No. of seasons: 2
- No. of episodes: 70 (list of episodes)

Production
- Producers: Joe Connelly; Bob Mosher
- Production locations: Universal Studios, Universal City, California
- Camera setup: Single-camera
- Running time: 23–26 minutes
- Production companies: Kayro-Vue Productions; Universal Television

Original release
- Network: CBS
- Release: September 24, 1964 – May 12, 1966

Related
- The Munsters Today; Mockingbird Lane

The Munsters is an American sitcom about the home life of a family of benign monsters that aired from 1964 to 1966 on CBS. The series stars Fred Gwynne as Herman Munster (Frankenstein's monster), (Note: Episodes referring to the fact that Herman is Frankenstein's monster include #55, "Just Another Pretty Face," in which Grandpa explains how he came to possess Herman's original blueprint by reading the inscription on it: "To our favorite Count, Dracula - a souvenir from Dr. Frankenstein and all the guys and gals" and #61, "Cyrano de Munster," in which Lily, suspecting Herman of infidelity, tells Marilyn: "I'll take Herman apart so that even Dr. Frankenstein couldn't put him together") Yvonne De Carlo as his vampire wife Lily, Al Lewis as Grandpa (Count Dracula), (Note: Episodes mentioning that Grandpa is Count Dracula include #55, "Just Another Pretty Face," in which he explains his possession of Herman's original blueprint by reading the inscription on it: "To our favorite Count, Dracula - a souvenir from Dr. Frankenstein and all the guys and gals," and #58, "Grandpa's Lost Wife," in which a legal document names him as "sometimes known as 'The Count,' sometimes known as 'Sam Dracula.'") Beverley Owen (later replaced by Pat Priest) as their niece Marilyn, and Butch Patrick as their werewolf-like son Eddie. A family pet named "Spot" was a fire-breathing dragon.

Produced by the creators of Leave It to Beaver, the series was a satire of American suburban life, the wholesome television family fare of the era and traditional monster movies. It achieved higher Nielsen ratings than did the similarly macabre-themed The Addams Family, which aired concurrently on ABC.

In 1965, The Munsters was nominated for the Golden Globe Award for Best Television Series but lost to The Rogues. In the 21st century, it received several TV Land Award nominations, including one for Most Uninsurable Driver (Herman Munster).

The series originally aired on Thursdays at 7:30 p.m. from September 24, 1964 to May 12, 1966. Seventy episodes were produced. The show was canceled after ratings had dropped to a series low in the face of competition from ABC's Batman. Patrick said, "I think Batman was to blame. Batman just came along and took our ratings away." However, The Munsters found a large audience in syndication. A spinoff series ensued, as well as several films, including one with a theatrical release and several more recent attempts to reboot it.

== Premise ==
The Munsters are a Transylvanian-American family living at 1313 Mockingbird Lane in the fictional city of Mockingbird Heights. (Note: A close-up of a bounced check in episode 44 reveals the family address and city, but no state.) The series' running gag is that the odd-looking family with strange tastes considers itself to be an average American family. Herman is the family's sole wage-earner, although Lily and Grandpa make short-lived attempts to earn money from time to time. While Herman is the head of the household, Lily also makes many decisions. According to episode 44 ("Happy 100th Anniversary"), they were married in 1865.

Other than Marilyn, the characters' costumes and appearances were based on the classic monsters of Universal Studios films of the 1930s and 1940s, including the iconic version of Frankenstein's monster developed by Jack Pierce for the 1931 Universal film Frankenstein. As Universal jointly produced The Munsters, the show was able to employ the copyrighted designs. Makeup for the series was credited to Bud Westmore, who pioneered many other makeup effects and designs for the studio's monsters after Pierce.

The show satirized the typical family sitcom formula of the era: the well-meaning father, the nurturing mother, the eccentric live-in relative, the naïve teenager and the precocious child. The show also references several real sitcoms. In episode 45, "Operation Herman", Lily tells Herman to have a father-son talk with Eddie because "a thing like this is up to the father. Anyone who's watched Father Knows Best for nine years ought to know that," to which Herman replies, "All right. But Donna Reed always handles things on her show." In episode 47, "John Doe Munster", Grandpa describes My Three Sons as being about a "crazy, mixed-up family that's always having weird adventures." (Note: Nick at Nite's Classic TV Companion, edited by Tom Hill, copyright 1996 by Viacom International. "Some crystal ball you've got!" Herman complained to Grandpa. "All it can do is pick up reruns of My Little Margie!")

Al Lewis explained, "We can do a lot of satirical pointed things on society that you couldn't do on an ordinary show." Lewis also said, "Philosophically, the format is that in spite of the way people look to you physically, underneath there is a heart of gold.

The Munsters reflected changes in social attitudes during the civil-rights era, and in 2020 a speech that Herman makes to Eddie in the 1965 episode "Eddie's Nickname" went viral: "The lesson I want you to learn is that it doesn't matter what you look like. You can be tall or short; or fat or thin; ugly or handsome—like your father—or you can be black, or yellow or white, it doesn't matter. What does matter is the size of your heart and the strength of your character."

== Cast ==
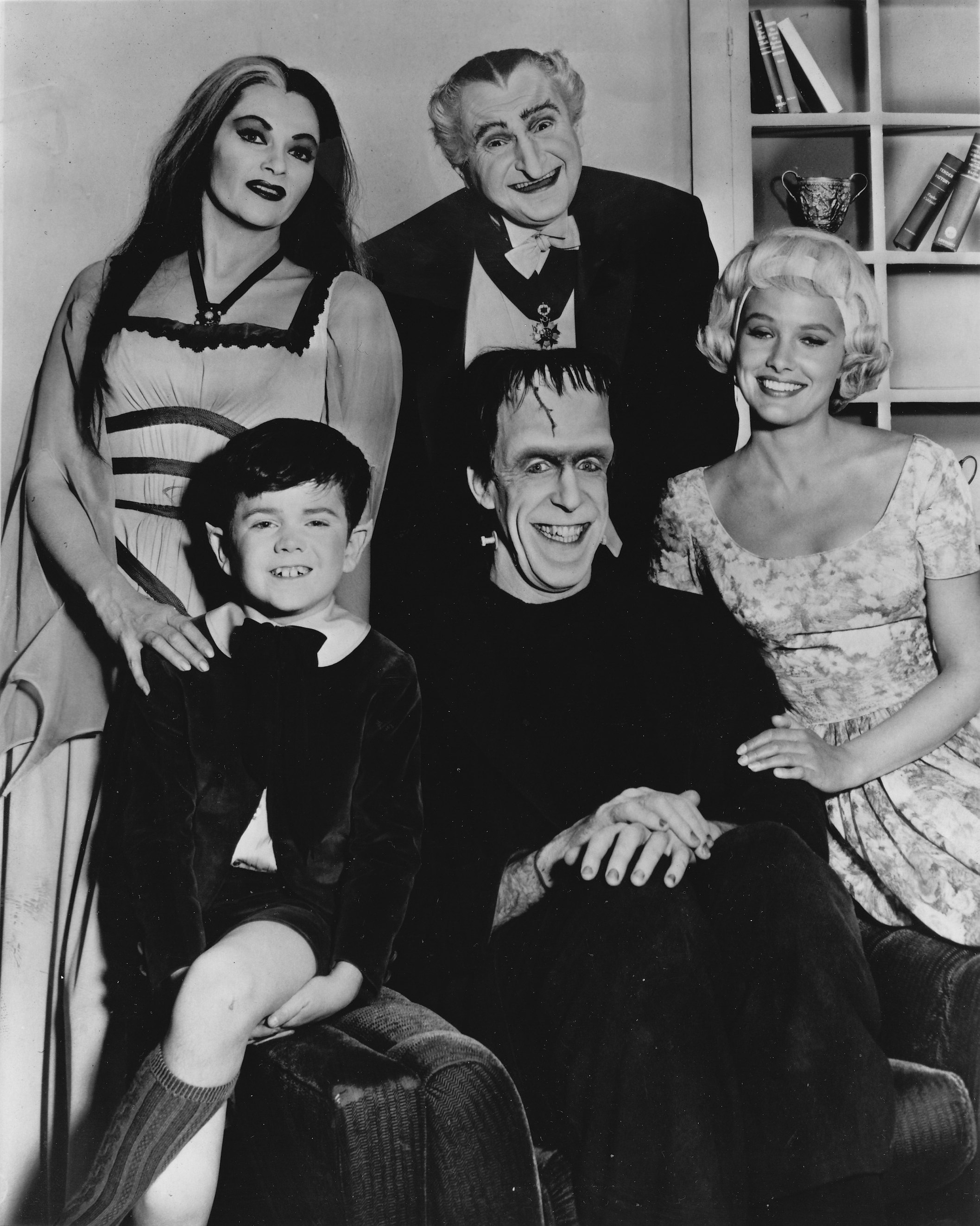
The cast of The Munsters in an early publicity photo. Standing, L–R: Yvonne De Carlo, Al Lewis. Sitting: Butch Patrick, Fred Gwynne, Beverley Owen

=== Regulars ===
- Fred Gwynne as Herman Munster
- Yvonne De Carlo as Lily Munster
- Al Lewis as Grandpa
- Butch Patrick as Eddie Munster
- Beverley Owen as Marilyn Munster (ep. 1–13)
- Pat Priest as Marilyn Munster (ep. 14–70)
- Mel Blanc – the voice of Charlie the Raven
- Bob Hastings – the voice of Charlie the Raven

=== Recurring characters ===
- Paul Lynde as Dr. Edward H. Dudley (ep. 4, 6, 19)
  - Dom DeLuise as Dr. Edward H. Dudley (ep. 55)
- John Carradine as Mr. Gateman, Herman's boss at the funeral parlor (ep. 37, 62)
- Chet Stratton as Clyde Thornton, Herman's coworker at the funeral parlor (ep. 53, 61)
- Bryan O'Byrne as Uriah, Calvin and another coworker at the funeral parlor

== Episodes ==
=== Pitch episode ===
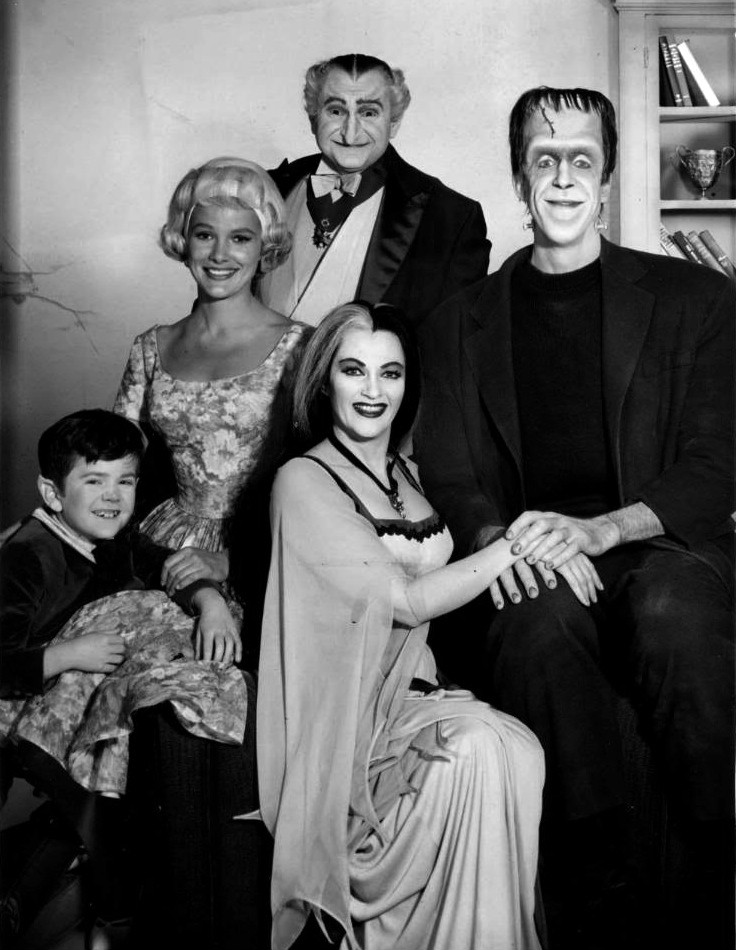
The original cast in 1964

The first presentation was filmed in color and ran 16 minutes (later cut to just over 13 minutes). It was used to pitch the series to CBS and its affiliates. (The episode is available on the first season of The Munsters DVDs.) It never aired, but the script was reused as the basis for Episode 2, "My Fair Munster". The cast in the title sequence included Joan Marshall as Phoebe (instead of Lily), Beverley Owen as Marilyn, Nate "Happy" Derman as Eddie, Al Lewis as Grandpa and Fred Gwynne as Herman. Although the same house exterior was used, it was later changed to appear spookier for the series. This included adding the tower deck and Marilyn's deck, a new coat of paint and enlarging the living room. Although Grandpa had the same dungeon, Gwynne did not wear padding in the pitch episode, had a more protruding forehead, and was broad but thin. The most noticeable difference was his somber expression rather than his comic silliness during the series. Except for Marilyn, the family had a blue-green tint to their skin. The biggest character difference was that Eddie was portrayed by Derman as a nasty brat. Eddie, as played by Patrick, was mostly respectful.

The pilot title sequence had light, happy music borrowed from the Doris Day movie The Thrill of It All instead of the instrumental rock theme. It was also decided that Marshall too closely resembled Morticia Addams and that Derman was too nasty as Eddie, so both were replaced. On the basis of the first presentation, the new series, still not completely cast, was announced by CBS on February 18, 1964. A second black-and-white presentation was filmed with DeCarlo and Patrick. In this version, Eddie appeared with a more normal look, although his hairstyle was later altered to include a pronounced widow's peak.

=== Marineland Carnival (1965 Easter special) ===
During the first season, the Munster family appeared in an Easter special when they visited Marineland of the Pacific in Palos Verdes, California, to get a new pet for Eddie. Shot on videotape, the episode aired just once on CBS on April 18, 1965, and was long thought lost until a copy was donated to the Paley Center in New York in 1997.

=== Episode list ===
Season	Episodes	Originally released	
Season	Episodes	First released	Last released
Pilots		Unaired	
1	38	September 24, 1964	June 10, 1965
Special		April 18, 1965	
2	32	September 16, 1965	May 12, 1966

== Production ==
=== Development ===
The idea of a family of comical monsters was first suggested to Universal Studios by animator Bob Clampett, who developed the idea from 1943 to 1945 as a series of cartoons. The project did not make progress until mid-1963 when a similar idea was submitted by The Adventures of Rocky and Bullwinkle and Friends writers Allan Burns and Chris Hayward. The proposal was later handed to writers Norm Liebman and Ed Haas, who wrote a pilot script, Love Thy Monster.

According to Burns, "We sort of stole the idea from Charles Addams and his New Yorker cartoons.... Because Universal owned the Frankenstein character and the Dracula character for movie rights, they decided to take their characters instead of the characters we had written."

While some executives believed that the series should be animated, others who argued for live action prevailed. In 1964, a live-action pilot titled "My Fair Munster" was filmed in color by MCA Television for CBS. Fred Gwynne and Al Lewis were the first to be cast early in February 1964. They had recently completed the series Car 54, Where Are You? and had good chemistry together. Beverly Owen was signed to play Marilyn, Joan Marshall was cast as Herman's wife Phoebe and "Happy" Nate Derman was cast as Eddie. The tone in the original pilot was vastly different than the series to follow with Gwynne initially portraying Herman as a very somber and downtrodden individual and Derman's portrayl of Eddie as a mean brat. A second pilot was ordered in April 1964 with Yvonne De Carlo replacing Marshall, and the character renamed Lily. For a third pilot, Derman was replaced by Butch Patrick. CBS liked both De Carlo and Patrick, but ordered a fourth pilot in which Eddie was less spoiled.

The show was produced by Joe Connelly and Bob Mosher, who were already known for creating the Leave It to Beaver television series. Prior to that, they had written many episodes of Amos 'n' Andy, a popular network radio program, during its half-hour comedy era.

=== Filming ===
Over the course of Season 1, the makeup for Herman, Lily and Grandpa was adjusted. Lily's hair originally had a large white streak, which was reduced in later episodes. Her necklace featured a bat instead of a star, and her eyebrows were angled more. Grandpa's makeup was exaggerated, including heavier eyebrows, and Herman's face was widened for a dopier and less human appearance. Gwynne also added a stutter whenever Herman was angry or wanted to make a point, and he frequently left his mouth open, adding to the effect of a goofy, less frightening figure.

=== Sets ===
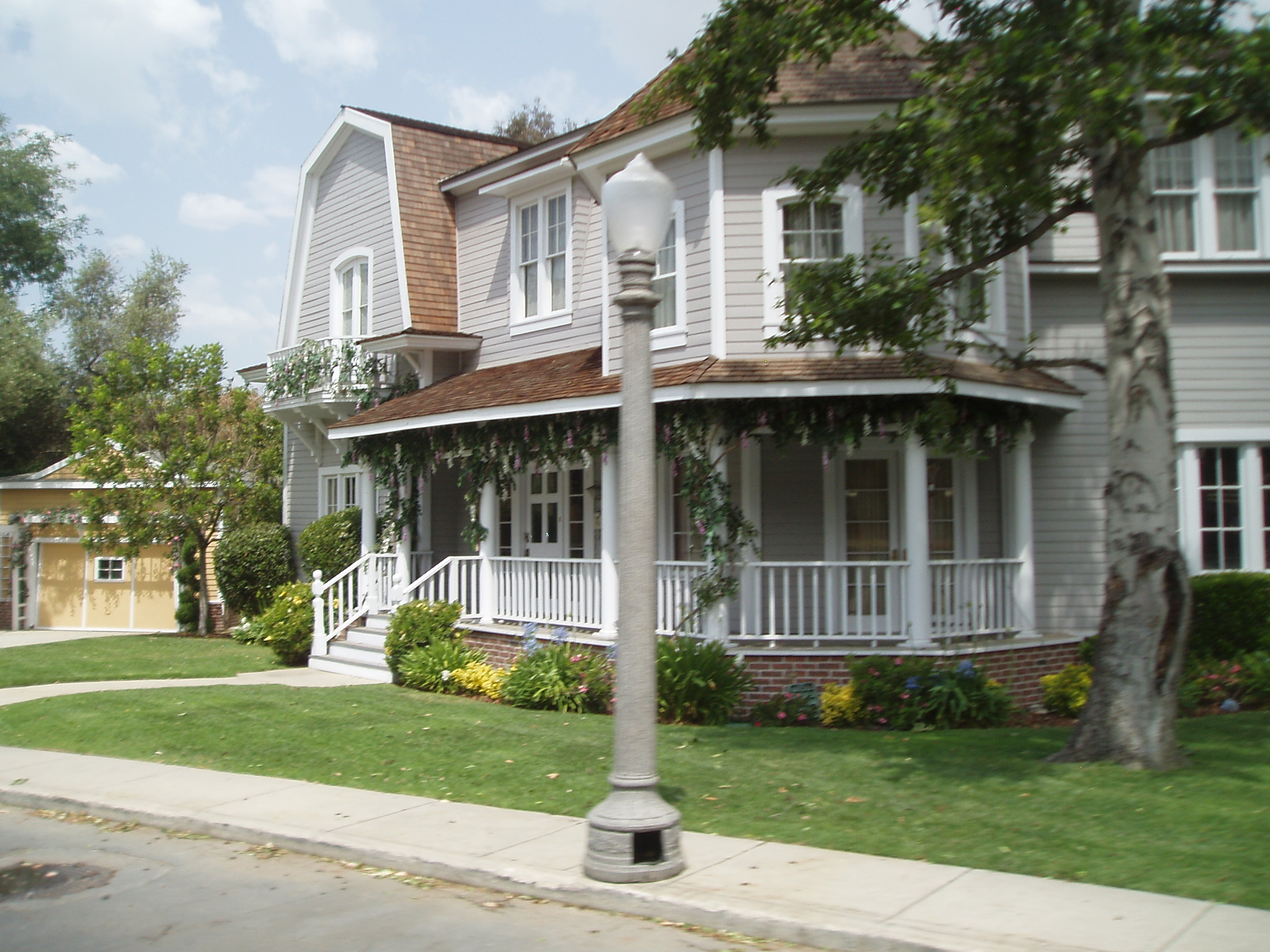
The mansion as seen at the Universal Studios Lot

The Munsters' home was a decaying Second Empire Victorian Gothic-style mansion. At one point the address was supposed to be 43 Mockingbird Lane, Camelot, New Jersey, but was changed to 1313 Mockingbird Lane in the city of Mockingbird Heights (state unknown) when filming began. In later incarnations of the series the location is described as a small town outside Los Angeles.

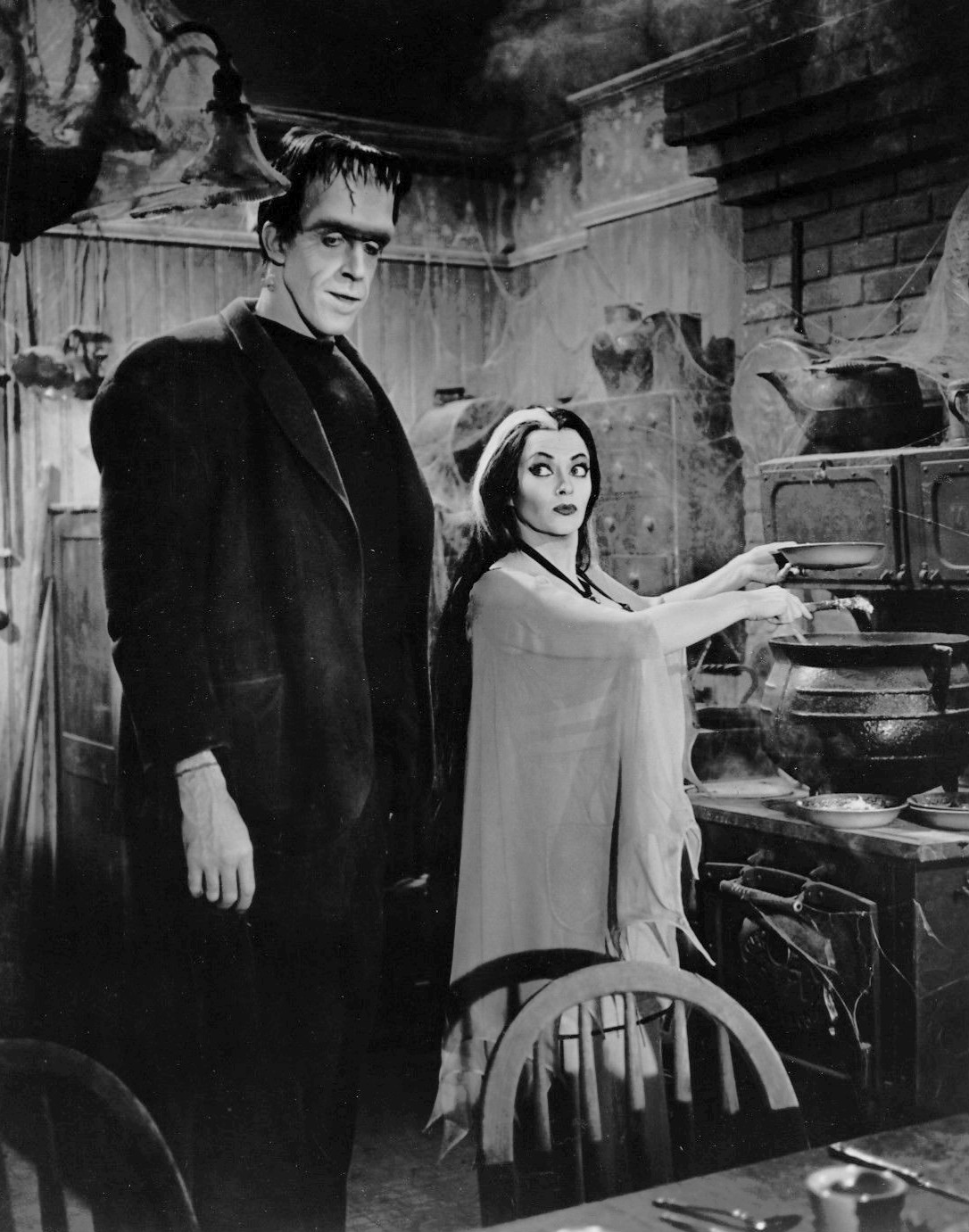
Herman and Lily in the kitchen

The Munster home was on the Universal Studios back lot. It was originally constructed with two other houses on Stage 12, the studio's largest soundstage, for the 1946 film So Goes My Love. After that film was completed, the sets were put in storage until 1950, when they (along with other house sets built from stock units) were reassembled on "River Road" along the north edge of the back lot. All three houses appeared in many television shows and films, including Leave It to Beaver.

In 1964, the house was redressed and distressed to portray the Munster home, and a stone wall was added around the property. After The Munsters ended its run, the house was restored. It was the home of the family in Shirley (NBC, 1979–80).

In 1981, all of the houses on River Road were moved from the north end of the lot to their present location. The former Munster house was used in Coach and, after another remodel, Desperate Housewives.

The interiors of the Munsters' mansion were filmed on Stages 30 and 32 at Universal Studios. The interior was riddled with dust, smoke and cobwebs. (When Lily "dusted" the house, her Electrolux emitted clouds of dust, which she applied to surfaces that would normally be cleaned.) As a running gag, parts of the house would often be damaged, mostly by Herman's tantrums or clumsiness, but the damage would not last.

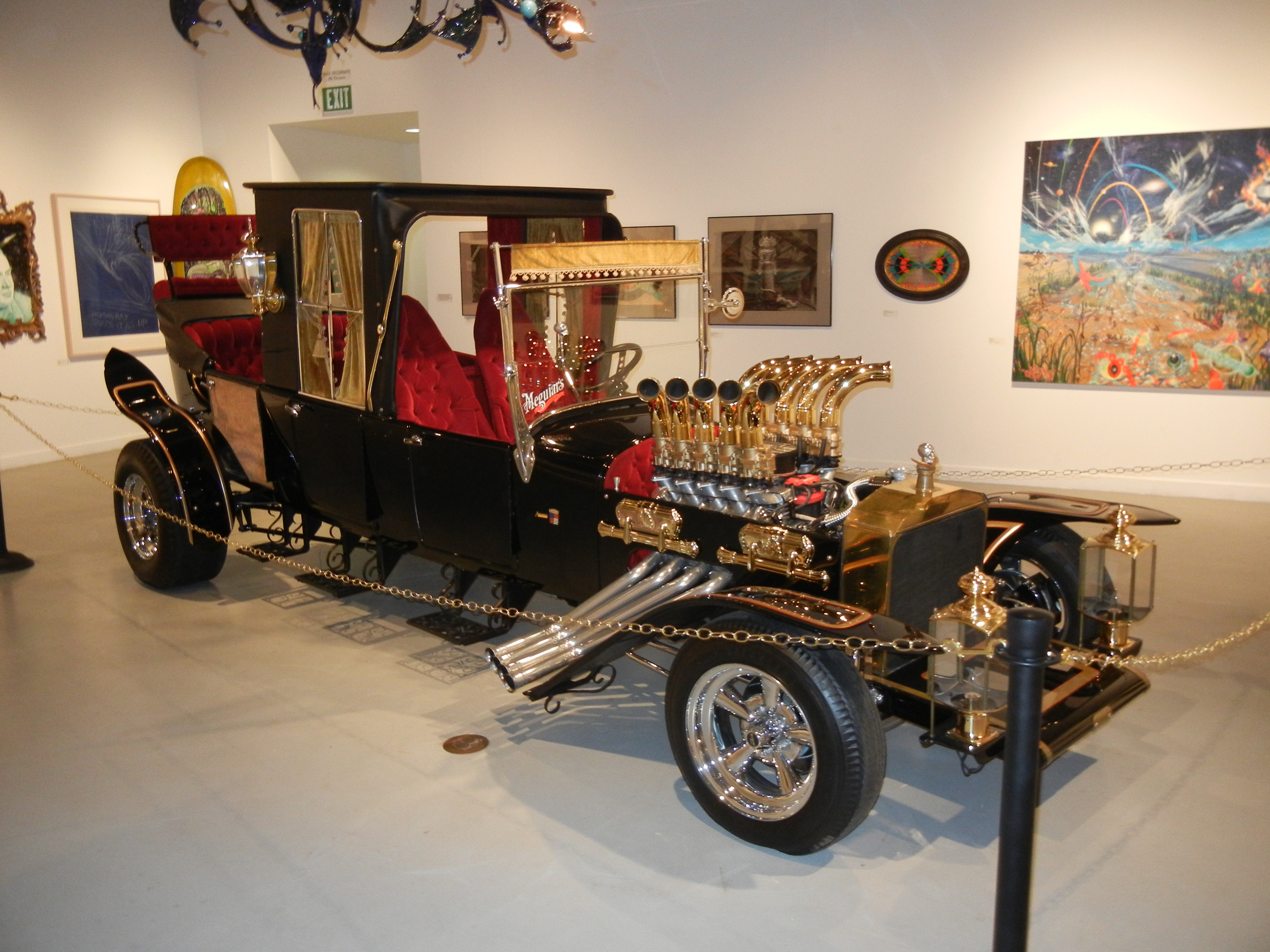
The Munster Koach

=== Props ===
In the fourth episode ("Rock-A-Bye Munster"), Lily buys a hot rod and a hearse from a used-car dealership and has them customized into one car (the Munster Koach) as Herman's birthday present. The Munster Koach and DRAG-U-LA (built by Grandpa in episode 36, "Hot Rod Herman") were designed by Tom Daniel and built by auto customizer George Barris for the show. The Munster Koach was a hot rod built on a lengthened 1926 Ford Model T chassis with a custom hearse body. It was 18 feet long and cost almost $20,000 to build. Barris also built the DRAG-U-LA, a dragster built from a coffin (according to Barris, a real coffin was purchased for the car), which Grandpa used to win back the Munster Koach after Herman lost it in a race.

=== Theme song ===
The instrumental theme song, titled "The Munsters' Theme", was composed by composer/arranger Jack Marshall. Described by writer Jon Burlingame as a "Bernard-Herrmann-meets-Duane-Eddy sound", the theme was nominated for a Grammy Award in 1965. The song's lyrics, which were written by coproducer Bob Mosher, were never aired on CBS.

== Syndication ==
The series entered syndication on local stations after its original run. In the 1990s, it aired on Nick at Nite and on TV Land from 1995 to 1998. In October 2011, the series was picked up by Cartoon Network's sister channel Boomerang and ran through the entire month of October that year for Halloween along with The Addams Family.

On October 5, 2015, Cozi TV began airing the series. The show made its debut on FETV on September 29, 2025.

== Reception ==
=== Ratings ===
- 1964–1965: #18 (24.7 rating) – Tied with Gilligan's Island
- 1965–1966: #61 (no rating given, 30.7 share)

== TV appearances in character ==
Fred Gwynne and Al Lewis appeared in full makeup and costumes riding in the Munster Koach in the 1964 Macy's Thanksgiving Day Parade.

Gwynne made solo appearances in character on The Red Skelton Show in April 1965, in the special Murray The K – It's What's Happening, Baby in June 1965 and (in his first televised appearance as Herman Munster, before the premiere of The Munsters) on The Danny Kaye Show in 1964.

== Franchise ==
=== Film ===
Several Munsters movies were released. Two featuring original cast members include Munster, Go Home! (1966), and The Munsters' Revenge (1981). A television film titled Here Come the Munsters aired in 1995, and The Munsters' Scary Little Christmas was released in 1996. A feature film titled The Munsters was released on September 22, 2022.

=== TV ===
==== The Mini-Munsters ====
In 1973, ABC aired an animated one-hour special, The Mini-Munsters, based on characters from the original series.

==== The Munsters Today ====
A first-run syndication television series titled The Munsters Today ran from 1988 to 1991 and lasted for 72 episodes. The unaired pilot episode, written by Lloyd J. Schwartz, explained the 22-year gap with an accident in Grandpa's lab that put the family to sleep. They awake in the late 1980s and must adapt to their new surroundings. The show features John Schuck (Herman), Lee Meriwether (Lily), Howard Morton (Grandpa) and Jason Marsden (Eddie). Marilyn was portrayed by Mary-Ellen Dunbar in the unaired pilot and by Hilary Van Dyke thereafter.

==== Mockingbird Lane ====
A reboot by Pushing Daisies creator Bryan Fuller was developed for NBC as a one-hour drama with "spectacular visuals." NBC ordered a pilot episode, and announced in January 2012 that it would be called Mockingbird Lane, a reference to the Munsters' address. NBC ultimately did not proceed with plans for Mockingbird Lane as a weekly series, but later announced that the pilot episode would air in late October 2012 as a Halloween special. NBC passed on the series over disagreements about the show's dark nature and inconsistent tone.

=== Unrealized projects ===
- In August 2004, it was announced that Keenen Ivory, Shawn, and Marlon Wayans had signed a deal to write and produce a modern-day film featuring the Munsters, but that they would not appear in it.
- In August 2017, it was announced that Seth Meyers was developing a modern-day interpretation of the series for NBC. The show would place the Munsters in Brooklyn, New York, where they try to adapt to life as an ordinary family. However, the show was not produced.

=== Music ===
In 1998, Rob Zombie released the single "Dragula". Its title was taken from the name of Grandpa's dragster DRAG-U-LA. The music video mimics, in parts, the Munsters taking a ride in the car.

In 2003, the American band Type O Negative released their sixth album, Life Is Killing Me. The first song is a short instrumental titled Thir13teen. The song is based on short pieces of music from the show that is played when one scene transitions to another. The band credits Jack Marshall as the songwriter.

A sample of the show's theme-song guitar riff was used in the song "Uma Thurman" by Fall Out Boy.

== Home media ==
Between 2004 and 2008, Universal Studios Home Entertainment released the entire series on DVD in Regions 1 & 2.

DVD name	Ep#	Region 1	Region 2	Region 4	Additional information
Season 1	38	August 24, 2004; February 5, 2013 (re-released)	October 17, 2005	November 30, 2006	Original unaired pilot; Dual-sided discs (Region 1 only)
Season 2	32	October 25, 2005; February 5, 2013 (re-released)	May 1, 2006	October 25, 2006	America's First Family of Fright; Fred Gwynne: More Than a Munster; Yvonne De Carlo: Gilded Lily; Al Lewis: Forever Grandpa; Dual-sided discs (Region 1 only)
The Complete Series	70	October 7, 2008; September 13, 2016 (re-released)	N/A	N/A	Original unaired pilot; America's First Family of Fright; Fred Gwynne: More Than a Munster; Yvonne De Carlo: Gilded Lily; Al Lewis: Forever Grandpa; "Family Portrait" (colorized version); Munster, Go Home; The Munsters' Revenge; 12 single-sided discs
The Complete Series (Closed Casket Collection)	70	N/A	October 8, 2007		Original unaired pilot; America's First Family of Fright; Fred Gwynne: More Than a Munster; Yvonne De Carlo: Gilded Lily; Al Lewis: Forever Grandpa; 12 single-sided discs
The Complete Series				August 3, 2016	The Munsters' Revenge; Here Come the Munsters; 12 single-sided discs

The "Family Portrait" episode in color, which was absent from the Season 1 and 2 standalone box sets, was released on a standalone Region 1 DVD on October 7, 2008.

== Merchandise ==
Cheerios commercial (1965).

Gold Key Comics produced a Munsters comic book that ran for 16 issues from January 1965 to January 1968 and featured photo covers from the TV series. When the series first appeared, the Comics Code Authority still forbade the appearance of vampires in comic books. However, because Gold Key was not a member of the Comics Magazine Association of America, it was not obligated to conform to the Comics Code, and Lily and Grandpa appeared in the comics without controversy.

Other merchandise included a set of rubber squeaky toys, Colorforms, and an Aurora model kit of the living room and family. AMT produced model kits of the Munster Koach and DRAG-U-LA. The Aurora model of the living room featured Herman in his electric chair, Eddie squatting in front of the fire, Lily knitting and Grandpa hanging in a bat-like manner from the rafters. Marilyn was not included. ERTL later produced a very detailed 1:18 scale diecast of the Munster Koach. Mattel issued two Herman Munster dolls: one was a talking doll and the other was a hand puppet (both with rings that could be pulled to make them talk utilizing Gwynne's actual voice) that were issued from 1964 until around 1968.

A video game based on The Munsters was published by Again, Again (a division of Alternative Software) in 1989. It was available for the Amstrad CPC, ZX Spectrum, Commodore 64, Amiga, Atari ST, MSX, and MS-DOS, but it was criticized by the gaming press because of its short length and lackluster gameplay.

In 1990, Atari Corporation released Midnight Mutants for the Atari 7800, featuring Al Lewis' likeness in his Grampa Munster character on the box and label. However, as Atari had reached an agreement with Universal, they could not call him Grampa Munster, so he was simply called Grampa.

In 1966, a three-reel View-Master set featuring The Munsters episode "The Most Beautiful Ghoul in the World" was released, accompanied by a booklet containing drawings and additional text. The set is notable because the photographs provide rare color views of the characters and sets, including house interiors, Grandpa's dungeon laboratory and the characters' heavy greenish-white facial makeup.

== See also ==
- Vampire films
- List of vampire television series

== Works ==
- Joe Connelly and Bob Mosher. (1964). The Munsters. Hollywood: Columbia Broadcasting System (CBS).
- Cox, Stephen (2006). The Munsters: A Trip Down Mockingbird Lane. Watson-Guptill. ISBN 978-0-8230-7894-3.
- Patrick, Butch (2015). Munster Memories: A Mini Coffin Table Book. TV Classics Press. ISBN 978-1-936517-92-3.
