= DRAG-U-LA =

Car in the television show, The Munsters

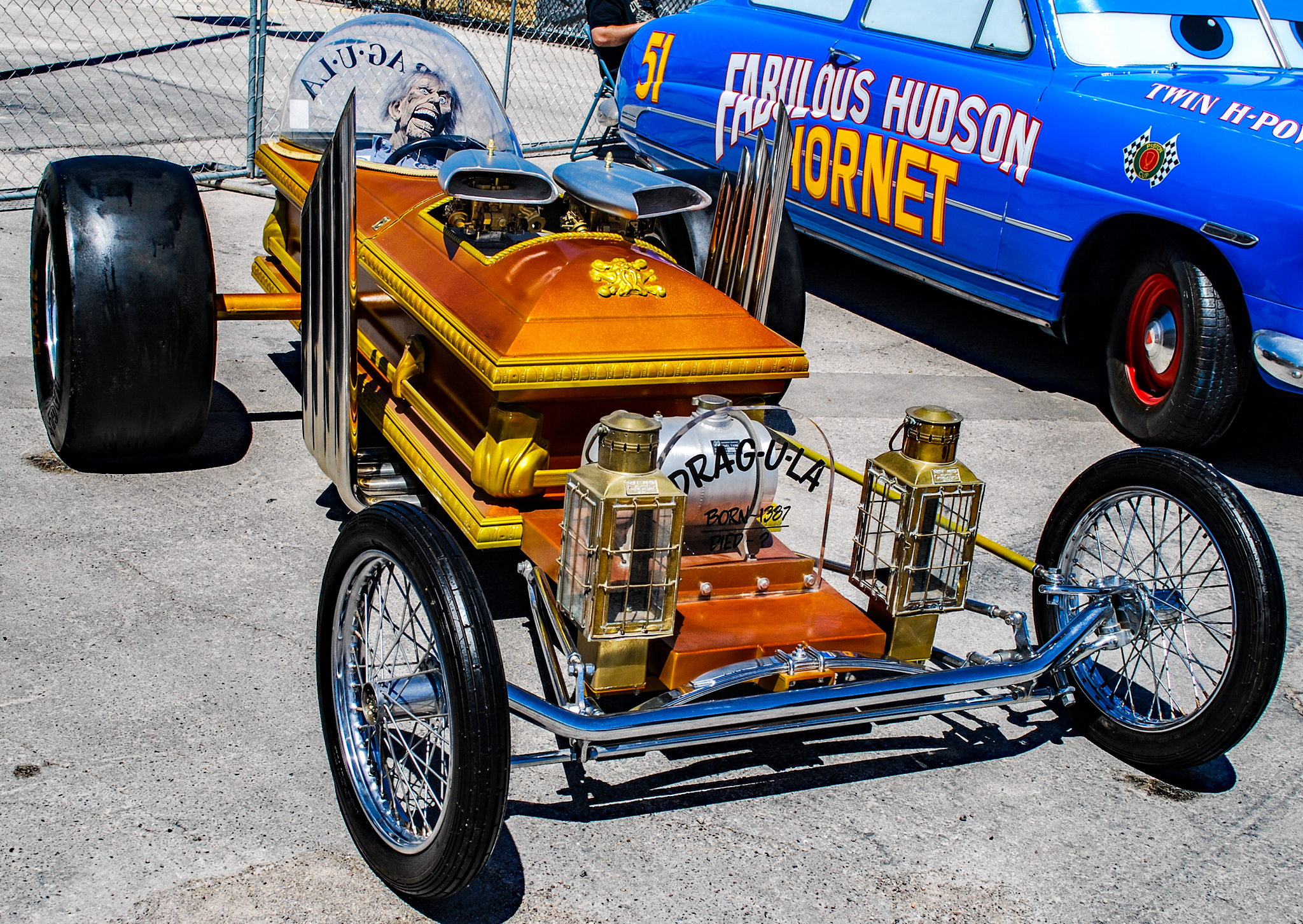
Recreation of DRAG-U-LA at a car show, 2018

DRAG-U-LA, along with the Munster Koach, was one of two cars on the television show The Munsters designed by prolific show car designer Tom Daniel while working for George Barris and Barris Kustom Industries.

== The car ==
The fiberglass body of DRAG-U-LA was built from a coffin that Richard "Korky" Korkes, Barris's project engineer, was able to purchase from a funeral home in North Hollywood. Korkes said in 2013 that it was illegal to sell a coffin without a death certificate, so he made a deal with the funeral director to pay in cash and have the coffin left outside the rear door to be collected after dark.

The car had a 350HP, 289ci Ford Mustang V-8 engine with a four-speed stick shift. It had two four-barrel carburetors mounted on a Edelbrock Ram-Thrust manifold. The carburetors were mounted backwards in an effort to save space and the pull type throttle actuation modified into a pusher type.

The rear tires were 10.00-15 Firestone racing slicks, mounted on custom 10-inch-wide Radir aluminum and steel wheels. Each hubcap was decorated with a large silver spider. The front tires were 4-inch Italian tires on Speedsport English buggy wire wheels. To extend the Gothic motif further, Barris installed four Zoomie style organ pipes on each side of the car in lieu of a standard exhaust pipe, and mounted antique lamps on the front and rear.

The front of the vehicle sported a marble gravestone—supposedly Grandpa Munster's license plate "from the Old Country"—with the inscription: "Born 1367, Died ?". A "hidden" radiator was topped with a small golden casket. The driver sat in the rear of the vehicle behind the engine, under a plastic bubble.

Subtle changes were made to the automobile, such as the tires, for different aspects of filming for the television series and for the movie Munster, Go Home!.

This car was sold at the closeout auction of the Chicago Historical Antique Automobile Museum in Highland Park, Illinois, in 1985.

The original 1966 car was housed in Planet Hollywood in Atlantic City, New Jersey, where it hung from the ceiling. Upon the closing of the Atlantic City location, the car was auctioned off to John Sbrigato, who also owns a Munster Koach.

It currently stands on display in Gatlinburg, Tennessee's Hollywood Star Cars Museum.

== In The Munsters ==
On The Munsters television series, the car was created by Grandpa so he could win back the Munster Koach, which Herman had lost in a drag race in the episode "Hot Rod Herman".

The 1966 movie Munster, Go Home! features an alternate origin. After Herman crashes a Jaguar limousine owned (and raced) by the Munster family of England, Grandpa builds the DRAG-U-LA, using the motor from the Munster Koach, so Herman can drive it in a cross-country automobile race.
