= Madera Speedway =

Motorsport track in the United States

- Location: 1850 Cleveland Avenue; Madera, California; 93637
- Coordinates: 36°58′20″N 120°04′35″W
- Owner: Madera District Fair (1972–present)
- Operator: Kenny Shepherd (2007–present)
- Broke ground: February 24, 1972; 54 years ago
- Opened: June 25, 1972; 54 years ago
- Former names: Madera Raceways (1972–1976)
- Major events: Current: ARCA Menards West Series; Madera 150 (1973, 1989, 1995–1996, 2003, 2009, 2023–present); Former: NASCAR Southwest Series (1987–1989, 1995–2004)
- Website: racemadera.com

Oval (1972–present)
- Surface: Asphalt
- Length: 0.333 mi (0.536 km)
- Turns: 4
- Banking: Turns: 6-12° Straights: 6°

Madera Speedway (formerly known as Madera Raceways from 1972 to 1976) is a 0.333 mi (0.536 km) oval short track in Madera, California. The facility has hosted a variety of events since its opening in 1972, including NASCAR-sanctioned events. The track is owned by the Madera District Fair as part of the Madera District Fairgrounds and led by track president and promoter Kenny Shepherd.

Prior to the construction of the current Madera Speedway, motorsports events were held at the Madera District Fairgrounds since the 1930s. In 1971, plans were announced for the construction of the current Madera Speedway, which was completed and opened in June of the following year. After being run by private operators for a decade, the track's operations was taken over by the Madera District Fair. After persistent financial struggles, motorsport businessmen Ken Clapp and Rick Gerhardt took over in 1995, helping stabilize the track's financial situation in the following decade. In 2006, under threat of closure due to surrounding commercial development, Madera Speedway's operations was taken over by former racing driver Kenny Shepherd, who made various renovations and revitalized the track in the following years.

== Description ==
=== Configuration ===
Madera Speedway is measured at 0.333 mi (0.536 km), with a progressive banking system of 6–12° on the track's turns and a banking system of 6° on the track's straights.

=== Amenities ===
Madera Speedway is located in Madera, California, and served by California State Route 99.

== Track history ==
=== Previous racing at the Madera Fairgrounds ===
The first races on the Madera District Fairgrounds occurred in 1939, with motorcycle races occurring on a 1/2 mi (0.80 km) dirt track. The first race occurred on April 30, with Jimmy Kelley winning the first main event. On March 19, 1947, The Fresno Bee reported that midget races sanctioned by the Bay Cities Racing Association would make a debut at a newly constructed 1/4 mi (0.40 km) dirt oval at the Madera District Fairgrounds on March 23. The first race was run as scheduled, with Ed Normi winning the first feature event at the track. After the first race, track officials announced the track's paving on the 29th, with the first paved race occurring the day after. According to The Fresno Bee, the track was located across the street from where the current Madera Speedway is located. The track operated for 25 years; after the current track was constructed, it was demolished and replaced with a California Highway Patrol station. According to current track president Kenny Shepherd, a Walmart store currently occupies the old track location.

=== Early years ===
In January 1971, The Fresno Bee reported that a group in Madera planned to construct a new track at the Madera District Fairgrounds; at the time, numerous tracks in the San Joaquin Valley were being proposed. At a fair board meeting on April 19, construction to build a 1/3 mi (0.54 km) banked track was unanimously approved by the board, with Fresno trucking company employee Pete Marovich appointed as the first promoter of the then-named "Madera Raceways". Although planned to open "within six to eight weeks" of the approval, by January 1972, no work had been completed on the facility. Groundbreaking on Madera Raceways occurred on February 24, with a new opening date scheduled for either April or May of that year. The opening was further delayed to June 25.

The first single-day event at Madera Raceways was held on June 25, 1972, with Larry Yarimie winning the first feature event at the track. After Marovich's five-year lease ended, then-Clovis Speedway promoter Blackie Gejeian signed a five-year lease starting in 1977. At the start of his tenure, Gejeian renamed the track to "Madera Speedway". Under Gejeian's tenure, average attendance rose by over 1,000 people per event within the span of three years. At the end of Gejeian's lease, the Madera District Fair took over operations for the track, with fair secretary-manager Jim Pacini taking over as promoter. On May 4, 1982, Madera Speedway oversaw its first fatality when racing driver Danny Bingham crashed at the first turn due to a stuck throttle, dying due to head injuries. Under the fair's control, various renovations were made in the following years. Before the start of the 1982 racing season, new lights were installed and both the track surface and the track's pit area were repaved. The following year, a seating capacity expansion of 1,200 seats was constructed alongside a new pit exit gate. In 1984, the bottom of turns two and four were paved and lights were installed on the track's pit area and parking lot.

By the end of 1985, doubts over the track's future were raised due to low car counts and low attendance leading to the track operating on a financial loss. As a result, the Madera District Fair board setting a vote on November 25 on whether or not to continue racing at Madera Speedway. The board voted to continue racing under certain conditions, which included cutting the number of supermodified races and reducing the track's budget. In addition, racing promoter Ken Coventry was hired as promoter starting for the 1986 season. The track's financial situation improved under Coventry's first season, with the track's racing program adding more events for 1987. In 1991, a $30,000 scoreboard was installed on the outside of track's third and fourth turns; according to Coventry, he had wanted to install a scoreboard for the past three years but struggled to get stable funding for the project. In October 1993, with annual profits dropping by "nearly $100,000" within a year, the Madera District Fair Board elected to search for a new promoter; Coventry stated that the decline was due to economic factors. Two months later, Coventry was replaced by Roland Jones, a student services regional director at National University's Sacramento campus.

=== Clapp and Gerhardt years ===
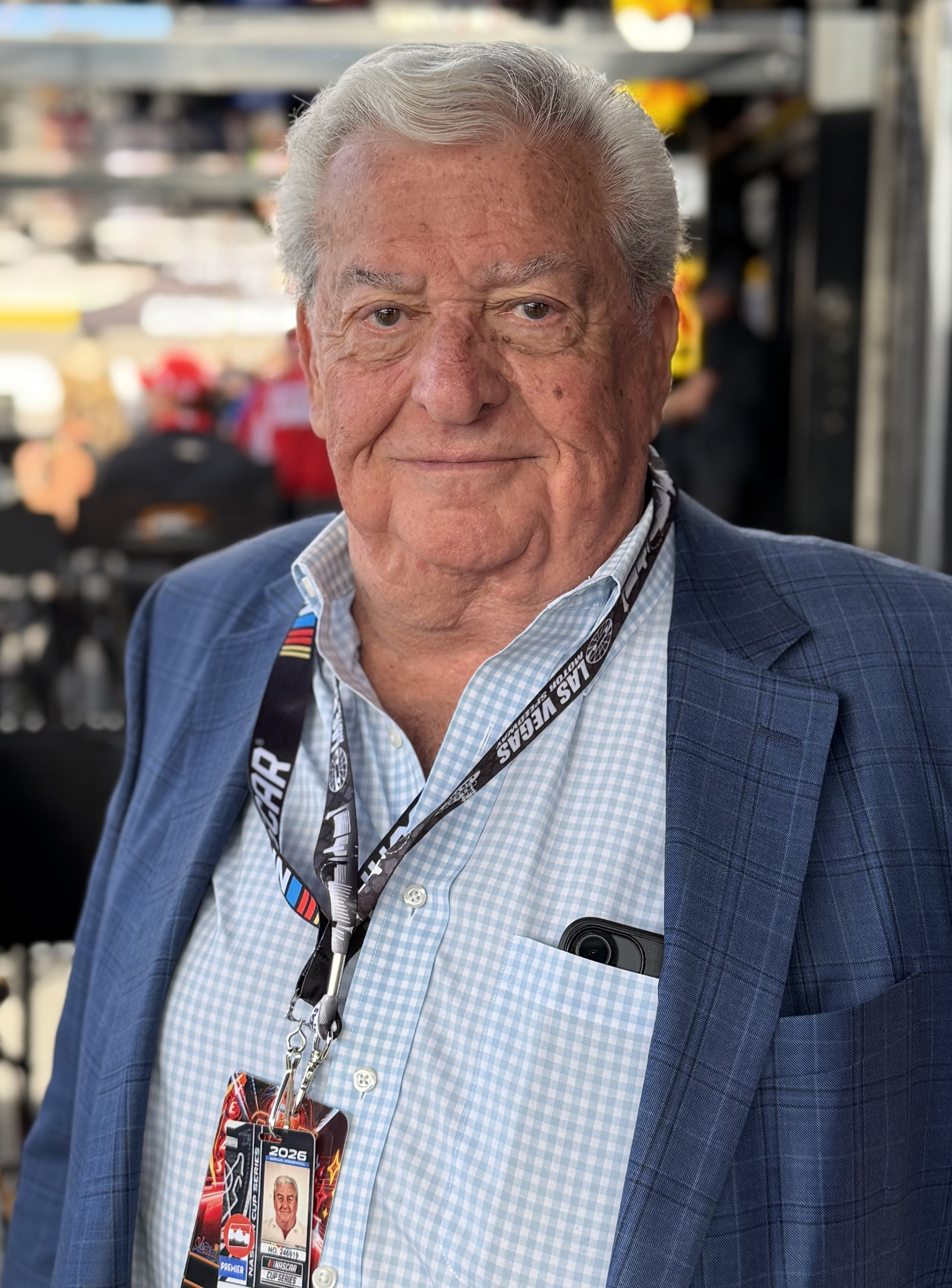
Motorsports businessman Ken Clapp (pictured in 2026) alongside tire distributor Rick Gerhardt held co-promoter duties at Madera Speedway from 1995 to 2004.

On July 20, 1994, the Madera District Fair Board unanimously elected to give operational control of Madera Speedway to Madera Speedway, Inc. starting in 1995. The company, led by racing promoter, then-NASCAR vice president of western operations, and Stockton 99 Speedway co-owner Ken Clapp and Fresno tire distributor Rick Gerhardt, was able to run races under the sanction of NASCAR, with board chief Dean Hargrove stating that the new company had brought "virtually assured $90,000 [profit]" for the fair. According to Clapp, he was originally asked for help to revitalize the track by track operator Elizabeth Williams after the track had struggled under several previous operators. Later, Gerhardt, a friend of Clapp, partnered to operate the track because "both of us thought it was important [motorsport] to maintain a presence in the Fresno area". Clapp additionally stated in his autobiography, "I always loved Madera's location, right alongside busy Highway 99".

Under the first year of the duo's operation, the track experienced declining attendance and low car counts, which was blamed on a declining economy and poor weather during that year's spring season. On April 6, 1997, Madera Speedway oversaw its second fatality when racing driver Tom Boune crashed at the track's third turn due to a stuck throttle during a midget car race, flipping after hitting the retaining wall at nearly full speed with the car catching on fire after the wreck. Boune died instantly due to spinal cord and head injuries. In 2000, new concrete retaining walls were installed to replace the existing wooden retaining barriers around the track. Sometime during Gerhardt's tenure, Clapp left the partnership due to being preoccupied with other duties and that "Rick– who, being local, was able to be there so much more than I was".

=== Kenny Shepherd takeover, revitalization ===
By 2004 and at the end of Gerhardt's lease, Gerhardt stated that although he was busy with his tire distributor business, he was considering "several possibilities". In November 2004, the Madera District Fair Board rehired Coventry as general manager of Madera Speedway and Williams as president and chief executive officer; Williams was later listed as promoter and lessee. On September 20, 2006, the Madera District Fair board terminated Williams' lease of Madera Speedway effective at the end of the 2006 racing season on an 8–1 vote, ending the lease three years early in the wake of commercial development near the track that had the potential to expand and subsequently close the facility. In response, Williams threatened to sue the fair board. The following day, fair board chief executive officer (CEO) Scott Samples stated that due to commercial development occurring on what was the track's parking lot, the track was scheduled to temporarily close for 2007 with the intention of reopening in 2008. However, in November, Samples stated that he was "95% sure" a six-month season in 2007 was possible due to finalized construction plans for commercial development not occurring on the track's parking lot.

In early December, then-promoter of the Altamont Raceway Park, a partner in the eventual-failed Riverside Motorsports Park project, and former racing driver Kenny Shepherd announced plans to submit a bid to become Madera Speedway's promoter. Shepherd, the only person to submit a full proposal, was accepted as the track promoter for 2007, scheduling a 22-race season. Shepherd's first season as promoter was successful; despite some concerns over further commercial development, Shepherd stated that the season "exceeded my expectations". Shepherd later stated that for the first three years of his tenure, the track was in "survival mode", with focus given towards redeveloping the track's fan amenities. Clapp, former promoter of Madera Speedway and Shepherd's mentor, described Shepherd in his autobiography as "fanatical about maintaining the facility. He puts a lot of emphasis on the cleanliness of restrooms, and whether the lawn is freshly mowed and weeded; a single weed is one weed too many." Shepherd's lease was renewed for another five-year lease starting in 2012; with the renewal, the track was repaved. On August 11, 2018, Madera Speedway oversaw its third fatality when racing driver Donnie Large Sr. died during a supermodified race, possibly suffering a heart attack and subsequently crashing on the 21st lap of the event.

== Events and uses ==
Madera Speedway currently hosts annual regional NASCAR-sanctioned ARCA Menards West Series events, which it has regularly hosted since 2023. The track also hosts various local racing and INEX divisions, including pro late model, junior late model, sportsman, legends car, and bandolero divisions. Madera Speedway is notable for its junior late model series, a developmental series created by track president Kenny Shepherd in 2016 that allows racing drivers from 10 to 16 years old to race in late models.
