= Edelbrock =

American automotive aftermarket company

Edelbrock, LLC
- Type: Private company
- Industry: Automotive aftermarket
- Founded: Beverly Hills, California, USA (1938)
- Founder: Victor Edelbrock, Sr.
- Headquarters: Olive Branch, Mississippi
- Key people: Chris Douglas, President and CEO
- Products: Automotive parts Motorcycle Parts
- Number of employees: 624 (2018)
- Divisions: Automotive & Motorcycle; Carburetor Division; Sand Cast Foundry; Permanent Mold Foundry; Southern California Tech Center; Edelbrock Race Center
- Website: edelbrock.com

Edelbrock, LLC is an American manufacturer of specialty automotive and motorcycle parts. The company is headquartered in Olive Branch, Mississippi, with a Southern California R&D Tech Center located in Cerritos, CA. The Edelbrock Sand Cast and Permanent Mold Manufacturing foundries are located in San Jacinto, CA. Edelbrock has two facilities in North Carolina: the Edelbrock Carburetor Division in Sanford, and the Edelbrock Race Center in Mooresville.

Vic Edelbrock founded the corporation in 1938 when his desire to increase the performance of his 1932 Ford Roadster led him to design a new intake manifold. Friends and fellow drivers soon wanted one as well. This transformed his repair garage into a parts manufacturing enterprise, making aftermarket equipment for automobiles.

== History ==
=== Origins ===
Edelbrock's garage on the corner of Hancock and Avalon in Los Angeles. ca. 1930s

Vic Edelbrock Sr. was born in a small farming community of Eudora, Kansas in 1913. After the family grocery store burned down in 1927, he left school at the age of 14 to help support the family by ferrying Model T Fords from Wichita to the many outlying farms in the area. He made frequent stops to replace parts that shook loose on the region's dirt roads. Soon after, he found work in a local repair shop, working as an auto mechanic.

During the Great Depression, in 1931, Edelbrock went to California to live with his brother, Carl. Initially, he moved in with his brother and took a job as an auto mechanic. In order to earn some extra money to open his own repair shop, Edelbrock took an evening job in downtown Los Angeles parking cars at a large apartment complex. It was a chance encounter at this parking complex where he bumped into the 19-year-old Irish woman, Katherine (Katie) Collins, who was working as a day maid. Despite the fact that Katie was engaged, Edelbrock convinced her to give him a chance and not marry her fiancé. Vic and Katie married in June 1933, just eight weeks after meeting.

As a 22-year-old, Edelbrock teamed up with his new brother-in-law to open his first automobile repair shop on Wilshire Boulevard in Beverly Hills. Business flourished and in 1934 Edelbrock moved into his own shop on the corner of Venice Blvd and Hoover in Los Angeles. Business continued to grow rapidly and he moved his shop three more times in the 1930s. In 1936, Katie Edelbrock gave birth to Vic, Jr., the couple's only child.

=== The Slingshot ===
Edelbrock's first commercial product: The Slingshot manifold

In 1938 Vic Edelbrock bought his first project car, a 1932 Ford Roadster. In his desire to increase the performance, he joined with Tommy Thickstun to design a new intake manifold for the roadster's flathead engine. Unhappy with the performance of that manifold, Edelbrock designed his own, nicknamed The Slingshot. Most importantly, the new manifold allowed two Stromberg 97 carburetors to be used, eliminating a bottleneck that limited the engine's horsepower. The manifold was tested for quality at the Muroc dry lake (occupied today by Edwards Air Force Base), which was a testing ground for Edelbrock and many other car clubs and racing associations. On November 16, 1941, after stripping off the fenders and hubcaps, Edelbrock set a national speed record in the flying quarter mile with a speed of 121.45 mph (195.45 km/h). Originally, he had no intention of producing any additional manifolds, but the response following his speed runs in the 1932 Ford prompted Edelbrock to make more. This was the first product that he sold commercially and marked the beginning of the company as it is known today. Edelbrock ultimately manufactured 100 of the Slingshot manifolds.

=== Early years ===
Edelbrock's first catalog (1946)

During World War II, Edelbrock's machinist skills were put to work in the Todd Shipyards in Long Beach, hand fabricating and welding aircraft parts. The Office of Defense Transportation placed a ban on auto racing during the war. Edelbrock designed and developed a new line of products. After the war, he produced aluminum racing cylinder heads, in addition to manifolds, which quickly gained notability among hot rodding hobbyists. Parts to increase an engine's performance were not readily available at that time, so racers built their own. Soon Edelbrock found himself building pieces first for his friends and then for customers.

To deal with the amount of mail he was receiving by 1946, Edelbrock created the company's first catalog, Edelbrock Power and Speed Equipment, with the help of Robert E. "Pete" Petersen. This hastened the transformation of the Edelbrock company from a repair garage into a performance parts manufacturer. In 1947, Edelbrock produced the first cylinder heads for the Ford flathead.

One of the first companies to use an engine dynamometer, Edelbrock moved to a 5,000 sq ft shop in 1949 to develop manifolds, cylinder heads and racing pistons. In the early 1950s, he continued racing research at the dry lake beds and expanded his racing to the Bonneville Speedway.

=== Racing ===
After the war, the California Roadster Association (CRA) was formed to run auto races with roadsters that raced on oval track and attempted land speed records on dry lakes. After World War II, the CRA began sanctioning sprint car races. In 1946, Edelbrock decided to expand his involvement into midget car racing, purchasing a car made by Frank Kurtis. In addition to racing the car, he wanted a test bench for the racing products he was developing. Edelbrock's team toured the dirt track racing circuit of Southern California with flathead mechanic Bobby Meeks tuning the cars. Many famous drivers were part of the Edelbrock team, including Walt Faulkner (first rookie to win pole at the Indy 500), Bill Vukovich (Indy 500 winner in ’53 and ’54), Rodger Ward (Indy 500 winner in ’59 and ’62), Cal Niday, Perry Grimm, Danny Oakes, Harry Stockman and Bill Zaring.

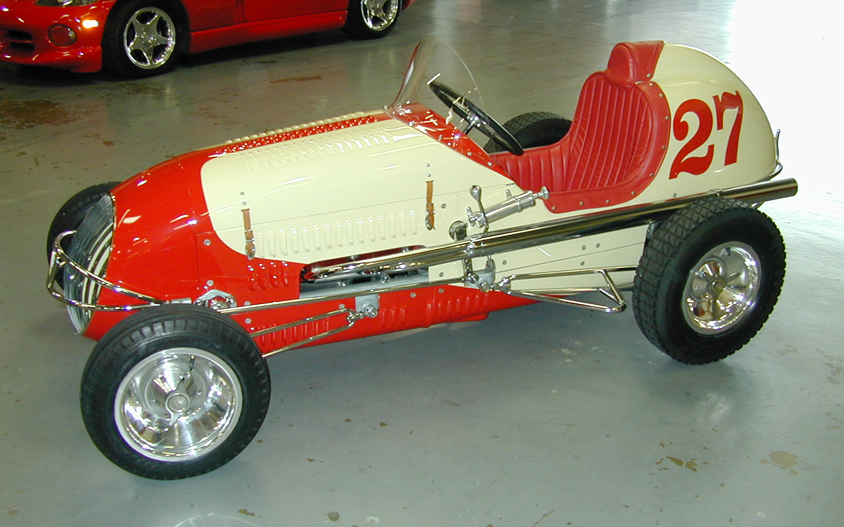
The famed No. 27 Edelbrock midget racing car

Edelbrock had success against the Offenhauser-powered midget cars that had dominated midget car racing for several years; a feat because Offenhausers had a significant power advantage over other engines. Using his Kurtis Kraft V8-60 "shaker" midget car powered by a secret blend of 20% nitromethane (disguised with the scent of orange oil), Rodger Ward's Edelbrock-powered #27 car broke the winning streak of the "Offy"-equipped midget cars at Gilmore Stadium on August 10, 1950, the track that originated midget car racing. This was the only V8-60 to ever beat the Offys in the Gilmore 386-Race history. The same car raced at the Orange Show Stadium in San Bernardino the following night, again beating the Offenhauser cars. It was never duplicated in the history of midget racing. Edelbrock was not the only racer in that era to experiment with nitromethane; fellow racers Joaquin Arnett and Tony Capanna tried it in their hot rods, as well. Edelbrock is generally considered to be the mechanic who made the volatile fuel work.

=== Turning points ===
Edelbrock's best selling product: The Chevy small-block intake manifold

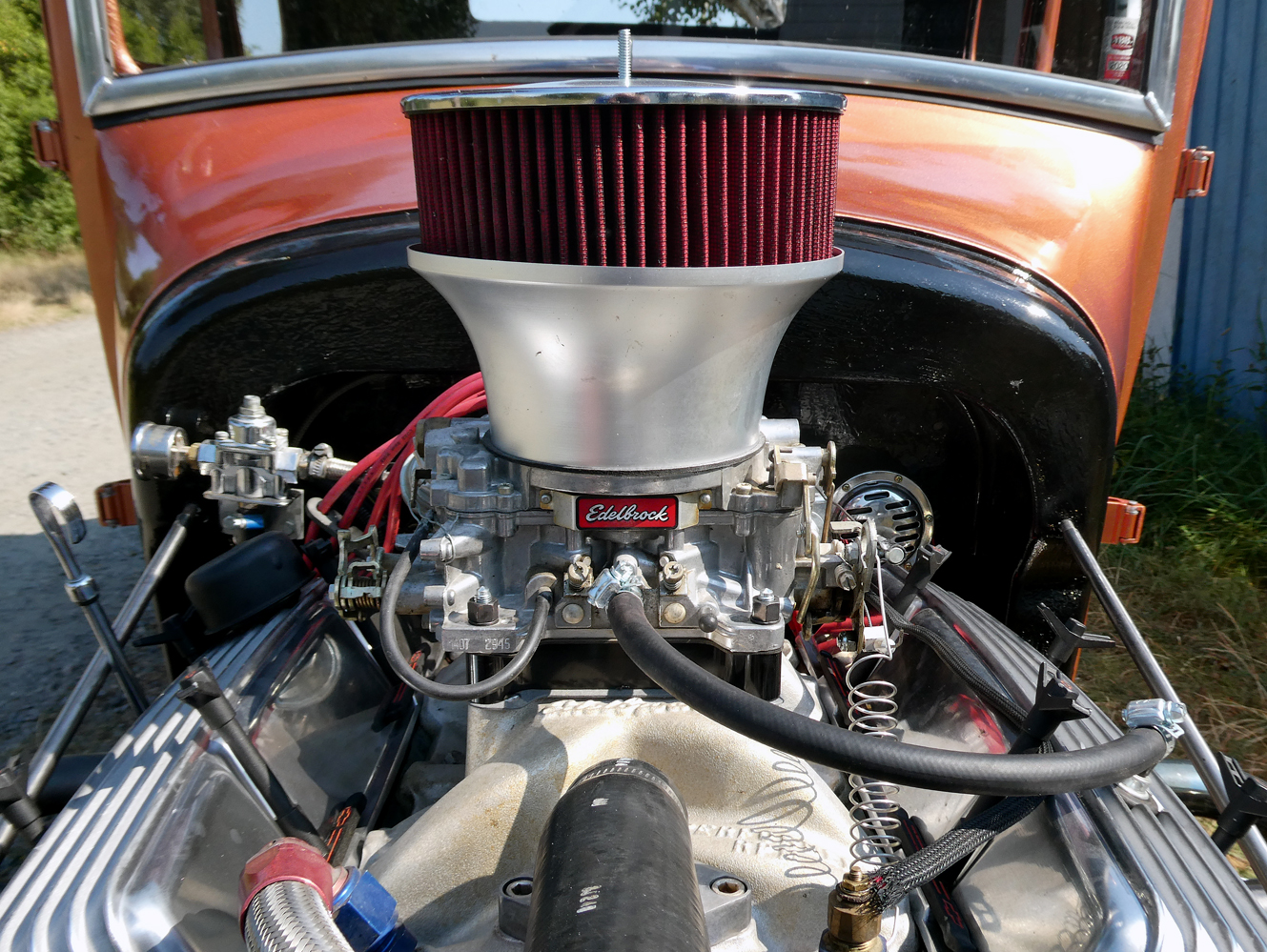
Edelbrock carburetor

Until 1955, Edelbrock made parts only for the Ford Motor Company. Few things affected the company (as well as the development of the hot rod market) more than the development of the Chevrolet small-block engine (now referenced by the retronym Gen I as to distinguish between generations of the Chevrolet engine) in 1955. Chevrolet delivered three small block engines to Edelbrock for experimentation. He used one engine for testing on a dynamometer and another to test multi-carb manifolds for magazine articles. He prepared the third engine for boat builder Henry Lauterback, who set two world records in Miami, Florida.

In 1958, Edelbrock extracted one horsepower per cubic-inch from a 283 cid small-block Chevy that was equipped with his newly designed Cross Ram Manifold. This led him to begin producing manifolds for Pontiac and Chrysler engines.

Another critical turning point in the company's history was the 1964 decision to build a four-barrel intake manifold for the small-block Chevrolet. The C-4B manifold, developed with help from Bob Joehnck, opened the door to a new line of performance products. Although competing with the factory was a risky proposition, it turned out to be a beneficial one, as it allowed the company to expand into a new market.

=== Growth ===
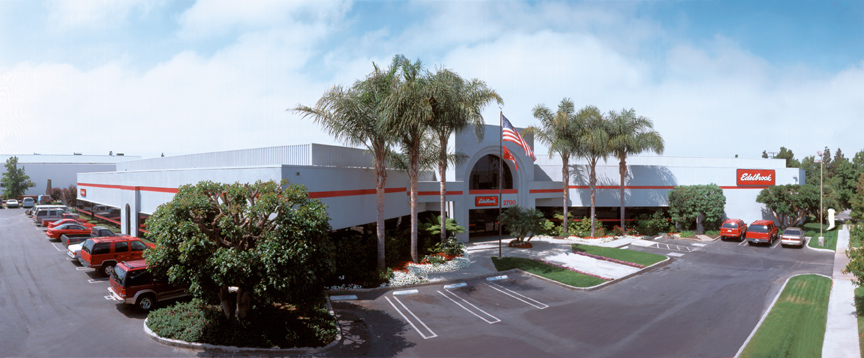
Edelbrock's corporate headquarters in Torrance, California

In 1962, cancer claimed the life of Victor Edelbrock, Sr. at the age of 49. At the time, the company consisted of ten employees and annual sales were $450,000. Edelbrock was succeeded by his son, 26-year-old Vic Edelbrock, Jr. Vic Jr., who had graduated with a degree in business from USC in 1958, became president and chief executive officer, a position he held until 2010.

The company joined SEMA (the Specialty Equipment Market Association) as a charter member in the 1960s, with Vic Edelbrock, Jr. serving as SEMA president from 1971 to 1974. Edelbrock had been elected in a crucial time in the history of SEMA; Congress enacted the Clean Air Act in 1971 and established the Environmental Protection Agency, which in part targeted the air pollution caused by internal combustion engines.

When gas prices soared in the 1970s, Edelbrock produced its Streetmaster line of intake manifolds that featured improved mileage, as well as performance.

In 1987, Edelbrock moved its facilities to its current location in Torrance, California. The five-building corporate facility occupies over 400,000 square feet (37,000 m^{2}). In 1990, Edelbrock built a 73,000-square-foot (6,800 m^{2}) sand-cast aluminum foundry in San Jacinto, which employed 75 to 100 workers, and gave the company the ability to increase production according to market demands.

In 1994, the Edelbrock corporation went public, selling shares of stock on the NASDAQ stock exchange. This initially raised $21 million, which was used mainly for construction of a new exhaust division in Torrance near its main facilities.

Russell logo

In 2000, Russell Performance Plumbing, a company that manufactures fittings and hoses, was acquired by Edelbrock. The company, which had been based in Florida, was relocated to Torrance by 2001.

As of June 30, 2004, the company employed 722 persons, and achieved revenues of $125.98 million USD. Since the company went private again in 2004, revenue findings have not been available to the general public.

On June 7, 2010, the Chicago-based private equity firm Industrial Opportunity Partners (IOP) acquired Edelbrock Corporation.

In January 2021, the company announced that its headquarters would be relocated to the Memphis, Tennessee region.

== Modern-day racing ==
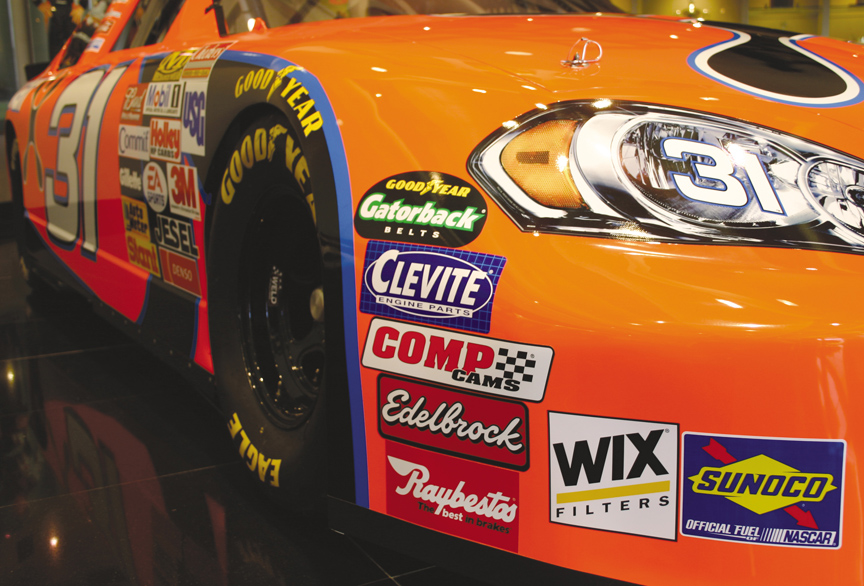
The Edelbrock sticker on a NASCAR racecar

The Edelbrock logo is prevalent in NASCAR but the company does not sponsor a racing team. Instead it engages in advertising through a $250,000 per year (2004) contract with NASCAR by which the Edelbrock contingency sticker is placed on every NASCAR race car. Contingency is a common form of "after the fact" sponsorship whereby racers place stickers on their vehicles from companies that post monetary awards to racing teams for winning, in exchange for the right to use images of winning drivers and their cars in promotional literature and advertising.

Edelbrock also posts contingency awards for drag racers, including NHRA sportsman categories. Since 2002, Edelbrock has been the title sponsor of the PRO Edelbrock Drag Racing Series, which features both professional and sportsman racing classes. The racing series includes seven classes of heads-up style racing and three classes of index style racing.

In 2021, Edelbrock partnered with Ilmor to build engines for the Superstar Racing Experience. Using the Ilmor 396 as a base, Edelbrock provides components such as the camshaft and ignition coils.

== Products ==
Eighty years after Vic Edelbrock Sr. manufactured the first Flathead Ford intake manifold, the Edelbrock company now designs and manufactures camshaft and lifter kits, carburetors, crate engines, cylinder heads, electronic fuel injection, engine blocks, engine dress-up, fuel pumps, intake manifolds, nitrous oxide injection, power packages, superchargers, top end kits, valvetrain, and water pumps. The company relies on online and catalog resellers along with traditional brick-and-mortar retailers. In 2018, Edelbrock launched a direct-to-consumer e-commerce website.

== Timeline ==
- 1931 – Edelbrock moves to California
- 1934 – Edelbrock moves into a shop on Venice and Hoover in Los Angeles
- 1938 – Edelbrock moves to the Breawood Garage in Los Angeles
- 1938 – Edelbrock buys a 1932 Ford Roadster and designs the first Edelbrock product, the Slingshot manifold
- 1941 – Edelbrock sets land speed record in a V8 roadster September 28
- 1941–45 – Edelbrock contributes to the WWII war effort by fabricating parts in the Long Beach shipyard
- 1945 – Edelbrock designs his first aluminum racing cylinder heads for flathead Fords
- 1945 – Vic Sr. purchased first building with machine shop on N. Highland in Hollywood, California
- 1946 – First Edelbrock catalog published
- 1948 – Edelbrock purchases a Clayton engine dynamometer
- 1949 — Edelbrock moves to its first purpose-built shop called Edelbrock Equipment Co. on Jefferson Blvd. in Los Angeles
- 1951 – The first streamliner powered by a Flathead Ford to go over 200 mph (320 km/h) is the Edelbrock-equipped Bachelor-Xydias So-Cal Special
- 1958 – Edelbrock is the first to achieve one horsepower per cubic inch
- 1962 – Vic Edelbrock, Jr. takes control of company when Vic Sr. dies of cancer at age 49
- 1963 – Edelbrock celebrates 25 Years in business
- 1968 – Edelbrock moves to El Segundo, California
- 1971–74 – Vic Edelbrock, Jr. elected president of SEMA
- 1973 – Edelbrock becomes a major sponsor of NASCAR
- 1975 – Car Craft names Edelbrock "Manufacturer of the Year"
- 1984 – Edelbrock awarded PWA Manufacturer of the Year
- 1986 – First Cylinder Head was produced
- 1987 – Edelbrock moves to Torrance, California
- 1988 – Edelbrock celebrates 50 Years in business
- 1989 – Edelbrock awarded PWA Manufacturer of the Year
- 1990 – Sand cast aluminum foundry built in San Jacinto, California
- 1990 – Edelbrock awarded PWA Manufacturer of the Year
- 1994 – Edelbrock goes public on the NASDAQ stock exchange. An exhaust division is formed.
- 1995 – Edelbrock acquires Qwiksilver II and begins manufacturing Harley-Davidson motorcycle products
- 1997 – Edelbrock opens a state-of-the-art Sand Cast Aluminum Foundry
- 1999 – New distribution center opens, including Vic's Garage, a museum of Edelbrock's cars
- 1999 – Forbes names Edelbrock as one of the 200 best small companies
- 2000 – Forbes names Edelbrock as one of the 200 best small companies for the second year in a row
- 2000–01 – Edelbrock acquires Russell Performance Plumbing
- 2004 – Edelbrock returns to being a Private company
- 2007 – Edelbrock begins construction of a Permanent Mold Aluminum foundry
- 2008 – Edelbrock awarded PWA Manufacturer of the Year
- 2008 - Edelbrock acquires Lunati.
- 2010 – Industrial Opportunity Partners strategically invests in the Edelbrock Corporation
- 2011 – Edelbrock sells its line of suspension components to QA1
- 2012 – Edelbrock acquires SX Performance
- 2017 – Vic Edelbrock, Jr. dies at age 80.
- 2017 – Edelbrock awarded CAN (formerly PWA) Manufacturer of the Year
- 2018 – Edelbrock celebrates 80 Years in business
- 2018 – First Edelbrock diesel cylinder head produced
- 2020 – Edelbrock opens the Edelbrock Race Center in North Carolina that will focus on race-oriented cylinder head machining
- 2020 – Edelbrock and Competition Cams merge, creating a new platform company owned by Industrial Opportunity Partners
- 2020 – Edelbrock divests its nitrous oxide category to Nitrous Supply
- 2021 – The Edelbrock Group is formed, consisting of COMP Cams, Edelbrock, FAST Fuel Air Spark Technology, Russell Performance and TCI Automotive
- 2021 – Edelbrock corporate headquarters, manufacturing and distribution center move to new 300,000-square-foot facility in metropolitan Memphis (Olive Branch, MS)
- 2021 – Edelbrock expansion includes new Southern California Tech Center located in Cerritos, CA
- 2021 – Edelbrock introduces Pro-Flo 4+ EFI Engine Management System
