= Stockton 99 Speedway =

Motorsport track in the United States

- Location: 4105 North Wilson Way; Stockton, California; 95205
- Coordinates: 37°59′48″N 121°15′53″W
- Capacity: 6,000
- Owner: Hunefeld family and Ken Clapp (1977–present)
- Operator: Tony Noceti (2009–present)
- Former names: 99 Stadium (early years)
- Major events: Former: ARCA Menards West Series; Stockton 150 (1966, 1968, 1970–1974, 1978, 1980–1983, 2002–2006, 2012–2014); NASCAR Southwest Series (1986–1996, 2002–2006)
- Website: stockton99.com

Oval
- Surface: Asphalt
- Length: 0.250 mi (0.402 km)
- Turns: 4

Stockton 99 Speedway (currently branded as The New Stockton 99 Speedway; formerly known as the 99 Stadium in early years) is a 0.250 mi (0.402 km) oval short track in Stockton, California. The facility has hosted a variety of events since its opening in 1947, including motorsports events sanctioned by NASCAR and the CARS Tour West. Stockton 99 Speedway is owned by majority owner Chris Hunefeld and minority owner Ken Clapp, and led by track promoter Tony Noceti.

Built in 1947 by a group of Stockton businessmen, Stockton 99 Speedway opened in May 1947 as a dirt track under control from the Hunefeld family and Stanley Moore. The track's existence as a short-track was short-lived, and lasted for less than a year before the track was paved in time for the 1948 racing season. In 1954, Bob Barkhimer bought 40% of the track's ownership from Moore, bringing NASCAR-sanctioned race to the track under Bob Barkhimer Associates (BBA). 23 years later, Barkhimer's share was bought out by Ken Clapp, who purchased BBA (now known as California Auto Racing Speedways). In 2006, the track was closed after being sold to Wilson Way Development who intended to demolish the facility to build a housing development; however, they went bankrupt in the wake of the subprime mortgage crisis. After the track was given back to its previous owners, French Camp businessman Tony Noceti began leasing the track in 2009, reopening the track for motorsports the same year after making renovations.

== Description ==
=== Configuration ===
Stockton 99 Speedway is measured at 0.250 mi (0.402 km).

=== Amenities ===
Stockton 99 Speedway is located in Stockton, California, and served by California State Route 99. As of 2023, the track has a seating capacity of 6,000 according to Comstock's.

== Track history ==
=== First years ===
On March 6, 1947, The Record reported that incorporation papers were filed by Stanley S. Moore, William "Billy" H. Hunefeld, and Len H. Honey to build "99 Stadium", a midget car racing track and sports stadium with a seating capacity of 10,000. Work on the 99 Stadium, which had a projected cost of $125,000 (adjusted for inflation, $1,802,347), started in March and was completed in mid-May. On May 7, an opening date of May 27 was announced to The Record. 99 Stadium opened as scheduled, with Bill Vukovich winning the first feature event at the track: a midget car race. The first motorcycles races at the facility were held a month later, hosted on a short-lived 1/8 mi (0.20 km) track that was abandoned after the event.

The dirt surface throughout 1947 caused numerous surface issues, which led to various attempts at resurfacing the track with little success. Before the 1948 racing season, 99 Stadium was fully paved with banked turns, with the first paved races on the track being held on May 9. In 1948, the facility served as a temporary venue for the gridiron football team of St. Mary's High School after the school did not have a hosting venue for their 1948 season, playing their games in the track's infield. The first football game was held on September 26. After the 1951 racing season, the track's backstretch bleachers were demolished due to a lack of spectators using the bleachers. In 1954, Moore's 40% minority stake in the track was bought out by racing promoter Bob Barkhimer under his company Bob Barkhimer Associates (BBA). With Barkhimer's purchase, he began hosting NASCAR-sanctioned races under BBA. The track's walls, originally made out of lumber, were replaced with cement in 1957 and 1959, first replacing the walls on the track's turns and then the track's straights.

=== Hunefeld and Clapp years ===
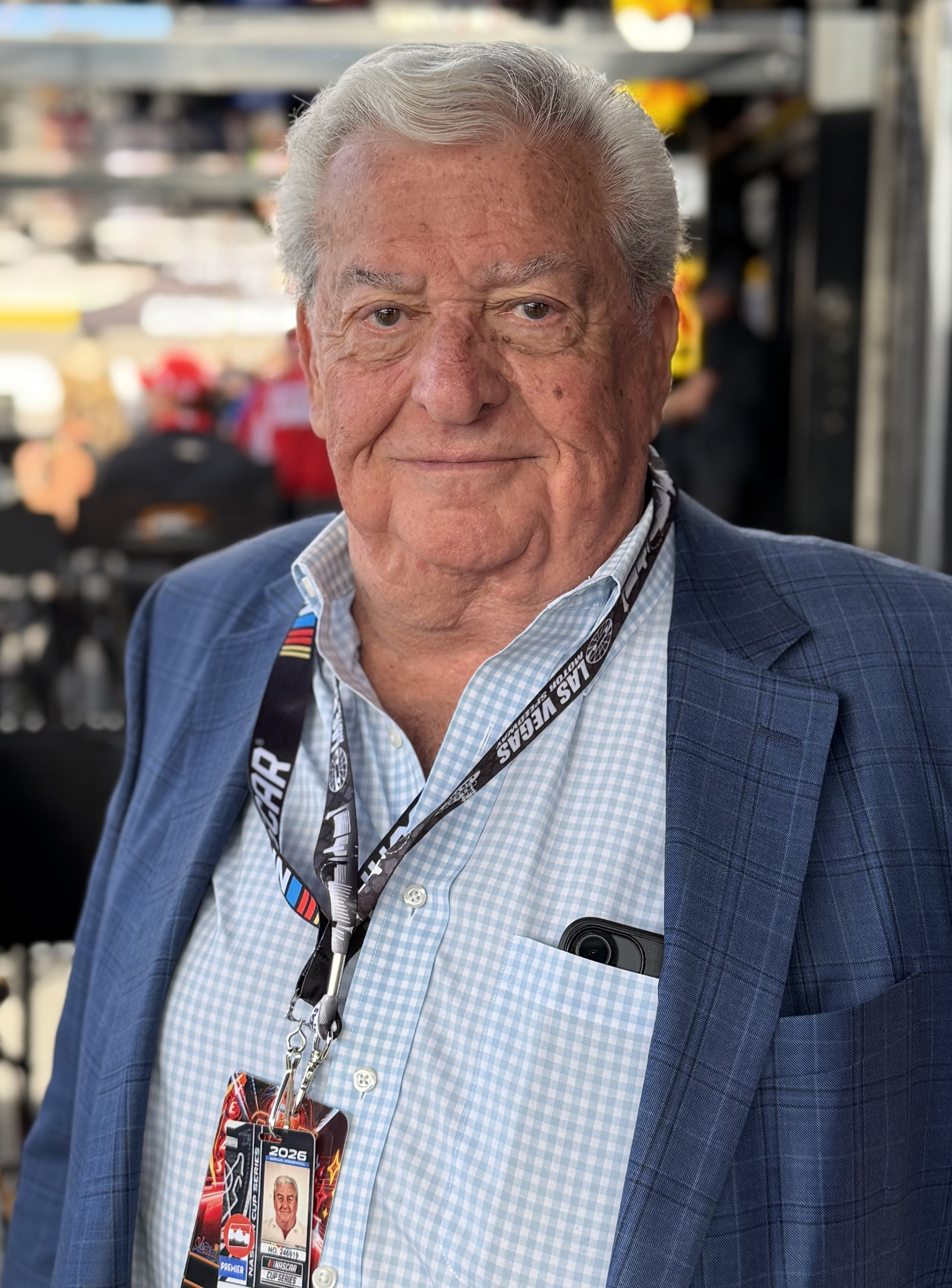
In 1977, motorsports businessman Ken Clapp (pictured in 2026) took over minority ownership of Stockton 99 Speedway.

In 1977, motorsports businessman Ken Clapp, as part of his purchase of BBA, took over Barkhimer's minority ownership of Stockton 99 Speedway. In 1984, the track surface of Stockton 99 Speedway was completely repaved in time for the beginning of the 1984 racing season; the first since the track's initial paving in 1948. That same year, the track oversaw its first major injury on June 30 when starter Ron Roach was hit by driver John Unger's car before the start of a heat race, causing several injuries to his legs, shoulder, and pelvis. Roach survived the incident. In 1987, a $300,000 renovation project focusing on new bleachers was completed. The following year, Clapp and racing driver Jack McCoy partnered and announced a proposal to build a new track on a former dairy farm in Ceres, nearby Modesto; at the time, the track was rumored to be a replacement of Stockton 99 Speedway, which Clapp denied publicly. The plans for the Ceres proposal eventually were scrapped after opposition from nearby dairy farmers and a mutual agreement between the farmers and the duo to keep the land for farming. The duo eventually sold the land to Chinese investors for $600,000.

In 1991, longtime track general manager Whitey Rich retired from his position after a 25-year stint, with Ken Gross, Clapp's son-in-law, taking over the position. On September 18, 1993, the track's first fatality occurred during a late model sportsman race after driver Ben Twisselman's car crashed and subsequently jumping over a pit area retaining wall, hitting a group of people and killing Rene Bourgois, a member of Mike David's pit crew. In February 1995, Gross was replaced by John Trussler as the track's general manager. Prior to the track's 2002 season, a "nearly $160,000" lighting system produced by Musco Lighting was installed at the track. Further improvements were made in 2004, which included the construction of a new sound system and a redesigned off-ramp from the track's pit area. On October 16, 2004, the track experienced its second fatality and its first driver fatality when 15-year-old John Dexter Moore died in a crash during a testing session at the track's first two turns, dying due to a brain stem laceration due to blunt force trauma; Moore was not wearing a HANS device during the time of the crash.

=== Failed redevelopment plans ===
By February 2005, The Record reported rumors of various parties being interested in purchasing the track for redevelopment, including a rumor that stated that developer Alex Spanos had already purchased the facility. Clapp denied rumors of the purchase, stating Clapp's contractual obligations lasted until 2006. However, six months later, Clapp and Bob Hunefeld stated that they were considering offers on the facility due to declining attendance. By the end of the year, Clapp stated that he was in process of selling Stockton 99 Speedway, with a projected final season in 2006. A deal to sell the track was finalized in January 2006 to Wilson Way Development, who planned to demolish the track to construct a housing development after a final 2006 season. The track's scheduled final event was held on September 16.

==== Tony Noceti era, reopening ====
By 2007, Wilson Way Development experienced severe financial troubles due to the subprime mortgage crisis, and after a down payment refund was refused by Clapp, the track was given back to Hunefeld and Clapp by 2008. In late August 2008, French Camp natives Tony and Carol Noceti announced that they were in negotiations to sign a five-year lease to operate Stockton 99 Speedway with majority owner Bob Hunefeld; the couple initially wanted to purchase the facility but could not formulate a deal with the owners of the track. By August 28, a five-year lease to operate the facility was signed by the couple and Hunefeld, with stated hopes of reopening the track in March 2009. To revitalize the facility, volunteers were hired to reinstall lighting and to clean and retouch the track. Stockton 99 Speedway reopened on March 22, 2009, with Tim Spurgeon winning the first feature event since the track's closure. Later in the year, the track was fully repaved by May; the first repave since 1997. On May 31, 2016, Bob Hunefeld passed away due to illness, with Bob's son, Chris, taking over the Hunefeld family's majority ownership of the track.

== Events ==
=== Motorsports events ===
Stockton 99 Speedway currently hosts the CARS Tour West. The track also hosts various local racing divisions, including late models, modifieds, pure stocks, mini stocks, legend cars, and Northern California Modified Association (NCMA)-sanctioned sprint car races. In addition, the track previously held the NASCAR-sanctioned regional touring ARCA Menards West Series and the now-defunct NASCAR Southwest Series.

=== Other events and uses ===
- Since 2021, Stockton 99 Speedway has held the annual San Joaquin Asparagus Festival, a food festival specializing in dishes with asparagus.

== See also ==
- West Series races at Stockton

== Book sources ==
- Clapp, Ken; Bourcier, Bones (2022). Sea to Shining Sea: Racing From the Wild West to Daytona (1st ed.). Newburyport, Massachusetts: Coastal 181. ISBN 978-1-73625-611-4.
- Shiels, Jim (1996). Stockton 99 Speedway: 50 Years And Still Turning Left (1st ed.).
