= Zaring =

Zaring is a surname. Notable people with the surname include:

- Bill Zaring (1917–2003), American racecar driver
- Grace Stone (née Zaring, 1891–1991), American novelist and short story writer
- Louise Zaring (1872–1970), American painter
