= American Racing Drivers Club =

The American Racing Drivers Club (ARDC) is an open-wheel midget car racing sanctioning body that operates primarily in the Mid-Atlantic area of the United States.

== History ==
The American Racing Drivers Club was organized in 1939, making it one of the oldest sanctioning bodies in the United States, predating NASCAR by nearly a decade. The purpose of the organization was to represent the drivers and car owners in dealing with track owners and promoters. The club's first president was Bill Schindler. and the first vice presidentfrom 1939 was tony bonadies till his death at Williams Grove pa in 1964. Ed "Dutch" Schaefer was elected president in 1952. Schaefer reigned until 1968, when the series featured 51 races and $93,000 in prize money.

== ARDC Midget Car Series ==
ARDC Midget Car Season Champions

- 1940 - Bill Schindler
- 1941 - Henry Banks
- 1945 - Bill Schindler
- 1946 - Bill Schindler
- 1947 - George Rice
- 1948 - Bill Schindler
- 1949 - Mike Nazaruk
- 1950 - Nick Fornoro Sr.
- 1951 - Fred Jiggs Peters
- 1952 - Steve McGrath
- 1953 - Mike Nazaruk
- 1954 - Vernon Land
- 1955 - Len Duncan
- 1956 - Ed "Dutch" Schaefer
- 1957 - Ed "Dutch" Schaefer
- 1958 - Len Duncan
- 1959 - Len Duncan
- 1960 - Ed "Dutch" Schaefer
- 1961 - Len Duncan
- 1962 - Len Duncan
- 1963 - Len Duncan
- 1964 - Len Duncan
- 1965 - Ed "Dutch" Schaefer
- 1966 - Joe Csiki
- 1967 - Len Duncan
- 1968 - Johnny Coy Sr.
- 1969 - Johnny Coy Sr.
- 1970 - Tom McAndrew
- 1971 - Johnny Coy Sr.
- 1972 - Johnny Coy Sr.
- 1973 - Leigh Earnshaw Jr.
- 1974 - Leigh Earnshaw Jr.
- 1975 - Leigh Earnshaw Jr.
- 1976 - Bob Cicconi
- 1977 - Lenny Boyd
- 1978 - George Ferguson Jr
- 1979 - Hank Rogers Jr.
- 1980 - Leigh Earnshaw Jr.
- 1981 - Hank Rogers Jr.
- 1982 - Nick Fornoro Jr.
- 1983 - Nick Fornoro Jr.
- 1984 - Nick Fornoro Jr.
- 1985 - Nick Fornoro Jr.
- 1986 - Nick Fornoro Jr.
- 1987 - Brett Mowrey
- 1988 - Billy Hughes
- 1989 - Billy Hughes
- 1990 - Billy Hughes
- 1991 - Lou Cicconi Jr
- 1992 - Joey Coy
- 1993 - Lou Cicconi Jr
- 1994 - Lou Cicconi Jr
- 1995 - Nick Fornoro Jr.
- 1996 - Phil DiMario
- 1997 - Ed Stimely Jr
- 1998 - Bryan Kobylarz
- 1999 - Bryan Kobylarz
- 2000 - Ray Bull
- 2001 - Ray Bull
- 2002 - Ray Bull
- 2003 - Ray Bull
- 2004 - Ray Bull
- 2005 - Ray Bull
- 2006 - Andy Martin
- 2007 - Andy Martin
- 2008 - Randy Monroe Jr.
- 2009 - Frank Polimeda
- 2010 - Steve Buckwalter
- 2011 - Drew Heistand
- 2012 - Tim Buckwalter
- 2013 - Trevor Kobylarz
- 2014 - Steven Drevicki
- 2015 - Steven Drevicki
- 2016 - Alex Bright
- 2017 - Ryan Greth

Reference (1940-2015):

== Other notable racers ==
- Mario Andretti, 1961 to mid-1962
- Ray Brown
- Jan Opperman
- Johnny Thomson

== The Cars ==
Registered midget Chassis in ARDC range from Elite, Spike, Stealth, Bullet, Hawk, F5, Bishop, and Beast. The engines range from Chevy, Ford, Volkswagen, Pontiac, and Mopar, with big-name motor builders such as Alan Johnson, Ed Pink, Gaerte, Brayton, Hawk, Fontana, and Don Ott. With one competitive Personal Motor Builder, Mark Piazza. Today, all the motors are 4 cylinders, but have approximately 350 to 400 horsepower (300 kW), while weighing only 900 pounds.

== See also ==
- National Midget Auto Racing Hall of Fame
