= Bobby Meeks =

American hot rod mechanic

Robert E. Meeks (July 17, 1921 – August 8, 2006) was an American hot rod engine builder and chief mechanic to famed hot rod driver and auto parts designer Vic Edelbrock. Meeks was pioneer in the early days of hot-rodding and was considered the first Ford flathead guru.

Meeks was born in St. Louis, Missouri. When he was just 15 years old, Vic Edelbrock found Meeks hanging around his repair garage and offered him a job, asking "wanna get your hands dirty?" Meeks became Edelbrock's first employee and never worked for anyone else. Meeks was like a brother to Vic and was next to him the day his only son was born, Vic Edelbrock, Jr.

In 1942, Meeks joined the U.S. Navy and served four years as a Gunner's Mate in World War II.

In 1955, a friend of Meeks who worked at General Motors, came to him at Edelbrock and presented him with the opportunity to work on the new Chevy V8. Edelbrock was given 3 of the brand new engines before the public ever saw them and Meeks was in charge of testing.

While working with Edelbrock, Meeks headed up his racing team and also worked on notable record-breakers such as the Pierson Brothers coupe and Alex Xydias with his So-cal streamliner in 1949. The latter was the first American car to break to 200 mph barrier at the Bonneville Salt Flats.

Meeks was known to have built custom engines for both bootleggers and the very same IRS agents attempting to catch them.

Meeks was also one of the first mechanics to experiment with high-octane fuels. He worked with nitromethane and spent considerable effort disguising it so competitors wouldn't know what his giving him the speed increase.

Meeks retired in 1993 after working with Edelbrock for almost 65 years.

Meeks died in 2006 at the age of 85.
