= Perry Grimm =

American racing driver

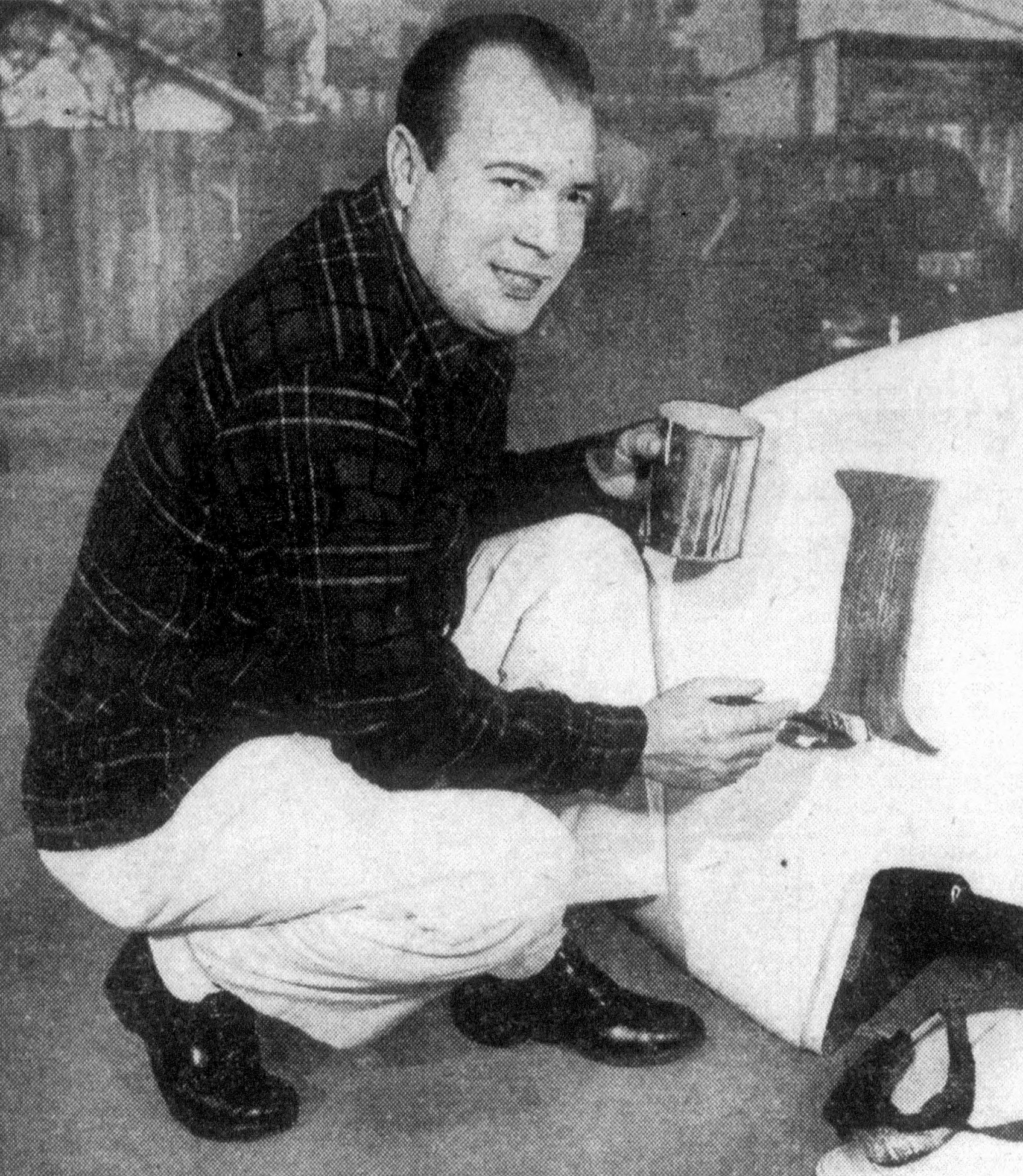
Grimm, circa 1949

Perry Grimm (February 19, 1914 – September 11, 1971) was an American racecar driver who raced midget cars in California and Australia.

== Midget car ==
Grimm drove midget cars for the Edelbrock dirt track racing team. He raced on the West Coast of the United States in the URA(United Midget Racing Association), and won the 1946 and 1949 Turkey Night Grand Prix at Gilmore Stadium, and place second and third in two others. Also, in 1949, he won the Pacific Coast Midget title, as well. After a few years of driving and several major crashes, racing in the Southern California circuit had begun to take a toll on him. He recommended to Vic Edelbrock that he replace him with a young driver named Rodger Ward. Ward took over for Grimm late in the 1949 season and went on to a glorious career, including two wins of the Indianapolis 500.

== Australian midget car racing ==
Grimm is credited with transforming the scene of Australian midget car racing when his appearance with fellow racer Cal Niday forced the 1946 update to American standards. The performance of these two completely outstripped the competition when they arrived with their Kurtis-Kraft V8-60 cars. However, it was Grimm who is credited most and considered the patron of midget car racing in Australia. He allowed fame racer Stud Beasley to copy every aspect of his car and even arranged the delivery of the engines and Edelbrock components. Beasley then went on to dominate the local scene and lap the entire field in its first major feature race, the World Derby on December 6, 1941.

== Other events ==
Grimm's third-place finish at New York's Roosevelt Raceway open competition show in 1939 is still talked about as he drove the last 55 miles of the 150-miler with a flat tire. That race was watched by a crowd of 61,256.

Grimm passed his drivers test for the Indianapolis 500 Mile Race in 1952 but never earned a spot in the starting field.

Grimm died of a heart attack in Los Angeles at the age of 57.

Grimm was inducted in the National Midget Auto Racing Hall of Fame in 2005.
