= Mike Streicher =

American racing driver (1957–2019)

Mike Streicher (January 9, 1957 – November 6, 2019) was an American auto racing driver from Findlay, Ohio. He was the United States Automobile Club National Midget Champion of 1991 when he fielded the Streicher #8. Together with Bobby Seymour and Seymour Enterprises of Marlboro, Massachusetts, he built the first and later manufactured the Hawk brand Midget and Quarter Midget cars. He was also a teacher at University of Northwestern Ohio in their High Performance program. In 2018, Streicher was inducted into the National Midget Auto Racing Hall of Fame.
