= Turkey Night Grand Prix =

Annual race of midget cars

United States Auto Club National Midget Series
- Venue: Ventura Raceway (as of 2016)
- Corporate sponsor: Automotive Racing Products
- First race: 1934
- Distance: 19.6 miles
- Laps: 98

Circuit information
- Surface: clay
- Length: .320 km (0.199 mi)

The Automotive Racing Products Turkey Night Grand Prix is an annual race of midget cars. It is the third oldest race in the United States behind the Indianapolis 500 and the Pikes Peak International Hill Climb. It has been held on Thanksgiving night most years since 1934, where it was founded by Earl Gilmore at his Gilmore Stadium in Los Angeles. It stayed at this location until 1950. Since that time it has been held at various southern California race tracks. Since 1955, the race has been promoted by J. C. Agajanian and later his descendants, currently by son Cary. Traditionally a dirt track event, it has sometimes been on asphalt during the turn of the 21st century, although it returned to dirt in 2012. The feature race was held over 98 laps in the modern era, the same number that Agajanian used for his racecars.

The race is the traditional end of the midget and sprint car racing season in North America, although many top stars typically take a few weeks off before returning to racing in Australia or New Zealand, with the Southern Hemisphere summer leading to an "international season" that starts Boxing Day.

There was no race in 1942–44 (World War II) nor 2020 (California state pandemic restrictions).

The expansion of the USAC Midget schedule around Thanksgiving week with the Hangtown 100 in Placerville the week before, and the Merced County Fairgrounds meeting on the Tuesday and Wednesday of Thanksgiving week led promoters in 2021 to move the Turkey Night Grand Prix to a two-day format away from Thanksgiving, with practice and support division races on Friday, and the heat races and feature on Saturday. Currently, the California Midget Swing is 16 days in the two weeks leading to Thanksgiving and the two days after with six features -- Placerville Speedway's two-night feature on the first weekend, followed by three races the week before Thanksgiving at Plaza Park in Visalia on Tuesday, Merced on Friday and Tulare on Saturday, followed by Thanksgiving Week's Jason Leffler Memorial at Kern Raceway on Tuesday that leads to Friday's opening of the two-night Turkey Night event. This is similar to the summer "Indiana Sprint Week" for USAC's non-winged sprint cars.

The Turkey Night is regarded as one of three major midget races during the year, with the Chili Bowl in Tulsa, OK, and the Bryan Clauson Classic at the Indianapolis Motor Speedway.

== Drivers ==
The event is considered a major event in the midget cars series. It frequently attracts drivers from other disciplines, especially former drivers that have moved to the highest levels of auto racing; the major auto racing circuits in the United States end their seasons prior to Thanksgiving, so major drivers do not have any schedule conflicts with their main circuits. Drivers that have competed in the event include Parnelli Jones, A. J. Foyt, Johnnie Parsons, Bill Vukovich, Danny Oakes, Jeff Gordon, Tony Stewart, J. J. Yeley, Jason Leffler, Kasey Kahne, and Kyle Larson.

After Kaylee Bryson qualified fastest for the 2021 event, she became the first woman to start on the pole position in the 80th event. Her Keith Kunz/Curb-Agajanian teammate Taylor Reimer qualified second, and they became the first women to start first and second in USAC National Midget history. Bryson led the first 17 laps to become the first woman to lead the event.

== Locations ==
Several locations have hosted the race.

- Gilmore Stadium (1934–1950) (now Television City Studios)
- Gardena Stadium (1955–1959)
- Ascot Park (1960–1974, 1976–1990)
- Speedway 605 (1975)
- Saugus Speedway (1991)
- Bakersfield Speedway (1992–1995, 1998)
- Perris Auto Speedway (1996, 2012–2015)
- Ventura Raceway (1997, 2016–present)
- Irwindale Speedway (1999–2011)

== List of winners ==
Season	Driver
1934	Bob Swanson
1935	Ted Sizemore
1936	Ronney Householder
1937	Ronney Householder
1938	Bob Swanson
1939	Mel Hansen
1940	Roy Russing
1941	Roy Russing
1945	Danny Oakes
1946	Perry Grimm
1947	Johnny McDowell
1948	Bill Vukovich
1949	Perry Grimm
1950	Bill Zaring
1955	Johnnie Parsons
1956	Edgar Elder
1957	George Amick
1958	Joe Garson
1959	Tony Bettenhausen
1960	A. J. Foyt
1961	A. J. Foyt
1962	Bill Cantrell
1963	Mel Kenyon
1964	Parnelli Jones
1965	Dick Atkins
1966	Parnelli Jones
1967	Gary Bettenhausen
1968	Sam Sessions
1969	George Benson
1970	Gary Bettenhausen
1971	Billy Engelhart
1972	Tony Simon
1973	Billy Engelhart
1974	Danny McKnight
1975	Mel Kenyon
1976	Bubby Jones
1977	Gary Patterson
1978	Rick Goudy
1979	Ron Shuman
1980	Ron Shuman
1981	Ron Shuman
1982	Ron Shuman
1983	Kevin Olson
1984	Ron Shuman
1985	Brent Kaeding
1986	Warren Mockler
1987	Ron Shuman
1988	Chuck Gurney
1989	Chuck Gurney
1990	Stan Fox
1991	Stan Fox
1992	Ron Shuman
1993	Ron Shuman
1994	Jordan Hermansader
1995	Billy Boat
1996	Billy Boat
1997	Billy Boat
1998	Jay Drake
1999	Jason Leffler
2000	Tony Stewart
2001	Dave Steele
2002	Michael Lewis
2003	Dave Steele
2004	Bobby East
2005	Jason Leffler
2006	Billy Wease
2007	Dave Darland
2008	Bobby Santos III
2009	Bryan Clauson
2010	Bryan Clauson
2011	Caleb Armstrong
2012	Kyle Larson
2013	Dave Darland
2014	Christopher Bell
2015	Tanner Thorson
2016	Kyle Larson
2017	Christopher Bell
2018	Christopher Bell
2019	Kyle Larson
2021	Logan Seavey
2022	Justin Grant
2023	Kyle Larson
2024	Corey Day
2025	Corey Day
