= George Rice (racing driver) =

George J. Viola (February 22, 1914 – February 26, 2003), better known by his racing name George Rice, was a midget race car driver from Milford, Connecticut.

== Personal life ==
George fathered two daughters, Sarah and Glorianna, and a son, Edward, with his wife Bess.

== Racing career ==
Rice was born George J. Viola. When he started racing, he drove sprint cars, not midgets. When he heard about midgets, he wanted to try them but his sprint car club at that time don't permit drivers to compete in other series. Viola took the last name of his friend Charlie Rice to become "George Rice". When his younger brother, John, decided to race midgets also, he took the name Johnny Rice and the pair became known as the "Rice Brothers".

In the 1940s in particular, Rice was very successful. In 1947 alone, he won the Midget track championship at Danbury (CT) Fair Racearena, Deer Park (NY) Speedway, and won his second consecutive title at West Haven (CT) Speedway. He was the 1947 ARDC Midget champion. In 1948, he won the Bridgeport (CT) Speedway Midget track championship.

Rice also raced in 24 Hours of Le Mans with the Briggs Cunningham team in 1952.

=== Awards ===
Rice was named to the National Midget Auto Racing Hall of Fame in 2009.
