= Dutch Schaefer (racing driver) =

American racing driver (1915–1978)

Ed "Dutch" Schaefer (June 23, 1915 – March 12, 1978) was an American racecar driver.

Schaefer was 1940 champion at the track at Cedarhurst, New York. He won the 1946 and 1948 track championships at Philadelphia’s Yellow Jacket Speedway. He was a four-time American Racing Drivers Club (ARDC) midget car champion (1956, 1957, 1960, and 1965). He served as President of the East Coast regional racing organization from 1952 to 1968. Schaefer once won a USAC national midget event at Hershey, Pennsylvania by lapping the entire field. He later became the President of the Super Midget Racing Club, and won the series' title in 1973. He died in 1978.

== Career awards ==
Schaefer was elected to the National Midget Auto Racing Hall of Fame in 1999.
