= Ray Brown (racing driver) =

American racing driver (born 1923)

- Born: Raymond Lyman Brown; October 13, 1923 Dobbs Ferry, New York
- Died: August 19, 1989 (aged 65)
- Retired: 1967
- Debut season: 1949

Midget car racing
- Years active: 1960-1967
- Wins: 27+

Previous series
- 1949-1959 Wins Championships: Modified racing 58+ 5

Raymond Brown (October 13, 1923 – August 19, 1989) was a pioneering driver of Dirt Modified stock cars and later a standout open-cockpit Midget racer. From 1951 to 1959, Brown recorded 43 victories at the Orange County Fair Speedway in Middletown, New York, and claimed three track championships.

== Racing career ==
Following his service in World War II, Brown started out racing stock cars — junkyard-refugee jalopies. He successfully competed in New York at Arlington, Empire Raceway in Menands, Freeport Stadium, Peekskill Stadium, Pine Bowl Speedway in Snyders Corners, and Rhinebeck; as well as Candlelight Stadium in Bridgeport, Connecticut; Nazareth Speedway, Pennsylvania; and Morristown Raceway in New Jersey. Brown won the inaugural race at Old Bridge Stadium, New Jersey, in 1953 and was crowned the first track champion. He was also the 1950 champion at Riverside Park Speedway, Massachusetts.

Following the 1959 season, Brown sold off everything to sign on as a Midget racer with the American Racing Drivers Club, winning 7 of his first 9 at Williams Grove Speedway, Pennsylvania, as well as events at Old Bridge Stadium, Reading Fairgrounds Speedway in Pennsylvania, and Victory/Orange County Fair Speedway. He won 27 Midget features from 1960 to 1967, retiring after he was involved in a motorcycle accident that seriously injured one of his legs.

Brown was inducted into the Eastern Motorsports Press Association and the Northeast Dirt Modified Halls of Fame.
