= National Midget Auto Racing Hall of Fame =

Auto racing museum honoring former race drivers

Coordinates: 43°10′40″N 89°12′40″W

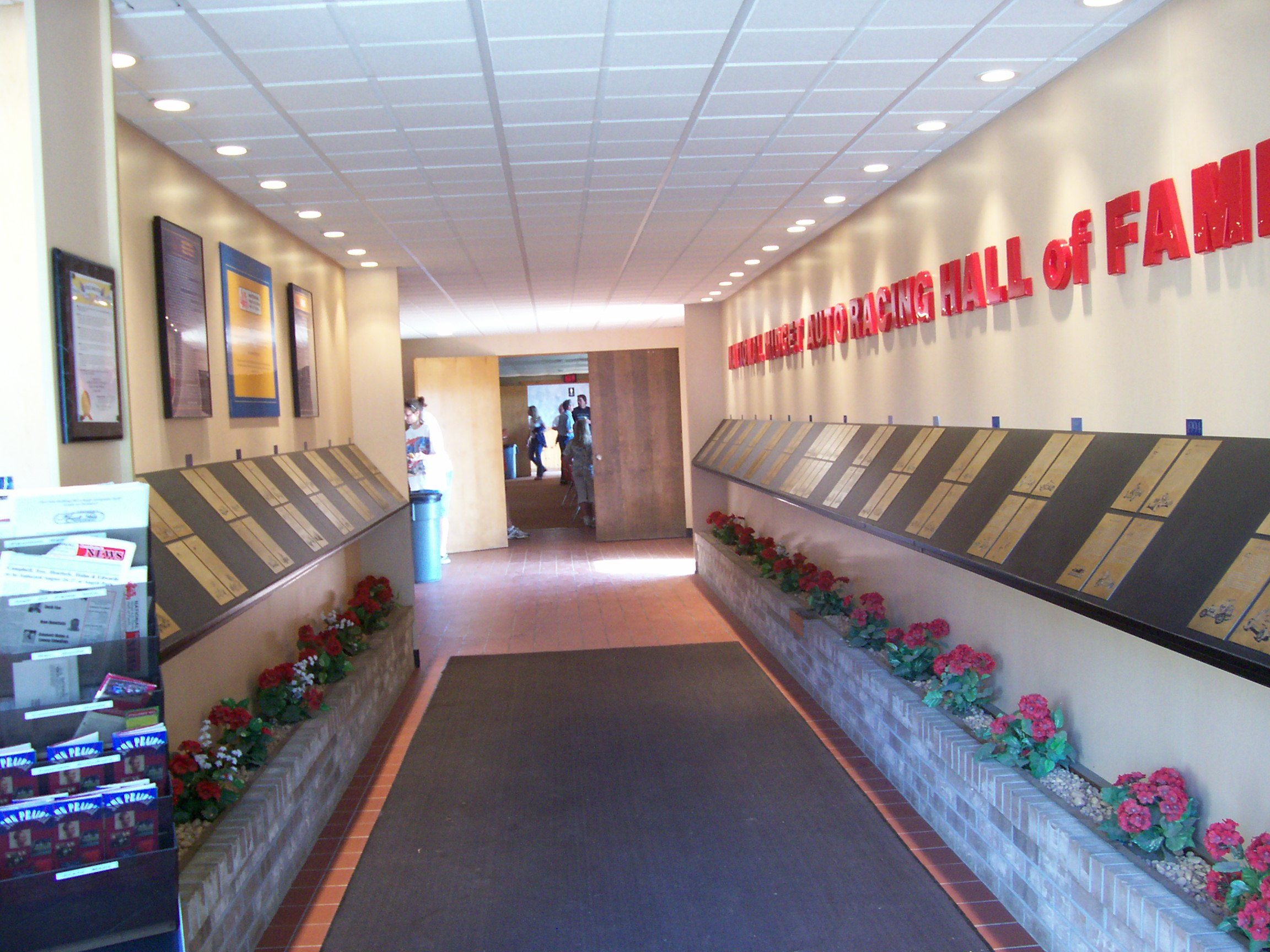

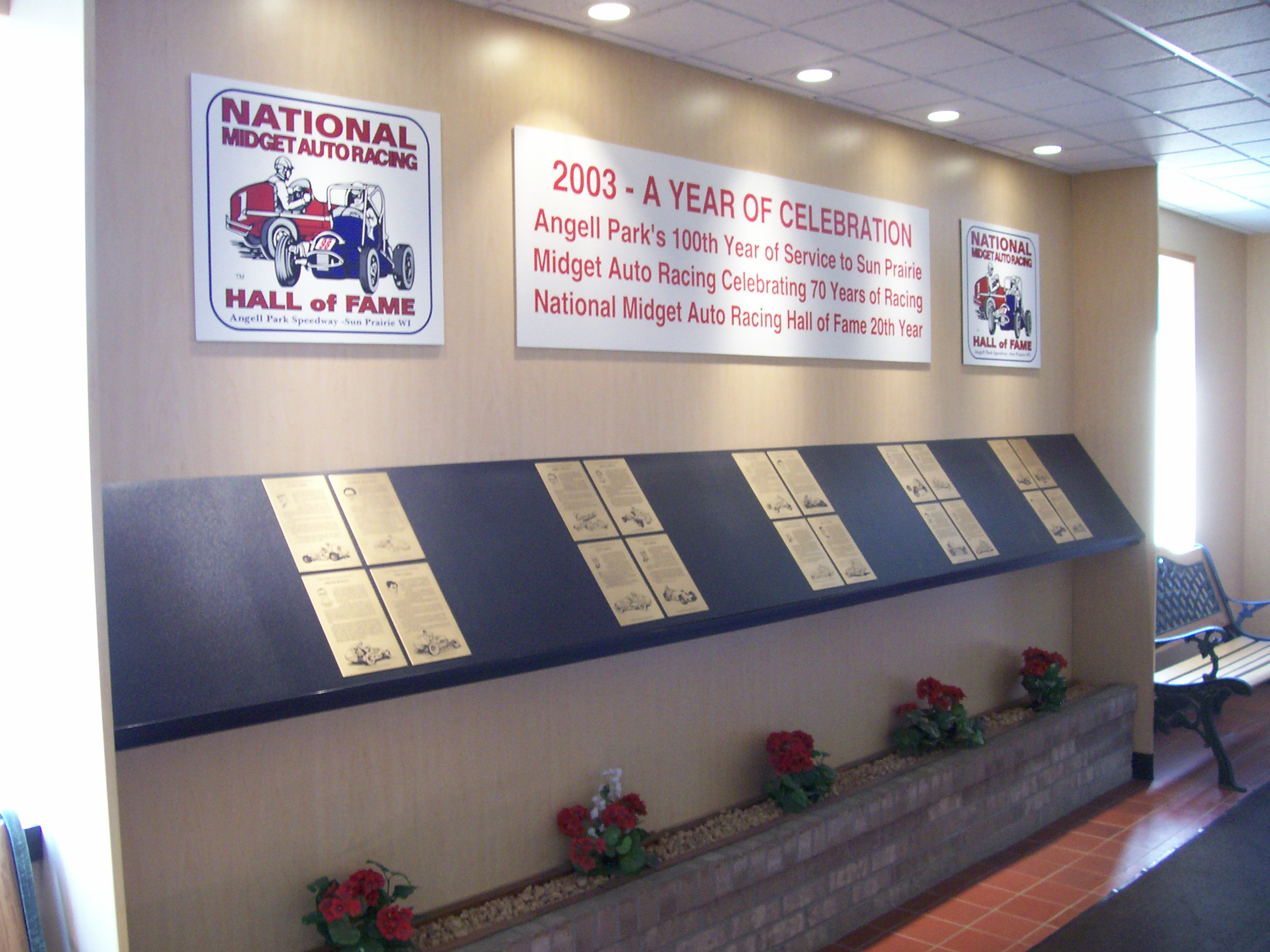
A wing of the Hall of Fame

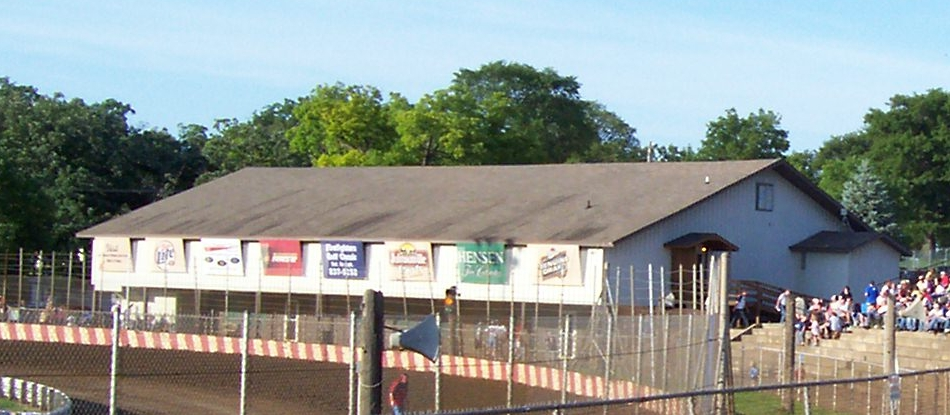
The National Midget Auto Racing Hall of Fame

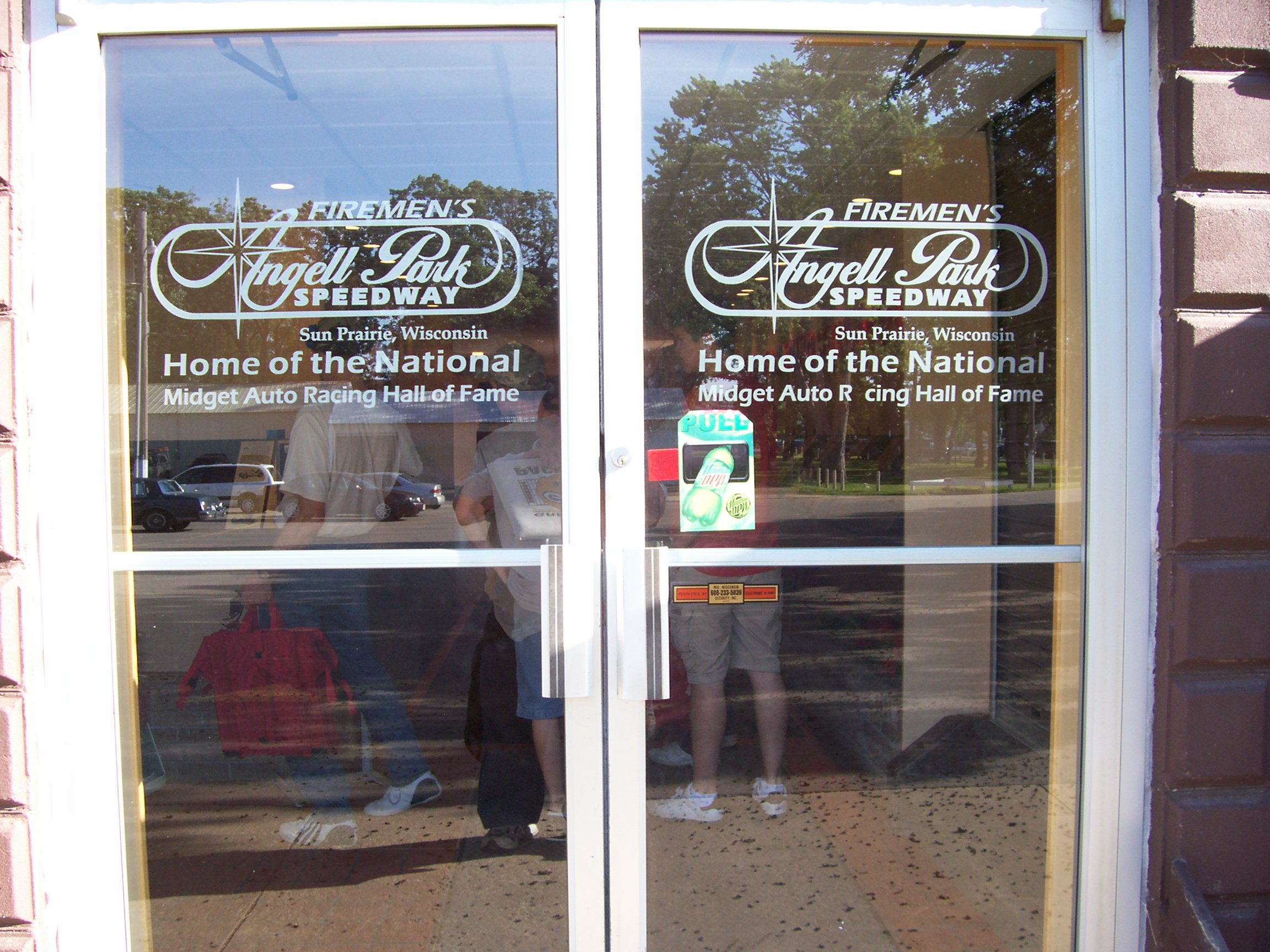
Entrance

The National Midget Auto Racing Hall of Fame is an American Hall of Fame and museum for midget cars. The Hall of Fame is located at Angell Park Speedway in Sun Prairie, Wisconsin, and can be accessed during weekly Sunday races during the summer. Inductees are often honored with their award in January at the Chili Bowl at Tulsa.

== List of inductees ==
There were 272 inductees after the 2024 induction ceremony.

- Wayne Adams
- Fred Agabashian
- J.C. Agajanian
- Floyd Alvis
- George Amick
- Emil Andres
- Mario Andretti
- Boots Archer
- Chuck Arnold
- Tommy Astone
- Dick Atkins
- Lloyd Axel
- Carl Badami
- Johnny Balch
- Johnny Baldwin
- Bobby Ball
- Henry Banks
- Bob Barker
- Bob Barkhimer
- Emmett "Buzz" Barton
- George Benson
- Gary Bettenhausen
- Tony Bettenhausen
- Billy Betteridge
- J. Gordon Betz
- Tom Bigelow
- George Bignotti
- George Binnie
- Billy Boat
- Tony Bonadies
- Al Bonnell
- Dan Boorse
- Roy Bowe
- Johnny Boyd
- Don Branson
- Ken Brenn, Sr.
- Ken Brenneman
- Jimmy Bryan
- Frank Burany
- Marvin Burke
- Hank Butcher
- Vito Calia
- Don Cameron
- Foster Campbell
- Steve Cannon
- Willard Cantrell
- Duane Carter
- Neal Carter
- Pancho Carter
- Mike Caruso
- Danny Caruthers
- Doug Caruthers
- Jimmy Caruthers
- Ernie Casale
- Bill Chennault
- Sim Clark
- Bryan Clauson
- Gordon Cleveland
- Harry Conklin
- Tommy Copp
- Johnny Coy
- Art Cross
- Charlie Curryer
- Jimmy Davies
- Dominic Distarce
- Pedro "PeeWee" Distarce
- Kevin Doty
- Jay Drake
- Pop Dreyer
- Len Duncan
- Teddy Duncan
- Leigh Earnshaw
- Bob East
- Bobby East
- Rex Easton
- Chris Economaki
- Vic Edelbrock
- Don Edmunds
- Lanny Edwards
- Edgar Elder
- Billy Eldridge
- Ray Elliott
- Bill Engelhart
- Walt Faulkner
- Robby Flock
- Myron Fohr
- Burt Foland
- Carl Forberg
- Drew Fornoro
- Nick Fornoro Sr.
- Nick Fornoro Jr.
- Jack Fox
- Stan Fox
- A. J. Foyt
- Danny Frye
- Billy Garrett
- Joe Garson
- Gene Gennetten
- Fred Gerhardt
- Ernie Gesell
- Joe Giba
- Earl Gilmore
- Norm Girtz
- Jeff Gordon
- Andy Granatelli
- Cecil Green
- Bob Gregg
- Mike Gregg
- Perry Grimm
- Chuck Gurney
- Eddie Haddad
- Emmett Hahn
- Ted Halibrand
- Sam Hanks
- Mel Hansen
- Gene Hartley
- Ted Hartley
- Allen Heath
- Mack Hellings
- Barbara Hellyer
- Jim Hettinger
- Ken Hickey
- Bob Higman
- Bill Hill
- Tracy Hines
- Ron Hoettels
- Bill Holmes
- Bill Homeier
- Roscoe "Pappy" Hough
- Ronney Householder
- Larry Howard
- Dave Humphrey
- Tommy Hunt
- Kenny Irwin Jr.
- Eddie Jackson
- Page Jones
- Parnelli Jones
- Dick Jordan
- Justice Brothers
- Win Kelley
- Don Kenyon
- Mel Kenyon
- Les Kimbrell
- Danny Kladis
- Arnold Knepper
- Junior Knepper
- Ray Knepper
- Steve Knepper
- Earl Kouba
- Paul Krueger
- Frank Kurtis
- Jimmy LaManna
- Jud Larson
- Jason Leffler
- Roy Leslie
- Steve Lewis
- Gib Lilly
- Einar T. "Swede" Lindskog
- Howard Linne
- Jack London
- Steve Lotshaw
- Johnny Mann
- Johnny Mantz
- Carl Marchese
- Chuck Marshall
- Bobby Marshman
- Mack McClellan
- Johnny McDowell
- Mike McGreevy
- Harry McQuinn
- Don Meacham
- Freddie Meeker
- Eddie Meyer
- Roy Morrison
- Jack "Curley" Mills
- Johnny Moorhouse
- Earl Motter
- Duke Nalon
- Mike Nazaruk
- Ray Nichels
- Ken Nichols
- Ed Normi
- Bob Nowicke
- Mike O'Halloran
- Cletus "Cowboy" O'Rourke
- Danny Oakes
- Fred Offenhauser
- Kevin Olson
- Alex Pabst
- Bob Pankratz
- Wally Pankratz
- Johnnie Parsons
- Johnny Parsons
- Gene Pastor
- Johnny Pawl
- Fred "Jiggs" Peters
- Jerry Piper
- Ralph Pratt
- Dave Randolph
- Norm Rapp
- Stevie Reeves
- George Rice
- Larry Rice
- Ray Richards
- Roy Richter
- Jim Rieder
- Dick Ritchie
- Johnny Ritter
- Randy Roberts
- Chuck Rodee
- Lloyd Ruby
- Roy Russing
- Paul Russo
- Troy Ruttman
- Lowell Sachs
- Jimmy Sams
- Wes Saegesser
- Ed "Dutch" Schaefer
- Bill Schindler
- Ken Schrader
- Gordon Schroeder
- Les Scott
- Joe Shaheen
- Bob Shannon
- Gene Shannon
- Art Shanoian
- Roy Sherman
- Ron Shuman
- Jigger Sirois
- Bob Slater
- Jimmy Snyder
- Joe Sostilio
- Chuck Stevenson
- Tony Stewart
- Mike Streicher
- Dave Strickland
- Bob Stroud
- Len Sutton
- Bob Swanson
- Paul Swedburg
- Ted Tappett (Phil Walters)
- Bob Tattersall
- Shorty Templeman
- Johnny Thomson
- Johnnie Tolan
- Sleepy Tripp
- Harry Turner
- Jack Turner
- Bobby Unser
- Bill Vandewater
- Rich Vogler
- Bill Vukovich
- Bill Vukovich II
- Dick Wallen
- Rodger Ward
- Leroy Warriner
- Ed Watson
- Bob Wente
- Chuck Weyant
- Jim Whitman
- Bob Wilke
- Greg Wilke
- Tony Willman
- Billy Wood
- Ashley Wright
- Ernest "Crocky" Wright
- Karl Young
- Gordy Youngstrom
- Wally Zale
- Bill Zaring
- George Zarounian
