= Bill Schindler =

American racing driver (1909–1952)

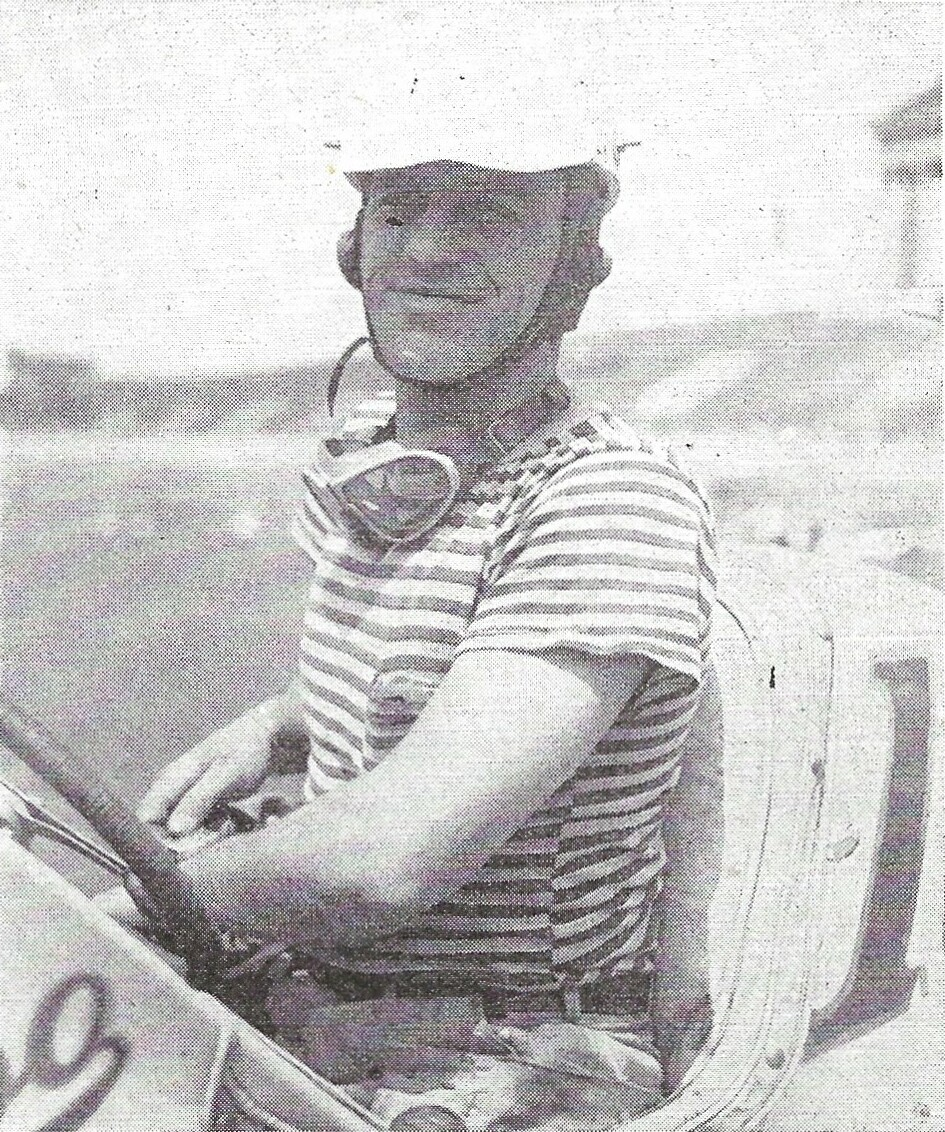
- Bill Schindler at Soldier Field (circa 1946)
- Born: William Lawrence Schindler; March 6, 1909 Middletown, New York, U.S.
- Died: September 20, 1952 (aged 43) Allentown, Pennsylvania, U.S.

Champ Car career
- 29 races run over 5 years
- Best finish: 10th (1950)
- First race: 1935 Langhorne 100 (Langhorne)
- Last race: 1952 Syracuse 100 (Syracuse)
- First win: 1952 Springfield 100 (Springfield)
Wins	Podiums	Poles
1	8	2

Formula One World Championship career
- Active years: 1950–1952
- Team(s): Snowberger, Kurtis Kraft, Stevens
- Entries: 3
- Championships: 0
- Wins: 0
- Podiums: 0
- Career points: 0
- Pole positions: 0
- Fastest laps: 0
- First entry: 1950 Indianapolis 500
- Last entry: 1952 Indianapolis 500

William Lawrence Schindler (March 6, 1909 – September 20, 1952) was an American racing driver.

== Racing career ==
Schindler began racing in 1931 in a sprint car. He was racing midget cars on the East Coast of the United States at their introduction in 1934. Schindler lost his left leg from above the knee while racing in a Champ car race in 1936 at Mineola, Long Island. He is one of three drivers to have participated in the Indianapolis 500 with a prosthetic leg, along with Al Miller and Cal Niday.

Schindler was part of a group determined to keep the AAA out of the East Coast in 1937. He was elected president of the "outlaw" group. Schindler briefly switched to the AAA in 1940, and won the Bronx Coliseum Indoor championship. He returned to his "outlaw" past when he was named the president of the newly formed American Racing Drivers Club (ARDC). He served as president for the club's first six years. Schindler won ARDC championships in 1940, 1945, 1946 and 1948. In both 1947 and 1948 he won 53 midget car feature races, which helped bring popularity to midget car racing in the Northeastern United States.

Schindler rejoined the AAA so he could race in the Indianapolis 500 in 1950, 1951, and 1952.

=== World Drivers' Championship career ===
The AAA/USAC-sanctioned Indianapolis 500 was included in the FIA World Drivers' Championship from 1950 through 1960. Drivers competing at Indianapolis during those years were credited with World Drivers' Championship participation, and were eligible to score WDC points alongside those which they may have scored towards the AAA/USAC National Championship.

Schindler participated in three World Drivers' Championship races at Indianapolis. His best finish was 13th place, and he scored no World Drivers' Championship points.

== Death ==
Schindler died in a sprint car racing crash in Allentown, Pennsylvania, in 1952. Schindler was leading the race on the third lap when a car driven by Paul Becker lost a wheel and skidded into the fence. He did not see the "go slow" sign that was immediately waved after Becker's crash and his black Offenhauser hit the wheel, crashed through the fence and tumbled down a 20-foot embankment. He was killed instantly.

== Awards and honors ==
- He was inducted in the National Sprint Car Hall of Fame in 1998.
- He was inducted in the National Midget Auto Racing Hall of Fame in 1985.
- He was inducted in the New England Auto Racers Hall of Fame in 2004.

== Motorsports career results ==
=== AAA Championship Car results ===
Year	1	2	3	4	5	6	7	8	9	10	11	12	13	14	15	Pos	Points
1950	INDY; 26	MIL; 18	LAN; 16	SPR; 12	MIL; 22	PIK	SYR; DNS	DET; 15	SPR; 15	SAC; 2	PHX; DNQ	BAY; 3	DAR; 2			10th	690
1951	INDY; 13	MIL; 16	LAN; 2	DAR; 21	SPR; 3	MIL; 4	DUQ; 12	DUQ	PIK	SYR; 8	DET	DNC; DNP	SJS	PHX; 8	BAY; 9	11th	693.5
1952	INDY; 14	MIL; 3	RAL; 23	SPR; 1	MIL; 2	DET; 13	DUQ; 14	PIK	SYR; 16	DNC	SJS	PHX				11th	660

=== Indianapolis 500 results ===
Year	Car	Start	Qual	Rank	Finish	Laps	Led	Retired
1950	67	22	132.690	4	26	111	0	Universal joint
1951	10	16	134.033	11	13	129	0	Rod
1952	7	15	134.988	20	14	200	0	Running
Totals						440	0	

Starts	3
Poles	0
Front Row	0
Wins	0
Top 5	0
Top 10	0
Retired	2
