= Lunati =

Lunati is an Italian surname. Notable people with the surname include:

- Bernardino Lunati (1452–1497), Italian Roman Catholic cardinal
- Carlo Ambrogio Lonati also Lunati (c. 1645 – c. 1712), Italian composer, violinist and singer
- Frank Lunati, battalion surgeon in the 1st Cavalry Division (United States) in Vietnam
- Giuseppe Lunati, 19th-century Italian politician, see List of mayors of Rome
- Joe Lunati, American drag racer and businessman
- Matteo Lunati (born 1987), Italian footballer
- Pablo Lunati (born 1967), Argentine football referee
- Thierry Lunati, co-founder of professional social network Viadeo

Fictional characters:

- Dr Lunati, a character in the 1950 film Captain Carey, U.S.A.

== See also ==
- Lunati, U. S. manufacturer of automotive engine parts, subsidiary of Holley Performance Products
