= Ken Clapp =

American racing promoter (born 1939)

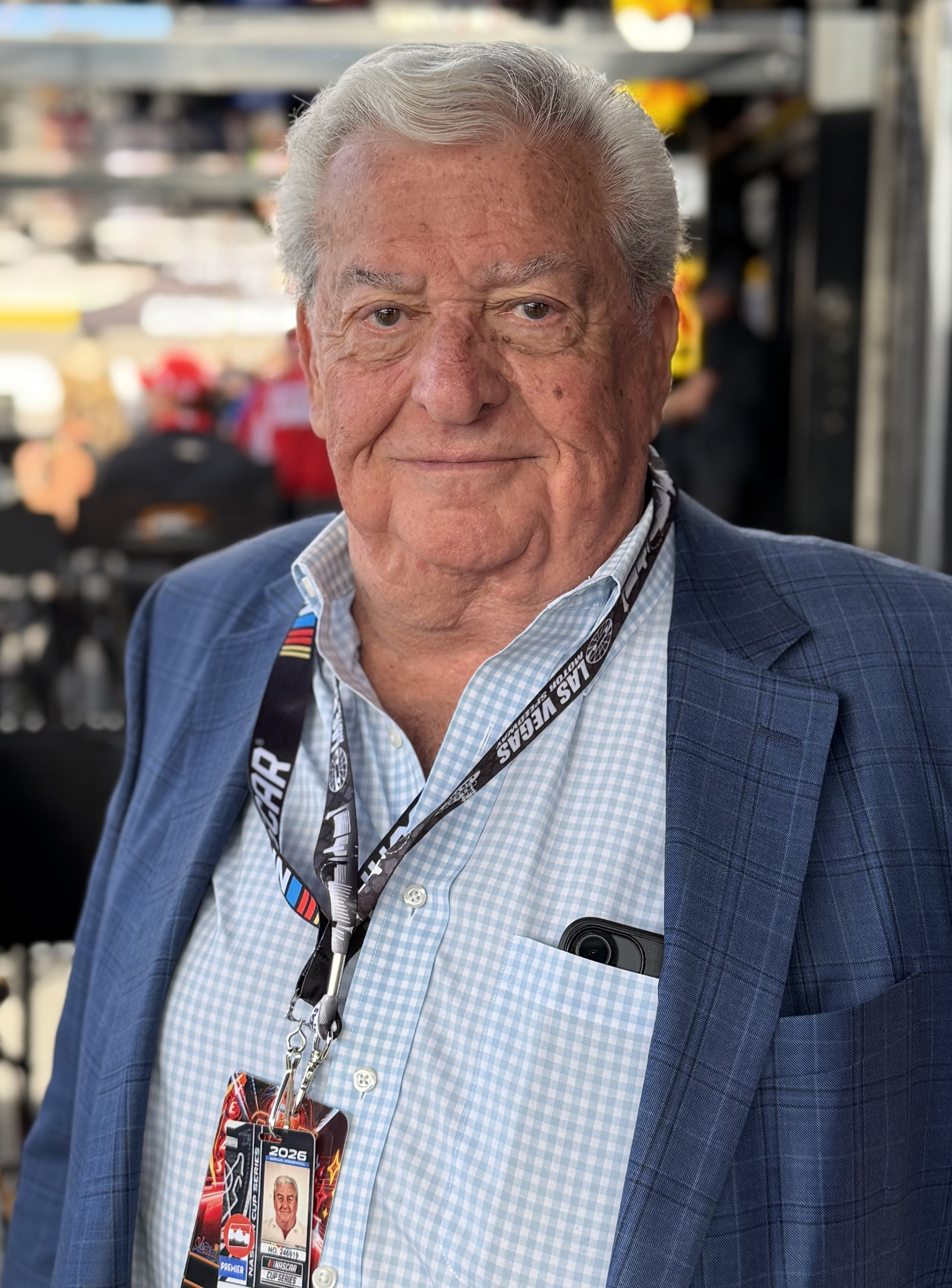
- Clapp in 2026
- Born: Charles Kendall Clapp; April 25, 1939 (age 87); Oakland, California, U.S.
- Education: Diablo Valley College
- Occupations: Motorsports executive, businessman, entrepreneur
- Years active: 1966–present
- Employer(s): NASCAR; West Coast Stock Car/Motorsports Hall of Fame
- Spouse(s): Peggy Jean Baradat (m. 1959; div. 1970) Jacqueline Merle Osborn (m. 1973; died 1995) Delores Rhea Gravett (m. 1998; died 2024)

Charles Kendall Clapp (born April 25, 1939) is an American businessman, motorsports executive and entrepreneur. He is best known as the co-founder of the NASCAR Truck Series, chairman of the West Coast Stock Car/Motorsports Hall of Fame, and as a driving force in NASCAR's expansion on the West Coast. He is also an executive at numerous companies, holding various positions.

Clapp was born and raised in the San Francisco Bay Area. After being introduced to the motorsports industry by racing promoters Margo Burke and Bob Barkhimer alongside car owner Cos Cancilla, Clapp began his motorsports career in the 1960s, promoting local racing events in California. After working various jobs in the early half of the 1970s, he was prospected by Burke and NASCAR executive Bill France Jr. to work as an executive in NASCAR and as the CEO of Bob Barkhimer Associates (now known as California Auto Racing Speedways) in 1977. While working for NASCAR, he helped organize several major projects for the organization, primarily projects on the West Coast and outside of the United States. In addition, he helped stage local events under California Auto Racing Speedways. Clapp retired from NASCAR in 1999, remaining as a consultant for the company until 2019. Since his retirement, he has served as an executive in multiple hall of fame organizations, racetracks, and other non-racing related businesses.

Clapp is regarded as an influential figure in NASCAR's expansion from its traditional Southeastern base. During his time in NASCAR, Clapp played a key leadership role in developing NASCAR's reach outside of the American Southeast, organizing races on the American West Coast, Australia, Japan, and Mexico. Over his career, Clapp promoted thousands of single-day motorsports events across multiple series, including national touring events and local racing events.

== Early life ==
Charles Kendall Clapp was born on April 25, 1939, in Oakland, California. He is named after Charles Hirsch, an Oklahoma City department store chain owner who offered Clapp's mother a job, assisted her financially, and offered her a place to live when she was living in poverty during her childhood. His father, Robert Harmon Clapp (1905–1989), was an accountant for Western Electric, and his mother, Macil Omega Clapp (née Allison, 1906–1982), was a clothing line designer and the owner of Macil's Fashion, a chain of women's apparel stores. He described his parents as "pretty religious, and they were conservative, but they were not narrow-mined or overly strict". He additionally described his father as a "political person", having been a Democrat supporter until the election in 1948 in which Harry S. Truman won; as someone who opposed Truman, he became a "staunch Republican" afterward.

Early in his life, Clapp was raised in the San Francisco Bay Area. In December 1943, Clapp moved from Oakland to a rural farm in Walnut Creek; according to Clapp, the family moved due to fears of potential attacks on key military bases in the Bay Area during World War II, including Mare Island Naval Shipyard and Naval Station Treasure Island. After WWII ended, Clapp worked as a paperboy while attending elementary school. As a paperboy, he often stopped at Duke's Polly Hill Service, a car service station in Walnut Creek that often attracted local racecar drivers. Fred Erickson, the son of Duke's Polly Hill Service owner Duke and a racecar driver, introduced Clapp to auto racing and convinced Clapp and his father to attend a local race on October 7, 1951, at the San Joaquin County Fairgrounds. After attending two more races: a NASCAR Grand National Series (now known as the NASCAR Cup Series) event on the 14th at Oakland Speedway and a AAA Championship Car event at the Santa Clara County Fairgrounds on the 21st, Clapp stated that "I knew, somehow, I was going to be a part of this. All I needed to figure out was how I fit into the picture."

In 1953, while on a trip to San Jose with his mother, Clapp visited the offices of Bob Barkhimer Associates, meeting motorsports executive Margo Burke, who eventually became his mentor. Burke, who had no children, would eventually state that Clapp and NASCAR executive Bill France Jr. were "her children". In 1954, crafting a fake ID card, he applied to become a licensed NASCAR mechanic; after mailing his fake ID to NASCAR headquarters, NASCAR accepted the application. In the early 1950s, Clapp also met and later worked for stock car owner and mechanic Cosimo "Cos" Cancilla; Clapp described working for Cancilla as "an enormous impact on my life". As a racing crewman, Clapp worked for various drivers and teams. In addition to working for Cos, he was a part of the championship team of Danny Letner for the 1955 NASCAR Pacific Coast Grand National Division, a crew member at the 1956 Southern 500 for Harold Hardesty, and a crewman and qualifying substitute driver for Bob Keefe at the 1958 Crown America 500 at Riverside.

Clapp attended Acalanes High School, graduating in June 1957. While at Acalanes, he played gridiron football, baseball, and basketball for the school. After graduating, he went to Diablo Valley College before enlisting in the United States Navy in 1958, While serving in the Navy, he was stationed at Naval Air Station Point Mugu, where he remained for all of 1959. In February 1960, he was transferred to the USS Duncan. Clapp described himself as a "good military man", remarking that "I figured if I had to do something, I might as well do it to the best of my ability." He was able to be discharged from the Navy early in September 1960 after a conversation with LTJG Charlie Hawkins, one of Clapp's superiors, who successfully convinced commanding officers for his early discharge.

== Business and promotional career ==
=== Early ventures ===
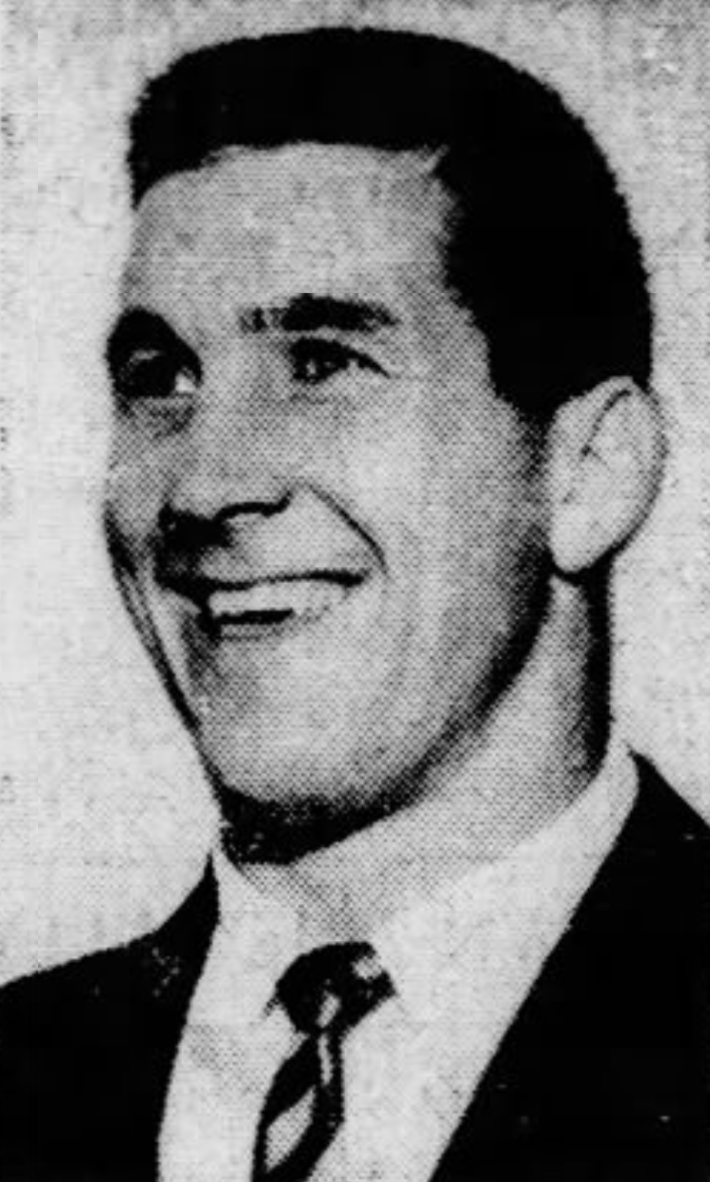
Football player and racing executive Les Richter (pictured in 1967) first met in 1962 while Clapp was working for Cos Cancilla. The two became lifelong business partners and friends afterward.

After his discharge from the Navy, Clapp took a job with the Weatherly Motor Company, a Chrysler and Dodge dealership, in Ventura, California. However, after five weeks with the company, he was let go after only selling one Chrysler within the period for less than the invoice price. After becoming friends with NAPA Auto Parts businessman Hubert Catlin, he took a job at Catlin's business in nearby Oxnard as an outside salesman. He left the job in the summer of 1961 to work as a general manager at his mother's business, Macil's Fashion, which had recently expanded to Lafayette. He described working at Macil's Fashion as "a lot like going to college. I learned so much about product, inventory control, and, importantly, how to manage people... I learned how to sell... That period made a businessman out of me. I believe that." He worked at the company until 1968, when the company was sold. During his time at Macil's Fashion, he reconnected with Cancilla and became friends with football player and eventual racing executive Les Richter; Richter would eventually become lifelong business partners and one of Clapp's closest friends, working on several major NASCAR projects together during their business careers.

In 1964, Clapp, his father, and retail store manager Chuck Schillings acquired the exclusive rights to sell The Beatles-branded pom-poms after seeing the band's popularity after their February 9, 1964, appearance on The Ed Sullivan Show. According to Clapp, before the collaboration, Schilling initially bought "fuzzy fur balls" with a clip to sell as shoe ornaments, which did not sell well. The three, forming the Beatle Pom-Pom Company, sold "more than 100,000" pom-poms in 1964, which Clapp stated was "more than we'd initially hoped for, but certainly less than we envisioned once we decided to go ahead".

==== Motorsports career beginnings ====
Clapp promoted his first motorsports events in 1966, collaborating with fellow Acalanes High School alummus and personal friend Gary Gorman to promote NASCAR-sanctioned races at Vallejo Speedway. Gorman, who was not a motorsports fan, joined Clapp because "it was a nice way of extending our friendship". The first event the duo ran occurred on July 31 for a NASCAR Pacific Coast Late Model (now known as the ARCA Menards Series West) race; despite hot temperatures and a large amount of discounted tickets sold for the event, the race drew a crowd of 3,700. According to Clapp, both he and Gorman each earned profits of $3,000 (adjusted for inflation, $29,769) from the event. The duo ran more events during the year at Vallejo that achieved further success, including an event on Labor Day weekend that made a profit of $17,000. Clapp and Gorman continued their partnership until 1968, running races at various Northern California racetracks, including Vallejo Speedway, Altamont Speedway, Shasta Speedway, and the Alameda County Fairgrounds. After a race at Vallejo in May 1968, Gorman stepped away from auto racing promoting due to a lack of interest; the two remained lifelong friends afterward.

From October 1969 until May 1970, Clapp was the vice president of public relations at Sonoma Raceway (pictured above).

After Macil's Fashion was sold in 1968, Clapp began to pursue a career in motorsports more heavily. Starting in 1967, with the help of San Francisco Chronicle writer Gordon Martin, Clapp began discussions with the owners of a project of what would eventually become Sears Point International Raceway (now known as Sonoma Raceway), which led to the owners giving him an offer to become a vice president and consultant at the track. The following year, Clapp signed a long-term lease to host United States Auto Club (USAC) and NASCAR-sanctioned races at Sears Point International Raceway (now known as Sonoma Raceway), which at the time was under construction. With the facility now complete in 1969, Clapp was hired as the vice president and director of public relations at Sears Point in October. His time at Sears Point was brief and lasted for under a year before the track was shut down in May 1970 due to financial issues. During his time at Sears Point, he took credit for canceling a concert at the facility in what would eventually be known as the infamous Altamont Free Concert, which was originally set to be held at Sears Point but was cancelled and moved on short-notice to Altamont Speedway. According to Clapp, he was convinced to call his superiors to argue the cancellation of the concert after witnessing a 13-year-old woman with a newborn baby, which was accepted. After the track's shutdown, he was tasked by Filmways to try and sell the track to potential buyers for six months; however, all refused the asking price of $7.5 million set by the track's owners. Clapp later described the asking price as "very optimistic on the part of Filmways".

After his departure from Sears Point, Clapp began to heavily consider a job offer from Russ Goebel of auto racing newspaper Autoweek, which he had previously rejected due to his job at Sears Point. He accepted it in 1970, with his position "combin[ing] marketing, looking into potential new deals, and thinking about ways to more strongly present our publication to the public and to the industry". During his time at Autoweek, he played a key role in increasing its publication from 50,000 to 77,000 within the span of a year. He left the company in 1972 after internal conflicts with the company's management and after the company moved its operations to Sparks, Nevada. After turning down separate offers to work for Bob Barkheimer Associates and later the Atlanta International Raceway (now known as the Atlanta Motor Speedway) to become their president, Clapp was hired as a sales manager at Varner–Ward Leasing, a vehicle leasing company, shortly after his departure from Autoweek. He remained at Varner–Ward until 1974, after the company had gone through consolidation due to financial troubles. Additionally, Clapp wanted to go back to motorsports business full-time. While working at Varner–Ward, Clapp strengthened his friendship with future NASCAR president Bill France Jr., which Clapp credited to an renewed friendship starting at an August 1973 NASCAR race at Laguna Seca.

In May 1974, Clapp was hired as the general manager of Altamont Speedway, which at the time was struggling both financially and with its reputation. Clapp agreed on the basis that he would not commit to the job long-term and that he would "do what I could". Clapp's time at Altamont was unsuccessful due to low attendance, and he departed the job by August of that year. He later blamed a multitude of external factors during his tenure at Altamont, including heavy wind, a smell of rotten eggs due to a nearby well that had large amounts of sulfur, power failures, foul-smelling bathrooms, and the track's reputation from the Altamont Free Concert. Clapp remarked in a 2009 SFGate interview that "The losses were huge. For every home run, there were 99 failures." After leaving, he worked short stints at various businesses from 1975 until 1976. He first collaborated with engine tuner Dave DeLoretto in 1975, creating an engine supplier company named Victory Associates. However, after numerous customers experienced engine failures, Clapp left the partnership within the year on friendly terms. In January 1976, he was hired by personal friend and home remodeling businessman Bob Link to work at his business, Linco Custom Home Remodeling, spending nearly a year at the company.

=== NASCAR years ===
While working for Bob Link, in January 1977, Clapp was called by NASCAR executive Bill France Jr., where he was offered the job as the marketing director for NASCAR's operations in the Western United States. He accepted the position within the month, working with both NASCAR and Bob Barkhimer Associates (BBA), the latter of which he worked as a vice president. By the end of the year, Burke began paperwork to sell 75% of BBA to Clapp, giving him operational control. The purchase, which included all of Burke's shares and half of Barkhimer's, was finalized by New Year's Eve of 1977. With the purchase, Clapp gained operational control of 12 racetracks owned by BBA. Four years later, Clapp bought out the rest of Barkhimer's shares in the now-named California Auto Racing Speedways, Inc., and shortly after was able to expand to 19 racetracks. In March 1983, Clapp, Les Richter, and France Jr. began negotiations with Bonnie Marchbanks to buy the abandoned Hanford Motor Speedway for $900,000, with plans to renovate the facility to host Cup Series racing. However, the group failed to follow-up with Marchbanks in the following months due to them feeling that following-up was not "necessary, because we'd been told that there was no urgent movement to sell the place"; Clapp later described the decision as an "honest mistake". Two months later, the group found out the track was sold to a dairy company who bought the track for $1,300,000, demolishing the track for grazing land.

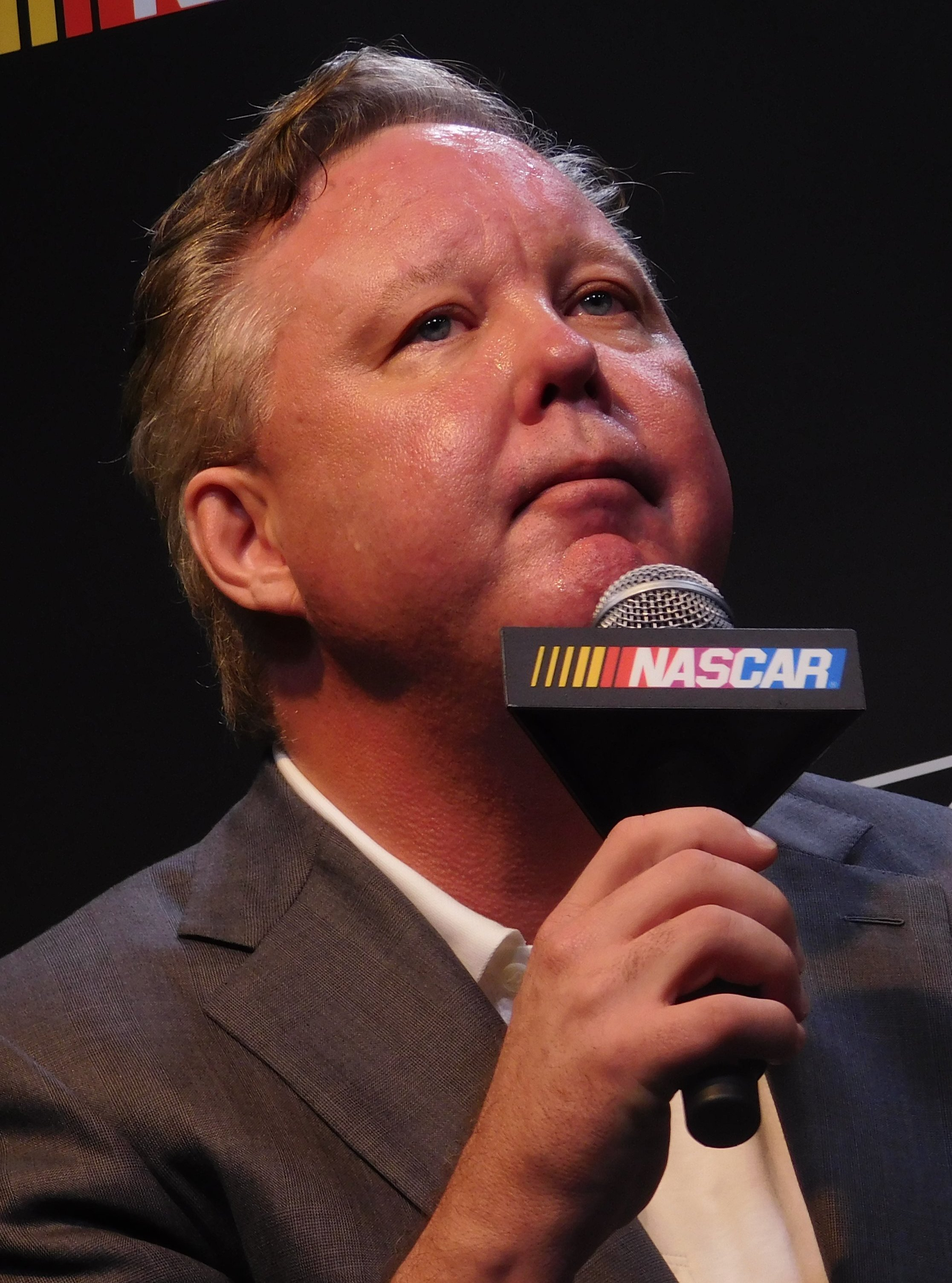
During 1984, Ken and his then-wife, Jackie, housed and mentored eventual NASCAR president Brian France (pictured in 2016).

On December 16, 1983, Clapp was promoted to NASCAR's vice president of western operations. Two months after, Ken and Jackie welcomed eventual successor to Bill France Jr. as NASCAR's president, Brian France, to their home. Brian, who was mentored by Ken, stayed approximately seven months at the Clapps' home. Beginning in 1987, Clapp and France Jr. proposed plans to pave the track at the Santa Clara County Fairgrounds for the potential to host Cup Series racing due to the impending closure of Riverside International Raceway. A plan for the track was officially submitted in December, which included plans to expand seating capacity and pave the track at a cost of $4–5 million. However, the plan fell through after the duo were dissatisfied at the Santa Clara County Board of Supervisors' response to the project. According to Clapp, the duo felt they were treated poorly by the supervisors, including an instance where a supervisor pressured France Jr. to make several renovations unrelated to the track "in a way that sound[ed] almost dismissive". After the failed San Jose proposal, Riverside's two Cup Series dates were moved to Sonoma Raceway and Phoenix International Raceway (now known as Phoenix Raceway); both moves were organized by Clapp.

In 1994, Clapp joined the board of directors of the then-planned Las Vegas Motor Speedway, headed by Richie Clyne, William Bennett, and Ralph Engelstad. However, he resigned from his position in August 1996 after Engelstad "was constantly asking when LVMS would get a Cup date" to no avail despite pushes by both Clapp and Engelstad. However, he remained involved in obtaining a Cup Series date for the track, finalizing a deal with France Jr. in 1997 to host its first Cup Series race in 1998. In 1996, Clapp was moved to become NASCAR's vice president of marketing development, where he worked with Brian France. A year later, Clapp served as a consultant for the 1997 made-for-TV film Steel Chariots.

==== Involvement in attempted NASCAR expansion to Japan ====
Beginning in 1990, Clapp went on a series of trips to Japan to negotiate with Japanese promoters on the possibility of hosting a NASCAR-sanctioned race in the country, with hopes of hosting the first race by 1992 according to Tom Higgins of The Charlotte Observer. Although races in Japan were scheduled in 1992 at the Fuji Speedway according to the San Francisco Chronicle, the event was scrapped after the Japanese stock index, the Nikkei 225, experienced a meltdown that eventually led to a decades-long economic stagnation period in Japan known as the Lost Decades. Clapp, this time with Brian France, began negotiations again to host a race in Japan starting in 1993, finalizing a deal in 1995 for a race at the Suzuka Circuit in 1996. The race ran at Suzuka for two years before moving to Twin Ring Motegi for two more years. The project was scrapped after the 1999 event due to lower than expected crowds in NASCAR's race in Japan. Clapp later stated in his 2022 autobiography that "we all worked hard to beat the drums for these races... but you can never predict with certainty how you'll be receive when you introduce a sport that is foreign — literally and figuratively — to a new audience."

==== Involvement in founding of NASCAR Truck Series ====
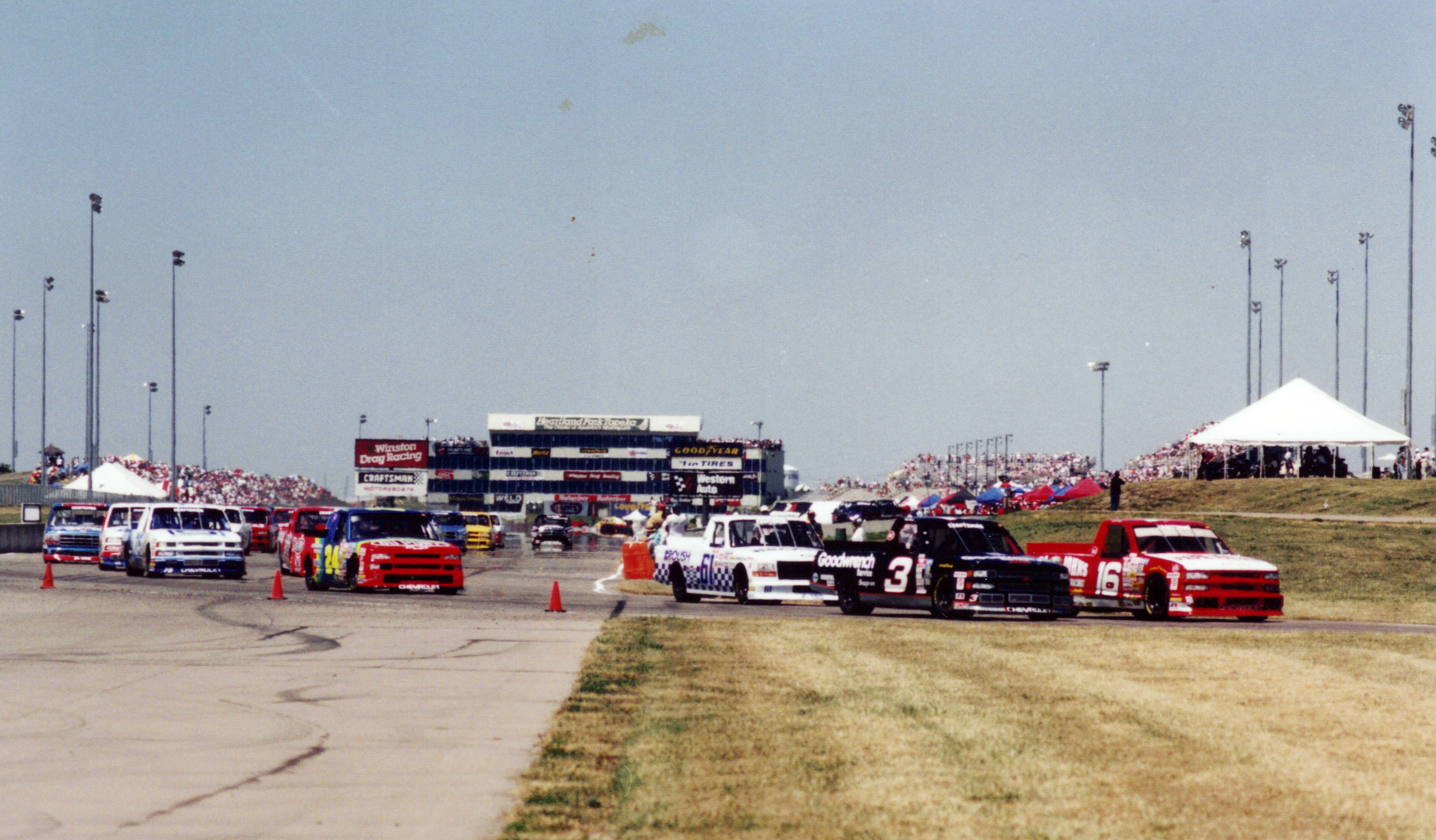
A NASCAR Truck Series race in 1995. Clapp played a key role in the founding and creation of the series. Although originally selected to oversee it, he was replaced by Dennis Huth before the series' first full season in 1995.

In 1992, Clapp began discussions with France Jr. alongside five California off-road racers consisting of Dick Landfield, Jim Venable, Jim Smith, Bill Stroppe, and Frank Vessels to negotiate the possibility of hosting a paved truck racing series in NASCAR as a support series for the NASCAR Winston West Series (now known as the ARCA Menards West Series). After discussions with France Jr. he approved the construction of a test truck in the winter of 1993. A test truck constructed by racing driver Gary Collins was completed nearing the end of the year. The first exhibition races with the truck were run in 1994, with P. J. Jones winning the first event at Mesa Marin Raceway on July 30. Although Clapp was originally appointed to oversee the series, at the start of the 1995 season, he was replaced with Dennis Huth, with top NASCAR leadership transforming the series' from Clapp's original plans of a support series on the West Coast to a national touring series. Clapp later stated that "[NASCAR management] were looking farther down the road than I had been. And, honestly, the Truck Series caught on, nationally, much faster than I thought it would."

=== Retirement from NASCAR, transition to consultant ===
In February 1999, Clapp retired from his position as NASCAR's senior vice president of marketing development; however, remained with NASCAR as an independent consultant in which what Clapp described as "something agreed on a handshake with Bill [France] Jr." In 2005, Clapp, in collaboration with Mexican businessmen Carlos Slim and Carlos Slim Domit, negotiated the hosting of NASCAR Busch Series (now known as the NASCAR O'Reilly Auto Parts Series) events at the Autódromo Hermanos Rodríguez starting that year, which were the first events NASCAR held in Mexico. In the same year, Clapp alongside Stockton 99 Speedway majority owner Bob Hunefeld announced in September that they were considering selling the track despite a previous statement given earlier in the year to The Stockton Record that the duo had no intent of selling. A deal to sell the track was made in January 2006 to Wilson Way Development, with plans being made to demolish the track to make way for a housing development. However, Wilson Way Development experienced severe financial troubles in 2007, leading to the purchase falling through the following year due to missed payments. Within 2008, local racer Tony Noceti acquired the track's lease, saving the facility.

Clapp served as a consultant for two more motorsports-related movies, including 2005 Disney film Herbie: Fully Loaded and the 2006 comedy film Talladega Nights: The Ballad of Ricky Bobby. In 2009, he began a stint as a voter for inducting members into the NASCAR Hall of Fame, starting with the organization's inaugural 2010 class. The following year, Clapp was elected to the board of directors for the National Hot Rod Association (NHRA); he held the position for seven years before leaving the organization. In 2013, Clapp was appointed as a consultant for the Iowa Speedway after the facility was purchased by NASCAR, guiding the track's new management. In 2019, Clapp ended his consultancy with NASCAR after the sanctioning body cut him. In his autobiography, he stated that the termination of his consultancy "bothered me" but that he was "not mad" at the decision, stating that "it was just disappointing, because I didn't see it coming". Since his retirement from NASCAR, Clapp has been involved heavily in several businesses. He is currently the chairman of the West Coast Stock Car/Motorsports Hall of Fame, having been involved since the organization was formed in 2002. He is also on the board of directors of World Wide Technology Raceway, the Motorsports Hall of Fame of America, and the National Midget Auto Racing Hall of Fame. Outside of racing, he is an investor in a nursery business he has been involved in since 1982 and iPull-uPull, a car salvage company. In 2022, Clapp published an autobiography alongside racing historian Bones Bourcier, which covered his experiences and motorsports history on the American West Coast. According to Clapp, the book, which took three years to write with Bourcier, was a "pressure initiative" made to "restore the history of the West".

== Personal life ==
Clapp met his first wife, Peggy Jean Baradat, while serving in the United States Navy in 1959. They were married from October 1959 until May 1970, when they divorced. In 1973, Clapp married Jacqueline "Jackie" Merle Osborn, who was a co-worker during his time at Varner–Ward Leasing. They remained married until 1995, when Jackie died due to cancer on December 20. On March 22, 1998, Clapp married his third wife, Delores "Dee" Rhea Gravett. Clapp first interacted with Delores' family in 1992 after Delores' daughter, Stacey, called Clapp in hopes of gaining advice for starting a sports marketing agency, eventually forming a friendship with both Stacey and Dee. The two eventually started dating in late 1996 according to Clapp. In his autobiography, Clapp stated that he was left in a "strange mindset" in marrying another woman after Jackie's death, but eventually stated that "time really is the great healer". The two were married until 2024, when Dee died on November 16.

Clapp had two children while married to Peggy: Sheri and Michelle. Sheri, his older daughter, was born on August 11, 1960, while Clapp was in the Navy. His younger daughter, Michelle, was born on April 10, 1963. Michelle died on March 10, 2005, after a heart attack. Ken later revealed in his autobiography that the heart attack was due to a drug overdose, which was linked to chronic long-term pain from a car accident Michelle was involved in 1981 which affected her personality and led to an addiction to painkillers and street drugs. While married to Jackie, he had one stepson, Rick Farren.

== Legacy and honors ==
The amount of races Clapp promoted varies by source. NASCAR's Reid Spencer stated that "by his own estimation, [he] promoted more than 4,800 single-day racing events". In his autobiography published in 2022, co-author Bones Bourcier wrote that "Clapp's guess is that he had a direct role in 'a bit more than 6,000' single-day events". In a 2006 Modesto Bee interview, former NASCAR chief executive officer and chairman Brian France described Clapp as "a pioneer", adding, "there's not many like him, certainly not many who want to coach and help. There's not a lot of people who have his perspective and who want to jump in and help when you need him." Davey Segal, a longtime NASCAR journalist and reporter for Racer, compared him to "the Big Bill France west of the Mississippi". In an article for the ARCA Racing Series, Brandon White described Clapp as a key figure for the growth of the ARCA Racing Series West.

=== Recognition ===
- In 1980, Clapp was named as the Promoter of the Year by the Motor Sports Press Association.
- In 2002, Clapp was inducted in the inaugural class of the West Coast Stock Car/Motorsports Hall of Fame.
- In 2006, Clapp was inducted in the Motor Sports Press Association Hall of Fame.
- In 2008, Clapp was inducted to the Sonoma Raceway Wall of Fame.
- In 2026, Clapp was inducted to the California Auto Racing Hall of Fame.
