= Vic Edelbrock =

American businessman (1913–1962)

Otis Victor Edelbrock, Sr. (August 16, 1913 – November 11, 1962) was an American automotive aftermarket performance parts engineer, racer and is considered one of the founders of the American hot rod movement Victor, known as "Vic", established Edelbrock Corporation in Beverly Hills in 1938 and is the father to Otis Victor Edelbrock, Jr., who was from 1962 to 2010 president and was CEO of the Edelbrock Corporation until 2017.

== Early years ==
Vic Sr. was born in 1913 in Eudora, Kansas, a small farming community in northeast Kansas. After the family grocery store burned down in 1927, Vic left school at the age of 14 to help support the family by ferrying Model T Fords from Wichita to the many outlying farms in the area. The frequent stops to replace parts that shook loose on the region's dirt roads made Vic an expert in impromptu repair work. Soon after, he found work in a local repair shop, working as an auto mechanic. Vic also picked up extra cash running moonshine for local bootleggers

In 1931, the Great Depression hit Kansas, and Edelbrock decided to follow his two older brothers and emigrate to California. Initially, he lived with his brother Carl and took a job as an auto mechanic. In order to earn some extra money to open his own repair shop, Vic took an evening job in downtown Los Angeles parking cars at a large apartment complex. It was a chance encounter at this parking complex where Vic bumped into a 19-year-old Irish girl named Katherine (Katie) Collins, who was working as a day maid. Despite the fact that Katie was engaged, Vic managed to convince her to give him a chance and not marry her fiancé. Vic and Katie married in June 1933, just eight weeks after meeting.

== Mechanic ==
Edelbrock's garage on the corner of Hancock and Avalon in Los Angeles. ca. 1930's

He opened a repair garage on Wilshire Boulevard in Beverly Hills. The business experienced growth in 1934 and relocated to the corner of Venice Boulevard and Hoover in Los Angeles. Bobby Meeks was hired as an assistant at the age of 15 and would continue to work for Edelbrock his entire life.

Between 1934 and the start of World War II, the small repair garage relocated three more times. Vic, Jr. was born in 1936. Two years later in 1938, he purchased a project car, a 1932 Ford Roadster hot rod. For this car, Victor designed and manufactured the first product to feature the Edelbrock name, the Slingshot manifold, which essentially launched the new business known as Edelbrock. Edelbrock took the car to the Bonneville Salt Flats, and went 121.42 MPH weeks before America joined World War II.

During the war, Vic's machinist skills were put to work welding in the Long Beach shipyards and hand fabricating aircraft parts. First Vic worked at the Todd Shipyards, then later Edelbrock went to work for Len Saulter, machining parts from newly developed exotic metals. This work was categorized as critical to the war effort and would keep Vic from being drafted for the remainder of the war.

== Racing fame ==
A major source of Edelbrock's fame in automotive racing was as a car owner. Offenhauser motors had a great power advantage over all of the other engines. Rodger Ward used Edelbrock's V8-60 "shaker" midget car on August 10, 1950 to break the Offenhauser-equipped winning streak at the legendary Gilmore Stadium using his secret blend of nitromethane. Edelbrock and Ward followed up the win by travelling to Orange Show Stadium in San Bernardino and winning the following night. This feat was never duplicated in the history of midget racing. The wins propelled Ward's career and Edelbrock Corporation. Nitro is now banned from almost all forms of dirt track racing (due to the required high maintenance costs). However, nitromethane is now the industry standard as fuel in all top fuel dragsters and funny cars in drag racing.

== Manufacturing ==
Vic achieved an industry first in 1958 by getting one horsepower per cubic inch from a 283 Chevy small-block with the new Cross Ram manifold.

In 1962, cancer claimed the life of Vic at the age of 49. His son, Vic Jr., just 26 at the time, assumed the position of president of the company and held it until 2010.

== Career awards ==
- He was named to the SEMA hall of fame 1977.
- He was inducted in the International Drag Racing Hall of Fame in 1994.
- He was inducted in the National Midget Auto Racing Hall of Fame in 2005.
- He was inducted into the Motorsports Hall of Fame of America in 2012.
- He was inducted into the Automotive Hall of Fame in 2024.

== See also ==
- Edelbrock
- Vic Edelbrock, Jr.
