= Competition Cams =

Competition Cams, Inc.
- Type: Privately held company
- Industry: Automotive aftermarket
- Founded: Memphis, Tennessee, USA (in 1976; 50 years ago)
- Founder: John McWhirter, Ivars Smiltniks, Tom Woitesek, Bob Woodard
- Headquarters: Memphis, Tennessee
- Key people: Chris Douglas, CEO & President
- Products: Automotive parts
- Number of employees: 100-250 (2004)
- Parent: Industrial Opportunity Partners
- Divisions: Automotive; Motorcycle; Go-kart
- Website: www.compcams.com

Competition Cams, Inc., often styled as COMP Cams, is a specialty performance automotive aftermarket, motorcycle, and kart parts manufacturer. The company has five US locations including headquarters in Olive Branch, Mississippi.

== History ==
Although founded in 1976, Competition Cams wasn't incorporated until 1977, when it began by selling valve train products through satellite distribution stores. The company has acquired manufacturers of transmissions, electronic fuel injection, and nitrous oxide systems through its holding group, COMP Performance Group, consisting of 13 companies.

In the late 1980s, the company contributed to the Specialty Equipment Market Association (SEMA), and its annual trade show in the Las Vegas Convention Center. Competition Cams was started by John McWhirter, Ivars Smiltniks, Tom Woitesek, and Bob Woodard. Former owners, Ron Coleman and Paul Brothers were inducted into the SEMA Hall of Fame in 2000 and 2005, respectively.

In January 2020, Competition Cams was acquired by private equity group Industrial Opportunity Partners.

== Industry contributions ==
COMP Cams created the "Spintron" engine testing system, which uses an electric motor to drive a dummy engine outfitted with high-speed sensors and cameras to record data about the valvetrain dynamics. The test observes valve-spring seat pressure, coil dynamics, camshaft and pushrod flex, and lifter movement to identify problems in the engine's performance.

A partnership between Richard Childress Racing, Okuma, and COMP Cams was established to develop the process for grinding camshafts for NASCAR engines, with an Okuma GC34NH cylindrical grinder; a CNC grinder.

COMP Cams developed the process of ion nitriding for camshafts, or Pro Plasma Nitriding. This is a 36-hour process that uses pulsed nitrogen plasma in a vacuum controlled environment to embed chains of nitrogen ions into the camshaft surface approximately .008” - .010” deep, significantly hardening the surface.

COMP Cams also developed a new surface finishing process called Micro Surface Enhancement (MSE). By removing peaks from the surface finish (speaking in nanoscale terms), it improves bearing surface performance and life span of camshaft lobes and bearing journals. The appearance of this new process is somewhat reminiscent of the development of superfinishing in the 1930s in the respect that a new metalworking process for surface finish improvement was developed in the quest for better shaft life span in automobile engines.

== Sponsorship ==
Competition Cams does not sponsor a NASCAR team directly, but has access to advertising through a deal with NASCAR where the COMP Cams contingency sticker is placed on every NASCAR race car. Contingency sponsorship is a common form of 'after the fact' sponsorship whereby racers place stickers on their vehicles from companies that post monetary awards to racing teams for winning, in exchange for visibility and the right to use images of the driver and their car in promotional literature and advertising. Similarly, COMP Cams also posts contingency awards to drag racers and various other classes of auto racing.
