= Vic Edelbrock Jr. =

American businessman (1936–2017)

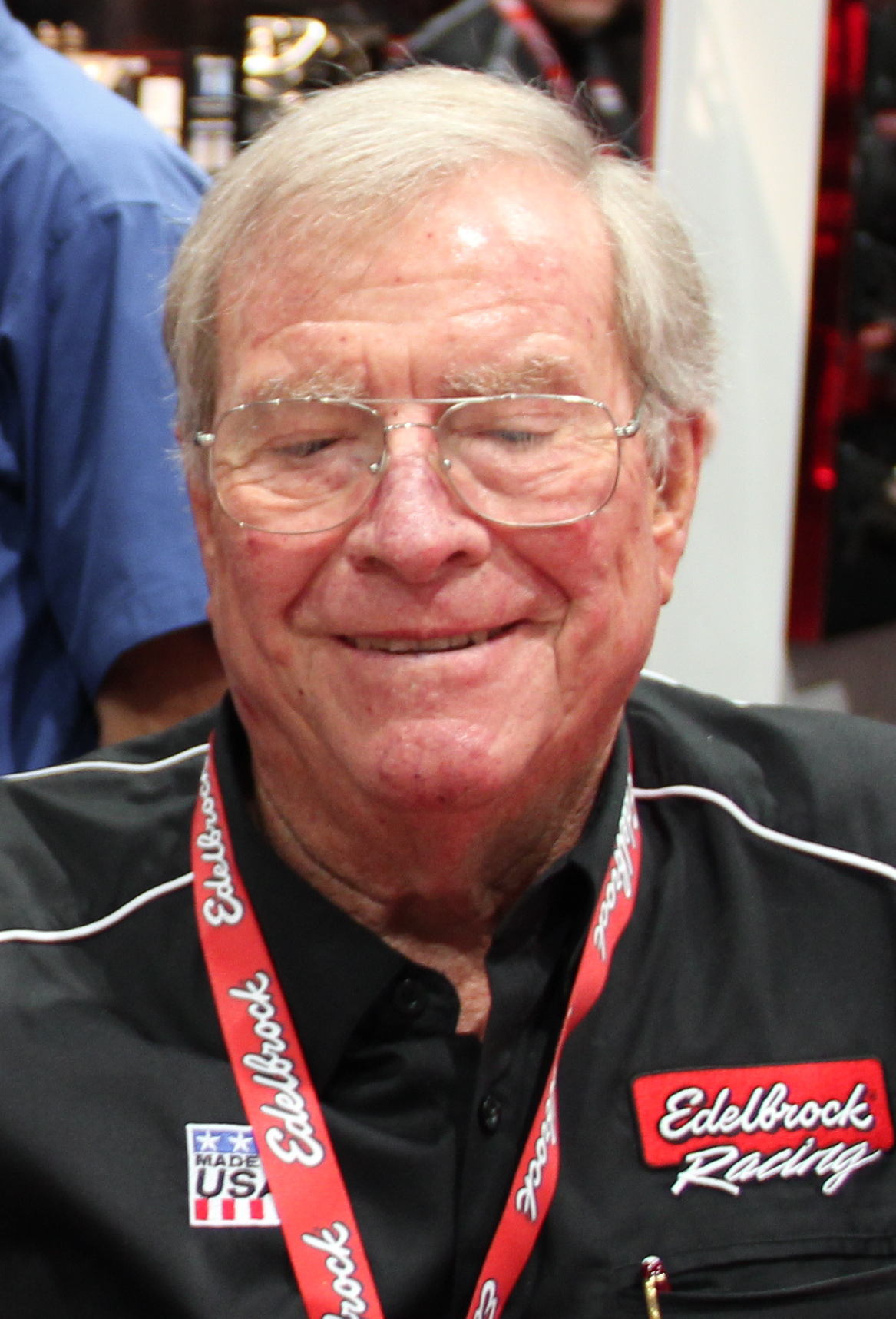
Edelbrock in 2012

Otis Victor "Vic" Edelbrock Jr. (August 23, 1936 – June 9, 2017) was the son and only child of famed mechanic and Edelbrock founder, Vic Edelbrock. He was the president of Edelbrock from 1962 until his death in his home in Rolling Hills, California at age 80.

== Early years ==
After graduating from Dorsey High School, Vic received a football scholarship to the University of Southern California(USC) and joined the Delta Tau Delta fraternity and graduated in 1958 with a degree in business from USC. Vic joined the Reserve Officers' Training Corps (ROTC), hoping to become a fighter pilot. Vic was scheduled to graduate second lieutenant and had been accepted to flight school. After Congress passed a law making it mandatory to serve five years to earn combat wings, instead of three years, Vic gave up his dream and went back to helping his father run the family business.

Vic met his wife Nancy Crook during his senior year during rehearsals for Songfest charity show at the Hollywood Bowl. She was a member of Kappa Alpha Theta, the sorority chosen for the annual show. They were officially engaged on Christmas in 1958 and married at Our Savior's Chapel at USC on March 21, 1959.

== Business management ==
After the death of his father Vic Sr. in 1962, Vic Jr., age 26 at the time, took over to lead the company as president and CEO. He held both positions until 2010, when he stepped down as president; he remained chairman of the board of directors. At the time he took the reins, the company consisted of just ten employees and annual sales were $450,000. For the next several decades, Vic helped grow the company his dad created into a major name among hot-rodders, sanctioned drag racing and short track motor racing. The company grew considerably with Vic, Jr. as president and 2004 revenue exceeded $125 million.

Vic served as the president of the Specialty Equipment Market Association (SEMA) from 1971 to 1974 and was on the board of directors from 1967 to 1989.

== Flying ==
Vic earned his Private Pilot certificate in 1968. He rented Bob Hedman's (of Hedman Hedders) airplane to learn to fly. Once a week, Vic flew the company plane from Edelbrock's headquarters in Torrance, California to the company's foundry, located in San Jacinto.

== Other hobbies ==
Edelbrock and his family were regulars at the Monterey Historic Automobile Races at Mazda Raceway Laguna Seca in Monterey, California. They usually drove Ford Mustangs. Vic Edelbrock drove a 1963 Corvette Z06 Coupe at the Monterey Historics (Now called the Monterey Motorsports Reunion) and a 1970 Ford Mustang Fastback.

== Career awards ==
- He was selected as the fourth recipient of the Robert E. Petersen Lifetime Achievement Award in 2005 for his contributions to the evolution and prosperity of specialized automobiles.
- He was inducted in the International Drag Racing Hall of Fame.
- He was selected to the SEMA Hall of Fame.
- He was named "Person of the Year" by the Performance Warehouse Association, in 1982 and 1987
- He was inducted into the "Automotive Hall of Fame" in 2024 posthumously.

== Quotes ==
"I've played football at USC, raced ocean boats and ski boats, but I've never felt anything like the adrenaline rush I get in a race car."
