= Bill Zaring =

American racing driver

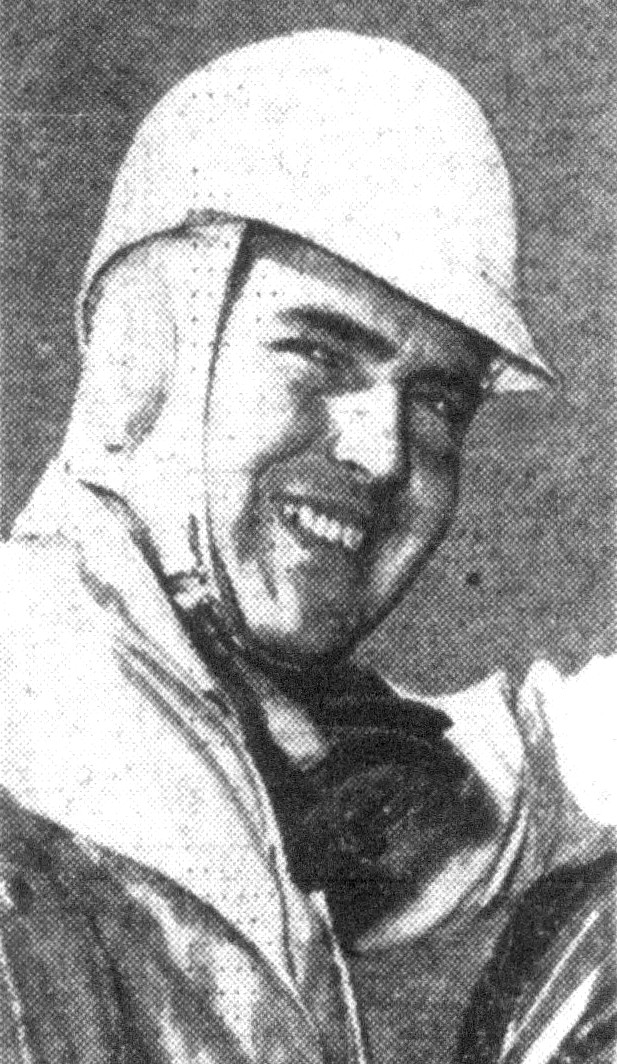
Zaring, circa 1950

Bill Zaring (August 24, 1917 – May 19, 2003) was an American racecar driver who raced midget cars in Southern California. A native of Southern California, he was born in North Hollywood.

== Racing ==
Zaring earned his name of "Daring" Bill Zaring and "Wild Bill" due to his aggressive style of racing on the oval track. He began racing in 1938 in Colton, California. He, finished in the money consistently and won the URA Red Circuit title in 1948. Zaring was one of the many drivers who raced for the Edelbrock racing team.

Zaring won the first main event at the Orange Show Stadium in San Bernardino.

On November 23, 1950, Zaring won the 'Midget Grand Prix' (now Turkey Night Grand Prix), which was the final event at famed Gilmore Stadium

Zaring raced big cars (now known as Indy Cars) from 1948 to 1955, which were big when compared to midget cars. He never achieved the fame racing them as when he did while driving midgets.
