= Bob Barkhimer =

American NASCAR executive

Robert Barkhimer (March 2, 1916 – June 17, 2006), nicknamed "Barky", was a promoter on the West Coast of the United States. He was born in Berkeley, California. His career started as a midget car racer and ended as a senior vice president at NASCAR.

== Racing career ==
In 1937, Barkhimer developed an interest in midget car racing in Emeryville, California. His first car came from a man named Delucci, who offered the car for free to Barkhimer in the even that he was able to repossess it from a car thief. Barkhimer located the car dismantled in boxes, loaded the pieces up, and had it reassembled by a local racer named Jimmy Aiten, in exchange for allowing Aiten to drive it. Due to an issue with the spark plugs, the engine was destroyed and the damaged vehicle was then returned to Delucci.

In 1945, Barkhimer won the Bay City Racing Association (BCRA) championship, winning six total events that season.

In 1946, Barkhimer won ten total events.

In 1947, Barkhimer won four total events, before he was injured and unable to continue racing.

== Promoter ==
In 1948, due to his injuries, Barkhimer quit racing to become the Business Manager for BCRA.

In 1949, Barkhimer took over San Jose Speedway. At that time, midget cars appeared to be losing their popular appeal, so he ended the midget class in favor of a hardtop late model stock car division, leading to an increase in fans. Also in 1949, Barkhimer and Jerry Piper started their own association called California Stock Car Racing Association (CSCRA). They eventually promoted 21 or 22 racetracks on the West Coast.

In 1954, Barkhimer met Bill France Jr., then his father, NASCAR founder Bill France Sr. After developing a personal relationship with each of them, Bill France Sr. had ten of Barkhimer's race tracks become NASCAR sanctioned. These included the Stockton 99 and multiple tracks in Oakland, Fresno, San Jose, and the Hughes Stadium in Sacramento.

Barkhimer became a Senior Vice President in NASCAR. During his career, he had also promoted boxing, car shows, roller derbies, and wrestling. He retired after his first wife died in 1976. He had promoted 3000 races in his career. Barkhimer and Burke sold out to Ken Clapp. After retiring, he traveled and wrote stories about the early years of racing.

== Personal life ==
He married the former Mary Cecil Slattery of Alameda in 1936. After she died, he married Jean Hightower in 1980. She died in 2005. Barkhimer had a son, Bill, and three daughters, Shirley, Bonnie, and Judy.

== Awards ==
He was inducted in the West Coast Stock Car Hall of Fame as a member of its inaugural class in 2002.
