= Wolf-Udo Ettel =

German World War II fighter pilot

- Ettel as a Leutnant
- Born: 26 February 1921; Free City of Hamburg, German Empire
- Died: 17 July 1943 (aged 22) near Lentini, Sicily, Fascist Italy
- Cause of death: Killed in action
- Burial place: war cemetery at Motta Sant'Anastasia
- Military career
- Allegiance: Nazi Germany
- Branch: Luftwaffe
- Service years: 1939–1943
- Rank: Oberleutnant (first lientenant)
- Units: JG 3, JG 27
- Commands: 8./JG 27
- Conflicts: See battles World War II; Air campaigns: European air campaign; Land campaigns: Mediterranean theatre †; Siege of Malta; Eastern Front; Battle of Stalingrad; Kuban bridgehead
- Awards: Knight's Cross of the Iron Cross with Oak Leaves (posthumous)

Wolf-Udo Ettel (26 February 1921 – 17 July 1943) was a German World War II Luftwaffe flying ace and a posthumous recipient of the Knight's Cross of the Iron Cross with Oak Leaves, the highest award in the military and paramilitary forces of Nazi Germany during World War II. Ettel is listed with 124 aerial victories—that is, 124 aerial combat encounters resulting in the destruction of the enemy aircraft—claimed in over 250 missions. He was killed in action by anti-aircraft artillery on 17 July 1943 over Fascist Italy.

== Early life and schooling ==
Ettel was born on 26 February 1921 in Hamburg in the Weimar Republic. He was the son of a representative of the Junkers aircraft manufacture. Due to his father's work, the family lived in Teheran and in Colombia where he attended the German school. Following his parents' divorce and return to Germany in 1934, he and his two younger brothers attended the Potsdam National Political Institutes of Education (Nationalpolitische Erziehungsanstalt—Napola) which was a secondary boarding school founded under the recently established Nazi state. The goal of the Napola schools was to raise a new generation for the political, military and administrative leadership of Nazi Germany.

== World War II ==
World War II in Europe began on Friday 1 September 1939 when German forces invaded Poland. On 15 November 1939, Ettel volunteered for military service in the Luftwaffe. Following various training courses, he attended blind flying school in January 1941 and passed his A/B pilot license at Prenzlau. (Note: Flight training in the Luftwaffe progressed through the levels A1, A2 and B1, B2, referred to as A/B flight training. A training included theoretical and practical training in aerobatics, navigation, long-distance flights and dead-stick landings. The B courses included high-altitude flights, instrument flights, night landings, and training to handle the aircraft in difficult situations.) He then attended a Jagdfliegerschule (fighter pilot training school) based in Paris, France. In September 1941, he was posted to a Ergänzungs-Jagdgruppe (supplementary fighter group), a fighter pilot training unit based in Denmark.

On 10 April 1942, Leutnant Ettel was posted to 4. Staffel (squadron) of Jagdgeschwader 3 "Udet" (JG 3—3rd Fighter Wing), (Note: On 1 December 1941, JG 3 was given the honorary name "Udet" following the suicide of World War I fighter pilot and Luftwaffe Generalleutnant Ernst Udet.) a II. Gruppe (2nd group) squadron. At the time, II. Gruppe had been placed under the overall command of Jagdgeschwader 53 (JG 53—53rd Fighter Wing) and was based at San Pietro Clarenza, Sicily, flying combat missions during the Siege of Malta.

=== Eastern Front ===
On 5 May 1942, Adolf Hitler issued his directive No. 41 which summarized his orders for the summer campaign in the Soviet Union and resulted in Case Blue, the Wehrmacht plan for the 1942 strategic summer offensive in southern Russia. In preparation for this campaign, II. Gruppe was moved to the Eastern Front, arriving in Pilsen from Sicily on 27 April. The Gruppe was then placed under the command of Hauptmann Kurt Brändle and refit for the summer campaign. After three weeks of rest, II. Gruppe, as part of the VIII. Fliegerkorps, was placed on the left wing of Army Group South and ordered to relocate to an airfield at Chuguyev, first elements arriving on 19 May. On 24 June, II. Gruppe moved to Shchigry, a forward airfield approximated 50 kilometers (31 miles) east of Kursk close to the front lines. That day, Ettel claimed his first two victories when he shot down two Ilyushin Il-2 "Shturmovik" ground-attack aircraft.

He, himself, was shot down approximately 15 km (9.3 mi) north Voronezh on 10 July while destroying a Soviet-flown Douglas Boston bomber, his seventh claim in total. He bailed out of his damaged Messerschmitt Bf 109 F-4 "White 1" (Werknummer 8383—factory number) behind Soviet lines, swam across the Don River and returned to his unit four days later. On 24 July 1942, he received the Iron Cross 2nd Class (Eisernes Kreuz 2. Klasse) and the Iron Cross 1st Class (Eisernes Kreuz 1. Klasse) on 2 August. Ettel claimed his 20 aerial victory on 9 August, his 30th on 7 October, and was awarded the Front Flying Clasp of the Luftwaffe for Fighter Pilots (Frontflugspange für Jagdflieger) on 23 October. Three further claims were filed on 31 October, his last victories in 1942, leading to the presentation of the German Cross in Gold (Deutsches Kreuz in Gold) in December 1942.

Following the German loss in the Battle of Stalingrad, 4. Staffel was relocated to the Kuban bridgehead on 5 April. During the months of intensive operations, Ettel claimed 28 Soviet aircraft shot down in March and 36 more in April, including five shot down on 11 April, an "ace-in-a-day" achievement. On 28 April 1943, Ettel claimed his 100th aerial victory. He was the 38th Luftwaffe pilot to achieve the century mark. In early May, II. Gruppe was moved to Kharkiv, from where they operated over the combat area east of Belgorod, operating in this area from 2 to 6 May. On 6 May, the Gruppe claimed twelve aerial victories, including four by Ettel, taking his total to 104.

On 11 May, Ettel claimed his 120th victory, his last on the Eastern Front, but was shot down by anti-aircraft fire, resulting in a forced landing of his Bf 109 G-4 (Werknummer 19 453) between the front lines, west of Anastassiewskaja. During his return to German held territory, Ettel came under heavy rifle fire from Soviet infantry but escaped unharmed. That same night Ettel led a Wehrmacht patrol to his damaged aircraft to salvage important equipment. Ettel was awarded the Knight's Cross of the Iron Cross (Ritterkreuz des Eisernen Kreuzes) on 1 June. The presentation was made by General der Jagdflieger Adolf Galland while Ettel was on vacation in Berlin.

=== Mediterranean Theatre and death ===
Promoted to Oberleutnant (first lieutenant), Ettel was appointed Staffelkapitän (squadron leader) of the newly created 8. Staffel of Jagdgeschwader 27 (JG 27—27th Fighter Wing), a squadron of III. Gruppe JG 27, at the time based in Tanagra, Greece. (Note: The original 8. Staffel under the command of Oberleutnant Dietrich Boesler was detached from III. Gruppe in May 1943, and was redesignated to 12. Staffel, forming the nucleus of the newly created IV. Gruppe. This decision lead to the recreation of a new 8. Staffel under the command of Ettel.) While based at Tanagra, III. Gruppe was reequipped with a full contingent of the Bf 109 G-4 and G-6 series. In June, the Gruppe familiarized themselves with the new aircraft, flying training missions. At the end of June, III. Gruppe was moved to an airfield at Argos in Peloponnese. There, the unit was tasked with flying combat air patrol mission over the Aegean Sea. The Allied invasion of Sicily resulted in the relocation of III. Gruppe to Brindisi in southern Italy on 14 July 1943.

III. Gruppe flew its first missions in support of the German ground forces southeast of Catania, Sicily on 15 July. Because of the distance to the target area, the Bf 109s had to be equipped with drop tanks. The flight engaged in aerial combat north of Mount Etna where Ettel claimed his first aerial victory in the Mediterranean Theatre over a Royal Air Force (RAF) Supermarine Spitfire fighter aircraft. The next day, he claimed another Spitfire shot down. At around noon that day, he claimed two United States Army Air Forces (USAAF) B-24 Liberator bombers shot down.

On 17 July 1943, III. Gruppe was again tasked with flying ground support missions against British forces in the vicinity of Catania. In the vicinity of Lentini, the Gruppe lost five of ten dispatched fighters to anti-aircraft fire, among them Ettel who was shot down and killed in action. His Bf 109 G-6 (Werknummer 18 402) crashed northeast of Lago di Lentini. Ettel was posthumously awarded the Knight's Cross of the Iron Cross with Oak Leaves (Ritterkreuz des Eisernen Kreuzes mit Eichenlaub) on 31 August 1943, the 289th officer or soldier of the Wehrmacht so honored. He was buried at the German cemetery at Motta Sant'Anastasia in an unmarked grave.

== Summary of career ==
=== Aerial victory claims ===
According to US historian David T. Zabecki, Ettel was credited with 124 aerial victories. Obermaier also lists Ettel with 124 victories claimed in over 250 missions. Of his 120 claims on the Eastern Front, 21 were Il-2 Sturmovik ground-attack aircraft. He claimed four victories over Sicily, which included two USAAF four-engine bombers. Spick states that Ettel had a mission-to-claim ratio of 2.02.

Mathews and Foreman, authors of Luftwaffe Aces — Biographies and Victory Claims, researched the German Federal Archives and found records for 121 aerial victory claims, plus three further unconfirmed claims. This figure of confirmed claims includes 118 aerial victories on the Eastern Front and three on the Western Front, including two four-engined bomber.

Victory claims were logged to a map-reference (PQ = Planquadrat), for example "PQ 29323". The Luftwaffe grid map (Jägermeldenetz) covered all of Europe, western Russia and North Africa and was composed of rectangles measuring 15 minutes of latitude by 30 minutes of longitude, an area of about 360 square miles (930 km^{2}). These sectors were then subdivided into 36 smaller units to give a location area 3 km × 4 km (1.9 mi × 2.5 mi) in size.

Chronicle of aerial victories
This and the ♠ (Ace of spades) indicates those aerial victories which made Ettel an "ace-in-a-day", a term which designates a fighter pilot who has shot down five or more airplanes in a single day. This and the – (dash) indicates unconfirmed aerial victory claims for which Ettel did not receive credit. This and the ? (question mark) indicates information discrepancies listed by Prien, Stemmer, Rodeike, Bock, Mathews and Foreman.
| Claim | Date | Time | Type | Location | Claim | Date | Time | Type | Location |
– 4. Staffel of Jagdgeschwader 3 "Udet" – Eastern Front — 26 April 1942 – 3 February 1943
| 1 | 24 June 1942 | 14:13 | Il-2 | | 18 | 7 August 1942 | 17:47 | LaGG-3 | 3 km (1.9 mi) east of Klischewskij |
| 2 | 24 June 1942 | 14:17 | Il-2 | | 19 | 9 August 1942 | 05:26 | Il-2 | Kalach |
| 3 | 28 June 1942 | 16:07 | Il-2 | | 20 | 9 August 1942 | 05:35 | Il-2 | 20 km (12 mi) east of Kalach; 15 km (9.3 mi) west of Pitomnik |
| 4 | 30 June 1942 | 12:45 | Yak-1 | | 21 | 19 August 1942 | 04:58 | MiG-1 | 5 km (3.1 mi) northeast of Ssadki |
| 5 | 9 July 1942 | 13:18 | Yak-1 | | 22 | 21 August 1942 | 13:35 | I-180 (Yak-7) | 2 km (1.2 mi) northeast of Businowka; 40 km (25 mi) south of Pitomnik |
| 6 | 9 July 1942 | 13:30 | Il-2 | | 23 | 13 September 1942 | 06:55 | LaGG-3 | 6 km (3.7 mi) east of Rzhev |
| 7? (Note: This claim is listed as number 13 by Mathews and Foreman.) | 10 July 1942 | 04:30 | Boston | 15 km (9.3 mi) north of Voronezh | 24 | 13 September 1942 | 07:10 | Yak-1 | 5 km (3.1 mi) southwest of Zubtsov south of Michailowka |
| 8 | 24 July 1942 | 06:16 | Hurricane | 18 km (11 mi) north-northeast of Oblivskaya | 25 | 15 September 1942 | 09:13 | Il-2 | 10 km (6.2 mi) southeast of Zubtsov south of Michailowka |
| 9 | 24 July 1942 | 13:25 | Il-2 | 5 km (3.1 mi) north of Mukownin | 26 | 15 September 1942 | 09:16 | Il-2 | 20 km (12 mi) northeast of Rzhev |
| 10 | 24 July 1942 | 13:31 | Il-2 | 15 km (9.3 mi) southwest of Ssirotinskaja | 27 | 23 September 1942 | 07:08 | LaGG-3 | 5 km (3.1 mi) east of Torshok |
| 11 | 26 July 1942 | 03:55 | LaGG-3 | 10 km (6.2 mi) east of Kalach | 28 | 23 September 1942 | 07:15 | MiG-1 | 20 km (12 mi) orthwest of Stariza |
| 12 | 26 July 1942 | 08:15 | Il-2 | Morosowskij | 29 | 7 October 1942 | 15:58 | LaGG-3 | 2 km (1.2 mi) east of Soroga |
| 13 | 26 July 1942 | 08:17 | Il-2 | Kalach | 30 | 7 October 1942 | 16:00 | LaGG-3 | 5 km (3.1 mi) south of Ostashkov |
| 14 | 28 July 1942 | 09:40 | U-2 | PQ 29323 | 31 | 31 October 1942 | 16:00 | Il-2 | Pressljanka; 25 km (16 mi) southeast of Tazinskaja |
| 15 | 28 July 1942 | 09:48 | MiG-1 | 12 km (7.5 mi) east of Tschernomarow; 15 km (9.3 mi) west of Shutow | — | 31 October 1942 | 16:40 | LaGG-3 | |
| 16 | 30 July 1942 | 07:10 | MiG-1 | 18 km (11 mi) east-northeast of Kalach; 40 km (25 mi) northwest of Kalach | 32 | 31 October 1942 | 16:50 | Il-2 | 20 km (12 mi) east of airfield Ulgy |
| 17 | 5 August 1942 | 04:37 | LaGG-3 | 7 km (4.3 mi) north of Plodowitoje | | | | | |
– 4. Staffel of Jagdgeschwader 3 "Udet" – Eastern Front — 4 February – 31 December 1943
| 33 | 12 February 1943 | 14:10 | La-5 | PQ 34 Ost 79232, 5 km (3.1 mi) east of Liman | 77 | 17 April 1943 | 11:30 | LaGG-3 | PQ 34 Ost 75424, 3 km (1.9 mi) southeast of Novorossiysk |
| 34 | 13 February 1943 | 15:30 | La-5 | PQ 34 Ost 79132, 3 km (1.9 mi) southwest of Golaja-Dolina; 20 km (12 mi) northwest of Slavansk | 78 | 17 April 1943 | 11:35 | LaGG-3 | PQ 34 Ost 75432, 15 km (9.3 mi) southeast of Novorossiysk |
| 35 | 22 February 1943 | 13:35 | LaGG-3 | PQ 34 Ost 88661, 2 km (1.2 mi) southwast of Pokrovskoye; 15 km (9.3 mi) north of Taganrog | 79? (Note: Prien, Stemmer, Rodeike and Bock consider this claim confirmed. Mathews and Foreman list this claim as unconfirmed.) | 17 April 1943 | 11:43 | LaGG-3 | PQ 34 Ost 85343, 10 km (6.2 mi) northwest of Gelendzhik |
| 36 | 5 March 1943 | 09:00 | U-2 | PQ 34 Ost 98334, vicinity of Platowo; 45 km (28 mi) north-northeast of Sinjawka | 80 | 18 April 1943 | 10:05 | I-16 | PQ 34 Ost 75462, 5 km (3.1 mi) south of Kabardinka vicinity of Leprasorium |
| 37 | 9 March 1943 | 08:30 | La-5 | PQ 34 Ost 88463, 3 km (1.9 mi) north of Matwejewkurgan; 25 km (16 mi) south-southeast of Jalisawehnino | 81 | 18 April 1943 | 18:50? (Note: According to Mathews and Foreman claimed at 18:00.) | LaGG-3 | PQ 34 Ost 7545, 5 km (3.1 mi) south of Novorossiysk vicinity of Kabardinka |
| 38 | 9 March 1943 | 15:35 | LaGG-3 | PQ 34 Ost 98523, 2 km (1.2 mi) southwest of Nowo-Strojenka; 15 km (9.3 mi) north of Sinjawka | 82 | 22 April 1943 | 14:01 | LaGG-3 | PQ 34 Ost 7546, 5 km (3.1 mi) south of Novorossiysk; Black Sea, 15 km (9.3 mi) southwest of Kabardinka |
| 39 | 12 March 1943 | 06:50 | Il-2 | PQ 34 Ost 70323, 2 km (1.2 mi) east of the Bulazelowka train station 20 km (12 mi) west of Kupiansk | 83 | 22 April 1943 | 14:08 | LaGG-3 | PQ 34 Ost 7546, 8 km (5.0 mi) southeast of Novorossiysk vicinity of Novorossiysk |
| 40 | 13 March 1943 | 06:20 | Il-2 | PQ 35 Ost 70761, 15 km (9.3 mi) east of Sswjatogorskaja; 15 km (9.3 mi) southeast of Izium | 84 | 22 April 1943 | 14:11 | LaGG-3 | PQ 34 Ost 7546, 7 km (4.3 mi) southeast of Novorossiysk |
| 41 | 13 March 1943 | 06:25 | Il-2 | PQ 35 Ost 70841, 5 km (3.1 mi) west of Nowossjolowka; 25 km (16 mi) north-northeast of Krasnyi Lyman | 85 | 22 April 1943 | 14:20 | LaGG-3 | PQ 34 Ost 85143, 6 km (3.7 mi) southeast of Krymskaja |
| 42 | 16 March 1943 | 14:25 | LaGG-3 | PQ 35 Ost 70423, 10 km (6.2 mi) southeast of Kupiansk; 15 km (9.3 mi) east of Kupiansk | 86 | 23 April 1943 | 05:30 | U-2 | PQ 34 Ost 7545, southern edge of Novorossiysk vicinity of Novorossiysk |
| 43 | 17 March 1943 | 10:50 | Boston | PQ 35 Ost 70463, 2 km (1.2 mi) west of Tabajewka; 25 km (16 mi) east-southeast of Kupiansk | 87 | 23 April 1943 | 17:02 | LaGG-3 | PQ 34 Ost 7543, 4 km (2.5 mi) east of Novorossiysk vicinity of Novorossiysk |
| 44 | 18 March 1943 | 15:05 | LaGG-3 | PQ 35 Ost 61853, 2 km (1.2 mi) northeast of Repokrytaja; 20 km (12 mi) south-southwest of Vovchansk | 88 | 23 April 1943 | 17:07 | LaGG-3 | PQ 34 Ost 7546, 5 km (3.1 mi) southeast of Novorossiysk vicinity of Novorossiysk |
| 45 | 19 March 1943 | 06:15 | LaGG-3 | PQ 35 OSt 71761, 10 km (6.2 mi) east of Olchowatka; 15 km (9.3 mi) east-southeast of Bely Kolodez | 89 | 23 April 1943 | 17:10 | LaGG-3 | PQ 34 Ost 7546, 5 km (3.1 mi) southeast of Novorossiysk vicinity of Novorossiysk |
| 46 | 19 March 1943 | 06:45 | LaGG-3 | PQ 35 Ost 71724, east of Prikolnotoje train station 10 km (6.2 mi) east of Bely Kolodez | 90 | 24 April 1943 | 05:36 | I-16 | PQ 34 Ost 85142, 3 km (1.9 mi) west of Abinskaja west of Abinsk |
| 47 | 19 March 1943 | 14:15 | LaGG-3 | PQ 35 Ost 61873, 10 km (6.2 mi) southeast of Nepokrytaja; 25 km (16 mi) east-northeast of Kharkov | 91 | 24 April 1943 | 05:37 | I-16 | PQ 34 Ost 85142, 3 km (1.9 mi) west of Abinskaja west of Abinsk |
| 48 | 19 March 1943 | 14:27 | I-180 (Yak-7) | PQ 35 Ost 60221, western edge of Bolshaja Babka; 20 km (12 mi) northeast of Malinovka | 92 | 24 April 1943 | 05:42 | I-16 | PQ 34 Ost 85149, 3 km (1.9 mi) west of Achtyrskaja; Abinsk - Achtyrskaja |
| 49 | 20 March 1943 | 08:43 | La-5 | PQ 34 Ost 98833, 5 km (3.1 mi) south of Rostov-on-Don; 15 km (9.3 mi) east of Rostov-on-Don | 93 | 26 April 1943 | 12:19 | La-5 | PQ 34 Ost 95113, 10 km (6.2 mi) southeast of Krasnodar |
| 50 | 20 March 1943 | 15:05 | LaGG-3 | PQ 35 Ost 80693, western edge of Starobilsk | 94 | 26 April 1943 | 17:05 | La-5 | PQ 34 Ost 95173, 3 km (1.9 mi) east of Kalushskaja southwest of Abinsk |
| 51 | 21 March 1943 | 14:57 | LaGG-3 | PQ 34 Ost 98812, 3 km (1.9 mi) west of Rostov-on-Don; 10 km (6.2 mi) west of Rostov-on-Don | 95 | 26 April 1943 | 17:20 | La-5 | PQ 34 Ost 85231, 5 km (3.1 mi) west of Krasnodar vicinity of Tochtamukaj |
| 52 | 21 March 1943 | 15:00 | LaGG-3 | PQ 34 Ost 98734, 5 km (3.1 mi) north of Asov; 10 km (6.2 mi) north of Asov | 96 | 28 April 1943 | 12:25 | LaGG-3 | PQ 34 Ost 8511, 6 km (3.7 mi) northwest of Abinskaja vicinity west of Abinsk |
| 53 | 25 March 1943 | 07:49 | LaGG-3 | PQ 34 Ost 88264, 2 km (1.2 mi) northeast of Kubyshewo vicinity of Jalisawehino | 97 | 28 April 1943 | 12:35 | LaGG-3 | PQ 34 Ost 8511, 3 km (1.9 mi) east of Krymskaja vicinity of Mertschskaja |
| 54 | 25 March 1943 | 07:50 | Il-2 | PQ 34 Ost 88264, 2 km (1.2 mi) northeast of Kubyshewo vicinity of Jalisawehino | 98 | 28 April 1943 | 12:40 | LaGG-3 | PQ 34 Ost 8511, 6 km (3.7 mi) east of Krymskaja vicinity of Mertschskaja |
| 55 | 25 March 1943 | 13:30 | La-5 | PQ 34 Ost 98842, 10 km (6.2 mi) southwest of Bataysk; 15 km (9.3 mi) east of Asov | 99 | 28 April 1943 | 12:42 | LaGG-3 | PQ 34 Ost 8677, 12 km (7.5 mi) northeast of Krymskaja vicinity of Mertschskaja |
| 56 | 25 March 1943 | 13:55 | LaGG-3 | PQ 34 Ost 98841, 10 km (6.2 mi) west of Bataysk; 15 km (9.3 mi) east of Asov | 100 | 6 May 1943 | 13:30 | LaGG-3 | PQ 35 Ost 71863, 5 km (3.1 mi) west of Dolgoje; 20 km (12 mi) west of Urazovo |
| 57 | 26 March 1943 | 07:52 | LaGG-3 | PQ 34 Ost 98672, 2 km (1.2 mi) west of airfield Rostov-on-Don; 15 km (9.3 mi) northwest of Rostov | 101 | 6 May 1943 | 13:35 | LaGG-3 | PQ 35 Ost 71864, 15 km (9.3 mi) southwest of Valuyki; 20 km (12 mi) west of Urazovo |
| 58 | 27 March 1943 | 11:15 | I-16 | PQ 34 Ost 98842, 6 km (3.7 mi) west of Bataysk; 15 km (9.3 mi) east of Asov | 102 | 6 May 1943 | 13:37 | Yak-1 | PQ 35 Ost 81741, 10 km (6.2 mi) southwest of Valuyki; 15 km (9.3 mi) west of Aleksejevka |
| 59 | 27 March 1943 | 11:20 | I-16 | PQ 34 Ost 98813, 15 km (9.3 mi) west of Rostov-on-Don; 10 km (6.2 mi) west of Asov | 103 | 6 May 1943 | 14:00 | Yak-1 | PQ 35 Ost 71851, 15 km (9.3 mi) south-southeast of Olchowatka; 25 km (16 mi) west of Urazovo |
| 60 | 27 March 1943 | 11:30 | LaGG-3 | PQ 34 Ost 98673, 10 km (6.2 mi) west of Rostov-on-Don; 15 km (9.3 mi) northwest of Rostov | 104 | 7 May 1943 | 18:35 | Yak-1 | PQ 34 Ost 75262, 5 km (3.1 mi) south of Krymskaja vicinity of Krymsk |
| 61 | 28 March 1943 | 10:35 | I-180 (Yak-7) | PQ 35 Ost 71782, 10 km (6.2 mi) southeast of Bolschoje-Burluk; 20 km (12 mi) south-southeast of Bely Kolodez | 105 | 8 May 1943 | 11:51 | Il-2 | PQ 34 Ost 75233, 6 km (3.7 mi) west of Krymskaja vicinity of Krymsk |
| 62 | 28 March 1943 | 13:12 | LaGG-3 | PQ 35 Ost 81714, 5 km (3.1 mi) southwest of Valuyki vicinity of Valuyki | 106 | 8 May 1943 | 11:52 | Il-2 | PQ 34 Ost 75234, 2 km (1.2 mi) west of Krymskaja vicinity of Krymsk |
| 63 | 28 March 1943 | 13:15 | Yak-7 | PQ 35 Ost 81713, 20 km (12 mi) west of Valuyki vicinity of Valuyki | 107 | 8 May 1943 | 12:05 | LaGG-3 | PQ 34 Ost 75231, 6 km (3.7 mi) south of Kijewskoje vicinity of Krymsk |
| 64 | 2 April 1943 | 06:42 | La-5 | PQ 34 Ost 98371, 15 km (9.3 mi) east of Matwejewkurgan; 25 km (16 mi) north of Sinjawka | 108 | 8 May 1943 | 12:09 | LaGG-3 | PQ 34 Ost 75263, 10 km (6.2 mi) southwest of Krymskaja vicinity of Krymsk |
| 65♠ | 11 April 1943 | 09:35 | P-39 | PQ 34 Ost 85322, 15 km (9.3 mi) northeast of Gelendzhik vicinity of Erwanskaja | 109 | 9 May 1943 | 08:35 | Boston | PQ 34 Ost 75294, 15 km (9.3 mi) east-southeast of Novorossiysk; 15 km (9.3 mi) southwest of Krymsk |
| 66♠ | 11 April 1943 | 09:37 | P-39 | PQ 85321, 20 km (12 mi) northeast of Gelendzhik vicinity of Erwanskaja | 110 | 9 May 1943 | 18:07 | LaGG-3 | PQ 34 Ost 75234, southern edge of Krymskaja vicinity of Krymsk |
| 67♠ | 11 April 1943 | 09:40 | P-39 | PQ 34 Ost 85122, 5 km (3.1 mi) southwest of Mingrelskaja vicinity of Erwanskaja | 111 | 9 May 1943 | 18:15 | LaGG-3 | PQ 34 Ost 75234, easternern edge of Krymskaja vicinity of Krymsk |
| 68♠ | 11 April 1943 | 13:55 | Il-2 | PQ 34 Ost 75184, 15 km (9.3 mi) south of Anapa over sea | 112♠ | 10 May 1943 | 09:40 | LaGG-3 | PQ 34 Ost 76831, northeastern edge of Anatassijewskaja; 20 km (12 mi) west of Slavyanskaya |
| 69♠ | 11 April 1943 | 14:05 | LaGG-3 | PQ 34 Ost 75392, 30 km (19 mi) southwest of Novorossiysk; Black Sea, 40 km (25 mi) southwest of Novorossiysk | 113♠ | 10 May 1943 | 15:35 | LaGG-3 | PQ 34 Ost 85173, 12 km (7.5 mi) southwest of Abinskaja southwest of Abinsk |
| 70 | 12 April 1943 | 10:25 | P-39 | PQ 34 Ost 86853, 3 km (1.9 mi) east of Marjanskaja east of Marianskaja | 114♠ | 10 May 1943 | 15:35 | LaGG-3 | PQ 34 Ost 85171, 9 km (5.6 mi) southwest of Abinskaja southwest of Abinsk |
| 71 | 12 April 1943 | 10:35 | P-40 | PQ 34 Ost 86592, 5 km (3.1 mi) south of Iwanowskaja vicinity of Iwanowskaja | 115♠ | 10 May 1943 | 15:37 | LaGG-3 | PQ 34 Ost 85144, 2 km (1.2 mi) southeast of Abinskaja southwest of Abinsk |
| 72 | 15 April 1943 | 15:30 | P-39 | PQ 34 Ost 86892, northern edge of Krasnodar vicinity of Marianskaja | 116♠ | 10 May 1943 | 15:50 | Yak-1 | PQ 34 Ost 85123, 9 km (5.6 mi) northeast of Abinskaja vicinity of Sswobodnyj |
| 73 | 15 April 1943 | 16:12 | LaGG-3 | PQ 34 Ost 85344, 15 km (9.3 mi) northeast of Gelendzhik vicinity of Leprasorium | 117♠ | 10 May 1943 | 15:55 | Yak-1 | PQ 34 Ost 85114, 12 km (7.5 mi) east of Krymskaja vicinity of Mertschskaja |
| 74 | 15 April 1943 | 16:15 | LaGG-3 | PQ 34 Ost 85343, 8 km (5.0 mi) northwest of Gelendzhik vicinity of Leprasorium | 118 | 11 May 1943 | 16:35 | LaGG-3 | PQ 34 Ost 86721, 6 km (3.7 mi) southeast of Slavyansk-na-Kubani southeast of Slavyansk-na-Kubani |
| 75 | 16 April 1943 | 14:47 | P-40 | PQ 34 Ost 85114, 10 km (6.2 mi) east of Krymskaja | 119 | 11 May 1943 | 16:37 | LaGG-3 | PQ 34 Ost 86712, 3 km (1.9 mi) south of Slavyansk-na-Kubani vicinity of Slavyansk-na-Kubani |
| 76 | 16 April 1943 | 14:55 | P-39 | PQ 34 Ost 85782, 10 km (6.2 mi) west of Mingrelskaja | | | | | |
– 8. Staffel of Jagdgeschwader 27 – Mediterranean Theatre — July 1943
| 120 | 15 July 1943 | 12:12 | Spitfire | southeast of Noto | 122 | 16 July 1943 | 12:50 | B-24 | 40 km (25 mi) southeast of Potenza |
| 121 | 16 July 1943 | 08:10 | Spitfire? (Note: According to Mathews and Foreman claimed as a Consolidated B-24 Liberator.) | 15 km (9.3 mi) north of Augusta | — | 16 July 1943 | 12:55 | B-24 | southwest of Bari |

=== Awards ===
- Iron Cross (1939)
  - 2nd Class (24 July 1942)
  - 1st Class (2 August 1942)
- Front Flying Clasp of the Luftwaffe in Gold (23 October 1942)
- Honour Goblet of the Luftwaffe on 25 June 1943 as Leutnant and pilot
- German Cross in Gold on 23 December 1942 as Leutnant in the 4./Jagdgeschwader 3
- Knight's Cross of the Iron Cross with Oak Leaves
  - Knight's Cross on 1 June 1943 as Leutnant and Staffelführer of the 4./Jagdgeschwader 3 "Udet" (Note: According to Scherzer as pilot and not Staffelführer in the 4./Jagdgeschwader 3 "Udet")
  - 289th Oak Leaves on 31 August 1943 (posthumously) as Oberleutnant and Staffelkapitän of the 8./Jagdgeschwader 27
