= 1669 eruption of Mount Etna =

Volcanic eruption in Sicily, Italy

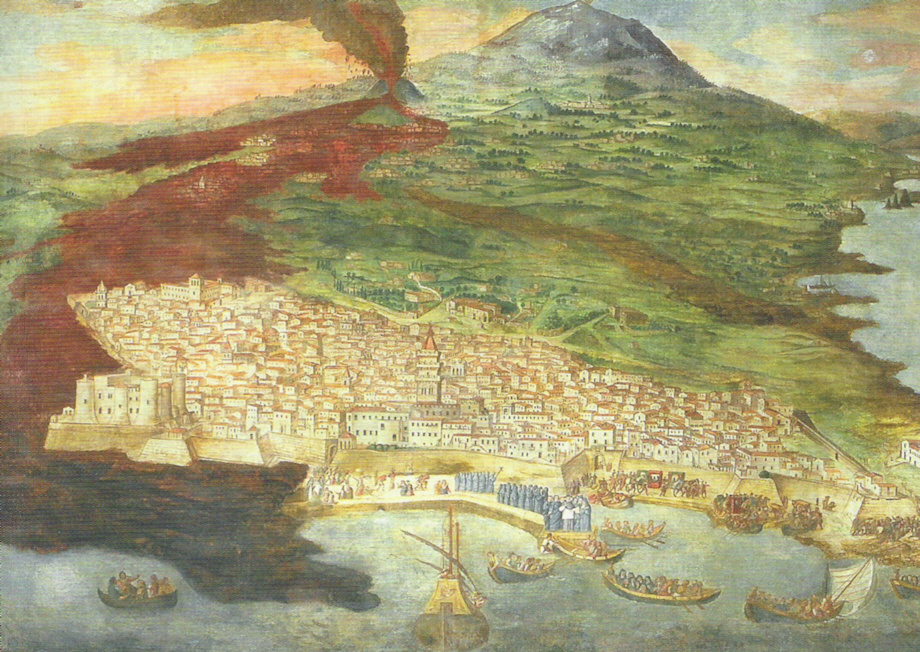
- Fresco by Giacinto Platania depicting the 1669 eruption
- Volcano: Mount Etna
- Start date: 11 March 1669
- End date: 15 July 1669
- Type: Effusive eruption
- Location: Southern flank of Mount Etna, Sicily, Italy
- VEI: 2–3

The 1669 eruption of Mount Etna is the largest-recorded historical eruption of that volcano on the east coast of Sicily, Italy. After several weeks of increasing seismic activity that damaged the town of Nicolosi and other settlements, an eruption fissure opened on the southeastern flank of Etna during the night of 10–11 March. Several more fissures became active during 11 March, erupting pyroclastics and tephra that fell over Sicily and accumulated to form the Monti Rossi scoria cone.

Lava disgorged from the eruption fissures and flowed southwards away from the vent, burying farmland and a number of towns during March and April, eventually covering 37–40 square kilometres (14–15 sq mi). The inhabitants of the towns fled to the city of Catania and sought refuge there; religious ceremonies were held in the city to implore the end of the eruption. In early April a branch of the lava flow advanced towards the city, and on the 1 or 16 April it reached the city walls, provoking the flight of many of its inhabitants. The city walls held up the lava, which began to flow into the Ionian Sea. More than two weeks later, parts of the flow surmounted the walls and penetrated Catania but did not cause much damage. The eruption ended in July.

The first recorded attempt to divert a lava flow occurred when priest Diego Pappalardo and fifty others worked to break up a lava flow in an effort to divert it. The effort was initially successful, but the diverted flow threatened another town, whose inhabitants chased Pappalardo and his men away; and the lava flow resumed its original course towards Catania. There are no known fatalities of the 1669 eruption, but much farmland and many towns were destroyed by the lava flow and the earthquakes that accompanied the eruption. News of the eruption spread as far as North America, and a number of contemporaries described the event; this led to an increased interest in Etna's volcanic activity.

== Context ==
Mount Etna lies on the east coast of the island of Sicily, facing the Ionian Sea. Etna is one of the most iconic and active volcanoes in the world; its eruptions – including both effusive and explosive eruptions from flank and central vents – have been recorded for 2,700 years. Etna had been unusually active during the 17th century, with several long-lasting and voluminous eruptions, and volcanic activity also increased on Vulcanello in the Aeolian Islands; a similar concordance between activity at Etna and in the Aeolian Islands was also observed in 2002. During the two months before the 1669 eruption, the output of gas and steam from Etna's summit craters had been higher than usual.

In 1669, Sicily was part of the Kingdom of Aragon, which governed the island through a viceroy in Palermo. A highly productive agricultural sector existed on the heavily urbanized southeastern slopes of Etna; settlements had grown there during the High Middle Ages. Catania had a population of about 27,000 and was the third-largest city of the Kingdom of Naples and Sicily.

== Events ==
=== Prelude ===
Seismic activity at Mount Etna began on 25 February 1669 and increased over the next two weeks. It reached its peak during the night of 10 and 11 March when earthquakes destroyed Nicolosi. The seismic activity caused damage in Gravina, Mascalucia, Pedara and Trecastagni, and was felt as far away as Catania. A number of seismic events are reported in contemporaneous records but their timing and frequency are not known. Early activity that lasted until 9 March reflects the ascent of deep magma within the mountain while subsequent earthquakes were associated with the opening of the eruption fissure. These early events impacted a wider area than the later ones; earthquake activity diminished after the eruption had begun.

=== Eruption commences and events at the vent ===
After midnight on 11 March, the first fissure opened up on Etna between the Monte Frumento Supino cinder cone and Piano San Leo. This 2-meter (6.6 ft) wide and 9-kilometer (5.6-mile) long fissure between 2,800–1,200 m (9,200–3,900 ft) elevation was accompanied by weak eruptive activity at its upper end and an intense glow on its lower end. During the afternoon of the same day, a second fissure opened and erupted lithics and ash clouds; historical records vary on the number of vents that became active. An alternative reconstruction of events envisages the development of several fissure segments between 950–700 m (3,120–2,300 ft) elevation, most of which underwent brief explosive and effusive eruptions. At 18:30, the main vent became active and lava began to flow from the second fissure from east of the Monte Salazara cone, close to Nicolosi, at 800–850 m (2,620–2,790 ft) elevation in Etna's southern rift zone.

A fifth fissure segment south of the Monpilieri cinder cone was briefly active on 12 March and several vents – sources disagree on the exact number – became active on 12 March around the main vent with lava fountaining. The Monti Rossi cinder cone developed over the main vent and was almost fully formed by 13 March.

=== Explosive eruption ===
An eruption column rose from the vent and deposited tephra, pyroclastics covered large parts of Etna's southeastern flank and ash from the eruption traveled as far as Calabria and Greece. Strombolian and lava fountaining took place, generating pyroclastics including lapilli and lava bombs, which fell over the southeastern flank for three months. These deposits reached a thickness of 12 centimetres (4.7 in) 5 km (3.1 miles) from the vent; roofs in Acireale, Pedara, Trecastagni and Viagrande collapsed under the weight of the tephra. Huge boulders were ejected to distances of several kilometers. Most of the tephra was produced within the first few days of the eruption.

The explosive stages of the 1669 eruption produced 0.066 km^{3} (0.016 cu mi) of pyroclastics and have been classified as category 2–3 on the Volcanic Explosivity Index, making it one of the most intense eruptions of Etna. Subplinian eruptions on Etna's flanks are not common; other examples are the prehistoric eruptions of Monte Moio 28,600 ± 4,700 years ago, Monte Frumento delle Concazze 3,500 years ago and Monte Salto del Cane 3,000 years ago.

Over three million tons of sulfur were released by the eruption. This sulfur may have risen into the upper troposphere, causing changes in the chemistry of the regional atmosphere and environmental hazards. The 1669 eruption, however, did not form a substantial atmospheric dust veil.

=== Lava flow ===
Lava now flowed out of the volcano into a densely populated area at an average rate of 50–100 m^{3}/s (1,800–3,500 cu ft/s), with a peak rate of 640 m^{3}/s (23,000 cu ft/s). Lava emanating from the vent flowed around the Mompilieri/Monpilieri cinder cone and during 12 March destroyed the village of Malpasso. The town of Mompilieri fell victim to the lava flows during the night and Mascalucia was covered the day after. During and after 14 March, the lava flow branched out in three directions and began to advance southwards; the western branch destroyed villages close to Mascalucia, and houses around Camporotondo and San Pietro.

This fiery and burning deluge immediately spread itself to above six miles in breadth, seeming to be somewhat of the colour of melted and burning glass; but, as it cools, becomes hard and rocky, and everywhere in its passage leaves hills and pyramids of that matter behind it.

— Heneage Finch, 3rd Earl of Winchilsea, 1669,

After 15 March, the lava flow fronts began to slow down. The development of additional branches and of overlapping flows continued as lava tubes formed in the flow. On 15–17 March San Giovanni Galermo was partially destroyed, followed during the next week by agricultural land of Gravina. Between 26 and 29 March the same fate struck Camporotondo and San Pietro, and on 29 March Misterbianco. Between 18 and 25 March the western and eastern branches of the lava flow stopped advancing 10 km (6.2 miles) and 8.8 km (5.5 miles) away from the vent, respectively. Almost a century after the eruption, Sir William Hamilton reported the lava flows had shifted an otherwise undamaged vineyard by over 0.5 km (0.31 miles).

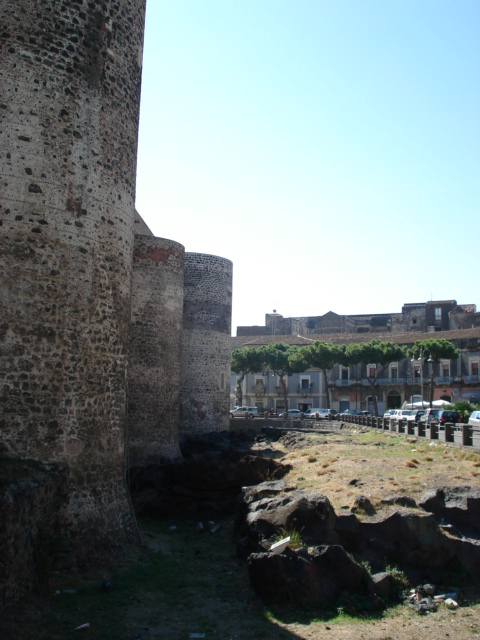
Wall of the Castello Ursino, with the 1669 lava flow on the right

The southeastern branch of the flow, which was fed by lava tubes and ephemeral vents, continued to advance and destroyed farms close to Catania. On 20 March, a branch of the lava flow approached the city and after ponding in and filling the Gurna del Nicito lake, on the 1, 12 or 16 April, it reached the city walls about 15 km (9.3 miles) away from the vent. The walls deflected the lava flow southwards and after surrounding the Castello Ursino on 23 April and obliterating the valley that surrounded it, the lava flow began entering the Ionian Sea as a 2 km (1.2-mile)-wide flow front. (Note: 1669 was the last year that lava from Etna reached the sea, earlier events had taken place during the Middle Ages c. 1030 and c. 1160 AD.)

The city walls resisted the advancing lava for 15 days. Beginning on 30 April, some flows overtopped the walls and penetrated Catania, pushing aside weaker buildings and burying sturdier ones but did not cause much damage. Inside the city the flows advanced about 200 metres (660 ft). The 1669 eruption is the only historical eruption that impacted the urban area of Catania; other lava flows in the city are of prehistoric age and the presence of lava from the AD 252 eruption has been ruled out.

Lava continued to flow into the sea, which was 17 km (11 miles) away from the vents, for two more months, and overlapping lava flows continued to form upstream yielding a complex lava field. On 11 July 1669 lava ceased to flow and on 15 July the eruption was definitively over. The eruption lasted 122 days, making it one of the longest in the history of Etna. Even after the eruption ended, the lava flows were still hot enough to boil water for many months and it reportedly took eight years for the lava to cool. (Note: In a contemporary engraving, Catanians are shown hanging clothes over the still-hot lava to dry.) Puffs of gas would escape when rods were poked into the lava.

=== Events at the summit ===
During the night of 24 March, a violent earthquake took place and was followed by activity on the main summit of Etna. The next day at 10:00 an explosive eruption occurred at the summit, and an "immensely high" eruption column rose over the volcano. No caldera collapse took place on the volcano but landslides affected the summit crater. There is disagreement between contemporaneous records that mention a collapse of the summit in 1669, those which do not, and 21st-century research that indicates there were no major changes in the morphology of the summit during the 1669 eruption.

== Response ==
When the eruption began to destroy settlements and land north of Catania, the people fled to the city. Authorities in Catania requested assistance from the then-viceroy of Sicily Francisco Fernández de la Cueva, 8th Duke of Alburquerque and took care of about 20,000 refugees. These refugees sought out the city as a safe haven because it was distant from the eruption at that time and they were received with great hospitality. It appears that during this time, religious ceremonies took up much of the daily lives of Catania's populace.

As the eruption continued and lava flows advanced towards Catania, law and order broke down, panic ensued – an unusual event during a natural disaster – and the authorities of Catania were overwhelmed. The viceroy appointed Prince Stefano Riggio as vicar-general to manage the crisis per l'incendio di Mongibello ("for the fire of the Mongibello"); Riggio arrived on 18 April and found a largely depopulated city as the artisanal class and the aristocracy had fled Catania and others had followed in their wake. Riggio prepared barracks north of Catania to take up refugees and evacuated both prisons, the city archives, food reserves and religious objects from the city. When lava broke over the city walls on 30 April, the evacuation of the city was considered but then rejected. Instead, the walls threatened by the lava flows were reinforced, gates blocked and when the lava penetrated them restraining walls and barriers were built from the debris of destroyed houses. (Note: Apparently such efforts were not made in any subsequent volcanic eruption until 1960 when similar undertakings took place in Hawaii.) The viceroy later sent also money for recovery.

Eruptions of Etna were interpreted as the consequence of divine wrath and suffering being inflicted on the sinful people. Religious services took place in Catania and other villages; during processions the relics of St. Agatha, the Martyr of Catania, were carried around and people flagellated themselves. Some sources suggest the veil of St. Agatha spared the city from total destruction.

Fifty inhabitants of Pedara led by priest Diego Pappalardo attempted to divert a lava flow by breaking up the margins with axes and picks while protecting themselves from the heat through water-soaked hides. This effort worked initially until 500 inhabitants of Paternò put a stop to it because their town was threatened by the redirected lava flow. The diversion attempt failed when the breach healed. This effort constitutes the first recorded attempt at changing the course of a lava flow. As a consequence of the incident between Paterno and the people attempting the diversion, it was declared and formally ratified in the 19th century that people diverting a lava flow would be liable for the damage caused by it; this rule was only suspended during the eruption of 1983 although clandestine attempts, sometimes with official backing, had occurred before that year. There were religious objections to diverting lava flows; such an intervention was viewed as sacrilegious in the context of the relationship between God, man, and nature.

== Impact ==
=== On the volcano ===
The 1669 eruption is considered to be the most important historical flank eruption of Etna. With a volume of 0.5–1 km^{3} (0.12–0.24 cu mi) (Note: There are various estimates of the thickness of the lava flow, and consequently volume estimates range from 0.46 km^{3} (0.11 cu mi) to 0.997 km^{3} (0.239 cu mi).) lava, the 1669 eruption is Etna's largest during the last 400 years and its largest historical effusive eruption. Its lava field is the largest in the volcano's history and the longest flow at Etna during the last 15,000 years.

The lava flow of 1669 covered an area of 37 km^{2} (14 sq mi)-40 km^{2} (15 sq mi), (Note: Later settlement and human modification has rendered the borders of the lava field unrecognizable in many parts.) radically changing the morphology of the volcano. It is considered an aa lava field that also contains "toothpaste" lava with tabular and plate-like structures of varying sizes and numerous lava channels. The lava extended the coast by 800 m (2,600 ft) over a width of 1.5 km (0.93 miles). An older volcanic cone and lava flows from earlier eruptions were partially buried.

The 1669 eruption came at the end of a period of high effusive activity that began in 1610. The behavior of Etna changed after the eruption, presumably due to the large volume of material erupted in the 1669 event and changes in the plumbing system it caused. After 1669, Etna's eruptions were smaller, shorter, and more sporadic with fewer flank eruptions, (Note: Eruptions at less than 1,000 m (3,300 ft) elevation were common during the Greco-Roman and Medieval periods but since 1669 activity has been concentrated on the middle and upper sectors of the volcano.) and mafic phenocrysts became more common in the lavas. The 1669 eruption has been defined as the starting point of a century-long cycle of activity that continues to this day and Etna's volcanic products are subdivided into pre-1669 and post-1669 formations in Italy's geological map.

==== Scoria cone and lava caves ====
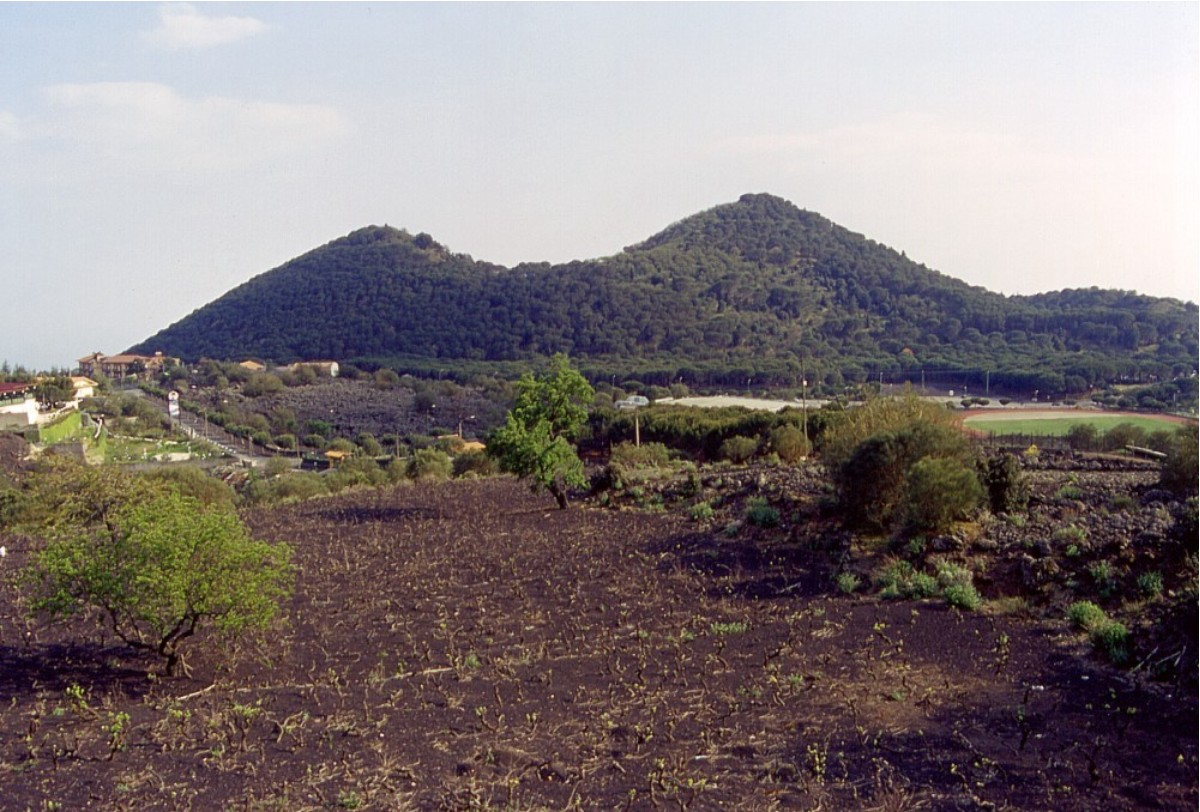
The Monti Rossi viewed from north

The about-200-metre-high (660 ft) and about 1-kilometre-wide (0.62-mile) Monti Rossi scoria cone was formed by the 1669 eruption. It consists of two overlapping cones or a cone with two summits that was constructed by intense lava bomb and volcanic ash fallout that was observed by eyewitnesses. This cone was named "Mount of Ruin" after the eruption and was then renamed Monti Rossi (Red Mountains), either to cancel the memory of the destructive eruption or after its color. It is a prominent landmark.

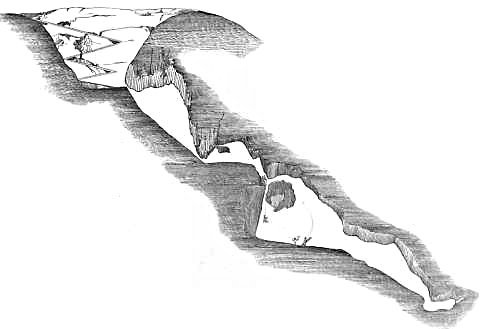
Grotta delle Palombe

Several caves, such as the Grotta delle Palombe, Pietra Luna cave, a system of three caves between Belpasso and Nicolosi that contain cave formations; and several lava caves in the flow were formed by the 1669 eruption. Such caves form when lava flows develop a crust and drain out, leaving an empty space under the crust that forms the cave. Grotta delle Palombe is accessible from a small depression in the eruption fissure.

=== On the surrounding population ===
The 1669 eruption was the most destructive eruption of Mount Etna since the Middle Ages. Approximately fourteen villages and towns (Note: Camporotondo, La Guardia, Belpasso/Malpasso, Mascalucia, Mister Bianco, Nicolosi, Monpilieri, San Pietro, San Giovanni de Gelermo and others.) were destroyed by the lava flows or by earthquakes that preceded and accompanied the eruption. (Note: In Misterbianco, the Campanarazzu belltower of the Santa Maria delle Grazie church survived the eruption but it was heavily damaged by the 1693 earthquake, and was excavated between 2001 and 2009.) South of the volcano, ash and tephra fallout destroyed large but unclearly stated quantities of olive groves, orchards, pasture, vineyards, and mulberry trees that were used for silkworm rearing. Contemporaneous sources do not mention any fatalities from the eruption or the earthquakes that accompanied it; later reports of 10,000 – 20,000 fatalities appear to be incorrect and apocryphal.

Contrary to common reports, not all of Catania was destroyed but its outskirts, (Note: Including Roman-era buildings such as the amphitheater, the hippodrome, and the naumachia where naval battles had been staged,) and the western part of the city sustained damage. Canals, (Note: Including the Amenano River that flows through Catania and was connected to these canals. It was buried underneath the lava.) parts of the fortifications of Catania, and about 730-300 buildings were destroyed by the eruption. The Monastery of San Nicolò l'Arena and the Castello Ursino were damaged; its moat was filled in and the lower part of the Castello Ursino was buried beneath 9–12 m (30–39 ft) of lava (Note: Which however did not severely damage statues and structures it buried.). Large parts of the population of Catania and 27,000 peasants were left homeless. The reconstruction costs, damages caused by the eruption, and a population decrease during the events depressed both industrial and commercial activity in the city.

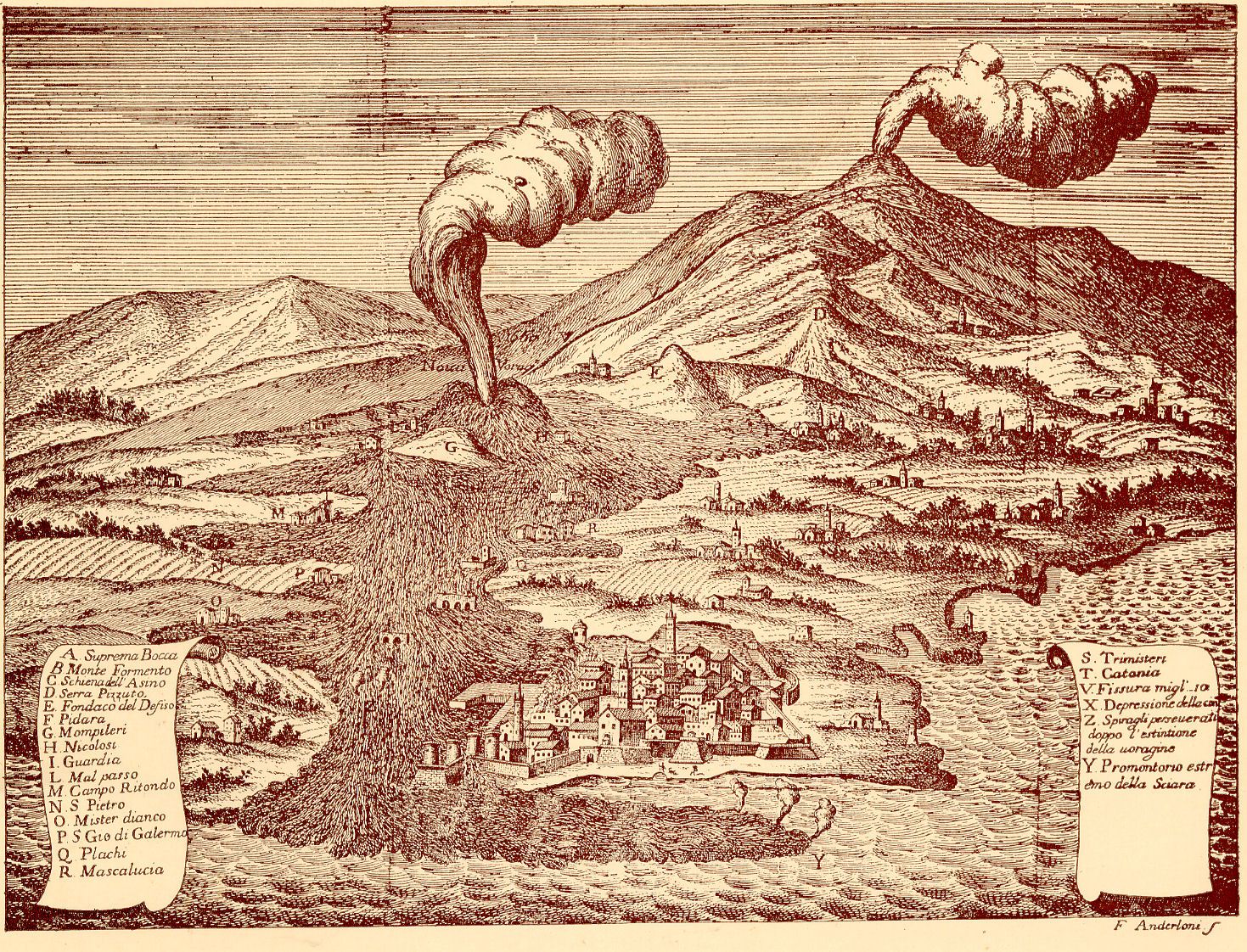
A later engraving of the eruption

The eruption is also known as the Great eruption and the year of great ruin by contemporaries. News of the eruption spread to England, France, Portugal, Ireland, and Scotland, where government news pamphlets about the eruption were published. The news reached as far as Cambridge, Massachusetts, in North America. The noted Canary Islands poet Juan Bautista Poggio y Monteverde may have drawn inspiration from the eruption. The 1669 eruption has been portrayed in a number of contemporaneous iconographic works and is the most commonly depicted eruption of Etna in its iconography. After 1669, the number of large eruptions of Etna decreased and the interest in portraying the volcano and its eruptions waned as a consequence.

=== Long-term effects ===
Despite the lack of fatalities, the 1669 eruption had a long-term impact on society and economy of the wider region. Inhabitation patterns and thus the economic development of the southeastern flank of Etna were influenced by the eruption for centuries. The population of the region declined after the eruption.

Several towns were rebuilt in different locations and under different names. A new port and a new neighborhood were built in Catania, as the already poor port was further damaged by the eruption. Its city walls were rendered ineffective by the lava flow, which provided a natural obstacle. New fortifications were built in 1676 on the lava flow and in sections that were unprotected after the eruption. In Catania, the damage caused by the eruption was exceeded by that caused by the 1693 Sicily earthquake. The historic city centre of Catania with its Baroque buildings was built after the eruption and earthquake.

Unlike earthquakes, lava flows cause long-lasting damage to land; even a century later the land covered by the lava from the 1669 eruption was barren and today only limited agricultural activity is possible. As a consequence of this and other eruptions, about 13% of cultivable land south of Etna and below 1,000 m (3,300 ft) elevation was lost in the 17th century. A westward expansion of Catania was no longer possible over the terrain covered by lava. The impact of the tephra fallout was less; roof damage was quickly repaired and agriculture quickly recovered.

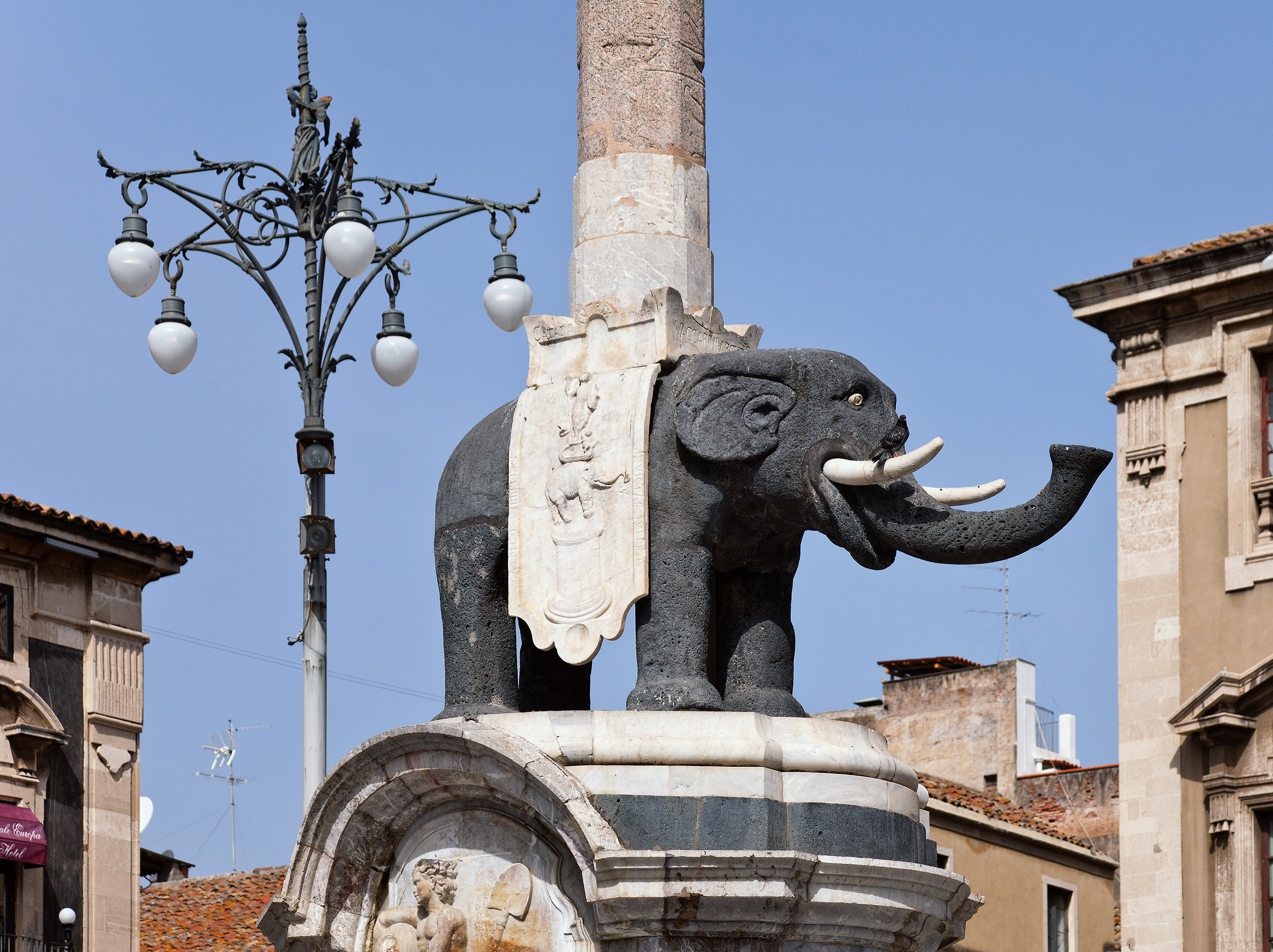
Elephant Fountain in Catania

Rocks erupted in 1669 have been quarried, especially after the 1693 earthquake when they were used during the reconstruction of the city. Lava was used to pave roads, for constructions, and later for architectural elements, the production of bituminous conglomerate, concrete, and statues such as the Fountain of the Elephant in Catania. The present-day port of Catania is attached to the 1669 lava flow. Elsewhere in Catania, the lava flow is mostly hidden. In 2022, the government of Sicily defined 11 March a day of remembrance of the 1669 eruption.

=== Impact on science ===
Mount Etna's 1669 eruption drew increased interest in the volcano's activity. During the 18th and 19th centuries, abbots and geologists compiled histories of the volcano and lists of its eruptions. Reports of eruptions at Etna became more complete and detailed. Francesco d'Arezzo melted the rocks erupted in 1669 to obtain information about their nature.

== Geology ==
The lavas erupted in 1669 define a sodic hawaiite suite (Note: The presence of mugearite has also been mentioned) with two distinct acidic and mafic members that were erupted before and after 20 March, respectively. These two magmas formed through fractional crystallization processes in different parts of Mount Etna's plumbing system. It appears that prior to the 1669 eruption, a batch of more acidic magma was residing underneath Etna. A batch of new, more mafic magma that was more buoyant than the residing magma penetrated and traversed the magmatic system, and reached the surface. Later, the more acidic magma erupted. Magma was accumulating prior to 1669 in the plumbing of Mount Etna and formed a large reservoir that supplied the voluminous eruptions of the 17th century; increased volatile content or increased magma volume might have eventually triggered the 1669 eruption.

The lava flows of 1669 contain up to 18% bubbles, a large proportion and considerably more than expected from lava flows on the surface that might explain the fluidity of the flows that maintained pahoehoe morphology 16 km (9.9 miles) from the vents. The lava also contains large phenocrysts of plagioclase, as do lavas of other eruptions of the 17th century; these lavas are called cicirara and they often appear at the end of an eruption cycle at Mount Etna.

== Research history ==
Owing to its magnitude, the eruption was well documented by contemporaries. Records range from administrative documents that were part of the crisis management and the post-crisis management over memoirs to eyewitness reports. Italian scientist Giovanni Alfonso Borelli (1608–1679) in his 1670 publication Historia et Meteorologia and the British ambassador in Constantinople Heneage Finch, 3rd Earl of Winchilsea (1628–1689) in a report to King Charles II of England (Note: titled A true and exact relation of the late prodigious earthquake and eruption of Mount Etna or Montegibello as it came in a letter written to his Majesty from Naples. Together with a more particular narrative of the same, as it is collected out of several relations sent from Catania) wrote about the eruption. Later reviews of the eruption were written by the British diplomat Sir William Hamilton (1730–1803). Borelli's history of the 1669 eruption is the oldest scientific description of Etna's volcanic activity. Anonymous reports published in 1669 include An answer to some inquiries concerning the eruptions of Mt. Aetna, 1669, communicated by some inquisitive merchants now residing in Sicily and A chronological account of several Incendiums or fires of Mt. Aetna. The large number of contemporary records makes it possible to reconstruct the course of the eruption with reasonable accuracy.

== Implications for volcanic hazards at Etna ==
The 1669 eruption represents a worst-case scenario of an effusive eruption at Etna; over 500,000 people live in Catania and a similar eruption today would cause about €7,000,000,000 damage. Apart from the lava, tephra and lapilli associated with explosive activity would damage critical infrastructure close to the vent, disrupt air travel, and impact both human health and the environment.

== See also ==
- List of Mount Etna eruptions
