= Alex Xydias =

American racing driver (1922–2024)

Alex Xydias (March 22, 1922 – August 24, 2024) was an American hot rodder, racing driver and land speed racer, active in the early days of auto racing.

== Biography ==
Xydias was born in Los Angeles. He served in World War II as radio operator and engineer on a Boeing B-17 Flying Fortress.

In 1946, immediately after Xydias was discharged from the United States Army Air Corps, he opened the So-Cal Speed Shop in Burbank, one of the first hot rod speed shops in Southern California. In 1950, he drove the first streamliner (made, with help from ÀDean Batchelor, from a drop tank) powered by a Flathead Ford V-8 60. The Xydias-Batchlor tank, named the So-Cal Streamliner (wearing #5), would earn them SCTA's first Hot Rod Trophy (for top speed of the meet) at the 1949 Bonneville Nationals, with a speed of 193.54 mph (311.47 km/h), and put them on the cover of Hot Rod in October that year. It would be the first flatty-powered tank to exceed 200 mph (322 km/h), thanks in part to running 40 percent nitro.

Xydias was the founder of the Alex Xydias & Pete Chapouris Center for the Automotive Arts at the Pomona Fairplex which offers a two-year program in the automotive arts. He was also a member of the board of directors of the Wally Parks NHRA Motorsports Museum.

Xydias turned 100 in March 2022, and died in Southern California on August 24, 2024, at the age of 102.
