= Malliga =

Malliga may refer to:

- Malliga 1, a 1960s Austrian human-powered aircraft
- Malliga 2, a 1970s Austrian human-powered aircraft
- Malliga MAL 04 Speedbird, a 2010s Austrian high-speed aircraft
