= Camporotondo =

Camporotondo may refer to:

- Camporotondo Etneo, municipality in the Metropolitan City of Catania in the Italian region Sicily, Italy
- Camporotondo di Fiastrone, municipality in the Province of Macerata in the Italian region Marche, Italy
