= Xydias =

Xydias is a surname. Notable people with the surname include:

- Alex Xydias (1922–2024), American racecar driver
- Anthony J. Xydias (1882–1952), American film producer
