= Lakester =

Typology of a Competition Vehicle

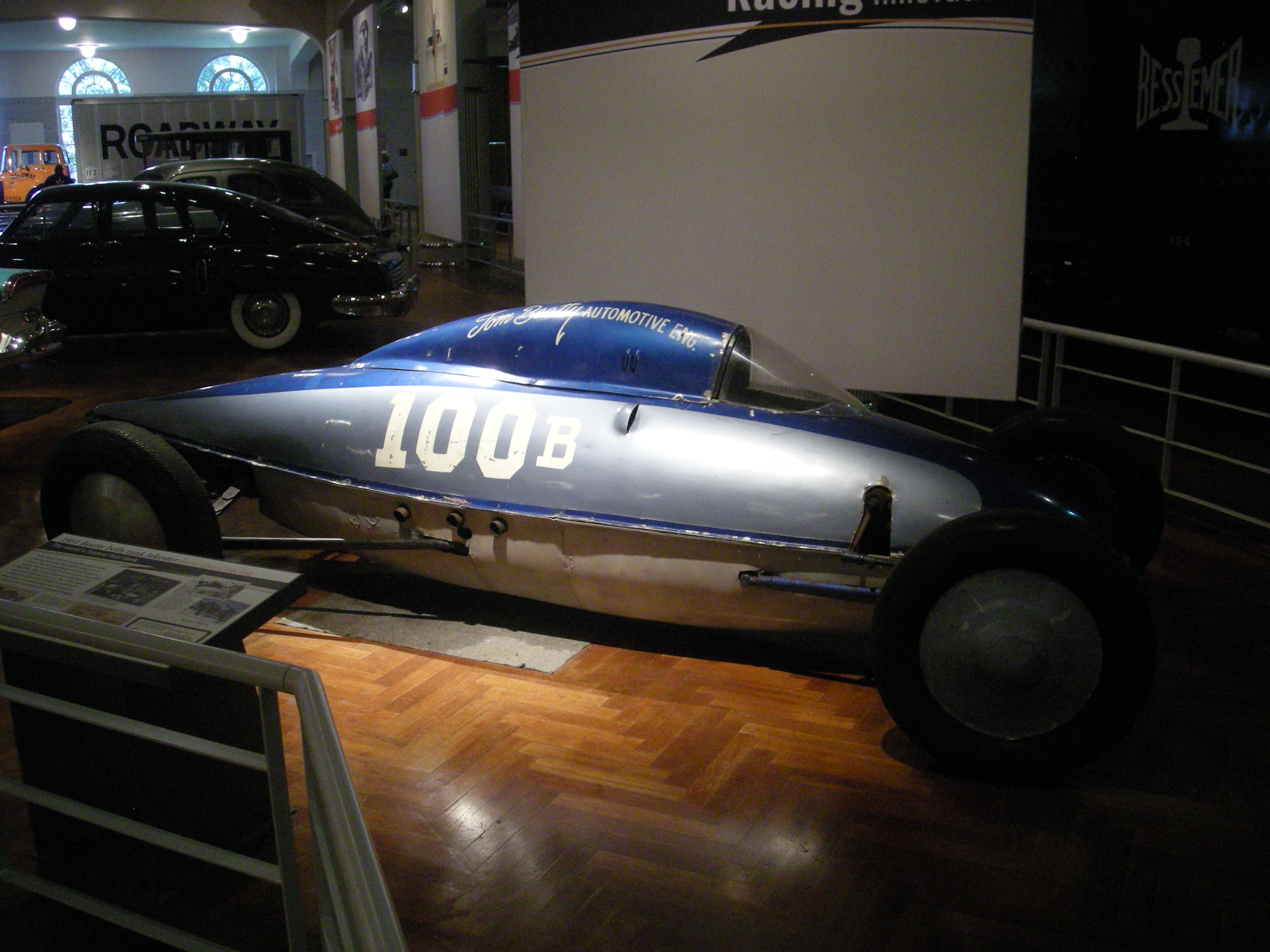
An example of a lakester, this one at the Henry Ford Museum

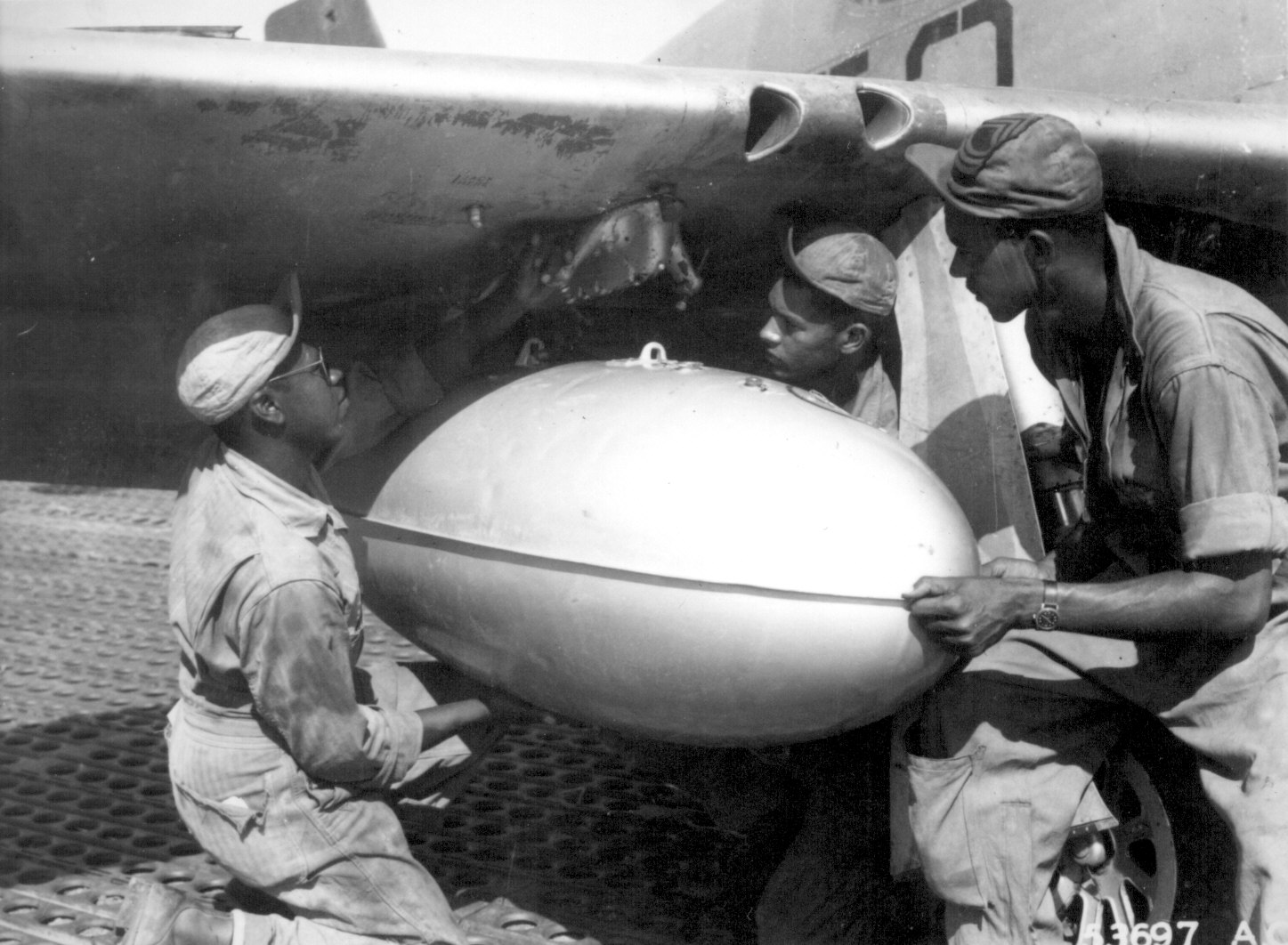
An example of a drop tank on a P-51, though it is a 75-gallon tank, and mounted on a wing hardpoint.

A Lakester is a car with a streamlined body but with four exposed wheels. It is most often made out of a modified aircraft drop tank. The main attraction is the drop tank's excellent aerodynamics due to it being streamlined for its original use on aircraft. Building lakesters became popular after World War II when surplus drop tanks were available cheaply.

== History ==
During the late 1940s Bill Burke of the So-Cal Speed Shop built the first "Lakester" from a surplus aircraft drop tank. The idea of using a tank as an aerodynamic car body came to Burke when he saw some drop tanks on a barge being taken ashore at Guadalcanal. Burke recalls thinking, "My god, what a beautiful piece of streamlining that is!" With a tape measure, Burke went aboard and measured one of the tanks. He knew the dimensions of a Ford rear end and engine block, and he could see that the automotive components would fit.

== Production ==
After World War II, surplus tanks were sold for $35 or $40 apiece, and hundreds of them were stockpiled in surplus yards. Burke's first Lakester was created from a 168-gallon tank used on the P-51 Mustang. However, with experience it was found that the 315-gallon tank used on the P-38 Lightning was more practical due to its greater size. The tanks consisted of two halves bolted together, however since the top half had fuel openings and all the necessary hardware to fasten it to the aircraft, usually only two bottom halves were used to create a Lakester.

== Racing ==
The Lakester's first race appearance was at Bonneville Salt Flats, which is where the vehicle gets its name (e.g., from Great Salt Lake). Even today, Lakesters can still be seen racing there.

== See also ==
- Drop tank
- So-Cal Speed Shop
