= Santa Maria del Rosario, Motta Sant'Anastasia =

Church building in Motta Sant'Anastasia, Italy

Coordinates: 37.°N 14.°E

Santa Maria del Rosario, also called the Chiesa Madre ('Mother Church'), is the main Roman Catholic church building in the town of Motta Sant'Anastasia, province of Catania, Sicily.

== History ==
A church was built at the site by the 13th-century, arising adjacent to the Norman castle, and built also tall with similar stone blocks. The original layout was centralized, but the church was enlarged in the 15th and 16th centuries leading to the Latin Cross layout it has present. The bell-tower was only added in the 18th-century. It was dedicated to the Maria Santissima del Rosario or Holiest Mary of the Rosary, an altarpiece in this church dedicated to this Marian devotion attributed to the school of Antonello da Messina. There is also a crucifix and painting of the Madonna del Carmelo from the 16th century.
