= Misterbianco =

Misterbianco Mustariancu (Sicilian)
- Comune
- Comune di Misterbianco
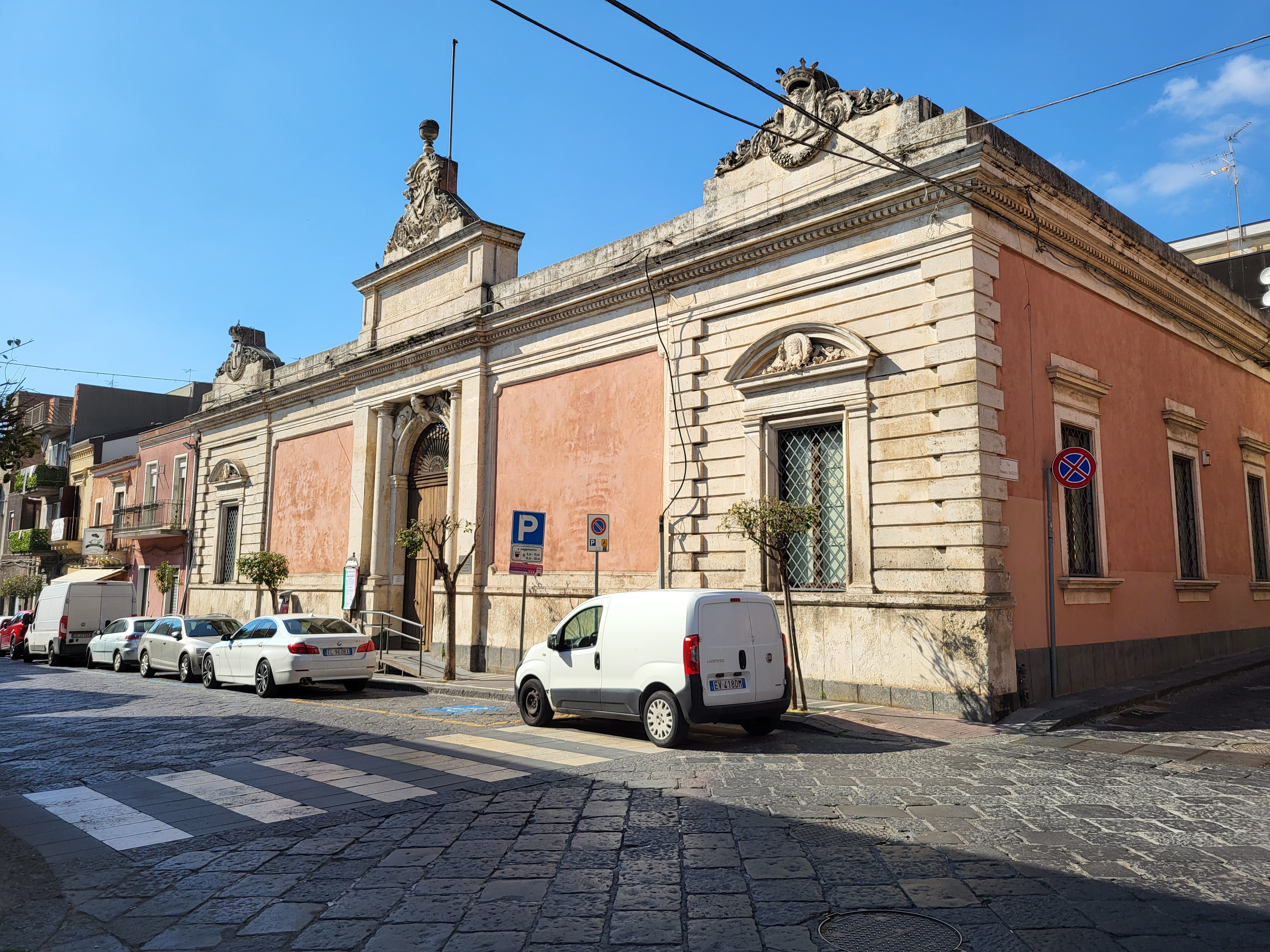

- Location within Italy Location within Sicily
- Coordinates: 37°31′N 15°0′E
- Country: Italy
- Region: Sicily
- Metropolitan city: Metropolitan City of Catania
- Frazioni: Belsito, Belvedere, Campanarazzu, Casa Landolina, Cravone, Cubba, Lineri, Madonna degli Ammalati, Montepalma, Piano Tavola, Piano del Lupo, Poggio del Lupo, Serra Inferiore, Serra Superiore

Government
  - Mayor: Giuseppe Marco Corsaro (since 27 October 2021)

Area
  - Total: 37.5 km^{2} (14.5 sq mi)
- Elevation: 210 m (690 ft)

Population (30 November 2024)
  - Total: 48,658
  - Density: 1,300/km^{2} (3,360/sq mi)
- Demonym: Misterbianchesi
- Time zone: UTC+1 (CET)
  - Summer (DST): UTC+2 (CEST)
- Postal code: 95045
- Dialing code: 095
- Website: www.comune.misterbianco.ct.it

Misterbianco (Sicilian: Mustariancu; Medieval Latin: Monasterium Album, lit. 'White Monastery' or 'White Minster') is a comune (municipality) in the Metropolitan City of Catania in the Italian region of Sicily, located about 6 kilometres (4 mi) west of Catania and about 160 kilometres (99 mi) southeast of Palermo.

Misterbianco borders the following municipalities: Camporotondo Etneo, Catania, Motta Sant'Anastasia, San Pietro Clarenza.

== History ==
The settlement's name derives from a former local monastery (in Medieval Latin: Monasterium Album, lit. 'White Monastery') in the contrada (district) of Campanarazzu (pejorative of Sicilian campanaru, lit. 'bell tower'), where monks, likely Dominicans, wore a white dress. However, both the monastery and the settlement were destroyed by the 1669 Etna eruption. A new borough was therefore built in the former contrada of Milicia.

Until the mid-19th century Misterbianco was a small rural settlement. However, after a large industrial complex was built in the area, its population grew substantially, up to 18,836 in 1971 and 40,785 in 1991. The town continues to grow in size due to people moving here from the increasingly costly quarter of Catania city.
