= So-Cal Speed Shop =

The So-Cal Speed Shop is a specialty parts shop for hot rods, specializing in cars built in the 1940s. It offers parts online, as well as a number of retail stores in the western United States and one in Canada. The headquarters is located in San Dimas, California.

Originally built in 1946, it was one of the first hot rod parts stores to open in Southern California. Founder Alex Xydias opened the shop on Olive Avenue in Burbank, California on March 3, 1946, the same day he was discharged from the Army Air Force. Xydias's first idea to open the speed shop came while watching a street race in San Fernando Valley during a furlough from the Army Air Forces. Xydias' shop offered only parts; no mechanical work was done. After his year lease was up, Xydias moved to 1104 South Victory Boulevard.

Numerous cars set records, mostly on the salt flats, flying the So-Cal banner and the shop became synonymous with winners. The first streamliner powered by a Flathead Ford to go over 200 mph (320 km/h) is the Edelbrock-equipped Bachelor-Xydias SoCal Special; it was featured on the cover of the January 1949 issue of Hot Rod magazine. Bill Burke of the So-Cal Speed Shop was the first to attempt to convert a P-51 Mustang belly drop tank to a hot rod roadster. Because of its small size (168 gallons), Burke then switched to the larger 305-gallon belly tank used on a P-38 Lightning. See also lakester.

The So-Cal gang was voted the Number One Racing Team in 1952 by Mechanix Illustrated magazine.

Lead guitarist for ZZ Top, Billy Gibbons made guest appearances for the shop's "Hard Shine" series.

In May 2011 launched the 'Miler', its first line of limited edition motorcycle kits. Inspired by 1960s and 1970s flat track Triumph racing bikes, and based on their Streetmaster and Mule Motorcycles concept bike, the Miler is powered by an 865cc twin-cylinder Triumph Bonneville. A combination of high-compression pistons, precision-engineered head porting, and exhaust tuning enhance the recreational aspect of the reliable street rider.
