= Malliga MAL 04 Speedbird =

2000s Austrian aircraft

MAL 04 Speedbird

General information
- Type: Experimental aircraft
- National origin: Austrian
- Manufacturer: Horst Josef Malliga
- Number built: 1

History
- First flight: 2013

The Malliga MAL 04 Speedbird was a high-speed experimental monoplane designed and built by Horst Josef Malliga.

== Design and development ==
Design of the Speedbird commenced in 2000, with construction starting in 2003. The aircraft is based around a surplus drop tank, that Malliga had purchased for €25.00, and which originally was fitted to a McDonnell Douglas F-4 Phantom II. It is a mid-wing monoplane of all-metal construction. The wings have no dihedral and are of narrow taper and fitted with outboard ailerons. The aircraft was equipped with a Cessna retractable tricycle undercarriage. A diesel engine, located in the middle of the fuselage, drove a five-bladed pusher propeller located to the rear of a V-tail empennage.

== Operational history ==
The aircraft was assigned the registration of OE-VMA. It first flew in 2013. A test flight in 2015 ended with when tail flutter caused the elevator to lock, forcing Malliga to make an emergency landing. Malliga suffered a bruised rib, but the aircraft was almost completely destroyed.

== Specifications (Malliga MAL 04 Speedbird) ==
Data from Keimel

General characteristics

- Crew: 2
- Length: 6.50 m (21 ft 4 in)
- Wingspan: 7.29 m (23 ft 11 in)
- Height: 5.80 m (19 ft 0 in)
- Wing area: 5.30 m^{2} (57.0 sq ft)
- Empty weight: 550 kg (1,213 lb)
- Max takeoff weight: 800 kg (1,764 lb)
- Powerplant: 1 × Zoche ZO 02A twin-radial Diesel, 220 kW (300 hp)
- Propellers: 5-bladed

Performance

- Maximum speed: 750 km/h (470 mph, 400 kn)
- Cruise speed: 550 km/h (340 mph, 300 kn)
- Minimum control speed: 160 km/h (99 mph, 86 kn)

== See also ==
- Malliga 1
- Malliga 2
