= Drop tank =

External tanks used to carry extra fuel

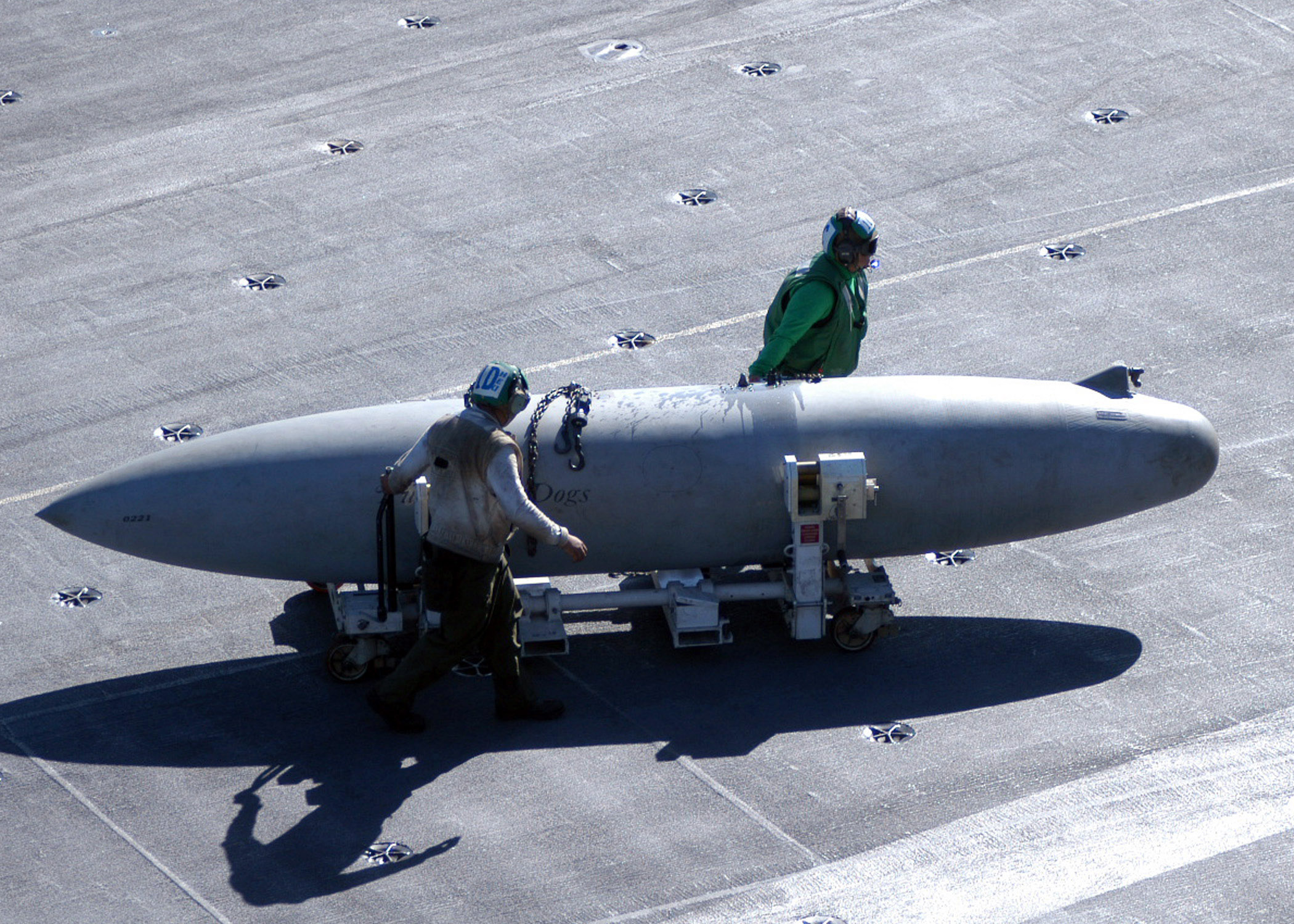
A 2,300-litre (600 US gal) Sargent Fletcher drop tank being moved across the flight deck of an aircraft carrier

In aviation, a drop tank (external tank, wing tank or belly tank) is used to describe auxiliary fuel tanks externally carried by aircraft. A drop tank is expendable and often capable of being jettisoned. External tanks are commonplace on modern military aircraft and occasionally found in civilian ones, although the latter are less likely to be discarded except in an emergency.

== Overview ==
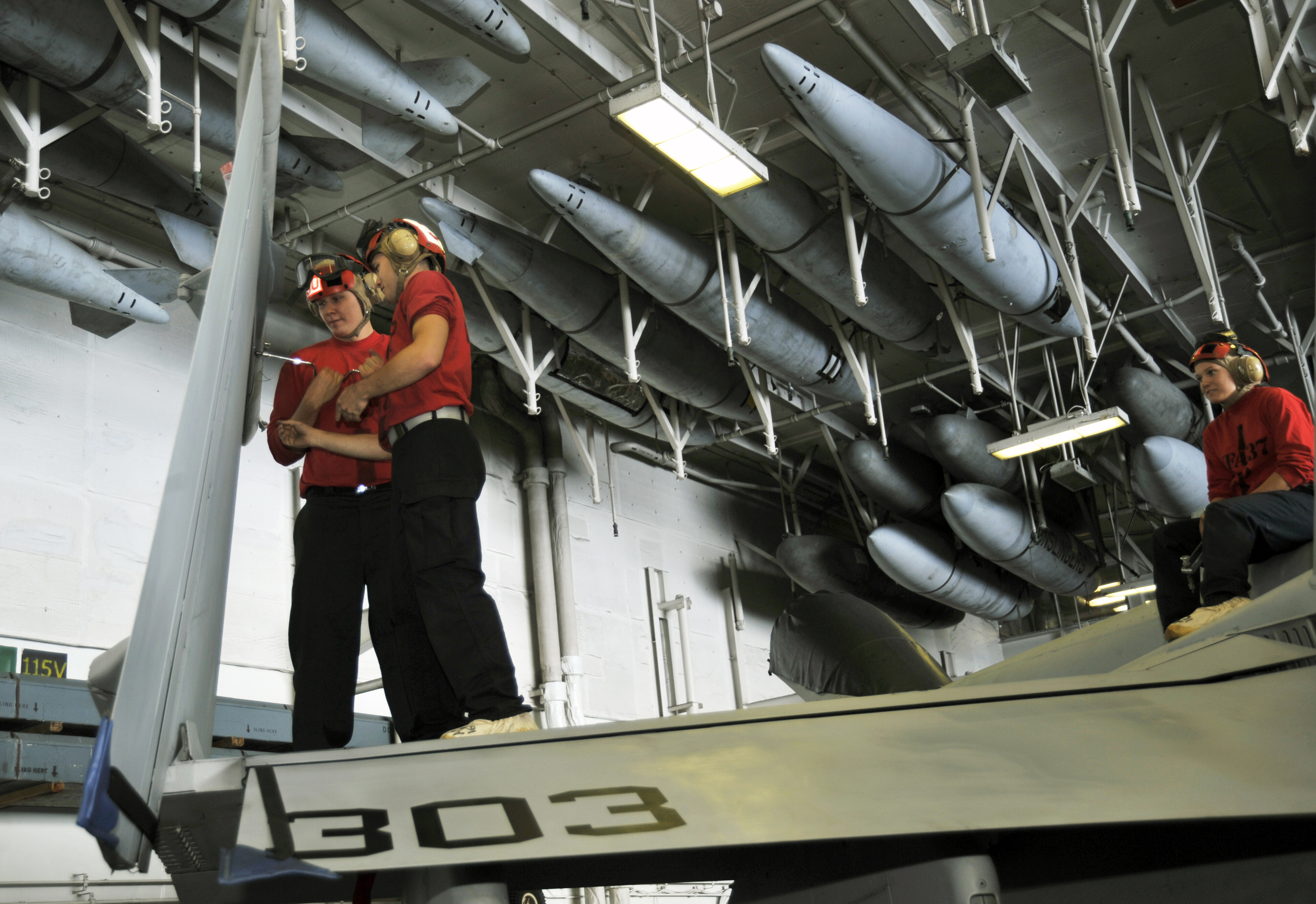
Drop tank storage aboard USS Harry S. Truman (CVN-75)

The primary disadvantage with drop tanks is that they impose a drag penalty on the aircraft. External fuel tanks will also increase the moment of inertia, thereby reducing roll rates for air maneuvers. Some of the drop tank's fuel is used to overcome the added drag and weight of the tank. Drag in this sense varies with the square of the aircraft's speed. The use of drop tanks also reduces the number of external hardpoints available for weapons, reduces the weapon-carrying capacity and increases the aircraft's radar signature. Usually the fuel in the drop tanks is consumed first, and only when all the fuel in the drop tanks has been used, the fuel selector is switched to the airplane's internal tanks. Some modern combat aircraft use conformal fuel tanks (CFTs) instead of or in addition to conventional external fuel tanks. CFTs produce less drag and do not take up external hardpoints but some versions can only be removed on the ground.

== History ==
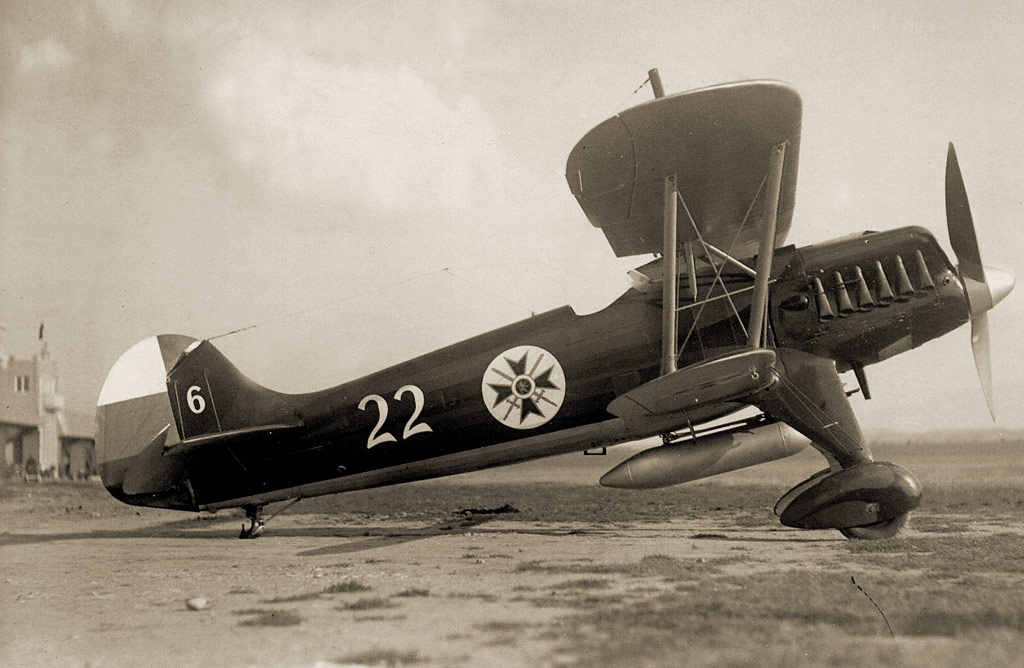
Bulgarian Heinkel He-51B, with drop tank under fuselage

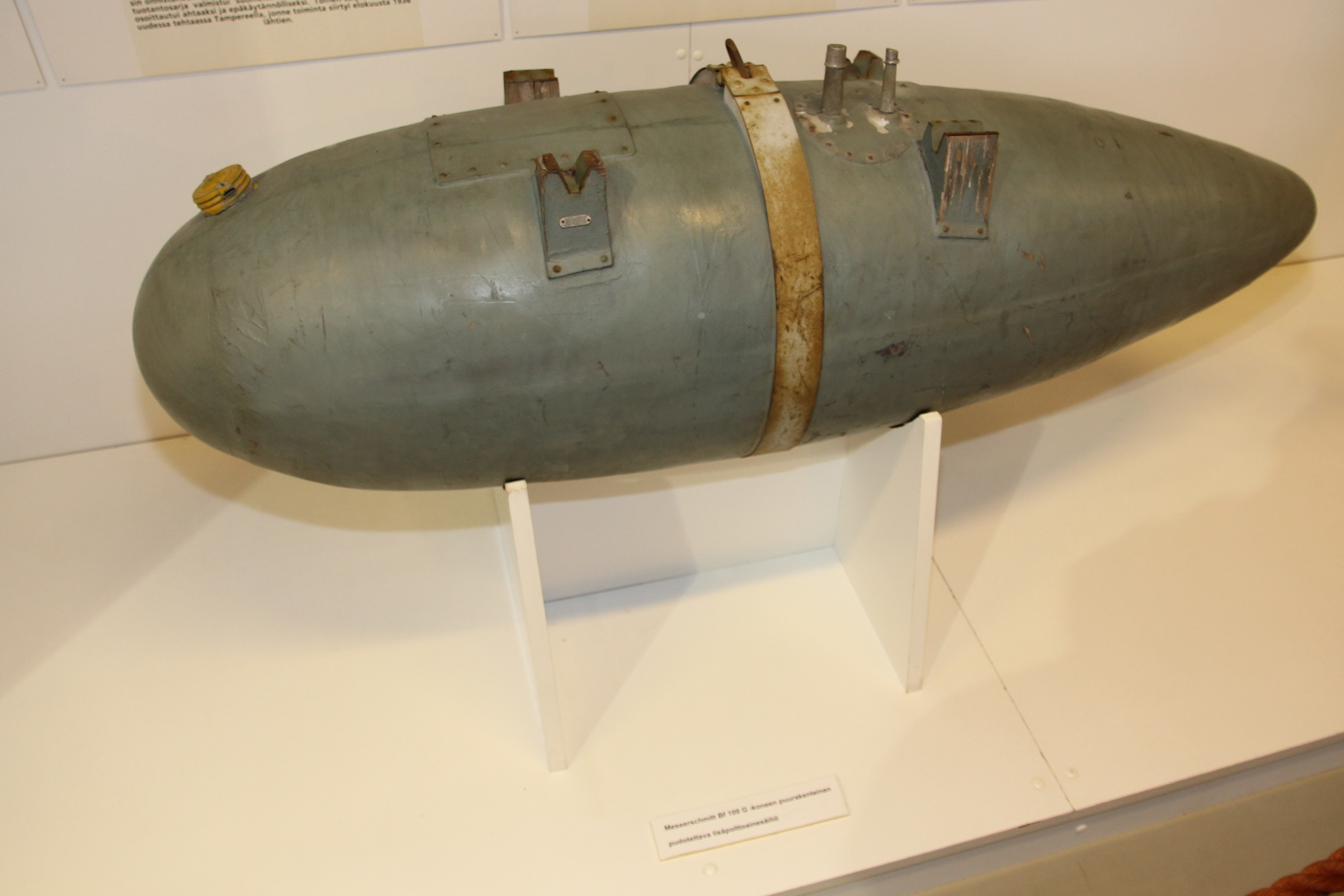
A standard 300 liter capacity drop tank of the German WWII Luftwaffe

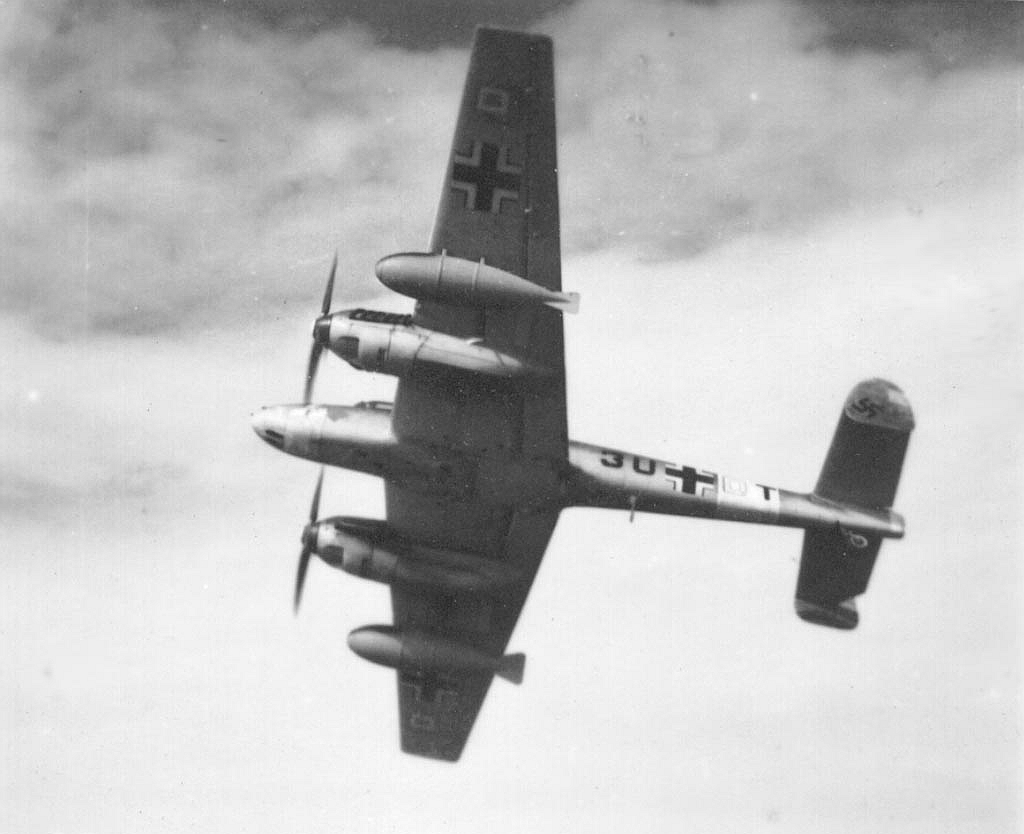
A Bf 110 of 9./ZG 26 with the rarely-used, fin-stabilized 900-liter drop tanks

The Siemens-Schuckert D.VI, tested in 1919, had a jettisonable main fuel tank under the fuselage.

According to Selfridge Field's history, drop tanks were first used on 5 March, 1923.

The drop tank was later used during the Spanish Civil War to allow fighter aircraft to carry additional fuel for long-range escort flights without requiring a dramatically larger, heavier, less maneuverable fuselage. Mitsubishi A5M, designed by Jiro Horikoshi, began carrying an external underside drop tank to provide fuel for extended range in 1937 and during World War II, the Luftwaffe began using external fuel tanks with the introduction of a 300-litre (66 imp gal; 79 US gal) light alloy model for the Ju 87R, a long-range version of the Stuka dive bomber, in early 1940. The Messerschmitt Bf 109 fighter also used this type of drop tank, starting with the Bf 109E-7 variant introduced in August 1940. Fitted also to the Focke-Wulf Fw 190, the 300-litre tank, available in at least four construction formats — including at least one impregnated paper material, single-use version — and varying only slightly in appearance, became the standard volume for most drop tanks in Luftwaffe service, with a rarely used 900-litre (200 imp gal; 240 US gal), fin-stabilized large capacity drop tank used with some marks of the Messerschmitt Bf 110 heavy fighter and other twin-engined Luftwaffe combat aircraft.

The first drop tanks were designed to be discarded when empty or in the event of combat or emergency to reduce drag, weight, and to increase maneuverability. Modern external tanks may be retained in combat, to be dropped in an emergency. The Allies commonly used them to allow fighters increased range and patrol time over continental Europe. The RAF used such external fuel tanks in 1942, during the transit of Supermarine Spitfires to Malta. The Imperial Japanese Navy design specification for what came to be the Japanese Mitsubishi A6M Zero fighter included endurance with drop tanks of two hours at full power, or six to eight hours at cruising speed. Drop tanks were commonly used with the Zero, even on combat air patrol (CAP). The Zero entered service in 1940.

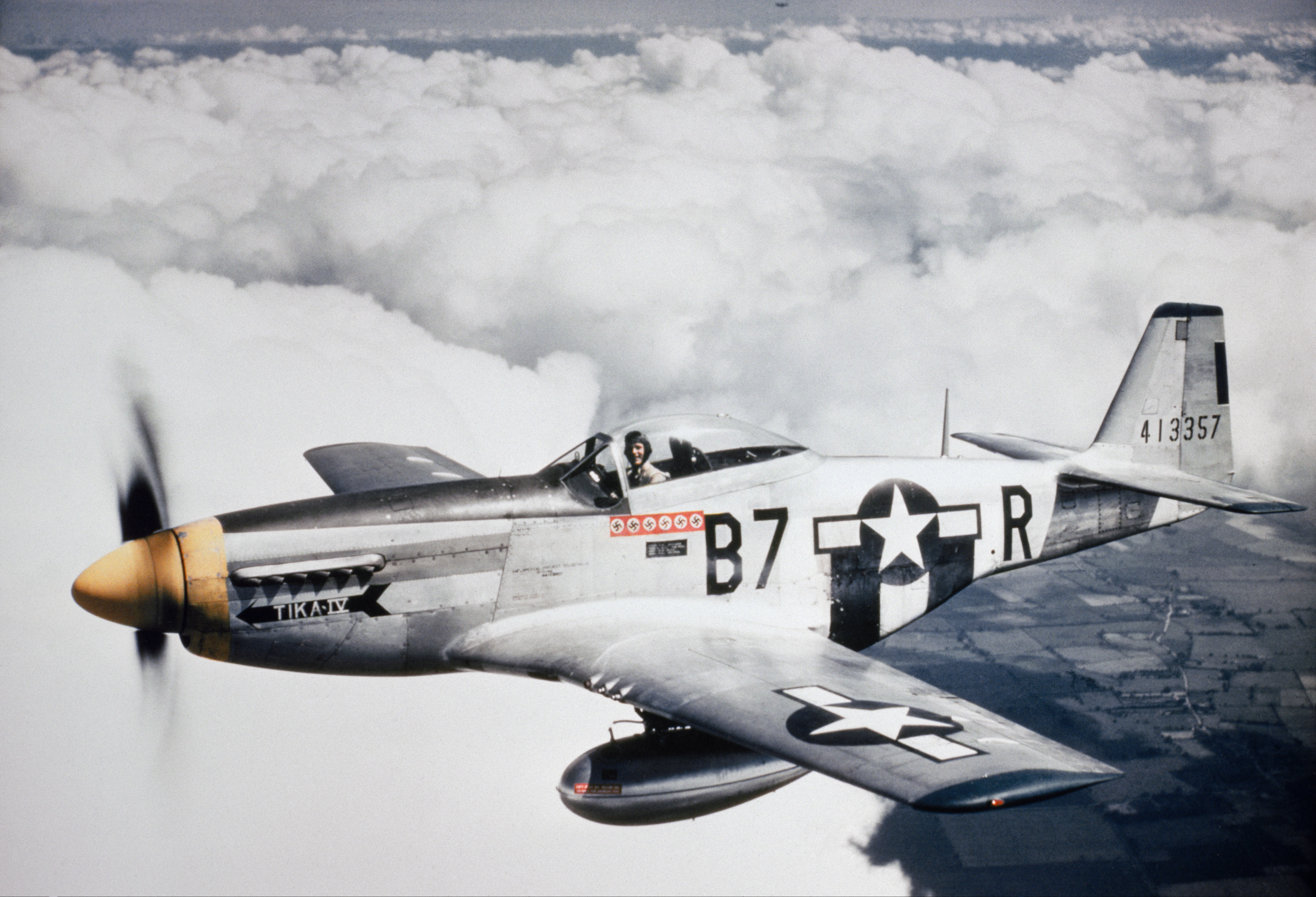
A P-51 Mustang with 75-US-gallon (280 L) metal drop tanks

American bomber theorists (the so-called Bomber Mafia) wanted to create self-defending fleets of heavy bombers. Consequently, American policy opposed drop tanks but airmen such as Benjamin S. Kelsey and Oliver P. Echols worked quietly to have drop tank technology added to American fighters. Drop tanks supplying 1,700 litres (450 US gal) of extra fuel per fighter allowed Lockheed Lightnings to carry out Operation Vengeance, the downing of Admiral Isoroku Yamamoto's aircraft. 8th Air Force General Ira C. Eaker experimented with British hardened paper drop tanks to extend the range of his Republic Thunderbolt fighters, but the results were unsatisfactory. Major General Jimmy Doolittle implemented metal drop tanks in 1944 for American fighters. External drop tanks turned fighters into a long-range escorts for daylight bombers and long sorties.

=== Paper-based drop tanks ===
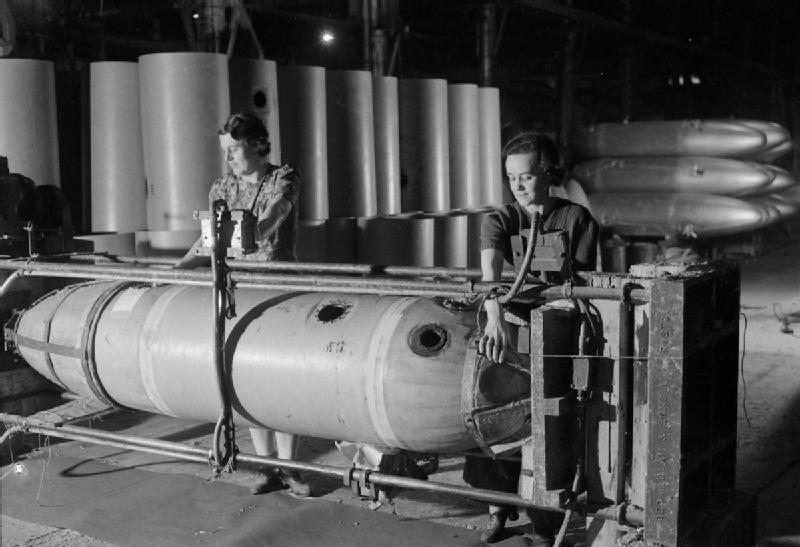
420-litre (110 US gal) paper drop tanks, destined for USAAF and RAF use, being manufactured at a British factory (1944)

Faced by wartime metal shortages and a need to extend the range of fighter craft, the British came up with drop tanks made of glue-impregnated kraft paper, which had excellent tolerance characteristics for extreme heat and cold necessary for operation on an aircraft as well as being waterproof.

Since the glue would slowly dissolve from the solvent effects of the fuel (sometimes developing leaks within a few hours of being loaded with fuel) these were strictly a single-use item, used in typically cold Northern European conditions, filled immediately before takeoff, jettisoned in the event of an aborted mission and only being required for the outbound portion of a flight. Such papier-mâché tanks were assembled from three main components, the nose cone, tail cone and the body, each shaped over wooden forms, the center section created by wrapping layers of the impregnated paper around a cylinder, the end caps hand-laminated with petal-shaped pieces sometimes called gores.

Before final assembly wooden anti-slosh baffles were installed, pipes and fittings were attached and the interiors coated with fuel-resistant lacquer and the three pieces were bonded together in press. Once the tank had cured, it was pressure tested to 41 kPa (6 psi) and passing tanks were given two coats of cellulose dope followed by two coats of aluminium paint. (British paper drop tanks can be distinguished from outwardly similar metal tanks by colour, paper tanks were silver in appearance, while metal tanks were grey.) Some 13,000 papier-mâché tanks were made and used by the RAF, the vast majority during the war, conserving a considerable amount of metal. Very few examples survive due to their expendable nature, low intrinsic value and the fact that they are not inherently robust. While probably a nuisance for those under the flight path when the empty tanks were released, they were lightweight and comparatively fragile. Though they were likely to cause nothing but anxiety, the German authorities went so far as to distribute leaflets explaining that drop tanks were not bombs.

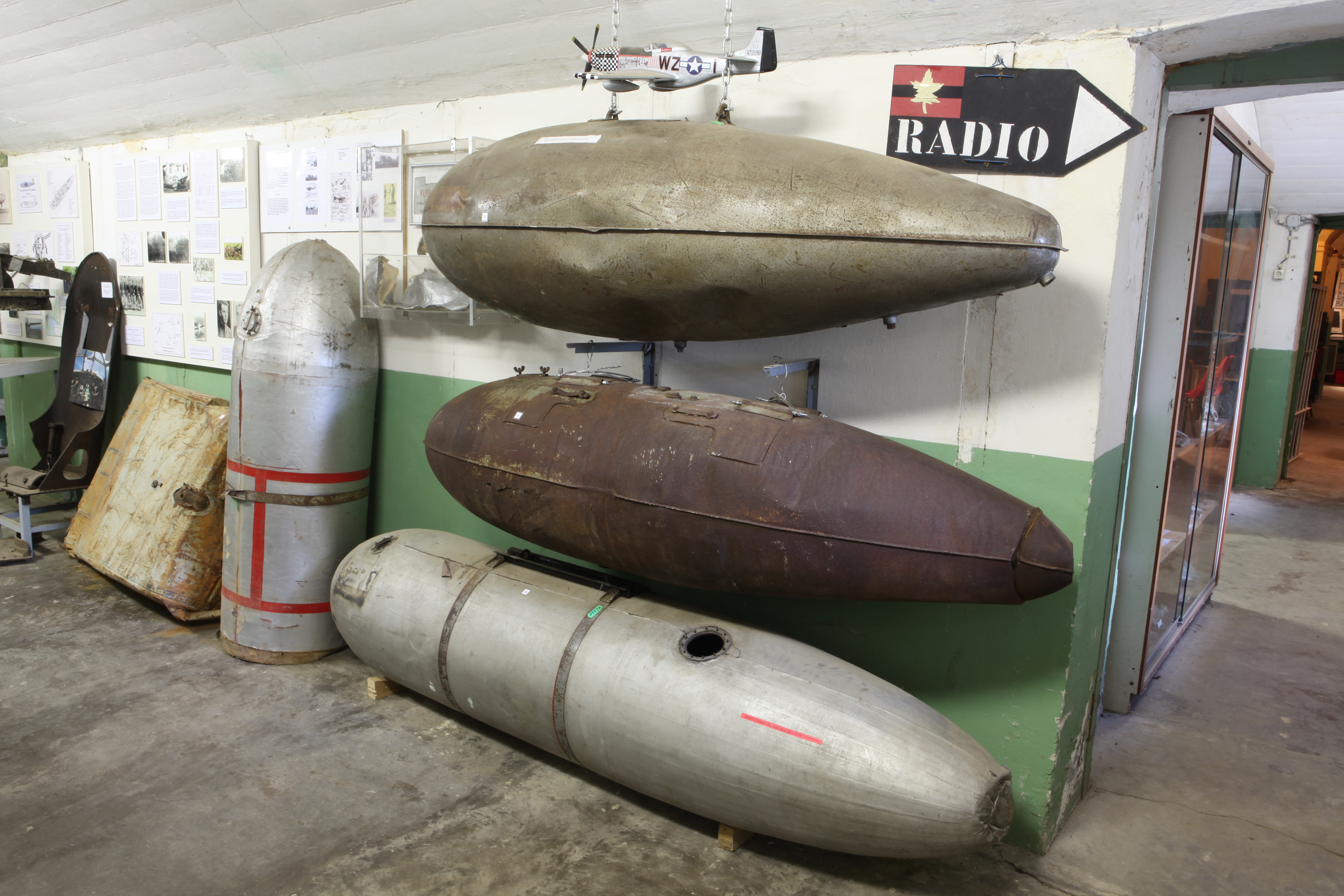
420-litre (110 US gal) paper, and 280-litre (75 US gal) metal drop tanks displayed at the Luchtoorlogsmuseum, an aviation museum in the Netherlands (2012)

US paper tanks were developed by Col. Bob Shafer and Col. Cass Hough, who spent many hours developing a 420-litre (110 US gal) paper tank, then getting them into series production at Bowater-Lloyd's of London, only to be told by experts at Wright Field "paper tanks are absolutely unfeasible and will not do the job for which they are intended". Since by the time the experts made that pronouncement 8th Air Force fighters had already used more than 15,000 paper tanks without a failure, the criticism was not taken seriously. It may explain why the most often-used fuel tanks for single-engined American fighters operating in Northern Europe were the 280-litre (75 US gal) capacity all-metal tank (made from two halves of formed aluminium with a prominent horizontal seam running along the tank's midline). Another common metal drop tank was the 570-to-620-litre (150 to 165 US gal) model used by P-51s, P-47s and P-38s.

Paper drop tanks were also improvised as napalm munitions.

=== Post-war use ===
The Matra JL-100 is a special hybrid drop tank and rocket pack; it combines a rocket launcher in front with 19 SNEB 68 mm (2.7 in) rockets and 250 litres (66 US gal) of fuel behind into one single aerodynamically shaped pod for mounting on combat aircraft such as the Dassault Mirage IIIs and English Electric Lightnings. The Convair B-58 Hustler, the first operational bomber capable of Mach 2 flight, had no bomb bay: it carried a single nuclear weapon plus fuel in a combination bomb/fuel pod underneath the fuselage.

== Civilian use ==
=== Aeronautical ===
At least two aircraft have been built using re-purposed drop tanks. The Prue 160 glider from 1945 had its forward fuselage built from a Lockheed P-38 Lightning drop tank. The 2013 Malliga MAL 04 Speedbird used a McDonnell Douglas F-4 Phantom II drop tank as its fuselage.

=== Automotive ===
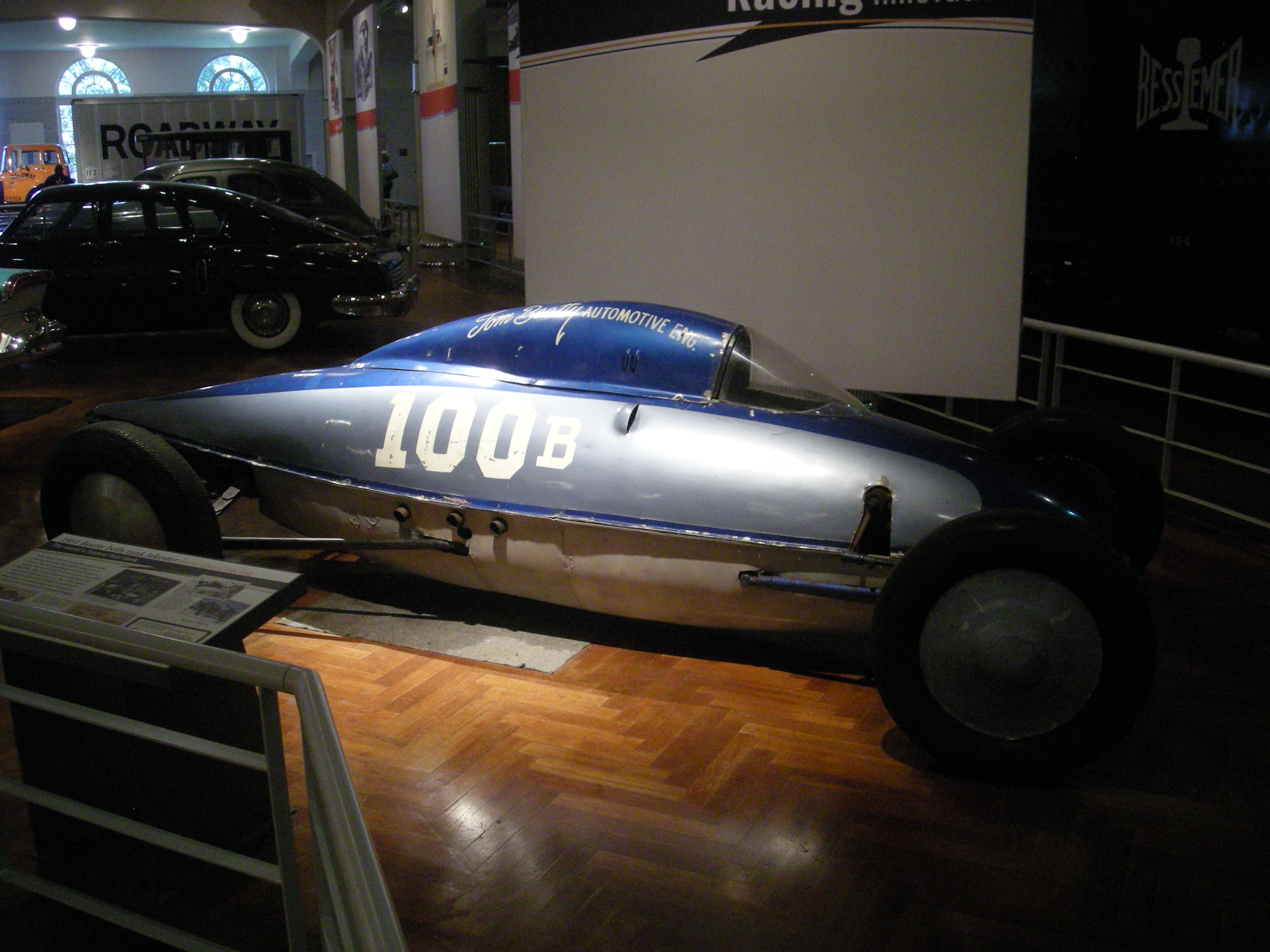
The 1951 Beatty belly tank lakester on display at the Henry Ford Museum in 2012

After World War II, hot rodders raced the dry lakes of California to set new land speed records. War surplus drop tanks (aka belly tanks) were plentiful, aerodynamically neutral and it did not take long to convert one into a car, dubbed a lakester. According to GM historians, Bill Burke of the So-Cal Speed Shop first attempted to convert a 640-litre (168 US gal) P-51 Mustang belly tank, before switching to the larger 1,150-litre (305 US gal) P-38 Lightning tank. Even now, lakesters compete at the Bonneville Salt Flats.

=== Nautical ===
Drop tanks expended by American aircraft during the Vietnam War have been repurposed into small boats.

== See also ==
- Index of aviation articles
