= Prue 160 =

American glider

160

General information
- Type: Glider
- National origin: United States
- Designer: Irving Prue
- Status: Sole example destroyed
- Number built: One

History
- Introduction date: 1945

The Prue 160 was an American mid-wing, V-tailed, single-seat glider that was designed and built by Irving Prue in 1945.

== Design and development ==
The 160 was constructed by Prue at the end of the Second World War, at a time when small, maneuverable gliders were in fashion. As a result, the 160 had a wingspan of just 40 ft (12.2 m).

The 160 was an all-metal design, with the wing skins, spar webs and ribs made from magnesium. The forward fuselage was built from a Lockheed P-38 Lightning drop tank. The wing employed a symmetrical NACA 0018 airfoil at the wing root, that transitioned to a NACA 0009 section at the wing tip. The aircraft had flaps that were mounted external to the wing and airfoil-shaped. The aircraft's empty weight was very light at 160 lb (73 kg).

Only one Prue 160 was built.

== Operational history ==
The Prue 160 was flown by Harold Huber in the 1947 US Nationals. It was later owned by Roger Freeman of San Antonio, Texas and James F. Jenista Jr.of Boulder City, Nevada.

While owned by Jenista the aircraft was destroyed in an accident on 11 June 1994 at the Jean Airport in Jean, Nevada. The National Transportation Safety Board determined that the pilot did not properly connect the aileron control linkage when the aircraft was assembled for flight and then did not detect the fault during the preflight inspection. The pilot become aware of the problem on take-off on aerotow. The pilot released from the tow plane at about 20 to 30 ft (6 to 9 m), the right wing collided with the ground and the glider crashed resulting in minor injury to the pilot. The aircraft was not repaired and was removed from the Federal Aviation Administration registry on 29 April 1995.

== Specifications (160) ==
Data from Soaring

General characteristics

- Crew: One
- Wingspan: 40 ft 0 in (12.19 m)
- Wing area: 80 sq ft (7.4 m^{2})
- Aspect ratio: 20:1
- Airfoil: root: NACA 0018, wing tip: NACA 0009
- Empty weight: 160 lb (73 kg)
- Gross weight: 360 lb (163 kg)

Performance

- Maximum glide ratio: 26:1 at 52 mph (84 km/h)
- Rate of sink: 168 ft/min (0.85 m/s) at 40 mph (64 km/h)
- Wing loading: 4.5 lb/sq ft (22 kg/m^{2})

== See also ==
Related lists

- List of gliders
