= Motta Sant'Anastasia =

- Comune
- Comune di Motta Sant'Anastasia
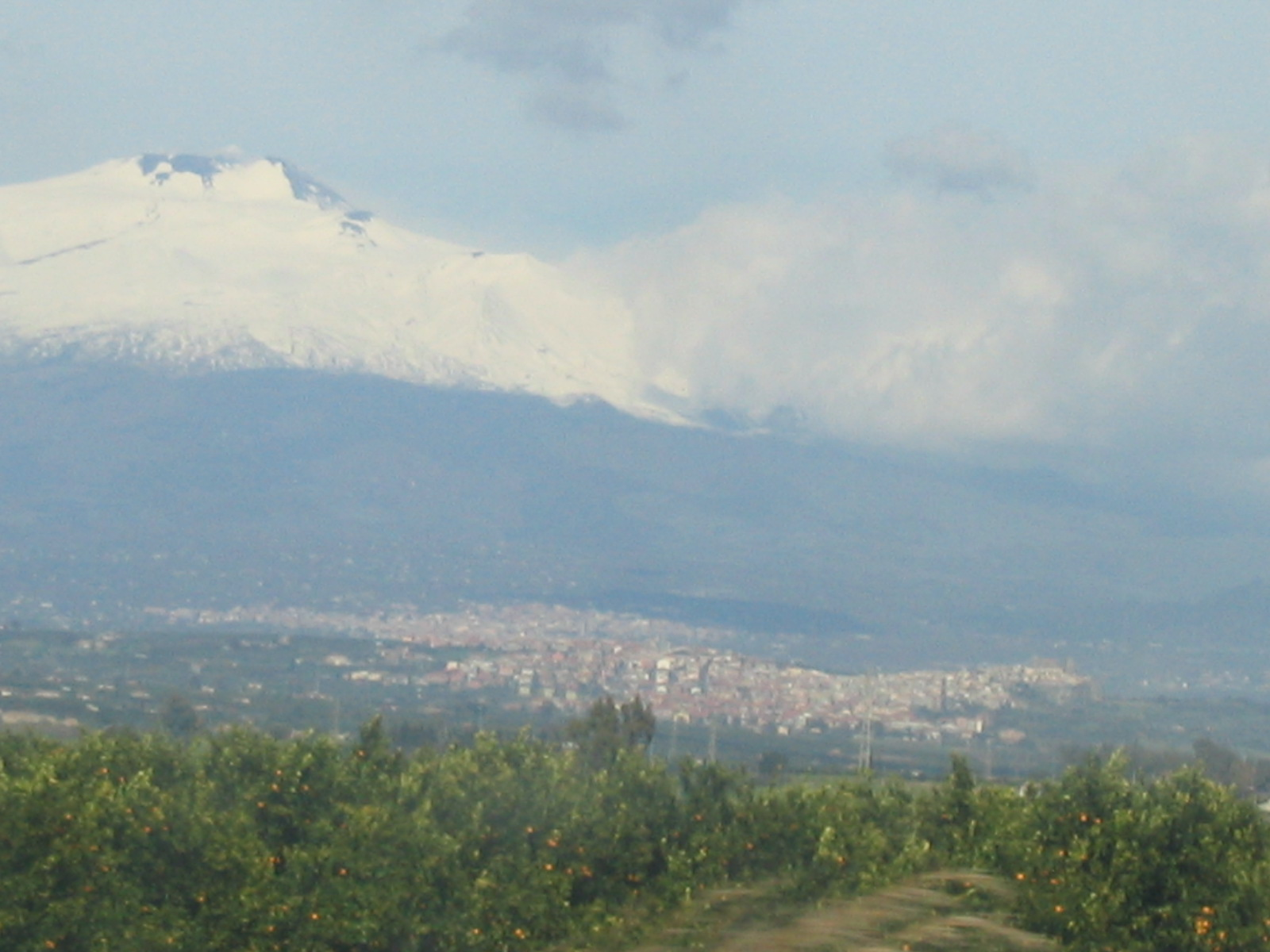

- Location within Italy Location within Sicily
- Coordinates: 37°30′N 14°58′E
- Country: Italy
- Region: Sicily
- Metropolitan city: Catania (CT)
- Frazioni: Piano Tavola

Government
  - Mayor: Anastasio Carrà

Area
  - Total: 35.7 km^{2} (13.8 sq mi)
- Elevation: 275 m (902 ft)

Population (1 January 2016)
  - Total: 12,116
  - Density: 339/km^{2} (879/sq mi)
- Demonym: Mottesi
- Time zone: UTC+1 (CET)
  - Summer (DST): UTC+2 (CEST)
- Postal code: 95040
- Dialing code: 095
- Website: www.comune.mottasantanastasia.ct.it

Motta Sant'Anastasia (Italian pronunciation: [ˈmɔtta santanastaˈziːa]) is a comune (municipality) in the Metropolitan City of Catania in the Italian region Sicily, located about 160 kilometres (99 mi) southeast of Palermo and about 9 kilometres (6 mi) west of Catania.

== Geography ==
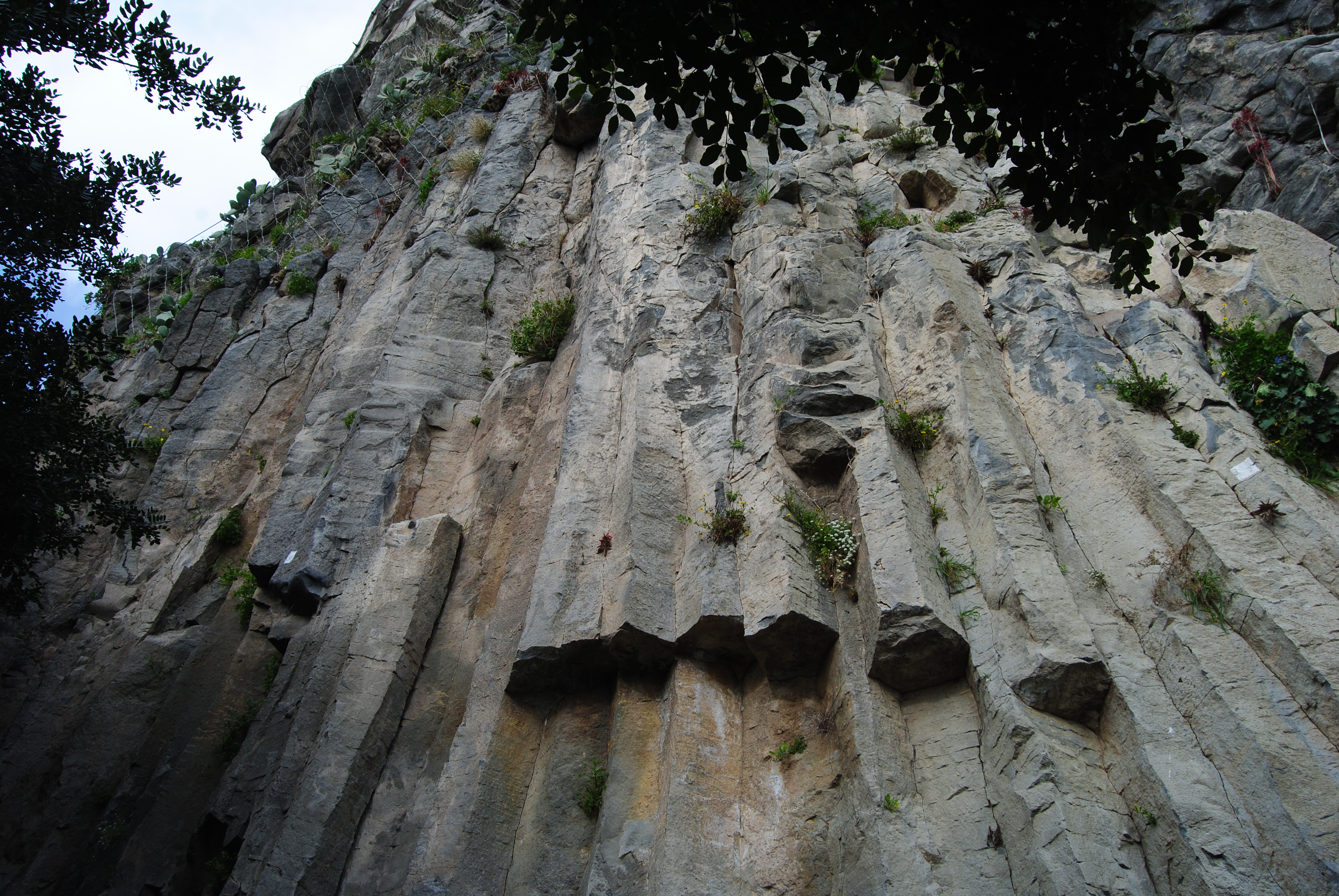
Volcanic plug of Motta Sant'Anastasia

Motta Sant'Anastasia borders the following municipalities: Belpasso, Camporotondo Etneo, Catania, Misterbianco.

The oldest part of Motta Sant'Anastasia was built on a volcanic plug. A long and intense eruption dating back to 550,000 years ago caused the formation of this volcanic cone. Over the centuries, through erosion the cone has acquired its current shape having a quasi-regular, prismatic-hexagonal and pentagonal section, reaching a height of 65 metres (213 ft).

The vegetation on the rock is made up of lichens and Indian fig (Opuntia ficus-indica), originally from Mexico but naturalized in the Mediterranean basin.

== History ==
Motta, like other cities in the Simeto Valley, has ancient origins. Archaeological studies dating back to 1954 in contrada Ardizzone, testify Greek presence in the territory around the 5th–4th centuries BC. The Roman period, however, was evidenced by the discovery of some coins from the period of the great empire, and a mosaic found in contrada Acquarone, belonging to a rural villa.

On behalf of Motta Sant'Anastasia name there are several hypotheses. According to some scholars Motta (pre-Roman name) and Anastasia (Greek-Byzantine name) have similar meanings and indicate the nature of the place, the typical relief of the territory that has been characterized by the Neck and the surrounding area of Motta Sant'Anastasia. Later in the 12th–14th centuries, the two names were combined and citizens joined in devotion to Sant'Anastasia, patroness of the town.

Motta, since as early as the 4th century BC, has held a role of considerable importance as a stronghold of warning and defence.

This role grew in the Middle Ages, during the Norman period, when Roger of Hauteville built a tower, in basalt stone, to guard the entrance of the plain of Catania and protect the area from Saracen incursions. "La Motta", in fact, consisted of an elevated place from where it was possible to control the entire territory.

The first settlement outside the walls was the district of Urnazza that, around 1500, grew near the church of St. Anthony, previously a burial area. In 1526 the city became a fief of Antonio Moncada, Count of Adernò, and for four centuries, until the 20th century, the castle was used as a prison.

In the late 17th century there were 560 inhabitants in Motta. Between the late 18th and the early 19th centuries, new neighborhoods formed, including Croce, Pozzo and Sciddichenti. In 1798 the inhabitants of Motta became 1400, rising to 2181 in the 1831 census of 1831.

On 1 January 1820 the Court of Catania founded the separate commune of Motta Sant'Anastasia.

Close-up of the Norman Tower in Motta Sant'Anastasia

== Main sights ==
The Tower of Motta ("donjon" or "Keep" in English) was built between 1070 and 1074 by the will of the Count Roger of Hauteville. The massive tower with a rectangular plan, with a base of about 21.5 by 9 by 17 metres (71 by 30 by 56 ft), is about 21 metres (69 ft) high and is a typical defensive structure of the early Middle Ages. The roof terrace retains almost intact battlements (22 merlons with rounded head).

The structure consists of three elevations. Only the first of these is still the original arched windows ogive (external) and at all sixth (inside). The other two square windows, on other levels, such as the current front door, go back to the 15th century.The ground floor was designed for military housing. In it there are a number of holes for defence.

Santa Maria del Rosario and Sant'Antonio da Padova are two of the town's churches.

On the Strada Provinciale 13, near the Strada statale 121 (SS 121) and the neighbouring commune of Misterbianco is the German War Cemetery for German soldiers fallen in World War II.

== People ==
Giuseppe Di Stefano was a native of Motta Sant'Anastasia.
