= Speed shop =

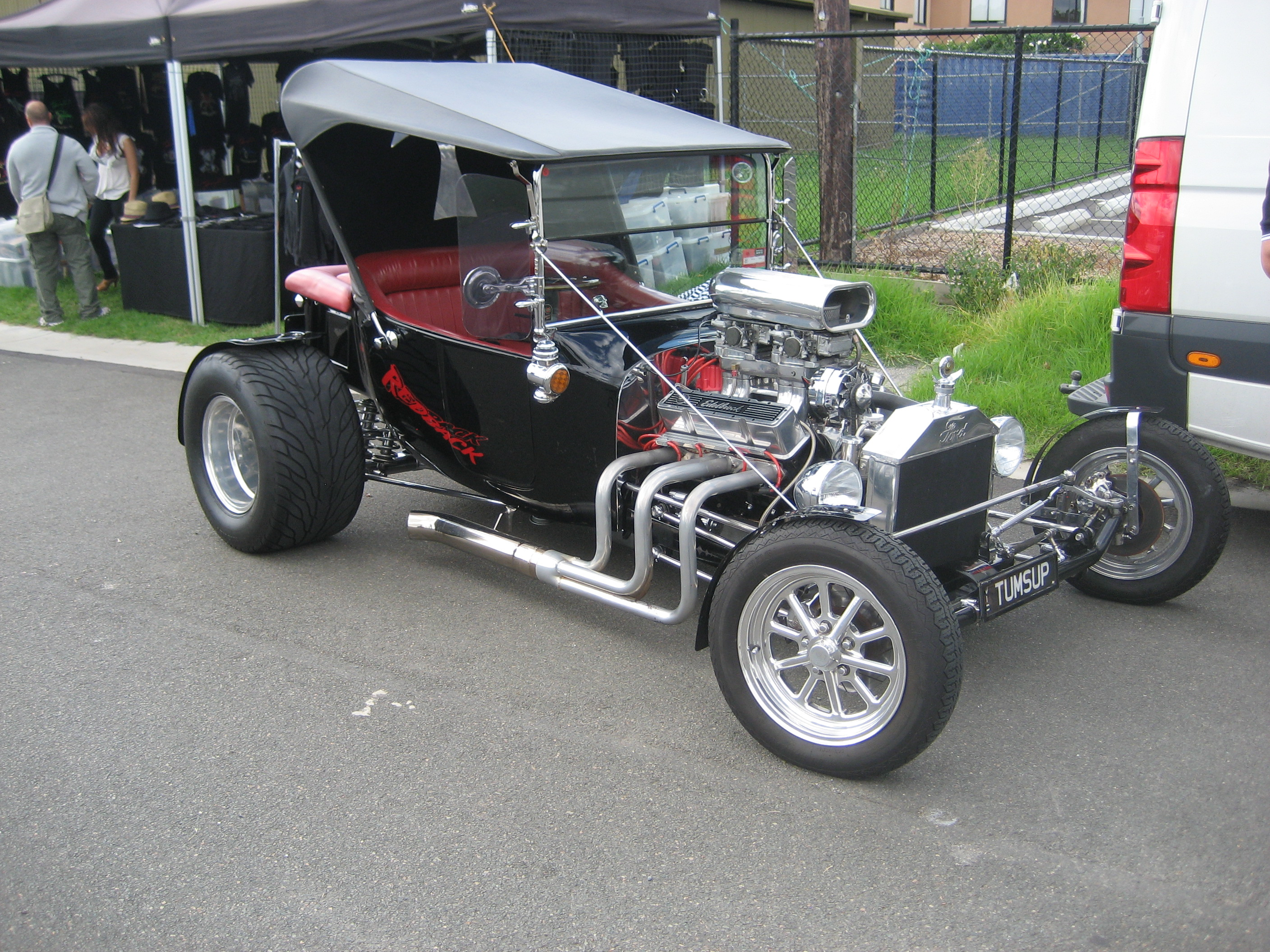
Ford Model T Hotrod

Speed shops are local brick and mortar businesses that typically offer aftermarket automotive accessories intended to increase automobile performance. They came into existence in the 1940s in North America as a result of the then rising popularity of hotrod culture. The term broadened to encompass motorcycles.
