= Camporotondo Etneo =

- Comune
- Comune di Camporotondo Etneo
- The territory of Camporotondo Etneo within the Province of Catania

- Location within Italy Location within Sicily
- Coordinates: 37°34′N 15°0′E
- Country: Italy
- Region: Sicily
- Metropolitan city: Catania (CT)
- Frazioni: Piano Tavola

Government
  - Mayor: Filippo Privitera

Area
  - Total: 6.4 km^{2} (2.5 sq mi)
- Elevation: 445 m (1,460 ft)

Population (30 November 2016)
  - Total: 5,052
  - Density: 790/km^{2} (2,000/sq mi)
- Demonym: Camporotondesi
- Time zone: UTC+1 (CET)
  - Summer (DST): UTC+2 (CEST)
- Postal code: 95040
- Dialing code: 095
- Patron saint: St. Anthony Abbot
- Saint day: 17 January
- Website: www.comune.camporotondoetneo.ct.it

Camporotondo Etneo (Sicilian: Campurutunnu Etneu) is a comune (municipality) in the Metropolitan City of Catania in the Italian region Sicily, located about 160 km (99 mi) southeast of Palermo and about 8 km (5 mi) northwest of Catania.

Camporotondo Etneo borders the following municipalities: Belpasso, Misterbianco, Motta Sant'Anastasia, San Pietro Clarenza.

== History ==
The historical origins of the comune of Camporotondo Etneo go back to the 17th century when the marquise Diego Reitano obtained its property from Antonio Reitano. At that time the name of the town was not Camporotondo Etneo but Camporeale. Reitano was married with Teresa Mauroli, a noblewoman originary from Messina. In 1730, Camporotondo was a marquisate and, in 1733, Reitano became senator of Messina. In the 17th century, the high number of eruptions deeply altered the morphology of the land surrounding Camporeale leading to the decision to change the town name into Camporotondo.
