= San Pietro Clarenza =

- Comune
- Comune di San Pietro Clarenza
- Location within Italy Location within Sicily
- Coordinates: 37°34′N 15°1′E
- Country: Italy
- Region: Sicily
- Metropolitan city: Catania (CT)

Government
  - Mayor: Giuseppe Bandieramonte

Area
  - Total: 6.4 km^{2} (2.5 sq mi)
- Elevation: 463 m (1,519 ft)

Population (30 November 2015)
  - Total: 7,912
  - Density: 1,200/km^{2} (3,200/sq mi)
- Demonym: Clarentini (or Sanpietresi)
- Time zone: UTC+1 (CET)
  - Summer (DST): UTC+2 (CEST)
- Postal code: 95030
- Dialing code: 095
- Website: www.comune.sanpietroclarenza.ct.it

San Pietro Clarenza (Sicilian: San Petru Clarenza) is a comune (municipality) in the Metropolitan City of Catania in the Italian region Sicily, located about 160 kilometres (99 mi) southeast of Palermo and about 7 kilometres (4 mi) northwest of Catania.

San Pietro Clarenza borders the following municipalities: Belpasso, Camporotondo Etneo, Catania, Mascalucia, Misterbianco.
