= Dan Kahn =

Businessperson, author, and marketeer

- Born: West Hills, California
- Citizenship: American
- Education: California State University, Northridge (BA)
- Occupations: Businessperson, author, marketeer
- Website: dankahn.com

Dan Kahn is an American businessperson, author, and marketeer known for his public relations, brand strategy, and digital marketing work. He is the founder and CEO of Kahn Media, Inc. and TREAD Agency. Kahn is also the author of The New Rules of the Road: How to Navigate the Rapidly Changing Marketing Landscape, and the host of the Only The Strong Survive podcast.

== Career ==
=== Kahn Media, Inc. ===
In 2008, Kahn founded Kahn Media, Inc., a marketing and public relations agency. The agency has represented high-profile clients in the automotive, luxury, and lifestyle sectors, including Lotus, Maserati, SEMA, Rolex, and King of the Hammers.

Under Kahn's leadership, Kahn Media has received several accolades, including being named the #1 agency in the region by the San Fernando Valley Business Journal for six consecutive years and being listed on the Inc. 5000 list of fastest-growing companies three times. The agency also won a Hermes Award for its digital marketing campaign for Cognito Motorsports.

=== TREAD Agency ===
In 2022, Kahn acquired and rebuilt TREAD Agency, a Bozeman, Montana-based firm specializing in experiential marketing and branding for the outdoor recreation industry. TREAD Agency works with brands in hunting, fishing, camping, overlanding, and shooting sports, providing integrated marketing solutions and creative content.

=== Authorship ===
Kahn is the author of The New Rules of the Road: How to Navigate the Rapidly Changing Marketing Landscape, published in January 2025 by Advantage Books. The book explores strategies for adapting to evolving consumer behavior and leveraging digital platforms in modern marketing. It became a certified Amazon bestseller in the PR and Marketing New Release categories.

== Industry Involvement ==
Kahn has held several leadership positions within the Specialty Equipment Market Association (SEMA), the trade association for the automotive aftermarket industry. He served two terms on the SEMA Board of Directors, chaired the Show Committee, and led the youth engagement task force. In 2019, he was named SEMA Person of the Year for his contributions to the industry.

== Podcasting ==
Kahn hosts the podcast Only The Strong Survive. The podcast interviews notable figures, including photographer Larry Chen, Patagonia creative director Dylan Tomine, MMA fighter Tim Kennedy, and Montana Governor Greg Gianforte.

== Public speaking and thought leadership ==
Kahn is a public speaker presenting at industry conferences, trade shows, and corporate events on modern marketing, PR, and brand strategy topics. He has spoken at events such as the SEMA Show, where he previously served on the Board of Directors.

== Awards and recognition ==
- SEMA Person of the Year (2019): Recognized for his leadership and contributions to the automotive aftermarket industry.
- Inc. 5000 List: Kahn Media was listed three times as one of the fastest-growing companies in the U.S.
- Hermes Award: Received for the digital marketing campaign for Cognito Motorsports.
- San Fernando Valley Business Journal: Named Kahn Media the #1 agency in the region for six consecutive years.
