= SEMA (association) =

Specialty Equipment Market Association

- Specialty Equipment Market Association
- Abbreviation: SEMA
- Formation: 1963; 63 years ago
- Headquarters: United States of America
- Members: 10251
- Website: https://www.sema.org/

Specialty Equipment Market Association (SEMA) of the automotive aftermarket was formed in 1963 by Paul Schiefer, Roy Richter, Ed Iskenderian, Els Lohn, Willie Garner, Bob Hedman, Robert E. Wyman, John Bartlett, Phil Weiand Jr, Al Segal, Dean Moon, and Vic Edelbrock Jr. Now it consists of 6,383 companies worldwide, bringing together aftermarket manufacturers, original equipment manufacturers (OEM), media, car dealers, specialty equipment distributors, installers, retailers, and restoration specialists.

The largest of the SEMA events, held annually during the first week of November, is the SEMA Show at the Las Vegas Convention Center in Las Vegas, Nevada, in conjunction with the Automotive Aftermarket Industry Week. As part of this event, SEMA and other automotive aftermarket trade groups make up one of the single largest events on the Las Vegas calendar. This auto show is not open to the public. Registration as media, manufacturer, buyer or exhibitor is required.

On August 5, 2020, SEMA announced that its 2020 show would be cancelled for the first time in the show's history, due to the COVID-19 pandemic.

== History ==
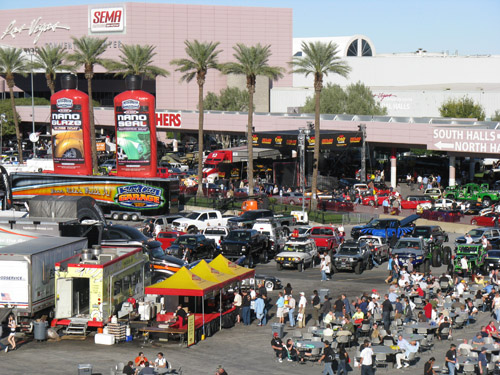
The 2008 SEMA Show at the Las Vegas Convention Center

The SEMA acronym originally stood for Speed Equipment Manufacturing Association. In 1970, government regulations became an issue and the name was changed to Specialty Equipment Market Association to improve the overall image of the association. It was also warned that bureaucrats in the industry may be turned off by the word "speed," which Corporate Council Earl Kitner felt they may associate with "the swinging generation." SEMA came about as a result of the company Revell Models attempting to fill a gap in industry trade regulation. Its first president was Ed Iskenderian. Other original members of the organization include Roy Richter, Willie Garner, Bob Hedman, Robert E. Wyman, Paul Schiefer, John Bartlett, Phil Weiand Jr., Al Segal, Dean Moon, and Vic Edelbrock Jr.

Founding members of SEMA

Company	Founder
Ansen Automotive Engineering	Louie Senter
B&M Automotive Products	Bob Spar
Cragar Industries Inc.	Roy Richter
Eelco Manufacturing & Supply	Els Lohn
Grant Industries	John Bartlett
Ed Iskenderian Racing Cams	Ed Iskenderian
Milodon Engineering	Don Alderson
Moon Equipment Company	Dean Moon
Schiefer Manufacturing	Paul Schiefer
Trans Dapt	Willie Garner
Weber Speed Equipment	Harry Weber
Weiand Power & Racing	Phil Weiand
Dempsey Wilson Racing Cams	Dempsey Wilson

== SEMA Show ==
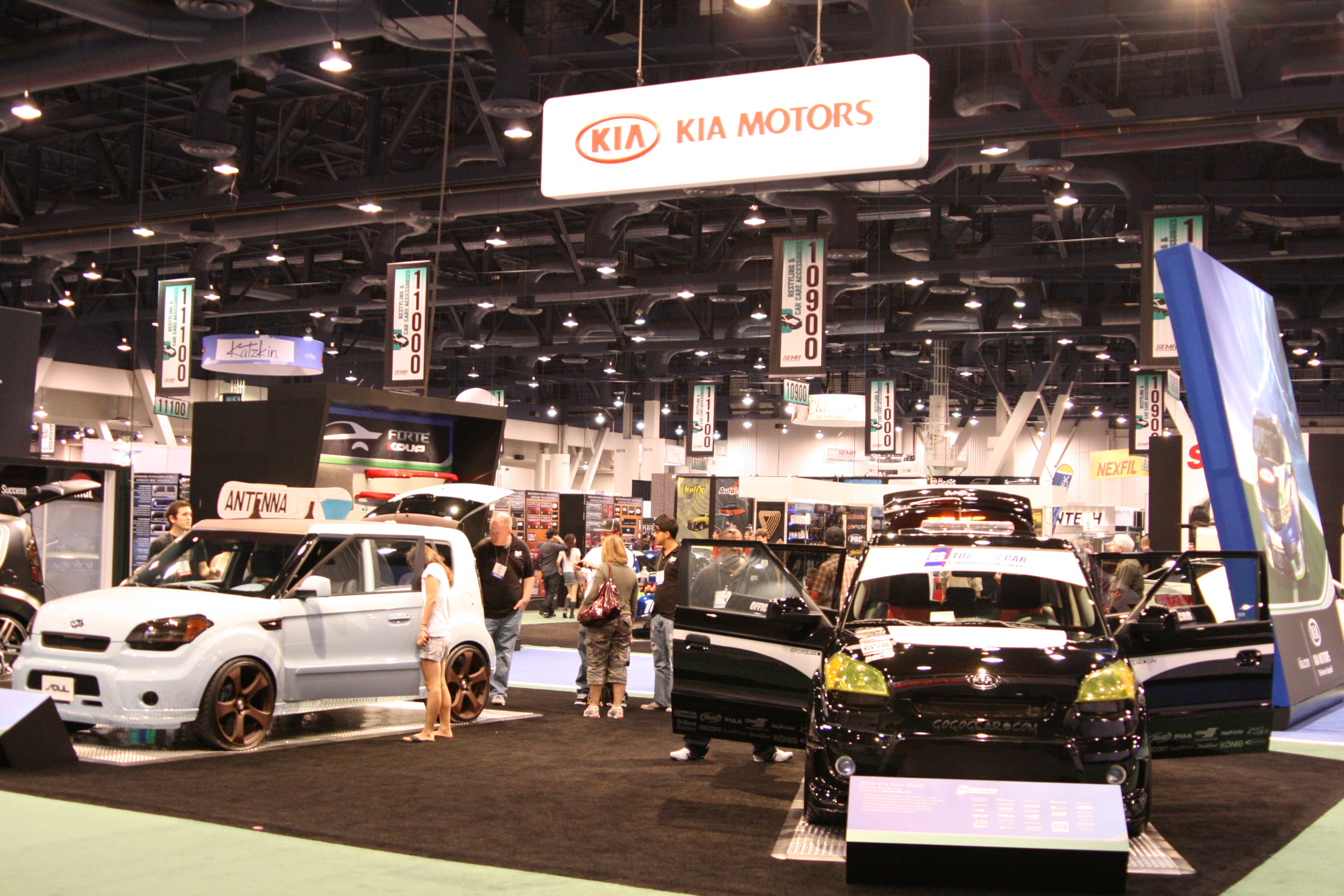
The exhibit hall of the 2009 SEMA Show

The SEMA Show is held at the Las Vegas Convention Center. It is among the largest conventions held in Vegas. The 2013 SEMA Show drew about 60,000 buyers. The displays are segmented into 12 sections, and a New Products Showcase features nearly 2,000 newly introduced parts, tools and components. In addition, the SEMA Show provides attendees with educational seminars, product demonstrations, special events, networking opportunities and more.

The first SEMA Show was held in 1967 in the basement of the Dodger Stadium in Los Angeles, California before moving to the new Anaheim Stadium in 1974. In 1967 they had 98 manufacturers manning booths and an attendance of 3,000 people. In 1967 there were 5 cars on display, including a 1967 Ford GT40 in the Shelby America booth and a drag-race-prepped Dodge Dart. The early shows, held in Los Angeles and Anaheim, California, were exclusively card-table-and-masking-tape affairs, but by the early 1970s, sophisticated display and marketing techniques were visible throughout the show. At that time, a Show booth cost $375.00. The Show moved to a different location—the new and expansive Anaheim Convention Center (across from Disneyland). Booth sales and attendance kept increasing dramatically. The SEMA Show continued to cater to the needs of industry representatives rather than consumers and began to develop a reputation as a place where business was expected and completed. As part of the ’70s SEMA Shows, one of the must-attend events was Doris Herbert's Drag News party, which was topped only by the SEMA Awards Banquet.

In 1975, the featured entertainers for the Awards Banquet were April Stevens and Nino Tempo. In 1976 (the last SEMA Show to be held in Anaheim), the show was a sellout with 570 booths and, in fact, had to turn away a number of manufacturers due to lack of space. Over the next few years, the Show grew much larger and soon filled the Convention Center to capacity and was moved to Las Vegas in 1977. Las Vegas was chosen because it provided room for continued growth, dependable weather, big-name entertainment and a world-famous location.

In 1977, SEMA's Awards Banquet (run by Sheldon Konblett) was held at the Sands Hotel and featured Norm Crosby. Sheldon Konblett also developed the design for the SEMA trophies, which have come to symbolize product innovation and excellence in the industry.

In 1979, Nile Cornelison began plans for his Innovations Day seminars program, which has since become one of the major annual association programs. The following year, Innovations Day was a smashing success and featured Lee Iacocca as the keynote speaker. Never before had any activity held on the day prior to the Show's opening attracted anything near the more than 460 who attended. That same year, Willie Nelson was the featured entertainer for the SEMA Awards Banquet.

In 1983, the import parts section of the SEMA Show was added under the auspices of sister organization, Automotive International Association, thus changing the name to SEMA/AI Show. In 1984, there was a combined SEMA/AI/APAA Show in Las Vegas. The Industry Awards Banquet was held at the MGM Grand, and the entertainment was provided by The Platters and Gallagher. By all indications, the move to Las Vegas has been an overwhelming success. In 1986, Car and Driver magazine noted that the Show was a “...prime opportunity to monitor the West Coast car culture without breathing the smog or fighting the freeways.” That same year, Jay Leno made his first appearance on stage at the SEMA Show Industry Awards Banquet.

In 1990, the onsite registration fee was increased to $20. All exhibitors are eligible to submit an entry into the New Products Showcase at no cost. In 1992, the SEMA/AI Show and the Automotive Service Industry, Motor & Equipment Manufacturers Association and Automotive Parts & Accessories Association (ASIA/MEMA/APAA Show—formerly the Big I/APAA Show) came together to form Automotive Aftermarket Industry Week (AAIW) in Las Vegas. The two shows together boasted in excess of 1.6 million square feet of exhibits.

In 1997, the National Tire Dealers & Retreaters (NTDRA) trade show was combined with the SEMA Show. Affiliating the 77-year-old NTDRA trade show with the SEMA portion of AAIW provided benefits to both sides. In the same year, Goodyear sponsored the first SEMA-NTDRA “Racers’ Night Out” at the Las Vegas Motor Speedway.

In 1998, the SEMA Show broke the 500,000-foot mark with 502,912 net square feet of rented space. Each year since then, the Show has set new records of some sort. It now occupies more than one million net square feet, draws more than 3,000 media, and has a buyer attendance in excess of 60,000. The SEMA Show now routinely brings together more than 2,300 exhibitors, occupying in excess of 11,000 booths. Total attendance at the Show now tops 150,000 manufacturers, buyers and other industry representatives, making contacts and doing business.

=== 1967 ===
- Dodge Dart Drag Race Car
- Ford GT40
- 1967 Dodge Adventurer D100 Truck Parts

=== 1984 ===
- Chevrolet Camaro GTZ Concept
- Pontiac Fiero by IRM

=== 1985 ===
- Buick Wildcat Concept

=== 1987 ===
- Ford Bronco II Concept

=== 1990 ===
- Chevrolet Camaro B&M Neon

=== 1991 ===
- Chevrolet Camaro LT5 Concept
- Geo Tracker "Boom Box" Concept
- Geo "Zonker" Metro

=== 1992 ===
- Boyd Coddington Chezoom
- Chevrolet Highlander Concept
- Chevrolet Impala SS Concept

=== 1993 ===
- Callaway C8 SuperNatural
- Chevrolet Camaro by BBS Wheels
- Chevrolet Camaro by RK Sport
- Chevrolet Camaro by Kobel
- Chevrolet Camaro by Pro Cut
- Chevrolet Camaro by Paxton

=== 1994 ===
- Chevrolet Blazer ZR2 Concept
- Chevrolet Cavalier Touring Sedan Concept
- Chevrolet NASCAR Super Truck
- Chevrolet Monte Carlo Sport Concept
- Chevrolet Lumina Super Sport Concept
- Chevrolet Ram Van Concept
- Chevrolet S-Series Wings Concept
- Geo Tracker Kalahari Concept
- Geo Tracker Outbacker Concept

=== 1995 ===
- Chevrolet Cavalier Spyder Concept
- Chevrolet Cavalier Z24
- Chevrolet Caprice "Fire & Rescue"
- Chevrolet Tahoe SS Concept
- Chevrolet Monte Carlo SS Concept
- Chevrolet Monte Car-Low "Lead Sled" Concept
- Chevrolet S-10 Elongate Concept
- Chevrolet S-10 Hugger Concept
- Dodge Ram VTS Concept
- Dodge Viper GTS Indy 500 Pace Car
- Ford Ranger Splash MATCO

=== 1996 ===
- Chevrolet 2500 by Innovative Truck Storage Inc.
- Chevrolet Impala SS "Binford Hot Rod"
- Chevrolet Tahoe Police Package Concept
- Chevrolet Tahoe SS Concept
- Chevrolet Camaro F1
- Chevrolet Camaro Z28 SS
- Chevrolet C-1500 Extended Cab
- Chevrolet C-1500 Regular Cab NASCAR Supertruck Series Pace Truck
- Chevrolet Silverado SuperWIDE Concept
- Chevrolet Camaro Z28 "30th Anniversary Edition"
- Chevrolet Camaro Z28 Convertible "30th Anniversary Edition"
- Chevrolet ZL2-Plus 4 Concept
- Chevrolet Cavalier ZR-24 MOAB Concept
- Dodge Dakota Sidewinder Concept
- Dodge T-Rex 6x6 Concept Truck
- Ford F-150 XP Concept Truck
- Ford Ranger SuperCab Concept
- Ford Ranger Sandcourt Concept
- Jeep Wrangler Tabasco Concept
- Jeep Wrangler Ultimate Rescue Concept
- Geo Rad Tracker Concept
- Hennessey Venom 600 GTS
- Nissan 240SX by HKS
- Mazda RX-7 A&L Racing
- Mitsubishi Eclipse by GReddy
- Pontiac Firebird by Lingenfelter
- Saleen Speedster
- Saleen Ford Mustang SR
- Shelby Series 1

=== 1997 ===
- Chevrolet S-10 Xtreme Force Concept
- Chevrolet Cavalier Z24 Technic Concept
- Chevrolet Corvette Convertible Indy 500 Pace Car
- Chevrolet Malibu Sport Concept
- Chevrolet Ski Van Concept
- Dodge Durango Super Pursuit
- Dodge Sidewinder
- Ford F-150 Super Duty
- Ford F-250 Super Duty
- Ford F-350 Super Duty
- Ford F-450 Super Duty
- Ford F-550 Super Duty
- Ford "Baja Baby" Ranger Concept
- Ford Mustang GT Shinoda Boss
- Ford Mustang Super Stallion Concept
- Mitsubishi Eclipse GSX SCC Magazine

=== 1998 ===
- Buick Riviera Northstar Concept
- Chevrolet AdVenture Concept
- Chevrolet Blazer ZR-2 Shark Edition Convertible Concept
- Chevrolet Corvette C5R
- Chevrolet Camaro LS1 Dragster Super Performance
- Chevrolet Express Tool Time Van Concept
- Chevrolet Lone Star Suburban
- Chevrolet Silverado Greg Norman Hot Rod Concept
- Chevrolet Silverado Pace Truck
- Chevrolet Silverado Race Truck
- Chevrolet Silverado SS Concept
- Chevrolet Silverado Tonka Truck Concept
- Chevrolet Tahoe Limited
- Chevrolet Tahoe Police Package
- Chevrolet Tahoe Z71
- Chevrolet Tracker ZR-2 Concept
- Chevrolet Sterling Silverado Concept
- Chevrolet Venture Taxi
- Chrysler Sebring Convertible Allure Show Car
- Chrysler Sebring Convertible JXTRA Show Car
- Chrysler Sebring Convertible Seamist Show Car
- Chrysler Sebring Convertible Tech 27 Show Car
- Dodge Durango SP360 Carroll Shelby Edition
- Ford Expedition Himalaya Concept
- Ford Mustang Cobra SVT
- Ford Mustang Roush
- Ford F-650 Super Crewzer Concept
- Ford Ranger Duraliner
- Ford Taurus Rage Concept
- Ford TekSport Windstar Concept
- GMC Jimmy Typhoon II Concept
- GMC Sierra Modern Nostalgia 1-Les Jarvis Concept
- Honda CR-V King Motorsports
- Mercedes-Benz Millennium GLK Concept
- Mercury Cougar Eliminator Concept
- Mercury Cougar S Concept
- Mercury Gametime Villager Concept
- Mercury Marauder Concept
- Oldsmobile Silhouette Premiere
- Pontiac Grand Am SC/T Concept
- Toyota Supra TRD 2JZ

=== 1999 ===
- Buick Park Avenue "California"
- Chevrolet S-10 Baja Crew Cab Show Car
- Chevrolet S-10 V8 Xtreme Concept
- Chevrolet Blazer Xtreme Concept
- Chevrolet Cavalier Z24 Sedan
- Chevrolet Corvette C5 Cavallo GT
- Chevrolet Camaro ZL1 Concept
- Chevrolet Tandem 2000 Concept
- Chevrolet Tracker
- Chevrolet Tracker ZR2
- Chevrolet Silverado Extended Cab
- Chevrolet Suburban Z71 Concept
- Chrysler 300M Special Concept
- Chrysler GT Cruiser Concept
- Dodge Dakarta Concept
- Dodge Dakota Quad Cab "Discover" Concept
- Dodge Dakota SLT Quad Cab "Site Commander" Concept
- Dodge Dakota Quad Cab Fire Rescue Project Vehicle
- Dodge Dakota Quad Cab TSW Concept
- Dodge Dakota Super Extreme Concept
- Dodge Intrepid R/T
- Dodge Neon SRT Concept
- Ford Arctic Explorer Sport Trac Concept
- Ford Desert Excursion Concept
- Ford Excursion "Project Big Kahuna"
- Ford Expedition Eddie Bauer Edition "Desert Dancer"
- Ford Expedition SeaScape Concept
- Ford Galaxy Communicator
- Ford Focus R
- Ford Focus Woody Surfing Wagon
- Ford F-150 Rooster
- Ford F-150 Scuba SuperCrew Concept
- Ford F-150 Stillen
- Ford Mustang FR500 Concept
- Ford Ranger Thrillseeker
- Ford SVT Mustang Cobra R
- Ford Taurus Supercharged Concept
- Ford Trailmasters Explorer
- GMC Sierra Professional Concept
- Jeep Cherokee Africana Concept
- Mazda MX-5 Miata Mono-Posto Concept
- Mazda Protege StreetCar Concept
- Mercury Cougar S
- Navistar Turtle V
- Lincoln LS Special Concept
- Oldsmobile Aurora Indy 500 Pace Car
- Oldsmobile Alero OSV Concept
- Oldsmobile Intrigue OSV Concept
- Oldsmobile Silhouette OSV Concept
- Plymouth Howler Concept
- Plymouth Prowler Woodward Edition
- Pontiac Grand Prix GTP
- Toyota Tacoma Stepside

=== 2000 ===
- Acura CL Modified
- Acura MDX Modified
- Buick Park Avenue Ultra VIP Concept
- Buick Regal GNX Show Car
- Chevrolet 302 Camaro Concept
- Chevrolet Avalanche Base Camp Concept
- Chevrolet Bruin Fleet-Side Concept
- Chevrolet Silverado Coolside II Concept
- Chevrolet Silverado SS Concept
- Chevrolet Silverado HD 4X4 Crew Cab Fox Cycle Truck
- Chevrolet Suburban R/T Concept
- Chevrolet Tahoe Limited Concept
- Chevrolet Tahoe Z71 Concept
- Chevrolet S-10 T-Top Xtreme Concept
- Chevrolet S-10 ZZ4.3 Xtreme Concept
- Chrysler Brian Setzer Vavoom! Cruiser
- Chrysler PT Cruiser Delivery Sedan
- Chrysler Hot Rod PT Cruiser
- Chrysler "Futuristic Woody" PT Cruiser
- Chrysler Indian Cruiser
- Chrysler Paddy Cruiser
- Chrysler Rescue Cruiser
- Chrysler PT Rodder
- Chrysler PT Teaser
- Chrysler P Thompson River Cruiser
- Chrysler PT Cruiser Recaro Edition
- Chrysler PT Bruizer Concept
- Chrysler 300М Gran Turismo
- Dodge Neon SRT-4 Concept
- Dodge Hot Rod Stratus ("StatusFear")
- Dodge Stratus Sport Coupe Touring Classe Concept
- Dodge Ram HEMI Rumble Bee
- GMC Trucks TV Project Sierra
- GMC Sierra "Sportsider" AWD
- GMC Millennium Sierra
- GMC Sierra Specialty Trim
- GMC Sierra Victory Express
- GMC Downtown Sierra
- GMC Sierra Steelrunner
- GMC Sierra "Street Scene Special"
- GMC Sierra Inferno
- GMC Sierra Tremor
- GMC Sierra Cx Crew Cab Concept
- GMC Sonoma Recon Concept
- GMC Yukon XL Apex SUV
- Ford Crown Victoria Blackhawk Concept
- Ford SVT F-150 Lightning
- Ford Explorer Sport Trac Hot Rod
- Ford Explorer Sport Trac Extremist
- Ford Explorer "Baja 2000 Edition" Sport Trac
- Ford Line-X Explorer Sport Trac
- Ford Sport Trac "Urban Assault" Explorer
- Ford Borla's XSV Sport Trac
- Ford Bushwacker's Sport Trac
- Ford Escape XLT Sport
- Ford Great Escape
- Ford Focus FCV
- Ford Focus Flexus
- Ford Focus FR200 Concept
- Ford Focus "Made In Detroit" Concept
- Ford "Shaker" Mustang by Classic Design Concepts
- Ford Urban Explorer Concept
- Jeep Cherokee 8" Rock Ready Rescue by Skyjacker
- Jeep Grand Cherokee Kirkwood Edition (Jeep Colorado Concept)
- Jeep Grand Escape Limited
- Jeep Jamboree Wrangler TJ
- Jeep LWB 112 Wrangler
- Honda S2000 Modified
- Honda RASR Civic
- Hyundai Elantra GT by APC
- Hyundai Santa Fe by Today's SUV Magazine
- Hyundai Tiburon by Rimmer Performance
- Hyundai Tiburon Rally Car by Libra Racing
- Hyundai XG300 by Performance West
- Infiniti Q45 by Stillen
- Isuzu Amigo Bob Land Race Truck
- Isuzu ARB's Project Rodeo Sport
- Mazda Miata MM Concept
- Mazda Tribute MM Concept
- Mercury Cougar by Wings West
- Mitsubishi Montero Modified
- Nissan Frontier Crew Cab by Rockford Fosgate
- Nissan Frontier Crew Cab by Popular Mechanics Magazine
- Nissan Frontier Crew Cab by Street Trucks Magazine
- Nissan Frontier Crew Cab by Nissan Motorsports
- Nissan Frontier Crew Cab by Stockland Company
- Nissan Frontier Crew Cab by ArmorThane Coatings
- Nissan Frontier Crew Cab by AMP Research
- Nissan Frontier Crew Cab by Snugtop
- Nissan Frontier Crew Cab by JAC Products
- Nissan Xterra by Overlander Outfitters
- Nissan Xterra by Delta Lighting
- Nissan Xterra by GT Styling
- Nissan Xterra by HKS
- Nissan Xterra by American Racing Custom Wheels
- Nissan Xterra by Stillen
- Nissan Maxima SE by Eibach
- Nissan Maxima SE by Turbo & High-Tech Performance Magazine
- Nissan Maxima SE by MotoRex
- Nissan Maxima SE by Stillen
- Nissan Maxima SE PPG Pace Car
- Nissan Pathfinder by HKS
- Nissan Pathfinder by Hobrecht
- Lexus L-Tuned IS300 by TDR
- Oldsmobile Intrigue Saturday Night Cruiser Concept
- Pontiac Aztek Salsa
- Pontiac Bonneville SSEi Salt Flats Stock Class
- Pontiac Grand Prix G8 Concept
- Pontiac Grand Am SC/T Roadster Concept
- Pontiac Firebird Hurst Hauler Concept
- Pontiac Firebird MMS 421 Concept
- Pontiac Firebird Rytek Projektz Tranzam Concept
- Pontiac Montana Mobility Van
- Pontiac Montana Sunburst
- Pontiac Sunfire Youth Performance
- Pontiac Trans Am Bird of Prey Speedster
- Toyota bB Concept
- Toyota Camry Solara
- Toyota TRD Celica
- Toyota TRD MR2 Spyder
- Toyota TRD Tundra S/C Demos
- Toyota Tundra Moor Products
- Saab 9-3 Viggen Pikes Peak
- Saturn SC2 Concept
- Saturn LST Concept

=== 2001 ===
- Acura MDX Concept
- Acura RSX Concept
- Acura RSX Type-S CART Pace Car
- Acura RSX Type-S RO_JA Racing Pro Drag
- Acura RSX Type-S HKS Turbocharged
- Buick Rendezvous Mobility Concept
- Buick Rendezvous Tour Concept
- Cadillac Escalade Twin Turbo Concept
- Chevrolet Avalanche SS Eaton Torque Controls Products
- Chevrolet Cavalier 155 Maui Concept
- Chevrolet Cavalier 220 Sport Turbo Concept
- Chevrolet Cavalier 425 Drag Concept
- Chevrolet Cavalier 263 Super Sport Concept
- Chevrolet Cavalier Z24R Concept
- Chevrolet Corvette Coupe "Tiger Shark" Concept
- Chevrolet Malibu Cruiser Concept
- Chevrolet Monte Carlo Earnhardt Edition
- Chevrolet Silverado Pace Truck
- Chevrolet TrailBlazer Goin' Mobile
- Chrysler 300M Special
- Chrysler Lifestyle Vehicle Decoma PT/10
- Chrysler Pacifica Royal
- Chrysler Prowler Hard Top Concept
- Dodge Ram Rod Concept by Performance West
- Dodge Ram CGS Motorsports Sport Truck
- Dodge Ram Hunting Magazine Waterfowler Pursuit
- Dodge Ram Kenne Bell RH/R
- Ford 1956 Crown Victoria
- Ford A Whole New Focus
- Ford Boundless Escape
- Ford Eric Clapton's F-150
- Ford Explorer Extreme Luxury Sport Utility Vehicle
- Ford F-150 Wet n' Wild Supercrew
- Ford Focus NV
- Ford Harley-Davidson F-150 SuperCrew
- Ford Explorer Woodie
- Ford Mustang Titanium
- Ford Mustang Cobra Granatelli Motorsports/Summit Racing
- Ford Today and Tomorrow's Teenager Explorer Sport
- Ford Super Duty Power On Ice Concept
- Ford Ranger Back Country "Blast" Concept
- GMC C-Series Rollback Pro
- GMC Envoy Max
- GMC Envoy Pet Pro Concept
- GMC Savana Trekker Concept
- GMC Sierra Pro Plus Concept
- GMC Sonoma ZR-5 Concept
- GMC Yukon 4Sight Concept
- Honda Accessories S2000
- Honda Accessories Civic Si
- Honda Civic Si Adam Saruwatari
- Honda Civic Coupe Concept
- Honda Civic JUN Super Lemon
- Hot Wheels Twin Mill 1:1
- Hummer H1 Alpha Vision Concept
- Hyundai Tiburon GT V6 by APC
- Hyundai Tiburon GT V6 by Hyundai Motor America
- Hyundai Santa Fe Rick's Kustoms "Alter Ego"
- Hyundai Santa Fe by Algonquin
- Hyundai Santa Fe by Mongoose Race Team
- Hyundai LZ 450 Concept
- Isuzu Axiom XSF Concept
- Isuzu ARB Project Compass Trooper
- Isuzu Clipper Blue Rodeo
- Jaguar XKR-R Performance Prototype
- Jeep Cherokee Pro Comp
- Jeep Grand Cherokee Overland
- Jeep Liberty "Patriot" Concept
- Jeep Liberty American Edition Concept
- Jeep Liberty "Freedom"
- Jeep Liberty "Indian Woodie"
- Jeep Liberty Mopar
- Jeep Wrangler American Racing Spooner Tuner Concept
- Jeep Wrangler Arb
- Jeep Wrangler Hi-Lift
- Jeep Wrangler Mickey Thompson
- Jeep Wrangler Tye Dye Concept
- Jeep Wrangler Skyjacker Rock Ready
- Jeep Wrangler Ramsey
- Jeep Wrangler Warn Industries
- Jeep Wrangler "Mountain Biker"
- Land Rover Discovery Kalahari Concept
- Land Rover Freelander Supercharged-Performance Callaway
- Lincoln Blackwood "Pegasus"
- Lincoln LS "Sport Edition"
- Mazda Miata Zoomster Concept
- Mazda Protegé5 Troy Lee Designs
- Mercury Marauder
- Mercury Mountaineer Silver Streak
- Mitsubishi Lancer OZ Rally Edition
- Nissan Altima Stillen
- Nissan Frontier Axis Wheels
- Nissan Frontier Art Schmitt Racing
- Nissan NISMO SE-R Concept
- Nissan NISMO Skyline GT-R
- Nissan Jim Wolf Technologies Sentra SE-Turbo
- Nissan NCTNA Project X Xterra
- Nissan Rockford Fosgate Xterra
- Oldsmobile Intrigue 442 Concept
- Pontiac Aztek SRV Concept
- Pontiac Grand Am Hot Wheels Concept
- Pontiac Grand Prix GP40 Concept
- Pontiac Firebird Raptor Concept
- Pontiac Sunfire HO 2.4 Concept
- Pontiac Vibe FX
- Pontiac Vibe GT-R Concept
- Saturn SC2 Turbo Concept
- Saturn SCX Concept
- Toyota TRD Ivan Stewart Signature Edition Tundra
- Toyota Matrix XRS
- Volvo V70 Cross Country Wagon Emphasizing "Rugged Outdoor Versatility"
- Volvo V40 Wagon 1.9T Inspired Dynamism Concept

=== 2002 ===
- Acura CL Type-S Concept
- Acura RSX Type-S Factory Performance Package
- Acura RSX Type-S SCCA Real Time Racing Team
- Cadillac CTSm Concept
- Cadillac DTS Icon Concept
- Cadillac Escalade ESV Platinum Concept
- Cadillac Escalade EXTm Concept
- Chevrolet Camaro Z28 Dragster
- Chevrolet Cavalier 2.2 Turbo Sport Coupe Concept
- Chevrolet Cavalier NHRA Dragster
- Chevrolet Cavalier Z-24 Supercharged Concept
- Chevrolet Cavalier Attitude
- Chevrolet Corvette Z06
- Chevrolet Corvette White Shark Concept
- Chevrolet Express Ultimate Ski Van Concept
- Chevrolet Kodiak Pickup Concept
- Chevrolet Lucchese Suburban Concept
- Chevrolet Monte Carlo Jeff Gordon Edition
- Chevrolet Silverado Extended Cab SS
- Chevrolet Silverado Regular Cab SS
- Chevrolet Silverado Craftsman Pace Truck Concept
- Chevrolet Silverado SST Concept
- Chevrolet Silverado 1500HD Concept by Oakley MX
- Chevrolet Tahoe SS Concept
- Chevrolet Trailblazer SS Concept
- Chevrolet Venture MEV Concept
- Chevrolet Venture Mobility Concept
- Chrysler 300M Special So-Cal Speed Shop
- Chrysler PT Cruiser Big Sky Concept
- Chrysler PT Cruiser Turbo Kenne Bell
- Chrysler PT Super Cruiser Concept
- Chrysler Sebring Convertible Luxury Tuner Concept by Racing Sports Akimoto
- Dodge Charger 'The Fast And The Furious'
- Dodge Grand Caravan Extreme Concept by APC
- Dodge Gifford RAM Recon
- Dodge Neon R/T Compact Performance Concept by Wings West
- Dodge Ram 1500
- Dodge Ram 1500 Handicap Accessible Steve Bucaro
- Dodge Ram 2500 HEMI Kenne-Bell Concept
- Dodge Ram 3500 Cannonball Express Concept by Performance West
- Dodge Stratus Turbo Concept
- GMC Envoy XL Project Pro Concept
- GMC Savana Install Pro Concept
- GMC Sierra Landscaper Pro Concept
- GMC Yukon XL Outdoor Living Pro Concept
- Kia Rio Cinco Swim Concept
- Kia Sorento Surf Concept
- 1970 Big Oly Ford Bronco
- Ford No Fear NF-155
- Ford F-150 Himalaya II Concept
- Ford F-150 Eric Clapton Super Street
- Ford F-350 TRENZ Ultimate Mountain Climber
- Ford FR100 Concept
- Ford Competition Orange SVT Focus
- Ford Escape DG Motorsports
- Ford New Dimension Excursion Concept
- Ford Hot Wheels Focus Concept
- Ford Focus Wagon FT230
- Ford SVT Focus European Appearance Package
- Ford SVT Mustang Cobra 10th Anniversary Edition
- Ford Thunderbird by Chip Foose
- Honda AEM Civic Coupe
- Honda Accord Coupe Concept
- Honda Accord Coupe Factory Performance
- Honda Civic Si Concept
- Honda Mugen Civic Si
- Honda Pro Drag Civic Si
- Hummer H2 Upscale Performance Concept
- Hyundai ALT Wheels Tiburon
- Hyundai APC Tiburon
- Hyundai A'PEXi Tiburon
- Hyundai Eibach Tiburon
- Hyundai HKS Tiburon
- Hyundai Import Racer Project Tiburon
- Hyundai Injen Tiburon
- Hyundai Modern Image Tiburon
- Hyundai Motegi Tiburon
- Hyundai Rick Dore XG350
- Hyundai Street Concepts Tiburon
- Hyundai Troy Lee Sonata
- Hyundai Tiburon GT Razzi
- Hyundai Tiburon GT Shark Racing
- Jaguar X-Type Racing Concept
- Jeep Liberty "Tactical Transport" by Performance West
- Jeep Liberty "Concept KJ" by Mopar Accessories/Decoma SVE
- Jeep Wrangler "Surf & Turf" by Performance West
- Jeep Wrangler Scrambler "Brute" by AEV
- Land Rover Freelander G4 Challenge
- Lincoln Navigator Sean John
- Mazda 6 Troy Lee
- Mazda MazdaSpeed Protege
- Mitsubishi STAGE 1 Eclipse
- Nissan Axis Sport Tuning 350Z Concept
- Nissan NISMO 350Z Concept Le Mans Sunset
- Nissan NISMO 350Z Concept Silverstone
- Nissan Stillen Altima Concept
- Nissan Street Concepts Sentra SE-R
- Nissan SE-R Spec V Speed Channel World Challenge Race Car
- Pontiac Bonneville GXP Show Car
- Pontiac Grand Am GXP Show Car
- Pontiac Grand Prix GXP Show Car
- Pontiac Sunfire American Tuner Show Car
- Pontiac Sunfire GXP Show Car
- Pontiac Sunfire NHRA Dragster
- Pontiac Vibe GXP Show Car
- Pontiac Vibe SPO Supercharged Show Car
- Saturn ION-EFX Concept
- Saturn ION-Tour Concept
- Saturn VUE Active Expression Limited Edition
- Scion xB Motegi
- Scion xB Paisley
- Scion xB Stewart Concept
- Suzuki/MA Audio Aerio SX Sport Concept

=== 2003 ===
- Acura NSX by Duke Tubtim
- Acura TL A-Spec Concept
- Acura TSX A-Spec Concept
- Skunk2 Acura RSX Racecar
- Buick Rainier TW Edition Concept
- Buick Rendezvous Ultra TW Edition Concept
- Jay Leno Buick Roadmaster
- Cadillac DeVille Armored Edition
- Cadillac SRX Black Diamond Concept
- Cadillac CTS Sport Concept
- Cadillac Escalade ESV Executive Edition Concept
- Chevrolet Aveo Xtreme Concept
- Chevrolet Cavalier Partner Vehicle
- Chevrolet Colorado Extreme Concept
- Chevrolet Colorado Z71 Vision Concept
- Chevrolet Equinox Xtreme Concept
- Chevrolet Malibu Xtreme Concept
- Chevrolet Police Tahoe
- Chevrolet Silverado Z71 Crew Cab 4x4 Concept
- Chevrolet Silverado Z71 Extended 4x4 Concept
- Chevrolet Silverado Crew Cab Cargo/Troop Carrier
- Chevrolet TrailBlazer Z71 4x4 Concept
- Chevrolet Suburban Partner Vehicle
- Chevrolet Super Stepside Custom Concept
- Chrysler California Kid Prowler
- Chrysler Pacifica Santa Monica Concept
- Chrysler PT Coupe Concept
- Chrysler Pteazer Roadster Concept
- Chrysler Sebring Special Concept
- Dodge Ram High Output 1500 Sportside
- Dodge Neon SRT-4 Extreme Concept
- Dodge Viper SRT-10 Carbon Concept
- Ford Focus Performance 5-door Concept
- Ford Focus 3-door Performance Concept
- Ford Focus Roush
- Ford Focus RS8 Performance Project
- Ford Ranger Performance Concept
- Ford FR100 Panel Truck Concept
- Ford Mustang Fastback Concept
- Ford Mustang Mach 1 Racer by MRT
- Ford F-150 American Muscle by Street Scene
- Ford F-150 Big Sky by Performance West
- Ford F-150 Bonspeed Banshee
- Ford F-150 Canyon Crawler by X-Treme Toys
- Ford F-150 Everest by Prefix
- Ford F-150 by Foose Design
- Ford F-150 LSC (Low, Smooth, Cool) by Air Ri
- Ford F-150 Fast and Ferocious by Wings West
- Ford Iron Man F-150 by DeBerti Designs
- Ford Roush F-150
- Ford F-150 SCOUT by BFS Mobility
- Ford Shine F-150 by So-Cal Speed Shop
- Ford F-150 Stainless by Classic Design Concepts
- Ford Super Wagons F-150 by Hulst Customs
- GMC Canyon Crew Cab AT4 Concept
- GMC Envoy XUV AT4 Concept
- GMC Sierra Crew Cab Short Box AT4 Concept
- GMC Sierra Partner Vehicle
- GMC Yukon AT4 Concept
- Honda AEM/DriverFX.com Civic
- Honda Element Concept
- Honda Civic Coupe Factory Performance Package
- Honda S2000 King Motorsports Mugen
- Hyundai Elantra GT Wicked Sedan by American Pro
- Hyundai Santa Fe by K-Daddyz Kustomz
- Hyundai Santa Fe by Street Concepts
- Hyundai Santa Fe by Troy Lee Designs
- Hyundai Santa Fe by Modern ImageSignworks
- Hyundai Sonata LX by Rick Dore Kustoms
- Hyundai Tiburon by AME Marketing
- Hyundai Tiburon by American Products Company
- Hyundai Tiburon by Modern ImageSignworks
- Hyundai Tiburon by Street Concepts
- Hyundai XG350L by J & A Autosport
- Hummer H1
- Hummer H2 SUT Dirt Sports Concept
- Jeep Liberator CRD Diesel Concept
- Land Rover Defender 110 CKD
- Lexus Blitz SC430
- Lexus IS 430 Project Concept
- Lincoln Kenny Brown Aviator by Kenny Brown Perf
- Lincoln LS by Rick Dore Kustoms
- Lincoln Navigator Blackhawk by Works Power
- Lincoln Town Car by So-Cal Speed Shop
- Mazda Mazdaspeed MX-5 Miata
- Mazda Mazdaspeed RX-8
- Mazda MX-5 Miata by DG Motorsports
- Mercury Marauder "Street Stalker" by Paul?s Hig
- Mercury XR Mountaineer by LA West
- Mitsubishi Eclipse Racecar by Automotive Designs
- Mitsubishi Endeavor by Ballistic Unlimited
- Mitsubishi Endeavor by Classic Soft Trim
- Mitsubishi Endeavor by Import Access.net
- Mitsubishi Lancer Evolution RS
- Mitsubishi Lancer Evolution by Bozz Performance
- Mitsubishi Lancer Evolution by Toda Racing
- Mitsubishi Road Race Evolution Project Car
- Mitsubishi Spyder GTS by R-1 Racing Sports
- Mitsubishi Street Concepts Evolution
- Mitsubishi Yokohama Advan Evolution
- Nissan Altima by Fesler
- Nissan Maxima by Kenny's Garage
- Nissan Maxima by Stillen
- Nissan Maxima by Street Concepts
- Nissan Murano by Custom Shop
- Nissan Pathfinder Armada by Axis Sport Tuning
- Nissan Pathfinder Armada by Creative Development
- Nissan Pathfinder Armada by Modern Image
- Nissan Pathfinder Armada by Rytec
- Nissan NISMO 350Z
- Nissan NISMO Altima
- Nissan NISMO Sentra SE-R
- Nissan Quest by Kenny's Garage
- Nissan Sentra Spec V by American Products Company
- Nissan Titan by Troy Lee
- Nissan Titan by CST
- Nissan Titan by Street Concepts
- Nissan Xterra by Modern Image
- Pontiac American Tuner Sunfire
- Pontiac Grand Am Autocross Concept
- Pontiac Grand Prix Autocross Concept
- Pontiac GTO Autocross Concept
- Pontiac Sunfire Autocross Concept
- Pontiac Vibe Autocross Concept
- Saturn ION Red Line Quad Coupe by SO-CAL Speed Shop
- Saturn VUE Red Line Street Play Concept
- Scion xA by L.J. Garcia
- Subaru Impreza WRX by Easy Street Motorsports
- Toyota Corolla XR-S
- Toyota Supercharged TRD Matrix

=== 2004 ===
- Mercury Mariner "Urban Edition" Concept
- Pontiac GXP concept

=== 2005 ===
- Cadillac CTS-V "European Killer"
- 1968 Chevrolet Camaro Convertible Green Ice
- 1969 Chevrolet Camaro "The Great American Supercar"
- 1971 Chevrolet Chevelle SS Detroit Locker LSS2
- Chevrolet Cobalt SS Import Killer
- Chevrolet Colorado Yamahauler
- Chevrolet Corvette Stuf Corvette
- Chevrolet HHR “Heartbeat Hot Rod”
- Chevrolet Silverado 3500 4x4 Dually Crew Cab "Born To Tow"
- Chrysler KICKER Crossfire
- Dodge Cummins 2500 4x4 Tyler Walker Race Truck
- 1970 Dodge Dart Swinger "The Poison Dart"
- 1971 Dodge Challenger Big Dawg
- Ford F-150 Water Search And Rescue
- Ford F-150 XLT Regular Cab Red Thunder
- Ford F-250 Crew Cab Joyride
- Ford F-250 4x4 Crew Cab Short Bed The “GC” (General Contractor)
- Ford Focus ZX3 Little Red
- Ford E350 Van Sportsmobile's Ultimate Adventure Vehicle
- Ford Explorer Northern Edition
- Ford Mustang California Dreamer
- Ford Mustang GT Convertible “California Dream”
- Ford Mustang Woodward GT
- Ford Ranger STX Zero Gravity-Go After It!
- GMC Grand Canyon
- GMC Sierra Crew Cab Artic Stealth
- Hummer H1 Raptor 2001
- Hummer H2 Duramax Conversion
- Hyundai Tiburon Red Flyer by Street Concepts
- Infiniti G35 Racing Revolution
- Infiniti M35 xM
- Jeep Buggy Custom
- Jeep Sahara State-Of-The-Art TJ
- Jeep Wrangler Rubicon Project Lock It Up
- Troy Lee Designs MX-5
- Nissan 350Z Top Gun Kit
- Nissan Frontier Crew Cab 4WD Impulse Beach Breaker Watch
- Nissan Rock'd Frontier
- Pontiac G6 Afterburn
- Pontiac Solstice Weekend Club Racer concept
- Scion xB “TWINS”
- Subaru WRX PERRIN H6 STI
- Toyota Tacoma 2WD PreRunner
- Toyota Tacoma Smittybilt Rock Crawler
- Volkswagen Phaeton “Signature Series”

=== 2006 ===
- Chevrolet HHR Panel
- Ford F-150 FX2 Sport Extreme
- Ford F-150 by DeBerti Designs
- Ford F-150 by Bigfoot Offroad & Performance
- Ford F-250 Super Duty Project Work-A-HAUL IT
- Ford F-250 Super Duty by Fabtech
- Ford F-650 by DeBerti Designs
- Ford Fusion T5 by MRT
- Ford All-American Grand Touring Fusion
- Ford Edge by H&R Special Springs
- Ford Edge by 3dCarbon
- Ford Expedition Funkmaster Flex Concept
- Ford Explorer Sport "Muscle Truck" Barry's Speed Shop
- Ford Project Mustang GT by Ford Vehicle Personalization
- Ford Mustang GT Convertible by Stitchcraft Interiors Inc.
- Ford Mustang GT Drop Top by K-daddyz Kustomz
- 1970 Ford Mustang Boss 302
- Ford Mustang GT
- Ford Explorer Sport Trac Super Muscle Truck
- HR+R JDRF Charity Car
- Lincoln Navigator by Galpin Auto Sports
- Lincoln Navigator by Exotic Cars
- Lincoln MKX by 3dCarbon
- Lincoln MKZ by 3dCarbon
- Mitsubishi Evolander Concept
- Panoz Esperante GTLM
- Pontiac Solstice GXP-R concept
- Pontiac Solstice SD-290 race concept
- “RUSH” by Kirkham Motorsports
- Shelby GT500 40th Anniversary
- Shelby GT500 Dragster
- Suzuki XL-7 BaseCamp Concept
- Suzuki SX4 "Zuk" Concept
- Suzuki Thunderhill SX4 GodZUKI
- The Stallion Trike
- Volvo Caresto V-8 Speedster Concept
- Volvo C30 by Evolve
- Volvo C30 by IPD
- Volvo C30 HEICO Sportiv
- 1967 Volvo Amazon Kombi-69

=== 2007 ===
- Chevrolet HHR SS Panel concept
- Ford Mustang V6 Appearance Package
- Honda HF-S concept
- Toyota Matrix (second generation)

=== 2008 ===
- Chevrolet Camaro LS7
- Chevrolet Dale Earnhardt Jr. Camaro
- Chevrolet Camaro Black
- 2010 Chevrolet Camaro GS Racecar Concept
- Hyundai RMR "Art of Speed" Genesis Coupe 2.0t
- Mercedes-Benz GLK 350 Urban Whip
- Mercedes-Benz GLK 320 Brabus Widestar
- Mercedes-Benz GLK 350 RennTech Rally Racer
- Mercedes-Benz GLK 350 Four Corners Rock Crawler
- Pontiac Solstice GXP Coupe concept
- Subaru Forester XTI concept
- Subaru Forester Mountain Rescue Vehicle
- Volkswagen Jetta TDI Cup "Street" edition

=== 2009 ===
- Chevrolet Synergy Camaro
- Chevrolet Chroma Camaro
- Chevrolet Camaro Dusk
- Jay Leno Camaro
- Hyundai Genesis Coupe 2.0T R-Spec (2009–)
- Hyundai RM460 Genesis Coupe
- Ultima GTR powered by Mercury Marine

=== 2010 ===
- RMR Signature Edition Hyundai Equus
- DUB Edition Hyundai Equus
- Mazda MX-5 Super20

=== 2011 ===
- Hyundai RM500 Genesis Coupe
- ARK Performance Veloster
- PM Lifestyle Veloster
- Hyundai Re:Mix Music Veloster
- Hyundai Re:Mix Gaming Veloster
- RMR Global Rallycross Veloster
- Mazda Turbo2
- 3dCarbon Mazda2
- Mazda MX-5 Spyder
- Mazda MX-5 Super20 (refresh)

=== 2012 ===
- Dodge Charger Juiced
- Ford Mustang High Gear concept
- Cosworth Hyundai Genesis Racing Series
- Hyundai Genesis Coupe R-Spec by ARK
- Hyundai Veloster Velocity
- ARK Performance Veloster Alpine Edition
- Hyundai Veloster JP Edition
- Scion Carbon Stealth FR-S
- Scion FR-S GT
- Scion Minty FReSh
- Toyota Avalon TRD Edition
- Toyota Avalon HV Edition
- Toyota Avalon DUB Edition
- Toyota FJ-S Cruiser Concept

=== 2013 ===
- Acura RLX Urban Luxury Sedan by MAD Industries
- Acura RLX VIP Sedan by Evasive Motorsports
- Acura Street Performance ILX by MAD Industries
- AEV Ram 2500 Crew Cab Diesel Concept
- Chevrolet Camaro Spring Special Edition
- Chevrolet Camaro RRTP Customs Wide-Body
- Chevrolet Performance Camaro V6
- Chevrolet Performance Camaro V8
- Chevrolet COPO Camaro Concept
- Chevrolet Garage Camaro Concept
- Chevrolet Corvette Concept 7 Nowicki Autosport
- Chevrolet Corvette Stingray Convertible Atlantic Concept
- Chevrolet Corvette Stingray “Gran Turismo” Concept
- Chevrolet Corvette Stingray Pacific Concept
- Chevrolet Corvette Stingray LG Motorsports
- Chevrolet Corvette Stingray PFADT Race Engineering
- Chevrolet Malibu LTZ Concept
- Chevrolet Personalization Sonic Concept
- Chevrolet Performance Sonic RS Concept
- Chevrolet Performance Classic Truck Concept
- Chevrolet Signature Silverado by Brad Paisley Concept
- Chevrolet Silverado Black Ops Concept
- Chevrolet Silverado Cheyenne Concept
- Chevrolet Silverado Volunteer Firefighter Concept
- Chevrolet Silverado Z71 by Tony Stewart Concept
- Chevrolet Silverado HD Dually Tow Vehicle
- Chevrolet Suburban Half-Pipe Concept
- Chevrolet Ricky Carmichael All-Activity Sonic Concept
- Chevrolet Spark EV Tech Performance Concept
- Chevrolet Jeff Gordon SS Performance
- Chevrolet Tahoe Black Concept
- Chevrolet Tahoe Police Concept
- Chevrolet Urban Cool Impala Concept
- Chrysler 300 Convertible by JC Autostyles
- Chrysler 300S Mopar
- Chrysler 300S Phantom Black
- Dodge Challenger R/T Shaker
- Dodge Challenger Mopar ’14
- Dodge Challenger R/T "Scat Package"
- Dodge Charger R/T "Scat Package"
- Dodge Dart GT "Scat Package"
- Dodge Durango R/T Mopar
- Ferrari 458 Liberty Walk Wide-Body
- Fiat 500L Adventurer
- Ford-Riley Daytona Prototype
- 1956 Ford Thunderbird “Men of Honor”
- Ford F-100 'Snakebit'
- Ford F-150 by Fatal Clothing
- Ford F-150 by JR Consulting
- Ford F-150 by Skyjacker Suspensions
- Ford F-350 Super Duty by Cars by Kris
- Ford F-250 Super Duty by Hulst Customs
- Ford Bronco Build-a-Bronco Four-Door
- Ford Fiesta ST by 3dCarbon
- Ford Fiesta ST by Bojix Design
- Ford Fiesta ST by COBB Tuning and Tanner Foust Racing
- Ford Fiesta ST by Ice Nine Group
- Ford Fiesta ST by MRT
- Ford Focus ST by Cosworth
- Ford Focus ST by European Car Magazine
- Ford Focus ST by DRAGG
- Ford Focus ST by Green Filter USA
- Ford Focus ST by PM Lifestyle
- Ford Focus ST by UTI Gulf Racing
- Ford Fusion Titanium by DSO Eyewear
- Ford Fusion by Full-Race Motorsports
- Ford Mustang 50th Anniversary Golf Cart
- Ford Mustang by Hollywood Hot Rods
- Ford Mustang by Nitto Tire
- Ford Mustang by Vortech Superchargers
- Ford Mustang GT Project Yellow Jacket
- Ford Transit Connect by Blood & Grease
- Ford Transit Connect by CGS Motorsports
- Ford Transit Connect by eJudged.com
- Ford Transit Connect by Impulse Marketing & Media
- Ford Transit Connect by K-Daddyz Kustomz
- Ford Transit Connect by LGE-CTS Motorsports
- Ford Transit Connect by Mobsteel
- Ford Transit Connect by Pentech Automotive
- Ford Transit Connect by Strange Motion BMX
- Ford Transit Connect by Hot Wheels
- Forgiato Widebody C7 Corvette Stingray by TS Designs
- Giovanna Wheels Cadillac Escalade Golf Cart
- Honda Accord by MAD Industries
- Honda Civic Coupe
- Honda Civic Coupe HGA Package
- Honda Civic Si Coupe
- Honda Civic Si Coupe Race Car by HPD
- Honda Civic Si Sedan SEMA Project
- Honda Civic Street Performance Concept by HPD
- Honda Mean Mower
- Honda Odyssey by Bisimoto Engineering
- Hot Rod Conspiracy's Castrol Rocket
- Bisimoto Engineering Hyundai Genesis Coupe
- Hyundai Genesis Coupe JP Edition
- Hyundai Genesis Coupe Legato ARK Performance Concept
- Hyundai Veloster Turbo by Fox Marketing
- Hyundai Veloster Turbo Night Racer "Yellowcake" by EGR
- Jeep Cherokee Trail Carver
- Jeep Wrangler Copper Crawler Concept
- Kia Amped Soul
- Kia DJ Booth Soul
- Kia Music Memorabilia Soul
- Kia The Voice Soul
- Kia Vans Warped Tour Soul
- Lexus IS 250 by Andrew Atigehchi
- Lexus IS 250 AWD by Gordon Ting
- Lexus IS 250 F-Sport by Paul Tolson and Gabriel Escobedo
- Lexus IS 300 by Maricar Cortez
- Lexus IS 340 by Philip Chase
- Lexus IS 350 F-Sport by Seibon Carbon
- Lexus IS 350 F-Sport by Vossen Wheels
- Lexus IS 350 F-Sport by Rob Evans/ VIP Auto Salon
- Lexus LFA by Guy S. De Alwis
- Mazda Ceramic 6 Concept
- Mazda Club Sport 3 Concept
- Mazda Club Sport 6 Concept
- Mazda Vector 3 Concept
- Maximum D Monster Truck
- Mobsteel FedEx Delivery Truck
- Mopar 4700 Spec Class 4x4
- Porsche 911 RAUH-Welt
- Porsche Cayenne Turbo Black Bison by Wald International
- Ram 1500 Sun Chaser
- Ram Dually Case Work Truck
- Ring Brothers 1971 DeTomaso Pantera
- Scion GReddy Performance x Scion Racing Drift FR-S
- Scion Steve Aoki x Scion FR-S
- Scion FR-S Style J/Urban GT Sport Coupe
- Scion Bulletproof FR-S Concept One
- Scion Walter Franco L-DZ Concept
- Scion Young Tea Simpli-tC
- Scion Josh Croll WSD-tC
- Scion Strictly Business Cartel Scion xB
- Toyota 4Runner Ultimate Dream Ski
- Toyota Camry "CamRally"
- Toyota Corolla "Crusher"
- Toyota FJ Cruiser "Trail Teams Ultimate"
- Toyota RAV4 LifeTime Fitness
- Toyota SpongeBob Highlander: Tanked Edition
- Toyota Tacoma DC Shoes
- Toyota Tundra "Let's Go Moto"
- Toyota Tundra BBQ
- Vaydor
- Volkswagen Golf by H&R
- Volkswagen Jetta GLI Helios Special Edition Tribute by FMS Automotive
- Volkswagen Jetta Racer's Dream by FMS Automotive
- Jeep 4x4 TEXON

Concept on 4x4 by SG Concepts

=== 2014 ===
- Kia Smitten Soul EV
- Lexus IS 350 F Sport Deviantart Edition
- Scion FR-S T1

=== 2016 ===
- Toyota Yaris Legian
- Toyota Land Speed Cruiser
- Toyota Prius G

=== 2017 ===
- Chevrolet Camaro Hot Wheels Special Edition
- Luke Bryan Chevrolet Suburban concept

=== 2019 ===
- Hyundai Veloster Grappler concept

=== 2021 ===
- Ford F-100 Eluminator

=== 2022 ===
- Dodge Charger Daytona SRT
- Volkswagen Golf MK3 “Rallye”

== SEMA awards ==
Since 2003, the GT awards have been presented at the SEMA Auto Convention, and these include categories such as Best in Show, Best Hot Rod, and Best European Import. SEMA was also presented with the Grassroots Motorsports Editors' Choice Award in 2012.

== SEMA Action Network ==
Since 1997, the SEMA Action Network (SAN) has been a grassroots network for the automotive hobby. The SEMA Action Network is a partnership between enthusiasts, vehicle clubs and members of the specialty automotive parts industry in the United States and Canada who have collaborated to promote automotive hobby-friendly legislation and laws.

In the past, the SAN has:

- Promoted hot rod and custom vehicle (including kit cars and replicas) registration and titling laws in over 20 states
- Assisted in protecting classic vehicles waiting to be restored from confiscation on private property
- Defended illegal on-road nitrous oxide use with SAN model legislation
- Defended enthusiast's right to use loud aftermarket exhaust and emission control delete systems on public streets and highways
- Opposed “Cash for Clunkers” legislation
- Promoted legislation to lower taxes and fees for hobbyist vehicles
- Advocated to ensure public lands remain open to responsible on-road recreation

== See also ==
- Aftermarket exhaust parts
- Clean Air Act, Warranty Provisions (42 U.S.C. S 7541 (C) (3) (B))
- Magnuson-Moss Warranty Act
- SFI Foundation, formerly known as SEMA Foundation, Inc., an offspring from SEMA
