= Dodge Sidewinder =

1997 concept car

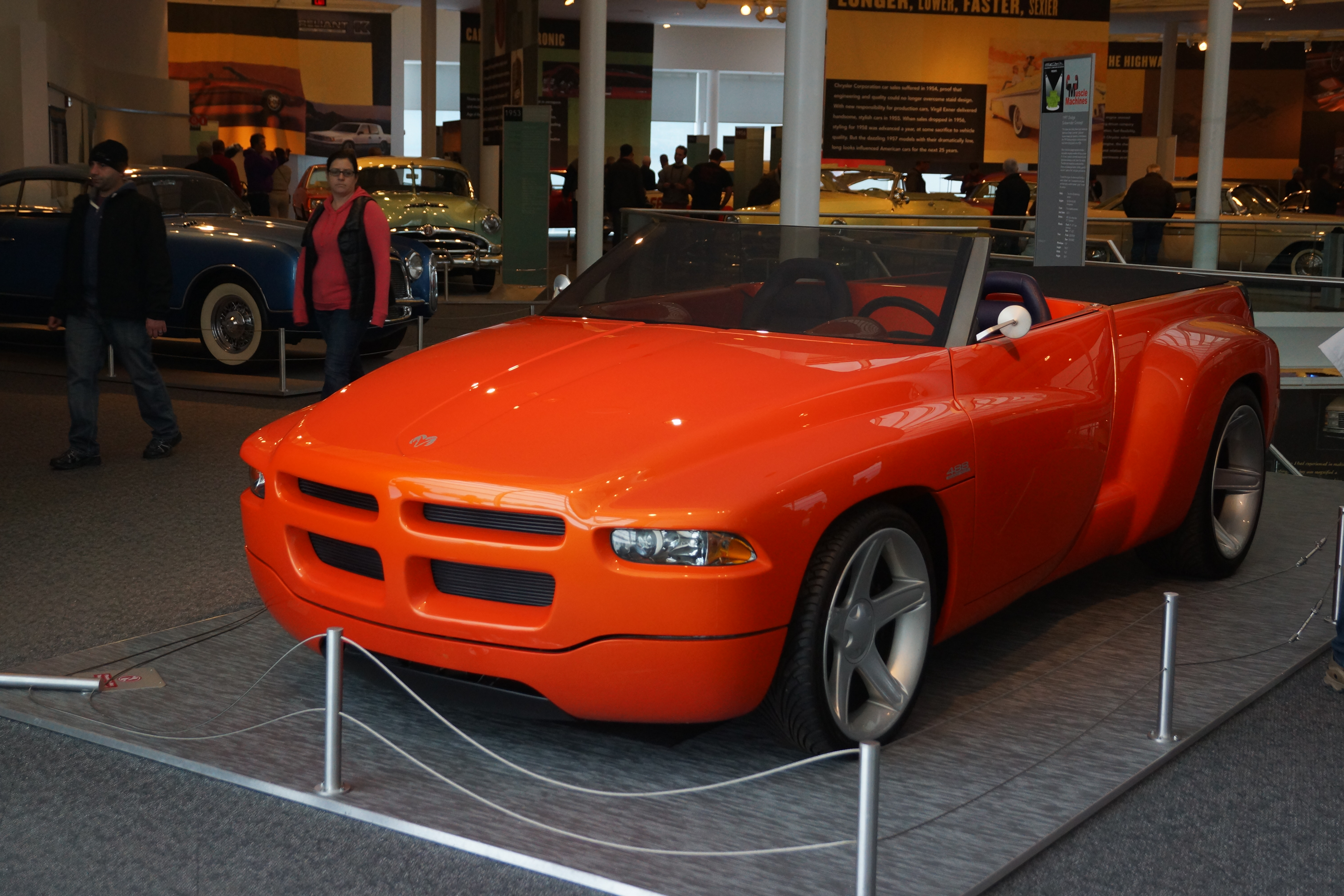

Overview
- Manufacturer: Dodge (Chrysler)
- Also called: Dodge Dakota Sidewinder
- Model years: 1997
- Designer: Mark Allen

Body and chassis
- Class: Pickup truck Concept car
- Body style: 2-door roadster utility

Powertrain
- Engine: 8.0 L Viper V10
- Transmission: 4-speed automatic

Dimensions
- Wheelbase: 112.0 in (2,845 mm)
- Length: 189.0 in (4,801 mm)
- Width: 74.0 in (1,880 mm)
- Height: 56.0 in (1,422 mm)
- Curb weight: 2,700 lb (1,225 kg)

The Dodge Sidewinder was a concept car shown by Dodge in 1997 at the SEMA convention in Las Vegas, Nevada. It was based on a design by Chrysler's Mark Allen, only two years after he graduated from design school. Officially called the Dodge Dakota Sidewinder, it used the front-mounted, Viper GTS-R engine to power the rear wheels, sitting on a chassis built by Riley & Scott. It was envisioned as the futuristic version of a Dodge Dakota convertible.

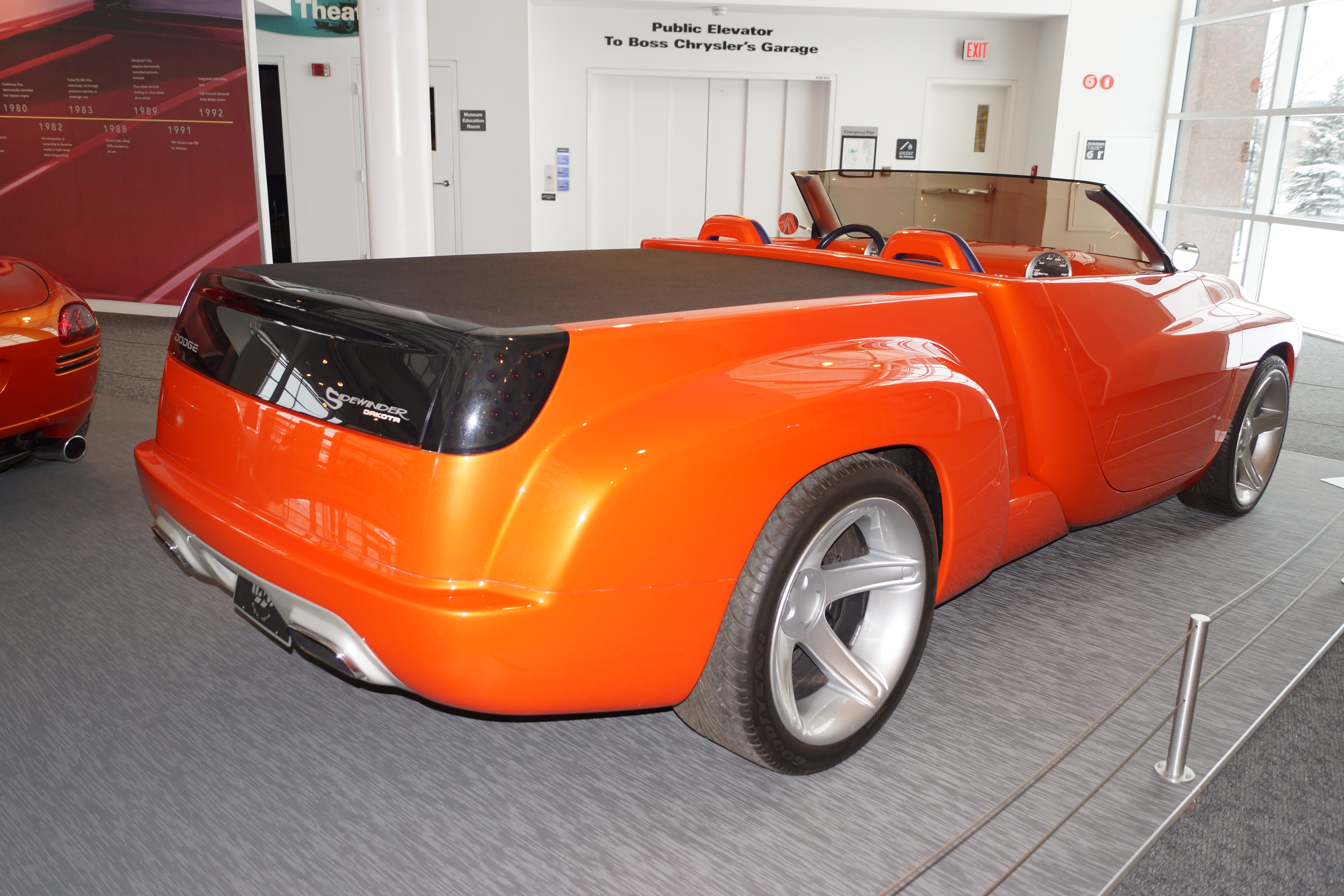
Rear view

The Sidewinder's engine was rated at 640 hp (477 kW) and 530 lb⋅ft (719 N⋅m) of torque, which allowed the car to hit 60 mph (97 km/h) in just under 4 seconds. The top speed of the Sidewinder was 170 mph (274 km/h), and had a 4-speed automatic transmission.
