= Vaydor =

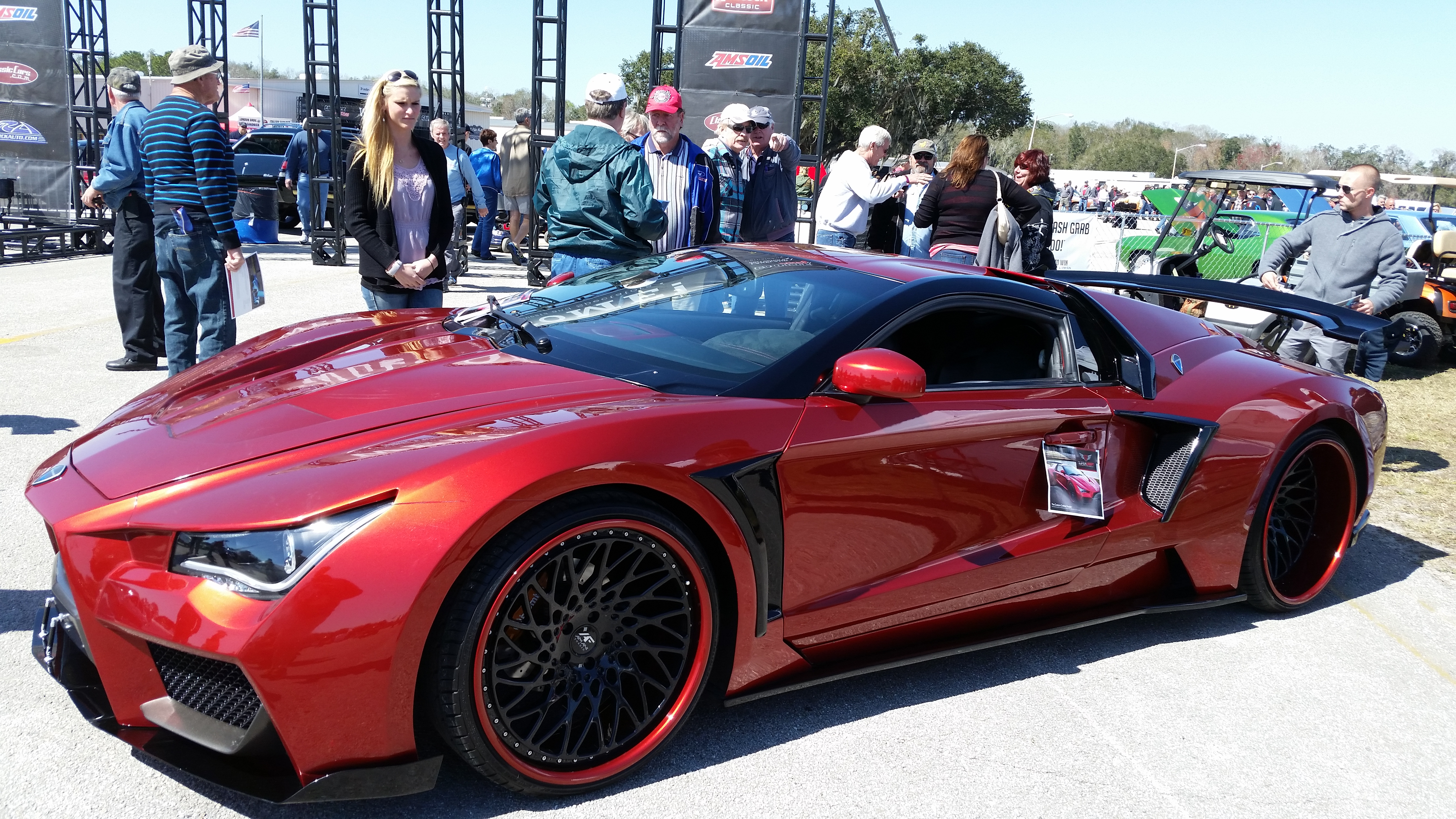

Overview
- Manufacturer: Custom Crafted Cars
- Production: 2013-present
- Assembly: St. Petersburg, Florida
- Designer: Matt McEntegart

Body and chassis
- Class: Body kit
- Body style: Coupe or Roadster
- Layout: Front engine, rear-wheel drive
- Platform: Nissan FM platform
- Doors: 2 Scissor doors
- Related: Infiniti G35/Nissan Skyline v35

Powertrain
- Engine: 3.5L V-6, V-8 LS, 2JZ Engine
- Transmission: 6-speed manual or 5-speed automatic

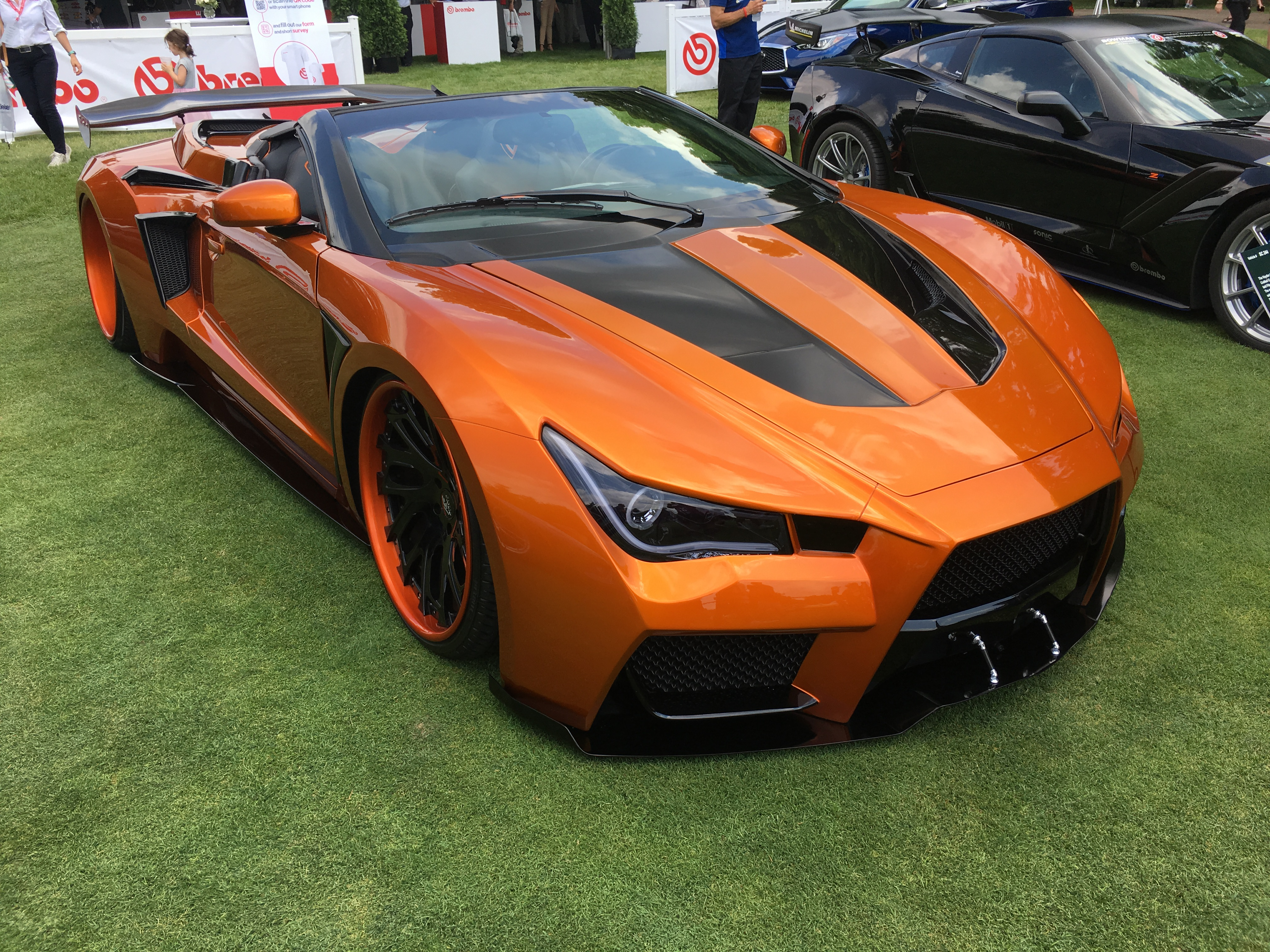
2018 Vaydor Roadster

The Vaydor is an American roadster car manufactured by Custom Crafted Cars in Saint Petersburg, Florida. It is constructed with a body kit that is designed to be built onto a 2003-2007 Infiniti G35 coupe donor car. Vaydor Body Kits are currently available for purchase only from Carolina Vaydor. The Vaydor first appeared in public at the 2013 SEMA auto show.

== History ==
Vaydor Bodykits originally designed, built and sold the Vaydor as a body kit. However, in 2018, the Vaydor business and brand was sold to Custom Crafted Cars (dba Supercraft cars), who sold Vaydors as a completed turn-key custom cars until 2020.

On March 4, 2020, Custom Crafted Cars and Carolina Vaydor reached an agreement to re-launch Vaydor kits to the public. While Custom Crafted cars continues to manufacture complete high-performance Vaydor Supercars, Carolina Vaydor is the exclusive world-wide dealer for Vaydor Body Kits that do-it-yourselfers can build themselves.

The Vaydor was featured as the Joker's car in the 2016 film Suicide Squad, and featured on Fox News. The Vaydor was also the main car featured on Car Masters: Rust to Riches season two, episode 5 on Netflix, where the crew from Gotham Garage builds and sells a highly customized Vaydor for a special customer.

=== Future ===
Custom Crafted Cars plans to release an all-new production car in 2020 called the Volant, built onto a custom tube chassis and powered by a Tesla powertrain.

== Design ==
The Vaydor was designed by entrepreneur Matt McEntegart, who had previous experience making custom hot-rod interiors. There are two primary models of Vaydor, the coupe and hard-top roadster convertible. To support the new body, a custom roll cage is provided with the exterior body kit for structural support and safety. The Vaydor has a 52% front 48% rear weight distribution, and weighs an average of 500-700 lbs less than the original donor car, increasing the power to weight ratio by 15-20%.

=== Engine ===
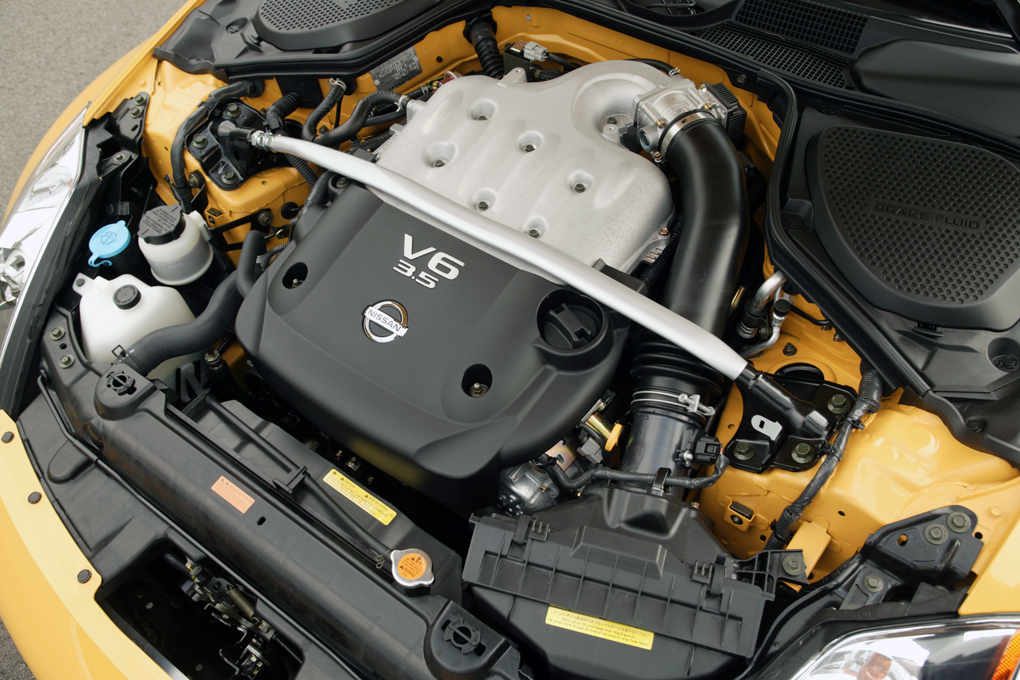
Nissan's VQ35DE engine- the same as the one featured in the Infiniti G35.

The Infiniti G35 coupe comes with the Nissan VQ 3.5L V-6 engine. The engine produces 280 hp (209 kW) and 268 lb⋅ft (363 N⋅m) of torque. Versions of this engine appear in the Infiniti QX60, Mitsubishi Proudia, Renault Laguna, and others. A number of different engines can be installed into the G35 chassis, such as the GM LT4, GM LS3, GM LT1, or Toyota 2JZ.

=== Construction ===
The build process consists of an exterior and interior kit architecture that must be assembled onto an Infiniti G35 coupe donor car. First, the donor Infiniti has to be stripped of its body panels and interior down to the raw chassis. A custom roll cage is provided with the kit that is welded to the donor chassis before the new fiberglass body kit, both exterior and interiors are installed.

=== Slingshot variant ===
In February 2019, Custom Crafted Cars announced a front-end conversion kit for the Polaris Slingshot, which will be produced in collaboration with the company Underground Autostyling.

== Gallery ==
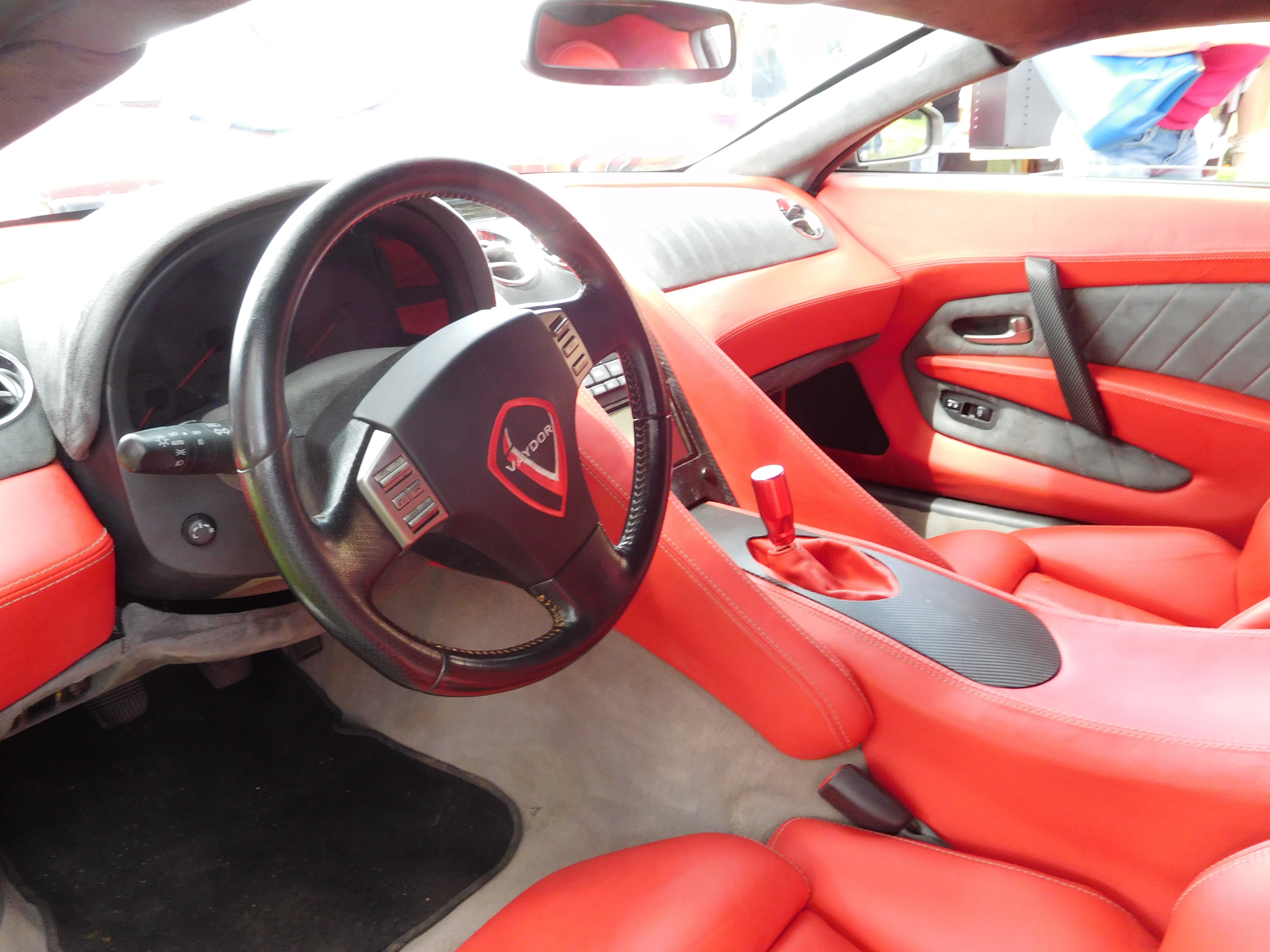
Vaydor Interior example

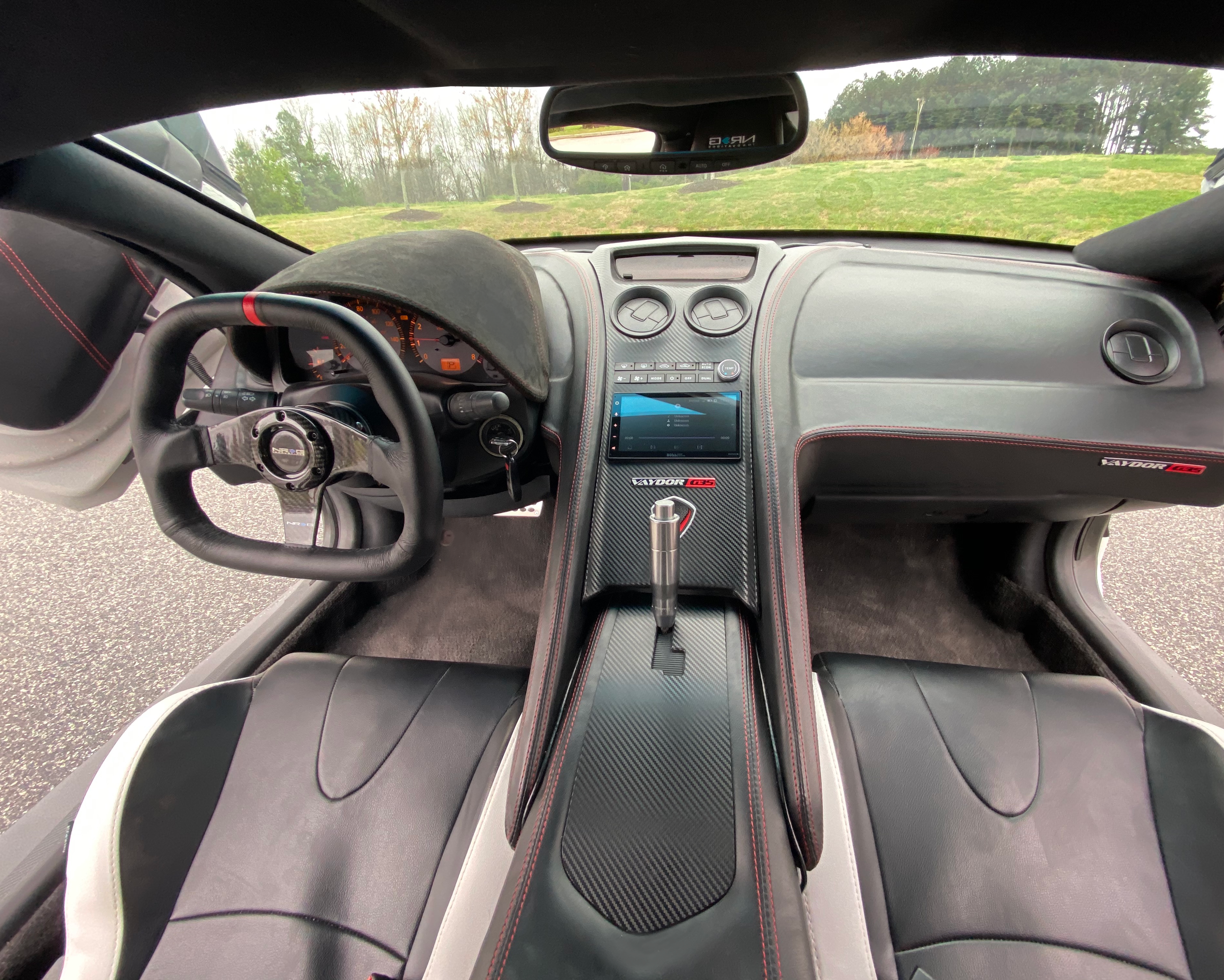
Vaydor Interior example

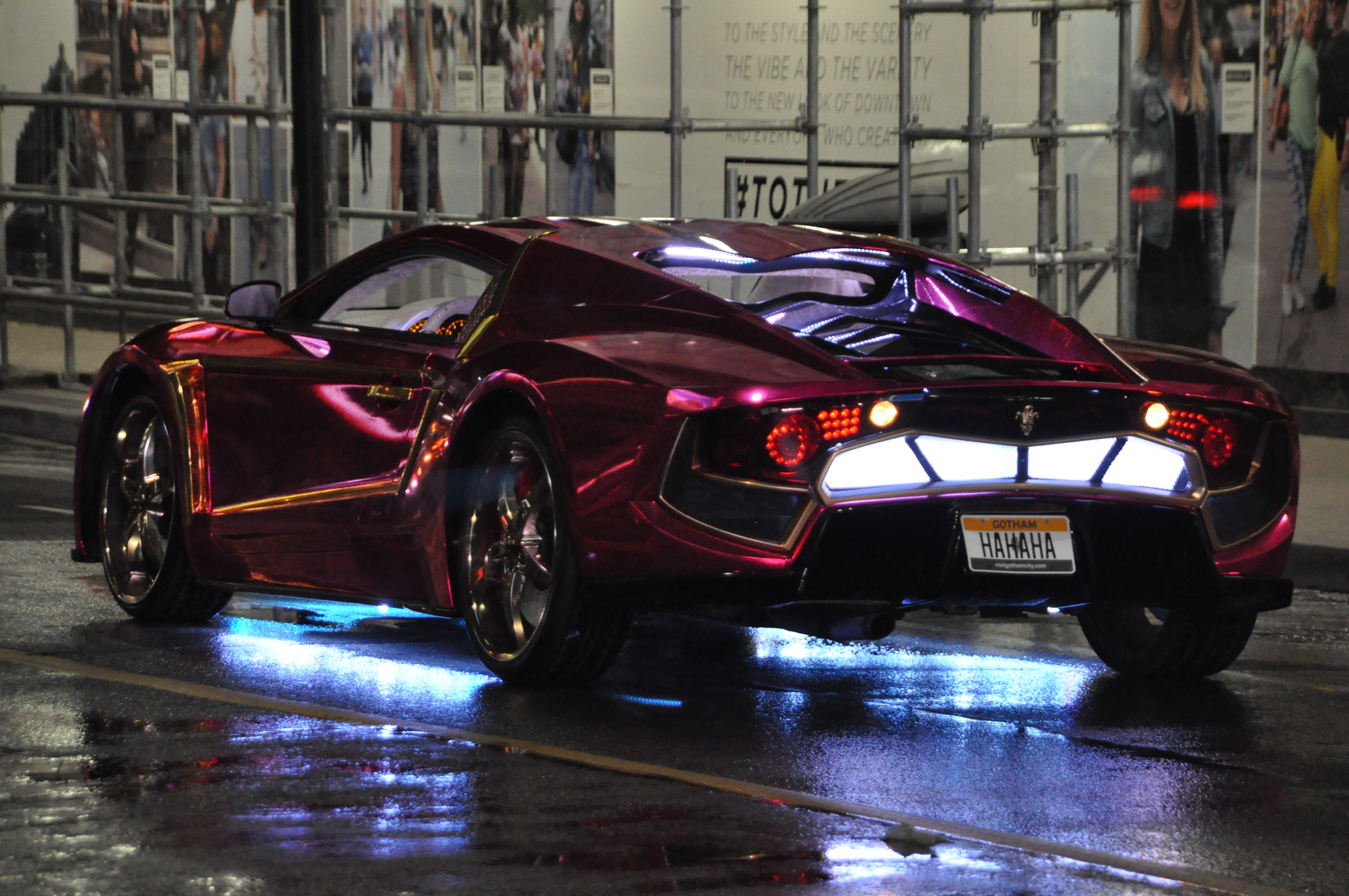
Vaydor from Suicide Squad

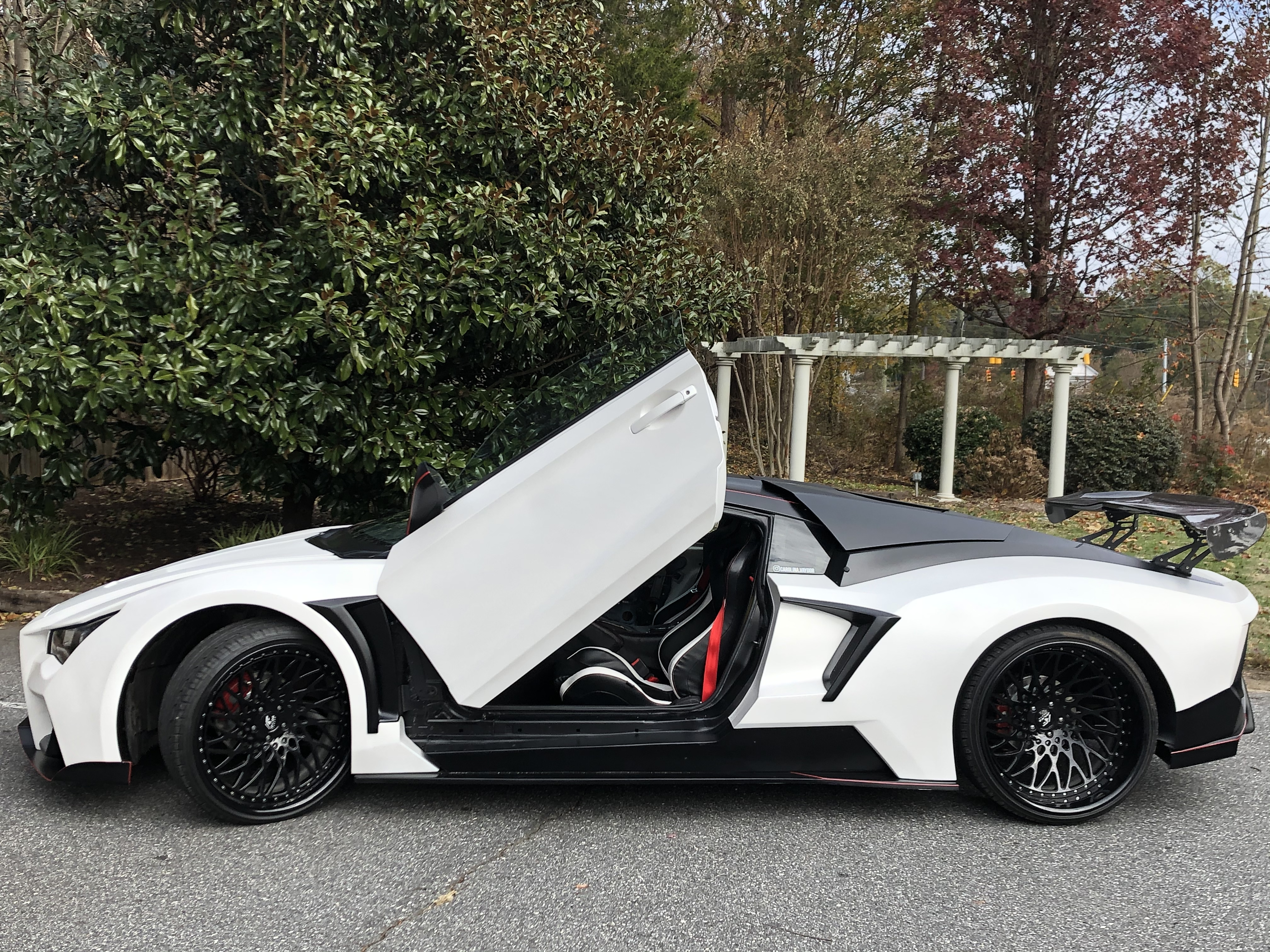
Vaydor coupe with satin pearl paint

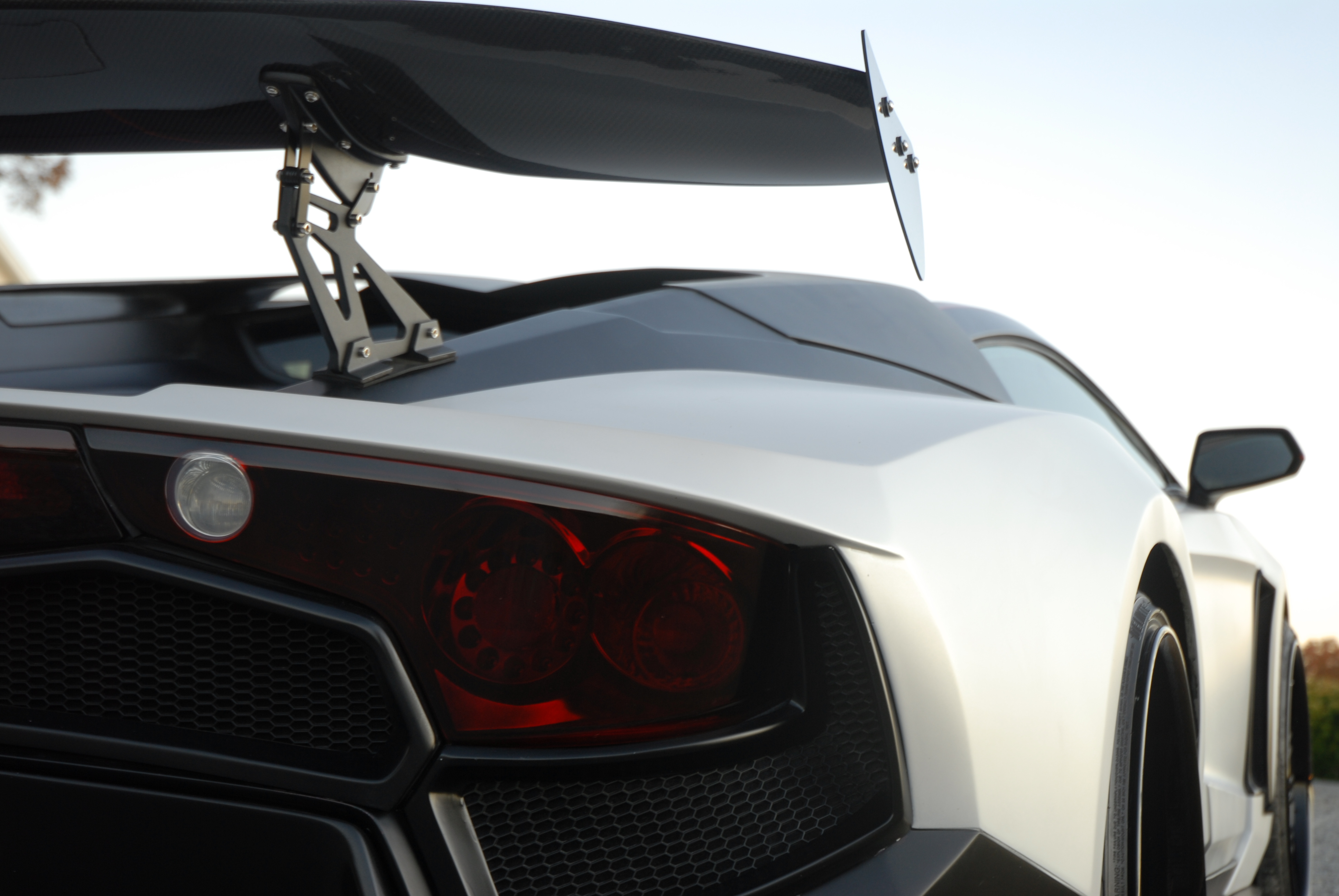
Vaydor satin pearl and black coupe
