= Ed Iskenderian =

American hot rodder and businessman (1921–2026)

- Born: Edward Iskenderian; July 10, 1921; Cutler, California, U.S.
- Died: February 4, 2026 (aged 104); Torrance, California, U.S.
- Occupations: Hot rodder, businessman
- Known for: One of Chevrolet's "Legends of Performance"

Edward "Isky" Iskenderian (July 10, 1921 – February 4, 2026) was an Armenian-American hot rodder and businessman.

== Life and career ==
=== Early life ===
Iskenderian was born on July 10, 1921, in the farming community of Cutler, in the grapevine country of Tulare County, California, to first-generation Armenian immigrants. When frost killed his parents' grape crop, they moved to Los Angeles. He had an early interest in ham radio; soon, he became fascinated with hot rods. He would go racing at Muroc Dry Lake, which was interrupted by the U.S. entry into World War II.

=== Career ===
Iskenderian attended Polytechnic High School in Los Angeles. He built a customized Model T, adapting the overhead camshaft conversion kit produced by the Chevrolet brothers (the "Fronty" kit) and the "multi-flathead" cylinder head developed by George Riley. After suffering a number of failures and experimenting with Fod Model As and Bs, he turned to the crankshaft of the flathead V8, which had larger bearings; it proved stronger. He fitted Maxi F cylinder heads and a custom-built "slingshot" intake manifold provided by Ed Winfield. Iskenderian filled the combustion chambers with cast iron, then rebuilt them under the guidance of Winfield, producing an astounding for the time 13:1 compression ratio.

At the U.S. entry into World War II, Iskenderian enlisted in the United States Army Air Forces, and flew supply missions in the Pacific Theatre with the USAAF Air Transport Command.

After the war, Iskenderian established a business in a small shop space at 5977 Washington Blvd., in Culver City, California; it backed up to Mercury Tool and Die, owned by John Athan, a high school friend., Iskenderian fabricated camshafts and other parts in this shop for fellow hot-rodders. He started with a single cam-grinding machine, which he adapted for the purpose.

When the war ended, Iskenderian, like many other hot-rodders, applied the experience and expertise gained in the Army to car building. Demand for speed parts was high, so when he was forced to wait five months for a new camshaft, he decided instead to grind his own, with a homebuilt grinder adapted from a cylindrical grinder. Iskenderian's new grinds offered markedly better performance than stock ones. To promote his business early on, Iskenderian took a chance on a new publication, buying an advertisement in the second issue of Hot Rod!; it paid off with new business. He was first to promote his business with T-shirts and uniforms. He would move from the Washington Blvd. location before coming back to Culver City, then ultimately moving the company to Gardena in 1966, where it remains.

Iskenderian was also the first to offer a hard-facing on camshafts, and the first to apply computers to cam design. He also offered the first camshafts designed to work with hydraulic lifters.

To serve the burgeoning new supercharged fuel dragsters, he developed better lifters, drop-in self-locking roller lifters, and anti-pump-up hydraulic lifters that were suitable for high-RPM use. The high valve lifts and long durations demanded better valve springs, so Isky produced the Vasco Jet 1000 springs. He worked with Don Garlits, creating the first corporate sponsorship deal in drag racing, the Don's Speed Shop/Ed Iskenderian dragster, which turned in a record 8.36 second/180 mph (290 km/h) pass with Garlits at the wheel. In the 1950s, Iskenderian was the first to offer contingency awards to racers.

Not limiting his focus, Iskenderian offered the first complete valvetrain kits, including camshaft and valve gear, for stock racing classes, as well as street cars. He also produced the first roller lifter cams for Chevrolet engines and the first bushings and cam keys to allow cam timing to be adjusted.

Iskenderian collaborated with Vic Edelbrock Jr., Roy Richter, Bob Hedman, Robert E. Wyman, John Bartlett, Phil Weiand Jr, Dean Moon, Al Segal, and Willie Garner in 1963 to form the Speed Equipment Manufacturers Association, now known as SEMA, serving as its first president during 1963–1964.

=== Later life and death ===
Iskenderian turned 100 in July 2021, and died in Torrance, California, on February 4, 2026, at the age of 104.

== Honors ==
In 1985, Iskenderian was named one of Chevrolet's "Legends of Performance".

The company he founded is now located in Gardena, California.

Iskenderian was inducted into the Motorsports Hall of Fame of America in 2025.
