= American Racing Equipment =

American Racing Equipment Inc. is a manufacturer of wheels sold via the aftermarket retail sector. Production started during the muscle car era in the United States. Platinum Equity investment group acquired American Racing Equipment Inc. in June 2005.

== History ==
Romeo Palamides, an early drag racing innovator and enthusiast of jet car racing, designed high strength-to-weight magnesium drag racing wheels for a competition dragster constructed in the early 1970 Dodge Challenger at the muscle car . The vehicle debuted on the cover of the November 1970 issue of Hot Rod Magazine. In the early years of hot rodding, the car gained attention and generated interest in more efficient wheels designed for the car. Palamides's work with engineer Tom Griffith, operating from Jim Ellison's small machine shop in San Francisco, evolved into the aftermarket wheel company. In 1970, they formed American Racing Equipment.

American Racing Equipment was the first in the industry to introduce a line of wheels with a Teflon coating. Through comprehensive testing, the company has demonstrated that Teflon finish considerably enhances the wheels' resistance to common contaminants such as brake dust, dirt, road film, and ultraviolet degradation. This added resistance allows for more frequent use under harsh conditions with less need for cleaning. The ATX-Series, consisting of the Mojave, Diamond Lock II, and Victor models, embodies this new technology.

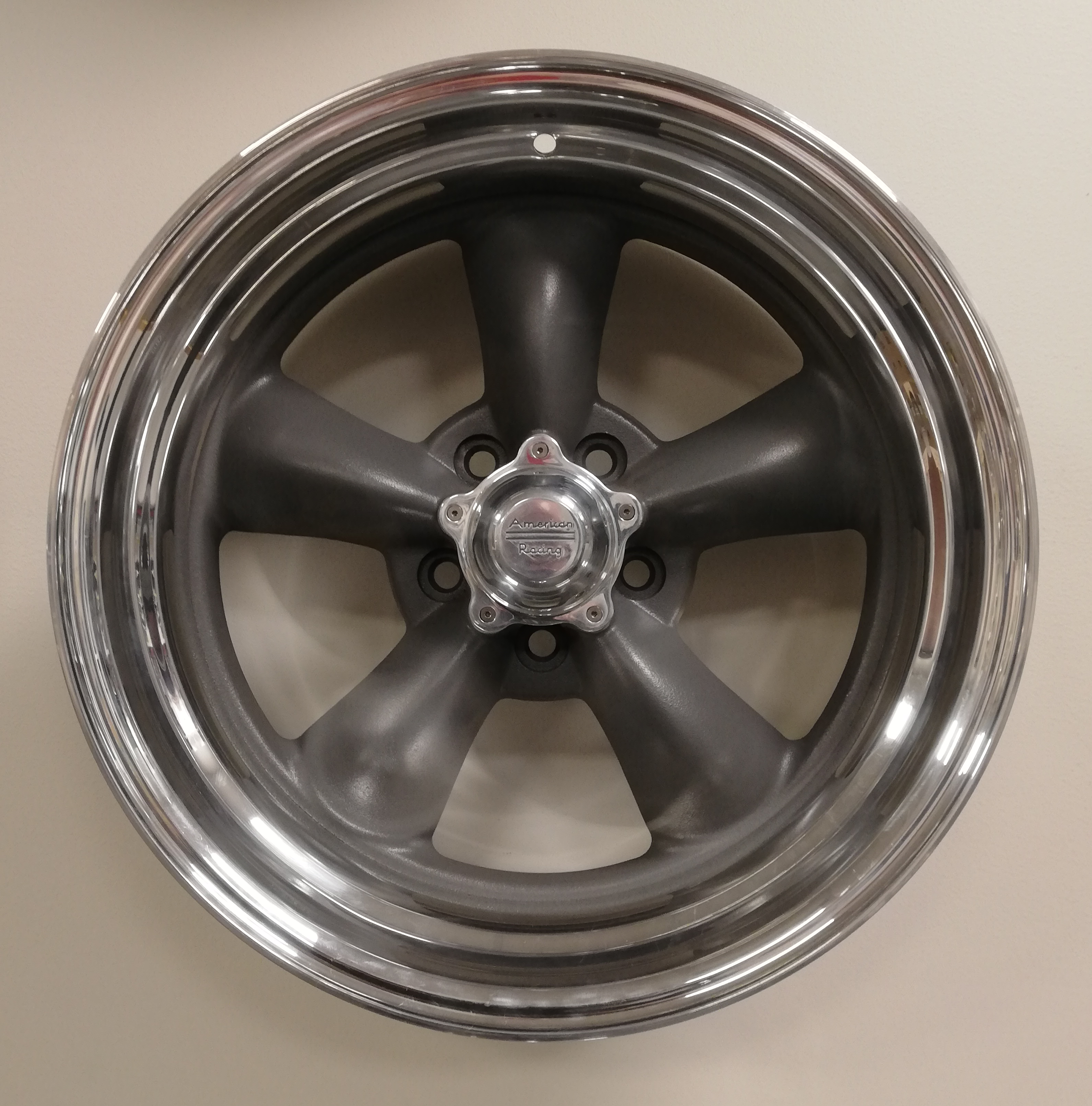
American Racing Torq Thrust Wheel

== Products ==
=== Torq Thrust ===
American Racing produced the Torq Thrust wheel that was first applied on the dragstrip and became a popular street racing wheel. It was specifically designed with a "tapered parabolic contour" spoke, as opposed to a semi-solid modular design, to increase brake cooling and simultaneously decrease wheel mass.

=== Baja ===
The Baja was one of American Racing's first aluminum truck wheels. It is a one-piece, 8-hole design with a polished finish. This wheel is still used with trucks, Jeeps, and other off-road-type vehicles, as well as hot rods and muscle cars. It is available in various sizes, offsets, and lug patterns.

=== Libre ===
The Libre, sometimes known as the "daisy" wheel, was a 4-lug, 4-spoke wheel popular with sports car racers, often seen on MGBs and Datsun 510s. Each spoke appeared to bulge slightly in the middle, giving the wheel a robust appearance. These were cast in magnesium for racing and in aluminum alloy for street use. Eventually, the Libre molds were sold to Shelby American, who marketed the Libre under their name. Some 13" Libres have raised lettering on one spoke reading "SCCA", indicating wheels that were specially made for SCCA's Spec Racer program.

=== 200 S ===
The 200 S used the "daisy" spoke of the Libre in a 5-lug, 5-spoke design. The 200 S was popular with Corvette owners and street rod builders. It was one of the first wheels to go over 200 mph safely, hence the name 200 S.

=== LeMans ===
The LeMans was another 4-spoke, 4-lug design, cast in sizes and fitments for sports cars such as Alfa Romeo, MGB and Datsun 240Z. Each tapered spoke was wider at the hub than at the rim, giving a lightweight appearance similar to Ferrari wheels of the period. BRE 240Zs used these wheels in the SCCA competition, and street-driven 240Zs followed suit.

=== Silverstone ===
This was AR's take on the 4-lug, 8-spoke British Minilite wheel for sports cars, with one side of each spoke relieved near the hub for lug nut clearance, and the other side of each spoke continuing to the hub circle. These were cast in magnesium for racing and aluminum alloy for street use.

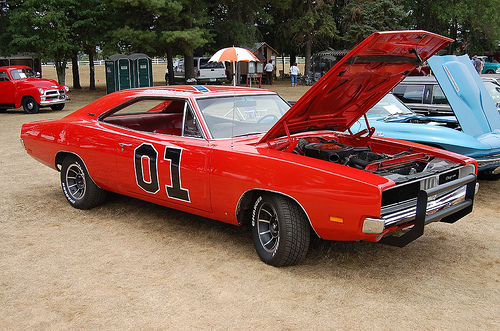
General Lee

=== Vector ===
The Vector is a 5-lug, 10-spoke, one-piece aluminum wheel used on the '69 Dodge Charger called the General Lee, from the television show The Dukes of Hazzard.
