= List of Juniata College people =

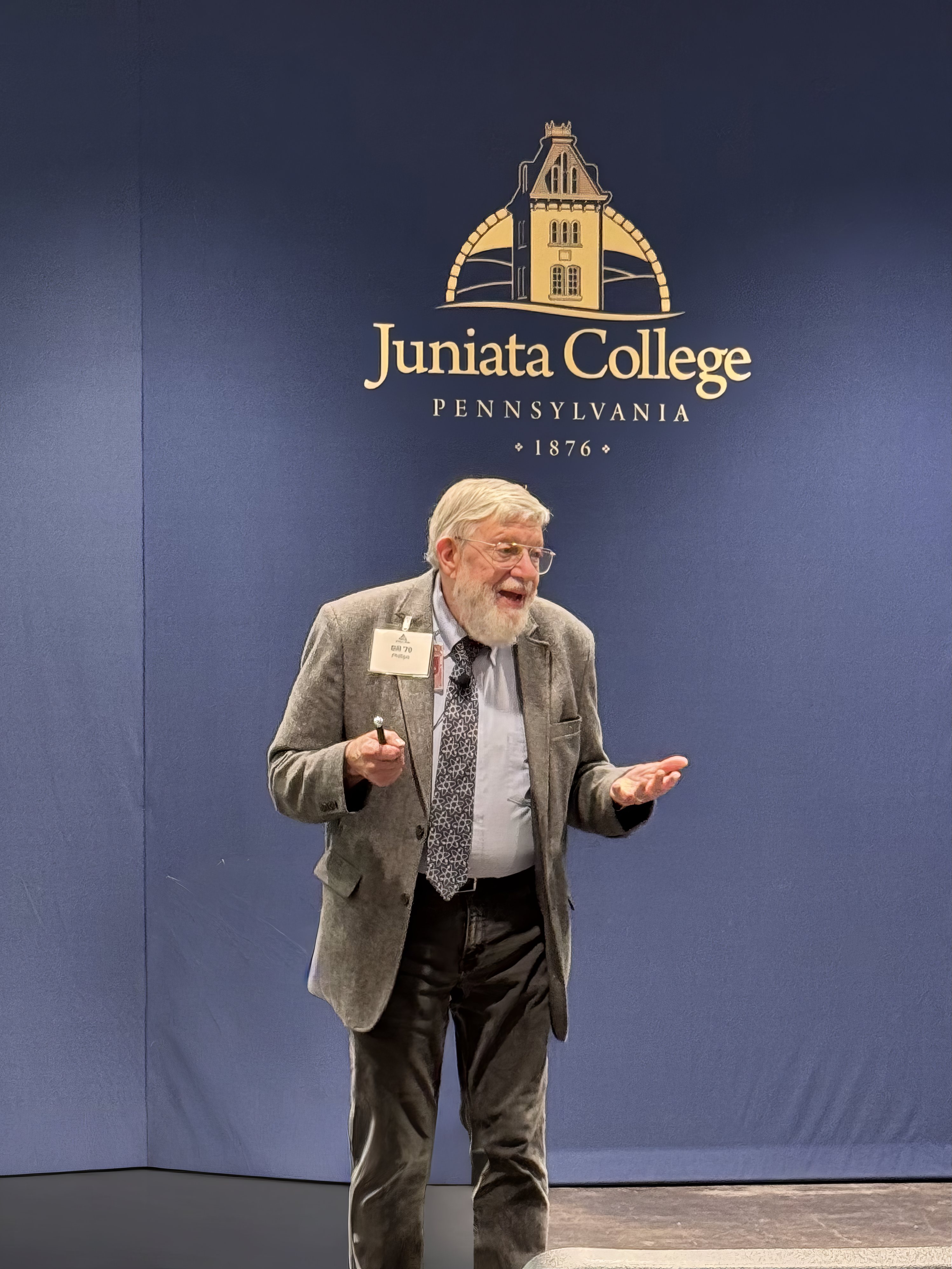
Physicist and Nobel Prize laureate William Daniel Phillips speaking at Juniata College

This is a list of notable Juniata College alumni, in order of graduation year.

- Carl Henry Hoffman, 1922, Republican congressman from Pennsylvania
- Quinn McNemar, 1925, psychologist and statistician
- Francis Harvey Green, 1931, chair of English at West Chester University, Headmaster of Pennington School
- Jack E. Myers, Ph.D., 1934, professor emeritus, University of Texas; one of six Juniata alumni members of the National Academy of Sciences; 1998 recipient of the Society's highest honor, the Founders Award
- Gene E. Sease, Ph.D., 1952, chairman, Sease Gerig & Associates, Indianapolis, Indiana; president emeritus, University of Indianapolis
- Chuck Knox, 1954, former National Football League head coach, Los Angeles Rams, Buffalo Bills and Seattle Seahawks, the NFL's fifth winningest coach
- Harriet Smith Windsor, 1962, secretary of state for the State of Delaware 2001–2009
- Peter Marzio, 1965, former director of Museum of Fine Arts, Houston
- William Phillips, 1970, atomic physicist, National Institute of Standards and Technology, jointly awarded Nobel Prize in 1997 for advancing basic knowledge and new techniques to chill atoms to extremely low temperatures
- Renee D. Diehl, 1976, professor of Physics, Penn State University; Fulbright Fellowship, 2007; Outstanding Service Award from the Women in the Sciences and Engineering (WISE) Institute at Penn State, 2006
- John Kuriyan, 1980, 2005 winner of the Lounsbery Award for extraordinary scientific achievement, Howard Hughes Investigator and Chancellor's Professor of Biochemistry & Molecular Biology at the University of California Berkeley
- Stephanie L. Haines, 1992, judge of the United States District Court for the Western District of Pennsylvania
- Carrie Schofield-Broadbent, 1997, Episcopal bishop of the Diocese of Maryland
- Amanda Matta, 2017, television and social media commentator on the British royal family
