= University Heights, Indianapolis =

Neighborhood in Indianapolis, Indiana, US

University Heights
- Neighborhood Area of Indianapolis
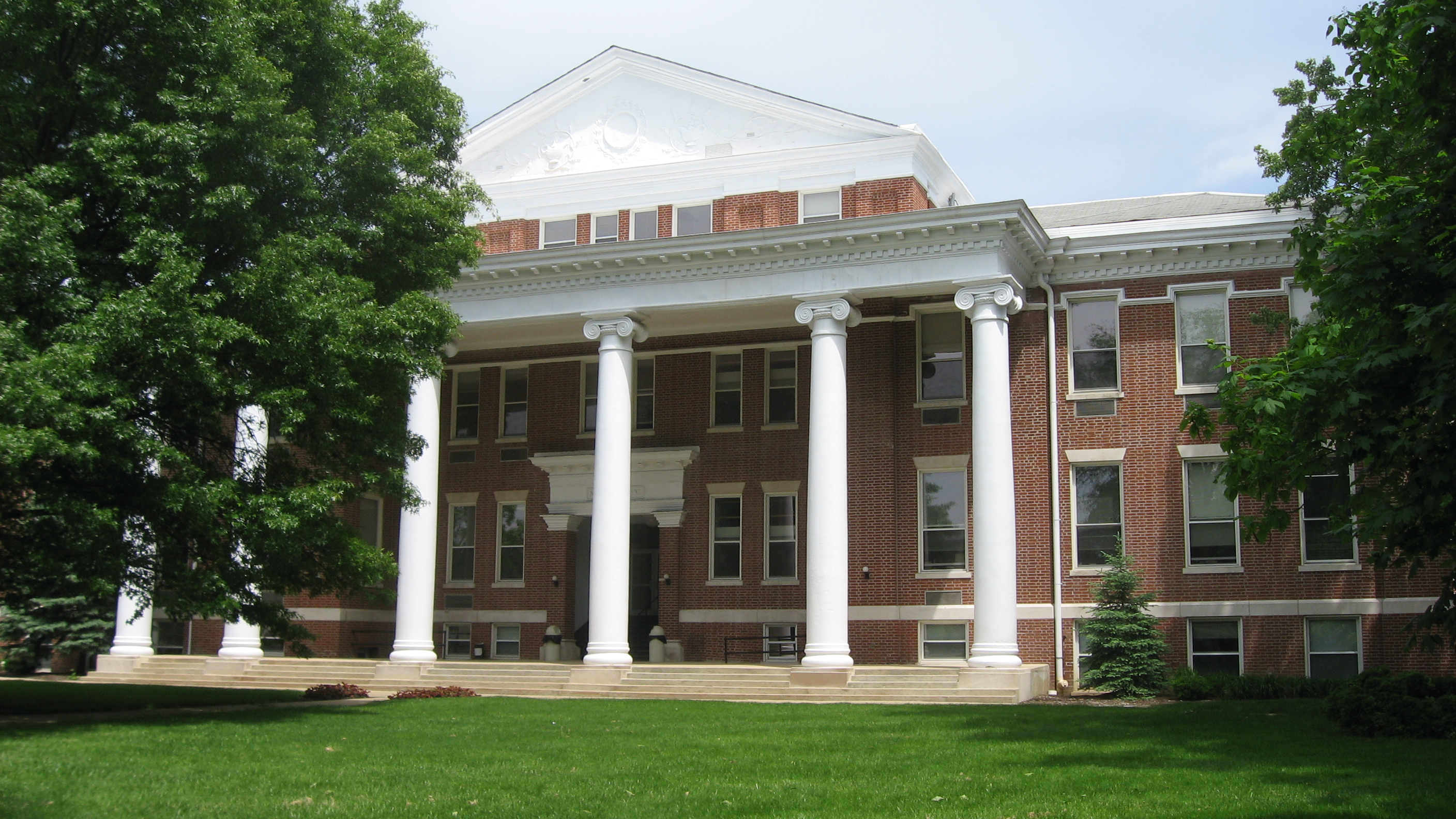
- Good Hall in University Heights

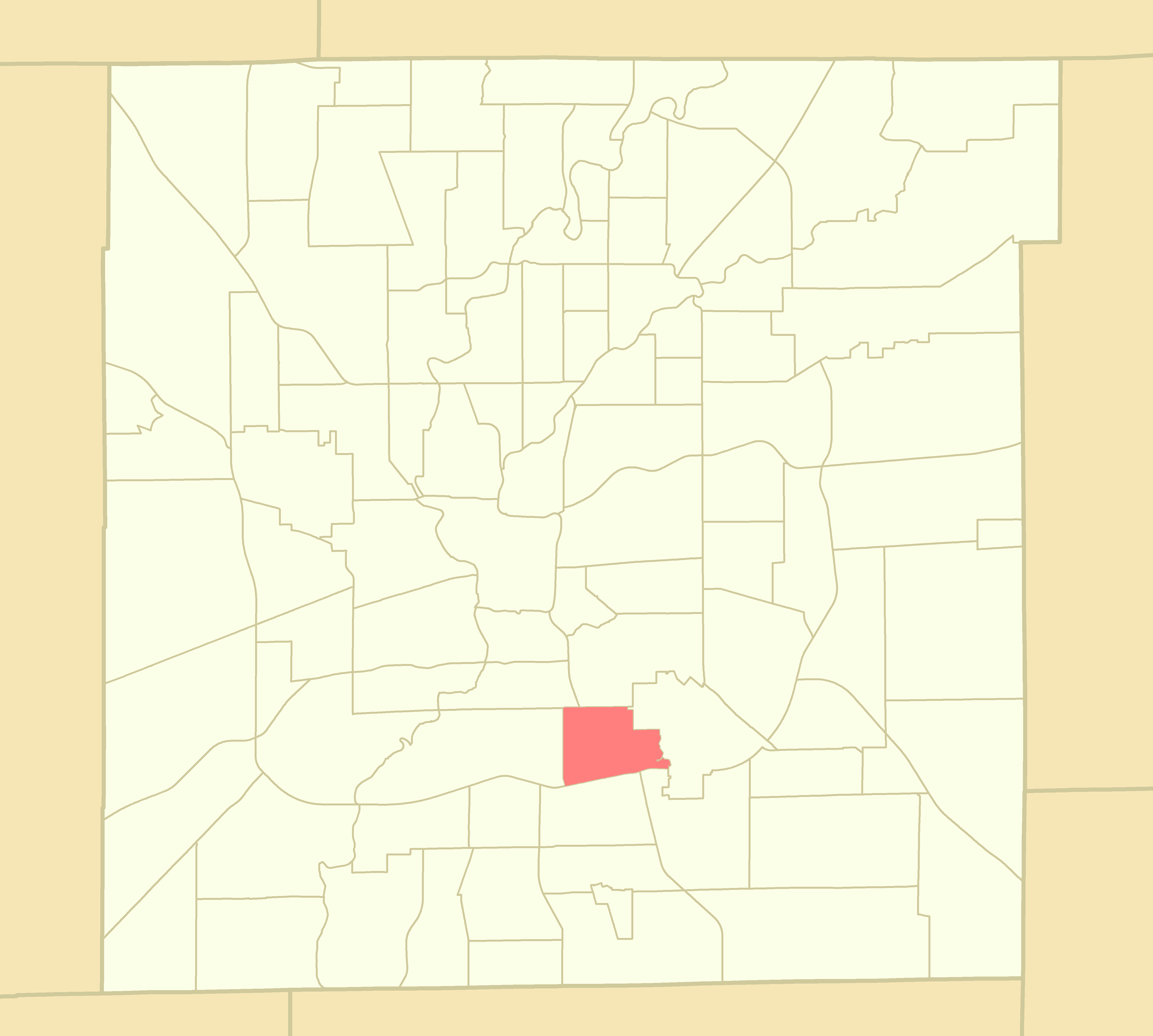
- Location of University Heights within Indianapolis–Marion County, Indiana
- Coordinates: 39°42′20″N 86°08′6.5″W
- Country: United States
- State: Indiana
- County: Marion
- Township: Perry
- City: Indianapolis
- Elevation: 745 ft (227 m)

Population (2020)
  - Total: 12,452
- Time zone: UTC−5 (EST)
  - Summer (DST): UTC−4 (EDT)
- ZIP code: 46227
- Area code: 317 / 463
- Website: www.uheights.us

University Heights is a neighborhood located on the south side of Indianapolis, Indiana, United States. It is adjacent to the University of Indianapolis and contains the southern portion of the campus.

== Location and boundaries ==
Historically, the original neighborhood is roughly bounded by Hanna Avenue (north), Madison Avenue (west), State Avenue (east), and Lawrence Avenue (south) and located about 4 miles (6.4 km) south of downtown Indianapolis. The "neighborhood area" encompasses a larger geography than the historic neighborhood, which is the basis for sociodemographic data collection. (Note: Population figures for individual neighborhood areas can be accessed in two ways via IndyVitals.org: first, by hovering over the interactive map and selecting the neighborhood area, or by selecting the neighborhood area from the dropdown menu on the left side of the webpage.)

== History ==
In the early 20th century, William L. Elder, an Indianapolis real estate developer, offered the Church of the United Brethren in Christ 8 acres (32,000 m^{2}) of land southeast of downtown Indianapolis to establish a college in exchange for help selling 446 building parcels in a subdivision platted as Marion Heights. Indiana Central University (now the University of Indianapolis) was chartered in 1902, but instruction did not start until September 26, 1905, when the first building, Good Hall, was completed.

In 1907, the subdivision was incorporated as University Heights. In 1910, the population was about 100, increasing to nearly 500 by 1920. The City of Indianapolis annexed the town in 1923. According to the Encyclopedia of Indianapolis, homes in the neighborhood were built in a "variety of architectural styles reflecting middle-class tastes from the early 1900s to the 1950s". The neighborhood was largely developed by 1960, with a population of about 1,000.

== Transportation ==
Rapid transit was reintroduced to University Heights with the September 1, 2019, opening of IndyGo's Red Line. The battery electric bus rapid transit route's southern terminus is located at the University of Indianapolis near the intersection of Shelby Street and Hanna Avenue. The route continues south to Greenwood Park Mall as Red Line Local South (Route 902).

Interstate 65 and Interstate 465 are sited adjacent to the northeast and south of the neighborhood.

== See also ==
- List of neighborhoods in Indianapolis
