= 2006 Meijer Indy 300 =

IndyCar race held in Sparta, Kentucky

(United States) 2006 Meijer Indy 300
Race details
Race 12 of 14 in the 2006 IndyCar season
← Previous race	Next race →
- Date: August 13, 2006
- Official name: Meijer Indy 300 Presented by Coca-Cola and Secret
- Location: Kentucky Speedway, Sparta, Kentucky
- Course: Permanent racing facility 1.500 mi / 2.414 km
- Distance: 200 laps 300.000 mi / 482.803 km

Pole position
- Driver: (Brazil) Hélio Castroneves (Marlboro Team Penske)
- Time: 24.4037

Fastest lap
- Driver: (United States) Bryan Herta (Andretti Green Racing)
- Time: 24.3154 (on lap 48 of 200)

Podium
- First: (United States) Sam Hornish Jr. (Marlboro Team Penske)
- Second: (New Zealand) Scott Dixon (Target Chip Ganassi Racing)
- Third: (Brazil) Hélio Castroneves (Marlboro Team Penske)

The 2006 Meijer Indy 300 was an IndyCar Series motor race held on August 13, 2006, in Sparta, Kentucky at Kentucky Speedway. It was the twelfth round of the 2006 IndyCar Series and the seventh running of the event. Sam Hornish Jr., driving for Marlboro Team Penske, won the 200-lap race. Target Chip Ganassi Racing driver Scott Dixon finished second and Hornish Jr.'s teammate Hélio Castroneves finished third.

Castroneves earned the pole position after posting the fastest lap of qualifying. He and Hornish Jr. swapped the lead five times before making their first pit stops on lap 54. After a caution was flown, the Marlboro Team Penske drivers were relegated back in the field as Wheldon and his teammate Scott Dixon took control of the race. Hornish Jr. climbed back up to the lead on lap 96 and held it until Wheldon reclaimed the first position shortly after a lap-135 restart. Wheldon and Hornish Jr. then engaged in a fierce battle for the lead, which ended after Wheldon slipped up in his final pit stop on lap 185. Hornish Jr. passed Dixon on a restart and led the final five laps to earn his eighteenth IndyCar victory and fourth of the season.

As a result of the race, Hornish Jr. retook the first position in the Drivers' Championship, leading second-place driver Castroneves by seven points. Wheldon remained third, ahead of Dixon and Vítor Meira (who finished sixth), with two races left in the season.

== Background ==
The Meijer Indy 300 was the 12th of 14 scheduled open-wheel races for the 2006 IndyCar Series and the seventh edition of the event dating back to 2000. It was held on August 13, 2006, in Sparta, Kentucky, United States, at Kentucky Speedway, a four-turn 1.5 mi (2.4 km) asphalt tri-oval track which features 14-degree banking in the turns and 4-degree banking in the back stretch, and contested over 200 laps and 300 miles (480 km). Heading into the race, Marlboro Team Penske driver Hélio Castroneves led the Drivers' Championship with 376 points, and teammate Sam Hornish Jr. was second with 368. Target Chip Ganassi Racing drivers Dan Wheldon and Scott Dixon were third and fourth with 359 and 345 points, respectively, and Vítor Meira of Panther Racing was fifth with 320. Scott Sharp was the race's defending champion.

Castroneves, who had taken the championship lead with his win in the preceding Firestone Indy 400, expected the race at Kentucky to be "an exciting show for the fans" because of the track's slimness, which allowed for side-by-side racing. Hornish Jr. considered Kentucky to be a difficult track because of its bumpy and slick surface, but looked forward to putting his poor finish at Michigan International Speedway behind him. After several misfortunes befell Wheldon and Dixon in the past two races, both drivers were determined to win races and the championship. Meira believed he could continue the success that Panther Racing had achieved at Kentucky due to his consistency throughout the season.

One team made a driver change for the race. Sarah Fisher, who had not competed in an IndyCar race since the 2004 Indianapolis 500, was chosen to drive the No. 5 car for Dreyer & Reinbold Racing at Kentucky. It was previously rumored that Fisher would drive the car in the Firestone Indy 400, though team co-owner Dennis Reinbold shut them down. Fisher expressed excitement for her return to the IndyCar Series and was grateful for her fans' support. Fisher and Danica Patrick's participation in the race marked the first time since the 2000 Indianapolis 500 in which two female drivers took part in an IndyCar race.

== Practice and qualifying ==
Two practice sessions preceded the race on Sunday, both of which were held on Saturday, lasted for 90 minutes, and divided into two groups of drivers who received equal track time. Weather conditions during the practice sessions were warm and grew hotter as the day went on. Wheldon had the fastest time of the first practice session at 24.3720 seconds, three-hundredths of a second faster than Castroneves in second. Hornish Jr. was third, ahead of Scott Sharp and Meira. Dixon outperformed Wheldon's lap during the second practice session with a time of 24.3536 seconds. He was two-hundredths of a second quicker than Castroneves; Hornish Jr., Wheldon, and Kosuke Matsuura took the remaining top-five positions.

During qualifying, each driver was required to complete two timed laps, and the starting order was determined by the competitor's fastest lap time. Castroneves earned his 16th career and third consecutive pole position with a time of 24.4037 seconds. He was joined on the grid's front row by teammate Hornish Jr., who was 0.0023 seconds slower and had the pole position until Castroneves' lap. Castroneves later said he was happy with the result and aimed to win the race in order to protect his championship lead. Wheldon qualified third, ahead of Kanaan in fourth and Dixon fifth. Dario Franchitti, Matsuura, Ed Carpenter, Meira, and Sharp rounded out the top-ten starting positions, and Patrick, Fisher, Bryan Herta, Buddy Rice, Jeff Simmons, Jeff Bucknum, Tomas Scheckter, Marco Andretti, and Marty Roth completed the starting grid. Scheckter and Carpenter were each limited to one timed lap—Scheckter for swapping engines after the second practice session, and Carpenter for failing pre-qualifying inspection.

=== Qualifying classification ===
Pos	No.	Driver	Team	Time	Speed	Final grid
1	3	(Brazil) Hélio Castroneves	Marlboro Team Penske	24.4037	218.328	1
2	6	(United States) Sam Hornish Jr.	Marlboro Team Penske	24.4060	218.307	2
3	10	(United Kingdom) Dan Wheldon	Target Chip Ganassi Racing	24.5526	217.003	3
4	11	(Brazil) Tony Kanaan	Andretti Green Racing	24.5795	216.766	4
5	9	(New Zealand) Scott Dixon	Target Chip Ganassi Racing	24.5856	216.712	5
6	27	(United Kingdom) Dario Franchitti	Andretti Green Racing	24.5909	216.666	6
7	55	(Japan) Kosuke Matsuura	Super Aguri Fernández Racing	24.6220	216.392	7
8	20	(United States) Ed Carpenter	Vision Racing	24.6223	216.389	8
9	4	(Brazil) Vítor Meira	Panther Racing	24.6459	216.182	9
10	8	(United States) Scott Sharp	Delphi Fernández Racing	24.6793	215.889	10
11	16	(United States) Danica Patrick	Rahal Letterman Racing	24.7289	215.456	11
12	5	(United States) Sarah Fisher	Dreyer & Reinbold Racing	24.7744	215.061	12
13	7	(United States) Bryan Herta	Andretti Green Racing	24.7827	214.989	13
14	15	(United States) Buddy Rice	Rahal Letterman Racing	24.8344	214.541	14
15	17	(United States) Jeff Simmons	Rahal Letterman Racing	24.8364	214.524	15
16	14	(United States) Jeff Bucknum	A. J. Foyt Racing	24.8429	214.468	16
17	2	(South Africa) Tomas Scheckter	Vision Racing	24.8861	214.095	17
18	26	(United States) Marco Andretti	Andretti Green Racing	24.8999	213.977	18
19	25	(Canada) Marty Roth	Roth Racing	24.9716	213.362	19

== Warm-up ==
The drivers took to the track on Sunday morning for a thirty-minute warm-up session under hot weather. Dixon had the fastest time of the session at 24.3062 seconds, besting Hornish Jr., Matsuura, Wheldon, and Castroneves. The session came to a premature end after Meira swerved to the infield grass to avoid Patrick, who turned left into the blend line, but collided into her, spinning out both drivers in turn three. The incident damaged Meira's suspension and Patrick's suspension and radiator; Patrick's engine was also changed at the request of Honda.

== Race ==
Live television coverage of the race began at 3:30 PM EDT (UTC−04:00) in the United States on ABC. Commentary was provided by Marty Reid, Rusty Wallace, and Scott Goodyear. An estimated 35,000 people attended the race. The hot weather conditions that were present on Saturday returned on Sunday, with air temperatures at 86 °F (30 °C) and track temperatures at 120 °F (49 °C). Pro Football Hall of Fame inductee Anthony Muñoz gave the command for drivers to start their engines and three-time Indianapolis 500 winner Johnny Rutherford drove the pace car.

On the first lap, Castroneves maintained his pole position advantage, while Andretti immediately moved into 14th. Hornish Jr. passed Castroneves for the lead five laps later and held it until Castroneves drove alongside him and led the 19th lap. Hornish Jr. passed him back one lap later, briefly concluding their battle; Wheldon attempted to overtake Castroneves for second on the outside line, but failed. Elsewhere, Andretti had moved into the tenth position. On the 31st lap, Hornish Jr. struggled to maneuver around Roth, allowing Castroneves and Wheldon to pass him for the first and second positions. Twenty-four laps later, Carpenter made a pit stop from fifth place, thus kicking off the first-round of green-flag pit stops. As Castroneves and Hornish Jr. completed their pit stops, giving the lead to Wheldon, the first caution flag of the race was issued on lap 56 after Carpenter spun out while exiting pit road. All the leaders made pit stops under the caution.

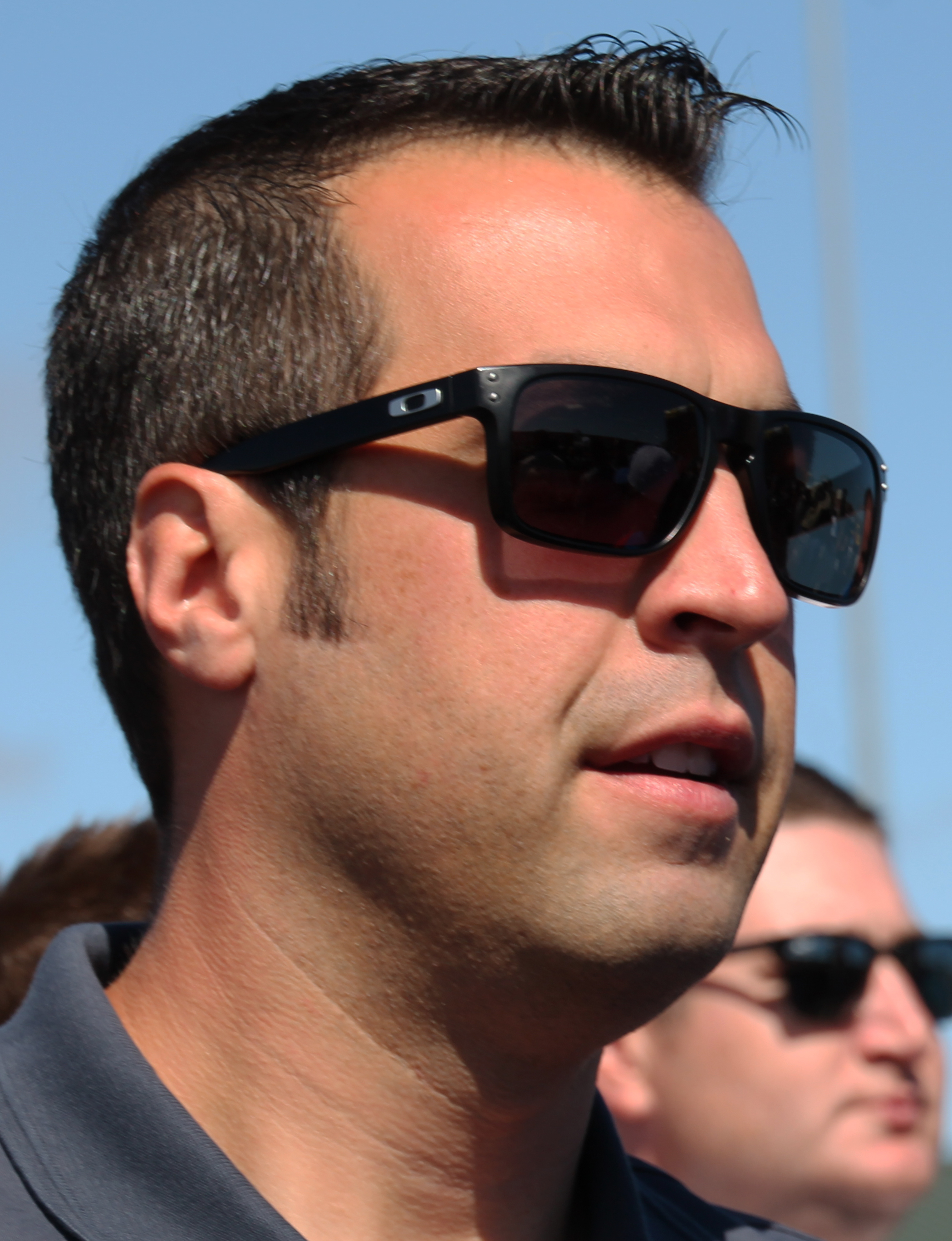
Sam Hornish Jr. (pictured in 2015) won the race after passing Scott Dixon with five laps remaining.

Wheldon reclaimed the lead after Dixon made his stop and led the field back up to speed on the lap-65 restart, while Castroneves was relegated to ninth and Hornish Jr. to tenth. Wheldon held a measly 0.1-second lead over Dixon by lap 75. Five laps later, Dixon drove to the inside line and took the lead from Wheldon. On lap 89, debris was spotted in the fourth turn, prompting the second caution. The leaders made pit stops during the caution period, with Meira taking the lead from Dixon on the 92nd lap by virtue of a quicker pit stop. Meira led at the restart on lap 96, followed by Kanaan and Hornish Jr., the latter of whom quickly overtook Meira for the first position that same lap. The third caution was flown twenty-three laps later when Matsuura spun up the track and slammed into the third-turn SAFER barrier. Most of the leaders made pit stops for tires and fuel; additionally, Patrick's team replaced her headrest padding. The caution period was lengthened to repair the SAFER barrier.

Herta chose not to make a pit stop and led at the restart on lap 135, followed by Hornish Jr. and Kanaan. Wheldon, who was fifth on the restart, took the lead from Herta four laps later and engaged in a side-by-side battle with Herta and Hornish Jr. until lap 144. While Herta pitted on lap 160, Hornish Jr. remained in hot pursuit of leader Wheldon and edged past him to lead the 171st and 178th laps. The second round of green-flag pit stops commenced on lap 183. Wheldon and Hornish Jr. entered pit road two laps later, handing the lead to Dixon. Wheldon had accidentally overshot the entry to his pit stall, forcing him to spend several additional seconds in pit road as his crew pushed his car into place. On lap 188, Andretti - the momentary race leader - slid into the grass as he entered pit road; while he kept his car under control, debris had built up within his tires and he made another pit stop, eventually placing him three laps down.

Shortly after Dixon reclaimed the lead, Sharp spun in the second turn, bringing out the fourth (and final) caution on lap 192. None of the leaders made pit stops and Dixon led on the lap-195 restart, ahead of Hornish Jr. and Castroneves. Hornish Jr. drove up to Dixon's right side and passed him for the lead in the fourth turn on lap 196. He maintained the lead for the final four laps to earn his 18th career IndyCar win and fourth of the season. Dixon finished second, 0.5866 seconds behind Hornish Jr., while Castroneves was third, Wheldon fourth, and Kanaan fifth. Meira, Scheckter, Patrick, Franchitti, and Herta rounded out the top-ten in the finishing order; Carpenter, Fisher, Bucknum, and Simmons occupied the next positions, a lap behind the leader. Rice and Sharp finished two laps down. Andretti, three laps down, and Roth, four laps down, were the last of the classified finishers. Due to Matsuura's crash, he was the only retiree of the race.

=== Post-race ===
Hornish Jr. drove into victory lane to celebrate his second win at Kentucky, which earned him $115,800. After the race, a delighted Hornish Jr. was grateful for his team's quick pit stops, saying: "The car was great. The team gave me awesome pit stops today. We were just trying to bide our time, make it to the end of the race to give ourselves that opportunity to win. This makes up a little bit for Michigan. We're real, real happy." Dixon was somewhat pleased with finishing second: "Not too bad a day. The car seemed really strong early on, so we just sat back and saved fuel. It was pretty good at the end, but the other cars seemed to get stronger, or at least they came on at the end." However, he was frustrated with the way Hornish Jr. and Castroneves raced him on the final restart: "We struggled on the restart. Sam (Hornish Jr.) cut me right off and cost me a big gap, and then Hélio (Castroneves) was on top of me." Castroneves felt he had the fastest car of the race, but was nonetheless content with finishing in third.

Fourth-place finisher Wheldon took accountability for the lengthy pit stop that ultimately cost him the win, admitting he had nearly driven into Hornish Jr.'s pit stall, and opined that his car was the fastest of the field. He had earned three bonus points for leading 66 laps, more than any other competitor. Andretti Green Racing teammates Kanaan and Franchitti both acknowledged that their performance was not on par with the other drivers; Franchitti stated: "We're all working very hard but we deserve better at this point." Herta conversely thought that his performance in the race was "a step in the right direction." After the race, Dreyer & Reinbold Racing co-owners Reinbold and Robbie Buhl were satisfied with Fisher's race and confirmed that she would return to drive their No. 5 car at Chicagoland Speedway. The final result meant that Hornish Jr. took back the lead in the Drivers' Championship, having earned 418 points, while teammate Castroneves fell to second with 411 points. Wheldon maintained third place with 394 points, nine more than Dixon in fourth. Meira, with 348 points, remained fifth. Hornish Jr., Castroneves, Wheldon, Dixon, Meira, and Kanaan (who was sixth in the championship) were the only drivers who had a mathematical chance to win the championship with two races remaining in the season.

=== Race classification ===
Pos	No.	Driver	Team	Laps	Time/Retired	Grid	Pts.
1	6	(United States) Sam Hornish Jr.	Marlboro Team Penske	200	01:44:03.4120	2	50
2	9	(New Zealand) Scott Dixon	Target Chip Ganassi Racing	200	+0.5866	5	40
3	3	(Brazil) Hélio Castroneves	Marlboro Team Penske	200	+0.6511	1	35
4	10	(United Kingdom) Dan Wheldon	Target Chip Ganassi Racing	200	+1.8913	3	35^{1}
5	11	(Brazil) Tony Kanaan	Andretti Green Racing	200	+2.3049	4	30
6	4	(Brazil) Vítor Meira	Panther Racing	200	+2.5191	9	28
7	2	(South Africa) Tomas Scheckter	Vision Racing	200	+2.8124	17	26
8	16	(United States) Danica Patrick	Rahal Letterman Racing	200	+3.2408	11	24
9	27	(United Kingdom) Dario Franchitti	Andretti Green Racing	200	+4.7070	6	22
10	7	(United States) Bryan Herta	Andretti Green Racing	200	+4.7966	13	20
11	20	(United States) Ed Carpenter	Vision Racing	199	+1 lap	8	19
12	5	(United States) Sarah Fisher	Dreyer & Reinbold Racing	199	+1 lap	12	18
13	14	(United States) Jeff Bucknum	A. J. Foyt Racing	199	+1 lap	16	17
14	17	(United States) Jeff Simmons	Rahal Letterman Racing	199	+1 lap	15	16
15	15	(United States) Buddy Rice	Rahal Letterman Racing	198	+2 laps	14	15
16	8	(United States) Scott Sharp	Delphi Fernández Racing	198	+2 laps	10	14
17	26	(United States) Marco Andretti	Andretti Green Racing	197	+3 laps	18	13
18	25	(Canada) Marty Roth	Roth Racing	196	+4 laps	19	12
19	55	(Japan) Kosuke Matsuura	Super Aguri Fernández Racing	118	Accident	7	12

Notes

- ^1— Includes three bonus points for leading the most laps.

== Championship standings after the race ==
Drivers' Championship standings
	Pos.	Driver	Points
1	1	(United States) Sam Hornish Jr.	418
1	2	(Brazil) Hélio Castroneves	411 (–7)
Unchanged	3	(United Kingdom) Dan Wheldon	394 (–24)
Unchanged	4	(New Zealand) Scott Dixon	385 (–33)
Unchanged	5	(Brazil) Vítor Meira	348 (–70)
Sources:

- Note: Only the top five positions are included.

Previous race: 2006 Firestone Indy 400	IndyCar Series; 2006 season	Next race: 2006 Indy Grand Prix of Sonoma
Previous race: 2005 AMBER Alert Portal Indy 300	Kentucky Indy 300	Next race: 2007 Meijer Indy 300
