= Tanuj =

Tanuj is an Indian masculine given name. Notable people with the name include:

- Tanuj Virwani (born 1986), Indian actor and model
- Tanuj Chopra, American filmmaker

== See also ==
- Tanuja (name)
