= Administration Building, Indiana Central University =

- U.S. National Register of Historic Places
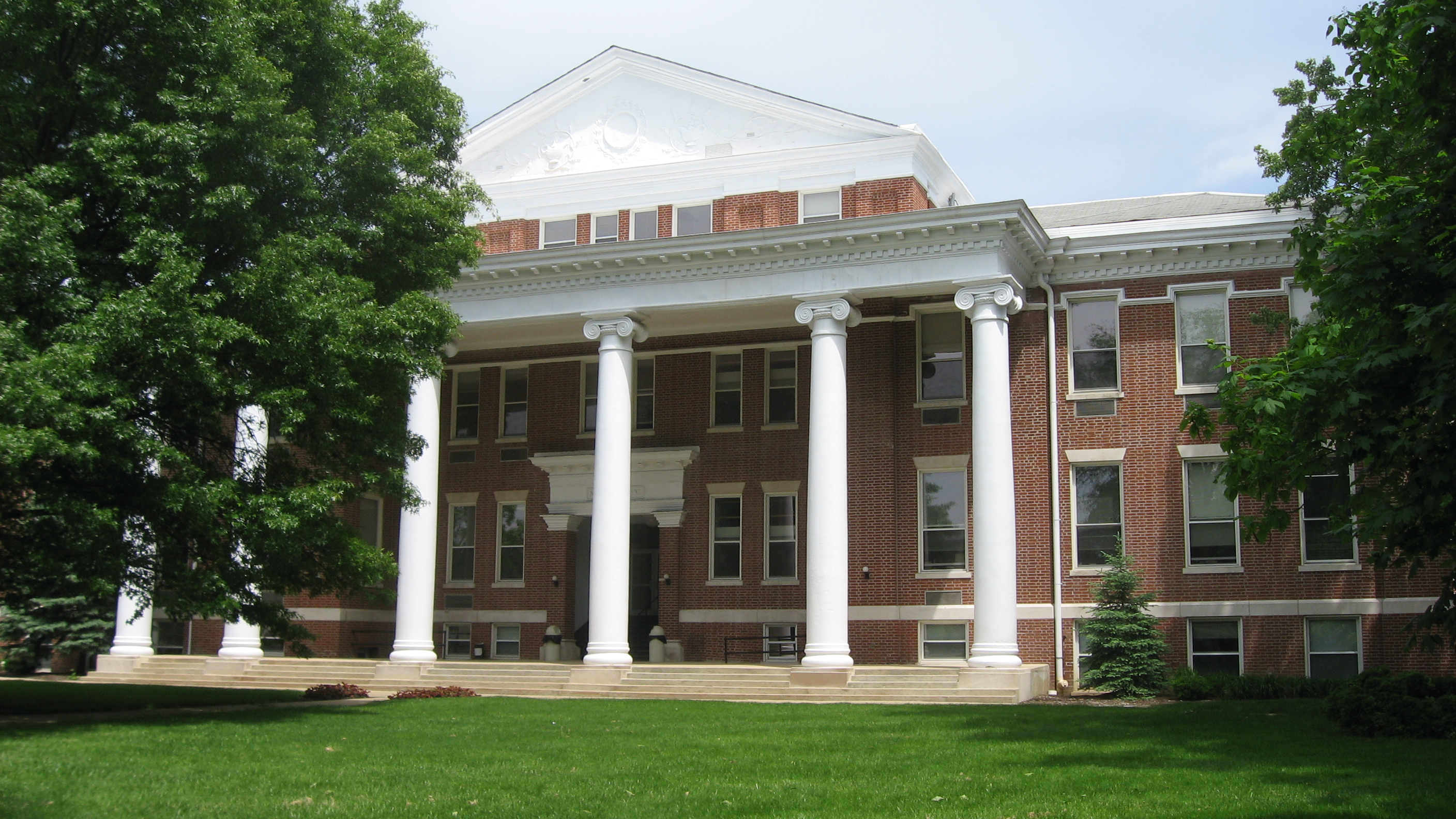
- Good Hall, University of Indianapolis, May 2010

- Location within Indianapolis Location within Indiana Location within the United States
- Location: Otterbein and Hanna Ave., Indianapolis, Indiana
- Coordinates: 39°42′29″N 86°8′7″W
- Area: 2 acres (0.81 ha)
- Built: 1904
- Architect: Ellwood, A.H., & Sons
- Architectural style: Classical Revival
- NRHP reference No.: 84001081
- Added to NRHP: March 15, 1984

Administration Building, Indiana Central University, also known as Good Hall, is a historic building located at the University of Indianapolis (originally called Indiana Central University) in Indianapolis, Indiana. It was built in 1904, and is a 3 1/2-story, Classical Revival style red-brick building. It measures approximately 127 feet by 150 feet and features a colossal two-story portico supported by Ionic order columns. It has two-story flanking wings and a porte cochere.

It was listed on the National Register of Historic Places in 1984.

== See also ==
- National Register of Historic Places listings in Marion County, Indiana
