= RB Annis School of Engineering =

Private engineering school in Indianapolis, Indiana, US

Coordinates: 39.7121°N 86.1404°W

R.B. Annis School of Engineering
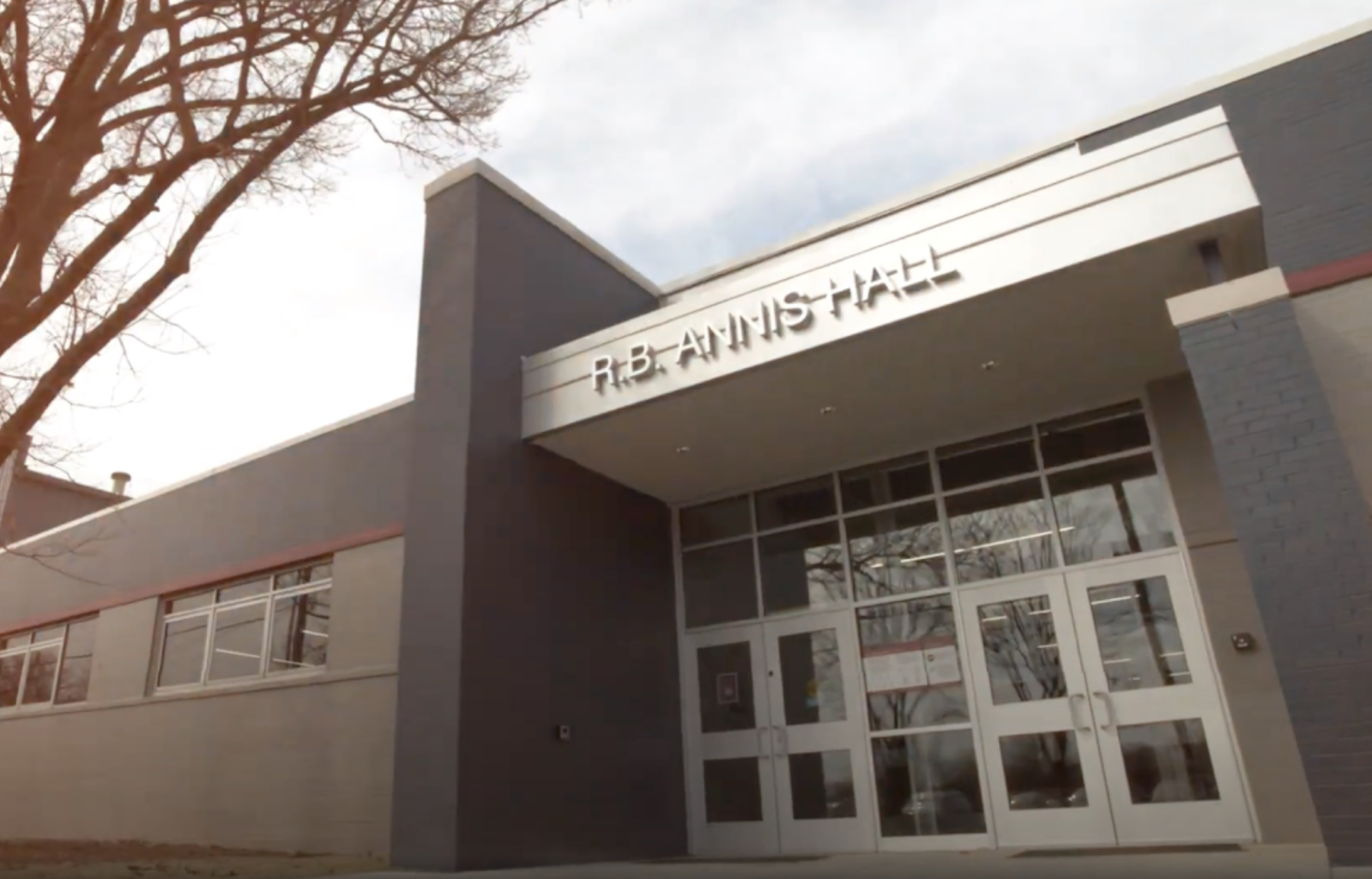
- Annis Hall, the home of the R.B. Annis School of Engineering at the University of Indianapolis
- Established: 2017
- Affiliations: University of Indianapolis
- Dean: Ken Reid (associate)
- Faculty: 12
- Undergraduates: 327 (Fall 2026)
- Location: Indianapolis, IN, US

The R.B. Annis School of Engineering, established in 2017 as a result of a $5 million gift from the R.B. Annis Educational Foundation, is an engineering school within the University of Indianapolis. The school offers BS degrees in more than a half-dozen disciplines, including computer engineering, electrical engineering, software engineering, mechanical engineering, industrial and systems engineering, computer science, and general engineering. The school currently only offers BS degrees, and so is not included in many college/school rankings, such as U.S. News & World Report, whose list of the best engineering schools only includes programs granting doctoral degrees. As of 2021, the school claims a 98% rate of students either finding jobs or being accepted to graduate school within 6 months of graduation.

== Departments ==
The R.B. Annis School of Engineering is not organized into different departments, choosing instead to have an interdisciplinary focus in its curriculum.

== DesignSpine ==
Relatively few elective courses are offered at the R.B. Annis School of Engineering. This is the result of a curriculum that relies heavily on interdisciplinary teams of students solving problems given to them by clients. The purpose of this is to better prepare students for real industry work in engineering where teams of engineers from different fields and backgrounds are common. Industry clients are assigned to the student teams by the engineering school. The engineering school has termed this curriculum structure DesignSpine.

== History ==
After its founding in 2017, the school was housed in Martin Hall on the University of Indianapolis campus, but quickly outgrew this space. In March 2021, renovations were finished on a new engineering building called R.B. Annis Hall. This new building added 65,000 sq. ft. of space to the University and is the result of a $25 million investment from UIndy.

== Rankings ==
The school currently only offers BS degrees, and so is not included in many college/school rankings, such as U.S. News & World Report, whose list of the best engineering schools only includes programs granting doctoral degrees.
