= Pop Dreyer =

American motorcycle racer and race car builder (1898–1989)

- Born: Floyd Herbert Dreyer; November 30, 1898; Chillicothe, Ohio, U.S.
- Died: February 25, 1989 (aged 90)
- Other name: "Pop" Dreyer
- Occupations: Motorcycle racer, race car constructor, motorcycle dealer
- Years active: c. 1916–1980s
- Known for: Sidecar racing; Dreyer midget and sprint cars; founding Dreyer Cycle
- Children: 3, including Floyd "Junior" Dreyer
- Awards: Motorcycle Hall of Fame (1998); Motorsports Hall of Fame of America (2012)

Floyd Herbert Dreyer (November 30, 1898 – February 25, 1989), known throughout motorsport as "Pop" Dreyer, was an American motorcycle sidecar racer, race car constructor, and motorcycle dealer. He was among the leading American sidecar competitors of the late 1910s and early 1920s before a career-ending injury led him to Indianapolis, where he became one of the country's most prolific builders of midget and sprint cars from the 1930s through the 1950s. In 1959 he opened one of the first Honda motorcycle dealerships in the United States, a business that remains in operation under his descendants.

Dreyer has been inducted into the Motorcycle Hall of Fame, the Motorsports Hall of Fame of America, the National Sprint Car Hall of Fame, and the National Midget Racing Hall of Fame. His surname survives in Dreyer & Reinbold Racing, the IndyCar team founded by his grandson Dennis Reinbold.

== Early life ==
Dreyer was born in Chillicothe, Ohio, on November 30, 1898, and raised on a farm near Youngstown. Maintaining farm equipment gave him an early working knowledge of gasoline engines. When he was in his early teens his older brother bought a motorcycle; by most accounts Dreyer rode it more than his brother did, and he soon took a part-time job at a Youngstown motorcycle dealership.

== Motorcycle racing ==
Invited to ride in a sidecar race at the dealership, Dreyer placed in his first outing and quickly established himself as one of the leading American sidecar competitors. He rode an Indian motorcycle fitted with a Flxible sidecar — a hinged design that allowed the machine to lean through corners — and at one point held contracts with both the Flxible Sidecar Company of Loudonville, Ohio, and Indian. He won national races and championships sanctioned by the Motorcycle & Allied Trades Association, the predecessor of the American Motorcyclist Association, competing on dirt tracks and on the board speedways of the period, and also entered hillclimbs.

On Labor Day 1921, at a race in East Palestine, Ohio, Dreyer's rig collided at speed with another sidecar and both machines went through the outside fence. Dreyer's passenger, Jeff Mapes, was killed. Dreyer suffered a broken back and temporary paralysis. (Note: Sources differ on the sequence: the Motorsports Hall of Fame of America biography places Dreyer's broken back in the same 1921 crash that killed Mapes, while the AMA Motorcycle Hall of Fame biography describes the back injury as occurring roughly a year later.) He returned to competition after a long rehabilitation but retired at the end of the 1923 season, in part because he was by then the sole provider for a wife and three children.

== Indianapolis and Duesenberg ==
Hearing that welders were well paid in the Oklahoma oil fields, Dreyer set out west with his family but ran out of money in central Indiana. He stayed, and took work as a welder with the Duesenberg automobile company, building headers and other components for the firm's racing cars. (Note: Accounts vary as to the year: family sources and the Indiana historical marker place the move around 1923, while a 2016 IndyCar.com feature gives 1926 as the year he took the welding job.) He was part of the Duesenberg effort at the Indianapolis 500 in the late 1920s.

During 1927–28 Dreyer contributed to Frank Lockhart's Stutz Black Hawk land speed record car, fabricating its elaborate aluminum intercooler and assisting body builder Myron Stevens. After the Duesenberg racing shop closed, he opened his own metalworking and welding business in Indianapolis, where his early work included manifolds for Arthur Chevrolet's Fronty-Ford engines.

== Race car construction ==
Through the 1930s and 1940s, Dreyer built complete sprint cars and midgets as well as racing components, and he was reported to have built more race cars than any of his contemporaries. He is credited as a pioneer of lightweight magnesium wheels, driver headrests, and overhead-valve conversions for Ford blocks. He adapted Indian motorcycle engines for midget racing; an Indian-powered Dreyer Special driven by Harold Shaw won the first Midwest Indoor Auto Racing Association event, held at Chicago's 124th Field Artillery Armory in 1933. His prominence in the discipline earned him the nickname "Pop," sometimes rendered as "Poppa of the Midgets."

Dreyer-built sprint cars won the 1938 AAA Eastern championship with Duke Nalon driving and the 1949 AAA Midwestern championship with Jackie Holmes. Other drivers who campaigned Dreyer cars included Tony Bettenhausen, Bill Schindler, Andy Linden, Joe James, Travis "Spider" Webb, Elmer George, Everett Saylor, and Ed Elisian. Dreyer also worked on Indianapolis 500 cars; according to his grandson Mike Dreyer he built or bodied all three cars that made up the front row of the 1931 Indianapolis 500.

Beginning in 1933, Dreyer manufactured small single-cylinder cars for children, marketed as Dreyer Junior Racers and known in the family as "Dreyerettes," which he advertised in Popular Mechanics and shipped in kit form; his grandson has said one was built for Shirley Temple. During World War II Dreyer subcontracted for the Allison division of General Motors, building manifolds used in testing and experimental work on aircraft engines.

== Motorcycle dealerships ==
By the early 1950s, the cost of racing had risen sharply, and Dreyer sold his racing business, including his patterns. He returned to motorcycles, opening a BMW dealership in Indianapolis in 1953 and building fiberglass-bodied sidecars for police departments and private customers. In 1959, he added Honda, becoming the company's ninth dealer in the United States and its first east of the Mississippi River. The business, Dreyer Cycle, is described by the family as the oldest continuously operated Honda dealership in the country.

== Later life and death ==
Dreyer maintained a dirt scrambles course near Mount Meridian in south-central Indiana, which he groomed himself and where his grandchildren rode. He remained an active motorcyclist into his eighties, touring to BMW rallies and performing sidecar stunts at Midwestern events. A sign in his shop reading "When all else fails, ask Pop" reflected his standing among racers who sought him out for advice. He received the American Motorcyclist Association's Dudley Perkins Award in 1986 and died on February 25, 1989, at the age of 90.

== Legacy and honors ==
Dreyer's son Floyd "Junior" Dreyer worked on Indianapolis 500 crews for drivers including Bill Holland and Lloyd Ruby, and later operated the family motorcycle business with his son Mike. Another grandson, Dennis Reinbold, founded Dreyer & Reinbold Racing in 1999 and has said he retained the Dreyer name to carry on his grandfather's legacy.

Mike Dreyer published a biography, They Called Him Pop: The Floyd "Pop" Dreyer Story, in 2000. In 2018, the Indiana Racing Memorial Association erected a historical marker at the site of Dreyer's Indianapolis shop.

Honors include:

- National Sprint Car Hall of Fame
- National Midget Racing Hall of Fame
- Motorcycle Hall of Fame, 1998
- Dudley Perkins Award, 1986
- Motorsports Hall of Fame of America, 2012 (Historic category)
