= Tanuja (name) =

Tanuja is a given name. Notable people with the name include:

- Ashani Tanuja Weeraratna, American-South African cancer researcher
- Tanuja (born 1943), Indian film actress
- Tanuja Chandra, Indian film director and writer
- Tanuja Desai Hidier, American writer
- Tanuja Singh, Indian academic administrator
