= Dennis Reinbold =

American automobile dealer and IndyCar team owner (1961–2026)

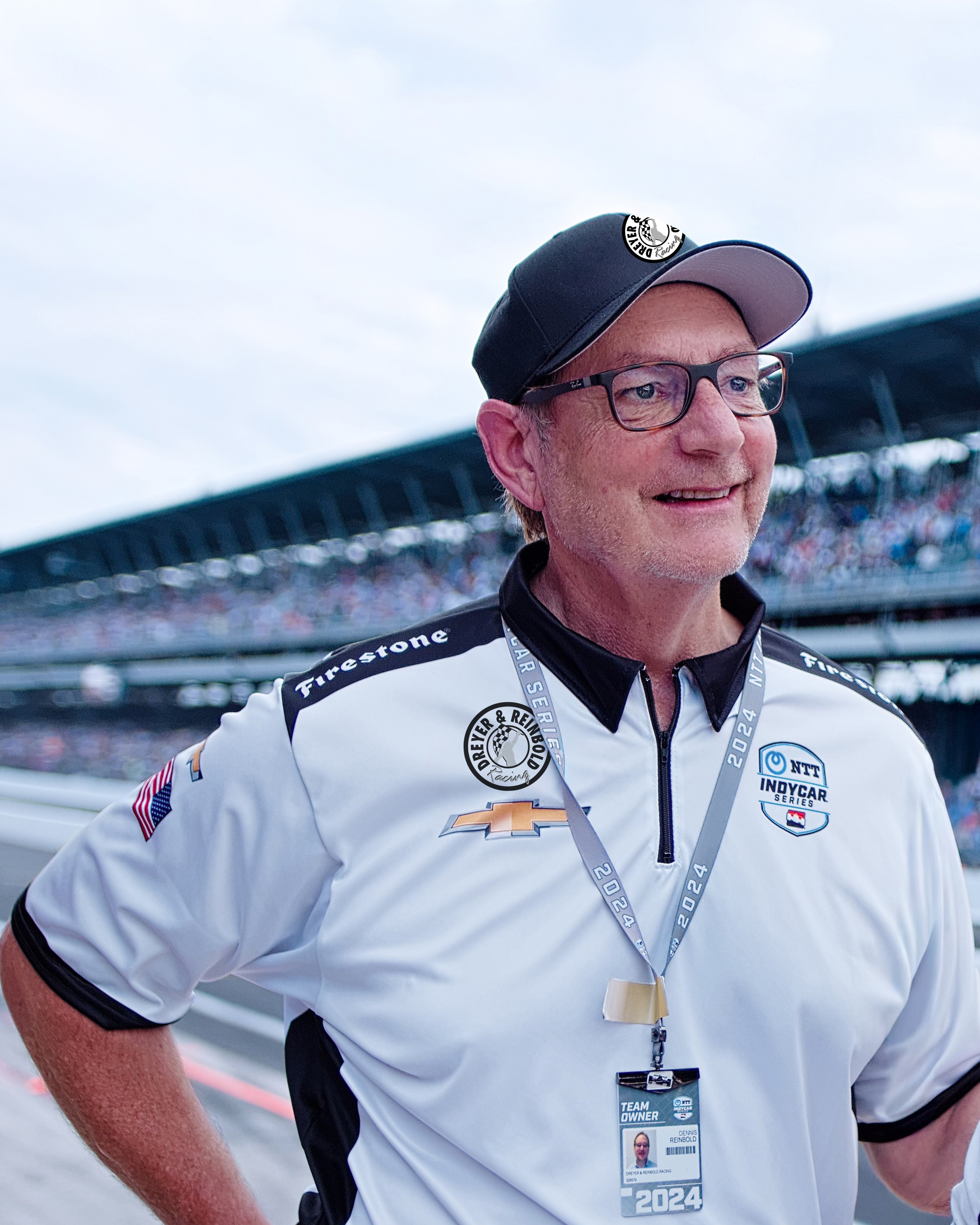
- Reinbold at the 2024 Indianapolis 500
- Born: Dennis Jay Reinbold; April 2, 1961; Indianapolis, Indiana, U.S.
- Died: June 13, 2026 (aged 65); Carmel, Indiana, U.S.
- Education: University of Indianapolis
- Occupations: Automobile dealer, motorsport team owner
- Known for: Founder and owner of Dreyer & Reinbold Racing
- Spouse: Jennifer Mundel (m. 1987)

Dennis Jay Reinbold (April 2, 1961 – June 13, 2026) was an American automobile dealer and motorsport team owner. He operated a group of automobile dealerships in the Indianapolis metropolitan area and in 1999 founded Dreyer & Reinbold Racing, which competed in the IndyCar Series and entered cars in the Indianapolis 500 for more than 25 years.

== Early life and education ==
Reinbold was born in Indianapolis on April 2, 1961, and grew up on the city's west side, less than 2 miles (3.2 km) from the Indianapolis Motor Speedway. He has said that hearing the cars from his childhood home and riding his bicycle to the Speedway were among his earliest memories of the sport.

Reinbold's maternal grandfather was Floyd "Pop" Dreyer, a former factory motorcycle racer who served as a crew member and chief mechanic on the Duesenberg driven by Benny Shoaff and Babe Stapp in the 1927 Indianapolis 500, and who later built Indianapolis 500 cars in the 1930s as well as sprint cars and midget racers.

Reinbold played baseball at the University of Indianapolis and later with the semi-professional Plainfield Patriots.

== Automobile business ==
Reinbold led the Dreyer & Reinbold group of automobile dealerships in central Indiana, which held franchises including BMW, Infiniti, Volkswagen, Mini and Subaru. The group's locations included a Subaru dealership in Greenwood, Indiana.

== Dreyer & Reinbold Racing ==
Reinbold formed Dreyer & Reinbold Racing in 1999, naming the team in part for his grandfather. The team won its first Indy Racing League start, the season-opening race at Walt Disney World Speedway in January 2000, with Robbie Buhl driving; that remained its only victory in the series.

The team competed full-time in the series through 2012 and ran a partial schedule in 2013 before concentrating on the Indianapolis 500, with the exception of a four-race program for Sage Karam in the shortened 2020 season. Drivers who competed for the team included Al Unser Jr., Buddy Lazier, Buddy Rice, Sarah Fisher, Simon Pagenaud, Paul Tracy, Justin Wilson, J. R. Hildebrand, Conor Daly and Ryan Hunter-Reay.

The team's best finish in the Indianapolis 500 was fourth, by Oriol Servià in 2012. In the 2025 Indianapolis 500, Hunter-Reay led 48 laps before running out of fuel with 31 laps remaining while running at the front. At the time of Reinbold's death, every car the team had entered in the Indianapolis 500 — 53 in total — had qualified for the race, a record he cited as a particular source of pride.

Reinbold served on the board of directors of the 500 Festival from 2002 to 2008.

In July 2026, a month after Reinbold's death, the team purchased an IndyCar charter from Rahal Letterman Lanigan Racing in order to return to full-time competition in 2027; team owner Bobby Rahal said the sale reflected Reinbold's long-standing interest in acquiring a charter, which he had discussed before his death.

== Other activities ==
Beginning in 2005, Reinbold co-wrote songs with Bob Corn, recording in Nashville with producer Ben Fowler. In 2024, one of their songs was recorded by a country artist. He was also a woodworker.

== Personal life and death ==
Reinbold lived in Carmel, Indiana. He was married to Jennifer Reinbold, a former professional tennis player who reached the singles quarterfinals at the 1983 Wimbledon Championships, and had two sons, Derek and Graham.

Reinbold died on June 13, 2026, at the age of 65. His death came weeks after the 2026 Indianapolis 500, in which his team had fielded multiple entries.
