= University of Indianapolis =

Private university in Indianapolis, Indiana, US

- Former names: Indiana Central University (1902–1921); Indiana Central College (1921–1975); Indiana Central University (1975–1986)
- Motto: Education for Service
- Type: Private university
- Established: 1902; 124 years ago
- Academic affiliations: NAICU; CIC; IAMSCU
- Endowment: $134 – $140 million (2022)
- Budget: $80 million
- President: Tanuja Singh
- Provost: Chris Plouff
- Faculty: 600
- Students: 5,638 (spring 2022)
- Undergraduates: 4,271
- Postgraduates: 1,367
- Location: Indianapolis, Indiana, U.S. 39°42′35″N 86°08′6.5″W
- Campus: 50 acres (20 ha); Suburban
- Colors: Crimson and grey
- Nickname: Greyhounds
- Sporting affiliations: NCAA Division II – GLVC
- Website: uindy.edu

The University of Indianapolis (UIndy) is a private university in Indianapolis, Indiana, United States, affiliated with the United Methodist Church. It offers associate, bachelor's, master's, and doctoral degrees. It was founded in 1902 as Indiana Central University and was popularly known as Indiana Central College from 1921 until 1975. In 1986 the name was changed to University of Indianapolis.

The main campus is located on the south side of Indianapolis at 1400 East Hanna Avenue, just east of Shelby Street. The campus straddles the Carson Heights and University Heights neighborhoods of Indianapolis. UIndy's international partnerships include joint programs with Ningbo Institute of Technology, Zhejiang University (China) and Zhejiang Yuexiu University of Foreign Languages (China) UIndy also maintains articulation agreements with local universities such as Franklin College (Franklin, IN), Indiana University (Kokomo, IN), and Ivy Tech Community College (all locations statewide).

Previous international partnerships included Galen University in Belize.

The university's colors are crimson and grey. Its athletic teams, known as the Greyhounds, are members of the Great Lakes Valley Conference (GLVC) in the NCAA Division II.

== History ==
History at a glance
• Indiana Central University (Chartered: 1902)
• Opened: 1905 — Affiliation: United Brethren in Christ
• Indiana Central College (Renamed: 1921)
• Church merger: 1946 — Affiliation: Evangelical United Brethren
• Church merger: 1969 — Affiliation: United Methodist Church
• Indiana Central University (Renamed: 1975)
• University of Indianapolis (Renamed: 1986)

In the early 20th century William L. Elder, an Indianapolis real estate developer, offered the Church of the United Brethren in Christ eight acres (3.2 ha) of real estate southeast of downtown Indianapolis to establish a college in exchange for help selling 446 parcels of land around the donated acreage. While the land was not sold, the college opened anyway. Indiana Central University was chartered in 1902, but instruction did not start until September 26, 1905, when the first building, Good Hall, was completed.

The school opened with three divisions and eight departments. The three divisions included the academy, which offered high school courses; the normal school, which provided a two-year program of teacher education; and the liberal arts college. The departments included the College of Liberal Arts, Teachers’ College, Conservatory of Music, School of Oratory, School of Commerce, Bible Institute, School of Arts, and the academy, in which students completed their preparatory work and earned high school diplomas.

While established as Indiana Central University (ICU), the school was colloquially known as Indiana Central College (ICC) from 1921 to 1975. The North Central Association of Schools and Colleges accredited the university in March 1947. Academic administration was restructured to group programs into colleges and schools, and the institution returned to using the Indiana Central University name from 1976 to 1986. The initials "ICU" can still be seen in brick on the front side of Krannert Memorial Library on campus. In 1986, the university adopted the name University of Indianapolis.

== Academics ==
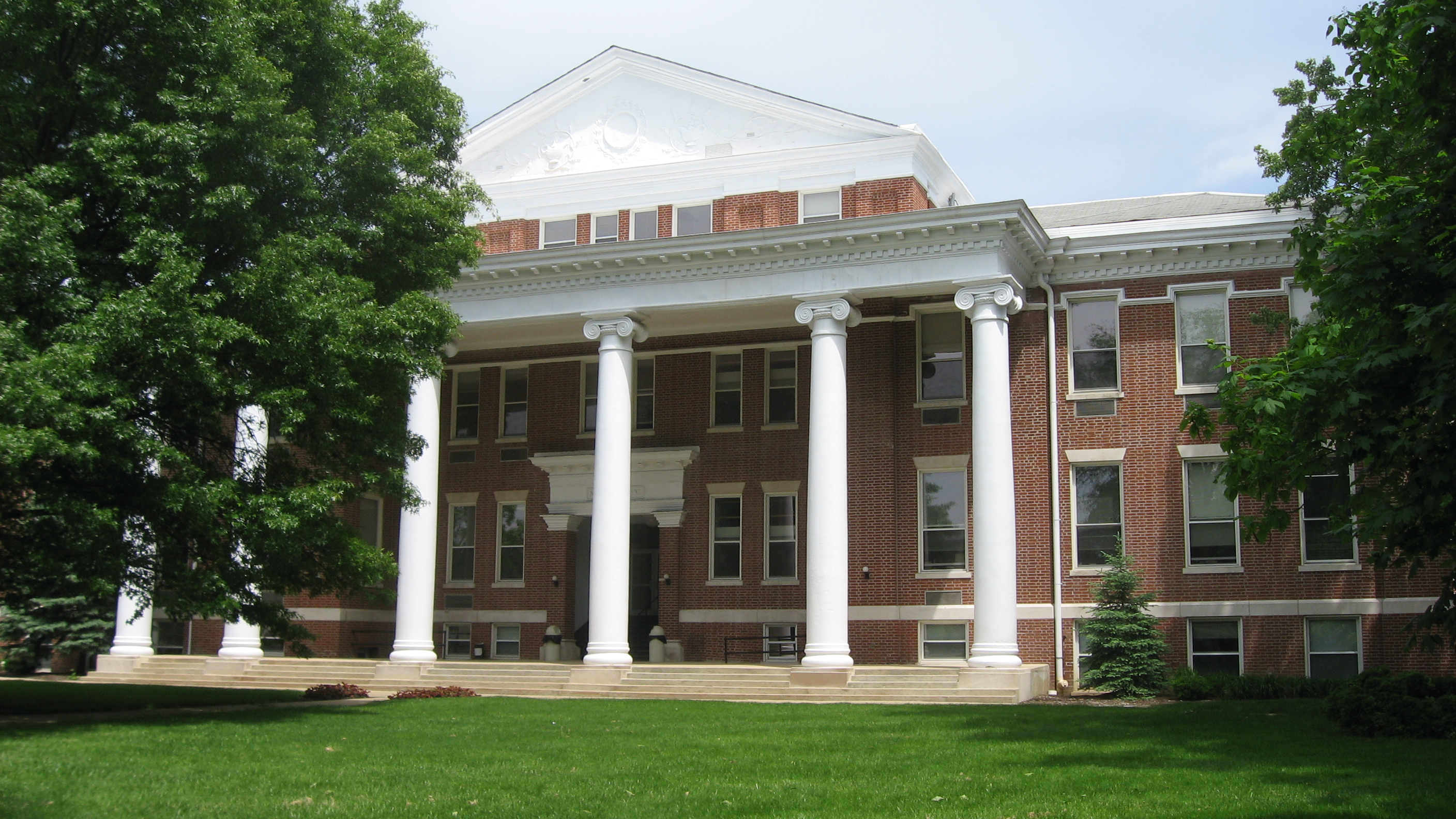
Good Hall (1905), the university's original building, is the oldest building in Indianapolis in continuous use for educational purposes.

=== Schools and colleges ===
The University of Indianapolis offers 90+ undergraduate majors leading to either a bachelor's degree (four-year program) or an associate degree (two-year program). Students may also enroll in several pre-professional programs and over forty graduate programs. The university is organized into the following schools and colleges:

- School of Business
- School of Education
- School of Nursing
- School of Occupational Therapy
- Krannert School of Physical Therapy
- R.B. Annis School of Engineering
- College of Education & Behavioral Sciences
- College of Health Sciences
- Shaheen College of Arts & Sciences
- School of Psychology
- Phylis Lan Lin School of Social Work and Counseling

=== Centers and Institutes ===
UIndy has the following centers and institutes:

- Center for Aging & Community (CAC)
- Center of Excellence in Leadership of Learning (CELL)
- Stephen F. Fry Pro Edge
- Institute for Civic Leadership & Mayoral Archives
- Institute for Leadership & Professional Development
- Center for Collaborative Innovation
- Center for Data Science
- Center for Ethics
- Center for First-Year Experience & Student Success
- Center for Service Learning & Community Engagement
- Christel DeHaan Center for Global Engagement
- Gender Center
- Metropolitan Indianapolis - Central Indiana Area Health Education Center
- Sease Institute

=== Admissions statistics ===
For fall 2014, UIndy received 5,313 freshmen applications; 4,486 were admitted (84%) and 830 enrolled. For enrolled freshmen, the middle 50% range of SAT scores were 450–550 for critical reading, 460–560 for math, and 440–540 for writing. The middle 50% range of the ACT scores were 19–25 for composite, 19–26 for math, and 19–25 for English.

== Student life ==
As of 2019, UIndy had about 5,550 students on its main campus, of which 1,400 were graduate students.

As of Fall 2015, the student body was 63 percent female and 37 percent male. The student body was 49% White/Non-Hispanic, 12% Black/African-American, 9% Hispanic/Latino, 3% Asian. 44 U.S. states and 68 countries are represented among students on campus. Nine percent of undergraduates and nearly seven percent of graduate students are international students. Overall, 25 percent international and minority enrollment. Over 90% of the students attending the University of Indianapolis come from within the state of Indiana. 57% of undergraduate students are in the 18 to 22 age bracket.

=== Media ===
The Reflector is the University of Indianapolis's student newspaper. The student-run serial publication has over 100 years of uninterrupted reporting on campus and today operates in print and online. The first issue was published on November 15, 1922, to approximately 250 students and faculty on the campus of Indiana Central College.

WICR (88.7) is an 8,000 watt, Class B public radio station at the University of Indianapolis that broadcasts to listeners in the Indianapolis metropolitan area. It is a campus radio station. The station began broadcasting in 1962 with ten watts of power.

WIX (UIndy TV) is a student television station. Students produce news and entertainment programming for distribution on campus cable channel 5 and on the Comcast and Bright House Networks in Marion County, Indiana. The University of Indianapolis was named Indiana Association of School Broadcasters TV School of the Year in 2008.

Etchings Press is the UIndy's teaching press and publishing laboratory. Students produce Etchings Literary and Fine Arts Magazine bi-annually, which celebrated its 30th birthday in 2018. The students also judge the Whirling Prize each fall for books published in the past two years that respond to the contest theme and publish three books each spring through Etchings Press' Chapbook and Novella Prize. More information can be found in their press release.

== Campus ==
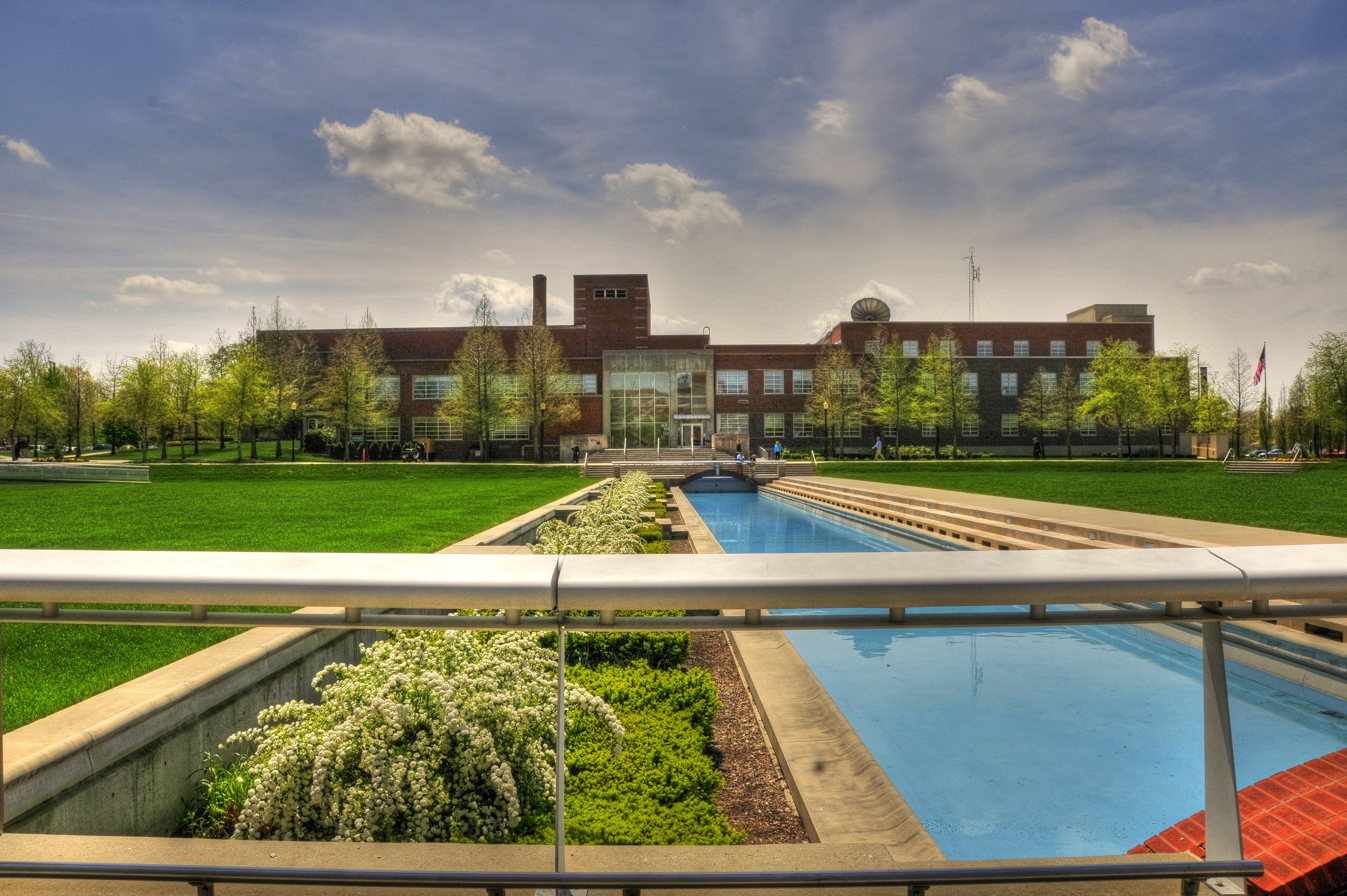
Smith Mall with Esch Hall in the distance

=== Smith Mall ===
From the 1960s through the 1990s, the most prominent physical feature of the campus was the central parking lot which was framed by a quadrangle of buildings. In 1998 the University of Indianapolis hired Odle McGuire Shook to re-purpose the 5.2 acres into green space and later named the area Smith Mall. The mall is made up of a circular sunken lawn, a recessed long canal, water gardens, and the partial arc of an amphitheater.

=== Academic buildings ===
- Christel DeHaan Fine Arts Center
- Esch Hall
- Good Hall
- Krannert Memorial Library
- Lilly Science Hall
- Martin Hall
- Schwitzer Student Center
- R.B. Annis Hall (School of Engineering)
- Ruth Lilly Fitness Center and Nicoson Hall
- Richard E. Stierwalt Alumni House
- UIndy Health Pavilion

=== Residential buildings ===
- Greyhound Village Apartments
- University Lofts
- College Crossing
- Cory Bretz Hall
- Central Hall
- Crowe Hall
- East Hall
- Cravens Hall
- Roberts Hall
- Warren Hall

=== Athletics facilities ===
- Athletics & Recreation Center (ARC)
- Baumgartner Field
- Greyhound Park
- Key Field at Key Stadium
- Skillman Court at Nicoson Hall
- Tennis Center
- Ruth Lilly Center for Health and Fitness

== Safety ==
The University of Indianapolis Police Department is a campus police force that oversees security. UIndy employs a full-time chief and full-time officers, all certified by the Indiana Law Enforcement Academy. Officers have full arrest powers and are licensed to carry firearms. They enforce all local and state laws, in addition to university regulations.

== Athletics ==
The University of Indianapolis's athletic teams are known as the Greyhounds and participate in Division II of the NCAA. All 25 of the teams compete in the Great Lakes Valley Conference. The school's highest finish in the NACDA Directors' Cup was 2nd in 2023–24. UIndy has finished in the top 20 every year since 2006–7, including twelve top 10s in that span.

The mascot is a greyhound named Ace that is depicted in a statue in Schwitzer Student Center and represented at athletic events by a costumed mascot. Since 2019, UIndy has also had a live mascot, a retired racing greyhound named Grady. The university's song, called simply the "U of I Fight Song," was written in 1975 by James M. Stanton, at the time an Indiana Central senior. The lyrics were rewritten when the university changed its name in 1986.

== Notable alumni ==
- Harold Achor (1928) – Justice of the Indiana Supreme Court
- Jon Ackerson – lawyer and member of both houses of the Kentucky State Legislature
- Brian Barnhart (1983) – president of Harding Steinbrenner Racing and president of Race Operations for IndyCar
- Craig Bowden (1990) – professional golfer
- George Crowe (1943) – professional baseball and basketball player
- Ray Crowe (1938) – high school basketball coach whose team won Indiana state championships in 1955 and 1956, becoming the first African-American team in the nation to claim a state title. Member of Indiana State House of Representatives (1966–75) and Indianapolis City-County Council (1983–87).
- David "Big Dave" DeJernett (1935) – professional basketball player
- Adam Driver – actor
- Irene Dunne (1918 – Conservatory of Music) – actress
- Stephane Fortin – professional football player
- Victoria Garcia-Wilburn (DHS 2014) – member of the Indiana General Assembly; faculty member at IUPUI
- Matt Kohn (2005) – professional football player
- David Logan (2005) – basketball player in European leagues.
- Jordan Loyd (2016) – professional basketball player
- William Raspberry (1958) – newspaper columnist
- Dennis Reinbold (1983) – founder & owner of Dreyer & Reinbold Racing
- Irwin Sparkes and Alphonso Sharland – musician
- Walter Spencer (2004) – professional football player
- Katie R. Stam Irk – 2009 Miss America
- Andrew Werner (2009) – professional baseball player

== Presidents ==
The following persons have served as president of University of Indianapolis:

No.	President	Term start	Term end	Ref.
Presidents of Indiana Central University (1902–1921)
1	J. T. Roberts	1905	1908	
2	L. D. Bonebrake	1909	1915	
Presidents of Indiana Central College (1921–1975)
3	I. J. Good	1915	1944	
4	I. Lynd Esch	1945	June 30, 1970	
President of Indiana Central University (1975–1986)
5	Gene E. Sease	July 1, 1970	June 30, 1988	
Presidents of the University of Indianapolis (1986–present)
6	G. Benjamin Lantz Jr.	July 1, 1988	June 30, 1998	
7	Jerry M. Israel	July 1, 1998	July 4, 2005	
8	Beverley J. Pitts	July 5, 2005	June 30, 2012	
9	Robert L. Manuel	July 1, 2012	July 1, 2022 (Note: Resigned to head DePaul University in Chicago.)	
interim	Phillip Terry	July 2, 2022	June 30, 2023	
10	Tanuja Singh	July 1, 2023	present	

Table notes:
