= Gene E. Sease =

Dr. Gene Elwood Sease (June 28, 1931 – May 30, 2024) was the fifth president of the University of Indianapolis and an active leader who was instrumental in the shaping of the city of Indianapolis.

Sease died on May 30, 2024, at the age of 92.

== Early life ==
Born in the small coal mining town of Portage, Pennsylvania, Gene Sease is the youngest of five siblings and was named after the famous singing cowboy, Gene Autry. His father worked for the Portage Coal Mining Company.

Gene served a number of churches in his area, and it was while he was serving one of the churches, he met Joanne Cherry, the church pianist, who he later would marry.

Gene went to Juniata College in Huntingdon, Pennsylvania, where he received his A.B (1952). He received his M.Div. from Pittsburgh Theological Seminary (1956). He received his M.Ed. and Ph.D. from the University of Pittsburgh (1958, 1965). Shortly after college graduation, he married Joanne on July 20, 1952. Together, they had three children; David, Daniel, and Cheryl.

== The Methodist merger ==
In 1968, the Evangelical United Brethren (EUB) merged with the Methodists to create the United Methodist Church (UMC).

== University years ==
In 1968, the family moved from Pennsylvania to Indianapolis, Indiana, where Dr. Sease was named president of Indiana Central College in 1970. Dr. Sease was seen as a civic-minded educator who could use his political connections to reshape the image of the school. Gene helped the school expand towards Indianapolis, which resulted in a growth period that brought in more students as well as more diversity. With this inward city movement, he changed the name to University of Indianapolis in 1986.

Under his leadership, UIndy experienced significant growth and transformation, including the construction of the Lilly Fitness Center, Krannert Memorial Library, Key Stadium, Zerfas Wing of Lilly Hall, and New Hall (renamed Ray & George Crowe Hall in 2012). He was also instrumental in leading the name change from Indiana Central College to Indiana Central University in 1975 and again from Indiana Central University to the University of Indianapolis in 1986.

The administrative wing attached to Krannert Memorial Library was renamed the Sease Wing in honor of Dr. Gene Sease in 2001.

== The family business ==
In 1988, Dr. Gene E. Sease started a public relations firm, Sease Gerig & Associates with his oldest son David and business partner Lou Gerig. Together, the three have continued to manage one of the oldest public relations firm in Indianapolis.

== Indiana State Fair ==
Dr. Gene E. Sease was appointed as the Indiana State Fair Commission Chairman in 2000 by Governor Frank O'Bannon and again in 2003 by Governor Mitch Daniels. Gene was most noted for helping with the renovation of the 4-H Educational Complex.

== Volunteer positions ==
- President of the Kiwanis Club of Indianapolis, Inc. (1977)
- 500 Festival Chairman (1978)
- Board of Directors, Greater Indianapolis Chamber of Commerce
