= Tanuja Singh =

Indian academic administrator

Tanuja Singh is an Indian academic administrator who began serving as the tenth president of the University of Indianapolis in 2023. She was previously the provost at Loyola University New Orleans.

== Life ==
Singh earned a M.Sc. in physics from the University of Allahabad. She completed a M.B.A. from Millsaps College. She received a D.B.A. at the Southern Illinois University.

For thirteen years, Singh worked at the Northern Illinois University where she was a department chair and professor of marketing. She later worked as the dean of the Greehey School of Business at St. Mary's University, Texas for eleven years. At Loyola University New Orleans, Singh was the provost and senior vice president of academic affairs. On July 1, 2023, Singh became the tenth president of the University of Indianapolis, succeeding interim president Phil Terry. She is the first woman of color to hold the position.
