= Ed Hardy (brand) =

American fashion brand

Ed Hardy is an American fashion brand based on the work of American tattoo artist Don Ed Hardy. It is owned by Iconix Brand Group, while Don Ed Hardy retains a 15% minority stake.

== History ==
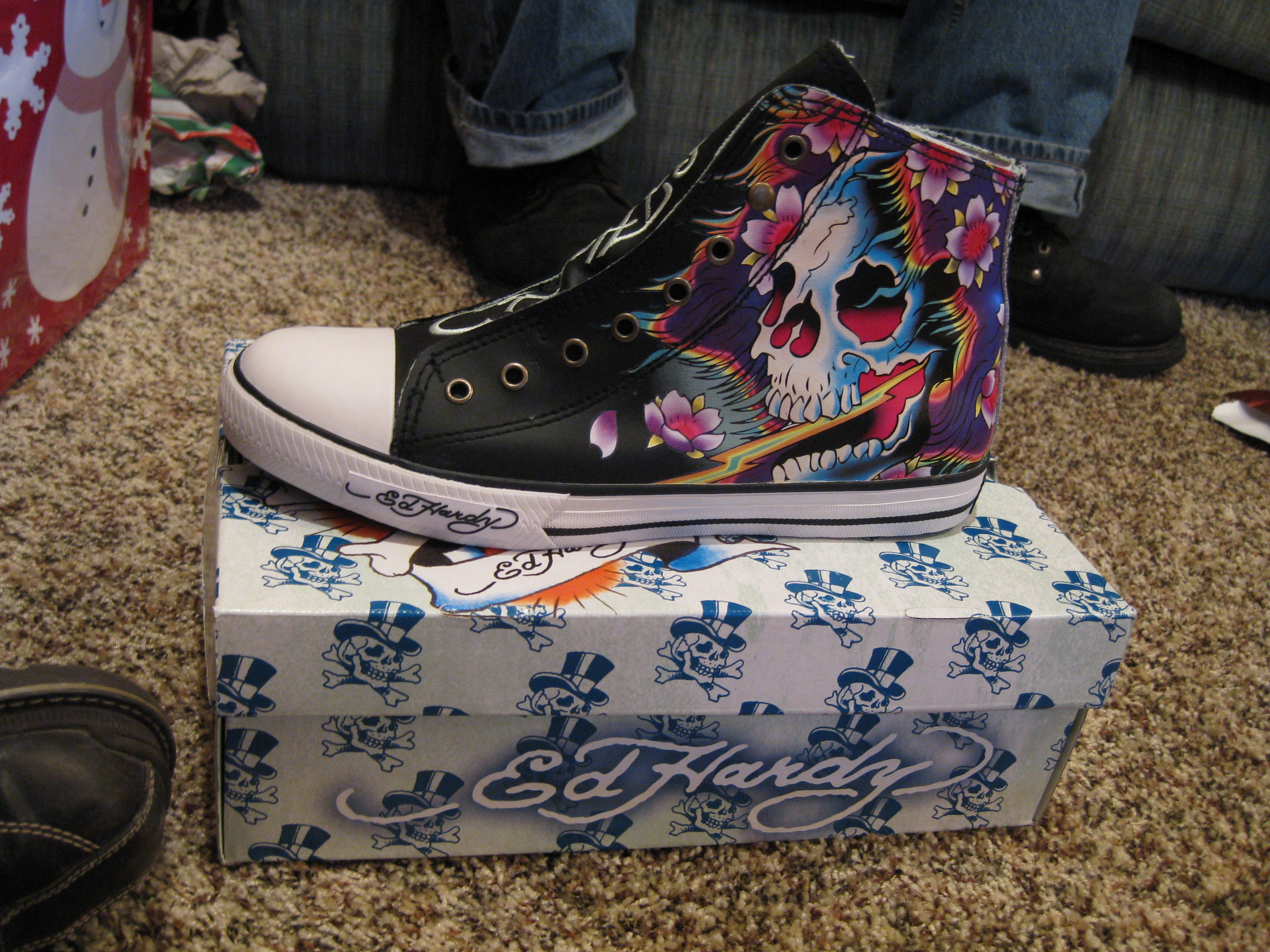
2008 Ed Hardy brand shoe

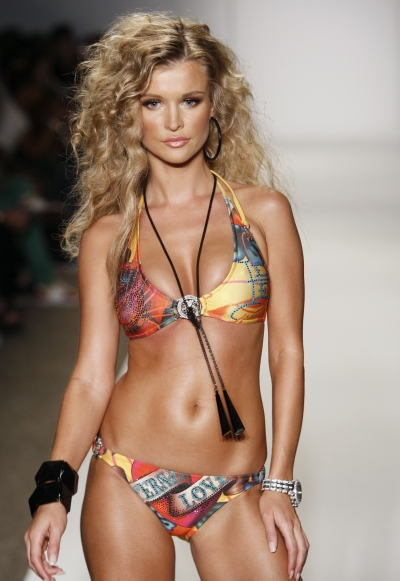
Ed Hardy swimsuit

In the early 2000s, Hardy licensed Ku USA, Inc. to produce a clothing line based on his artwork. Hardy and Ku USA formed Hardy Life, now Hardy Way LLC, which owns the Ed Hardy brand and trademarks. The brand has subsequently been extensively licensed, at one point having 70 sublicensees, selling clothing, accessories, lighters, perfume, hair styling tools, and condoms.

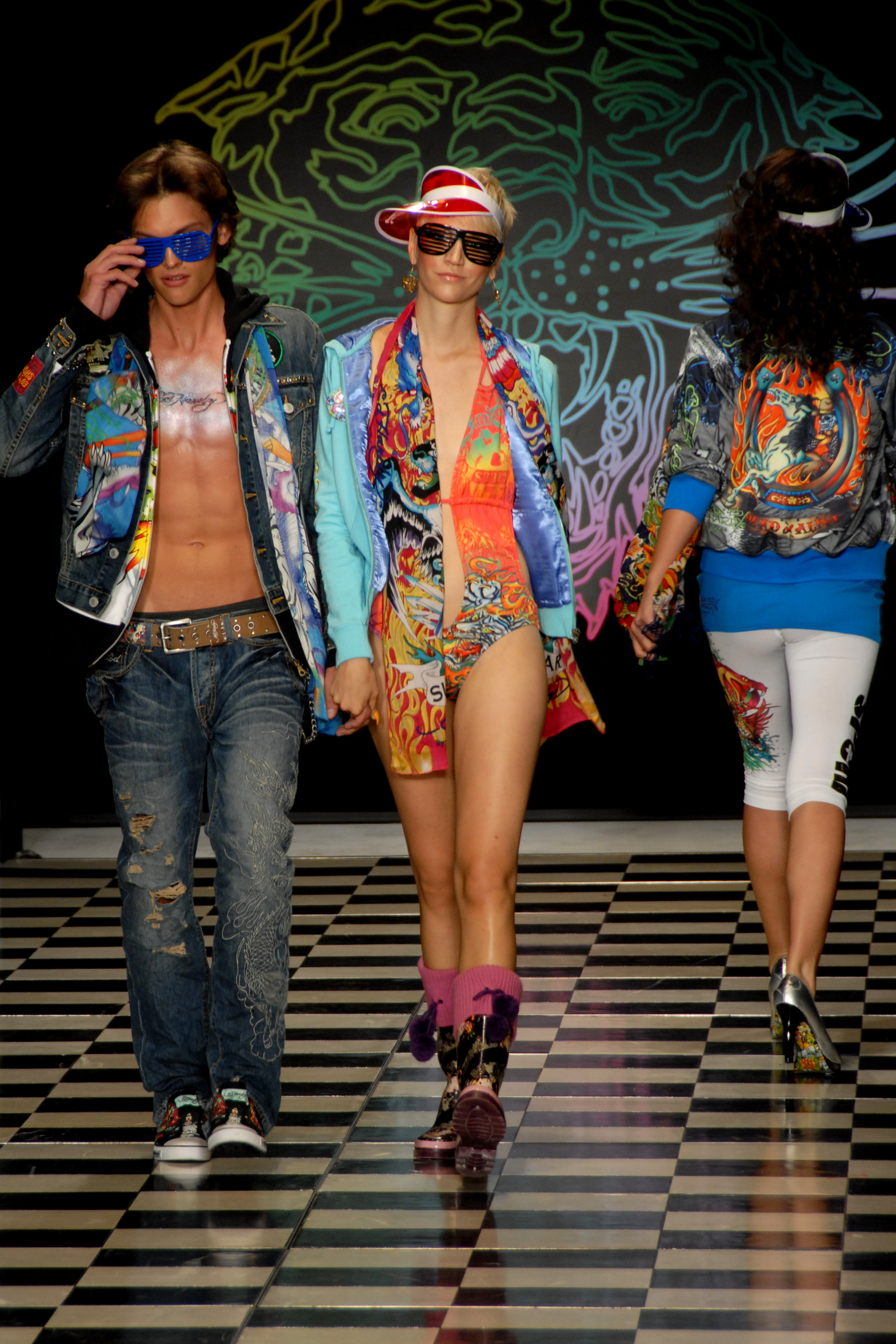
Models on the runway for Ed Hardy Fashion show during Los Angeles Fashion Week in 2008

The most famous licensee was Christian Audigier, previously of Von Dutch Originals, which marketed the imagery of Kenny Howard (aka Von Dutch), another noted American subculture artist. Audigier licensed the worldwide rights to the Ed Hardy brand in 2005 through his holding company, Nervous Tattoo, and employed the marketing techniques employed by Von Dutch Originals, marketing directly to celebrity clients and by opening stores in high-profile fashion districts. Ed Hardy stores were located in San Francisco, New York, Los Angeles, Boston, Seattle, Minneapolis, Honolulu, Scottsdale, Tucson, Vancouver, Dubai, Johannesburg, Kuwait, Kuala Lumpur, Bangkok, Gurgaon, Delhi, Mumbai, and Qatar.

The face of the brand (from 2008) was Sarah Larson. The brand gained significant popularity under Audigier, peaking at more than $700 million in gross revenue in 2009, but collapsed quickly in the following two years, leading to the closure of many stores. Among others, the Australian sublicensee of Ed Hardy (owned and operated by Gary Berman) entered administration and closed in 2010.

Hardy blamed the collapse on creative and marketing decisions by Audigier, such as Audigier featuring his own name prominently on branded items (on one item 14 times, compared to Hardy's once), and prominent association with short-lived reality TV celebrity Jon Gosselin. Following legal battles, Hardy regained control of the brand in 2010, though as part of the settlement Nervous remained a licensee for T-shirts, hats, and hoodies.

In May 2009, Iconix Brand Group announced it had acquired a 50 percent interest in Hardy Way, LLC, the owner of the Ed Hardy brand and trademarks, which it increased to 85% in 2011. Hardy retains a 15% minority stake.

In 2018, the brand successfully relaunched in Europe, and collaborations were presented with Missguided and Illustrated People amongst other brands, the latter sold via Selfridges, ASOS and Topshop. In 2019, the brand had collaboration with Rose In Good Faith.

In LA in 2024, Ed Hardy held its first fashion show.
