= Bobber (motorcycle) =

Type of customised motorcycle

A bobber, originally called a bob-job from the 1930s through 1990s, is a style of custom motorcycle. The typical construction lightens the bike by removing the front fender, "bobbing" the rear fender (as in bob-tail), and stripping excess bodywork and superfluous parts. With the result being a minimalist design ethos and visual aesthetic.

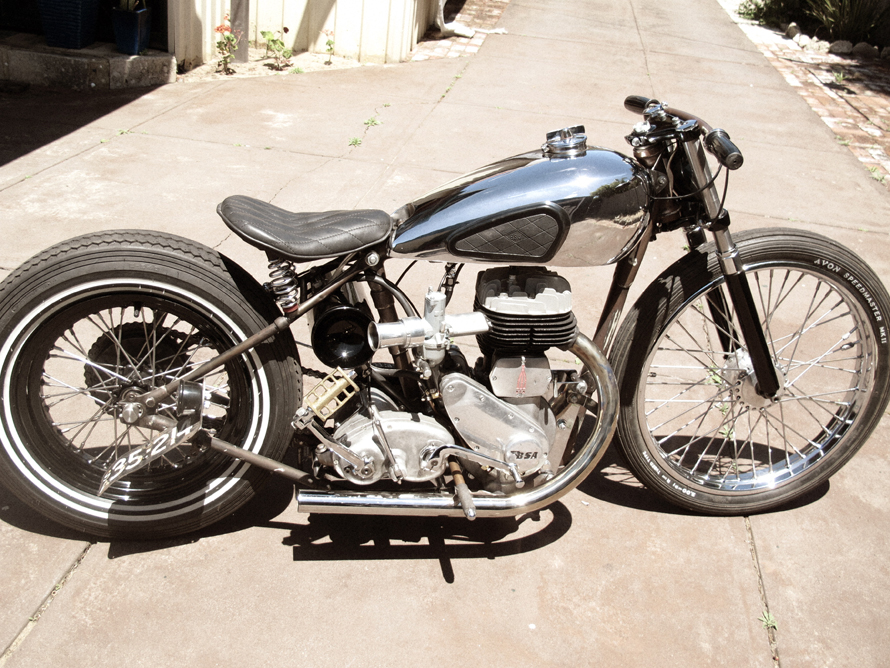
A bobber based on the 1937-1955 BSA M20

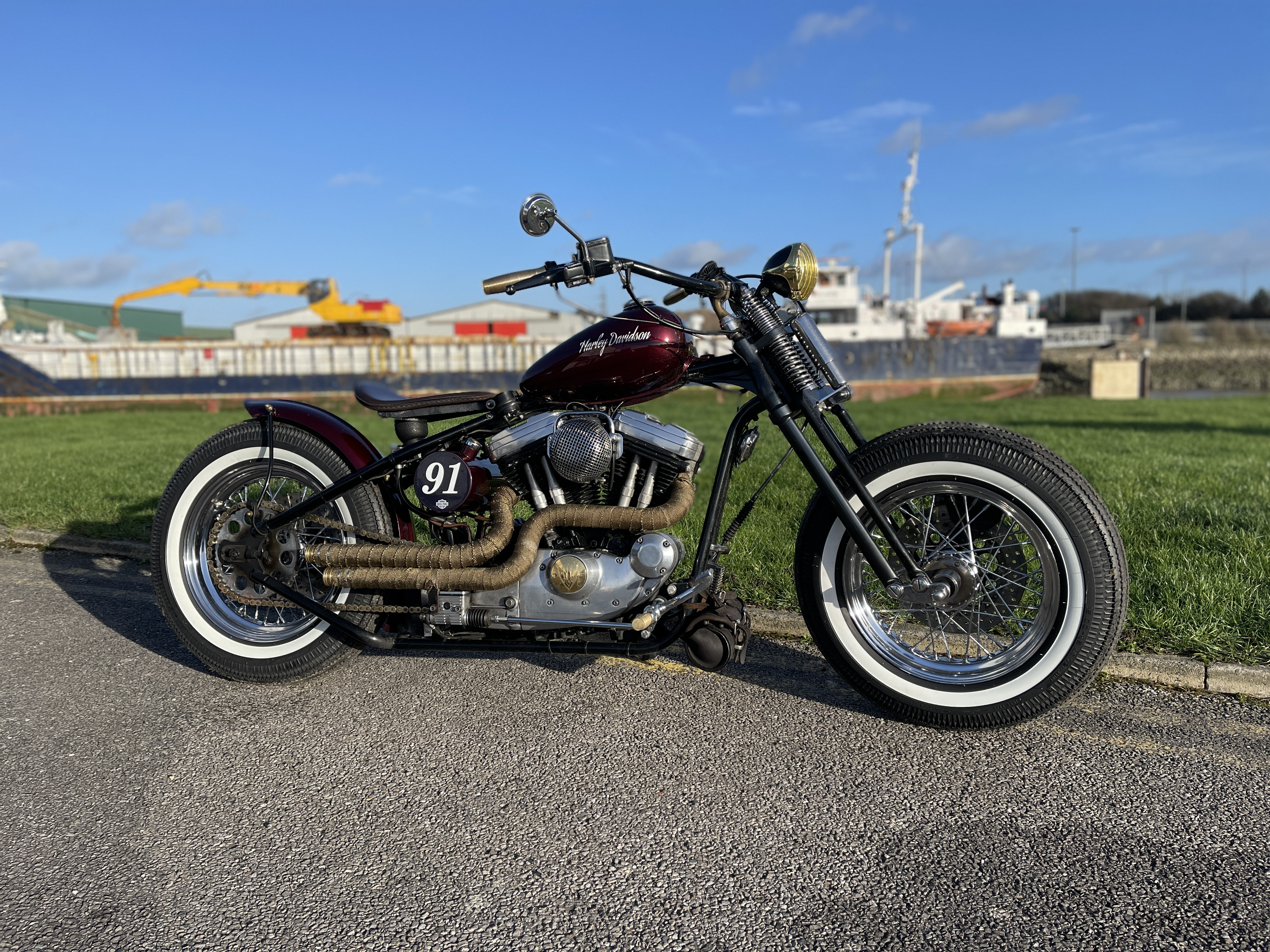
A modern Harley-Davidson 1200-based bobber

== History ==
The bob-job evolved from an earlier type of American custom motorcycle, the 'Cut Down', which appeared in the late 1920s, and which was based on the Harley-Davidson 'J' series v-twin. The cut-down was created to modernize the appearance and improve the performance of the aging J-series. The motorcycle was significantly lightened by removing the front fender, shortening the rear, and removing all excess accessories. The cut-down was also characterized by a modified frame, in which the seat tube was lowered and the wheelbase shortened, resulting in a lower, shorter machine, with a sweeping diagonal line between the steering head and rear axle.

In 1933 the AMA introduced Class C racing, which restricted sanctioned competition to catalogued racing motorcycles, with points gained towards the National Championship. Class C racers such as the Indian Daytona Scout and Harley-Davidson WLDR and WR were the inspiration of the 'bob-job'; these stripped-down racers had no front fender, an abbreviated rear, and no excess weight. Road riders directly copied the look of the racers for better performance and a measure of style. The first bob-jobs appeared in the mid-1930s, and tended to reflect their somber competition origins, with plain paint jobs and no extra chrome or decoration.

Immediately after World War II, bob-jobs, in parallel with hot rods, were subject to increasingly decorative modifications, including extra chrome plating, metal flake paint jobs, pin striping, and colored upholstery. As early as 1946, Kenneth Howard ('Von Dutch') began modifying his Indian Scout bob-job with wild paint jobs, a smaller gas tank, raised handlebars, and exhaust pipes which turned upwards at the rear. Such modifications became the standard for bob-jobs, which grew in popularity, whether as show bikes or ordinary road bikes. The bob-job evolved through the 1950s and 60s in several directions; some were strictly for the popular motorcycle and hot rod show circuit, some had a distinctive 'club bike' style, some reflected drag racing practice, and some were simply a continuation of the original Class C inspiration.

As home-built bikes - no commercially produced road-going bob-jobs were available until the late 1990s - bob-jobs reflected the aesthetic tastes of their owners. In turn, the style influenced motorcycle manufacturers, such as Harley-Davidson and Honda.

In the late 1990s, the term bob-job became shortened in popular parlance to 'bobber', and the style saw a resurgence in popularity in the custom motorcycle scene. The bobber continues to be favored today; although hybrid styles have emerged, such as the "bobber chopper", and "retro-bobber". Such bobbers exemplify the continuing evolution of the style, and its enduring popularity.

== Bobbers vs. choppers ==
The term 'chopper' did not appear in print until the mid-1960s, over 30 years after the first bob-jobs. The chopper is a more stylistically and technically extreme evolution of the bob-job, which emerged after the highly elaborate, heavily chromed bob-jobs which appeared in the late 1940s and 1950s. Bobbers are typically built around unmodified frames, while choppers use either highly modified or custom-made frames. Chopper frames are often cut and welded into shape. A bobber is a motorcycle that has undergone a ‘bob-job’, stripping it of extraneous parts for simplicity and weight-reduction.

Choppers, on the other hand, are more about overall style than performance, and often sport features that actually decrease the safety, handling, and braking ability of the machine. The driving force of a traditional bobber's style is the original form of the bike. Some parts could be swapped, such as turning around a stock Harley FL front fender and running it on the rear of the motorcycle, but in general stock parts were modified (trimming a fender shorter) or removed.

Instead of the large diameter front wheels of choppers, bobbers usually come with a size similar to the rear rim. Builders mostly use spring saddles, which isn't a must on choppers with their long extended sissy-bars. Springer forks are popular on both bikes, but often mounted with a higher rake in the chopper's triple-tree, to move the front wheel forward. Instead of glossy flake-paintings and chrome parts used for many choppers, a bobber more often comes as a ratbike in flat paint and/or some rusty parts, though this is more of a modern trend as motorcycles are built to resemble vintage motorcycles that had received a 'bob-job'.

== See also ==
- Bobber (disambiguation)
- Café racer – Genre of sporting motorcycle
- Cutdown – Customised scooter
- Outline of motorcycles and motorcycling – Overview of and topical guide to motorcycles and motorcycling
- Streetfighter – Type of sports motorcycle
- Triumph Bonneville Bobber
