= Don Ed Hardy =

American tattoo artist (born 1945)

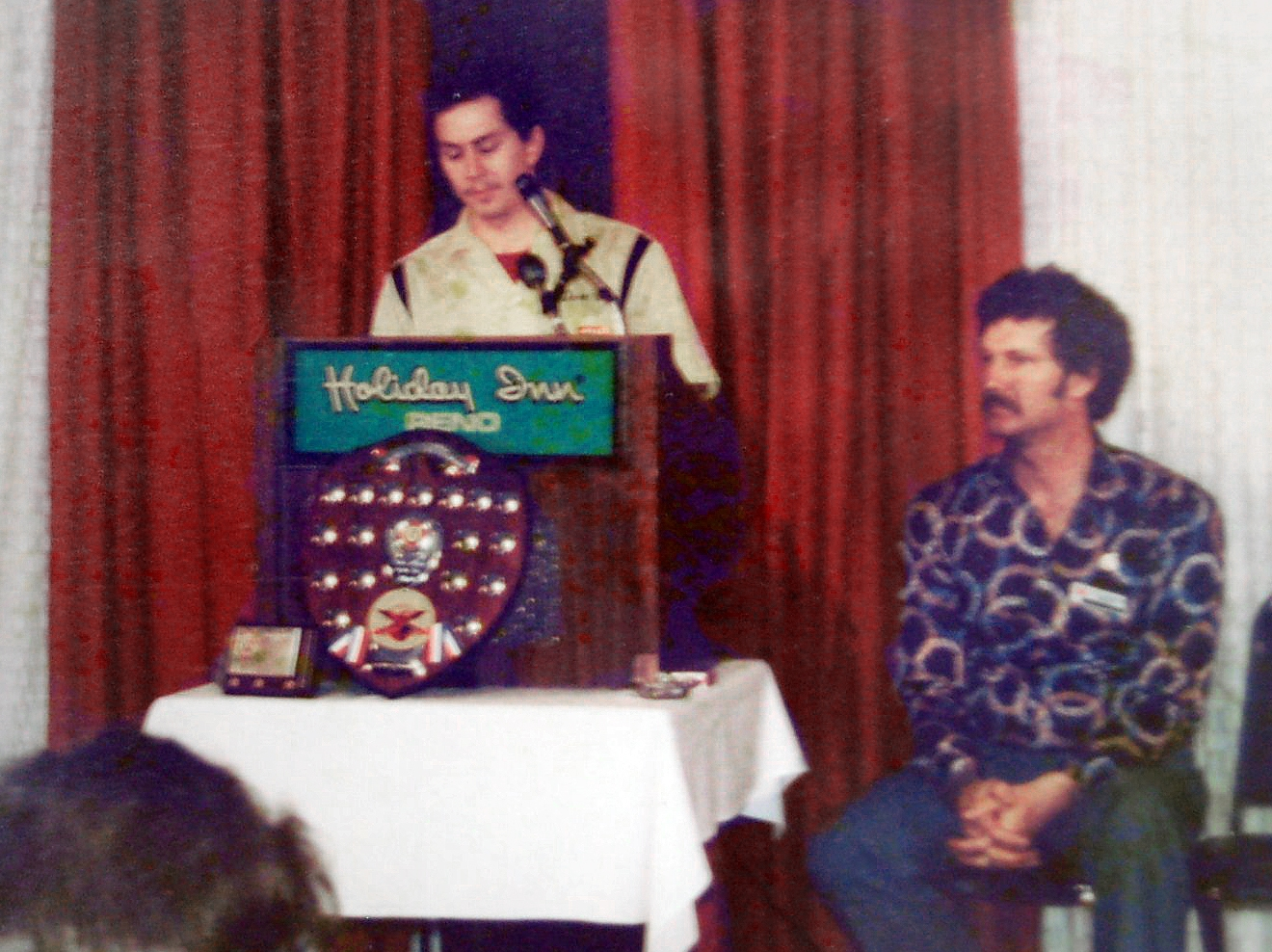
- Don Ed Hardy speaking at the second World Tattoo Convention in Reno, Nevada, 1977
- Born: January 1945 (age 81); Des Moines, Iowa, U.S.
- Known for: Painting, drawing, tattoo
- Movement: Body art, postmodern art

Don Ed Hardy (born 1945) is an American tattoo artist known for his tattoos, strong influence on the development of modern tattoo styles, and his eponymous brand.

== Early life ==
Hardy was born on January 5, 1945, in Des Moines, Iowa. He grew up in Corona del Mar, in Newport Beach, California. As a preteen a young Ed Hardy was interested in tattoos: one of his friends' fathers had Army tattoos, and it intrigued him so much that he took pens and colored pencils to draw on other neighborhood kids. During his years at Corona del Mar High School, Hardy was mentored by art teacher Shirley Rice, who introduced him to the works of Pablo Picasso and encouraged him to explore art beyond the popular "surf art" of the era. He spent time observing tattoo artists, including Bert Grimm, on the Pike in Long Beach. Hardy also credits his mother, who supported his work and encouraged him to follow his passions.

Hardy had his first art exhibit at the Laguna Beach Art Festival after graduating from high school. He attended the San Francisco Art Institute and graduated with a Bachelor of Fine Arts in printmaking. While there, Hardy learned drawing from Joan Brown, etching from Gordon Cook, and sculpting from Manuel Neri. He was later offered a full scholarship and graduate position for a Master of Fine Arts program at Yale. He declined and instead pursued his interest in tattoos.

== Career ==
Hardy was mentored by several famous and prolific tattoo artists, including Samuel Steward (also known by his nickname “Professor” Phil Sparrow), a former college professor. As a child, Hardy had copied Steward's designs. Steward showed Hardy a book of Japanese tattoos. Hardy, who had already been interested in Japanese history, culture and woodblock prints, had an epiphany; he described it as being struck by "lightning".

After Hardy finished his apprenticeship with Steward, he studied with the tattoo artists Zeke Owen in Seattle and Doc Webb in San Diego.

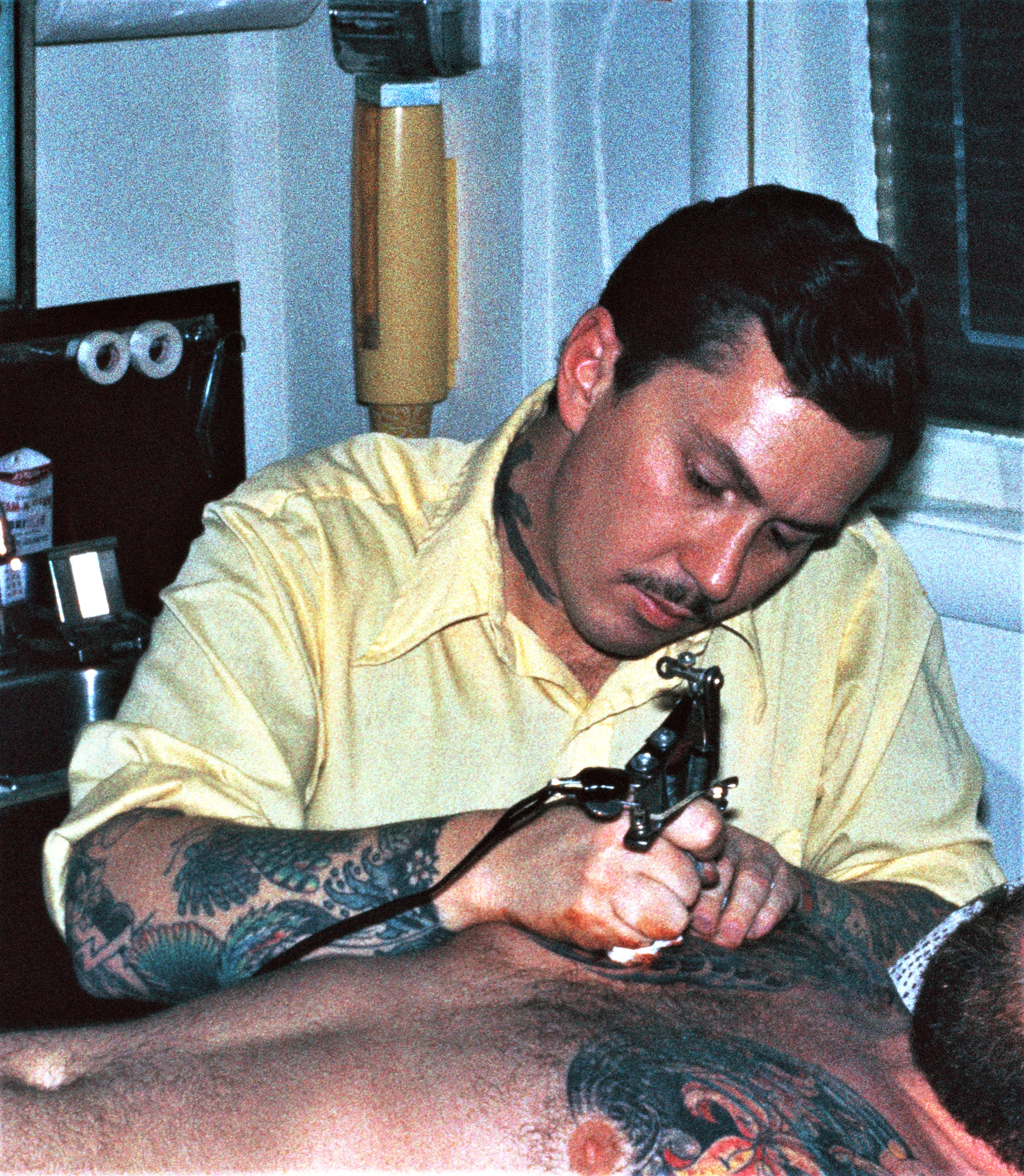
At a tattoo convention in 1980

Eventually Hardy formed a relationship with one of the pioneers of modern tattoo culture, Sailor Jerry Collins, who had a major impact on Hardy's work. He met with and began a long correspondence with Sailor Jerry, which paved the way for an introduction into a world previously closed off to outsiders. Through Jerry’s connections, Hardy began an association, in 1973, with the classical tattoo master Horihide. Hardy studied and tattooed in Japan off and on through the '70s and '80s. According to Hardy, his clientele at the time included Yakuza members. Hardy soon became recognized for being the main influence and driver in incorporating Japanese tattoo aesthetics and techniques into American styles of work.

=== Influence ===
One of the defining characteristics of Hardy's work is the elevation of tattoos from flash, predesigned tattoos, to customized and personalized work. Before this, it was very common for individuals, often those in the U.S. Navy, to walk into studios and select artwork off of a wall. Hardy’s motivations were to focus on one's self-expression, the resulting tattoos reflecting the individual's taste and preferences. This would be collaborative, done in consultation between tattoo artists and client. For Hardy, this was about customization and personalization, thus the wearer would have an emotional connection. This fine art mentality helped elevate tattoos from a subculture to pop culture, taking it from fringe culture to main culture.

=== Publications and conventions ===
In 1982, Hardy and his wife Francesca Passalacqua formed Hardy Marks Publications. Under this marque, they began publishing the five-book series Tattootime. Hardy Marks has published more than 25 books about alternative art, including catalogs of Rosie Camanga, Sailor Jerry Collins and his own work. EEE Productions (Ed Hardy, Ed Nolte, and Ernie Carafa) put together an influential tattoo convention on the Queen Mary in 1982, as well as organizing many other tattoo conventions and expos.

In 2000, he was appointed by Oakland Mayor Jerry Brown to the city's Cultural Arts Commission.

=== Paintings ===
In the year 2000, he painted a 500-foot artwork, "2000 Dragons", which includes dragons inspired by Asian art, Mesoamerican art, and tattoo designs. It was exhibited at the Cuenca Biennial in Ecuador in 2001 and at the Yerba Buena Center for the Arts in 2002. It was exhibited at Grace Cathedral, San Francisco in 2024. After completing 2000 Dragons, he worked on more paintings, including work inspired by Chinese classical art.

=== Retirement ===
By 2009, Hardy had retired from tattooing. He published a memoir in 2013, Wear Your Dreams: My Life in Tattoos. Hardy's work was exhibited in a retrospective show at the De Young Museum in San Francisco in 2019, "Ed Hardy: Deeper Than Skin", including paintings, prints, and drawings.

He owned Tattoo City, a studio in San Francisco. In August 2024, Tattoo City announced plans to close by the end of 2024 and said that Hardy has Alzheimer’s disease.

== Brand ==
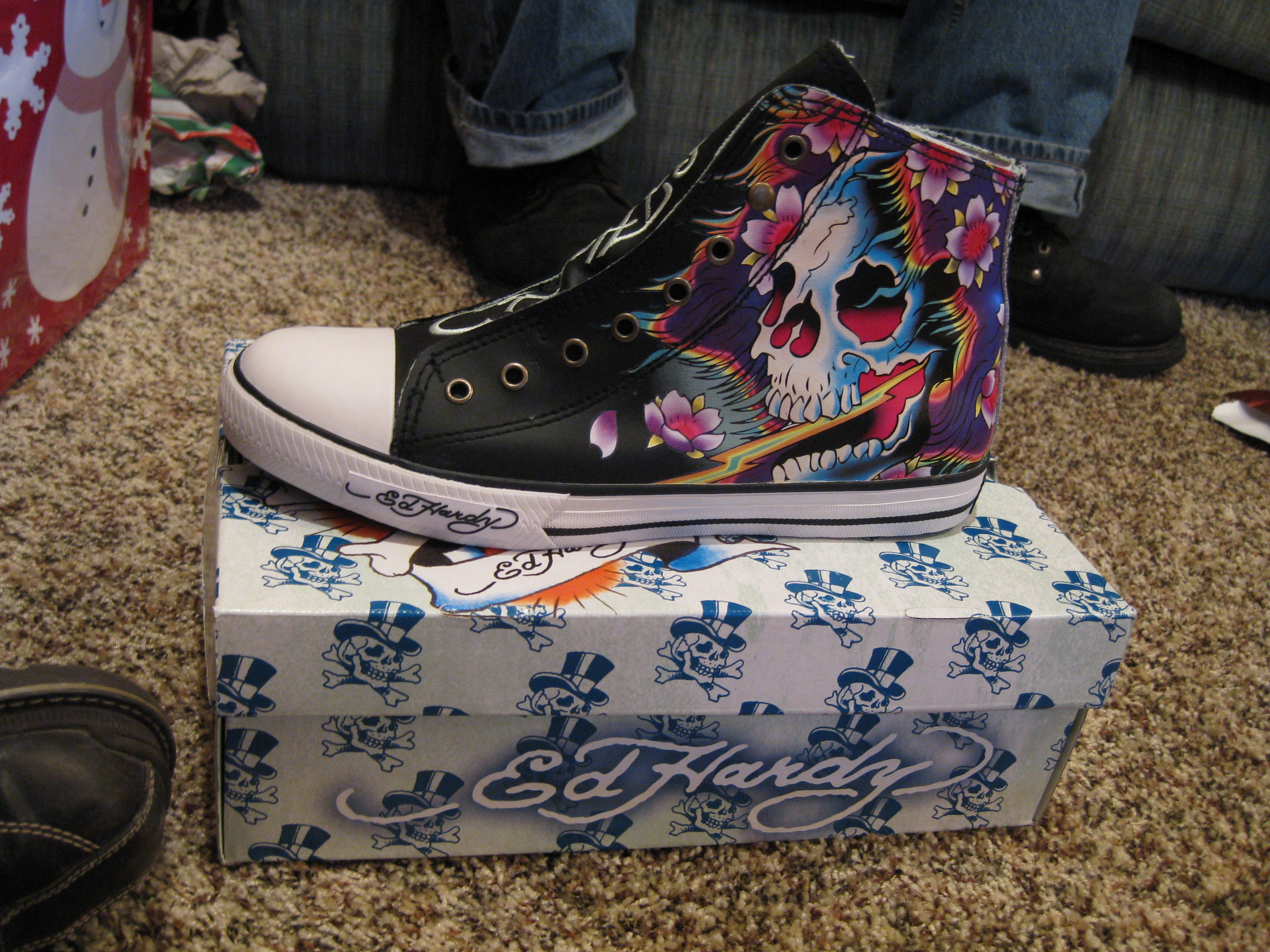
2008 Ed Hardy brand shoe

In the early 2000s, Hardy licensed Ku USA, Inc. to produce a clothing line based on his artwork. Hardy and Ku USA formed Hardy Life, now Hardy Way LLC, which owns the Ed Hardy brand and trademarks. The brand has subsequently been extensively licensed, at one point having 70 sublicensees, selling clothing, accessories, lighters, perfume, hair styling tools, and condoms.

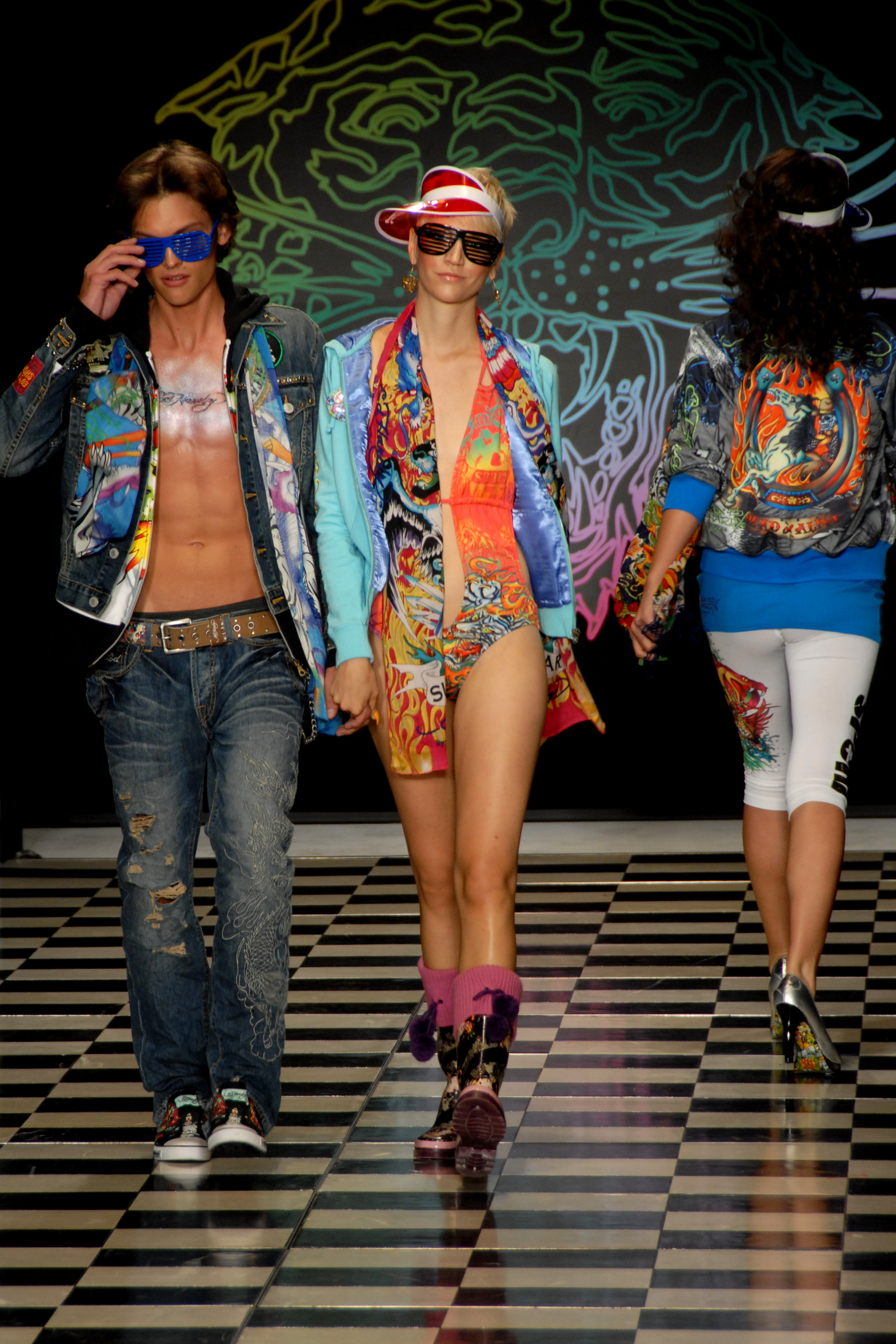
Models on the runway for Ed Hardy Fashion show during Los Angeles Fashion Week in 2008

The most famous licensee was Christian Audigier, previously of Von Dutch Originals, which marketed the imagery of Kenny Howard (aka Von Dutch), another noted American subculture artist. Audigier licensed the worldwide rights to the Ed Hardy brand in 2005 through his holding company, Nervous Tattoo, and employed the marketing techniques employed by Von Dutch Originals, marketing directly to celebrity clients and by opening stores in high-profile fashion districts.

The face of the brand (from 2008) was Sarah Larson. The brand gained significant popularity under Audigier, peaking at more than $700 million in gross revenue in 2009, but collapsed quickly in the following two years, leading to the closure of many stores. Among others, the Australian sublicensee of Ed Hardy (owned and operated by Gary Berman) entered administration and closed in 2010.

Hardy blamed the collapse on creative and marketing decisions by Audigier, such as Audigier featuring his own name prominently on branded items (on one item 14 times, compared to Hardy's once), and prominent association with short-lived reality TV celebrity Jon Gosselin. Following legal battles, Hardy regained control of the brand in 2010, though as part of the settlement Nervous remained a licensee for T-shirts, hats, and hoodies.

In May 2009, Iconix Brand Group announced it had acquired a 50 percent interest in Hardy Way, LLC, the owner of the Ed Hardy brand and trademarks, which it increased to 85% in 2011. Hardy retains a 15% minority stake.

In 2018, the brand successfully relaunched in Europe, and collaborations were presented with Missguided and Illustrated People amongst other brands, the latter sold via Selfridges, Asos and Topshop. In 2019, the brand carried out a further global collaboration with Rose In Good Faith.

== Works ==
- Bull's Eyes & Black Eyes, Hardy Marks Publications 2003.
- The Elephants' Graveyard, Frederick Spratt Gallery 2002.
- Smart art press - by Don Ed Hardy, Smart Art Press 2000.
- Tattooing the Invisible Man, Bodies of Work, Hardy Marks Publications/Smart Art Press 2000.
- Permanent Curios, Smart Art Press 1997.
- tattoo-time, ART FROM THE HEART, Hardy Marks Publications, Hawaii 1991.
- tattoo-time 4, LIVE AND DEATH TATTOS, Hardy Marks Publications, Hawaii 1988.
- tattoo-time 3, MUSIC & SEA TATTOOS, Hardy Marks Publications, Hawaii 1988.
- tattoo-time 2, TATTOO MAGIC, Hardy Marks Publications, Hawaii 1988.
- tattoo-time 1, NEW TRIBALISM, Hardy Marks Publications, Hawaii 1988.
