= Pinstripers =

Pinstripers may refer to:

- A person who applies pinstriping
- A person accoutred with pin stripes
