= Bobby Vaughn =

American surfer and co-founder of the Von Dutch clothing company

Robert "Bobby" Vaughn (born c. 1975) is an American surfer and co-founder of the Von Dutch clothing company. He was acquitted of first-degree murder of his friend Mark Rivas in February 2005 on the grounds of justifiable homicide.

== Early life ==
He grew up surfing in Santa Cruz, California, and later in Hawaii. He was involved in some manner in a fatal shooting at his high school.

== Von Dutch ==
Art collector Ed Boswell bought the rights to the Von Dutch name from Kenny Howard's daughters after Howard died in 1992. He met Mike Cassel, a former drug dealer turned clothing company entrepreneur. They and Vaughn, an associate of Cassel's, co-founded Von Dutch, at first hoping to start the next hot denim line. However, Boswell and Cassel did not get along, and Cassel ended up driving Boswell out of the business. Then Danish investor Tonny Sorensen was brought in to provide much-needed financing. Vaughn began feeling marginalized when Sorensen was made Chief Executive Officer and installed his own people in the sales and marketing departments. Sorensen eventually bought Vaughn's share of the company and fired him.

== Murder charge ==
In February 2005, Vaughn claimed that his friend Mark Rivas, recently released from prison, attacked him with a broken bottle. Vaughn shot and killed Rivas. He was charged with first-degree murder, but was acquitted by a jury.

== Later life ==
He was later sentenced to five years probation for carrying an unregistered gun.

In April 2009, Vaughn opened a high-end surf shop in Queens called FTW.

== Documentaries ==
He is the subject of the 2010 short documentary Facing the Waves. He is also one of the principal figures in the 2021 Hulu documentary series The Curse of Von Dutch: A Brand to Die For.
