= Christian Audigier =

French fashion designer (1958–2015)

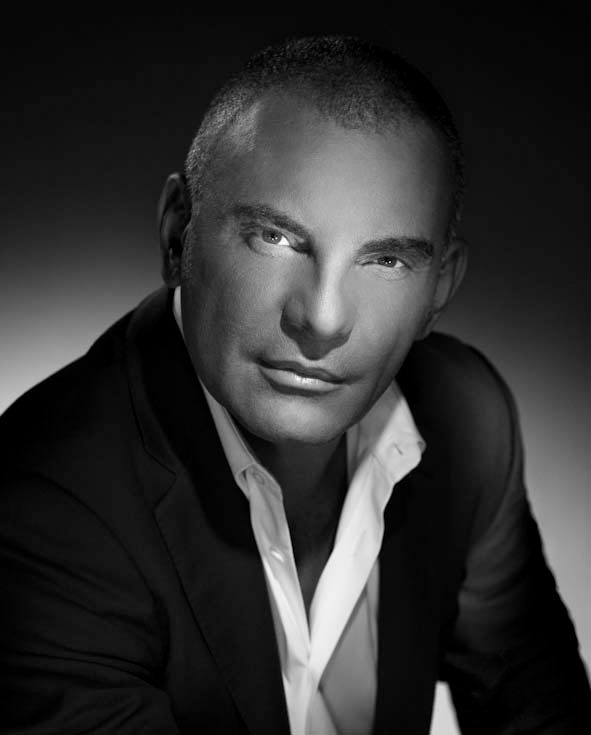
- Christian Audigier in 2009
- Born: Christian Audigier; 21 May 1958; Avignon, France
- Died: 9 July 2015 (aged 57); Los Angeles, California, U.S.
- Occupation: Fashion designer
- Labels: Ed Hardy; Von Dutch; Christian Audigier; Lord Baltimore; Lady Baltimore
- Website: https://christianaudigier-remember.com/

Christian Audigier (French: [odiʒje]; 21 May 1958 – 9 July 2015) was a French fashion designer known for the Ed Hardy and Von Dutch clothing lines.

== Early life ==
Christian Audigier was born on 21 May 1958 in Avignon, France.

== Career ==
Audigier began working in the fashion industry at the age of fifteen. He designed a line of denim that was inspired by his love for rock and roll, specifically The Rolling Stones. His designs became so popular that a top executive from MacKeen Jeans took notice of Audigier's talent, allowing him to create with the company and travel the world. He moved to New York in his early twenties to expand his own brand. He worked with Guess, Levi's, Diesel, Fiorucci, Bisou Bisou and XOXO, Smet, among others.

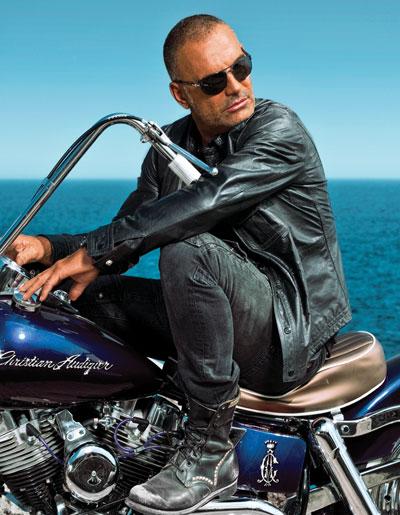
Audigier on a motorcycle in 2010

He then moved to Los Angeles where he would achieve most of his success as a fashion designer. After the death of artist Kenny Howard, also known as Von Dutch, in 1992, Howard's daughters sold the Von Dutch name to Ed Boswell who then began working together with Michael Cassel and Robert Vaughn to create the Von Dutch brand. Later, Tonny Sorensen would be brought in as an investor and would become a 51% owner of the company while Michael Cassel owned 49%. It was Tonny Sorensen who initially brought in Christian Audigier. The clothing brand that followed gained popularity in the US and attracted the attention of celebrities such as Madonna, Britney Spears, Justin Timberlake, and later Ashton Kutcher and Eric Church. Audigier helped popularize the brand, but left on amicable terms in 2007. He went on to popularize the Ed Hardy brand. Audigier's other brands include SMET with French singer Johnny Hallyday. Audigier's brands are sold internationally in over 40 countries.

In 2008, he joined forces with a small cooperative in France, Montpeyroux Estates, to release a line of fine wines. The bottles are wrapped with labels that are designed with the classic Ed Hardy designs and are done by art director and photographer Barry Sutton.

Audigier was a partner along with Pure Management in a nightclub in the Treasure Island Hotel and Casino in Las Vegas. The nightclub closed in September 2010.

He released a line of Ed Hardy perfumes for men and women. In 2012, he appeared on an episode of Sweden's Next Top Model.

In 2011 Christian Audigier sold Ed Hardy to Iconix Brand Management Group.

== Personal life ==
He had four children: Crystal, Dylan, Rocco and Vito. Audigier resided in the Mid-Wilshire section of Los Angeles.

== Death ==
Audigier was diagnosed with myelodysplastic syndrome, a blood cancer, in January 2015. He died on 10 July 2015 at Cedars-Sinai Hospital in Los Angeles, California, after lapsing into a coma.
