= Camel-hair brush =

Type of paintbrush made using soft natural hairs

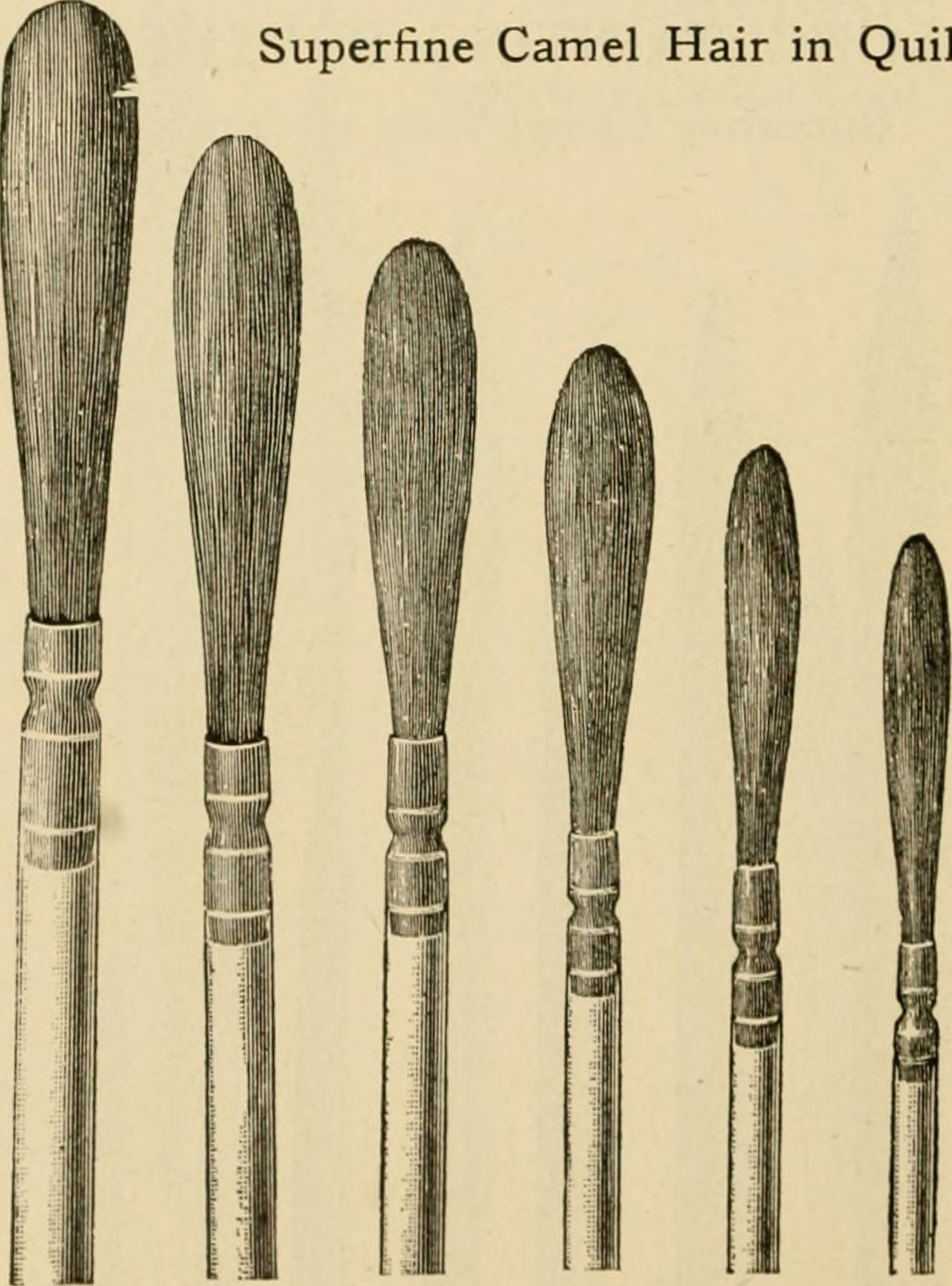
Camel-hair brushes in a 1914 art supplies catalogue

A camel-hair brush is a type of paintbrush with soft bristles made from natural hairs, usually squirrel. Actual camel hair is not a suitable material, although historically camel was used for ancient Chinese ink brushes (and for camel hair cloth). It is a widely used brush in art, but is considered inferior to the more expensive sable and ox-hair brushes. In some niche applications, such as pinstriping, camel hair is an ideal brush. Camel-hair brushes have numerous uses outside of art, particularly dusting where a soft brush is needed for delicate objects or skin.

== Construction and properties ==
The bristles of camel-hair brushes are traditionally made of squirrel hair and this is still the most common material. They can also be made from goat, ox or pony or a blend of any of these. They are never made from camel hair, either in whole or in part.

Camel-hair brushes are a soft brush. They are a considerably cheaper alternative to the expensive kolinsky sable-hair brush (a red sable), considered the best brush for watercolour painting. However, they are inferior in that they lack the springiness and natural point of red sable.

Cheaper camel-hair brushes, such as those supplied to schools, are usually mass-produced from pony hair cut from the mane. Pony is used because the long mane hairs can be cut up by machine to make many brushes simultaneously. However, the cut ends are not so good at coming to a point as the natural tips.

== History ==
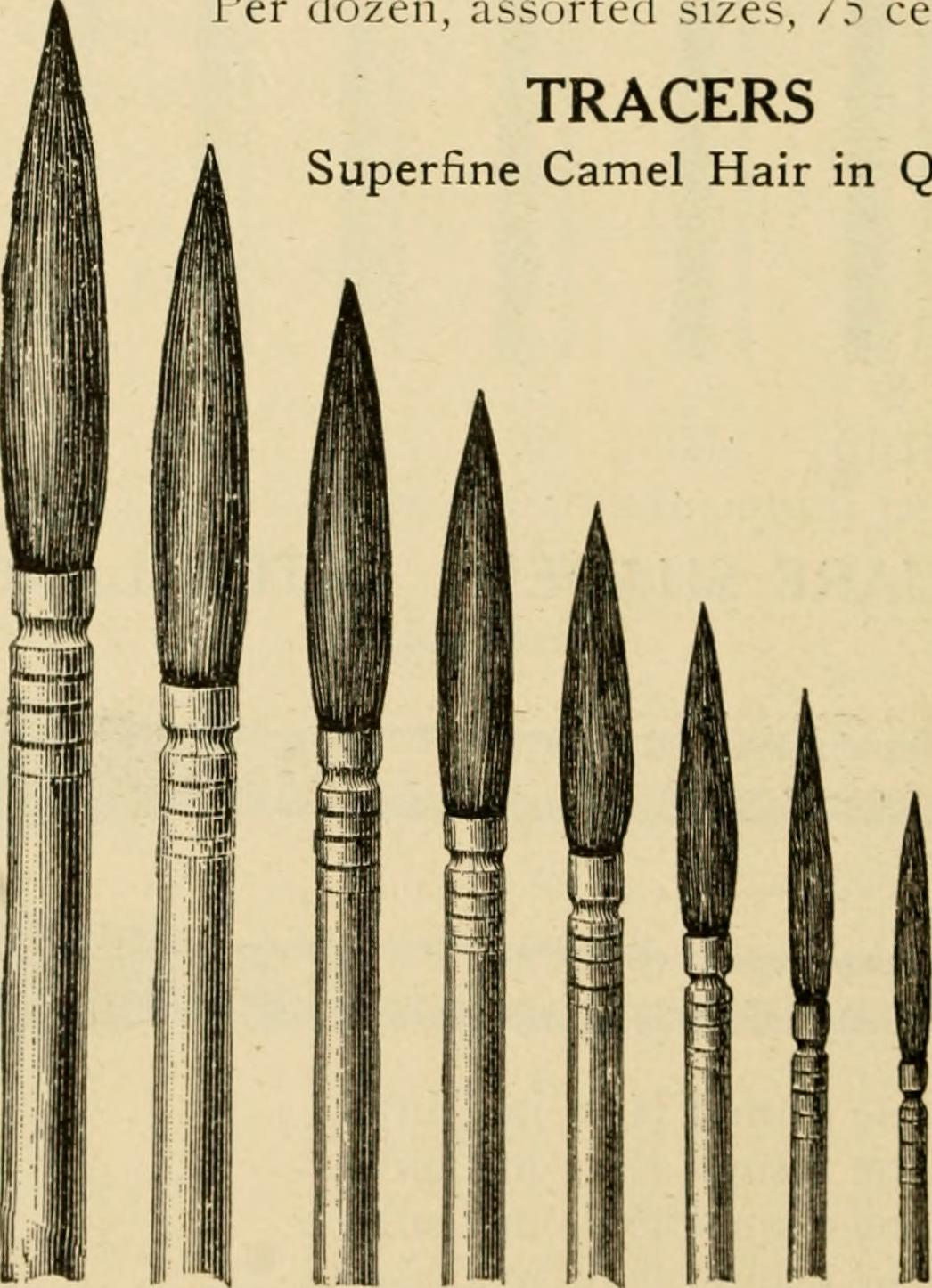
Camel-hair brushes with fine points for tracing, from a 1914 art supplies catalogue

There is an often repeated urban legend that camel-hair brushes are so named because they were invented by a "Mr. Camel". This is almost certainly not true. This person, or his company, has never been identified. The story is very old, at least as far back as 1922 when it was mentioned in Marvels of the Animal World. The alternative explanation that brushes were once actually made of camel hair is true, but these would be a very different brush and would not be considered a camel-hair brush in modern terminology. Camel hair is wooly, making it unsuitable for the uses to which camel-hair brushes are put.

In 250 BC, the Chinese general Meng Tian invented the ink brush. Meng Tian is perhaps better known for supervising the construction of the Great Wall of China. Meng Tian's brush consisted of actual camel hair, or sometimes rabbit hair, lashed to a wooden handle with twine. This brush was a great step forward in writing. Writing became much easier and the spread of calligraphy in China created the need for a cheaper and more plentiful medium to write on. This came in 105 AD with the invention of paper which in turn paved the way for the invention of printing.

== Applications ==
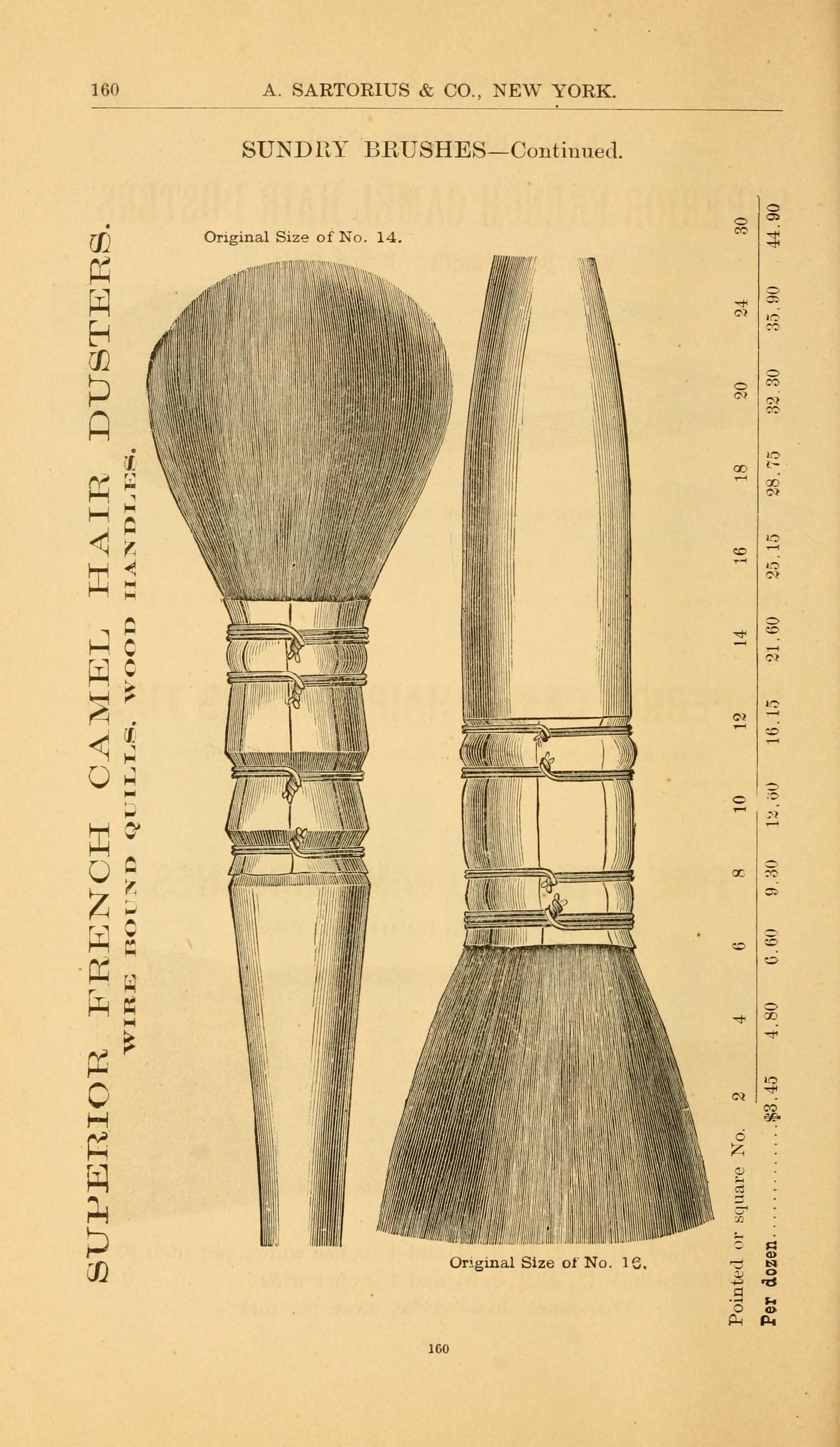
Camel-hair dusters from an 1894 art supplies catalogue

Camel-hair brushes are used in signwriting. Camel-hair brushes can be used for watercolour painting but are not the best choice. They are poor where good points are required and do not hold their shape well when in contact with water. They are, however, good as large flat brushes when broad areas are being painted. They also do not perform well with heavy paints, especially the formerly widely used white lead-based paints. The weight of the paint tends to make the brush collapse.

Pinstriping is the application of thin decorative lines to an object. This can range from simple coachlines down the side of motor cars, to elaborate decoration of furniture. Pinstriping brushes are traditionally camel-hair brushes. These are sometimes called striping pencils and are small brushes with very long bristles. The idea of the length is to hold a greater amount of paint so that very long lines can be painted in one stroke. Pinstripers originally made their own brushes (and sometimes still do) from the bristles of a larger camel-hair brush, but dedicated brushes are now available. One of the earliest such brushes was designed by Andrew Mack in 1891, a carriage striper for the J.J. Deal wagon and buggy company in Jonesville, Michigan. Mack was dissatisfied with the brushes supplied by the Deal company and made his own. These became so popular with other pinstripers around the country that he left Deal to set up his own company, the Mack Brush Company, which still makes highly regarded pinstriping brushes in Michigan.

Camel-hair brushes have many uses in woodworking, including applying finishes. Camel hair is less effective at working into corners or to a line because of the poorer point (or edge) on the tip.

The brushes barbers use to remove the loose hairs from the back of the customer's neck can be camel hair. They are also the preferred brushes for surgeons, dentists, and jewellers. Their soft bristles make them ideal for cleaning dust from delicate equipment or materials, such as film or stills cameras.
