= Tonny Sørensen =

Danish entrepreneur

Tonny Sorensen
- Born: March 9, 1964 (age 62); Copenhagen, Denmark
- Education: BEng, Electrical Engineering
- Alma mater: University of Copenhagen
- Occupations: Innovator, Creative Director, Social Entrepreneur, Chief Executive Officer
- Employer(s): Planet illogica and California Christiania Republic
- Known for: commercialization of the art and style of Kenny Von Dutch Howard; launched the Trucker Cap as a Pop culture meme
- Children: 1
- Website: http://www.planetillogica.com & http://www.ccrbrand.com

Tonny Sorensen (born March 9, 1964) is a Danish entrepreneur and creative director best known for his commercialization of the California clothing brand Von Dutch Originals. He is the chief executive officer and co-founder of Planet illogica, an online creative community for artists and art organizations. and California Christiania Republic clothing brand.

== Biography ==
Tonny Sorensen was born on March 9, 1964, in Copenhagen, Denmark. He earned a Bachelor of Engineering degree in Electronic Engineering from the University of Copenhagen, and a degree in Business and Trade from a Copenhagen trade school. Sorensen was a member of Denmark's Taekwondo team at the 1988 Summer Olympics in Seoul, and won a Gold Medal in the Heavyweight division of the 1991 World Taekwondo Championships in Athens, Greece. Sorensen subsequently owned the Gladsaxe dojo in Denmark, an elite school that produced several Taekwondo world champions.

Sorensen moved to the United States in 1991, settling in Los Angeles, where he studied acting, screenwriting and filmmaking. In 1998 he co-produced the 1998 movie American Intellectuals, starring Portia de Rossi.

Sorensen's style of management earned him a reputation as a rebel in the world of fashion. His "one-second rule," in which he instantly decides on whether or not to pursue a new project, design or program, led to the Trucker Cap.

== Kustom Kulture and Von Dutch Originals ==
The Trucker Cap, popularized by Von Dutch Originals under the leadership of Tonny Sorensen

In the mid-1990s, Sorensen purchased a hot rod Cadillac and became involved in Southern California car culture. Sorensen's Venice mechanic introduced him to the art and design of Kenny "Von Dutch" Howard, a father of the Kustom Kulture movement that heavily influenced the fashion and style of hot rodding, surf culture, skateboarding and rock 'n' roll. Intrigued by Howard, Sorensen set-out to make a film about Von Dutch's life, which led him to Michael Cassel, who had earlier acquired the rights to reproduce the iconic "Von Dutch" signature and imagery from Howard's heirs and had established Von Dutch Originals.

Sorensen invested in Von Dutch Originals in 2000 and became its CEO, opening the Melrose Avenue retail location that same year. Sorensen expanded Von Dutch from a niche T-shirt and hat line to a full-scale fashion collection adding hoodies, jeans and accessories. Sorensen grew the business, opening stores in Las Vegas, Santa Monica, Beverly Hills, Chicago and Miami, with wholesale distribution to Japan, Canada and Europe. Von Dutch Originals used high-level product placements and celebrity involvement to propel the brand. In the height of the brand's popularity, Britney Spears, Justin Timberlake, and Ashton Kutcher were photographed wearing the Von Dutch trucker hat. Sales reached $33 million in 2003, and as high as $100 million in 2004. Von Dutch Originals was sold to Groupe Royer S.A. in 2009.

== Planet illogica ==
Influenced by the free and open trade mentality of Freetown Christiania, an artist enclave near Copenhagen, and his success as a brand entrepreneur at Von Dutch, Sorensen was inspired to build an online artistic community. In 2007 he partnered with Ken Goldstein, founder of marketing agency Six Shooter LA, and formerly Marketing Director of Von Dutch, to form Planet illogica, an online collaborative tool for artists. The site launched in July 2009 with the help of the American Film Institute's Digital Content Lab.

The site and organization are designed to serve as a tool to help artists create, promote and sell their work, and build collaborative relationships with other artists and commercial brands. Planet illogica's business model relies on product sales and licensing of user-generated content, Borrowing on Sorensen's earlier experience with Von Dutch, Planet illogica focuses on the commercial intersection between emblematic art and brand associations with that art, deliberately fostering relationships between art, brand imagery and commercial advertising.

Planet illogica also serves as a vehicle for Sorensen to scout and develop talent. Select artists are supported by the organization's artist in residence program, which provides marketing, management, legal and financial support for the artist, and which facilitates joint artistic ventures with Planet illogica's alliance partners. Planet illogica's affiliate network includes Nike, Sony PlayStation, Best Buy and Guitar Center, among others.

Examples of Planet illogica's marketing support of its artists in residence include their 2010 South by Southwest art exhibit of American contemporary artist Ron English's Historic KISS art and other music-related prints, and its online sale and promotion of custom limited edition apparel from English's Popaganda collection. Planet illogica continues Sorensen's promotion of fashion lines, with its launch of artist Civil Smith's American Heritage apparel collection, the California Christiania Republic line and Sorensen's own Tonny Sorensen Collection.

== California Christiania Republic ==
In 2010, Sorensen launched his new clothing brand, California Christiania Republic, or CCR, with a one-piece casual suit called the one*Z. The clothing item, which is adorned with the "Freedom Star" of CCR, was clearly featured in several popular music videos, including Willow Smith's debut music video, "Whip My Hair"

The name of the clothing line is a reference and homage to Freetown Christiania and part of Sorensen's effort to save the town, from being taken over by the current Danish government.

== Other social ventures ==
Sorensen has also engaged Planet illogica and his Tonny Sorensen Foundation to support other social ventures, including Manifest Equality, an art and music event used as vehicle to raise awareness of LGBT civil rights, the Starts With U Global Sustainability Symposium’s work regarding social inclusion of minority groups, Climate Refugees, a documentary about climate change, and the Save Our Oceans Tour, which is a series of music, film and art installations,

== Collections ==
Sorensen's auto collection features the most valuable motorcycle in the world, Steve McQueen's Von Dutch 1929 Scott 596cc Super Squirrel, a rare Ray Allen world champion 1970 Chevelle, and a 1969 Mercury Cyclone Boss 429 NASCAR (winner of the 1969 NASCAR circuit).

Tonny Sorensen's Von Dutch-restored 1929 Super Squirrel.

His art collection includes works from lowbrow and pop-surrealism artists Basquiat, Ron English, Shepard Fairey, Kenny "Von Dutch" Howard and Ed "Big Daddy" Roth.
