= Triumph Bonneville Bobber =

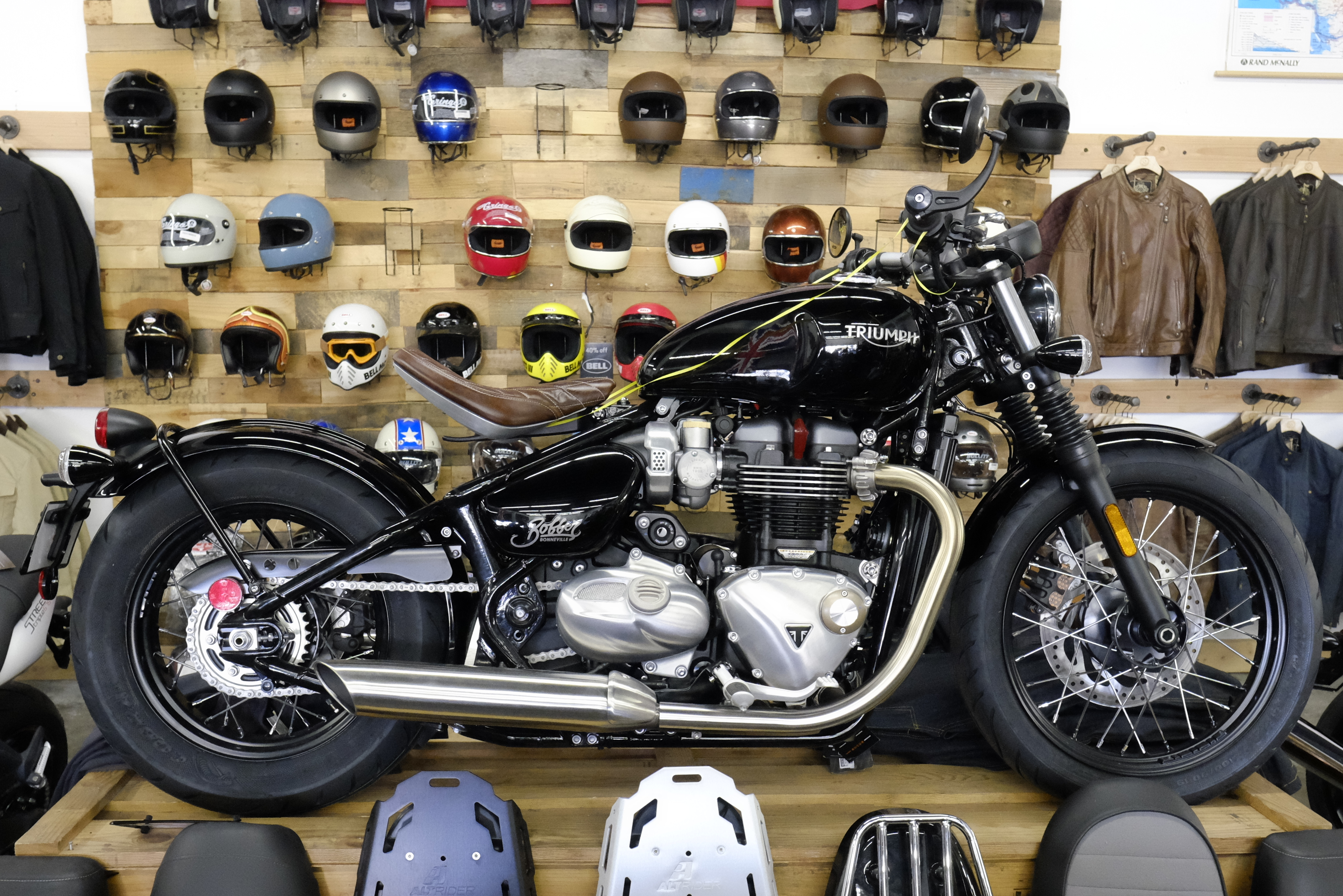
- Manufacturer: Triumph Motorcycles Ltd
- Production: 2016-present (1200 cc)
- Class: Cruiser
- Engine: 1,200 cc (73 cu in) liquid-cooled, SOHC, 270° crank angle parallel-twin
- Bore / stroke: 97.6 mm × 80.0 mm (3.84 in × 3.15 in)
- Power: 77 bhp (57 kW)@ 6,100 rpm
- Torque: 78.2 lb⋅ft (106.0 N⋅m)@ 4,000 rpm(rear wheel)
- Transmission: 6-speed gearbox with chain final drive
- Rake, trail: 25.8°
- Wheelbase: 1,510 mm (59.4 in)
- Dimensions: W: 800 mm (31 in); H: 1,024 mm (40.3 in) w/o mirrors
- Seat height: 690 mm (27 in)
- Related: Triumph Bonneville

The Triumph Bonneville Bobber is a bobber-style cruiser motorcycle based on the Bonneville series from Triumph Motorcycles Ltd. It was announced late 2016 and began selling in February 2017.

The Bobber's differences from the Bonneville T120 include:

- An adjustable solo seat that can slide backward or forward and by this tilted higher or lower
- A swing cage mounted to a mono shock absorber which is mostly hidden from the profile view with the illusion that the frame has a hard tail
- The 1200cc engine is detuned for less horsepower in favour of higher torque at a lower engine rpm
- Single front disc brake
- Slash cut style exhaust pipes instead of the traditional pea-shooter style

In 2020, Triumph introduced a limited edition Triumph Factory Custom (TFC) version of the Bobber. Globally, only 750 of these bikes were produced and each is numbered in the series.

The Bobber TFC features:

- Union Jack treatment on the fuel tank
- Statement seat
- Brushed stainless steel 2 into 2 single-skin exhaust system with Arrow brushed stainless silencers and carbon end caps
- Ohlins front and rear suspension
- Increased HP: 87 PS @ 6,250rpm
- Increased torque: 110 Nm @ 4,500rpm

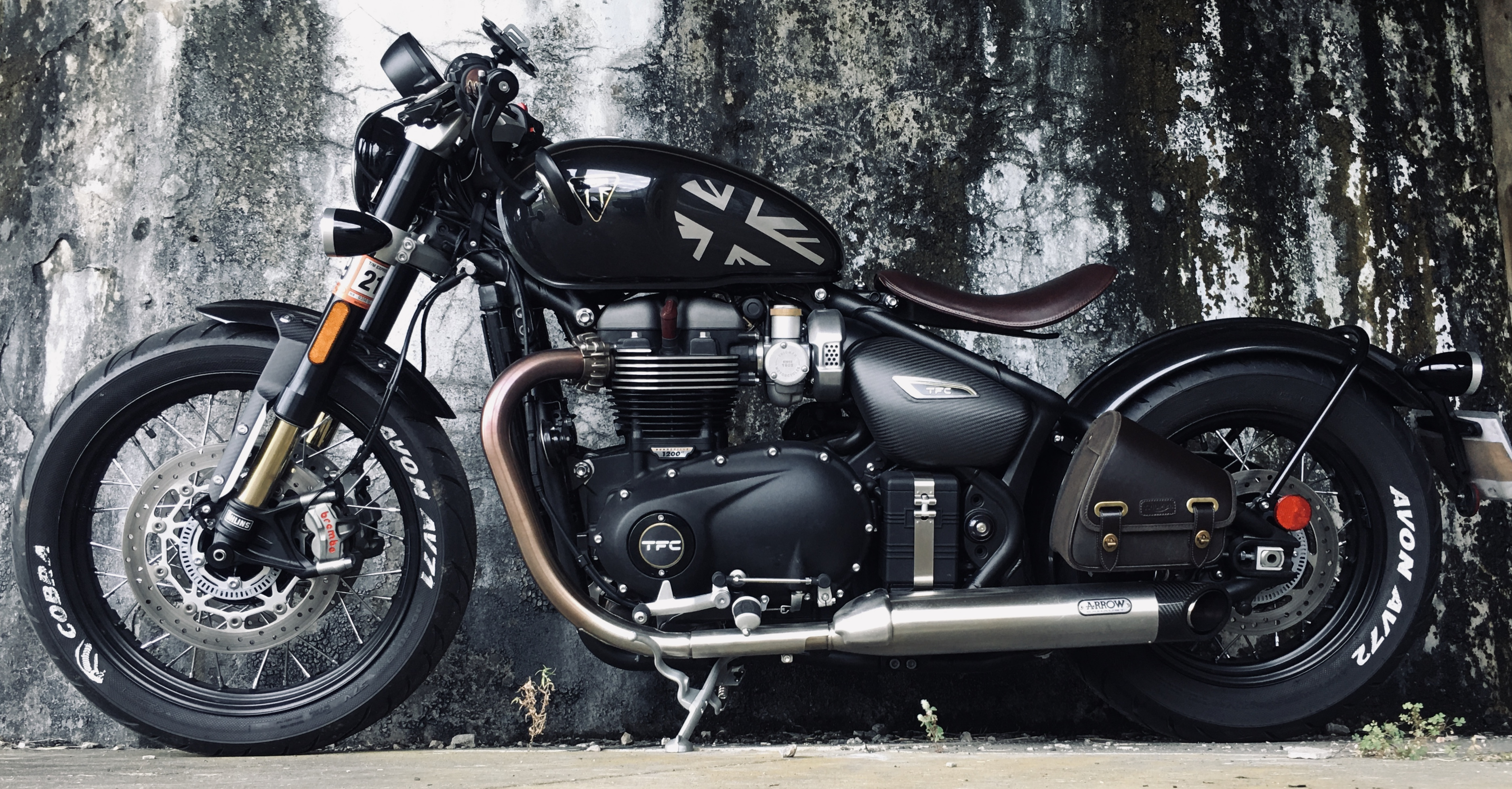
2020 Triumph Bobber TFC (#359 of 750)

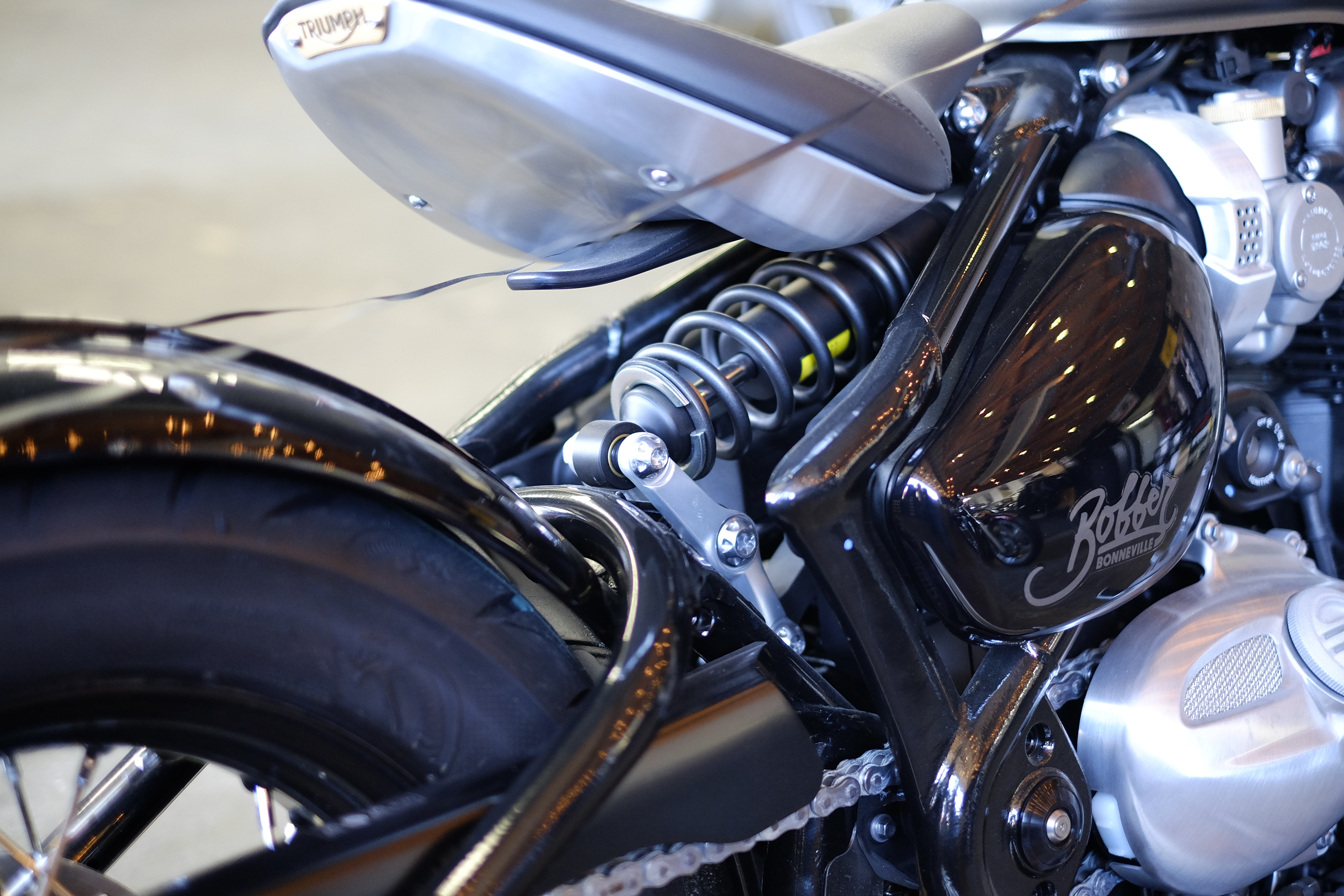
Rear shock is somewhat concealed, for the hard tail look

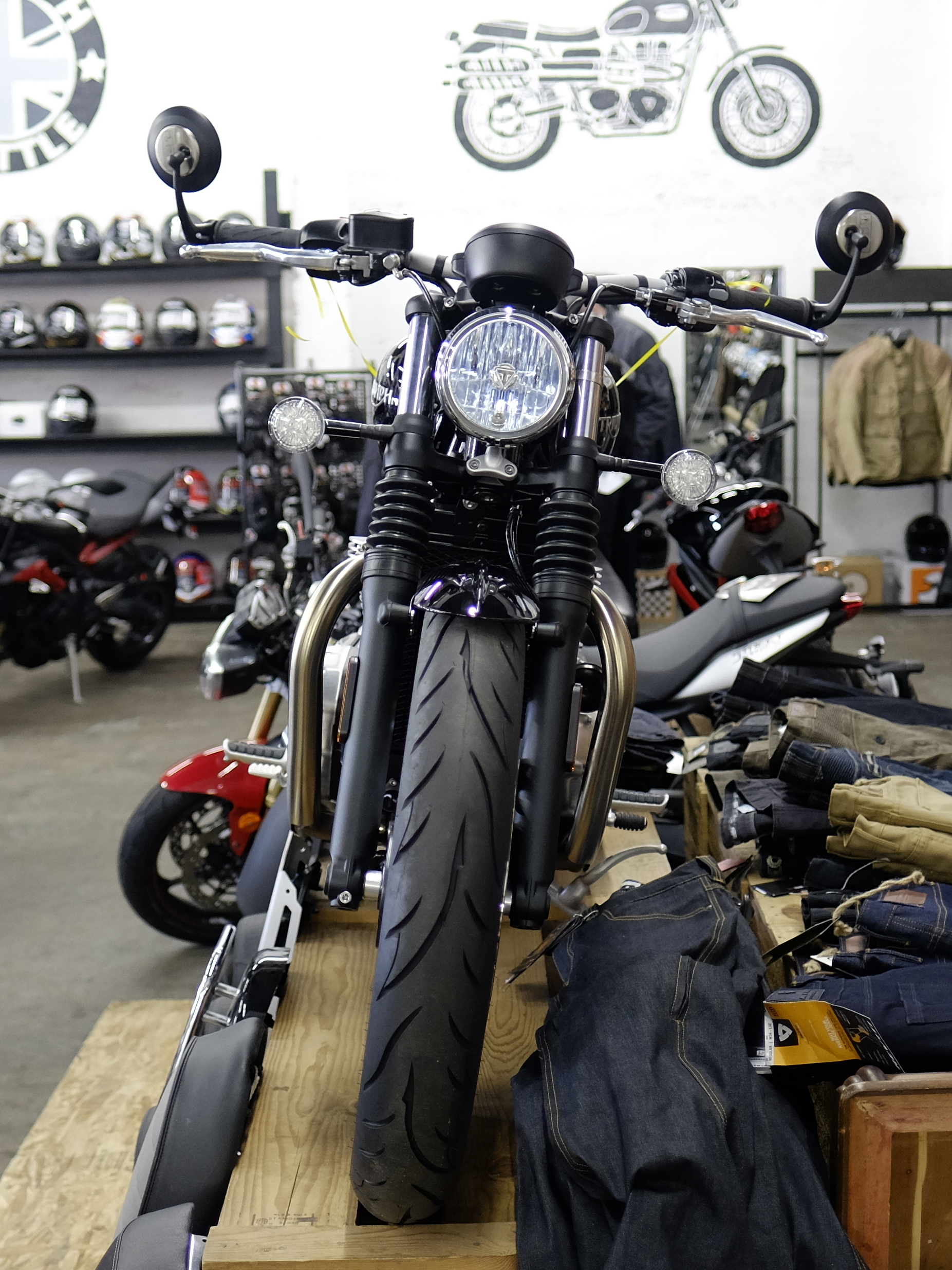
2017 Bonneville Bobber

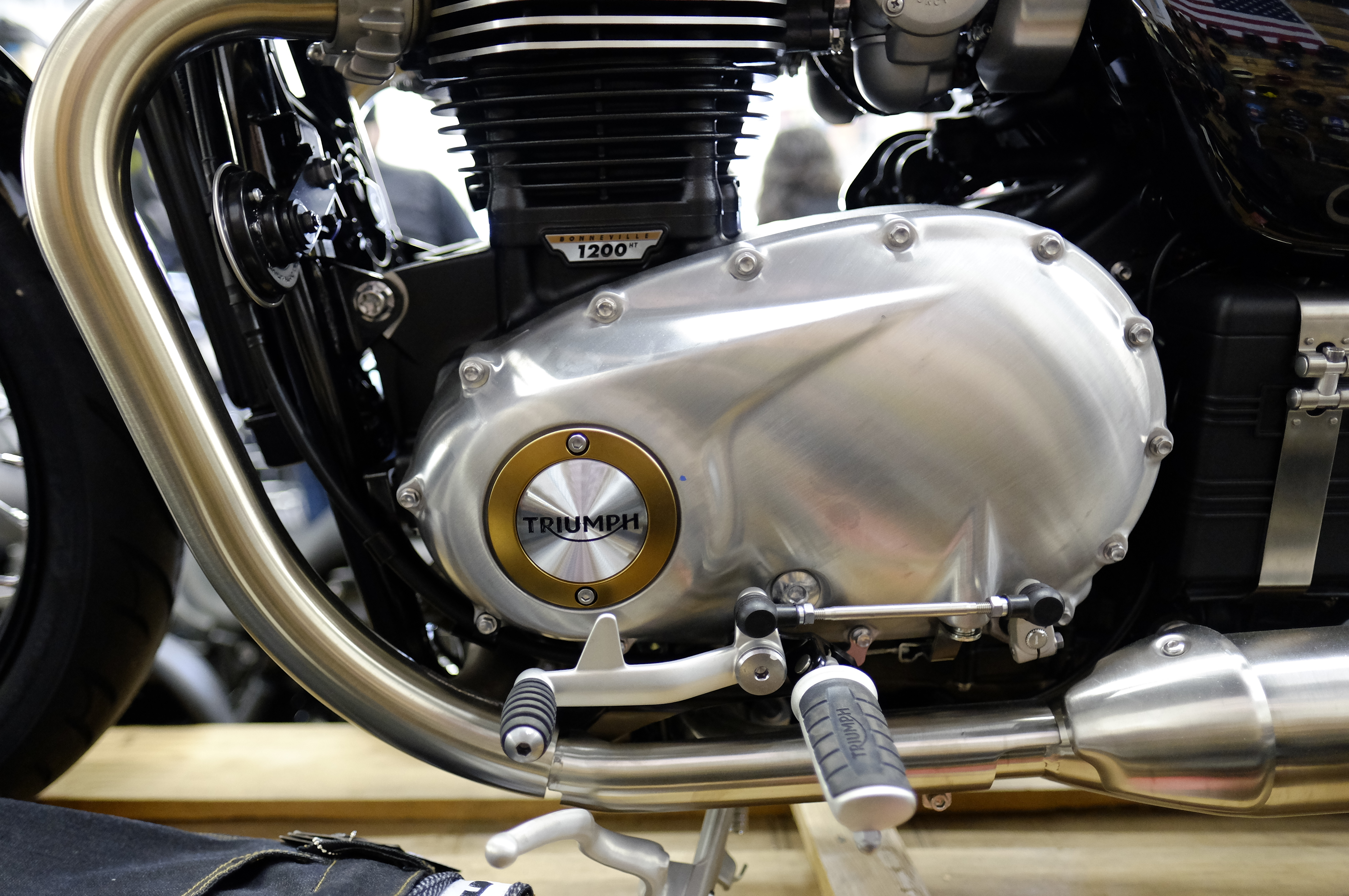
Engine case
