= Bobber =

Bobber may refer to:

- Bobber (fishing), a small float used in angling to suspend the lure at a predetermined depth
- Bobber (motorcycle), a motorcycle with many standard parts removed to reduce weight or to present a "clean" or minimalist aesthetic
- Bobber Caboose, rail road car with four wheels (two axle) rather than the standard eight
