= Horihide =

Japanese tattoo artist

- Born: Kakimoto Hideo; 1 January 1929; Tsurumaki, Setagaya-ku, Tokyo, Japan
- Died: 18 April 2017 (aged 88)
- Occupation: Tattoo artist
- Known for: Horimono tattoo

Kakimoto Hideo, also known as Horihide (1 January 1929 – 18 April 2017) was a Japanese tattoo artist.

American tattoo artist Ed Hardy worked alongside Horihide's apprentice, Kazuo Oguri (also called Horihide) in 1973.

== See also ==
- Horimono
