= Pinstriping brush =

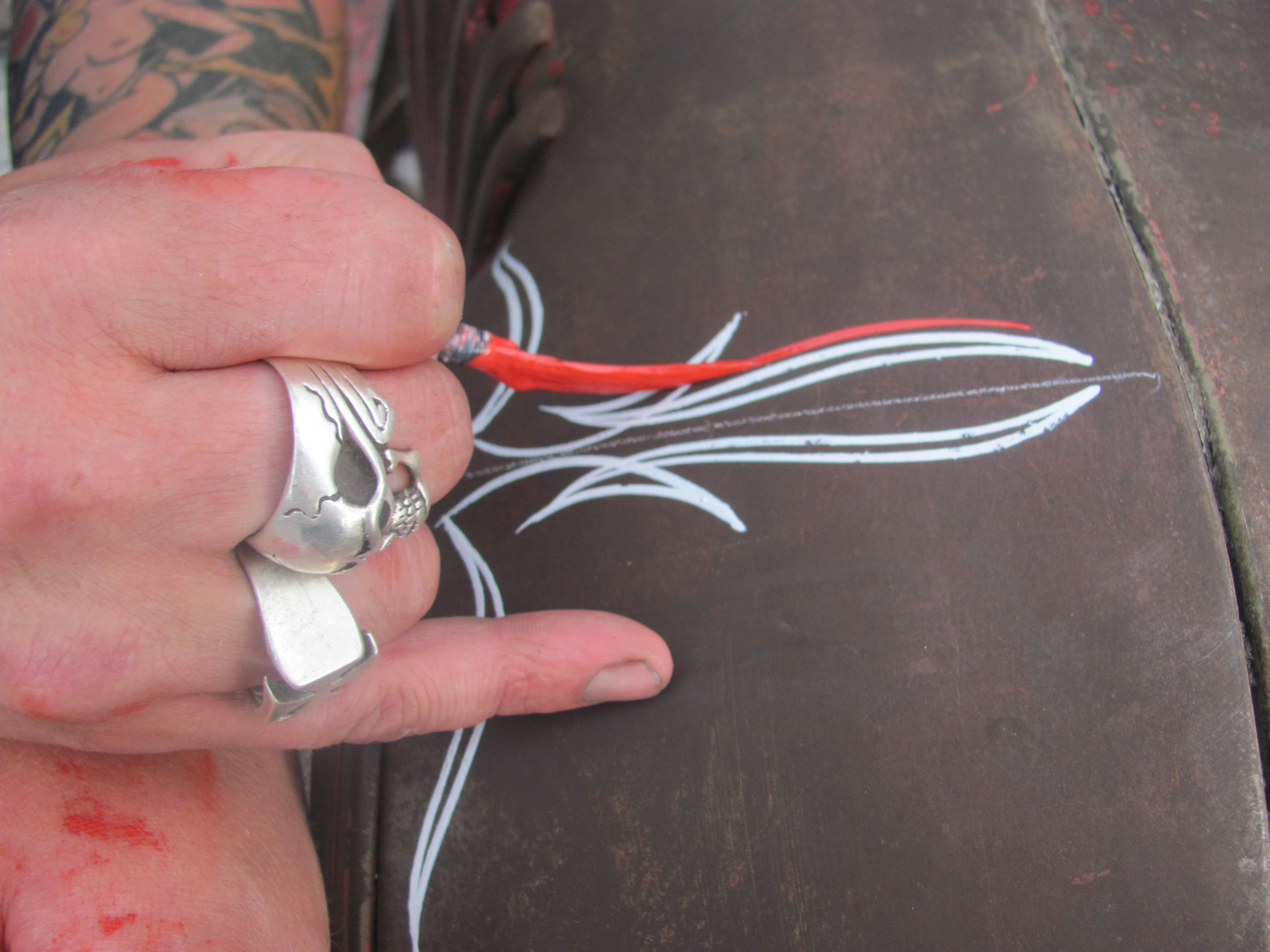
An artist using a pinstriping brush on a car

A pinstriping brush is the tool of traditional free hand pin stripers use for pin striping. Freehand pin striping is the most difficult method of pin striping and the brush is an important tool for design. Pinstriping brushes have several different designs: Swords, Daggers, and Flats, as well as Double line brushes. The brush consists of a small wood dowel handle, string or brass fixture with adhesive and brush hairs traditionally made from squirrel hair (confusingly called camel hair). The small wood dowel is balanced so pin stripers can freely spin the brush between their fingers. The dowel's short length is so the brush does not hit the palm of the hand while the brush is placed in-between the index finger and thumb. The hair of a pinstriping brush is relatively long at approximately 2 inches or more, compared to most artistic brushes of a similar size. This long length is to hold the necessary amount of paint to pull a long line.

== Cleaning and storage ==
After every use of a pinstriping brush, the brush must be cleaned in order to not damage the brush once the paint dries. The cleaning procedure consists of submerging the brush hairs in mineral spirits; the brush is then laid down and the brush hairs are gently worked through to remove all paint and residue.

The brush hair is delicate and must be stored properly between usage. The brush should be laid flat and soaked in brush oil.

== Sources ==
- The First Brazilian site dedicated to the Kustom Kulture / Pinstriping Old Skool
