= Tattoo convention =

Meeting for tattooists and enthusiasts

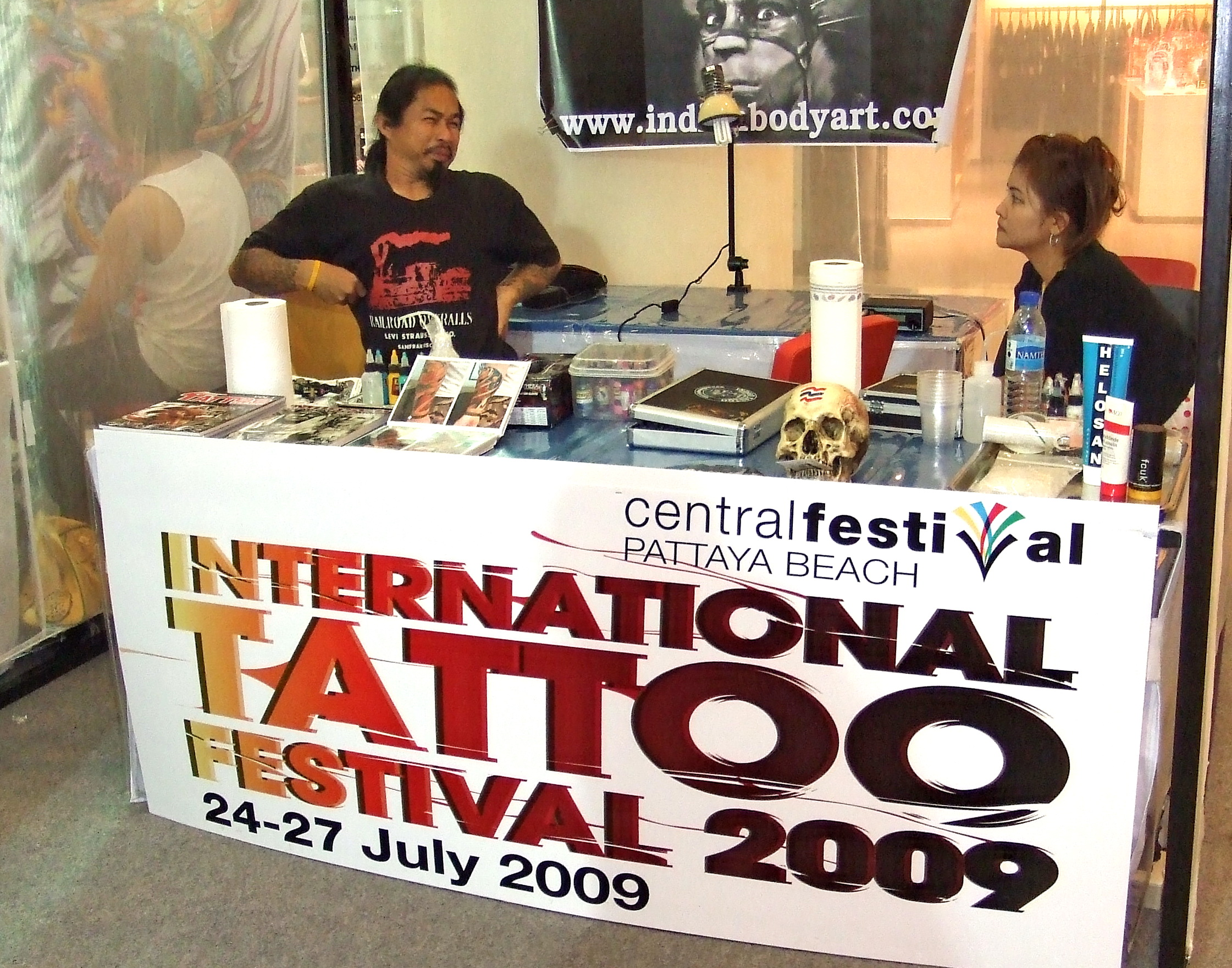
Pattaya Tattoo Festival, 2009

A tattoo convention is a meeting and exhibition for tattoo practitioners and enthusiasts from different shops and areas, as well as anyone who wishes to see the world of tattooing up close.

== History ==
The first world tattoo convention was held by Lyle Tuttle and Dave Yurkew on January 24–25, 1976 in Houston, Texas. Dave Yurkew, who was also President of the North American Tattoo Club went on to host another 6 consecutive World Tattoo Conventions through 1982. Lyle Tuttle was quoted as saying that this was. "The event that changed tattooing forever.”

On January 19–21, 1996, Dave Yurkew and Lyle Tuttle co-hosted the 20th anniversary of the First World Tattoo Convention in Houston, Texas, following up with the 25th anniversary on January 18–21, 2001 in Houston, hosted by Dave Yurkew and John "Big John" G. Stuckey.

The first International Tattoo Artists Association Convention was held in 1977 in Reno, and the first National Convention was held in Denver, Colorado March 23–25, 1979 at the Cosmopolitan Hotel. Speakers at this convention were: Don Ed Hardy, Terry Wrigley, Peter Tat 2 Poulos, Diane Poulos, Bob Shaw, Big Walt Kilkucki, Painless Jeff Baker, Dave Yurkew, and from Germany Horst Streckenbach and Manfred Kohrs.

Tattoo conventions range from small events sponsored by a local business that may last a day, to major international conventions spanning a weekend or the better part of a week.

They may include contests and exhibitions, booths selling tattoo-related items and even booths rented for use by tattoo artists who work during the convention. Collectors may attend conventions specifically to obtain a tattoo from a particular visiting artist.

Other events may include professional events such as workshops and meetings as well as social events.

Contests, usually restricted to registered participants, usually feature a variety of categories: black-and-gray, tribal, oriental, backpiece, women, men, and so on. Judging may be by vote or by a panel of judges.

The first tattoo convention in London, England took place in 2005.

The first tattoo convention in Germany was held in 1980 by Horst Streckenbach in Frankfurt.

== Tattoo conventions in Australia ==
Australia holds some of the biggest tattoo conventions in the southern hemisphere, including Tattoo Expo and Rites of Passage Tattoo Festival, both of which showcase some of the world's leading tattoo artists.

The history of tattooing may go all the way back to the convicts that were being sent to Australia, with a large portion having a singular tattoo, often an anchor or initials. Since then, tattoos have become a large part of Australian life, with one in four Australians having a tattoo, making tattoo conventions a popular destination in Australia.

== Gallery ==
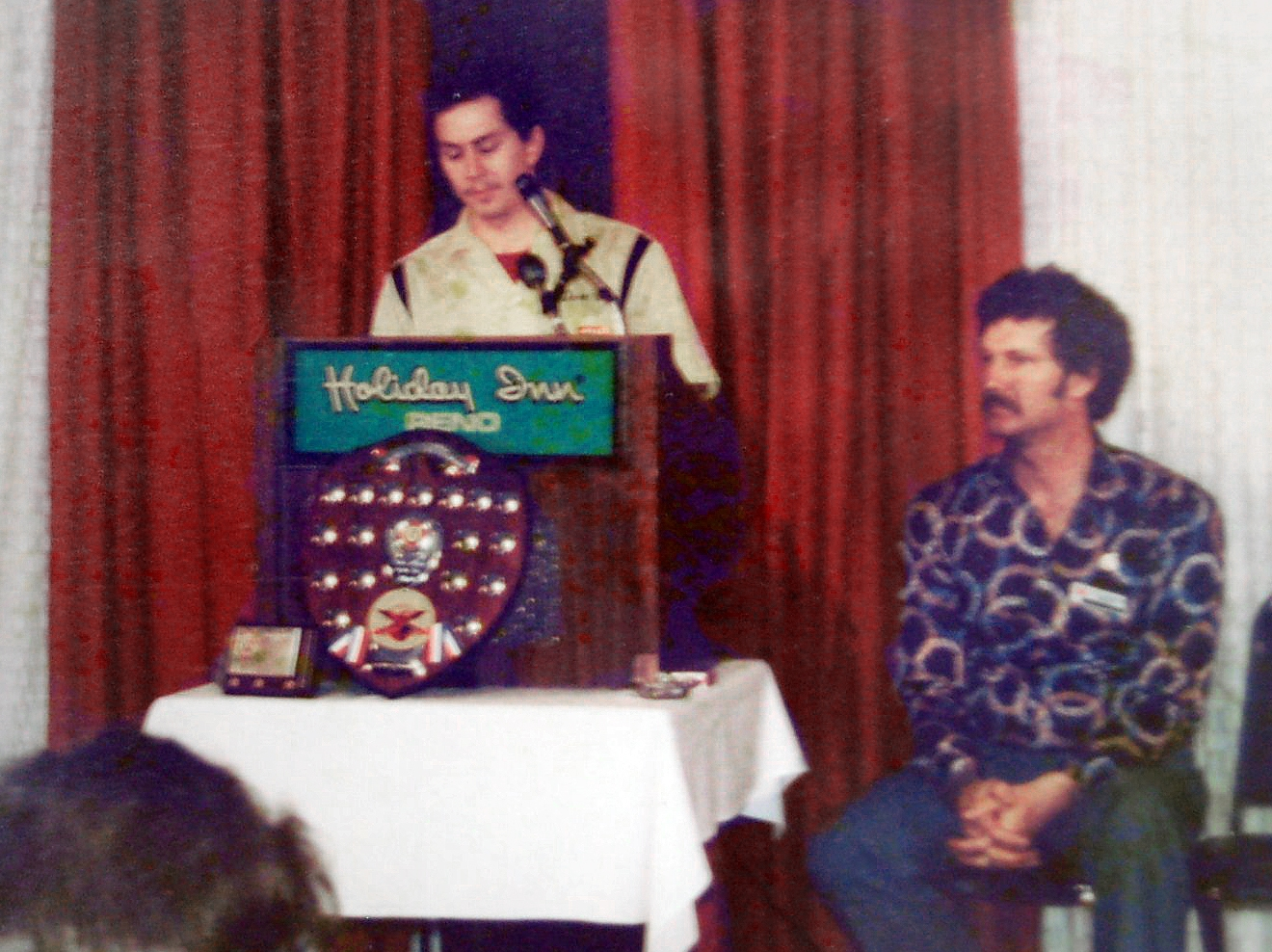
Don Ed Hardy and Dave Yurkew at the 2nd World Tattoo Convention in Reno Nevada, 1977

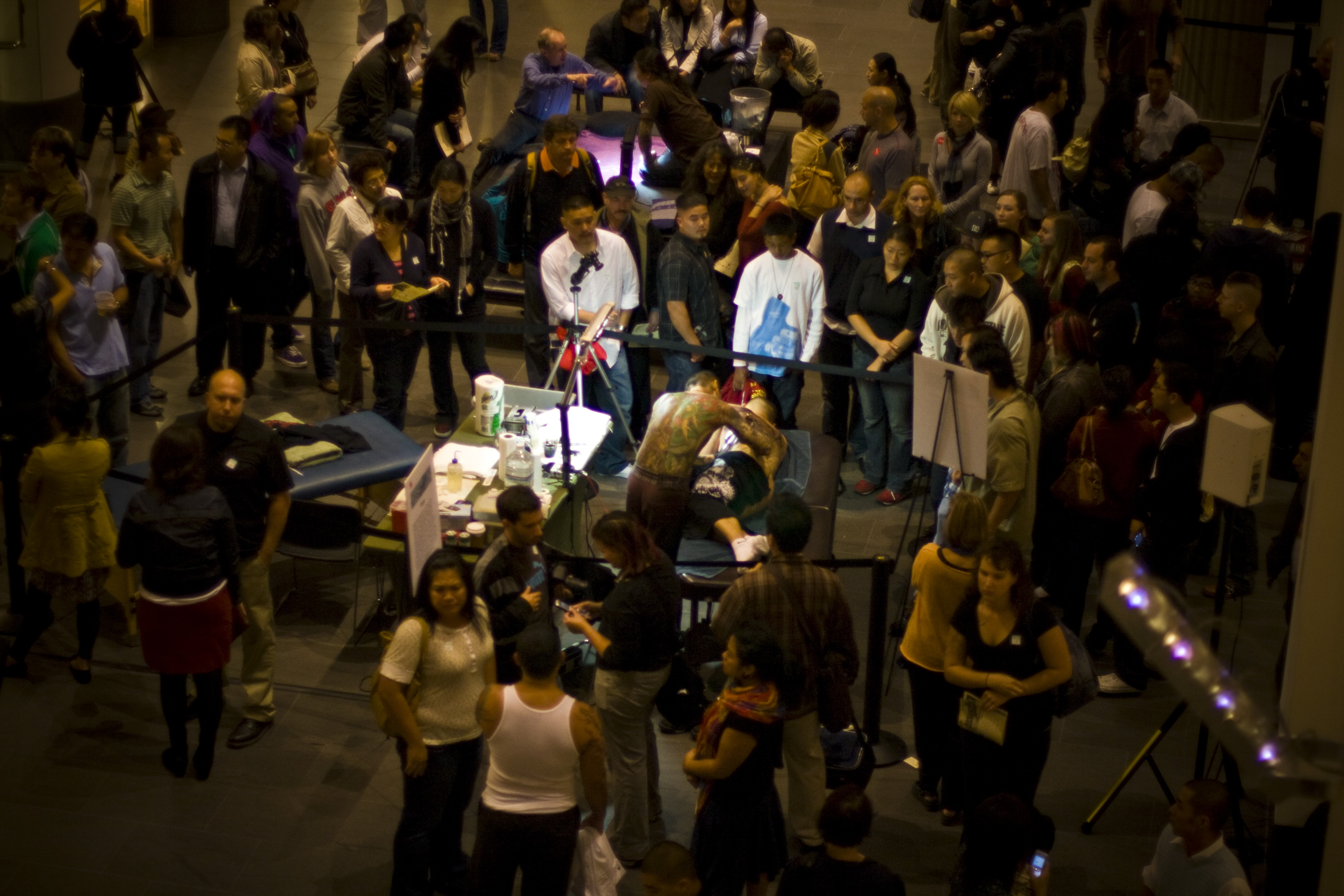
Tattoo convention in Singapore, 2008

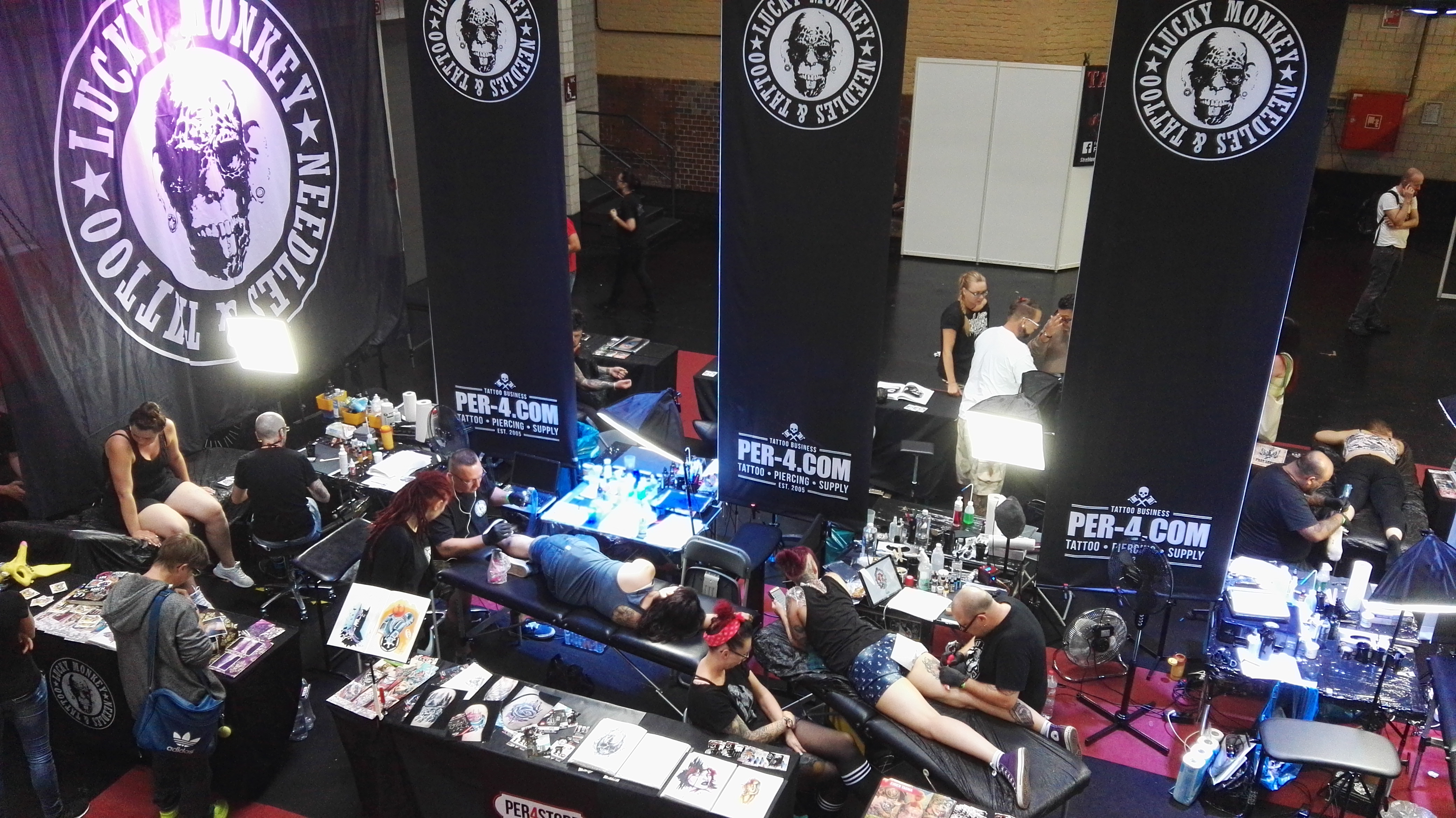
Tattoo convention in Berlin, 2017

Video of a tattoo convention in Boston, 2019
