= Von Dutch =

American fashion brand

- Industry: Men’s and women’s apparel and accessories
- Founded: 2000; 26 years ago
- Headquarters: New Jersey, United States
- Area served: United States, United Kingdom, Indonesia, Brazil, Australia, Europe, Hong Kong, Malaysia, Singapore, China
- Products: Shirts, jackets, shoes, hats, jeans, bags, eyewear, watches, and belts/buckles
- Owner: WSG Brands (White Space Group)
- Parent: WSG
- Website: http://www.vondutch.com/ www.vondutch.com

Von Dutch is an American multinational fashion brand posthumously named after Kenny Howard, a.k.a. "Von Dutch", an American artist and pinstriper of the Kustom Kulture movement. After Howard's death in 1992, his daughters allowed Ed Boswell to produce items using the Von Dutch trademark logo. The trademark rights were sold in 1996 to Mike Cassell who, with Robert Vaughn, used the logo for an apparel line named Von Dutch Originals. French designer Christian Audigier helped popularize the brand in the early 2000s. Von Dutch was repurchased in 2009 by Groupe Royer S.A., through its Luxembourg subsidiary Royer brands International S.a.r.l. In 2024, WSG (White Space Group) purchased the global rights from Groupe Royer S.A.

The clothing brand gained popularity in the US and attracted the attention of celebrities such as Paris Hilton, Whitney Houston, Madonna, Britney Spears, Justin Timberlake, Jay-Z, Ashton Kutcher and Eric Church.

== History ==
=== Kenny Howard ===
Kenneth Robert Howard was an American motorcycle mechanic, artist, pin striper, metal fabricator, knifemaker and gunsmith. The inspiration to create the clothing line started with Howard's daughters Lisa and Lorna after his death. They decided to use his artistic name Von Dutch; "Dutch" was a family nickname for Howard because he was considered to be "as stubborn as a Dutchman".

Howard had passion for cars and motorcycles. He also created special effects for Hollywood films, and served as a consultant for several period films. His most recognizable work was in 1955 at the 1955 Motorama; he was able to stripe a 1927 Studebaker for 10 days. Today, Howard is known as the father of modern pin-striping.

He was famously indifferent about the rights to his work, dismissing copyrights and patents as an "ego trip". He sold the Von Dutch name to fellow pinstriper Steve Kafka for $5,000.

Howard was a virulent racist and admirer of Hitler's Third Reich. “A letter he wrote about abandoning harsh medical treatment for a fatal illness is blunt: ‘I am not willing to go through it anymore only to emerge in a place full of Africans, Mexicans and Jews. … I have always been a Nazi and still believe it was the last time the world had a chance of being operated with logic. What a shame so many Americans died and suffered to make the rich richer and save England & France again, or was that still. I hope you lying wimps get swallowed up with your stupidity,’” he wrote.

Howard died in 1992 of liver failure, resulting from alcoholism.

=== Beginning of the company ===
In the 1990s, art collector Ed Boswell began selling Von Dutch patches at Los Angeles art shows, having procured the rights to the Von Dutch name from Howard's daughters. He met former drug dealer Michael Cassel and competitive surfer Bobby Vaughn at a trade show, and they decided to go into business together, initially deciding to create an apparel line of garage-themed jeans and workwear. Cassel and Vaughn eventually bought Boswell out of the company, and brought in entrepreneur Tonny Sørensen as CEO and investor. Sørensen hired Christian Audigier in 2002 to design for the brand. Audigier came up with the trucker hat, inspired by classic Americana such as Marlon Brando's motorcycle cap in The Wild One.

=== Success ===
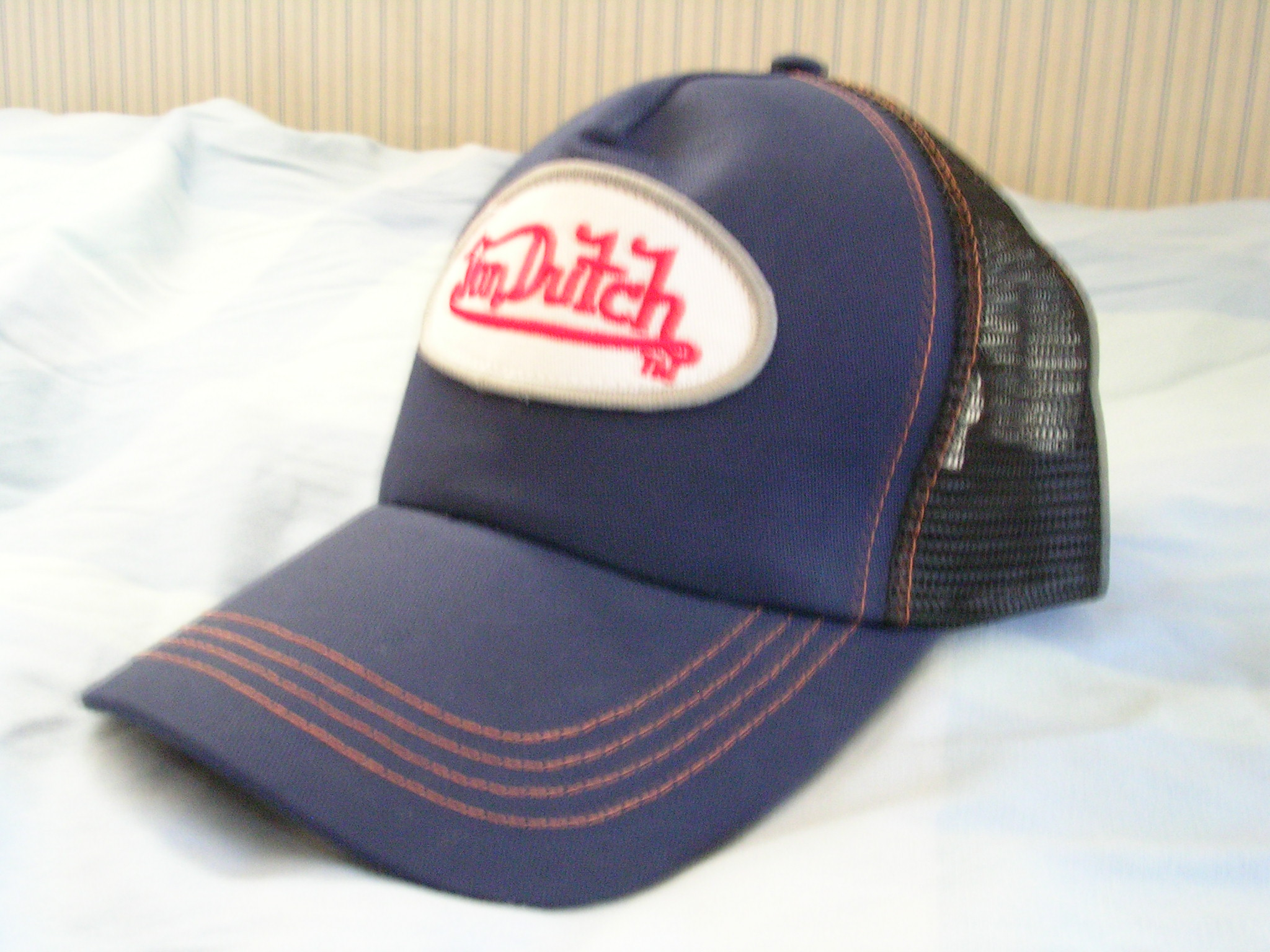
Baseball cap by the brand

The early 2000s were the prime years for the company. Celebrities were spotted wearing a variety of Von Dutch apparel such as jackets, t-shirts, and, most notably, trucker hats. Britney Spears and Justin Timberlake played a vital role in the rise of Von Dutch. Audigier met with Spears in Los Angeles in 2002 and convinced her to wear the brand. Soon afterward, Spears and Timberlake made national news with their breakup, and happened to be wearing Von Dutch trucker hats on the cover of People. The exposure helped grow the brand, and it began selling.

Other celebrities such as Paris Hilton, Lindsay Lohan, Ashton Kutcher, and Beyoncé were seen wearing the $100 trucker hat. Kutcher was constantly seen wearing Von Dutch in the early 2000s, especially on episodes of Punk'd. Von Dutch's popularity peaked in 2003, with sales of over $33 million.

=== Behind-the scenes tumult ===
Sørensen fired Vaughn and became sole owner in 2002. He also began sidelining Cassel as a designer in favor of Audigier. Vaughn and Cassel became openly hostile to Sørensen; at one point, Cassel hired drug lord Pablo Escobar's grandson to intimidate him into selling his stake in the company for $500,000, a proposal that Sørensen refused. Vaughn, meanwhile, tried to intimidate Cassel into selling his shares of the company, and accused him of calling the police when he refused.

In February 2005, Vaughn was arrested on charges of first degree murder after he shot and killed childhood friend Mark Rivas, who he claimed attacked him with a broken bottle. He was acquitted in 2006.

=== Decline ===
By the late 2000s, Von Dutch began to experience a rapid decline due to issues such as brand saturation and counterfeiting. In May 2004, Boswell, who resented Cassel and Vaughn for buying him out of the company just before it became successful, leaked to the press a letter written by Howard in 1992, in which the late artist made several racist and antisemitic remarks and professed admiration for Nazi Germany. Despite Howard having nothing to do with the clothing line, this letter destroyed what little popularity the company had left; by 2004, the fashion press had derisively nicknamed the brand "Von Douche". Audigier left the company in 2007. In 2009, Sorenson sold the brand to French footwear company Groupe Royer.

=== Resurgence ===
In 2016, Von Dutch started to make a comeback when Kylie Jenner was seen wearing the famous trucker hat, jackets and two-piece sets. In 2019 Von Dutch hired Ed Goldman as its general manager, and he started to create connections with Los Angeles' hip-hop community; rappers such as Travis Scott, Saweetie, and Megan Thee Stallion were soon seen wearing the brand on Instagram, and the company partnered with Young Thug in 2021 to create a line of streetwear. Von Dutch also became popular with Internet celebrities such as Emma Chamberlain and Addison Rae. In 2024 Charli XCX released a song named "Von Dutch" as the lead single from her sixth studio album, Brat.

As of 2021, Earl Pickens is the executive director of design.
