= Pinstriping =

Decorative painting technique

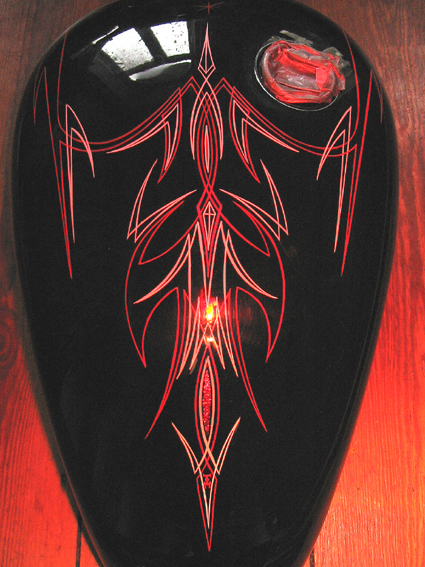
Pin striping on a motorcycle fuel tank.

Pin striping (or pinstriping) is the application of a very thin line of paint or other material called a pin stripe, and is generally used for decoration. Freehand pin stripers use a specialty brush known as a pinstriping brush.

Automotive, bike shops, and do-it-yourself car and motorcycle mechanics use paint pin striping to create their own custom look on the automotive bodies and parts.

== Motorcycles ==
Pin striping can commonly be seen exhibited on custom motorcycles, such as those built by Choppers Inc., Indian Larry, and West Coast Choppers. The decorative use of pin striping on motorcycles as it is commonly seen today was pioneered by artists Kenny Howard (a.k.a. Von Dutch), Dean Jeffries, Dennis "Gibb" Gibbish, and Ed "Big Daddy" Roth. These artists are considered pioneers of the Kustom Kulture lifestyle that spawned in the early 1950s, and are widely recognized as the "originators of modern pin striping".

== Automobiles ==
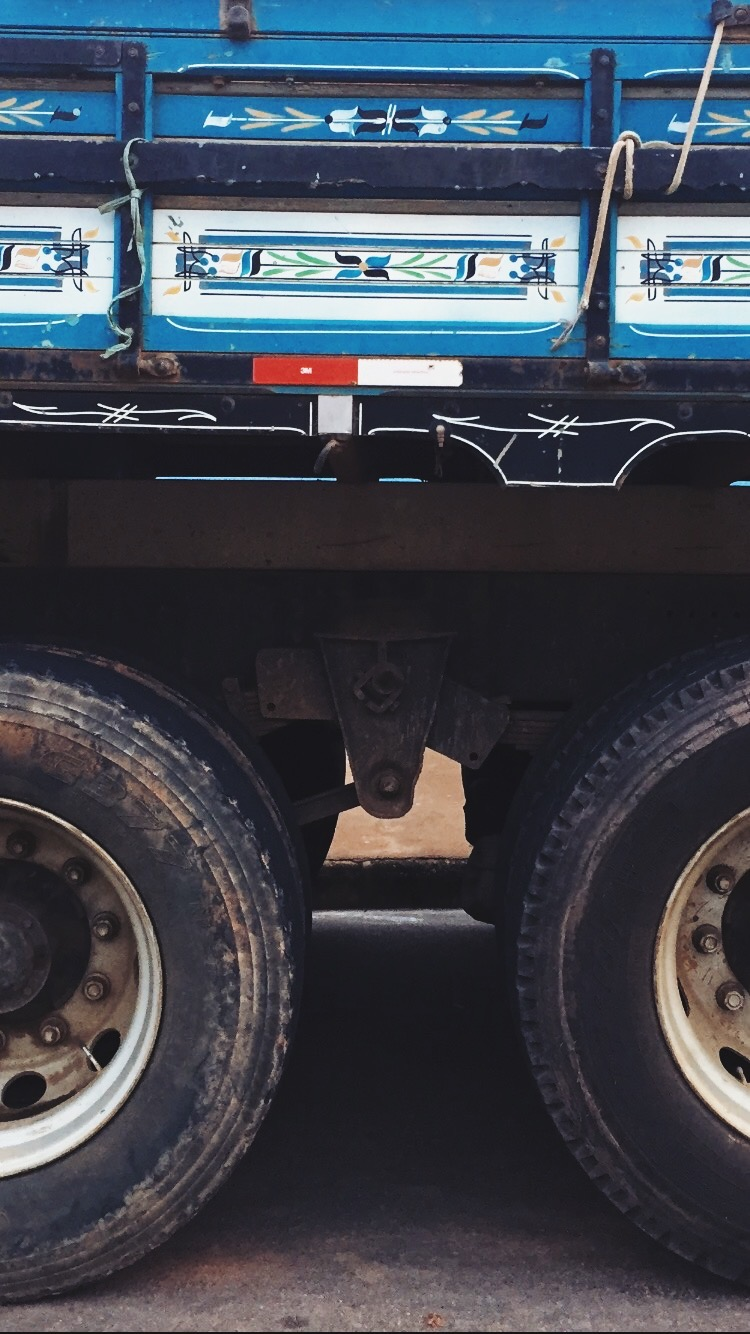
Pin striping on a truck in Minas Gerais, Brazil.

In automotive body work, pin stripes are a thin vinyl tape or paint. The tape versions are adhered directly to the painted surface in the pattern desired, whilst painted ones are done by skilled artists with 'sword' shaped brushes.

The goal of pin striping is to enhance the curves of the surface, and the lines are generally of a complementary color. In any other form of decorative pin stripes, the goal is the same. In addition and coincidentally, it can help to hide flaws in the surface such as a scratch or blemish.

Pin stripe décor is also applied to motorcycles, bicycles, semi trucks, boats, and surfboards. It is traditionally combined with freehand lettering and, to a lesser degree, sign making. The age of computers and vinyl decals helped undercut the base of traditional sign making and with it the traditional pin striper.

While stripers such as Von Dutch (Kenny Howard) and Ed "Big Daddy" Roth are possibly the best known early practitioners of 'modern' pin striping, many of the early stripers cite Tommy "The Greek" Hrones and Dean Jeffries as their major influences.

Pin striping is still practiced at shops around the world, and Rolls-Royce Motor Cars still pin stripes the "coachline" of that company's cars by hand.
