= Kenny Howard =

American artist and mechanic (1929–1992)

Von Dutch
- Born: Kenneth Robert Howard; September 7, 1929; Los Angeles, California, US
- Died: September 19, 1992 (aged 63); Ventura, California, US
- Known for: Hot rod art, gunsmithing, knife making, automobile customizing and pin striping
- Movement: Kustom Kulture

Kenneth Robert Howard (September 7, 1929 – September 19, 1992), also known as Dutch, Von Dutch, or J. L. Bachs (Joe Lunch Box), was an American motorcycle mechanic, artist, pin striper, metal fabricator, knifemaker and gunsmith.

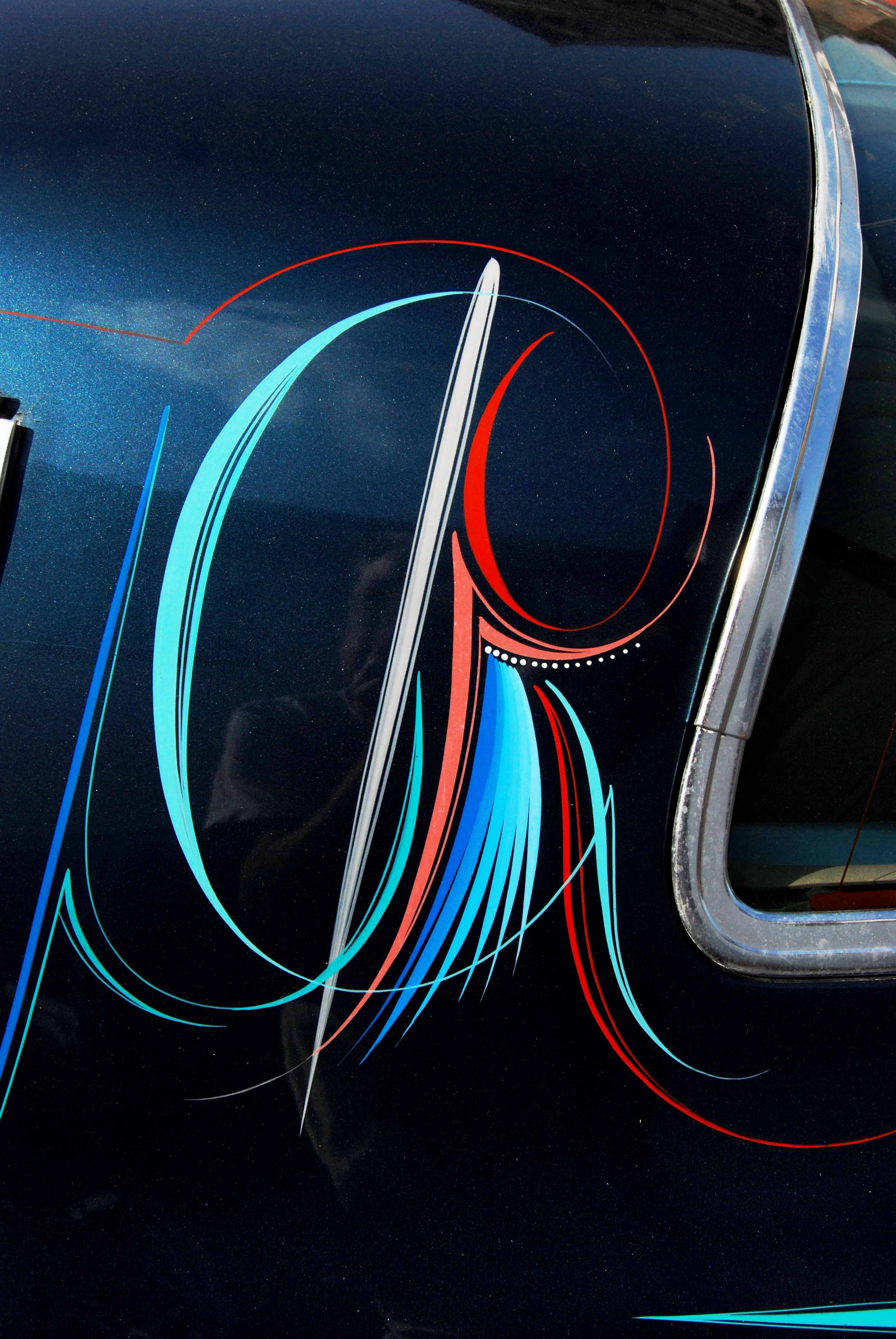
Complex Von Dutch Pin Stripe on Blue Velvet

== Early life ==
As the son of a sign painter, Howard learned to letter and pinstripe professionally by the age of 10. While attending Compton High School, Howard excelled in track and field and was referred to as "the fastest man in LA." Family members gave him the nickname "Dutch" because he was "as stubborn as a Dutchman," he added the "Von" prefix later as an artistic signature.

== Work ==
Howard started earning money in the 1950s by pin-striping along with fellow striper Dean Jeffries. Von Dutch has been a major influence in the customizing of vehicles from the 1950s to today. Some of his famous works include the flying eyeball logo and the custom Kenford truck, along with numerous custom motorcycles and many award-winning custom cars. Among many custom car and motorcycle enthusiasts, he is thought of as one of the fathers of Kustom Kulture.

His most lasting work is the creation of the special "pearlescent" color used to paint movie star Marilyn Monroe's car, known as Candy-Apple Red. Many automobile, motorcycle, bicycle and ATV manufacturers still offer a Candy-Apple Red on their vehicles today.

An avid gunsmith and knife maker, Von Dutch made numerous art knives and embellished firearms. Most of these were adaptations of existing items to which he added his artistic flair. In 1958, Von Dutch designed and produced the "Mare's Leg", a cut-down Winchester rifle for the television series Wanted: Dead or Alive.

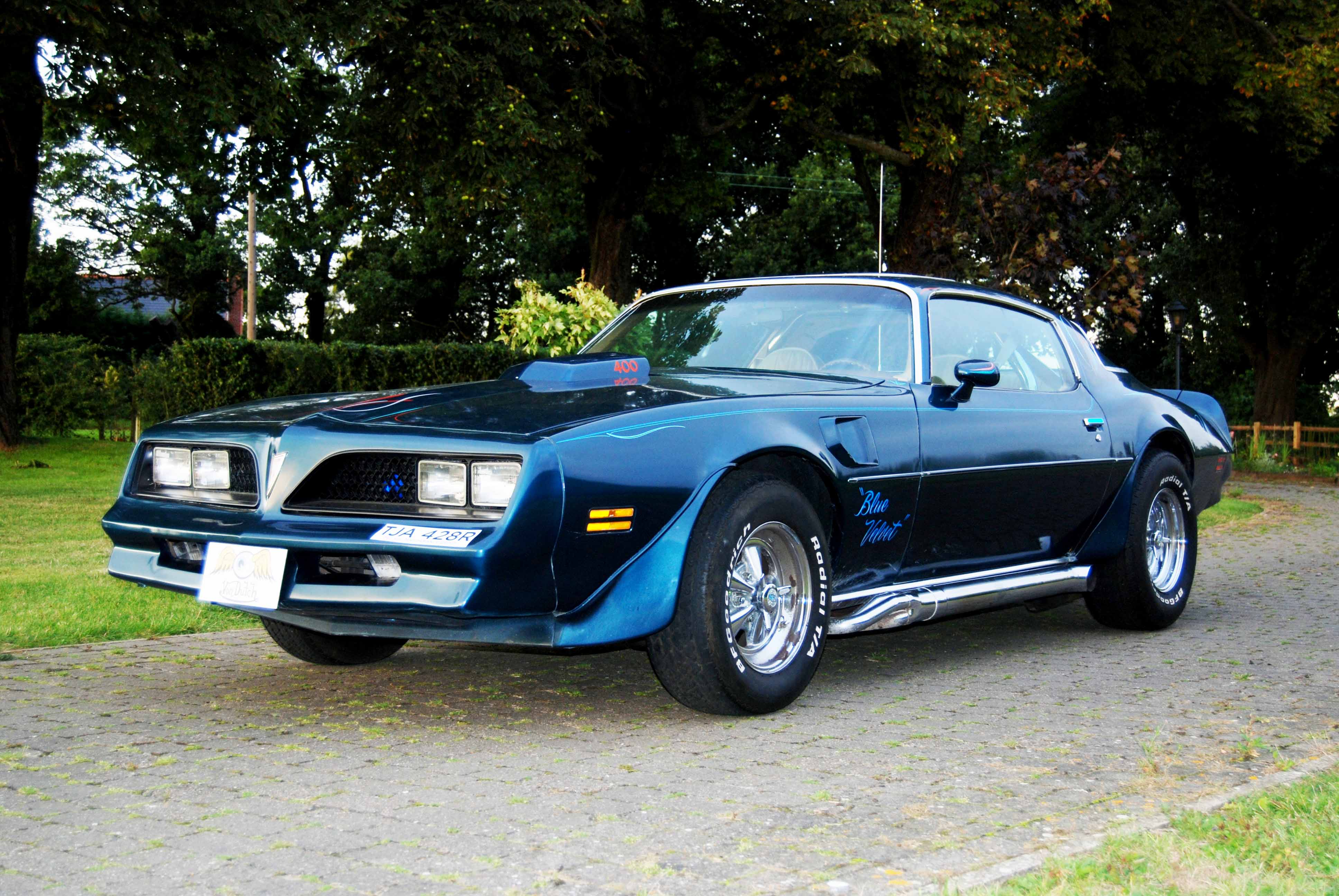
Von Dutch Blue Velvet Pontiac Firebird

Von Dutch completed pin striping the well-known "Blue Velvet" Pontiac Firebird in 1979, which is complete with two perfectly parallel pin stripes extending 16 1/2 feet (5.0 m) down each side of the vehicle. These pin stripes were completed by hand and attained a level of perfection that gave rise to the legend of Von Dutch as a pin striper.

== Death ==
Von Dutch's lifelong alcoholism led to major medical issues later in life. He died on September 19, 1992, from alcohol-related complications, leaving behind his two daughters, Lisa and Lorna. His ashes were scattered in the Pacific Ocean.

== Von Dutch Originals, LLC ==
After his death, his daughters created a clothing line because Dutch left all his prized possessions to the Bruckers. His daughters sold the clothing rights "Von Dutch" name to Michael Cassel and Robert Vaughn. In 2009, the then-CEO of Von Dutch, Tonny Sorensen, sold the company to Groupe Royer, a French footwear company.

== Racism and anti-sociality ==
In January 2004, an OC Weekly article alleged that Howard evinced violent and racist tendencies. Robert Williams, a friend and fellow artist, said Howard was "...quite a racist; didn't like anybody. Howard was accused of having all the trappings of being a neo-Nazi. Another accusation suggested he could not tolerate black people." The article alleges that a letter written shortly before Howard's death in 1992, when he was in the hospital, closed with “Bye, Heil Hitler.” After the publication of the article, a number of retailers removed Von Dutch from their inventory despite its profitability.

In May 2004, Los Angeles Magazine profiled Howard similarly, describing his alcoholism and anti-social behaviour. Von Dutch clothing founder Ed Boswell described Howard as "...as an avid military enthusiast enamored of German Military esthetics. But he was not a white power guy. He hated everybody too much to be one of those. He was a provocateur." In the 2021 documentary “The Curse of Von Dutch: A Brand to Die For” (a three episode mini-series that aired on streaming service Hulu) Ed Boswell admits that he was responsible and now ashamed of “letting the cat out of the bag” about Howard's alleged Nazi beliefs, in order to bring down the clothing brand that allegedly owed him money.

== See also ==
- Hot rod
- Ed Roth
