= List of American Chopper episodes =

This is a list of American Chopper episodes.

== Series overview ==
=== Original series ===
Overall Season	Series Season	Episodes	Originally aired	
Overall Season	Series Season	Episodes	Season premiere	Season finale
Pilots		2	September 29, 2002	January 19, 2003
1	1	29	March 31, 2003	May 10, 2004
2	2	30	June 7, 2004	September 26, 2005
3	3	25	October 3, 2005	August 28, 2006
4	4	25	November 6, 2006	October 18, 2007
5	5	26	January 17, 2008	October 30, 2008
6	6	26	April 9, 2009	February 11, 2010

=== Series spin-off: Senior vs. Junior ===
Overall season	Spin-off season	Episodes	Originally aired	
Overall season	Spin-off season	Episodes	Season premiere	Season finale
7	1	18	August 12, 2010	February 7, 2011
8	2	21	April 25, 2011	November 28, 2011
9	3	13	February 13, 2012	May 21, 2012
10	4	15	September 3, 2012	December 17, 2012

=== Original series revival ===
Overall Season	Series Season	Episodes	Originally aired	
Overall Season	Series Season	Episodes	Season premiere	Season finale
11	7	8	March 1, 2018	July 16, 2018
12	8	8	February 12, 2019	April 2, 2019

== Original series episodes ==
=== Pilots (2002–2003) ===
No. in series	No. in season	Title	Original release date	U.S. viewers (millions)	Overall episode No.
P1	Special–1	"American Chopper I – Jet Bike"	September 29, 2002	N/A	1
Paul Jr. is under the gun to create a one of a kind chopper in time for Laconia Bike Week.
P2	Special–2	"American Chopper II – Biketoberfest (Cody Bike)"	January 19, 2003	N/A	2
Paul Jr. helps out Cody to build a new project bike for display at Biketoberfest.

=== Season 1 (2003–2004) ===
No. in series	No. in season	Title	Original release date	U.S. viewers (millions)	Overall episode No.
1	1	"Black Widow 1"	March 31, 2003	N/A	3
In the 2-part series premiere, Paul Jr. builds a chopper inspired by spiders to take to the New York City's International Motorcycle Show.
2	2	"Black Widow 2"	April 7, 2003	N/A	4
Paul Jr. continues to build a chopper inspired by spiders to take to the New York City's International Motorcycle Show.
3	3	"Race Car 1"	April 14, 2003	N/A	5
Paul Jr. builds a chopper for a client, TrimSpa.
4	4	"Race Car 2"	April 21, 2003	N/A	6
Paul Jr. continues to build a chopper for a client, TrimSpa.
5	5	"Firebike 1"	April 28, 2003	N/A	7
Paul Jr. builds a chopper as a tribute to the 343 New York City firefighters that died in the 9/11 tragedy.
6	6	"Daytona Bike Week"	June 2, 2003	N/A	8
Paul Sr., Paul Jr., Mikey, and Cody go to Daytona Bike Week while Vinnie continues work on the Fire Bike.
7	7	"Firebike 2"	June 9, 2003	N/A	9
Paul Jr. continues to build a chopper as a tribute to the 343 New York City firefighters that died in the 9/11 tragedy.
8	8	"Old School Chopper 1"	June 16, 2003	N/A	10
Cody and Sr. work on an old school themed chopper.
9	9	"Old School Chopper 2 / Commanche 1"	June 30, 2003	N/A	11
Cody and Sr. work on an old school themed chopper while Paul Jr. builds a chopper inspired by the U. S. Army's Comanche helicopter.
10	10	"Commanche 2"	July 7, 2003	N/A	12
Paul Jr. continues to build a chopper inspired by the U. S. Army's Comanche helicopter.
11	11	"Commanche 3"	July 14, 2003	N/A	13
Paul Jr. continues to build a chopper inspired by the U. S. Army's Comanche helicopter.
12	12	"Mikey's Blues Bike 1"	August 11, 2003	N/A	14
Mikey builds his first bike, a blues themed chopper.
13	13	"Mikey's Blues Bike 2"	August 18, 2003	N/A	15
Mikey continues to build his first bike, a blues themed chopper.
SP1	Special–1	"Mikey Special"	November 3, 2003	N/A	16
14	14	"Tool Bike 1"	December 8, 2003	N/A	17
Paul Jr. builds a chopper for a client, Snap-on.
15	15	"Tool Bike 2"	December 15, 2003	N/A	18
Paul Jr. continues to build a chopper for a client, Snap-on.
SP2	Special–2	"OCC Holiday Special (Santa Bike)"	December 22, 2003	N/A	19
16	16	"POW/MIA Bike 1"	January 12, 2004	3.48	20
Paul Sr. builds a classic chopper to honor the Vietnam war.
17	17	"POW/MIA Bike 2"	January 19, 2004	N/A	21
Paul Sr. builds a classic chopper to honor the Vietnam war.
18	18	"POW/MIA Bike 3"	January 26, 2004	4.21	22
Paul Sr. builds a classic chopper to honor the Vietnam war.
19	19	"NY Jets Bike"	February 2, 2004	N/A	23
Paul Jr. builds a New York Jets themed customer bike.
20	20	"Miller Electric 1"	February 9, 2004	N/A	24
Paul Jr. builds another star customer bike for the show.
21	21	"Miller Electric 2"	February 16, 2004	4.03	25
Paul Jr. builds another star customer bike for the show.
22	22	"Leno Bike 1"	February 23, 2004	3.66	26
Paul Jr. builds another star customer bike for the show.
23	23	"Leno Bike 2"	March 1, 2004	3.72	27
Paul Jr. builds another star customer bike for the show.
24	24	"Liberty Bike 1"	April 12, 2004	N/A	28
Paul Jr. builds another star theme bike for the show.
25	25	"Liberty Bike 2"	April 19, 2004	2.45^{†}	29
Paul Jr. builds another star theme bike for the show.
26	26	"Dixie Chopper 1"	May 3, 2004	N/A	30
Paul Jr. builds another star theme bike for the show.
27	27	"Dixie Chopper 2"	May 10, 2004	3.97	31
Paul Jr. builds another star customer bike for the show.

Key
^{†}	Denotes households(millions) instead of viewers(millions)

=== Season 2 (2004–2005) ===
No. in series	No. in season	Title	Original release date	U.S. viewers (millions)	Overall episode No.
28	1	"Mikey/Vinnie Bike 1"	June 7, 2004	N/A	32
Mikey and Vinnie team up while Sr. and Jr. are away to create their dream bike.
29	2	"Mikey/Vinnie Bike 2"	June 14, 2004	N/A	33
Mikey and Vinnie team up while Sr. and Jr. are away to create their dream bike.
30	3	"I, Robot Bike 1"	July 12, 2004	N/A	34
Jr. creates a one of a kind customer bike to complement the I, Robot film.
31	4	"I, Robot Bike 2"	July 19, 2004	N/A	35
Jr. creates a one of a kind customer bike to complement the I, Robot film.
32	5	"Davis Love Bike"	August 2, 2004	N/A	36
Paul Jr. builds a custom chopper for pro golfer Davis Love III.
33	6	"Lance Armstrong Bike 1"	September 27, 2004	N/A	37
The Teutuls make a chopper for legendary cyclist Lance Armstrong.
34	7	"Lance Armstrong Bike 2"	October 4, 2004	N/A	38
The Teutuls make a chopper for legendary cyclist Lance Armstrong.
35	8	"Police Bike 1"	October 11, 2004	N/A	39
Jr. and the gang create a bike complete with sidecar in honor of the NY police.
36	9	"Police Bike 2"	October 18, 2004	N/A	40
Jr. and the gang create a bike complete with sidecar in honor of the NY police.
37	10	"David Mann Bike 1"	November 29, 2004	N/A	41
The Teutuls create an honorary chopper for motorbike artistry legend David Mann.
38	11	"David Mann Bike 2"	December 6, 2004	N/A	42
The Teutuls create an honorary chopper for motorbike artistry legend David Mann.
39	12	"Christmas Sleigh"	December 20, 2004	N/A	43
40	13	"Carroll Shelby Bike 1"	January 31, 2005	N/A	44
OCC builds a bike for legendary car builder Carroll Shelby.
41	14	"Carroll Shelby Bike 2"	February 7, 2005	N/A	45
OCC builds a bike for legendary car builder Carroll Shelby.
42	15	"Lincoln Mark LT Bike 1"	February 14, 2005	N/A	46
Paul Jr. builds a chopper for the launch of the new Lincoln Mark LT.
43	16	"Lincoln Mark LT Bike 2"	February 21, 2005	N/A	47
Paul Jr. builds a chopper for the launch of the new Lincoln Mark LT.
SP3	Special–1	"The Best of American Chopper: Sr. vs. Jr."	February 28, 2005	N/A	48
44	17	"Junior's Dream Bike 1"	March 7, 2005	N/A	49
Paul Jr. builds his dream chopper.
45	18	"Junior's Dream Bike 2"	March 14, 2005	N/A	50
Paul Jr. builds his dream chopper.
46	19	"Caterpillar Bike 1"	April 4, 2005	N/A	51
Paul Jr. builds another star customer bike for the show.
47	20	"Caterpillar Bike 2"	April 11, 2005	N/A	52
Paul Jr. builds another star customer bike for the show.
48	21	"Gillette Bike 1"	April 18, 2005	N/A	53
Paul Jr. builds another star customer bike for the show.
49	22	"Gillette Bike 2"	April 25, 2005	N/A	54
Paul Jr. builds another star customer bike for the show.
SP4	Special–2	"The Best of American Chopper: Micheal Teutul as himself"	May 2, 2005	N/A	55
50	23	"NAPA Drag Bike 1"	June 6, 2005	N/A	56
Paul Jr. builds a bike to take drag racing.
51	24	"NAPA Drag Bike 2"	June 13, 2005	N/A	57
Paul Jr. builds a bike to take drag racing.
52	25	"Jr/Sr Military Tribute Bikes 1"	September 5, 2005	N/A	58
OCC builds two choppers, one new-age chopper by Jr. and another old school chopper by Sr. to auction off in an appeal to raise proceeds for the families of soldiers lost or injured in battle.
53	26	"Jr/Sr Military Tribute Bikes 2"	September 12, 2005	N/A	59
OCC builds two choppers, one new-age chopper by Jr. and another old school chopper by Sr. to auction off in an appeal to raise proceeds for the families of soldiers lost or injured in battle.
54	27	"NY Yankees Bike 1"	September 19, 2005	N/A	60
OCC builds a bike for the New York Yankees.
55	28	"NY Yankees Bike 2"	September 26, 2005	N/A	61
OCC builds a bike for the New York Yankees.

=== Season 3 (2005–2006) ===
No. in series	No. in season	Title	Original release date	U.S. viewers (millions)	Overall episode No.
56	1	"Space Shuttle Tribute Bike 1"	October 3, 2005	N/A	62
Paul Jr. creates a bike in tribute to the Columbia spacecraft disaster.
57	2	"Space Shuttle Tribute Bike 2"	October 10, 2005	N/A	63
Paul Jr. creates a bike in tribute to the Columbia spacecraft disaster.
58	3	"Rick's Dream Bike 1"	October 17, 2005	N/A	64
Rick gets a chance to build his ultimate bike.
59	4	"Rick's Dream Bike 2"	October 24, 2005	N/A	65
Rick gets a chance to build his ultimate bike.
60	5	"On The Road – Europe – Part 1"	October 31, 2005	N/A	66
The family takes a long awaited vacation to Europe.
61	6	"On The Road – Europe – Part 2"	November 7, 2005	N/A	67
The family takes a long awaited vacation to Europe.
SP5	Special–1	"History of the OCC"	November 14, 2005	N/A	68
SP6	Special–2	"Behind the Scenes"	November 21, 2005	N/A	69
SP7	Special–3	"Make-A-Wish Bike"	December 19, 2005	N/A	70
62	7	"FANtasy Bike 1 – Jeff Clegg (Corporal Punishment)"	January 9, 2006	N/A	71
The first FANtasy bike winner, Jeff Clegg (Corporal Punishment bike).
63	8	"FANtasy Bike 2 – Susan Morisset (Female Snake Bike)"	January 16, 2006	N/A	72
The second FANtasy bike winner, Susan Morisset (Female Snake Bike).
64	9	"FANtasy Bike 3 – Joseph McClendon (Custom Hog)"	January 23, 2006	N/A	73
The third FANtasy bike winner, Joseph McClendon (Custom Hog)
65	10	"FANtasy Bike 4 – Bryan King (Vertebrate Trike)"	January 30, 2006	N/A	74
The fourth FANtasy bike winner, Bryan King (Vertebrate Trike).
66	11	"Senior's Vintage Project 1"	February 27, 2006	N/A	75
Paul Sr. restores a vintage bike and designs a new vintage-inspired chopper.
67	12	"Senior's Vintage Project 2"	March 6, 2006	N/A	76
Paul Sr. restores a vintage bike and designs a new vintage-inspired chopper.
SP8	Special–4	"Never Seen Before Special"	March 13, 2006	N/A	77
68	13	"Billy Joel Bike"	April 24, 2006	N/A	78
OCC creates an Indian bobber for musician Billy Joel. (This episode was shown as a two-hour presentation)
69	14	"Wendy's Bike 1"	June 5, 2006	N/A	79
OCC builds a bike for Wendy's to benefit the Dave Thomas Foundation for Adoption.
70	15	"Wendy's Bike 2"	June 12, 2006	N/A	80
OCC builds a bike for Wendy's to benefit the Dave Thomas Foundation for Adoption.
71	16	"Sunoco Bike 1"	June 19, 2006	N/A	81
OCC builds a bike for Sunoco to benefit the Victory Junction Gang Camp.
72	17	"Sunoco Bike 2"	June 26, 2006	N/A	82
OCC builds a bike for Sunoco to benefit the Victory Junction Gang Camp.
73	18	"Bill Murray Bike 1"	August 7, 2006	N/A	83
OCC builds a chopper for Bill Murray inspired by his character in the movie Caddyshack.
74	19	"Bill Murray Bike 2"	August 14, 2006	N/A	84
OCC builds a chopper for Bill Murray inspired by his character in the movie Caddyshack.
75	20	"OCC Roadshow"	August 21, 2006	N/A	85
OCC creates a bike on stage for their fans.
76	21	"OCC Production Bike"	August 28, 2006	N/A	86
OCC designs a bike to be mass produced for the public.

=== Season 4 (2006–2007) ===
No. in series	No. in season	Title	Original release date	U.S. viewers (millions)	Overall episode No.
77	1	"LUGZ Bike 1"	November 6, 2006	N/A	87
OCC designs a boot-themed bike for the Lugz Footwear Company.
78	2	"LUGZ Bike 2"	November 13, 2006	N/A	88
OCC designs a boot-themed bike for the Lugz Footwear Company.
79	3	"Eragon Bike 1"	December 4, 2006	N/A	89
OCC designs a dragon-themed bike inspired by the movie Eragon.
80	4	"Eragon Bike 2"	December 11, 2006	N/A	90
OCC designs a dragon-themed bike inspired by the movie Eragon.
81	5	"Senior Vs. Junior 1"	January 18, 2007	N/A	91
Paul Sr. challenges Paul Jr. to a competition to build OCC's next production bike.
82	6	"Senior Vs. Junior 2"	January 25, 2007	N/A	92
Paul Sr. challenges Paul Jr. to a competition to build OCC's next production bike.
83	7	"Go Daddy 1"	February 1, 2007	N/A	93
OCC designs a chopper for GoDaddy.com.
84	8	"Go Daddy 2"	February 8, 2007	N/A	94
OCC designs a chopper for GoDaddy.com.
85	9	"Flowjet Bike 1"	February 15, 2007	N/A	95
OCC designs a bike for Flow International Corp., makers of the Flowjet.
86	10	"Flowjet Bike 2"	February 22, 2007	N/A	96
OCC designs a bike for Flow International Corp., makers of the Flowjet.
87	11	"HP 1"	March 29, 2007	N/A	97
OCC designs a chopper for Hewlett-Packard.
88	12	"HP 2"	April 5, 2007	N/A	98
OCC designs a chopper for Hewlett-Packard.
89	13	"Peavey 1"	April 12, 2007	N/A	99
OCC designs a guitar-themed chopper for Peavey Electronics.
90	14	"Peavey 2"	April 19, 2007	N/A	100
OCC designs a guitar-themed chopper for Peavey Electronics.
91	15	"Australia 1"	May 31, 2007	N/A	101
The Teutul family takes a vacation to Australia.
92	16	"Australia 2"	June 7, 2007	N/A	102
The Teutul family takes a vacation to Australia and make a bike for South Sydney Rabbitohs
93	17	"Australia 3"	June 14, 2007	N/A	103
The Teutul family takes a vacation to Australia.
94	18	"Intel 1"	July 12, 2007	N/A	104
OCC designs a bike for Intel Corporation.
95	19	"Intel 2"	July 19, 2007	N/A	105
OCC designs a bike for Intel Corporation.
96	20	"EDS/Byron Nelson Championship Bike 1"	July 26, 2007	N/A	106
OCC designs three choppers honoring golfer Byron Nelson.
97	21	"EDS/Byron Nelson Championship Bike 2"	August 2, 2007	N/A	107
OCC designs three choppers honoring golfer Byron Nelson.
98	22	"Silver State Choppers' Chopper 1"	August 30, 2007	N/A	108
OCC designs a bike for Silver State Helicopters.
99	23	"Silver State Choppers' Chopper 2"	September 6, 2007	N/A	109
OCC designs a bike for Silver State Helicopters.
100	24	"Iowa Farm Bureau Bike 1"	October 11, 2007	N/A	110
OCC designs a bike for the Iowa Farm Bureau.
101	25	"Iowa Farm Bureau Bike 2"	October 18, 2007	N/A	111
OCC designs an ethanol fueled bike for the Iowa Farm Bureau. Vinny quits.

=== Season 5 (2008) ===
No. in series	No. in season	Title	Original release date	U.S. viewers (millions)	Overall episode No.
102	1	"Army National Guard 1"	January 17, 2008	N/A	112
OCC locks and loads as it pays tribute to the troops with a custom bike for the Army National Guard. Paul Sr. takes a walk down the aisle with Beth. Using concepts sent in by the troops, Paul Jr. and Jason Pohl get started on the design. Then, after fabrication begins, Cody steps up to fill a void, and Sr. takes him under his wing.
103	2	"Army National Guard 2"	January 24, 2008	N/A	113
OCC marches forward with the Army National Guard Patriot Bike. With assembly looming, an eager Jason Pohl has the opportunity to advance his training. But Pohl's ignorance of shop rules creates tension amongst the crew, and Sr. hosts some injured vets to pay tribute to their sacrifice.
104	3	"Michigan Bike/My Name Is Earl 1"	January 31, 2008	N/A	114
Mikey gets in the game and heads up OCC's latest creation -- a Wolverine bike for the University of Michigan's Mott Children's Hospital. The cast from NBC's "My Name is Earl" bursts onto the scene and gets the OCC team to build a My Name is Earl bike.
105	4	"Michigan Bike/My Name Is Earl 2"	February 7, 2008	N/A	115
Mikey reveals the University of Michigan bike at Michigan-OSU football game Then the guys are off to Hollywood for a reveal party with the cast of NBC's show "My Name is Earl".
106	5	"Gander Mountain 1"	February 14, 2008	N/A	116
OCC packs its equipment and moves on to its next project -- a custom chopper for Gander Mountain, an outdoor lifestyle company. As design gets under way, Jr. decides to go with an off-road theme. But a disagreement over fabrication ignites into a full-scale blowout that brings the project to a screeching halt.
107	6	"Gander Mountain 2"	February 21, 2008	N/A	117
OCC continues on its latest custom creation -- a street bike/motocross hybrid for the outdoor lifestyle company Gander Mountain. The Teutuls travel to Brazil to unveil a special bike and find themselves invited to the presidential palace. Back at the shop, doubts about Pohl's abilities quickly resurface, and his inexperience tests Sr.'s patience. Mikey steps in and challenges the old man to a competition that fosters some father-son bonding.
108	7	"Craftsman/Die Hard 1"	February 28, 2008	N/A	118
OCC charges up its latest double build: Sr.'s custom creation for Craftsman Tools, and Jr.'s two-wheeled showpiece for DieHard Batteries. The guys travel to South Africa, where they immerse themselves in the local bike culture and head to the bush, to make some new friends. But back at the shop, Craftsman drops the hammer and sends Sr. and Pohl back to the drawing board.
109	8	"Craftsman/Die Hard 2"	March 6, 2008	N/A	119
OCC continues on its latest double build - custom bikes for Craftsman Tools and DieHard Batteries. After a jam session with rock 'n' roll legend Chubby Checker gets the crew doing the twist, both teams race into assembly and the Sr.-Jr. rivalry heats up. But as Team Craftsman is delayed, Team DieHard pulls ahead and Mikey moves forward with his latest project, recruiting Sr. to lend a hand. Once Mikey's unusual creation passes its test, Sr. and his team must rally to get their Craftsman project done.
110	9	"Klipsch Bike"	March 13, 2008	N/A	120
OCC tunes in and cranks it up, as it builds a custom bike for Klipsch Audio Technologies. But staffing shortages around the shop have the crew scrambling, forcing Sr. to amp everyone up on a quest to hire new people.
111	10	"Viega Corporation Bike"	March 20, 2008	N/A	121
OCC pulls out all the stops and takes on a project for the plumbing and heating technology company, Viega Corporation. Manpower issues continue to plague the shop, and company demands push JQ to the limit.
112	11	"BSN Bike"	April 24, 2008	N/A	122
OCC pumps it up on its latest custom creation for nutritional supplement company, BSN. During fabrication Jr. & Sr. go face to face over missing tools, and the Girls of BSN stop in to lend a hand.
113	12	"Manitowoc Crane Company Bike"	May 1, 2008	N/A	123
OCC creates an industrial-themed bike for the Manitowoc Crane Group. As the build moves forward and the theme comes to life, Mikey lectures a group of second graders.
114	13	"Production Bike Showcase"	May 8, 2008	N/A	124
The motorcycle industry singles out OCC for a prestigious award. But with no production bikes in house, the crew scrambles to get more built for the award showcase. With mock-up underway, the Teutuls head south with some new bikes and a reunion with Russell Crowe.
115	14	"Dryvit Bike"	June 12, 2008	N/A	125
OCC moves into its new World Headquarters and takes on its first build in the new shop; a penguin-themed chopper for exterior insulation manufacturer, Drvyit Systems.
116	15	"New York Giants Bike"	June 19, 2008	N/A	126
Paul Sr. gets the green light for Paul Jr. to design and build a custom chopper honoring the World Champion NY Giants. As Jr.'s freeform style inspires the build, OCC prepares for the grand opening of its new World HQ. The Teutuls huddle up to make the final decision on OCC's employee search.
117	16	"Darien Lake Bike"	June 26, 2008	N/A	127
OCC twists and turns into its next project: the OCC Motocoaster bike for the Darien Lake Theme Park Resort. The Teutuls go west for an on-camera reunion and a guest spot on the TV show My Name is Earl, where the Earl cast gets some payback.
118	17	"Sikorsky Bike"	July 10, 2008	N/A	128
Sr. recruits JQ and Jason Pohl to build a tribute bike for Sikorsky Aircraft, but fabrication hits some turbulence due to issues with the backbone and tank. The Teutuls take time out to treat special guests from the United Way to some outdoor fun. Back on the build, Sr's team bails out, forcing him to coax them back on board to get the project done.
119	18	"Mercedes–AMG Bike"	July 24, 2008	N/A	129
The Teutuls get inspired by some high-end automotive engineering and build a luxury-performance bike for Mercedes Benz-AMG. Sr. taps a local artist to immortalize his kids in ink, and then takes some time to get away, with his best friend, Gus. The guys touch the past when they experience a piece of motorcycle history.
120	19	"Strike Ten Entertainment Bike"	August 7, 2008	N/A	130
OCC takes on a bowling-themed bike for Strike Ten Entertainment. Rick rolls a strike with his bowling ball tank, while Sr. takes Mikey to the farm and makes like a matador. The guys get into the spirit of the build and make an outing to the local lanes.
121	20	"McCuff Bike"	August 21, 2008	N/A	131
122	21	"RJR Memorial Car Show"	September 11, 2008	N/A	132
123	22	"Web Bike: Special Edition"	September 18, 2008	N/A	133
124	23	"Steve Wyrick and Icee Bikes"	October 9, 2008	N/A	134
125	24	"Aaron Bike"	October 16, 2008	N/A	135
126	25	"Dodge Ram Bike"	October 23, 2008	N/A	136
127	26	"Schussler Bike"	October 30, 2008	N/A	137

=== Season 6 (2009–2010) ===
No. in series	No. in season	Title	Original release date	U.S. viewers (millions)	Overall episode No.
128	1	"NHL Bike/B–2 Bomber Bike"	April 9, 2009	N/A	138
129	2	"Woodstock/Ringling And Barnum And Bailey Circus Bikes"	April 16, 2009	N/A	139
130	3	"DECA Bike/Col–Met Bike"	April 23, 2009	N/A	140
131	4	"Unique Machine Bike"	April 30, 2009	N/A	141
132	5	"10th Anniversary OCC Bike"	May 7, 2009	N/A	142
133	6	"Teutul Triumph Bike"	May 14, 2009	N/A	143
134	7	"Mountain Creek Bike"	May 21, 2009	N/A	144
135	8	"Howe Caverns"	May 28, 2009	N/A	145
136	9	"Pilot Pen Bike And Ducati Bike"	June 4, 2009	N/A	146
137	10	"Jon & Kate Plus 8 Bike"	June 11, 2009	N/A	147
Construction of a bike for Jon Gosselin with an additional scooter for Kate Gosselin. (Jon & Kate Plus 8 also featured a crossover episode called "Bikes & Trikes")
138	11	"Abu Dhabi Police Bike"	June 18, 2009	N/A	148
139	12	"Chesapeake Energy Bike"	June 25, 2009	N/A	149
140	13	"Saginaw Chippewa Indian Tribal Theme Bike"	October 22, 2009	N/A	150
141	14	"OCC Band Bike"	October 29, 2009	N/A	151
142	15	"Siemens Electric Bike"	November 5, 2009	N/A	152
143	16	"Ornge Rescue Bike"	November 12, 2009	N/A	153
144	17	"Mark Buehrle Bike"	November 19, 2009	N/A	154
145	18	"Iraq Star Foundation Bike"	December 3, 2009	N/A	155
146	19	"OCC Trike Bike"	December 10, 2009	N/A	156
147	20	"The Jeanette Lee "Black Widow" Bike"	December 17, 2009	N/A	157
148	21	"Christopher and Dana Reeve Foundation Bike"	January 7, 2010	N/A	158
149	22	"Schneider Electric Bike"	January 14, 2010	N/A	159
150	23	"Gladiator Garageworks Bike"	January 21, 2010	N/A	160
151	24	"Monster Diesel Bike"	January 28, 2010	N/A	161
152	25	"Stewart–Haas Racing Bike"	February 4, 2010	N/A	162
153	26	"The Kobalt Bike"	February 11, 2010	N/A	163
The series finale.

== Original series revival episodes ==
=== Season 11 (2018) ===
No. in series	No. in season	Title	Original release date	U.S. viewers (millions)	Overall episode No.
154	1	"Welcome Back"	March 1, 2018	1.36	164
After 10 years apart, the Teutuls are back. Paul Sr. and Orange County Choppers work on two bikes for Okada Resort in Manila, Philippines. Paul Jr. at Paul Jr. Designs builds a bike for Buffalo Chip Campground in Sturgis, South Dakota. Later, father and son come together to restore their Yankees bike which had been vandalized when it was sold to a salvage yard.
155	2	"Getting the Bike Back Together"	May 28, 2018	1.33	165
OCC builds one of their fastest bikes yet when they create a racing bike for a speed boat racer sponsored by Geico. Paul Jr. Designs (PJD) finishes building the Buffalo Chip Campground bike and he unveils it at Sturgis. Later, Senior and Junior find it a challenge restoring the Yankees bike together. Senior awkwardly leaves, finding it hard to let go of their past.
156	3	"A New Chopter"	June 4, 2018	1.33	166
OCC gets an exclusive deal to build two custom choppers to sell directly to the public at Alan Jay's, an exotic car dealership in St. Petersburg, Florida. PJD finishes a bike build for Rogo Fastener Co. and unveils it across town. Later, Senior finally confronts Junior about how he feels reading the harsh words his son wrote about him in his book a year and a half ago.
157	4	"Metal Health"	June 11, 2018	1.19	167
OCC gets a visit from a psychologist from the Peace of Mind Foundation who wants them to build two bikes; one before mental illness treatment (a rough and raw cafe-style racer) and one after treatment (a sleek and shiny chopper). PJD designs an ethanol-fueled bike for Renewable Fuels Association and unveils it at the East Kansas Agri-Energy plant. Later, Junior wants to change the paint design to pinstripes on the Yankees bike, but compromises with Senior who wants to keep it the same.
158	5	"GTO, Bro!"	June 18, 2018	1.24	168
OCC builds a 1965 Pontiac GTO-inspired bike for long-time clients. Fearing that this massive job may cause Senior to miss his first deadline, he enlists German fabricator Aykut Tataroglu to help finish the bike in 4 weeks. They unveil it at the Celebration Exotic Car Festival. PJD designs a bike for Genie, a garage door company and they unveil it at the International Garage Door Convention in Las Vegas. While building the Yankees bike, Junior changes the gas tank without his father's permission, but since it is an improvement, Senior approves it.
159	6	"Drop the Mikey"	June 25, 2018	1.13	169
OCC designs an old school raked-out chopper for M. Mayo Striping, a family asphalt painting company. Senior wants Mikey to take on a bigger role by helping him build the bike. Meanwhile, PJD creates a trike after previously building a bike and a car for One Call Concepts to raise awareness to dial 811 before you dig. Later, Senior and Junior ask former Yankees catcher Jorge Posada for help collecting autographs for the Yankees bike while at the 20th anniversary celebration of David Wells perfect game.
160	7	"Road Warrior"	July 9, 2018	0.91	170
OCC takes on 4-week build for Joe De Sena, founder of the Spartan Race who wants a Spartan warrior-inspired bike. Senior calls on fabricator Josh Allison from Cry Baby Cycles to design the tank and they unveil it at one of the outdoor courses in Tuxedo, New York which they competed on. PJD designs a loud big-wheeled trike for repeat client Carolina Carports, and unveil it at their facility in Mount Airy, North Carolina. Later, Mikey surprises Senior on his birthday with an explosive weapon and test it out at the shop.
161	8	"Yanks for the Memories"	July 16, 2018	1.15	171
OCC designs a modern military bike for Grunt Style, a military-style clothing company who wants to auction it off to raise money for TAPS to benefit families of fallen soldiers. PJD builds a western movie themed bike for country music artist Clay Walker to raise awareness for MS and they unveil it at his charity open in Pebble Beach, CA. Later, Senior and Junior are on the home stretch with the Yankees bike and they begin assembly with former Yankee outfielder Bernie Williams and unveil it with Chris Rose show on MLB Network. When Rose asks them to build a bike for MLB, Junior is taken aback when Senior suggests he take on the project. Also, Mikey starts his own OCC clothing line.

=== Season 12 (2019) ===
No. in series	No. in season	Title	Original release date	U.S. viewers (millions)	Overall episode No.
162	1	"Chopper Up the Middle"	February 12, 2019	0.74	172
Senior and Junior begin restoring a 1951 Buick Roadmaster, but they don't always go by the book. Senior risks everything by moving designs away from their famous choppers and focuses on building bobbers. He starts a bike for Hydromat, a custom machine tool-builder company and meets them at their headquarters in St. Louis, Missouri to discuss a design. Junior follows up his opportunity from last season by challenging himself to build a streamlined bike for the MLB Network to impress Senior who recommended him for the job.
163	2	"Teutel Recall"	February 19, 2019	0.80	173
Senior and Junior get together along with Mickey and cousin Nick to test out a new amphibious ATV from Sherp. Commercial trucking company Trünorth Warranty asks Junior to design a bike inspired by a futuristic big rig, but the massive amount of fab crushes his schedule. The OCC team builds a vintage military style bike with a sidecar that has a World War II bomber plane theme to benefit for Oscar Mike, a foundation for wounded and disabled veterans.
164	3	"Senior's Moment"	February 26, 2019	0.94	174
Senior goes back to his roots by visiting his old house where he built his first softail bike. While there he finds inspiration to start his "Senior Series", a 50s and 60s throwback line of affordable motorcycles (a rigid and a swingarm), to sell out of the OCC showroom. Junior challenges himself by building a tactical style bike for Gatorz Eyewear using multiple aluminum parts the company uses for their eyeglasses.
165	4	"SPLAT!"	March 5, 2019	0.82	175
OCC builds an aggressive café racer-style paintball-themed bike for NXL professional paintball player Greg Hastings, but Senior and fabricator Josh clash over creative design. Meanwhile, Junior designs a family farm-inspired bike for the North Dakota Farmers Union with a tractor seat, an art mural tank, and a surprise element; a hitch with a trailer. Later, Senior and Junior attempt to get the Buick running in time to celebrate Junior's 44th birthday. Also, PJD's 9/11 Memorial bike gets permanently installed in the Tribute Walk at the new World Trade Center Museum.
166	5	"Guitar Hero"	March 12, 2019	0.68	176
Senior takes on a build for the Vietnam War traveling wall memorial. He and OCC are determined to create a veterans tribute 1970s digger-style bike worthy of history. Junior is hired by C.F. Martin & Co. Guitars to design a musically-inspired massive reverse trike, an undertaking that pushes his team to their limits. In addition, Junior is asked to design a limited-edition PJD acoustic guitar. Later, Senior and Junior place all the chrome finishings on the Buick.
167	6	"Strikes and Reverse Trikes"	March 19, 2019	0.82	177
Senior buys back the Spider bike, the first theme bike Junior built while at OCC. He surprises Paulie by giving it back to him to pass it down to his son. Senior is hired by Sahlen's Meat Packing Co. to commission a 1930s vintage-style bike for their 150-year anniversary. Meanwhile, PJD completes the complicated assembly of the C.F. Martin & Co. Guitars reverse trike and lets legendary race car driver Mario Andretti dive it during the unveiling. Later, former MLB players turned analysts Jim Thome and Carlos Peña visit OCC to check out the shop. Also, Junior asks Senior if he would like to build a bike together, but Senior isn't ready yet.
168	7	"On the Chopping Block"	March 26, 2019	0.75	178
OCC builds a low-rider, tail-dragger bike for the Hudson Valley SPCA to raise money for the charity after a fire damaged the building and four dogs perished in the aftermath. Meanwhile, Junior attempts a work truck-inspired dually trike for return client TrüNorth for their new website MyTruckWarranty.com powered by Niece Motorsports to kick off the new NASCAR season. Later, Julian Lennon visits PJD to be reunited with a special Honda monkey bike he rode on with father John Lennon. Also, Senior ponders Junior's idea of building a bike together, but he doesn't want to damage their repaired relationship.
169	8	"Bonkers in Yonkers"	April 2, 2019	N/A	179
Junior attempts his first ever dually trike; Senior and his team struggle to build two bikes in three weeks; the Teutuls cruise the Buick through Senior's old stomping grounds.

== Specials ==
=== Original ===
No. overall	No. in season	Title	Original release date
S–01	8	"Daytona Bike Week"	June 2, 2003
A look into the Teutuls at Daytona Bike Week.
S–02	17	"Mikey Special"	November 3, 2003
Mikey takes a look back into some of the memorable moments of the show so far.
S–03	20	"OCC Holiday Special 1 (Santa Bike)"	December 22, 2003
The OCC crew get some holiday cheer and decide to make a bike dedicated to Christmas.
S–04	44	"OCC Holiday Special 2 (Sleigh Bike)"	December 20, 2004
The OCC crew decide that for Christmas this year they will make a sleigh to attach to last years Santa bike, after its creation the whole family gets out giving away presents to disadvantaged families.
S–05	49	""The Best of American Chopper: Sr. vs. Jr."	February 28, 2005
Paul Sr. and Jr. host a series of clips from the show.
S–06	56	"The Best of American Chopper: Michael Teutul as himself"	May 2, 2005
Mikey host clips and bloopers from the show.
S–07	69	"History of the OCC"	November 14, 2005
A look into the history of how OCC came about and the Teutuls rise to stardom.
S–08	70	"Behind the Scenes Special"	November 21, 2005
Mikey hosts a behind the scenes look at "American Chopper."
S–09	71	"Make-A-Wish Bike"	December 19, 2005
The OCC crew create a bike inspired by the children of the Make-A-Wish Foundation.
S–10	76	"Never Before Seen Special"	February 11, 2006
Mikey and Vinnie host a series of "never before seen" clips from the show.
S–11	79	"American Chopper Special"	March 13, 2006
Mikey and Vinnie attempt to obtain New England lobsters for the guys at OCC.

=== Others ===
Title	Original air date	U.S. viewers (millions)
"American Chopper: Shaq Bike"	December 11, 2014	1.24
After Shaquille O'Neal makes an appearance and asks for a bike, Senior and his team fabricate the biggest bike of their careers. Note: The Shaq Bike was originally contracted in the "Bikes for Everyone!" episode of the Orange County Choppers series on CMT.
"American Chopper: The Last Ride"	August 4, 2020	0.81

== See also ==
- American Chopper: Senior vs. Junior
- List of Orange County Choppers episodes
- Orange County Choppers bikes

== Bibliography ==
- American Chopper episode guide from Discovery.com
- American Chopper episode guide from TV.com
