= Throttle Junkies TV =

- Logo
- Starring: Vincent DiMartino; Cody Connelly; William Kenefick; Jeff Lindaman; Joe Capicotti; Chase Capicotti
- Country of origin: United States
- No. of seasons: 1

Production
- Executive producer: Mark Geier
- Running time: 30 minutes
- Production company: Blackwood Entertainment

Original release
- Network: Resorts & Residence; AMG TV; Untamed Sports TV; Altitude Sports; Bright House Sports Network; Cox Sports; CW West Palm; Time Warner Sports Network (Buffalo/Syracuse); LoneStar Cable Network
- Release: February 14, 2010 – 2010

Throttle Junkies TV is a reality television series. The series centers on three entirely different genres of motorcycle builders. V-Force Customs builds custom choppers and is located in Rock Tavern, NY. RetroSBK builds high-performance motorcycles and is located in Camarillo, CA. 2Xtreem Motorsports builds motocross bikes, located in Riviera Beach, FL.

Throttle Junkies first season premiered on February 14, 2010.

== V-Force Customs ==
Vincent DiMartino and Cody Connelly left Orange County Choppers (of American Chopper fame) to start V-Force Customs in 2007. Cody Connelly was a BOCES student intern.

V-force Customs first build was "V-Force 1", unveiled in Daytona Beach, Florida. Soon after the success of "V-force 1", V-force built a custom chopper for the Tampa Bay Storm Arena League Football team. Vinnie and Cody Connelly announced the build from mid-field at a Storm game at the St. Pete Times Forum in Tampa, FL. The Tampa Bay Storm chopper was unveiled at The Storms' final game of the season on June 21, 2008. The bike is touring the southeast United States with all proceeds going to the Pinellas County Humane Society and The Shriners Hospital for Children in Tampa. Also in June, V-Force Customs had its ribbon cutting and grand opening in Rock Tavern, NY.

== RetroSBK ==
William Kenefick is a motorcycle designer. RetroSBK designs and builds custom and retro-inspired motorcycles. RetroSBK-designed motorcycles are featured in the movie Transformers: Revenge of the Fallen as the three components of Arcee. He is joined with bike builder Jeff Lindaman for the series.
