= List of American Chopper: Senior vs. Junior episodes =

The following is a list of episodes of reality television series American Chopper: Senior vs. Junior, the spin-off of American Chopper. Starting December 13, 2010, the show moved to Discovery Channel. and ended.

== Series overview ==
Even though the American Chopper: Senior vs. Junior spin-off series retained its own season numbering scheme (seasons 1–4), it maintained the American Chopper season numbering continuation (seasons 7–10).

Overall season	Spin-off season	Episodes	Originally aired	
Overall season	Spin-off season	Episodes	Season premiere	Season finale
7	1	18	August 12, 2010	February 7, 2011
8	2	21	April 25, 2011	November 28, 2011
9	3	13	February 13, 2012	May 21, 2012
10	4	15	September 3, 2012	December 17, 2012

== Episodes ==
=== Season 1 (2010–2011) ===
The season one mid-season continuation was preceded by a special episode on November 29, 2010, titled "A Family Divided" where Paul Sr, Paul Jr, and Mikey reflect on how their family got to the dysfunctional state it is today. Certain segments about the family from past episodes are shown and the Teutuls are interviewed. Another special titled "A Crew Divided" premiered on January 3, 2011, where both production crews from Orange County Chopper and Paul Jr. Designs opened up about how they feel on the feuding Teutuls.

No. in series	No. in season	Title	Original release date	U.S. viewers (millions)	Overall episode No.
1	1	"Domani Studios Bike"	August 12, 2010	N/A	1
Paul Teutul Jr. announces that he will be opening his own bike shop named Paul Jr. Designs (PJD), now becoming a competitor of his father, Paul Teutul Sr.
2	2	"Window World Bike"	August 19, 2010	N/A	2
Paul Jr. tries to go after all of Orange County Choppers' (OCC) bike vendors, much to the dislike of Paul Sr.
3	3	"ESAB Bike"	August 26, 2010	N/A	3
Paul Sr. sues Paul Jr. for his 20% ownership of OCC, so the two must go to court. A custom OCC chopper is made for ESAB welding equipment.
4	4	"Meteorite Men Bike"	September 2, 2010	N/A	4
OCC builds a bike for Science Channel's "Meteorite Men". A tragic accident at Paul Jr. Designs prompts Paul Sr. to put aside his differences with his sons and reach out to Paulie and Michael.
5	5	"Paul Jr. Designs (PJD) Bike Part 1"	September 16, 2010	N/A	5
OCC builds a ramp to launch a dummy dressed as Paul Jr. over a creek. Meanwhile, PJD begins fabricating their very first chopper for the shop. Jr. realizes that he needs help in the paint department so he recruits his old friend Nubs to the team.
6	6	"PJD Bike Part 2, Geico Bike Part 1, and FBI Bike"	September 23, 2010	N/A	6
Sr. and the team at OCC are tapped to build a bike for the FBI and the local Newburgh Police department. Meanwhile the guys at PJD are furiously attempting to fabricate both the Geico bike and the PJD bike, now named "Anti-Venom" in time for the bike rally in Sturgis, South Dakota.
7	7	"Lawless Drag Bike Part 1, PJD Bike Part 3, and Geico Bike Part 2"	September 30, 2010	N/A	7
OCC and PJD race to finish their bikes for the annual Sturgis Rally in South Dakota. OCC tests out the Lawless Drag bike on a drag strip for the fastest time on a 1/4 mile track.
8	8	"Lawless Drag Bike Part 2, PJD Bike Part 4, and Geico Bike Part 3"	October 7, 2010	N/A	8
The Teutul's arrive in Sturgis, South Dakota, where the crews from OCC and PJD face off for the first time to see who has built the better bike. Paul Jr. unveils the Geico bike and Anti-Venom bike to an impressed crowd and Paul Sr. doesn't want to check the bikes out.
SP1	Special–1	"A Family Divided"	November 29, 2010	N/A	9
Paul Senior, Paul Junior, and Mikey take a close look at how their family has fallen apart. New interviews from all three explore the events that have led to Paul Senior's estrangement from his sons. With so much bad blood can the Teutuls reconcile?
9	9	"Fallen Heroes Bike and Bling Star Bike Part 1"	December 6, 2010	N/A	10
OCC builds a bike for the National Fallen Heroes Memorial in Washington D.C. while PJD meets with Blingstar to design a racing quad and the build is handed to PJD's youngest member Odie. Paul Jr. sends a wedding invitation to Paul Sr., but he's not sure if he should attend.
10	10	"Chicago Blackhawks Bike Part 1 and Bling Star Bike Part 2"	December 13, 2010	N/A	11
OCC meets with representatives from the Chicago Blackhawks hockey franchise to design a bike to hold their Stanley Cup while the team at PJD continues to build a quad bike for Blingstar. Paul Senior's bullmastiff, Gus has a life-threatening illness and needs a leg amputation.
11	11	"Chicago Blackhawks Bike Part 2 Carolina Carports Bike Part 1"	December 20, 2010	N/A	12
The OCC crew continues building the Blackhawks bike and unveils it at the United Center in Chicago. Paul Jr. meets with representavies from Carolina Carports to design an original chopper. Gus is fitted for "pet wheels" and Paul Sr. sends over an impersonator of himself to play a prank on Paulie. Rick is told that he isn't allowed to come over to PJD because of legal issues.
12	12	"Hair Club For Men Bike Part 1 and Carolina Carports Bike Part 2"	December 27, 2010	N/A	13
OCC starts fabricating a bike for Hair Club For Men. PJD continues designing the Carolina Carports chopper and is ready to unveil it at the local "Leaf Festival" in North Carolina, where 400,000 people are there to support PJD and give Paul Jr. a key to the city. Paul Sr. agrees to Mikey's terms on seeing a therapist.
SP2	Special–2	"A Crew Divided"	January 3, 2011	N/A	14
The production crews shooting footage for Orange County Chopper and Paul Jr. Designs discuss how they feel about filming all the drama of the feuding Teutul family throughout the season.
13	13	"Invitation Accepted"	January 17, 2011	N/A	15
A longtime OCC client, FARO Technologies chooses PJD for a bike build, leading to speculation within OCC that Joe violated his non-compete contract. Paul Teutul Sr. and Paul Teutul Jr. are invited to Jason Pohl's wedding, frustrating Mikey because his father didn't attend Junior's wedding. Junior and Mikey are interviewed by Iron Horse Magazine to offer a rebuttal to Senior's earlier interview. OCC unveils the Hair Club bike in Washington.
14	14	"Lee Returns"	January 24, 2011	N/A	16
Lee Stamper agrees to help Paul Sr. mend his fence for business advice and they also discuss Senior's relationship with his sons. Senior and his lawyers bring a second lawsuit against PJD and worker Joe P. Senior and Jason spars with MMA fighter Phil Davis while OCC designs a bike for Headrush MMA apparel and later unveils the Headrush bike in New York City. PJD unveils the FARO bike in Florida and receives the first FARO Edge prototype measurement arm.
15	15	"Foreclosure"	January 31, 2011	3.16	17
OCC makes front page headlines when rumors spread of its foreclosure as it builds a bike for St. Jude Hospital. PJD designs two bikes for a new client, Universal Property Insurance.
16	16	"Fired"	February 7, 2011	3.47	18
Tensions are high at PJD as Odie continues his back talking to Paul Jr. In return, Junior has had enough and fires him. Odie then turns to Senior for counsel, and hopefully, his job back. PJD pulls off a double-unveil for Universal Property Insurance while OCC unveils the "Flex 4" razor bike to an enthusiastic crowd at Bic.

=== Season 2 (2011) ===
On February 7, 2011, Paul Teutul Jr. announced that American Chopper: Senior vs. Junior had been renewed for a second season.

No. in series	No. in season	Title	Original release date	U.S. viewers (millions)	Overall episode No.
17	1	"Mikey's Art Opening"	April 25, 2011	N/A	19
Mikey opens an art gallery to display his paintings and has a successful gallery opening. Paul Jr. meets with his lawyer, and starts fabrication on a military-theme bike for Jared Allen--defensive end for the Minnesota Vikings--charity, Homes For Wounded Warriors. Meanwhile, Paul Sr. builds a bike for Supernatural Cymbals, incorporating bronze into the theme, and has the OCC band play for the unveiling.
18	2	"Big Guns"	May 2, 2011	N/A	20
Senior reconciles with his middle son Danny, and has hopes about making amends with Junior and Mikey. OCC works on a custom bike for longtime client, Alan Brownfeld of Brownfeld Auto Service called the "Money Bike". Paulie and Mikey travel to Baton Rouge, Louisiana and meet up with master gunsmith Will Hayden of Red Jacket Firearms to help with design ideas on his "Dragon Gun", a custom .308 caliber weapon designed to look like the handlebars of a motorcycle. When they get back, Paulie and Vinny put the finishing touches on the Homes For Wounded Warriors bike for the unveiling at the Civic Center. Note: Coincides with the Sons of Guns episode "American Chopper Gun".
19	3	"Judgement Day"	May 9, 2011	2.52	21
Junior receives the good news that he's won his appeal regarding the lawsuit, however, Senior is advised to make a settlement offer to him in order to buy his shares. PJD gets a new project to work on two bikes for CrankyApe, an online motorcycle and ATV retailer, for their upcoming 10th anniversary: one a custom theme bike, and one a stock bike for Mikey to bid on, win the auction, and customize it for re-auction for charity. OCC gets a big project also when they visit Trans Am Depot in Tallahassee, Florida, and has to design three concept bikes for three muscle cars they're re-designing: 7T7 Trans Am Bike, 6T9 GTO "The Goat" Bike, and 6T9 Trans Am Bike. Senior visits Mikey's Wolf Gang Gallery to view his paintings, but he's not there, making Paulie and Mikey question his motive.
20	4	"Offer Denied"	May 16, 2011	N/A	22
Senior's settlement offer gets denied by Junior and his lawyer who then make a counter offer. PJD works as fast as they can to complete the two custom choppers for CrankyApe in time for Daytona Bike Week. OCC finishes their three bikes for Trans Am Depot and unveils them in Boston. Meanwhile, Senior's dog and long-time companion, Gus, dies of cancer and Junior reaches out to his father with a heart-felt condolence.
21	5	"Deadliest Catch Bike"	May 23, 2011	N/A	23
OCC heads to Alaska to meet with the Hillstrand brothers from Deadliest Catch to design a memorial custom chopper for Captain Phil Harris and all the fishermen lost at sea. While there, the crew partake in dog sledding, ice climbing, and goes out crab fishing on the Time Bandit, then has only one week to finish the bike and unveil it in Seattle.
22	6	"Cadillac Build-Off Part 1"	May 30, 2011	N/A	24
GM/Cadillac challenges Paul Sr. and Paul Jr. to go head-to-head in a father-son biker build-off. They are both asked to build their own version of a Cadillac CTS-V-themed bike which will be auctioned off for Cure Duchenne. Senior contacts Junior with another settlement offer, however this time it is without the involvement of his lawyers.
23	7	"Cadillac Build-Off Part 2"	June 6, 2011	N/A	25
The competition heats up when OCC and PJD rush to finish their Cadillac bikes on time. Both companies challenge each other to race CTS-V's at the Monticello Motor Club to see which team has the fastest track time. Then its off to Warren, Michigan, to unveil the Cadillac bikes in front of a large crowd of supporters. Senior chose a traditional classic but technical bobber bike, while Junior designed an "emotional expression", a chopper with smooth lines, airbags that lower and raise the bike with no kick stand, and actual parts from a CTS-V.
24	8	"The Settlement"	August 29, 2011	N/A	26
Senior and Junior finally sit down to settle the two-year lawsuit that has torn their family apart. Despite Junior demanding the Black Widow (the first bike he built at OCC) included in the deal, Senior wishes his son well and tells him he looks forward to some "healthy competition". Amidst the drama, PJD starts the build on a chopper for FIST Technologies (Fingerprint Identification System Technology) that incorporates their biometric anti-theft device, while OCC builds a rock and roll inspired bike for Hard Rock on Wheels for their 40th anniversary. Meanwhile, Senior has to look for another place of business after the foreclosure of the OCC dealership.
25	9	"Return of the Black Widow"	September 5, 2011	2.7	27
Junior and Vinnie venture into "enemy territory" that is the OCC dealership to pick up the Black Widow Bike, and Senior expresses his frustration that he hasn't seen Mikey post-settlement like he promised. PJD finishes the FIST Bike and unveils it to a big crowd at Sun Fest in West Palm Beach, Florida. OCC creates a lightning-themed bike for Power Probe: The Ultimate Circuit Tester which features a battery tester starter and a lightning bolt exhaust pipe. Junior gives an opportunity to Peter, his young hard-working new shop employee to learn how to build bikes.
26	10	"Downsizing"	September 12, 2011	N/A	28
PJD heads to Epic Games in Cary, North Carolina to design an over-the-top trike bike with a new push-pull rear steering system representing their video game, Gears of War 3 while the OCC crew builds a custom chopper for Feather Free Zone: Your Solution To Bird Pollution, (No Fly Zone), a merging of two bird removal companies and unveils it at Jenkinson's Boardwalk in Point Pleasant Beach, New Jersey. Meanwhile, with the OCC headquarters in foreclosure, Senior decides to build a new shop at the front of his property. Also Rick is reaching his breaking point with Senior's constant insults at work.
27	11	"Gears of War"	September 19, 2011	N/A	29
OCC begins a build for Wyotech, a trade school in Daytona Beach, Florida, for budding automobile and motorcycle mechanics, while PJD continues work on the Gears of War 3 trike and unveils it at ComicCon in San Diego. Meanwhile, Junior realizes his company is understaffed when they have to race to meet deadline while Rick Petko contemplates quitting OCC and working for PJD.
28	12	"Senior Reaches Out"	September 26, 2011	N/A	30
Senior tries to commission a painting from Mikey, but gets mixed signals from his son post-settlement. OCC starts a build for Beck's Hybrids, a family-owned hybrid-seed company from Atlanta, Indiana that wants to build a reverse trike and a chopper for their 75th anniversary, while PJD works on a clinical modern design for Cepheid, a medical diagnostics company for their new product the GeneXpert.
29	13	"Mikey's Decision"	October 3, 2011	N/A	31
Deciding he'd like to commission a painting, Senior continues to reach out to Mikey, who seeks counseling from Vinnie. In Atlanta, PJD reveals the bike for Cepheid, a medical technology company, to an impressed crowd, while in Indianapolis, OCC unveils the all-custom reverse trike for Beck's Hybrids as well as a bike to be used to raise money for the We Care for Orphans charity.
SP3	Special–1	"Top 10 Fights"	October 3, 2011	N/A	32
In this special episode, doors fly from hinges and windows are shattered as cast members recount the most heated moments over the past few years. The most memorable fights between father, sons and co-workers that often begin with business but get personal.
SP4	Special–2	"Mikey's Favorite Moments"	October 10, 2011	N/A	33
Mikey recalls his favorite American Chopper memories; both good and bad. From PJD's first big bike unveil in Sturgis, South Dakota, to bow fishing in Louisiana. He relives the scary encounter between Junior and a lion while on safari in South Africa, as well as some touching family moments.
30	14	"Silent Treatment"	October 17, 2011	N/A	34
PJD works on a board tracker-style bike for Dekalb, a hybrid corn seed company in Mystic, Connecticut, for their 100-year anniversary while OCC builds a charity bike for Cell Buckle, a company that makes mobile phone holders to be unveiled at Sturgis. Also, the harmony is disrupted at OCC when Jason is offended by Senior's critique of his generic design, resulting in his melt-down that leaves a mangled bike which has to be rebuilt.
31	15	"Communication Breakdown"	October 24, 2011	N/A	35
OCC works on a custom chopper for US Biker Law.com for their motorcycle injury division and to memorialize the 10th anniversary of 9/11, while PJD unveils their 1912 throwback ethanol bike for Dekalb at the Farm Progress Show in Decatur, Illinois. Meanwhile, Mikey and Senior both want to get together to talk, but they can't decide on the conditions under which they will meet.
SP5	Special–3	"Top 10 Bikes"	October 31, 2011	N/A	36
Senior and Junior reveal their top ten favorite bikes they have ever built over the years. Senior's favorites: Christopher & Dana Reeve Foundation Bike, Yankee Bike, Make-A-Wish Bike, St. Jude Bike, Senior's Vintage Bike, Junior's Dream Bike (green spiderweb design), Jet Bike, David Mann Bike, Eragon Bike, and POW/MIA Bike. Junior's favorites: Geico Bike, NY Giants Bike, Comanche Bike, Liberty Bike, Cadillac Bike, Gears of War Bike, Jet Bike, Fire Bike, Anti-Venom Bike, and Black Widow Bike.
32	16	"Free Rick"	November 14, 2011	N/A	37
Senior secures a build for a wealthy foreigner from Saudi Arabia who wants a custom bike to match his Arabian horses. Meanwhile, Junior lands the biggest build of his career when he is asked by Tishman Construction to build a bike inspired by the restoration of Ground Zero for the 9/11 Memorial in New York City. Also, rumors fly at both shops over Rick's assumed discontent at OCC while Mikey starts the "Free Rick" project and designs a T-shirt for his campaign, giving them away outside the shop.
33	17	"Old Rivals"	November 21, 2011	N/A	38
A three-way bike build-off is announced between Senior, Junior, and customizer Jesse James who throws down the gauntlet by sending vulgar cakes to both OCC and PJD to kick-start their battle in December. Senior finishes the Arabian Horse Bike and starts build on a custom bike for Grainger while Junior unveils the 9/11 Memorial bike for the New World Trade Center project at NYC's Ground Zero in front of mayor Michael Bloomberg.
SP6	Special–4	"Best Pranks"	November 28, 2011	N/A	39
Senior, Junior, and Mikey recall their funniest jokes and best pranks played on themselves and the crew at their time working together at OCC. Pranks included are "scooter jousting", Vinny slinging spitballs at Junior, waking up Mikey with an airhorn, Karl the exploding dummy, setting off fireworks, hanging the losing build-off bike from the ceiling, sabotaging Senior's production bike during an unveiling, the 1.5 volt shock pen, ambushing the senior's office using air rifles, the Silver State bike drop unveil from a helicopter, the Senior impersonator visits PJD, Mikey's horn magic trick, and OCC's first prank, the accident; Junior crashing into Senior's truck in the parking lot.

=== Season 3 (2012) ===
No. in series	No. in season	Title	Original release date	U.S. viewers (millions)	Overall episode No.
34	1	"Winners and Losers"	February 13, 2012	N/A	40
In the aftermath Chopper Live, Junior celebrates his victory and fulfills a custom chopper order for an overseas client from Poland for his charity foundation. Meanwhile, Senior puts his focus towards the future when he starts a big build for Donald Trump and pursues an even bigger opportunity to be on Celebrity Apprentice, however he receives some news of death in his family. Also OCC finishes the Grainger tool bike and unveils it in front of the entire company in Lake Forest, Illinois.
35	2	"The Apprentice Bike"	February 20, 2012	N/A	41
Senior feels abandoned by Junior and Mikey as he deals with the loss of his step mother, Helen. OCC unveils the Trump royalty bike at Trump Tower in New York City. Meanwhile, PJD begins a build for One Call Concepts (OCC Inc.), a company that provides safe solutions in helping people across the country with damage prevention when digging underground and tries to integrate their "call 811 before you dig" campaign into their bike.
36	3	"Operation Reconciliation"	February 27, 2012	N/A	42
PJD finishes the One Call Concepts "811" bike and unveils it in Ocean City, Maryland, while OCC works on a bike for Veterans Airlift Command (VAC), a charity service that provides free air transport to wounded veterans and their families. When the "Purple Heart" bike is finished, OCC travels to Pinehurst, North Carolina, on Veterans Day to unveil it in front of the organization and their sponsor, Window World, Inc. who auctions it off. Following Helen's death and realizing life's too short, Senior feels compelled to reconcile with his sons, starting with a phone call to Mikey and invites him to a painting session with veterans at his house. But Mikey plans a charitable weight loss competition with the mayor of Montgomery.
37	4	"Rick's News"	March 5, 2012	N/A	43
After 10 years in storage at OCC, Junior decides to makeover the Black Widow bike he reclaimed from Senior during their settlement and makes his mark on it with his PJD logo. Meanwhile, OCC works on two bikes for John Christner Trucking (JCT) for their 25th year anniversary; one bike is an old school bobber-style look and the other is a modern chopper. Rick announces news that he's engaged and plans to invite both Senior and Junior to the wedding. Mikey hires a personal motivator/life coach to help him lose weight to raise money for his charity to help a 4-year-old local boy with leukemia.
38	5	"The Call"	March 12, 2012	N/A	44
OCC completes the two bikes for John Christner Trucking and unveils them as a surprise to the owner at his corporate office in Tulsa, Oklahoma. Meanwhile, PJD begins a charity build for the owner of Lamar Construction Company who has a special connection to the March of Dimes and wants to raffle off the bike. Mikey and the town mayor achieve their goal of losing weight for leukemia and raises money to help pay the child's medical bills. Also, after months of silence, Junior reaches out to Senior by calling him to give his condolences on Helen's passing, leading his father to visit him at home to talk in person and reconcile.
39	6	"Drastic Step"	March 19, 2012	N/A	45
Feeling even more charitable, Mikey launches a fundraising campaign for the March of Dimes by getting donations out on the street while PJD unveils the Lamar Construction/March of Dimes bike in Hudsonville, Michigan. OCC heads to the E-Biofuels headquarters in West Middletown, Indiana, to begin an eco-friendly build for CIMA Green and creates two street-legal motorcycles using special bio diesel motors. One is to be donated to the National Biodisel Board and the other the company keeps as a show bike. Meanwhile, Senior makes bold moves in his effort to reconcile with his sons by paying a visit to Pauly's house and Mikey's art gallery, however, both are out of town.
40	7	"Breakthrough"	April 9, 2012	N/A	46
After receiving a puzzling text from Mikey asking to be left alone, Senior calls Junior to make amends with at least one son. PJD starts a build for Nevada's Newmont Mining Corp. and wants to incorporate an ounce of gold splatter into the bike while OCC unveils their two bio-diesel bikes for CIMA Green at the National Biodiesel Conference & Expo in Orlando, Florida. Then, Junior call Senior and asks for a face-to-face meeting...without cameras.
41	8	"A Meeting Is Set"	April 16, 2012	N/A	47
OCC starts an early 1970s-themed chopper for MyPillow while PJD puts the finishing touches on the Newmont Mining bike and later unveils it in front of a large crowd outside the Red Lion Hotel & Casino in Elko, Nevada. Meanwhile, Rick meets with Vinnie for lunch to ask him if he knows anything about Mikey's cryptic text to his father. Also, there is promise that all the family drama could finally end as Senior and Junior agree to meet in person at Junior's house minus cameras.
42	9	"No Cameras"	April 23, 2012	N/A	48
Junior and Senior ditch the cameras and finally meet face-to-face to discuss their future relationship as father and son. Meanwhile, OCC finishes a 1970s retro stretched-out chopper for MyPillow and unveils it at the Mall of America in Bloomington, Minnesota. While PJD starts their first customer bike for Major League Baseball player Aaron Rowand, outfielder for the Miami Marlins.
43	10	"Mikey Out?"	April 30, 2012	N/A	49
OCC starts a build that will be unveiled to the prime minister of Malaysia, Najib Razak to help promote tourism in Malaysia. While PJD finishes the Black Widow inspired Aaron Rowand bike unveiling it in front of the shop with the collection of custom bikes. Meanwhile, Mikey drops an unexpected bomb to Vinny and Rick when he considers quitting the show after eight seasons because he thinks he can have a relationship with his father again.
44	11	"Malaysian Adventure"	May 7, 2012	N/A	50
The OCC crew; Senior, Jason, Jim and Steve travel to Malaysia, where they not only unveil the One Malaysia bike to the prime minister, Dato Sri Mohd Najib at the Putra World Trade Center in Kuala Lumpur as part of the "Five Mountain Motorcycle Tour Package", but get to know the country's hotspots on Langkawi Island. They encounter the wildlife, swim under the Seven Wells Waterfall, take a boat tour through the Mangrove forest, explore a bat cave, ride in a cable car, barter at the historic Central Market and visit the Petronas Towers. Meanwhile, Mikey finally tells Paulie that he may be quitting the show and asks for his advice, wondering if it's the right thing to do.
45	12	"Change of Heart Part 1"	May 14, 2012	N/A	51
PJD starts build on a classic chopper for Skil Power Tools for their 75th year anniversary of the "Skilsaw Worm Drive 77", which dates back to 1937. Meanwhile, OCC begins a bike based on an Italian sports car for a high profile private client. Then Junior makes a huge decision that could finally end his estrangement from his father for good. Also, Pauly pays Mikey a visit at his art gallery and learns his brother is 100 percent positive that he's quitting the show and wishes him well.
46	13	"Change of Heart Part 2"	May 21, 2012	N/A	52
OCC finishes the Italian sports car bike while PJD unveils the Skil Bike at the Hard Rock Casino in Las Vegas. Meanwhile, Mikey leaves the show once and for all, and says his goodbyes to the PJD crew. Also, Junior goes to OCC to confront Senior face-to-face and sees his father's apology as a starting point to build a relationship again. While Senior sees the meeting as an opportunity to bond with his son again and suggests to build a bike together for a charity of their choosing. However, Pauly hasn't given Senior his final answer...yet.

=== Season 4 (2012) ===
Note: This season dropped the Sr. vs. Jr. subtitle and returned to the original American Chopper title.

No. in series	No. in season	Title	Original release date	U.S. viewers (millions)	Overall episode No.
47	1	"The Build is On"	September 3, 2012	N/A	53
In the season premiere, Senior proposes that he and Junior collaborate to build a bike for charity. Being both invited to Rick's wedding, Senior and Junior are brought back together again. Meanwhile, OCC plans a bike for the grand opening of the new OCC Cafe at their world headquarters. And PJD returns to GEICO to start a build an armed forces tribute bike for their military division.
48	2	"Back in Time"	September 10, 2012	N/A	54
Senior and Junior decide to recreate the first bike they ever built together in their old steel shop and basement before Orange County Choppers 14 years ago. Meanwhile, Senior is surprised he received a "happy birthday" text from Mikey for his 63rd birthday. PJD unveils the GEICO Armed Forces tribute bike at the USO Patriotic Festival in Virginia Beach, Virginia, and OCC reveals the OCC Cafe Bike to the staff at OCC Cafe which will be opening soon.
49	3	"Common Ground"	September 17, 2012	N/A	55
Things get a little awkward for Senior and Junior in discussing designs while working on their old school bike build. PJD begins work on a five-wheeled dragster-type "trike" for Loopster, an internet video editing company. OCC builds a bike for Trusted Choice insurance that will be used for one of Senior's favorite charities, Make a Wish Foundation and later unveiled in Alexandria, Virginia.
50	4	"Now or Never"	September 24, 2012	N/A	56
Senior and Junior begin to open up to each other during their retro bike build in Senior's garage. OCC starts a bike for Wildgame Innovations that will be able to hold the company's Barnett crossbow which the guys have fun blowing up stuff with. Meanwhile, PJD unveils the Loopster trike to a large crowd outside Gateway Canyon Resort in Gateway, Colorado.
51	5	"Uncharted Territory"	October 1, 2012	N/A	57
PJD begins fabrication on a bike for technology company QUBX. OCC assembles and unveils Wildgame Innovations bike right in front of their headquarters. Meanwhile, Senior and Junior continue their build on a re-vamped version of an old school bike and collaborate with two painters (Ralph and Nub) for the gastank and fender.
52	6	"Junior's Surprise"	October 8, 2012	N/A	58
OCC starts an old-school build for Paul's upcoming trip to Sturgis in Sturgis, South Dakota, while PJD unveils their high-tech bike for QUBX at Quaker Steak & Lube in Valley View, Ohio. Meanwhile, Junior has a big surprise for Senior when they finish their father-son build. Later, the Teutuls take their new bike for a test ride.
53	7	"New Venture"	October 15, 2012	N/A	59
PJD starts a bike for RoadLoK incorporating their rotor locking system. Senior makes his appearance with Junior on the Late Show and receives a stern, on-air lecture from host David Letterman. Meanwhile Junior launches a new business venture called PJD Studios that offers more to their clients (FX, animation, logo design and branding). Senior pays a visit to PJD for the first time. At Sturgis, Senior rides side by side with industry icon Sugar Bear.
54	8	"Full Circle"	October 22, 2012	N/A	60
Junior visits OCC to brainstorm with Senior about potential future collaborations, including creating a line of production bikes between the two companies, who meet together for the first time since the breakup. Meanwhile, OCC starts a high-performance sports bike build they call "Super Bike" for a private client while PJD finishes the RoadLoK bike and unveils it at the Sturgis Motorcycle Rally.
55	9	"A New Company"	October 29, 2012	N/A	61
Senior and Junior begin brainstorming on their production bike company but, when they don't see eye-to-eye, the road is rocky from the get-go, leading Senior to jump the gun on the bike's design. PJD starts an unusual build for Cre8Play, a company based out of Minneapolis that designs and builds custom themed playgrounds. They agree to collaborate on an interactive PJD-themed playground that's based on their three most popular bikes (Anti-Venom, Black Widow and the Build-off P-51 Mustang bike). Meanwhile, OCC struggles to complete the Super Bike leading to more days of fabrication.
56	10	"Junior Frustration"	November 5, 2012	N/A	62
Senior makes business decisions without his son's approval. Junior then gets frustrated when he receives a call from Jason to discuss design aspects for the production bike when it was agreed that PJD would handle the fabrication. Meanwhile, OCC unveils the Super Bike to their client and restaurant partner at the OCC Cafe and later starts an old school bike for Big Ass Fans. PJD and Cre8Play complete the Black Widow, Anti-Vrenon and build-off bike-inspired playground and unveils it at the Anaheim Convention Center in Anaheim, California.
57	11	"Old Wounds"	November 12, 2012	N/A	63
Senior throws down the gauntlet for a biker build-off rematch when he calls the show's producer Craig Pilgrim who adds a new player (the Fast N' Loud guys) to the competition. PJD collaborates with bicycle company Dynacraft to design bicycle versions of the "Black Widow", "Anti-Venom" and P-51 Mustang bikes. OCC runs into a problem with the Big Ass Fans bike before the unveiling in Kentucky. Meanwhile, tensions rise at OCC when Junior and Senior disagree on the production bike's design process when they're not on the same page choosing a frame.
58	12	"Troubled Waters"	November 19, 2012	N/A	64
The production bike's progress grinds to a halt when Senior and Junior disagree on a plan of action. PJD gets a call that their 911/Memorial bike is under 4-feet of water from Hurricane Sandy and they try to salvage what they can to rebuild it. Senior confronts Vinnie about their past differences. OCC unveils the Big Ass Fans bike at their R&D test facility in Lexington, Kentucky, and then starts a three-bike build for The Venetian in Las Vegas. Meanwhile, PJD partners with Bioworld to design t-shirts of their most popular bikes to sell in retail stores.
59	13	"Impasse"	November 26, 2012	N/A	65
Senior pulls a prank for the biker build-off by creating a riveted used car for Junior and having the OCC crew deliver it to his shop. PJD works even harder to restore the 9/11 Memorial Bike. OCC finishes the first Venetian bike and starts fabrication on the second and third bikes. Then they start a new build for GAF Roofing after the guys "test" their Timberline shingles product. Meanwhile, the production bike discussions open old wounds when Pauly meets with his father in Jason's office causing things to get heated between Junior and Jason over their individual design processes.
60	14	"The Last Build"	December 3, 2012	N/A	66
OCC completes the GAF Roofing Bike and delivers one of the three Venetian bikes to the hotel in Las Vegas. PJD finishes the 9/11 Memorial Bike restoration. They also visit Staten Island, which was hit by Hurricane Sandy, to distribute food and supplies with Governor Cuomo. Vinnie and Cody come up with a new prank that uses the car OCC previously sent to them. Senior and Junior meet for lunch and find common ground when they reminisce about their lives at the time when the show first started. Both come to a realization that rebuilding their personal relationship is more important than being in business together, leading to a mutual decision to end work on the production bike.
61	15	"The End"	December 17, 2012	2.00	67
In this final episode of the series, Mikey reunites with his father and sits down with his brother as the three look back on a decade of memories. Meanwhile, both OCC and PJD crews reminisce about their time on the show. Also, Senior and Junior donate their father-son build "Teutul" bike to Motorcyclepedia, a motorcycle museum in Newburgh, New York.

== Specials ==
Title	Original air date	U.S. viewers (millions)
"The Build-Off Part 1"	December 5, 2011	N/A
The three-way bike build-off begins in this episode. OCC builds a flamethrowing snowmobile, Jesse James shows off his blacksmithing while building an old school chopper, and PJD builds a P51 Mustang-inspired show bike.
"The Build-Off Part 2"	December 6, 2011	4.77
The conclusion of the three-way custom bike build-off between Senior, Junior, and Jesse James is continued live at the Hard Rock Hotel in Las Vegas. The fans decided the winner online: Junior's P-51 Mustang-themed bike.
"PJD Muscle Car"	March 26, 2012	N/A
For the first time ever Junior takes his company in an entirely new direction when PJD goes outside the realm of motorcycles and teams up with TAM (Trans American Muscle) to incorporate design features from the P-51 Mustang "build-off" bike into a modern day muscle car; the new Chevy Camaro, which will be in a limited run series. The new custom muscle car kit and super charger is then unveiled to a packed house at the International Motorcycle Show during Daytona Bike Week in Daytona, Florida.
"American Chopper Live: The Road to Revenge"	December 10, 2012	2.52
Follow the four teams as they build a bike for the four-way build-off.
"American Chopper Live: The Revenge"	December 11, 2012	3.91
The winner of the build-off is revealed.
"Countdown to the End"	December 17, 2012	N/A
How the father and son team began.
"The Last Ride"	June 9, 2020	N/A
After hearing about demolition plans for the old Orange County Choppers building, Junior asks his dad to build one last bike together in the old shop.

== See also ==
- List of Orange County Choppers episodes
