= Jason Pohl =

American motorcycle builder (born 1981)

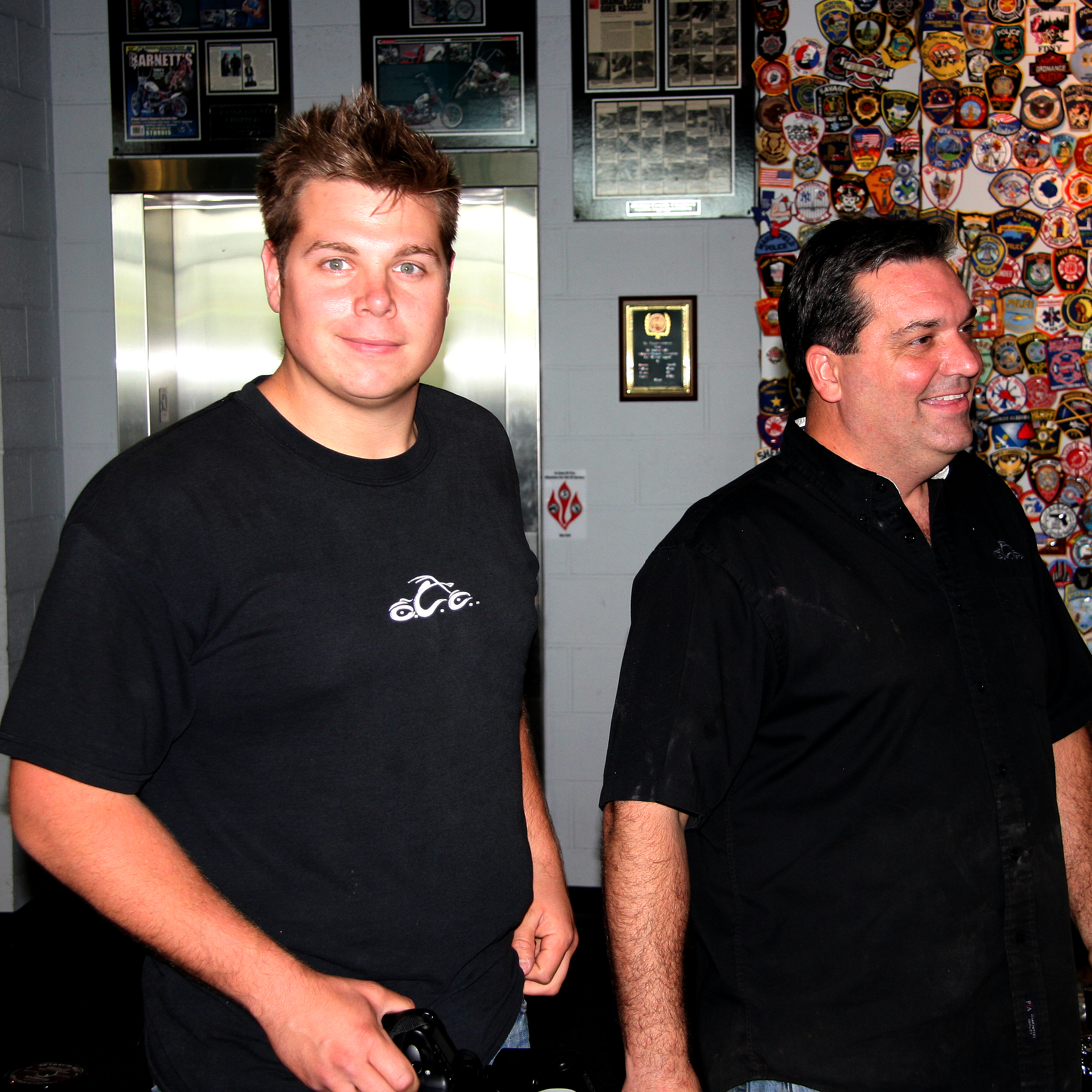
- Pohl (left) with co-worker Jim Quinn
- Born: July 1, 1981 (age 44); Mendota, Illinois, U.S.
- Occupation: Motorcycle Designer

Jason Pohl (born July 1, 1981) is a chopper designer who works at Orange County Choppers. He is most commonly known for his workplace being the subject of the American TV series American Chopper.

== History ==
Pohl's initial plan was to join the U.S. Marine Corps after finishing high school, however, he was awarded the August Holland Scholarship and decided to attend the Illinois Institute of Art, where he earned a bachelor's degree in Fine Arts.

== Career ==
Pohl joined Orange County Choppers as Senior Designer in early 2004. He started his career at Incredible Technologies, based in Arlington Heights, IL as an Artist/Animator of videogames, where he worked on a digital pinball prototype licensed by OCC and was responsible for the modelling and designing of all choppers featured in the game. Upon completion of the project, Paul Teutul Sr. was so impressed with his work, he approached Pohl to join the team. Since joining OCC, Pohl finds the most challenging part of his job to be taking two dimensional conceptual drawings and modelling and reshaping them into fully functional three dimensional parts.
