= List of Orange County Choppers episodes =

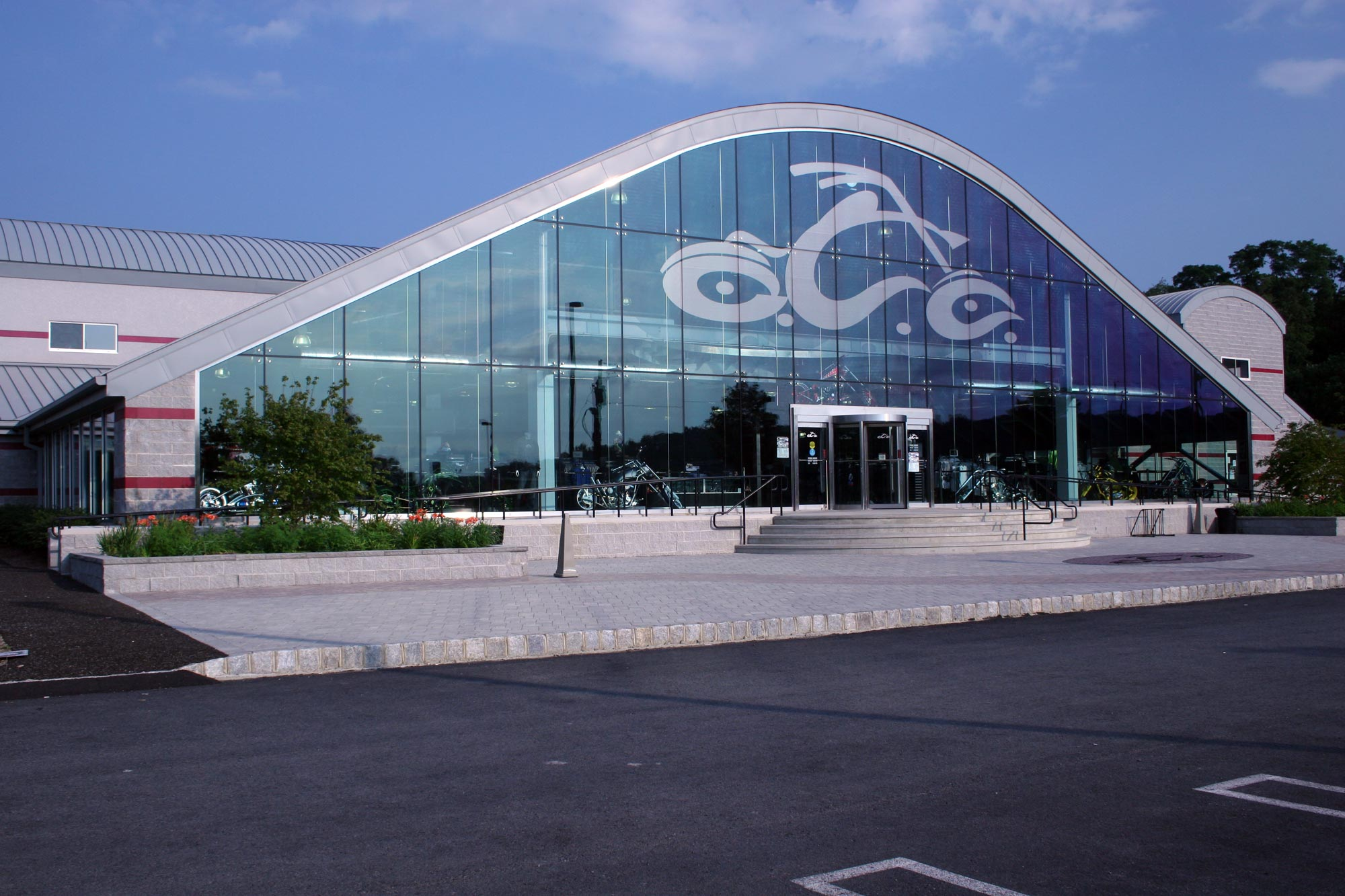
The Orange County Choppers headquarters building where most of the bike fabrication was filmed.

Orange County Choppers is an American reality television series, an American Chopper spin-off, and produced by Pilgrim Studios. The program chronicles Paul Teutul Sr. ("Senior") and his Orange County Choppers (OCC) team as they design and fabricate some of the most complicated builds of their careers. Evan Favaro is hired as Creative Director and proves his leadership and bike-building skills.

The one-season, eight-episode Orange County Choppers series originally aired on CMT between August 18, 2013 and January 11, 2014 as the successor to the American Chopper: Senior vs. Junior series (2010-2012). On August 18, 2013, a two-hour "special" titled "Orange County Choppers: Sneak Peek" appeared on CMT as an introduction to the series. The first episode, "The Goody's Popcorn Bike", was shown three months later on November 16, 2013. The spin-off's one and only season concluded with "Bikes for Everyone" on January 11, 2014.

== Crew members ==
- Paul Teutul Sr. – Owner
- Steve Moreau – Executive Vice President & Chief Operating Officer
- Ron Salsbury – Operations Manager
- Jason Pohl – Lead Industrial Designer & Artist
- Jim Quinn – Lead Engineer & Machinist
- Evan Favaro – Creative Director & Fabricator
- Christian Welter – Mechanic/Fabricator
- Rick Petko – Mechanic/Fabricator
- Nicholas Hansford – Mechanic/Fabricator

== Episodes ==
=== Season 1 (2013-2014) ===
No. in season	Title	Original release date	U.S. viewers (millions)
1	"The Goody's Popcorn Bike"	November 16, 2013	N/A
Senior has recently hired Evan Favaro as OCC's creative director. Goody's Popcorn asks Senior and his team to design and build a bike that will be raffled off to raise money for popcorn that will be sent to troops. Evan is in direct charge of leading and fabricating bike builds, but his old-school techniques put the team's nerves on edge. Later, Evan's possible last-minute changes to the bike and other office shenanigans put the build's completion schedule in jeopardy. Evan is placed on probation by being temporarily demoted to fabricator until he learns OCC's fundamental protocols better.
2	"The GAF Sturgis Bike"	November 23, 2013	N/A
GAF Materials Corporation (GAF), North America's largest roofing material manufacturer, commissions OCC to build a bike that will be given to a veteran at the Sturgis Motorcycle Rally in Sturgis, South Dakota. But there's a catch: it has to be designed and built in less than two-and-a-half weeks for the unveiling. Evan pleads and convinces Senior to let him lead the build as creative director, but more rookie mistakes sway the rest of the team to think Evan is not suitable for the role.
3	"The Fill-a-Need Bike"	November 30, 2013	N/A
Fill-a-Need, an organization raising autism awareness, asks Senior and OCC to build them a bike. Rick drops a bombshell, stating that he will be away for most of the build. This places Evan in charge of most of the bike's fabrication. Evan wants to prove his leadership and fabrication skills by sharing his ideas on a new exhaust design to a resistant Senior. Rick comes back to help finalize the build, adding subtle changes to the exhaust pipes. A livid Evan wonders why Rick was allowed to change the exhaust while his ideas were rejected. Senior, Ron, and Steve meet to discuss and agree on Evan's permanent demotion to fabricator, but just hope Evan stays with OCC.
4	"The Ardbeg Trike"	December 7, 2013	N/A
Ardbeg Distillery, a Scottish whiskey company, approaches OCC about building a trike. Evan, being demoted, feels he can step up his game as fabricator without the extra pressures of being creative director. Christian does his own thing on the handlebars which Senior dislikes, making Christian feel undervalued. Rick, the "Senior Whisperer", "teaches" the team members how to make small changes to add to the uniqueness of the builds that pleases all parties, even Senior. Christian soon realizes that he would not trade the team for anything.
5	"The Sonic Bike"	December 14, 2013	N/A
Sonic contacts OCC to build a bike and Jason begins the design process. The end result is to be a mashup of the restaurant's classic roots and modernization of the brand. The mockup goes smoothly, giving the team some time to take part in much needed out-of-the-office recreation. During the final build, there is an issue with the chrome, jeopardizing the schedule. Christian, Rick, and Evan work extra hard to help ensure the completion for the bike reveal in San Diego, California.
6	"The Dragon Bike"	December 28, 2013	N/A
A client from China asks OCC to design and build a bike that represents the Year of the Dragon. A finely detailed dragon adorns the bike's top tube. After a prank goes wrong, a part of the bike is damaged, sending the team into a frenzy to repair the part and finish the build before the client reaches the States for the big reveal.
7	"The GapVax Bike"	January 4, 2014	N/A
GapVax, Inc., a leading manufacturer of industrial vacuum equipment, approaches OCC and Senior to build them a 25th Anniversary bike. Soon after, Jersey Shore's Pauly D also asks OCC to build a bike for a charity that Pauly D supports. The team works to finish both bikes on time. Rick, Christian, and Evan pull the "ultimate prank" on Senior.
8	"Bikes for Everyone!"	January 11, 2014	N/A
Steve shares an idea with Senior that will potentially expand the OCC brand and would allow for customizable, affordable bikes that the public could purchase. Senior is onboard. Jason begins designing a display booth that could be installed in dealerships and other outlets. Meanwhile, Shaquille O'Neal makes an appearance and orders the biggest chopper Senior has ever built.

== Specials ==
Title	Original air date	U.S. viewers (millions)
"Orange County Choppers: Sneak Peak"	August 18, 2013	N/A
An introduction to the series, showcasing the team members and pranks.

== See also ==
- Orange County Choppers bikes
