= Airola (disambiguation) =

Airola may refer to:

- Airola, a comune (municipality) in the province of Benevento in Italy
- Angelica Veronica Airola, Italian Baroque painter
- Jerry Airola, Founder and CEO of Silver State Helicopters
- Oona Airola (born 1988), Finnish actress

== See also ==
- Areola
