= Paul Teutul Sr. =

American TV star and motorcycle builder (born 1949)

Paul Teutul
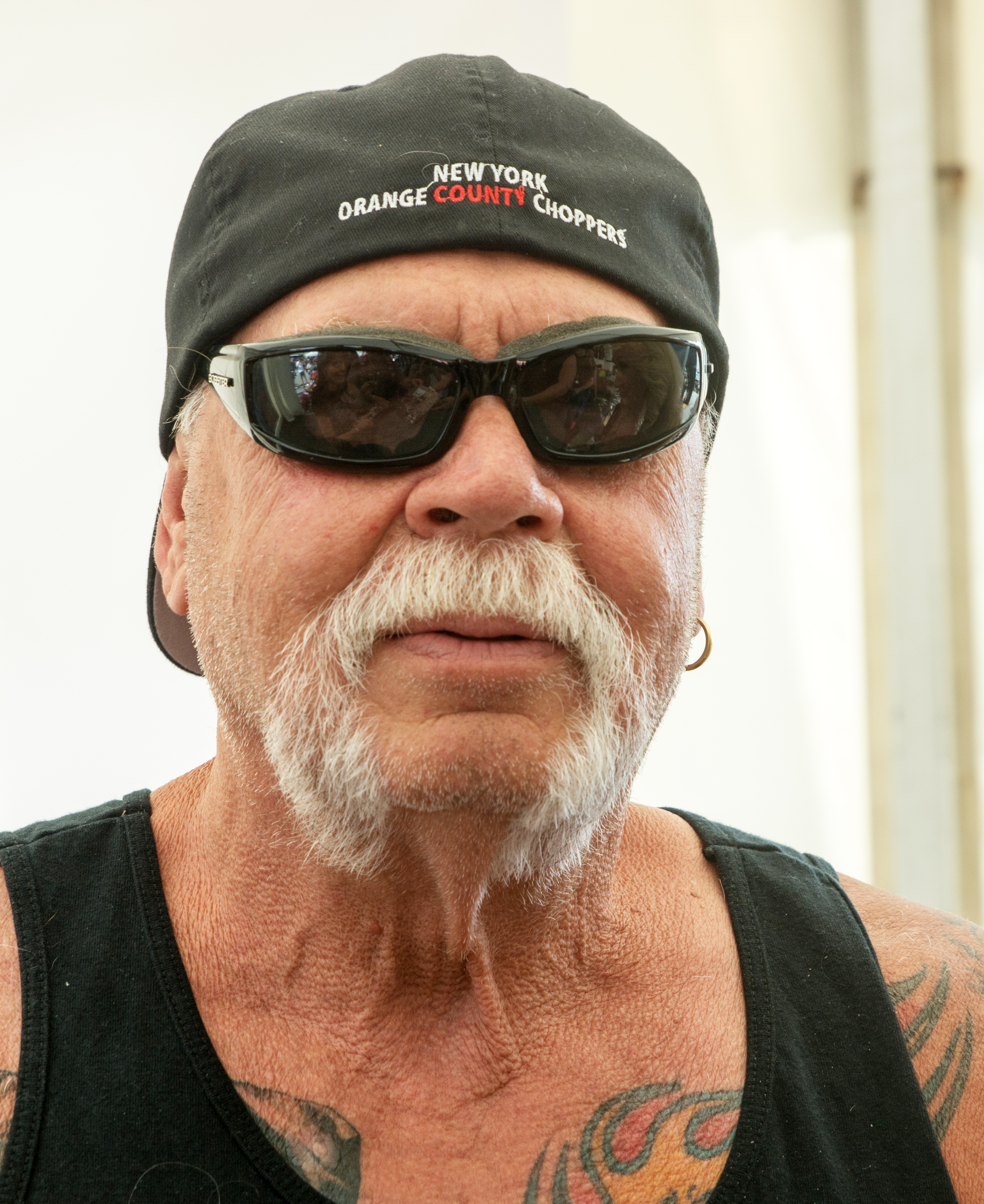
- Teutul in 2016
- Born: Paul John Teutul; May 1, 1949 (age 77); Yonkers, New York, U.S.
- Occupations: Motorcycle designer and builder
- Known for: American Chopper; Orange County Choppers; Founder of Orange County Choppers
- Spouses: Paula Teutul (m. 1969; div. 1995); Beth Dillon (m. 2007; div. 2012)
- Children: 4, including Paul Teutul and Michael
- Military career
- Allegiance: United States
- Branch: United States Merchant Marine
- Conflicts: Vietnam War

Paul John Teutul (/ˈtʌtəl/ TUT-əl; born May 1, 1949) is an American motorcycle designer and the founder of Orange County Choppers, a manufacturer of custom motorcycles and the focus of the reality television series American Chopper. He first appeared on the show with his sons Paul Jr. and Michael. In 2013, his new show Orange County Choppers premiered on CMT.

== Early life ==
Teutul was born in Yonkers, New York and grew up in Pearl River, New York. He enlisted as a member of the United States Merchant Marine during the Vietnam War.

== Career ==
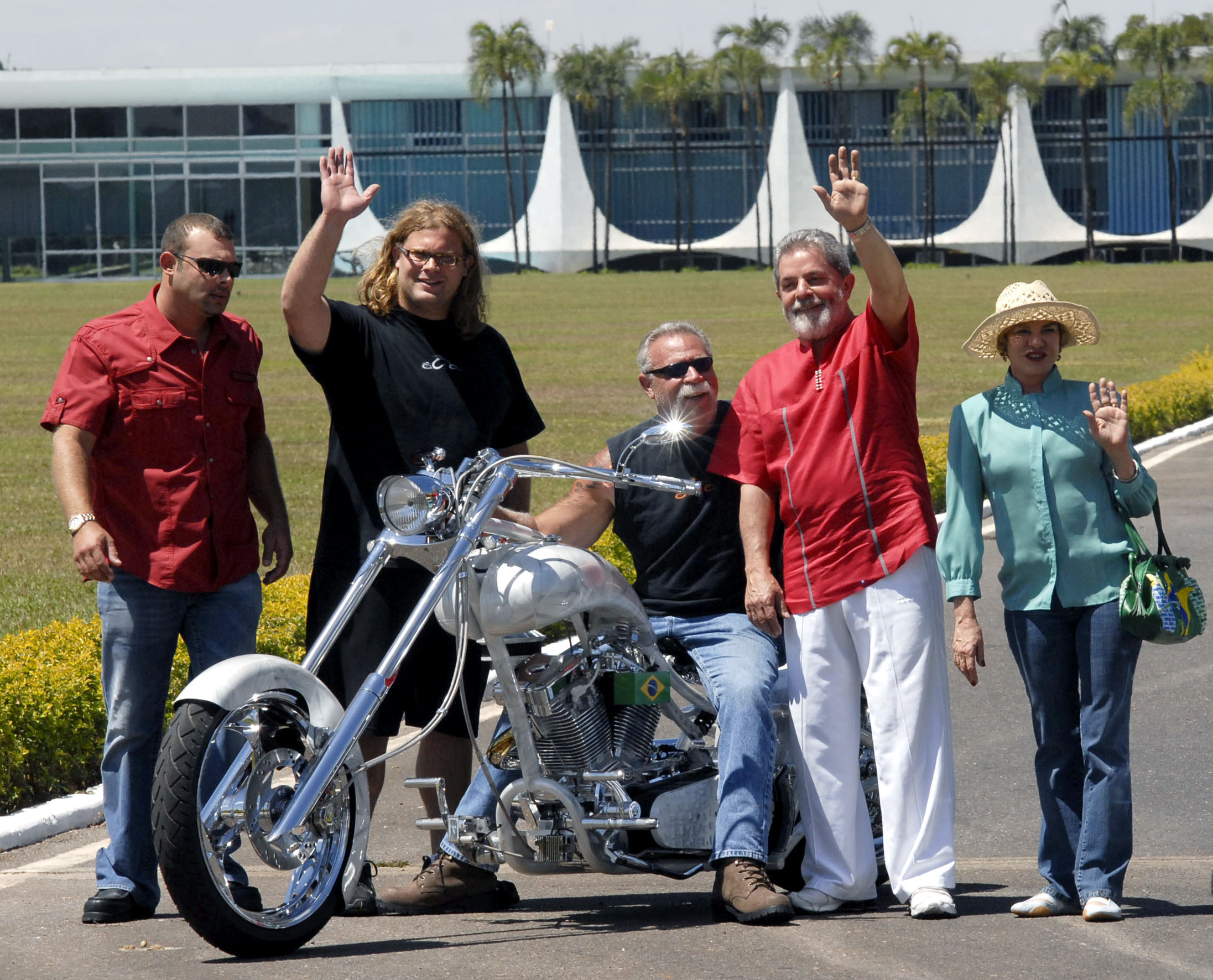
Teutul (sitting) with Brazilian president Luiz Inácio Lula da Silva (second from right) and First Lady Marisa Letícia in front of the Palácio da Alvorada in Brasília, Brazil

Teutul originally began with Orange County Ironworks, a fabrication shop now solely owned and managed by son Daniel Teutul. He began building custom bikes as a hobby after being inspired by the many custom bikes appearing on the streets and in films. In 1999, he left and founded Orange County Choppers. He began building bikes that quickly made their way to magazine covers, and center stage at every major motorcycle event. OCC landed on the hit reality show American Chopper.

== Family ==
In addition to Paul Jr. and Mikey Teutul, Paul Sr. has two other children: Christin Teutul and Daniel 'Dan' Teutul. Dan Teutul took over Orange County Ironworks when his father started building more bikes than buildings. His daughter Christin is a nurse in New York City who works in pediatrics. Paul Sr. has seven grandchildren.

Teutul's regular arguments with his son Paul Jr. became a routine occurrence during episodes of American Chopper. These vocal disagreements eventually led to Paul Jr. being fired in September 2008.

== See also ==
- List of American Chopper episodes
- List of American Chopper: Senior vs. Junior episodes
- List of Orange County Choppers episodes
