= William Kenefick =

American entrepreneur (born 1971)

William Sebastian Kenefick
- Born: William Sebastian Kenefick II; August 12, 1971 (age 54); Fullerton, California, United States

William Kenefick (born William Sebastian Kenefick II; August 12, 1971) is an American entrepreneur, businessman, investor, philanthropist, and former television personality. William was featured on Throttle Junkies TV in several movies, and is a motorcycle designer with dozens of Motorcycle Magazine features and covers worldwide.

Co Founder of Prophecy Bicycles, In 2019 he left the two wheeled world to pursue his other passion, business, founding a Medical supplies company, and then venturing out to found, and/or partner in more than 20 companies.

== Career ==
=== Custom Motorcycles ===
William nicknames his project bikes and cars, starting with Natasha – a 1995 Ducati 900SS which was completed in 1997.

- Natasha, Ducati 900SS
- Isabella, Ducati Monster
- Freddie Spencer Tribute, Honda CBR1000RR seen in Cycle World, Robb Report, Autoby Japan and MCN
- Wayne Rainey Tribute featured in Cycle World Magazine Robb Report, and MCN
- Full Tilt Boogie, featured in Robb Report Motorcycling and owned by Tim Allen (now owned by William Kenefick)
- Hideo “Pops” Yoshimura Tribute, Motorcyclist Magazine November 2008, Robb Report, MCN
- Transformers: Revenge of the Fallen motorcycles (Arcee, pink Ducati now owned by William Kenefick)
- Afari Seri, The first custom Ducati Streetfighter

- Fata a Mano, Hand built Ducati Cafe Racer

=== Work ===
Freddie Spencer Tribute

Cycle World show display

Full Tilt Boogie

Hideo “Pops” Yoshimura Tribute

== Personal life ==
William lives in Austin, Texas with his four children and wife, Summers McKay.

== General references ==
- Fill Tilt Boogie Ducati Monster
- Wayne Rainey Tribute article
- Cycle World article on Wayne Rainey Tribute
- Ventura County Star article
- Freddie Spencer Tribute
- Transformers 2 interview
