= Vincent DiMartino =

American motorcycle builder

- Born: October 9, 1972 (age 53); Hudson Valley, New York, U.S.
- Occupations: Motorcycle designer and builder
- Spouse: Melissa DiMartino
- Children: Vanessa DiMartino; Ava DiMartino; Isabella DiMartino; Vincent DiMartino
- Parent(s): John DiMartino; Margaret DiMartino
- Website: DiMartino Motorsports

Vincent DiMartino (born October 9, 1972) is an American automobile mechanic and motorcycle builder, best known for his work from 2002 to 2007 at Orange County Choppers (OCC), the subject of the American TV show American Chopper. In August 2007 DiMartino left Orange County Choppers and founded V-Force Customs, a custom motorcycle shop in Rock Tavern, NY. Several months later, Cody Connelly, a friend and co-worker of DiMartino at Orange County Choppers also left to join him at V-Force Customs. In 2010, DiMartino returned to the show; however instead of rejoining his former employer, OCC, he joined Paul Jr. Designs.

DiMartino, known as "Vinnie," was born to John and Margaret DiMartino. He is the second child of four. DiMartino and his wife Melissa have three girls and a boy, Vanessa, twins Isabella and Ava, and Vincent.

== History ==
DiMartino was born in 1972 in New York's Hudson Valley. At the age of nine DiMartino started hanging around his father's auto repair shop and soon became a "gearhead". At the age of 14 he began working for a small engine repair shop. A few years later he was rebuilding cars and motorcycles and pretty much anything else he could get his hands on. In 2002 DiMartino started working for Orange County Choppers which was owned by high school friend Paul Teutul Jr.'s father. Although a pilot episode was shot just before he was hired, it was only a month after starting his new job that DiMartino learned The Discovery Channel was turning his workplace into a reality television show called American Chopper.

== Career ==
DiMartino spent five years working for Orange County Choppers before leaving in August 2007.

== Departure from OCC ==
There has been a lot of discussion on the internet about the factors that led to DiMartino leaving OCC. From the V-Force Customs website "FAQ" Vinnie responds to the question stating:

I had gone as far as I could there. I really didn't have any chance for advancement, and I had always wanted to have my own shop, so the natural progression was to leave and start my own place. Nothing against them, but it was time to move on.

The American Chopper episode in which DiMartino leaves dedicated a little over four minutes to his departure. After he gave his notice, Paul Teutul Sr. was shown saying "everyone's replaceable" which he claims was only a fragment of what he actually said. OCC has said that they have no control over the editing of the show and what parts of the dialogue are edited out.

== V-Force Customs ==
Soon after leaving OCC, DiMartino started V-Force Customs located in Rock Tavern, NY, V-Force Customs is located in a brand new building designed for building bikes. V-force Customs first build was "V-Force 1", unveiled in Daytona Beach, Florida. Soon after the success of "V-force 1", V-force built a custom chopper for the Tampa Bay Storm Arena League Football team. DiMartino and Cody Connelly announced the build from mid-field at a Storm game at the St. Pete Times Forum in Tampa, Florida. The Tampa Bay Storm chopper was unveiled at The Storms' final game of the season on June 21, 2008. The bike is touring the southeast United States with all proceeds going to the Pinellas County Humane Society and The Shriners Hospital for Children in Tampa. Also in June, V-Force Customs had its ribbon cutting and grand opening in Rock Tavern, New York.

== New series ==
DiMartino appeared in the series Throttle Junkies TV on Resort and Residence TV, AMG TV, Untamed Sports TV, Altitude Sports and Entertainment, Bright House Sports Network, Cox Sports, CW West Palm, Time Warner Cable Sports (Buffalo/Syracuse), and LoneStar Cable Network. The series premiered on February 14, 2010. In a radio interview in June 2010, Dimartino stated that he was going to work with Paul Teutul, Jr. again at Paul Jr. Designs which will air as American Chopper: Senior vs. Junior while still running V-Force. Part of the agreement of DiMartino being on the show was that he would be able to wear hats and T-shirts bearing the V-Force logo to ensure that people wouldn't think that V-Force was out of business. DiMartino made his debut appearing in the first episode of the revamped series which aired in the U.S. on The Discovery Channel on Aug. 12, 2010.
