= Biketoberfest =

Motorcycle rally in Daytona Beach, Florida

- Status: Active
- Genre: Motorcycle rally
- Date: Weekend following Columbus Day
- Frequency: Annually
- Locations: Daytona Beach, Florida; DeLeon Springs, Florida
- Coordinates: 29°13′N 81°01′W
- Inaugurated: 1991 or 1992
- Founder: Janet Kersey, Georgia Turner
- Most recent: 15–18 October 2020
- Next event: 14–17 October 2021
- Attendance: c. 100,000
- Patron: Halifax Area Advertising Authority
- Website: biketoberfest.org

Biketoberfest is an annual motorcycle rally held in the fall in Daytona Beach, Florida since 1991 or 1992. In 1992 it was known as "Daytona Fall Tour"; in 1993, it started to be called Biketoberfest, and is now known as the "little brother" of the spring Daytona Beach Bike Week event. Attendance for Biketoberfest 2013 was estimated to be c. 100,000 visitors.

The event's organizing authority is Halifax Area Advertising Authority, whose director has noted attendance has dropped off since 2004, and the 100,000 attendance figure is an approximation as entry is free without a ticket, and that the true attendance is "nearly impossible to count". Local merchants have asked to have the event extended from four days to 10 days in duration. The advertising authority withdrew plans for a $300,000 advertising campaign in Ohio after studies showed negative perceptions of the Daytona Beach area.

Reporters have noted that compared to the spring Daytona rally, Biketoberfest features a higher proportion of choppers in attendance, warmer local waters and weather in transit from the Northeast United States, more new-model introductions from manufacturers, and less crowded streets and more abundant lodging.

The Buffalo Chip Campground (better known for its Sturgis Motorcycle Rally presence) opened a site at Daytona just before Biketoberfest 2004, raising concerns about public nudity. Earlier concerns had prompted the creation of a city ordinance with unusually detailed definitions of body coverage, gaining international attention. The ordinance was deemed unconstitutional on First Amendment grounds by a Federal judge in 2006.

Like the spring bike event in Daytona Beach, Biketoberfest features coleslaw wrestling.

While the racing at Daytona International Speedway is more club-oriented, the CCS-sanctioned Fall Cycle Scene races at the Speedway are technically part of Biketoberfest, similar to Bike Week's Supercross-oriented draws. The 2020 event will have the most races of a previous event, as the COVID-19 pandemic led to cancellation of all Bike Week road racing events, with the majority of events (including Bike Week's Flat Track races) moved to Biketoberfest. (The Daytona 200 was not held.) In 2022, Biketoberfest will extend to DeLeon Springs, as American Flat Track will hold the season finale of their series at Volusia Speedway Park for Biketoberfest, as the season starts at Daytona Beach Bike Week at the circuit.

== In media and the arts ==
The American Chopper television show pilot aired in January, 2003, titled "Biketober", concerned a custom motorcycle presented at Biketoberfest.

The pilot for a 2006 show, The Metric Revolution, was filmed at Biketoberfest.

The first Orange County Choppers themed motorcycle, a Spider-Man themed build, was done for Biketoberfest, as was the very first OCC bike "True Blue", shown there in 1999.

Performance artist Paul Zaloom created a 2006 shadow puppet play based on his experiences at Biketoberfest.
