= Student Loan Xpress =

Student Loan Xpress (SLX) is a member company of New York-based CIT Group Inc. SLX became a wholly owned subsidiary of CIT Group, Inc in 2005. They ceased originating loans on April 3, 2008. On May 19, 2008, CIT Group closed the San Diego office of Student Loan Xpress laying off 128 people. CIT continued to maintain IT operations in Cincinnati and their Loan Servicing center in Cleveland. CIT has since closed their student loan servicing organization and has transferred their Loans to be serviced by AES. Since May 19, 2008, SLX has become a shell corporation whose only function is to collect revenue from existing student loans for CIT Group, Inc.

SLX originated both private and federally backed FFELP loans.

Student Loan Xpress had been alleged to be involved in some scandals, such as bribes and kickbacks.
