= American Chopper =

American reality television program

- Genre: Reality
- Starring: Paul Teutul Sr.; Paul Teutul Jr.; Michael Teutul; Rick Petko; Jason Pohl; Vincent DiMartino Cody Connelly Mike Ammirati
- Narrated by: Mike Rowe (2003–2007); Jim Pratt (2007–2012)
- Composers: David Vanacore; (Vanacore Music)
- Country of origin: United States
- Original language: English
- No. of seasons: 8
- No. of episodes: 179 (list of episodes)

Production
- Executive producers: Craig Piligian; Sean Gallagher; Mark Finkelpearl; Judy Plavnick; Christo Doyle
- Running time: 42 minutes
- Production company: Pilgrim Films & Television

Original release
- Network: Discovery Channel
- Release: March 31, 2003 – October 18, 2007
- Network: TLC
- Release: January 17, 2008 – February 11, 2010
- Network: Discovery Channel
- Release: March 1, 2018 – August 4, 2020

American Chopper is an American reality television series that aired on Discovery Channel, produced by Pilgrim Films & Television. The series centered on Paul Teutul Sr. (frequently called Senior), and his son Paul Teutul Jr. (also known as Paulie or simply Junior), who manufactured custom chopper-style motorcycles. Orange County Choppers in Newburgh, New York. The contrasting work and creative styles of the father-and-son team and their resulting verbal arguments were the series' hallmark until 2008 when an explosive argument led to Paul Jr.'s termination and departure to start a competing chopper company, Paul Jr. Designs.

The series originally aired on Discovery Channel beginning in March 2003. In December 2007, the series moved to Discovery's sister channel TLC, starting off with an 18-hour marathon. Its first TLC season premiered in January 2008. Season 6 began in April 2009 but the series was canceled by TLC in February 2010. In July 2010, TLC announced that the Teutuls would return in a new series, American Chopper: Senior vs. Junior. Senior vs. Junior premiered on TLC but was soon moved to Discovery halfway through the first season. Discovery Channel announced that the show would end with "The Chopper Live: The Revenge" show on December 11, 2012 after 10 years.

== Featured staff ==
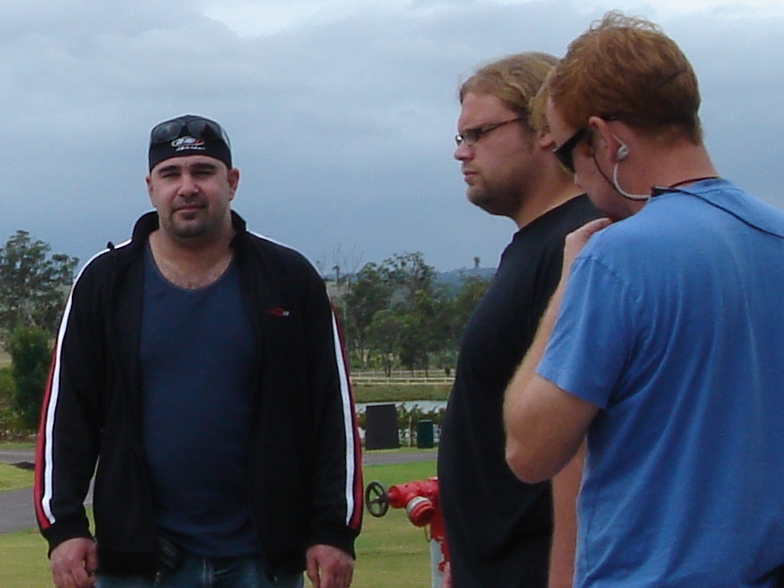
Vinnie (Working for Paul Jr.) and Mikey filming at an outside location.

The OCC fabricators and mechanics such as Paul Teutul Jr., Rick Petko, Nick Hansford, Christian Welter, and former employees Vincent DiMartino (who left OCC to start V-Force Customs in 2007), and Cody Connelly (a BOCES student intern who has since joined DiMartino's business), create dozens of custom motorcycles. Michael Teutul, usually referred to as "Mikey", serves as the shop's custodian and webmaster, and provides comic relief to the show. He has been seen doing metal work occasionally, as one of his early jobs was working at Orange County Ironworks. Also featured occasionally is Danny Teutul, the second oldest child, who succeeded Paul Sr. as the owner of Orange County Ironworks. Danny visits to do contracted work for the OCC facilities. The show also documents their personal and promotional activities ranging from magazine photo shoots to family holidays and custom bike shows.

== Original series (2002–2010) ==
=== Series overview ===
Overall Season	Series Season	Episodes	Originally aired	
Overall Season	Series Season	Episodes	Season premiere	Season finale
Pilots		2	September 29, 2002	January 19, 2003
1	1	29	March 31, 2003	May 10, 2004
2	2	30	June 7, 2004	September 26, 2005
3	3	25	October 3, 2005	August 28, 2006
4	4	25	November 6, 2006	October 18, 2007
5	5	26	January 17, 2008	October 30, 2008
6	6	26	April 9, 2009	February 11, 2010

=== Fantasy Bike Contest ===
During season 3, Discovery Channel sponsored a contest in which four winners received OCC motorcycles. Custom bike features were specified by the winning fans, who sent in videos expressing their reasons for wanting a bike. The contest winners were (in episode order): Jeff Clegg (Corporal Punishment), Susan Morisset (Female Snake Bike), Joseph McClendon (Custom Hog), Bryan King (Vertebrate Trike).

=== Paul Jr. leaves Orange County Choppers ===
Following regular disagreements with his father, Paul Jr. was fired from the shop in late 2008. In January 2009, TLC served a notice of default due to Paul Jr.'s absence. Paul Jr. then returned to OCC briefly as a contractor, but left finally in April 2009 in order to start his own design firm, Paul Jr. Designs. Paul Sr. then exercised a contractual option to purchase Paul Jr.'s 20% share in OCC, and subsequently filed a lawsuit to force the buyout. The case remained ongoing while a valuation of OCC was performed.

On December 14, 2010, Paul Jr. won his appeal of a lower court ruling forcing him to sell his 20% ownership of OCC to Paul Sr. Paul Jr.'s appeal asked that the agreement to sell be ruled invalid, so Paul Jr. will continue to own 20% of OCC until a fair selling price is agreed to. Paul Jr. has also filed a counter-suit laying out massive fraud on Paul Sr.'s part in dealing with Paul Jr.'s interests at OCC. The suit seeks $100 million in damages along with court-ordered controls over the company's finances to prevent further fraud.

After a one-year non-compete clause ended, Paul Jr. opened a motorcycle design company in April 2010. TLC then commissioned a 7th season titled American Chopper: Senior vs. Junior which features both OCC and Paul Jr. Designs.

=== Other legal issues ===
As of May 26, 2009, OCC is the defendant in a legal action filed by artist Justin Barnes, who alleges that his original designs were copied on merchandise without his permission and appropriate compensation.

In July 2009, Cody Connelly sued OCC and Paul Teutul Sr., seeking damages for misappropriation of likeness, breach of contract and fraud. He claimed the show used his likeness in posters, coloring books and other merchandise after he left it in 2007. Connelly also claimed that he never received "the old school chopper" that he helped design, though Paul Teutul Sr., said it would be his in one episode of the show.

=== Cancellation and Senior vs. Junior ===
On February 6, 2010, TLC announced that American Chopper's season finale scheduled for February 11 would also mark the end of the series, stating, "The Teutuls will always be a part of the Discovery family and we congratulate them on a tremendously successful series run." On April 7, TLC announced the Teutuls would return for a new series.

The new series, American Chopper: Senior vs. Junior, chronicles the aftermath of Paul Jr.'s departure from OCC and his construction of a new custom chopper company across the street from younger brother Dan's Orange County Iron Works. It premiered August 12, 2010 on TLC.

In December 2010, Senior vs. Junior was moved to the Discovery Channel, the network American Chopper originally debuted on. In Canada American Chopper started on January 8 on TLC and moved to Saturday nights at 10 p.m.

On February 7, 2011, Paul Teutul Jr. announced that American Chopper: Senior vs. Junior had been renewed for a second season and would return spring 2011.

On November 21, 2012, Eileen O'Neill, president of Discovery Network, announced the show had been cancelled. The final episode aired December 17, 2012.

== First series spin-off: Senior vs. Junior (2010–2012) ==
American Chopper
- Season 1 through 3 logo
- Also known as: American Chopper
- Starring: Paul Teutul Sr.; Paul Teutul Jr.; Vincent DiMartino; Cody Connelly; Rick Petko; Jason Pohl; Mike Ammirati; Brendon Thompson
- Narrated by: Jim Pratt
- Country of origin: United States
- Original language: English
- No. of seasons: 4
- No. of episodes: 70 (list of episodes)

Production
- Executive producers: Craig Piligan; Christo Doyle; Ralph Wikke
- Producers: Paul Teutul Sr.; Paul Teutul Jr.
- Cinematography: Brian Garrity; Omar Saleem
- Editors: A.G. Bealer; Adam Winkler; Patrick Murphey; Walter Ruiz
- Running time: 60 minutes

Original release
- Network: TLC (2010); Discovery Channel; (December 2010–2012)
- Release: August 12, 2010 – December 17, 2012

Related
- American Chopper; Orange County Choppers

American Chopper: Senior vs. Junior is a reality television spin-off which premiered on the TLC channel on August 12, 2010. The show chronicles the rivalry between Orange County Choppers (OCC) owned by Paul Teutul Sr. and his son Paul Teutul Jr.'s newly opened motorcycle business Paul Jr. Designs (PJD). The second season continued with brand new episodes that aired on Monday, August 29, 2011 at 9pm EST on Discovery Channel. The third season began on February 13, 2012. The fourth season premiered on September 3, 2012. On November 16, 2012, the Discovery Channel announced the cancellation of the show. The final episode aired on December 17, 2012. Paul Teutul Jr. posted a picture of himself with his father and brother Mike, all posing in front of the Teutul bike that Paul Jr. and Paul Sr. built during season 4.

=== Series overview ===
Overall season	Spin-off season	Episodes	Originally aired	
Overall season	Spin-off season	Episodes	Season premiere	Season finale
7	1	18	August 12, 2010	February 7, 2011
8	2	21	April 25, 2011	November 28, 2011
9	3	13	February 13, 2012	May 21, 2012
10	4	15	September 3, 2012	December 17, 2012

The cast makes an appearance on Season 2, Episode 3 "American Chopper Gun", of Sons of Guns where the crews collaborate on a dragon-themed gun. This episode coincides with American Chopper: Senior vs. Junior Season 2, Episode 2 "Big Guns".

==== Opening ====
The introduction is narrated by both Paul Sr. and Paul Jr.:

This road that we're on is only going to lead to one place. All this passion and pride brought us together. And drove us apart. It only makes sense that this ends where it started. With the build.

The fourth season (returning to American Chopper) intro is narrated by Paul Sr. and Paul Jr.:

[Senior]: It's important to move on. Underneath this (a tarp covered motorcycle) is where it all started. [Junior]: And now, we're going to rebuild it.

== Second series spin-off: Orange County Choppers (2013–2014) ==
Orange County Choppers is the second spin-off series of the American Chopper franchise. The show ran for one season on CMT with a 2-hour "pilot" and eight episodes between August 18, 2013 and January 11, 2014.

The series features Paul Teutul Sr. and his team as they fabricate some of the most complicated choppers of their careers. Evan Favaro is hired as Creative Director and proves his leadership ability and building skills at the shop.

== December 2014 special ==
On December 11, 2014, Discovery Channel aired an American Chopper special under the title "American Chopper: Shaq Bike", which featured the building of a chopper for former NBA star Shaquille O'Neal. It focused on the original Orange County Choppers business, with no sign of Paul Jr., though Michael Teutul (listed as a vice president) did appear and interact with his father. While there were a few new family members and fabricators, the crew at the shop appeared to be the same as the cast of the Orange County Choppers series, including Evan Favaro. According to Paul Sr., the Shaq "Man of Steel" bike is the biggest in OCC history. The specs: 48-inch handlebars, 6-inch rake, 23-inch front wheel and 20-inch rear wheel on a stretched frame.

== Original series revival (2018–2019) ==
A revival of the series aired in the spring of 2018 on Discovery Channel. According to the series Facebook page, the new season premiered on May 28, 2018 at 10 p.m. ET/PT on Discovery Channel.

A preview of the first episode of season 11 entitled "Welcome Back" aired on March 1, 2018. The episode featured the return of the Teutuls after ten years of their rocky father-son partnership, catching up to speed with Senior and Junior's separate lives and motorcycle businesses. At Orange County Choppers, Paul Sr. gets a two bike deal with Okada Resort in Manila, Philippines. Meanwhile, Paul Jr. works on a bike for Buffalo Chip Campground in Sturgis, South Dakota. Both come together when Junior asks his father to restore their Yankees bike which had been vandalized and then sold at an auto salvage auction.

=== Series overview ===
Overall Season	Series Season	Episodes	Originally aired	
Overall Season	Series Season	Episodes	Season premiere	Season finale
11	7	8	March 1, 2018	July 16, 2018
12	8	8	February 12, 2019	April 2, 2019

== August 2020 special ==
On July 28, 2020, it was announced that a TV special titled "American Chopper: The Last Ride" would premiere on August 4, 2020. The 2-hour special featured Senior and Junior who, over a decade, finally collaborate on building a bike together. This is the first time in series history that Orange County Choppers and Paul Junior Designs come together for one client. For one last time at the old OCC shop, they build a chopper for ABC Supply Company, the largest roofing and siding company in the U.S. However, they only have eight weeks to complete the bike because their original garage in Rock Tavern, NY is planned to be demolished.

== Release ==
=== Home media ===
Title	Release Date		
Title	Region 1	Region 2	Region 4
Black Widow Bike	—N/a	October 25, 2004	—N/a
Comanche Bike	—N/a	October 25, 2004	—N/a
Daytona & Old School Chopper	—N/a	October 24, 2004	—N/a
Dixie Chopper & Mikey Special	—N/a	April 4, 2005	—N/a
Jet Bike & Biketoberfest	—N/a	October 25, 2004	—N/a
Liberty Bike	—N/a	April 4, 2005	—N/a
Mikey's Bike	—N/a	October 25, 2004	—N/a
Miller Electric Bike	—N/a	April 4, 2005	—N/a
Series 1:Parts 1-3	—N/a	October 25, 2004	—N/a
Series 1:Parts 4-6	—N/a	October 25, 2004	—N/a
Series 2:Parts 7-9	—N/a	April 4, 2005	—N/a
Series 2:Parts 10-12	—N/a	April 4, 2005	—N/a
Series 3:Parts 13-15	—N/a	October 10, 2005	—N/a
Series 3:Parts 16-18	—N/a	October 10, 2005	—N/a
Series 4:Parts 19-21	—N/a	January 15, 2007	—N/a
Series 4:Parts 22-24	—N/a	January 15, 2007	—N/a
Series 5:Parts 25-30	—N/a	December 15, 2008	—N/a
Series 5:Parts 31-37	—N/a	December 15, 2008	—N/a
Series 5:Parts 38-45	—N/a	—N/a	—N/a
Series 6:Parts 40-42	—N/a	June 14, 2010	—N/a
Series 6:Parts 43-45	—N/a	June 14, 2010	—N/a

== Other media ==
=== Video games ===
Due to its popularity during the first seasons, American Chopper inspired two video game titles. The first was American Chopper developed by Creat Studios, and published by Activision Value, released for PlayStation 2, Microsoft Windows, and Xbox on November 23, 2004. The second, American Chopper 2: Full Throttle was also developed by Creat Studios, and published by Activision was released for PlayStation 2 and Xbox on November 16, 2005, then later for GameCube on November 22, 2005 and for Microsoft Windows on August 16, 2006.

A video pinball arcade game made by Incredible Technologies reached on-site play testing but was never released.

=== Meme ===
A series of memes were made using frames from the argument between Paul Teutul Sr. & Paul Teutul Jr. in season 6 episode 1. The meme format features captions placed over the two men in certain frames during their argument. The captions usually show some common argument in the current culture.

=== Parody ===
American Body Shop, an improvisational comedy shown on Comedy Central from July 8 to September 19, 2007, is a parody of American Chopper.

=== Azeroth Choppers ===
Azeroth Choppers was a weekly web series moderated by Blizzard Entertainment that featured Paul Teutul Jr. and his Paul Jr. Designs (PJD) team. The web series was shown between April 17 and June 5, 2014. It showcased the two motorcycle builds based around each of two factions, Alliance and Horde, in the MMORPG World of Warcraft.

== Accolades ==
Award Ceremony	Year (Note: Indicates the year of ceremony. Each year is linked to the article about the awards held that year, wherever possible.)	Category	Nominee(s) / Work	Result	Ref(s)
Australian Subscription Television and Radio Association (ASTRA) Awards	2007	Favourite International Personality or Actor	Paul Teutul Sr. and Paul Teutul Jr.: American Chopper; Discovery Channel	Won	
Australian Subscription Television and Radio Association (ASTRA) Awards	2007	Favourite International Program	American Chopper: Discovery Channel	Won	
Australian Subscription Television and Radio Association (ASTRA) Awards	2008	Favourite Program	American Chopper: Three-part "Australia Program"	Nominated	
Australian Subscription Television and Radio Association (ASTRA) Awards	2008	Most Outstanding Light Entertainment Program	American Chopper: Three-part "Australia Program"	Nominated	
Broadcast Music, Inc. (BMI) Film & Television Awards	2005	BMI Cable Award	Matt Koskenmaki (composer): American Chopper	Won	
Broadcast Music, Inc. (BMI) Film & Television Awards	2006	BMI Cable Award	Matt Koskenmaki (composer): American Chopper	Won	
Broadcast Music, Inc. (BMI) Film & Television Awards	2011	Top Television Series Underscore	Matt Koskenmaki (composer): American Chopper: Senior vs. Junior	Won	

== See also ==
- Orange County Choppers bikes
