= Silver State Helicopters =

American helicopter sightseeing company

- Type: Private
- Industry: Aviation
- Founded: 1999; 27 years ago (in Las Vegas, Nevada)
- Defunct: 2008; 18 years ago
- Fate: Bankruptcy, ceased operations
- Headquarters: 500 East Cheyenne Avenue, North Las Vegas, Nevada
- Key people: Jerry Airola, Founder, CEO
- Products: Flight training
- Website: SilverStateHelicopters.com (Archived website)

Silver State Helicopters was a helicopter flight training, sight seeing tours and charter air operator. The company was founded in 1999 by Jerry Airola, flying Robinson R22 helicopters. Silver State Helicopters expanded rapidly and reported revenues of US$40.7 million in 2005 and US$78.1 million in 2006. Silver State Helicopters ceased operations and entered bankruptcy on February 3, 2008.

== History ==
The company was founded in 1999 at Henderson Executive Airport with one Robinson R22 helicopter. In 2007, Silver State Helicopters expanded into the agriculture field with the purchase of Central Washington Helicopter. Silver State's intent was to give their students a chance to gain experience while allowing current pilots opportunities to advance their careers.

The company expanded into flight training in 2003, with a model based on the United States Army’s Fort Rucker based helicopter training program and an aim of establishing a helicopter school in every US state. Silver State Helicopters expanded at an unprecedented rate for a helicopter company, especially one that specialized in flight training. Its corporate headquarters was 500 East Cheyenne Avenue in North Las Vegas, Nevada and had flight academies located in 34 cities around the United States. By 2006, the company was 12th on Inc. magazine's list of the top 500 privately held companies in the United States. Airola sold the company to New York investment house EOS Partners in 2007, creating Silver State Services Corp. He moved from being President and CEO and became the General Manager instead. The plan was to give Silver State the opportunity to grow at an accelerated pace in the areas of flight training and other commercial operations.

Silver State initially attracted students by running television advertising in major urban centres, inviting interested people to come to a recruiting seminar and promising an "exciting career flying helicopters". The recruiting seminars featured a "carnival-like atmosphere" of helicopter rides with the charismatic Airola describing their future flying helicopters. The first recruiting seminar was expected to attract 100 people, but over 1,000 attended, convincing Airola that the plan had great potential. As a result, he expanded his recruitment efforts throughout the country.

Airola's pitch told seminar attendees that for an "investment" of just US$69,900 a Silver State Helicopter Academy location would take them from ab initio to a commercial helicopter license, certified instructor with an instrument rating in just 18 months. The program was carried out by a combination of classroom instruction, unlimited use of flight simulators at each location and 10 hours a week of helicopter flight time.

The factor that convinced many students to enroll was Airola's promise that most graduates would be hired by Silver State itself. The company provided access to student loan writers and distributed loan applications. Once students had their letter of acceptance they were required to provide a loan application fee of US$500. Students were required to sign a contract and code of conduct with classes starting within three weeks of recruitment. The terms of the student loans included that repayment was to commence at the conclusion of instruction, or after 18 months, whichever came first, at a rate of US$1000 per month. The loan agreements included a clause that the company would be paid one third of the full amount at the conclusion of 30, 60 and 90 days from the start of training, provided that the student was still receiving training at those points. This meant that the company had been fully paid for 18 months of training after only three months.

Silver State was initially interested in pursuing status as a United States Department of Veterans Affairs-approved flight school so that training could be provided to military veterans. The administration has much more stringent requirements for refunds than the company was willing to meet and so the company abandoned these plans, rather than change their loan programs. The company Vice President of training operations, Randy Rowles, explained that management informed him that "We only want about 20 percent of these people to finish." In an interview with Rotor & Wing' magazine Rowles explained that the company intended from the start that the majority of students would voluntarily cease training after the first three months, leaving them with the full debt for the loan and the company without the expense of training them. Many students did abandon the training because the school locations were understaffed, overcrowded with students and lacked sufficient aircraft. When the students did not complete their training in the 18-month period they had to start paying back their loans, but without having completed their licenses and without employment, forcing many to quit training to try to find jobs. Rowles told management that they must stop recruiting until the backlogs could be cleared, but he was overruled and recruiting was stepped up.

The company's contract, charter and tourism fleet of turbine aircraft were being used predominantly on non-revenue flights between recruiting venues to bolster local school locations and make it appear that they had more aircraft. This also meant that the company did not have jobs available for its graduates. Throughout 2007 the company started selling off aircraft from its training fleet to raise capital to increase recruiting, which further slowed down training. Orders for simulators were cancelled and aircraft ready for delivery from Robinson Helicopter were not picked up.

Randy Rowles summed up the company philosophy: "Silver State didn’t care about providing the service. Silver State cared about getting paid for the service."

Silver State had expanded their business into training potential Air Traffic Control candidates through their Air Traffic Control Academy in New Braunfels, Texas. Silver State claimed 13 of their 15 graduates from their inaugural class were offered employment with the Federal Aviation Administration.

Silver State had planned to open another helicopter flight training academy location at Stewart International Airport, about 50 nautical miles (93 km) north of New York City, including establishing a shuttle service from Stewart to Manhattan by the end of 2007.

=== Bankruptcy ===
Silver State Helicopters filed a petition with the US Bankruptcy Court for liquidation under Chapter 7 of the bankruptcy code and ceased all operations at 1733 hours Pacific Standard Time on February 3, 2008. At the time operations ended, the company had more than 800 employees and 2500 students who had no warning of the bankruptcy filing. A company statement released at the time said that the closure without warning was due to “a rapid, unprecedented downturn in the U.S. credit markets” which had curtailed the availability of student loans for the company's students and that this then resulted in a “sharp and sudden downturn in new student enrollment.” Silver State Helicopters' assets were listed at US$50,000 following the bankruptcy filing. Silver State Helicopters owes 5,000 creditors between US$10 and $50 million.

The company websites were all removed by February 6, 2008. On February 26, 2008, a special website for the Trustee for Silver State Helicopters Bankruptcy was launched. It listed 194 helicopters and five fixed wing aircraft for disposal.

In mid-February 2008 former Silver State students and their attorneys announced that they were planning class-action lawsuits against the company and its owner Jerry Airola. They announced that they would also sue the banks that lent student loans due to the high interest rates and terms of the loans.

Nicole Moon, spokesperson for Nevada Attorney General Catherine Cortez Masto, indicated that the Nevada Bureau of Consumer Protection was investigating potential criminal charges. Some of the other 16 states in which Silver State Helicopters had bases were also examining pursuing criminal charges.

Key Bank, who was a primary lender for student loans for Silver State students, was named as a defendant, by Pinnacle Law Group of San Francisco representing two former Silver State students in a California lawsuit as of 14 May 2008. The suit alleged that the bank and Silver State colluded to "ensnare" students to take out loans and pay Silver State the full amount of US$69,900 for their future flight training in advance. The Pinnacle suit also alleged that the bank "intentionally omitted" federally required consumer protection clauses in the loan documents. "We hope to obtain an injunction preventing the bank from enforcing its promissory notes and from contacting credit agencies regarding the notes," stated Pinnacle attorney Kevin Rooney.

== Analysis ==
On 23 May 2008 US Senator Bill Nelson (D-Fla) called for a Federal Trade Commission investigation of Silver State, indicating that he believes that it was a Ponzi scheme. Senator Nelson said:

"What Silver State was doing was taking the $70,000 up front and then it was using it immediately and they were trying to go out and recruit more students to get more $70,000 per student and therefore pay expenses as they went along with the money they were collecting from the students. Now if that's what this investigation ends up being, what that is a ponzi scheme."

Writing in Rotor and Wing magazine in March 2009, Ernie Stephens concluded:

It’s been a little more than a year since Silver State Helicopters (SSH) abruptly shut its doors on Feb. 3, 2008 and went out of business. That day also marked the last time that approx. 2,000 of its flight academy students saw any hope of getting the training they had paid nearly $70,000 for in advance. The perceived – and very probably factual - scam has been the talk of the helicopter industry ever since. In fact, it has become a verb in some places: "If I sign up for lessons, you’d better not do a Silver State on me!"

== Former management ==
Officer	Office
Jerry Airola	Founder and CEO
Steve Pickett	Chief Financial Officer
Rick Reyes	Chief Operations Officer, Flight Training
Nathan Todd	Chief Operations Officer, Commercial Operations
Doug Swenson	Chief Technology Officer
Robbie Cunningham	Chief Administrative Officer
Tim Nelson	Chief of Staff.
Gina Paglione	Vice President of Legal Affairs
Randy Rowles	Vice President of Training

== Litigation ==
=== Phoenix case ===
In one case reported by the Las Vegas Business Press, a case was filed in the U.S. District Court in Phoenix, plaintiffs claimed Silver State failed to deliver on its promise to train aspiring helicopter pilots. The case was dismissed in April 2007 but the parties involved are negotiating to reach a settlement.

In the Phoenix case, 18 plaintiffs were demanding a US$5 million minimum, not including attorney fees, for their failed promises by Silver State training schools in Arizona. One of the plaintiffs, Paul Mischel, claims he refinanced his house in order to pay a $55,000 loan to pay for 7 helicopter certificates/ratings which were supposed to be completed in 18 months, as advertised by Silver State Helicopters. 27 months into the program and he only had 3 of those certificates, which he claims are worthless.

Mischel and other plaintiffs claim that the school they attended did not have adequate helicopters, simulators and instructors to teach a class with 78 students. Mischel claimed he never completed his training but the way the loan was structured through Key Bank, the banking institution already paid Silver State the full amount in 10 months.

=== San Diego case ===
In a June 2006 lawsuit filed in the U.S. District Court in San Diego, 21 plaintiffs claimed Airola often made promises he didn't keep. The plaintiffs are asking for refunds of their tuition, which range from $50,000 to $75,000 per student. Silver State Helicopters claims it has reimbursed 19 of the 21 students involved in the San Diego lawsuit.

=== Silver State Helicopters student debt case settled ===
Student Loan Xpress, a member company of New York-based CIT Group Inc., agreed to forgive almost $113 million in debts for students of Silver States Helicopters flight school. The $112.7 million agreement involved 12 states; California, Nevada, Utah, Florida, Georgia, Idaho, Illinois, Missouri, Montana, Oklahoma, Oregon and Washington. Loan Xpress will forgive 75 percent of the amount borrowed by the majority of Silver State Helicopter's 2,700 students with the percentage of loan forgiveness per individual will vary by the amount of training that students successfully completed.

== Fleet ==
Silver State Helicopters fleet at time of bankruptcy:

Helicopters:

- 139 - Robinson R22
- 38 - Robinson R44
- 1 - Bell B206B-3
- 6 - Bell B206L-1 / L-4
- 2 - Bell 407
- 5 - Bell B222/B230
- 1 - Bell UH-1H
- 1 - Eurocopter SA315
- 2 - Hughes 500D

Fixed wing

- 3 - Cessna 172
- 1 - Cessna 414

== Incidents and accidents ==
On March 27, 2007 in Ponte Vedra Beach, Florida, a R-44 Raven II from Silver State at Craig Municipal Airport suffered a mechanical failure which led to loss of directional control. The loss of control led to a fatal crash of the aircraft, which took the lives of the instructor Tamara Williams and student pilot Juston Wyatt Duncan, 24. The fatal flight was the first flight after a 100/300 hour maintenance inspection was completed, which included a 30-minute test flight before returning the aircraft back into service. Tamara's sister Shannon filed a wrongful death lawsuit against Silver State Helicopters in August 2007.

On February 6, 2006 in Helena, Montana, a Silver State R-44 N7085U was intentionally crashed by its commercial helicopter instructor pilot. The National Transportation Safety Board determined the probable cause(s) of this accident as "intentional suicide". The unauthorized use of a helicopter and impairment by alcohol were factors.

On September 20, 2005 in Baker, California, a Silver State R-22 Beta N957SH crashed during a positioning flight of new helicopters to their respective destinations. The flight originated at the factory when Silver State took delivery of 12 new helicopters. The accident pilot was assigned to fly his helicopter to North Las Vegas, following 3 other Robinson helicopters. The aircraft were spaced about 15 minutes apart. The accident pilot departed Torrance Airport (Zamperini Field) at about 2:25 pm local time and was attempting to arrive in North Las Vegas by 4:00 pm. The normal flight time for this route in this type of aircraft is 2.5 to 3 hours. The accident pilot flew into adverse weather conditions which included rain, low clouds, lightning and moderate turbulence. A California Highway Patrol pilot had warned the accident pilot earlier of the rain and lightning to the northeast of the accident pilot's route. The next morning, the Silver State office determined the accident pilot did not reach his destination and initiated a search. The pilot was killed in the crash.

== See also ==
- List of defunct airlines of the United States
