= Daytona Beach Bike Week =

Motorcycle event and rally in Florida

Coordinates: 29°13′N 81°01′W

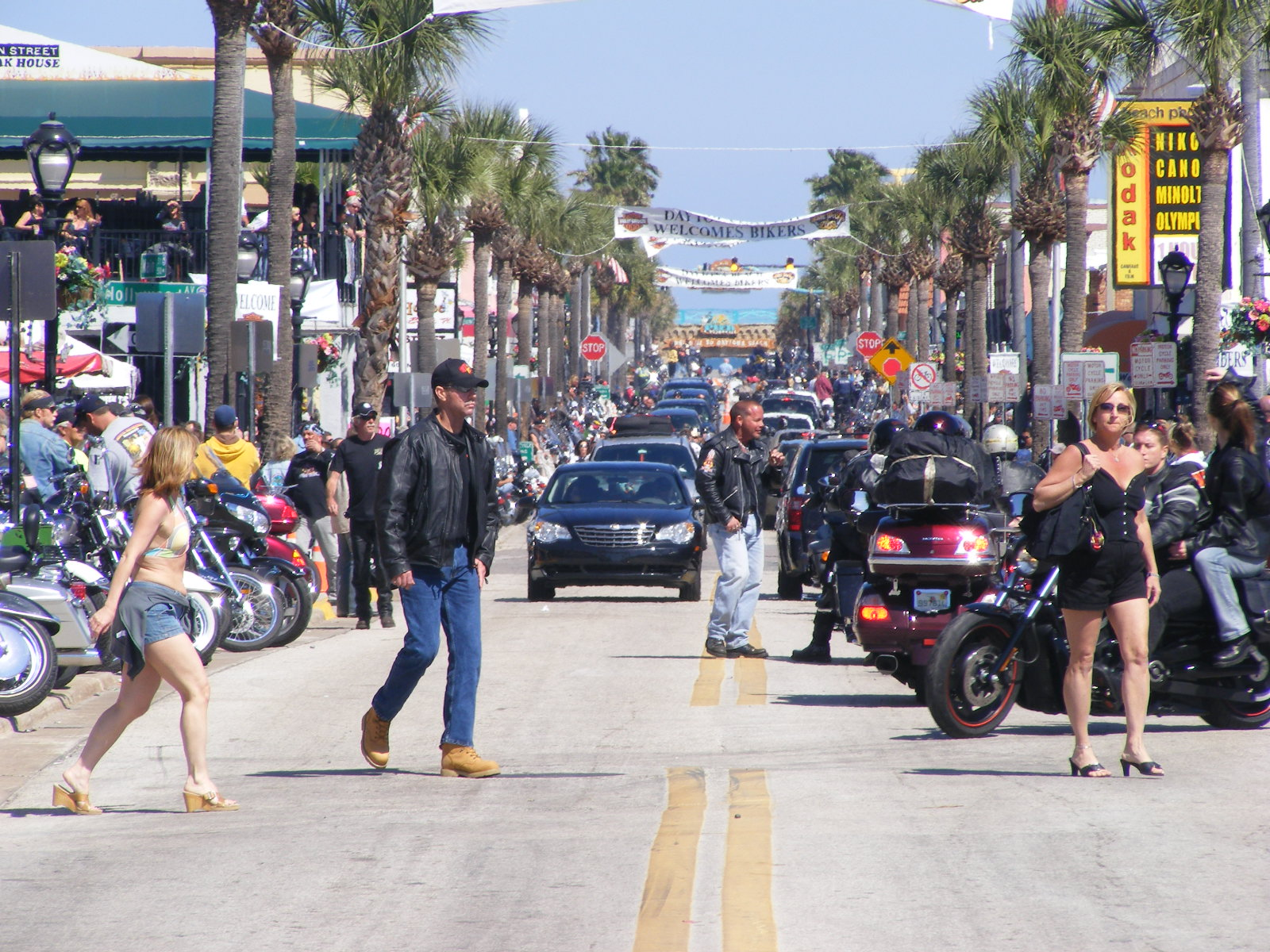
- Activity on Main Street, Bike Week 2008
- Locations: Daytona Beach and DeLeon Springs, Florida, USA
- Founded: 1937
- Attendance: 500,000
- Patron: Daytona Beach Chamber of Commerce
- Website: https://www.officialbikeweek.com/

Daytona Beach Bike Week, also called Daytona Bike Week, is a motorcycle event and rally held annually in Daytona Beach, Florida. Events occur throughout Volusia County, including the DeLand Bike Rally in Downtown DeLand on the first Saturday of Bike Week and other events in DeLeon Springs. Over 400,000 people make their way to the rally area for the 10-day event. The festivities include motorcycle racing, concerts, parties, and street festivals. The event is usually held on the first full week of March (including the Fri-Sat-Sun prior to) and contends with the Sturgis Motorcycle Rally as the most popular motorcycle rally in the United States.

== History ==
The Daytona Beach Bike Week rally started as the Daytona 200 race on January 24, 1937. This first race was a 3.2 miles (5.1 km) beach and pavement course. It was won by Ed Kretz from California riding an Indian motorcycle with an average speed of 73.34 mph (118.03 km/h).

This yearly race took a break from 1942 to 1947 due to World War II and again in 2020 because of a global pandemic (although the pandemic situation began in the middle of Bike Week, as the Daytona Supercross had finished the week before). During the years off, an unofficial event was still taking place commonly called Bike Week.

In 1947 the official race resumed and gained in popularity. The event was then promoted by Bill France Sr., co-founder of NASCAR, and the family business (now known as International Speedway Corporation) still promotes the 200 and the entire Bike Week races at Daytona International Speedway, including the Daytona Supercross which is known for its world-class pyrotechnics and light show.

In 2010, Daytona Beach Municipal Stadium officials made renovations in the stadium that eliminated the quarter-mile flat track for American Flat Track motorcycle events during Bike Week races. Officials moved those races to the Speedway on a quarter-mile track near Turn 1 of the superspeedway at a track used also during KartWeek. However, in 2021, the series moved flat track races out of Daytona, agreeing with World Racing Group, which sanctions the World of Outlaws Sprint Cars, DIRT Modifieds, and other dirt track events, to hold the events in DeLeon Springs at World Racing Group-owned Volusia Speedway Park.

=== Deaths ===
Most years there are deaths at the festival due to rider accidents.

Year	Deaths	Notes
2000	15	Record at the time (only surpassed in 2006).
2001	6	
2002	13	
2003	1	
2006	20	Highest recorded annual death toll.
2007	8	
2008	7	
2009	7	
2010	4	
2011	3	
2012	8	
2013	3	
2014	3	
2021	8	
2022	5	

== Law enforcement ==
Law enforcement for Bike Week is provided by the Daytona Beach Police Department and the Volusia County Sheriff's Office.

== Trademark dispute ==
In April 2009, a New York-based holding company named Mettemp filed a claim in the State of New York as being the owner of the phrase "Daytona Beach Bike Week." Daytona Beach area businesses that have marketed T-shirts and other products with this slogan have been contacted by the NY company, claiming infringement of trademark. The Daytona Regional Chamber of Commerce, which actually sponsors the Bike Week event, has challenged the NY Trademark and has hired the law firm of Cobb Cole to contest Mettemp's claim and block the New York company's bid to obtain a federal trademark.

== Biketoberfest ==
In 1991, the Daytona Beach Convention and Visitors Bureau created a second motorcycle festival event in October, named Biketoberfest. Biketoberfest is usually scheduled for the weekend immediately following Columbus Day, although some participants arrive on Columbus Day weekend and visit for the entire week. Part of the fun is a twelve-mile ride along a scenic route, known as the Ormond Scenic Loop and Trail. Daytona International Speedway also sponsors some motorcycle races to coincide with the dates of Biketoberfest.
