= Orange County Choppers =

American motorcycle manufacturer based in Orange County, New York

- Type: Privately held company
- Industry: Motorcycle customizer
- Founded: 1999
- Headquarters: Clearwater, Florida, United States
- Products: Custom motorcycles
- Number of employees: 70
- Website: orangecountychoppers.com

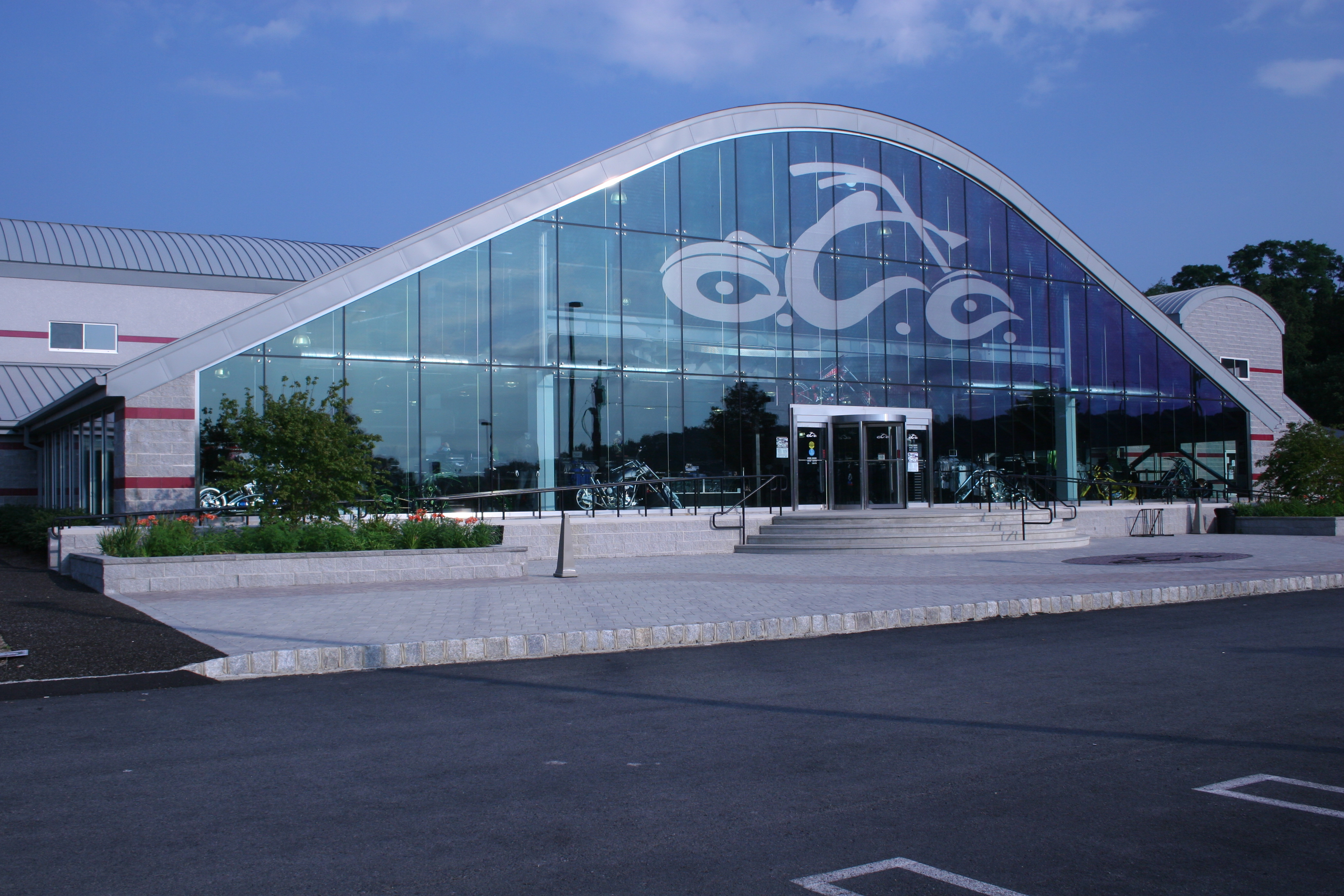
Orange County Choppers former world headquarters near Newburgh, New York

Orange County Choppers (OCC) is an American motorcycle manufacturer and lifestyle brand company based in the town of Newburgh, located in Orange County, New York, OCC was founded in 1999 by Paul Teutul Sr. The company was featured on American Chopper, a reality TV show that debuted in September 2002 on the Discovery Channel. The series moved to Discovery Channel's sister channel TLC in 2007. Following cancellation of the Discovery series, the company was also featured on Orange County Choppers on the CMT network in 2013. Orange County Choppers returned to Discovery Channel in March 2018.

== History ==
In the late 1990s, Paul Teutul Sr. began manufacturing custom motorcycles as an extension of his steel business (OC Iron Works), and in 1999 he founded Orange County Choppers, in Rock Tavern, New York at 27 Stone Castle Rd (off New York State Route 17K) and later moving to 10 Factory St in Montgomery, NY. The company's first bike, "True Blue", was debuted at the 1999 Daytona Biketoberfest.

Due to the success of their reality TV show, which premiered September 2002 on Discovery channel, OCC built a new $12 million, 61,000 square foot, custom facility which opened in April 2008, in Newburgh at 14 Crossroads Crt (off Rt 17k). The company owned the property until 2011, but surrendered the building to its lender, GE Commercial Finance Business Corp., to avoid foreclosure. It continued to lease about two-thirds of the property. GE Commercial Finance then sold the property to BRE East Mixed Asset Owner LLC of Dallas in March 2016.

In late 2020, the decision was made to close the Newburgh location and build a new facility in Pinellas Park, Florida, adjoining Bert's Barracuda Harley-Davidson. The new location, named OCC Road House & Museum, will include a bike-building shop and retail section, museum, restaurant, billiard hall, and concert pavilion. The building opened in late June 2021. Meanwhile, the old building is now a self-storage facility with the adjoining cafe also closed down, the signage can still be seen today.

== Key personnel ==
- Paul Teutul Sr. – Founder
- Joan Kay – Chief Executive Officer
- Jim Kerr - Chief Operating Officer / Bike Builder
- Michael Teutul - Bike Builder (Contractor)
- Rick Petko - Bike Builder (Contractor)
- Christian Welker - Bike Builder (Contractor)
- Ken Picozzi - Painter (Contractor)

=== Former personnel ===
- Paul Teutul Jr. – former minority owner/chief designer and fabricator
- Vincent DiMartino – mechanic/assembler (resigned in 2007)
- Cody Connelly – mechanic/assembler (resigned in 2007)
- Jason Pohl – senior designer
- Jim "JQ" Quinn – engineer/machinist

== Bikes ==
OCC is known for building custom theme bikes featured on American Chopper. Additionally, OCC launched a limited edition production line of motorcycles in July 2007, priced beginning at $31,000.

One of OCC's most popular bikes is The Fire Bike, to commemorate the New York firefighters who lost their lives on 9/11. The bike itself has been modeled after a fire truck, and a steel rivet that came from the collapsed World Trade Center is mounted atop the bike's gas tank. Paul Jr. stated that the bike was named "343", the number of New York firefighters who died on 9/11.

The popularity of American Chopper led the United States Air Force to commission a $150,000 "Air Force Bike", first put on public display in March 2005. The motorcycle is ten feet long and is modeled after the F-22 Raptor, complete with Air Force symbol rims, riveted gas tank, Raptor exhausts and rear view mirrors in the shape of jets.

== Music ==
Orange County Choppers held a series of free music performances within the retail store. P.O.D., Candlebox, Saliva, Red, 10 Years, Fair to Midland, and Framing Hanley have performed. On April 25, 2009, Smile Empty Soul and Earshot performed to celebrate the decade of the company's work. Additionally, OCC in October in conjunction with RED/Sony released a classic rock compilation CD featuring some of Paul Sr.'s favorite songs titled OCC Rocks. The CD also includes original music from The OCC Band, which features four of the shop's employees. Black Label Society performed a concert in the retail store to promote their album Order of the Black.

== Orange County Choppers MotoCoaster ==
The MotoCoaster is a Zamperla built motorbike themed roller coaster installed at Darien Lake theme park in Darien Lake, NY. It was the first motorbike roller coaster to be installed in the United States, though the Pony Express, a similar model of coaster with horse themed trains, was erected at Knott's Berry Farm. The MotoCoaster is the same model as the prototype located outside Zamperla's factory in Italy.

The MotoCoaster opened in May 2008 with Orange County Choppers securing the naming rights. The MotoCoaster is located near the Darien Square area of the park, between Boomerang and Twister. Orange County Choppers built a custom motorcycle inspired by the ride and the park. The coaster was originally named the Orange County Choppers Motocoaster when it first opened in 2008. However, the name was changed to the MotoCoaster in 2010 after the naming rights with OCC expired.

== Popular meme ==
A popular internet meme, started in 2011 and based on the show, became widely popular on social media in early 2018. The meme consists of five panels depicting a dispute between Paul Sr. and his son Paul Jr. In the original scene, Paul Sr. shouts at Paul Jr. for being late to work and Paul Jr. shouts back, throws a chair, and then eventually storms away. In the meme, users enter the dialogue of the five panels to create a dispute over any issue.
