= 2013 Aaron's 312 =

Eighth race of the 2013 NASCAR Nationwide Series

Race details
- Race 8 of 33 of the 2013 NASCAR Nationwide Series
- Date: May 4, 2013
- Official name: 22nd Annual Aaron's 312
- Location: Lincoln, Alabama, Talladega Superspeedway
- Course: Permanent racing facility
- Course length: 2.66 miles (4.28 km)
- Distance: 110 laps, 292.6 mi (470.894 km)
- Scheduled distance: 117 laps, 311.22 mi (500.86 km)
- Average speed: 133.269 miles per hour (214.476 km/h)

Pole position
Driver	Travis Pastrana	Roush Fenway Racing
- Time: 54.255

Most laps led
Driver	Joey Logano	Penske Racing
- Laps: 35

Winner
No. 7	Regan Smith	JR Motorsports

Television in the United States
- Network: ABC
- Announcers: Allen Bestwick, Carl Edwards, Andy Petree

Radio in the United States
- Radio: Motor Racing Network

The 2013 Aaron's 312 was the eighth stock car race of the 2013 NASCAR Nationwide Series and the 22nd iteration of the event. The race was held on Saturday, May 4, 2013, in Lincoln, Alabama, at Talladega Superspeedway, a 2.66-mile (4.28 km) permanent triangle-shaped superspeedway. The race was shortened from 117 laps to 110 due to impending darkness. After a wreck-fest race, Regan Smith, driving for JR Motorsports, would win the race under caution, a controversial win as the caution had been called just barely 200 feet from the finish, as if the drivers had been allowed to race back to the line, eventual-third-place finisher, teammate Kasey Kahne, would have won. The win was Smith's second career NASCAR Nationwide Series win and his first win of the season. To fill out the podium, Joey Logano of Penske Racing would finish second.

== Background ==
The layout of Talladega Superspeedway, the venue where the race was held.

Talladega Superspeedway, originally known as Alabama International Motor Superspeedway (AIMS), is a motorsports complex located north of Talladega, Alabama. It is located on the former Anniston Air Force Base in the small city of Lincoln. The track is a tri-oval and was constructed in the 1960s by the International Speedway Corporation, a business controlled by the France family. Talladega is most known for its steep banking and the unique location of the start/finish line that's located just past the exit to pit road. The track currently hosts the NASCAR series such as the NASCAR Cup Series, Xfinity Series and the Gander RV & Outdoors Truck Series. Talladega is the longest NASCAR oval with a length of 2.66-mile-long (4.28 km) tri-oval like the Daytona International Speedway, which also is a 2.5-mile-long (4 km) tri-oval.

=== Entry list ===
#	Driver	Team	Make	Sponsor
00	Blake Koch	SR² Motorsports	Toyota	VIP Poker, Headrush
1	Kurt Busch	Phoenix Racing	Chevrolet	Phoenix Racing
01	Mike Wallace	JD Motorsports	Chevrolet	G&K Services
2	Brian Scott	Richard Childress Racing	Chevrolet	Armour Vienna Sausage
3	Austin Dillon	Richard Childress Racing	Chevrolet	AdvoCare Spark
4	Landon Cassill	JD Motorsports	Chevrolet	Flex Seal
5	Kasey Kahne	JR Motorsports	Chevrolet	Great Clips
6	Trevor Bayne	Roush Fenway Racing	Ford	Cargill "Our Certified Ground Beef"
7	Regan Smith	JR Motorsports	Chevrolet	TaxSlayer
10	Jeff Green	TriStar Motorsports	Toyota	TriStar Motorsports
11	Elliott Sadler	Joe Gibbs Racing	Toyota	OneMain Financial
12	Sam Hornish Jr.	Penske Racing	Ford	Würth
14	Eric McClure	TriStar Motorsports	Toyota	Hefty, Reynolds Wrap
15	Stanton Barrett	Rick Ware Racing	Ford	FAIR Girls
19	Mike Bliss	TriStar Motorsports	Toyota	Dixie Chopper
20	Brian Vickers	Joe Gibbs Racing	Toyota	Dollar General
22	Joey Logano	Penske Racing	Ford	Discount Tire
23	Robert Richardson Jr.	R3 Motorsports	Chevrolet	Stalk It
24	Jason White	SR² Motorsports	Toyota	JW Demolition
25	John Wes Townley	Venturini Motorsports	Toyota	Zaxby's
27	David Green*	SR² Motorsports	Toyota	#teamBOOM!
30	Nelson Piquet Jr.	Turner Scott Motorsports	Chevrolet	Worx Yard Tools
31	Justin Allgaier	Turner Scott Motorsports	Chevrolet	Brandt Professional Agriculture
32	Kyle Larson	Turner Scott Motorsports	Chevrolet	Cessna
33	Kevin Harvick	Richard Childress Racing	Chevrolet	WESCO
34	Danica Patrick	Turner Scott Motorsports	Chevrolet	AccuDoc Solutions
40	Josh Wise	The Motorsports Group	Chevrolet	The Motorsports Group
42	J. J. Yeley*	The Motorsports Group	Chevrolet	The Motorsports Group
43	Reed Sorenson	Richard Petty Motorsports	Ford	Pilot Flying J
44	Hal Martin	TriStar Motorsports	Toyota	American Custom Yachts
46	Chase Miller*	The Motorsports Group	Chevrolet	The Motorsports Group
47	Scott Riggs*	The Motorsports Group	Chevrolet	The Motorsports Group
51	Jeremy Clements	Jeremy Clements Racing	Chevrolet	All South Electric, Repairable Vehicles
52	Donnie Neuenberger	Jimmy Means Racing	Chevrolet	Eagle Convenience Stores
54	Joey Coulter	Joe Gibbs Racing	Toyota	Monster Energy
55	Jamie Dick	Viva Motorsports	Chevrolet	Viva Motorsports
60	Travis Pastrana	Roush Fenway Racing	Ford	Roush Fenway Racing
70	Johanna Long	ML Motorsports	Chevrolet	Foretravel Motorcoach
74	Mike Harmon	Mike Harmon Racing	Dodge	StoneBridge Construction, Haag Brown
77	Parker Kligerman	Kyle Busch Motorsports	Toyota	Bandit Chippers, Camp Horsin' Around
79	Jeffrey Earnhardt	Go Green Racing	Ford	Oath Keepers, Fast Wax
85	Bobby Gerhart	Gerhart Racing	Chevrolet	Lucas Oil
87	Joe Nemechek	NEMCO Motorsports	Toyota	Maddie's Place Rocks
89	Morgan Shepherd	Shepherd Racing Ventures	Dodge	Racing with Jesus
92	Tim Andrews	KH Motorsports	Ford	Maddie's Place Rocks
99	Alex Bowman	RAB Racing	Toyota	SchoolTipline
Official entry list

== Practice ==
=== First practice ===
The first practice session was held on Thursday, May 2, at 3:00 PM CST, and would last for 45 minutes. Trevor Bayne of Roush Fenway Racing would set the fastest time in the session, with a lap of 50.275 and an average speed of 190.472 miles per hour (306.535 km/h).

Pos.	#	Driver	Team	Make	Time	Speed
1	6	Trevor Bayne	Roush Fenway Racing	Ford	50.275	190.472
2	5	Kasey Kahne	JR Motorsports	Chevrolet	50.277	190.465
3	30	Nelson Piquet Jr.	Turner Scott Motorsports	Chevrolet	50.355	190.170
Full first practice results

=== Second and final practice ===
The second and final practice session, sometimes referred to as Happy Hour, was held on Thursday, May 2, at 4:00 PM CST, and would last for 50 minutes. Ty Dillon of Richard Childress Racing would set the fastest time in the session, with a lap of 49.841 and an average speed of 192.131 miles per hour (309.205 km/h).

Pos.	#	Driver	Team	Make	Time	Speed
1	33	Ty Dillon	Richard Childress Racing	Chevrolet	49.841	192.131
2	6	Trevor Bayne	Roush Fenway Racing	Ford	49.842	192.127
3	60	Travis Pastrana	Roush Fenway Racing	Ford	50.133	191.012
Full Happy Hour practice results

== Qualifying ==
Qualifying was held on Friday, May 3, at 11:10 PM CST. Each driver would have two laps to set a fastest time; the fastest of the two would count as their official qualifying lap.

Travis Pastrana of Roush Fenway Racing would win the pole, setting a time of 54.255 and an average speed of 176.500 miles per hour (284.049 km/h), his first career NASCAR pole and the first for owner Jack Roush at Talladega. Pastrana stated, “It sounds like a dream come true. Bringing the guys to the line at the green flag at Talladega is awesome, so I’m definitely excited."

Two drivers would fail to qualify: Stanton Barrett and John Wes Townley, who despite qualifying in tenth, was disallowed after his car was found to be too low.

=== Full qualifying results ===
Pos.	#	Driver	Team	Make	Time	Speed
1	60	Travis Pastrana	Roush Fenway Racing	Ford	54.255	176.500
2	3	Austin Dillon	Richard Childress Racing	Chevrolet	54.359	176.162
3	6	Trevor Bayne	Roush Fenway Racing	Ford	54.387	176.071
4	34	Danica Patrick	Turner Scott Motorsports	Chevrolet	54.447	175.877
5	31	Justin Allgaier	Turner Scott Motorsports	Chevrolet	54.450	175.868
6	12	Sam Hornish Jr.	Penske Racing	Ford	54.480	175.771
7	11	Elliott Sadler	Joe Gibbs Racing	Toyota	54.492	175.732
8	2	Brian Scott	Richard Childress Racing	Chevrolet	54.537	175.587
9	1	Kurt Busch	Phoenix Racing	Chevrolet	54.558	175.520
10	54	Joey Coulter	Joe Gibbs Racing	Toyota	54.617	175.330
11	5	Kasey Kahne	JR Motorsports	Chevrolet	54.619	175.324
12	22	Joey Logano	Penske Racing	Ford	54.636	175.269
13	10	Jeff Green	TriStar Motorsports	Toyota	54.652	175.218
14	99	Alex Bowman	RAB Racing	Toyota	54.655	175.208
15	43	Reed Sorenson	Richard Petty Motorsports	Ford	54.657	175.202
16	30	Nelson Piquet Jr.	Turner Scott Motorsports	Chevrolet	54.660	175.192
17	33	Ty Dillon	Richard Childress Racing	Chevrolet	54.685	175.112
18	77	Parker Kligerman	Kyle Busch Motorsports	Toyota	54.729	174.971
19	32	Kyle Larson	Turner Scott Motorsports	Chevrolet	54.744	174.923
20	7	Regan Smith	JR Motorsports	Chevrolet	54.750	174.904
21	20	Brian Vickers	Joe Gibbs Racing	Toyota	54.792	174.770
22	4	Landon Cassill	JD Motorsports	Chevrolet	54.914	174.382
23	14	Eric McClure	TriStar Motorsports	Toyota	54.920	174.363
24	19	Mike Bliss	TriStar Motorsports	Toyota	54.984	174.160
25	70	Johanna Long	ML Motorsports	Chevrolet	54.997	174.119
26	85	Bobby Gerhart	Gerhart Racing	Chevrolet	55.035	173.998
27	79	Jeffrey Earnhardt	Go Green Racing	Ford	55.079	173.859
28	74	Mike Harmon	Mike Harmon Racing	Dodge	55.091	173.821
29	55	Jamie Dick	Viva Motorsports	Chevrolet	55.137	173.676
30	87	Joe Nemechek	NEMCO Motorsports	Toyota	55.170	173.573
31	24	Jason White	SR² Motorsports	Toyota	55.229	173.387
32	44	Hal Martin	TriStar Motorsports	Toyota	55.341	173.036
33	23	Robert Richardson Jr.	R3 Motorsports	Chevrolet	55.399	172.855
34	00	Blake Koch	SR² Motorsports	Toyota	55.429	172.762
35	89	Morgan Shepherd	Shepherd Racing Ventures	Dodge	55.556	172.367
36	52	Donnie Neuenberger	Jimmy Means Racing	Chevrolet	55.686	171.964
37	51	Jeremy Clements	Jeremy Clements Racing	Chevrolet	55.698	171.927
38	01	Mike Wallace	JD Motorsports	Chevrolet	55.806	171.594
Qualified by owner's points
39	40	Josh Wise	The Motorsports Group	Chevrolet	55.992	171.024
Last car to qualify on time
40	92	Tim Andrews	KH Motorsports	Ford	55.751	171.764
Failed to qualify or withdrew
41	15	Stanton Barrett	Rick Ware Racing	Ford	56.144	170.561
42	25	John Wes Townley	Venturini Motorsports	Toyota	—*	—*
WD	27	David Green	SR² Motorsports	Toyota	—	—
WD	42	J. J. Yeley	The Motorsports Group	Chevrolet	—	—
WD	46	Chase Miller	The Motorsports Group	Chevrolet	—	—
WD	47	Scott Riggs	The Motorsports Group	Chevrolet	—	—
Official starting lineup

== Race ==
Pole sitter Travis Pastrana led the first lap of the race. On lap 5, Pastrana and Roush Racing teammate Trevor Bayne decided to swap tandems but fell back as the pack caught up to the 2 cars. Ty Dillon took the lead from Bayne and Pastrana with a push by Kurt Busch. Busch swapped positions with Dillon on the next lap but fell back as Kasey Kahne took the lead after Busch led lap 6. Elliott Sadler took the lead from Kahne on lap 13 and Kahne took it back the next lap. The first caution flew on lap 14 when Danica Patrick crashed in turn 3. Joey Logano won the race off of pit road making him the race leader. Allgaier passed Logano for the lead on lap 19 but soon both began to swap the lead with Logano getting pushed by Sam Hornish Jr. and Allgaier getting pushed by Kurt Busch. Brian Vickers took the lead from Logano on lap 26 but Logano took it back on the next lap of the race. On lap 34, Kasey Kahne passed Logano for the lead but gave it back to Logano on the next lap. On lap 35, the second caution flew for a 2 car crash in turn 3 involving Kyle Larson and Jeffery Earnhardt. Logano won the race off of pit road keeping his lead. On lap 42, Logano got passed by Elliott Sadler giving Sadler the lead. Logano took it back on lap 44 and led the next 11 laps of the race. On lap 55, Logano and his drafting partner Kasey Kahne switched positions to prevent Kahne from overheating and gave the lead to Elliott Sadler. On lap 57, Brian Scott took the lead from Sadler. On lap 58, Reed Sorenson took the lead followed by Trevor Bayne on lap 59. On lap 60, Kasey Kahne took the lead from Bayne. On lap 63, Regan Smith took the lead and both Smith and Kahne began to swap the lead from each other. With 46 laps to go, the third caution flew when Reed Sorenson got turned by Brian Scott on the backstretch and got run into by Travis Pastrana lifting Sorenson's rear end into the air. Joey Logano once again won the race off of pit road to keep his lead. The race restarted with 39 to go. With 37 to go, Parker Kligerman took the lead. Both Kligerman and Kurt Busch began to swap the lead from each other before with 31 laps to go, Kasey Kahne took the lead. With 30 to go, Kurt Busch took the lead back from Kahne. On the same lap, Blake Koch got turned by Justin Allgaier and hit the outside wall coming out of turn 2. The race restarted with 27 laps to go and Kurt Busch leading the race. Justin Allgaier tried to take the lead but failed and Busch led with 26 to go.

=== Final laps ===
With 25 laps to go in turn 3, the big one struck taking out 13 cars. Sam Hornish Jr. moved down trying to avoid Johanna Long but got turned by Eric McClure and both turned down into Brian Scott and Tim Andrews and the 4 cars spun up the racetrack collecting more cars. The cars involved were Johanna Long, Brian Scott, Trevor Bayne, Robert Richardson Jr., Sam Hornish Jr., Bobby Gerhart, Mike Harmon, Tim Andrews, Ty Dillon, Eric McClure, Kyle Larson, Nelson Piquet Jr., and Donnie Neuenberger. During the caution period, NASCAR announced that they were gonna shorten the race to 107 laps due to the darkness that was falling. The race restarted with 7 laps to go on lap 101 with Kurt Busch as the leader. Regan Smith took the lead from Busch on that lap but Busch took it back with 6 laps to go. With 3 laps to go, Austin Dillon took the lead from Busch. But on the same lap, Joey Coulter crashed in the tri-oval bringing out 6th caution and setting up a green-white-checker. On the restart, Dillon took the lead from Busch. On the final lap, Busch took the lead with a push by Justin Allgaier. Joey Logano pulled up to the Busch's outside with a push by Alex Bowman but Logano moved up to block Regan Smith and Smith went to the bottom of the track. Both Smith and Logano went by Busch and Kahne pulled up to the outside of them. Meanwhile, behind the 4 cars, Brian Vickers got turned by Elliott Sadler and collected Alex Bowman, Landon Cassill, Mike Wallace, Jamie Dick, and Josh Wise. Instead of letting them race back since the finish line was about 1,000 feet away, NASCAR threw the caution before they reached the finish line. Kasey Kahne crossed the finish line first but Regan Smith was in front when the caution came out and NASCAR declared him the winner. Joey Logano, Kasey Kahne, Kurt Busch, and Justin Allgaier rounded out the top 5 while Parker Kligerman, Mike Wallace, Jason White, Jeremy Clements, and Austin Dillon rounded out the top 10.

== Race results ==
Fin	St	#	Driver	Team	Make	Laps	Led	Status	Pts	Winnings
1	20	7	Regan Smith	JR Motorsports	Chevrolet	110	7	running	47	$53,445
2	12	22	Joey Logano	Penske Racing	Ford	110	35	running	0	$39,725
3	11	5	Kasey Kahne	JR Motorsports	Chevrolet	110	16	running	0	$30,500
4	9	1	Kurt Busch	Phoenix Racing	Chevrolet	110	19	running	0	$29,275
5	5	31	Justin Allgaier	Turner Scott Motorsports	Chevrolet	110	4	running	40	$32,550
6	18	77	Parker Kligerman	Kyle Busch Motorsports	Toyota	110	4	running	39	$28,100
7	38	01	Mike Wallace	JD Motorsports	Chevrolet	110	0	running	37	$26,500
8	31	24	Jason White	SR² Motorsports	Toyota	110	0	running	36	$25,850
9	37	51	Jeremy Clements	Jeremy Clements Racing	Chevrolet	110	0	running	35	$25,225
10	2	3	Austin Dillon	Richard Childress Racing	Chevrolet	110	5	running	35	$26,825
11	7	11	Elliott Sadler	Joe Gibbs Racing	Toyota	110	5	running	34	$25,975
12	29	55	Jamie Dick	Viva Motorsports	Chevrolet	110	0	running	32	$18,850
13	14	99	Alex Bowman	RAB Racing	Toyota	110	0	running	31	$25,675
14	24	19	Mike Bliss	TriStar Motorsports	Toyota	110	0	running	30	$24,500
15	21	20	Brian Vickers	Joe Gibbs Racing	Toyota	110	1	running	30	$25,050
16	27	79	Jeffrey Earnhardt	Go Green Racing	Ford	110	0	running	28	$24,350
17	22	4	Landon Cassill	JD Motorsports	Chevrolet	109	1	crash	0	$18,525
18	39	40	Josh Wise	The Motorsports Group	Chevrolet	109	0	crash	26	$23,975
19	36	52	Donnie Neuenberger	Jimmy Means Racing	Chevrolet	108	0	running	25	$17,850
20	33	23	Robert Richardson Jr.	R3 Motorsports	Chevrolet	107	0	running	24	$24,400
21	10	54	Joey Coulter	Joe Gibbs Racing	Toyota	104	3	crash	0	$23,550
22	15	43	Reed Sorenson	Richard Petty Motorsports	Ford	103	1	running	23	$23,400
23	23	14	Eric McClure	TriStar Motorsports	Toyota	94	0	crash	21	$23,250
24	17	33	Ty Dillon	Richard Childress Racing	Chevrolet	93	1	crash	0	$23,100
25	6	12	Sam Hornish Jr.	Penske Racing	Ford	93	0	running	19	$23,275
26	25	70	Johanna Long	ML Motorsports	Chevrolet	92	0	crash	18	$23,000
27	8	2	Brian Scott	Richard Childress Racing	Chevrolet	92	2	crash	18	$22,800
28	3	6	Trevor Bayne	Roush Fenway Racing	Ford	92	2	crash	17	$22,900
29	16	30	Nelson Piquet Jr.	Turner Scott Motorsports	Chevrolet	92	0	crash	15	$22,400
30	40	92	Tim Andrews	KH Motorsports	Ford	91	0	crash	14	$22,475
31	26	85	Bobby Gerhart	Gerhart Racing	Chevrolet	91	0	crash	13	$16,125
32	28	74	Mike Harmon	Mike Harmon Racing	Dodge	91	0	crash	12	$22,050
33	34	00	Blake Koch	SR² Motorsports	Toyota	87	0	crash	11	$22,015
34	32	44	Hal Martin	TriStar Motorsports	Toyota	84	0	running	10	$21,980
35	35	89	Morgan Shepherd	Shepherd Racing Ventures	Dodge	72	0	fuel pressure	9	$15,940
36	1	60	Travis Pastrana	Roush Fenway Racing	Ford	71	4	crash	9	$24,580
37	30	87	Joe Nemechek	NEMCO Motorsports	Toyota	64	0	running	7	$20,695
38	19	32	Kyle Larson	Turner Scott Motorsports	Chevrolet	52	0	crash	6	$20,661
39	4	34	Danica Patrick	Turner Scott Motorsports	Chevrolet	16	0	crash	0	$14,775
40	13	10	Jeff Green	TriStar Motorsports	Toyota	3	0	vibration	4	$14,425
Failed to qualify or withdrew
41		15	Stanton Barrett	Rick Ware Racing	Ford					
42		25	John Wes Townley	Venturini Motorsports	Toyota					
WD		27	David Green	SR² Motorsports	Toyota					
WD		42	J. J. Yeley	The Motorsports Group	Chevrolet					
WD		46	Chase Miller	The Motorsports Group	Chevrolet					
WD		47	Scott Riggs	The Motorsports Group	Chevrolet					
Official race results

Previous race: 2013 ToyotaCare 250	NASCAR Xfinity Series; 2013 season	Next race: 2013 VFW Sport Clips Help a Hero 200
