= Edward F. Lonergan =

American businessman

Edward F. Lonergan is an American businessman.

== Biography ==
=== Early life ===
Edward Lonergan graduated from Union College in Schenectady, New York in 1981, where he received a Bachelor of Arts degree in Political Science.

=== Career ===
From 1981 to 2002, he worked at Procter & Gamble (NYSE: PG). From May 2002 to December 2005, he served as president for the European region of The Gillette Company, a subsidiary of Procter & Gamble. From 2006 to 2011, he served as president and CEO of Diversey, Inc., a manufacturer of cleaning and hygiene products which became a subsidiary of Sealed Air (NYSE: SEE) in 2011.

From October 2012 to January 2015, he served as president and CEO of Chiquita Brands International (NYSE: CQB), a publicly traded corporation which is the leading distributor of bananas in the United States. He replaced former CEO Fernando Aguirre.

Since August 2015, he has served as chairman of Zep, Inc., a New Mountain Capital company. He also serves on the board of directors of Commercial Markets Holdco and Owens Corning (NYSE: OC), the world's largest manufacturer of fiberglass.

=== Personal life ===
He is married with two adult children.
