= Rain-X =

Brand of automotive surface care products

- Product type: Automotive aftermarket in glass care; other car care: car washes, waxes, bug and tar removers, and headlight restoration kits.
- Current owner: ITW Global Brands, division of Illinois Tool Works (ITW)
- Introduced: 1972
- Previous owners: Pennzoil-Quaker State Company dba SOPUS Products
- Tagline: "Outsmart the elements"
- Website: rainx.com

Rain-X is a synthetic hydrophobic surface-applied product that causes water to bead up and run off surfaces, most commonly used on glass automobile surfaces. The brand has since been extended to a range of automotive and surface care products, including wiper blades.

== Products ==
The Rain-X brand includes seven categories of products: wiper blades, glass and windshield treatments, plastic cleaners, windshield washer fluid, car washes, car wax, and bug and tar washes.

Rain-X Online Protectant was introduced to commercial carwashes in 2005. It is a water-based compound that is applied to the entire car's surface, working much like consumer grade Rain-X products.

Competing products include Pittsburgh Glass Works' (formerly of PPG) Aquapel. Rain X wiper blades have the highest market share in North America.

== Uses ==
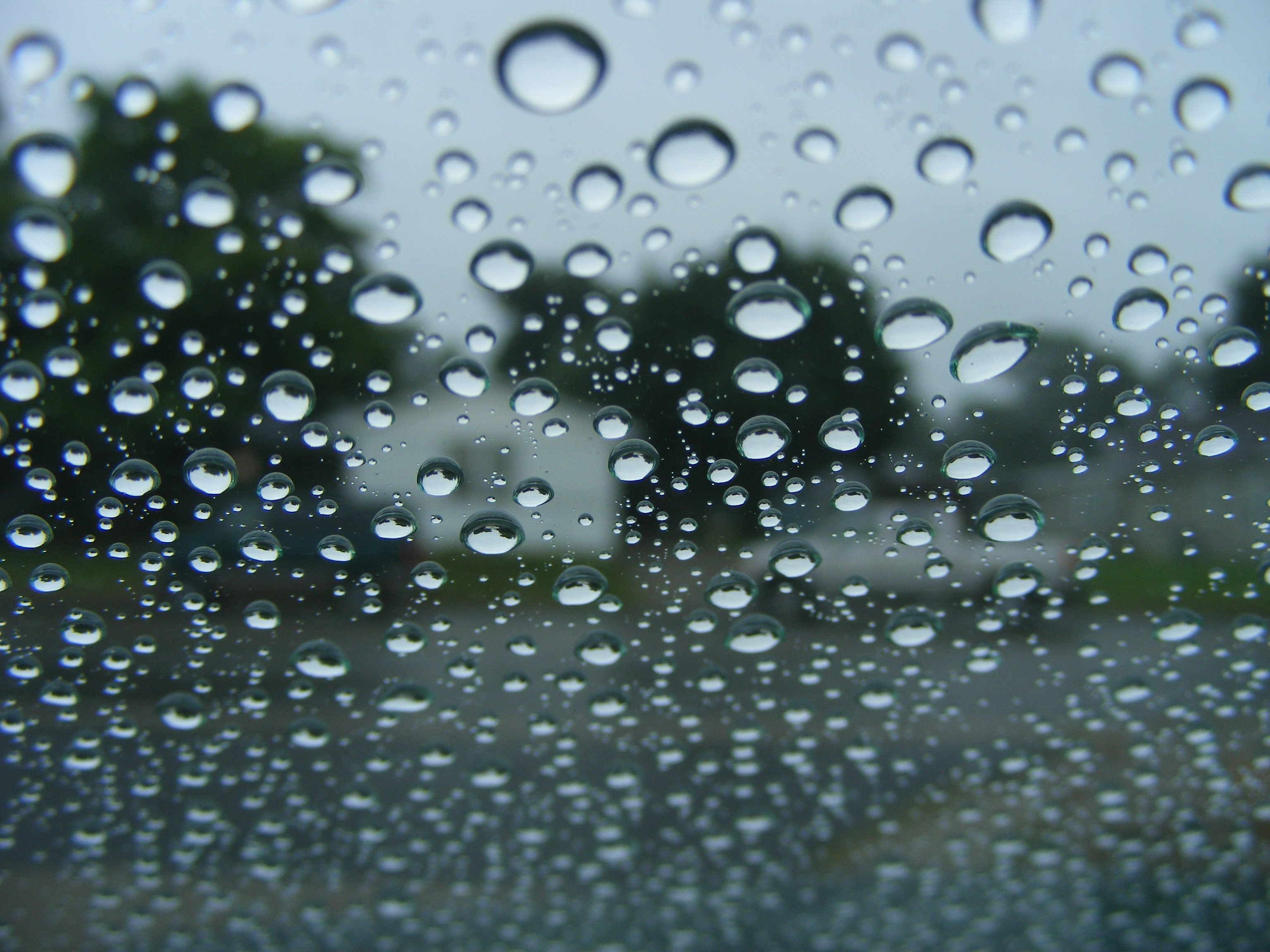
Effect of Rain-X original on a glass surface

Due to its general water-repellent properties, the original Rain-X formulation is used in a wide variety of consumer, commercial and industrial settings. The primary use of Rain-X is for automotive applications. Commercially sold "Original Glass Treatment" is the original and most well known Rain-X branded product. It is a hydrophobic silicone polymer that forces water to bead and roll off of the car, often without needing wipers. It is sold in bottles of 3.5 or 7 US fluid ounces (100 or 210 ml), or as wipes or towelettes.

The original coating has also had use in military and other government settings. The Australian military examined the effect of application of Rain-X and similar products to submarine antennas to improve signal transmission, although other coatings had longer lifespans when submerged in salt water.

It is also occasionally used in laboratory settings to silanise a surface.

Ski and snowboard enthusiasts use Rain-X as "wax" to effectively overcome sticky wet snow common in spring conditions. While skiing or riding on mountains with hard snow pack, the heat of the sun changes snow conditions starting on the lower slopes. Skis may suddenly slow down, throwing one off-balance, because of a change in surface tension, a sort of "sandpaper effect." Rain-X is applied to the ski or board base, or to the bottoms of ski boots to reduce, or eliminate snow "wedges" that interfere with proper mounting into ski bindings.

== Chemistry ==
Rain-X's primary active ingredient are polysiloxanes, the primary one being hydroxy-terminated polydimethylsiloxane. The polysiloxanes have functional groups that bind to the hydroxyl group of the glass surface. Rain-X submitted safety documents which state that the solvent used is a mix of acetone and water, but the exact ratio is a trade secret.

== History and ownership ==
Rain-X was introduced in 1972 by Howard G. Ohlhausen of the Unelko Corporation. The product was originally registered as a trademark in 1972 by Unelko, and was sold to Quaker State in 1997.

Between 1997 and 2011, Rain-X was marketed by SOPUS Products, a subsidiary of Pennzoil-Quaker State, itself a subsidiary of Royal Dutch Shell. On 1 March 2011, Illinois Tool Works acquired SOPUS's car care business.

In the UK, prior to 2010, Rain-X branded products were distributed by the SOPUS subsidiary Auto Expressions. On 9 June 2010, Kraco Enterprises acquired the company.

Industrial Rain-X products were produced by Ecolab and used in carwashes and other industrial applications. Ecolab sold its vehicle care business to Zep, Inc. on 1 December 2012. The sale also included the Armor All Professional, Black Magic, Blue Coral, Niagara National, Washtronics, and Zep Enviroedge brands.

Rain-X (retail products) was purchased by Illinois Tool Works, from Shell Oil Company, on 3/1/2011. Today, Rain-X is part of ITW Global Brands division.
