= AviChina Industry & Technology =

Chinese aviation company

AviChina Industry & Technology Company Limited
- Native name: 中国航空科技工业股份有限公司
- Type: Public subsidiary
- Traded as: SEHK: 2357
- Industry: Aviation
- Founded: 30 April 2003; 23 years ago
- Headquarters: Beijing, China
- Key people: Yan Lingxi (Chairman); Sun Jizhong (CEO)
- Revenue: ▲CN¥84.73 billion (2023)
- Net income: ▲CN¥6.69 billion (2023)
- Total assets: ▲CN¥185.02 billion (2023)
- Total equity: ▲CN¥88.06 billion (2023)
- Owner: Aviation Industry Corporation of China
- Number of employees: 74,584 (2023)
- Parent: Aviation Industry Corporation of China
- Subsidiaries: AVIC Jonhon Optronic Technology
- Website: www.avichina.com

AviChina Industry & Technology (AviChina; Chinese: 中航科工; pinyin: Zhōngháng Kēgōng) is a partially state-owned publicly listed aviation company headquartered in Beijing. It primarily is involved with aircraft manufacturing, supplying aviation Ancillary Systems and providing aviation engineering services.

The company is a subsidiary of the Aviation Industry Corporation of China (AVIC).

== Background ==
AviChina was established on 30 April 2003. It was previously the civil unit of China Aviation Industry Corporation II. As of 2003 it was the largest minicar maker in China with a 41 percent market share as well as the only domestic mass producer of helicopters and regional jets in China. Although the car business made up 80% of its revenue in the previous year it expected its aircraft assembly business to drive future growth. AviChina held 49 percent of a joint venture with Embraer to build jets in China. It also had partnerships with Sikorsky Aircraft and Eurocopter to make helicopters

On 30 October 2003, AviChina held its initial public offering becoming a listed company on the Hong Kong Stock Exchange. It raised US$247 million.

For 2007, AviChina reported a loss of 1.03 billion yuan due to a bigger deficit at its vehicle division and decline in margins at its helicopter unit. Its vehicle division consisted of two units, Hafei Automobile and Changhe. In 2009, AviChina became a purely aeronautical company after it sold Hafei to its parent AVIC in exchange for its avionics electronics business and spin-off Changhe. In 2010, AviChina management said it intended to gradually buy all of its parent's aviation equipment operations.

In April 2018, Bloomberg News reported that AviChina was one of the best performing stocks in Asia. From the start of February to April it had risen 40% which put it at the top of the MSCI Asia Pacific Index that fell more than 6 percent in that time. Due to tensions in China–United States relations there was renewed investors' interest in Chinese defense stocks. Its military revenue outpaced profits from general-purpose lightweight aircraft used for cargo transport and crop seeding. Airbus was a significant shareholder with a 11.7% stake.

In September 2024, Airbus faced negative press attention over its ties to AviChina. In a joint report, NGOs Justice for Myanmar and Info Birmanie outlined how the supplied aircraft and weapons were used to hit civilian targets and called on Airbus to use its influence to pressure the Chinese firm to end its arms sales to the Myanmar junta.

In June 2025, Justice for Myanmar reported that Airbus had completed its divestment from AviChina by 1 April 2025. Two years earlier, in January 2023, Norway's sovereign wealth fund, Norges Bank Investment Management said it had divested from AviChina for selling light aeroplanes to military junta-ruled Myanmar.

== See also ==
- Aviation Industry Corporation of China
- Hafei
- Changhe
- Airbus
