= AVIC Jonhon Optronic Technology =

Chinese electronics company

AVIC Jonhon Optronic Technology Co., Ltd.
- Native name: 中航光电科技股份有限公司
- Formerly: China Aviation Optical-Electrical Technology
- Company type: Public subsidiary
- Traded as: SZSE: 002179; CSI Midcap 200
- Industry: Electronics
- Founded: 1970; 56 years ago
- Headquarters: Luoyang, Henan China
- Key people: Guo Zeyi (Chairman); Li Sen (CEO)
- Revenue: ▲CN¥20.07 billion (2023)
- Net income: ▲CN¥3.54 billion (2023)
- Total assets: ▲CN¥35.57 billion (2023)
- Total equity: ▲CN¥22.02 billion (2023)
- Owner: AviChina Industry & Technology (36.73%)
- Number of employees: 17,679 (2023)
- Parent: AviChina Industry & Technology
- Subsidiaries: AVIC Forstar S&T
- Website: www.jonhon.cn

AVIC Jonhon Optronic Technology (Jonhon; Chinese: 中航光电; pinyin: Zhōngháng Guāngdiàn) is a partially state-owned publicly listed electronics company headquartered in Luoyang, Henan. It primarily engages in the development and sale of electrical connectors, optical devices, and cable components.

The company is a subsidiary of AviChina Industry & Technology.

== Background ==
In 1970 during the Third Front, the predecessor of Jonhon was established as an electronics factory in Yichuan County, Henan that produced aviation bolts for the Chinese military. After the reform and opening up that opened up China in 1980, the country focused on the economy and the factory which relied on producing military products struggled. The factory spent years gathering capital mainly from loans to move to Luoyang City.

In 1991, the factory moved to Luoyang and focused on producing electrical connectors, optical fiber connectors and other products for cvillian usage. In 1995 it passed the ISO 9001 standard. Afterwards the factory's business expanded rapidly. In 2002 with China Aviation Industry Corporation I as the initiator along with six other units, the factory was restructured to become a joint-stock company named China Aviation Optical-Electrical Technology.

In 2007, the company held its initial public offering becoming a listed company on the Shenzhen Stock Exchange. It was the first company in China related to national defense to become a publicly listed.

In 2012, the company along with Hisense Broadband formed AVIC Hisense Photoelectric Technology (now known as Qingdao Xinghang Photoelectric Technology) to expand the fiber optic connector business. In 2013, it acquired 48.18% stake in Xian Forstar S&T (now AVIC Forstar S&T) which is currently listed on the Beijing Stock Exchange. In 2015, it established a joint venture named AVIC Optoelectronics Precision to produce precision connectors.

On 6 July 2016, the company changed its name to AVIC Jonhon Optronic Technology Co., Ltd.

On 4 June 2021, US president Joe Biden signed Executive Order 14032 that listed 59 Chinese companies that are to be banned from receiving U.S. investments. Jonhon was one of the companies on the list.

== See also ==
- Aviation Industry Corporation of China
