= Campus Conservation Nationals =

Campus Conservation Nationals (CCN) is a national competition in which colleges and universities in North America compete to reduce energy and water consumption over the course of a month. Participating schools aim to educate students and faculty about resource consumption and its effects on the environment. The program is run by the U.S. Green Building Council (USGBC), Lucid Design Group, the National Wildlife Federation, and the Alliance to Save Energy. The competition lasts for three weeks, and each individual school may choose when to hold their competition during CCN's three-month competition season each spring. Campuses can hold individual competitions, which involves campus buildings competing to have the highest reduction (by percent) of electricity and/or water compared to a previously-set baseline. Many campuses also participate in a group competition, competing against other schools in their region. Campus Conservation Nationals 2015 marks the fifth year of the competition. Recent years' competitions resulted in an overall energy savings of over 2 million kWh each year. The first pilot competition was held in 2010, with the program resulting in 500,000 kWh of energy saved. DePauw University was the winner of the 2010 competition

== Procedures and methods ==
Colleges and universities across the United States and Canada sign up to participate in the CCN competition in the fall. The CCN website provides "How To" guides and checklists for organizing teams to plan their individual programming and competitions. The schools are responsible for designing and running their own events, with support from Campus Conservation Nationals and Lucid. They choose the campus buildings whose electricity and/or water data they want to collect. This data is monitored by meters in the buildings, collected by or input into Lucid's BuildingOS, then represented visually on Building Dashboard. Lucid Design Group provides its software to give schools a way to visualize and keep track of their resource usage.

Each college or university holds its own three-week competition. Various campus buildings will compete against one another to provide incentive for students to reduce their energy and/or water consumption. The goal is for students to see how changing their behavior can make a difference. The organizing team at each school plans its own set of marketing strategies and competition events to spread awareness. In addition to holding the national competition, CCN also holds a poster competition for the "most innovative outreach poster" used in their campaigns. Throughout the competitions, data can be viewed by all students on their school's Building Dashboard page, which shows each campus building's energy consumption across different time scales, the percent reduction in energy consumption so far, and more. At the end of the national competition run, from February to April, the data from every participating school is compared.

== Past competitions ==
=== 2012 ===
In 2012, 94 colleges and universities in North America participated in the Campus Conservation Nationals program, and 1.7 million kWh of electricity were saved in total. This equals a savings of about $160,000 in energy costs, and it prevented about 2.6 million pounds of CO_{2}from entering the atmosphere. Only six campuses were competing in the national competition. The five schools with the greatest percent of electricity reduction were Bowling Green State University, Hofstra University, South Connecticut State University, University of Kentucky, and Western Technical College.

=== 2013 ===
The 2013 competition of Campus Conservation Nationals saw 120 participating colleges and universities. 2,115,000 kWh of electricity were saved in total by all of the participants. This is the amount of energy that would be saved if 187 U.S. homes were taken off of the power grid for a year. 1,680,000 gallons of water were saved during the competition as well. The top five schools who reduced the electricity consumption the most were Harvey Mudd College, Northwest Missouri State University, Oregon State University, St. John's University, and University of North Carolina at Chapel Hill. Cal Poly Pomona, Indiana University, Northwestern University, Oberlin College, and Wake Forest University were the top five schools for Greatest Overall Percent Reduction in Water Use.

=== 2014 ===
109 colleges and universities participated in the 2014 College Conservation Nationals competition. Over 2.2 million kWh of electricity were saved in total. That is equal to preventing 3 million pounds of carbon dioxide from entering the atmosphere. 476,000 gallons of water were also saved in the 2014 competition. The top ten schools for largest campus-wide electricity reduction were Appalachian State University, Bard College, Berea College, Cal State Chico, Dickinson College, Louisiana State University, Loyola University Maryland, Portland State University, Wake Forest University, and Western Carolina University. 2014 saw many repeat schools who were making this event a tradition on their campuses.

== Building Dashboard ==
Building Dashboard is Lucid Design Group's online interface that helps organizations track their building's energy and water consumption. It provides real-time feedback of this data, to help convince inhabitants that their behavior change creates results. The energy usage is measured in kilowatt-hours. The interactive website features graphs that illustrate energy usage for every metered building on a university's campus. The settings can be changed to display energy usage over a certain time period: the month, the week, or the day. If a competition is happening, students can view which campus building has saved the most energy thus far on their school's main Building Dashboard page. The site allows the public to view the statistics in terms of monetary savings, CO_{2}emissions, and more.

== See also ==
- Conservation movement
- Efficient energy use
- Energy conservation
- Green buildings
- Sustainable consumption
- Water conservation
