= WESCO International =

Holding company

Wesco International, Inc.
- Logo used since 2022
- Formerly: Westinghouse Electrical Supply Company
- Type: Public
- Traded as: NYSE: WCC; S&P 400 component
- Industry: Maintenance; Repair; Operations
- Founded: 1922; 104 years ago
- Headquarters: Pittsburgh, Pennsylvania, U.S.
- Area served: Worldwide
- Key people: John Engel (chairman and CEO)
- Products: Electronic instruments & controls
- Revenue: ▲US$8.177 billion (2018); ▲US$7.679 billion (2017)
- Operating income: ▲US$353 million (2018); ▼US$319 million (2017)
- Net income: ▲US$225 million (2018); ▲US$163 million (2017)
- Total assets: ▼US$4.605 billion (2018); ▲US$4.736 billion (2017)
- Total equity: ▲US$2.130 billion (2018); ▲US$2.116 billion (2017)
- Number of employees: 20,000 (2022)
- Website: wesco.com
- Footnotes: Financials; Employees

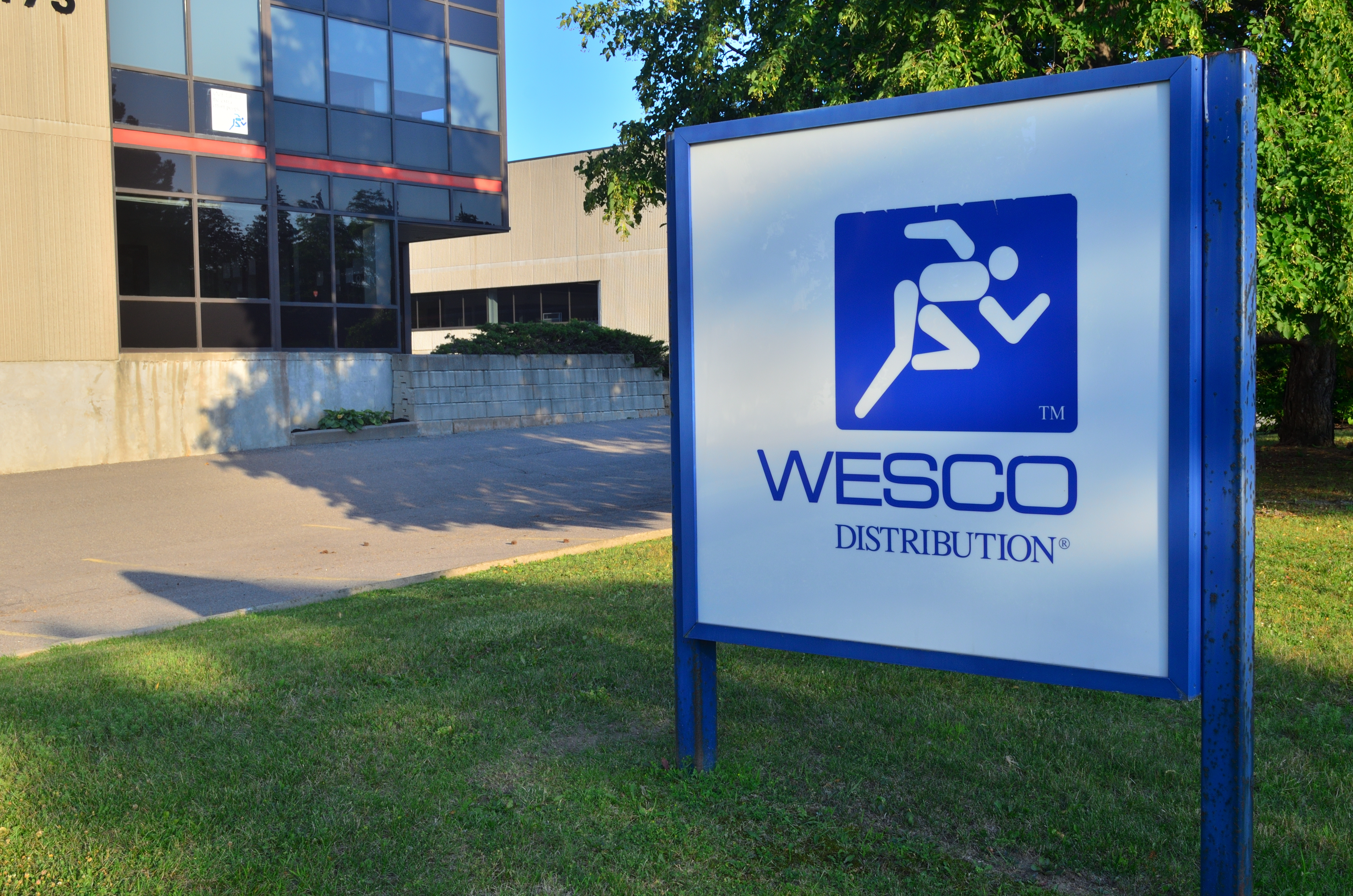
Wesco office in Canada

Wesco International, Inc. is a publicly traded American holding company for Wesco Distribution, an electrical distribution and services company based in Pittsburgh, Pennsylvania.

Wesco International, Inc. provides electrical, industrial, communications, maintenance, repair, and operating (MRO), original equipment manufacturer (OEM) products, construction materials, and shipping. In 2023, its total revenue was approximately $22 billion. The company employs approximately 20,000 employees and 30,000 suppliers to serve more than 150,000 active customers worldwide. Wesco customers include commercial and industrial businesses, contractors, government agencies, institutions, telecommunications providers, and utilities. Wesco operates ten fully automated distribution centers and 500 branches in North American and international markets.

== History ==
Wesco Distribution was formed in 1922 as a subsidiary of the Westinghouse Electric Corporation, a company also based in Pittsburgh. It served as the Westinghouse subsidiary charged with selling and distributing company components in the electrical and industrial industries. Wesco maintained close ties to its parent.

In 1994, the private equity firm Clayton, Dubilier & Rice (CD&R) purchased Westinghouse Electrical Supply Company and created Wesco Distribution Inc.

In June 1998, CD&R sold Wesco to The Cypress Group for USD 1.1 billion, which formed WESCO International Inc., the current owner of Wesco Distribution.

In the same year, Wesco acquired the Bruckner Supply Company Inc., a provider of integrated supply management solutions and MRO products to Fortune 500 customers.

On May 12, 1999, Wesco held its initial public offering on the New York Stock Exchange

In 2008, the company was recognized for "environmentally sustainable business practices" through an Environmental Stewardship Award from Veolia ES Technical Solutions.

== Acquisitions ==
In 2005, Wesco acquired the Carlton-Bates Company, a provider of original equipment products and supply solutions to industrial customers. In the same year, Forbes magazine named Wesco as one of their 400 Best Big Companies, an honor which was received again in 2006, 2007, and 2009.

In 2006, Wesco acquired the Communication Supply Corporation, a national distributor of data communications products for enterprise and data center customers.

In November 2010 the company acquired TVC Communications.

In 2010, Wesco acquired Calgary, Alberta based Brews Supply Ltd.

In 2012, Wesco acquired EECOL Electric Corp.

In June 2012, the company acquired Conney Safety Products, LLC.

In 2014, Wesco acquired Hazmasters Inc.

In 2015, Wesco acquired Hill Country Electric Supply, Aelux, and Needham Electric Supply.

In 2016, Wesco acquired Atlanta Electrical Distributors, LLC.

In 2019, Wesco acquired OSRAM's Sylvania Lighting Solutions (SLS), now known as Wesco Energy Solutions.

On January 13, 2020, Wesco agreed to acquire Anixter. In November 2021, Wesco changed its logo as part of the post-merger integration with Anixter.

On September 7, 2022, Wesco agreed to acquire Rahi Systems.

On December 6, 2024, Wesco acquired Ascent, LLC.

== Executive officers ==
- John J. Engel – chairman, President & CEO
- David S. Schulz – Executive Vice President & Chief Financial Officer
- Diane E. Lazzaris – Executive Vice President & General Counsel
- Christine A. Wolf – Executive Vice President & Chief Human Resources Officer
- Theodore A. Dosch – Executive Vice President, Strategy & Chief Transformation Officer
- Nelson J. Squires III – Executive Vice President & General Manager, Electrical & Electronic Solutions
- William Clayton Geary II – Executive Vice President & General Manager, Communications & Security Solutions
- James Cameron – Executive Vice President & General Manager, Utility & Broadband Solutions
- Hemant Porwal – Executive Vice President, Supply Chain & Operations
- Roy W. Haley – Former Chairman, President & CEO 05/1998 - 09/2009; Former CEO 02/1994 - 05/1998
- Akash Khurana - CDIO

== Board of directors ==
- John J. Engel – Chairman, President, and CEO
- Matthew J. Espe – Operating Partner of Advent International
- Bobby J. Griffin – Former President, International Operations of Ryder System, Inc.
- John K. Morgan – Former Chairman, President & CEO of Zep, Inc.
- Steven A. Raymund – Former Chairman & CEO of Tech Data Corporation
- James L. Singleton – Chairman & CEO of Cürex Group Holdings, LLC
- Easwaran Sundaram – Executive VP and Chief Digital & Technology Officer of JetBlue Airways Corporation
- Lynn M. Utter – Principal and Chief Talent Officer, Atlas Holdings
- Laura K. Thompson – Former Executive Vice President of The Goodyear Tire & Rubber Company.
