= Align Aerospace =

Aerospace Company

- Company type: Private company
- Industry: Aerospace and Distribution
- Founded: 1972
- Headquarters: Chatsworth, California
- Area served: Worldwide
- Key people: Jerome DeTruchis, CEO; Ian Cohen, CFO; Gavin Rao, Sr VP – China; Matt Connor, VP – Sales & Marketing; Marc Invernizzi GM – France
- Products: Fasteners
- Number of employees: 350
- Website: www.alignaero.com

Align Aerospace, formerly Anixter Aerospace Hardware and Anixter Pentacon, is a supplier of fasteners, seals, bearings, and related components to aerospace and defense original equipment manufacturers and their subcontractors. Align is headquartered in Chatsworth, California, with European sales and operations office in Collegien, France.

The company was founded in 1972 and has been working in the aerospace and defense industry for the duration of its history.

== Ownership ==
In August 2011, Align was sold by Anixter International (NYSE: AXE), based in Glenview, Illinois, to the private equity firm Greenbriar Equity. In March 2015, AVIC International acquired Align Aerospace from Greenbriar.
