= Orange County Choppers bikes =

Motorcycles on a TV series

Orange County Choppers bikes are motorcycles featured on the television series American Chopper built by Orange County Choppers (OCC) for a specific corporate or celebrity customer. Theme bikes are motorcycles in which the theme of the motorcycle takes priority over everything else, influencing the frame dimensions, paint scheme, and overall 'feel' of the motorcycle. The function of motorcycle usually takes a backseat to the presentation of the theme, and these motorcycles attract attention solely on the premise of the theme itself. Customer bikes are built for and generally to the specifications of a particular customer. Although the customers typically give OCC creative freedom to do what they will, some clients have a specific idea in mind and expect OCC to reproduce their mental picture literally.

Customers use the bikes for promotional purposes at tradeshows or auction them off as a charity fundraiser.

== Overview ==
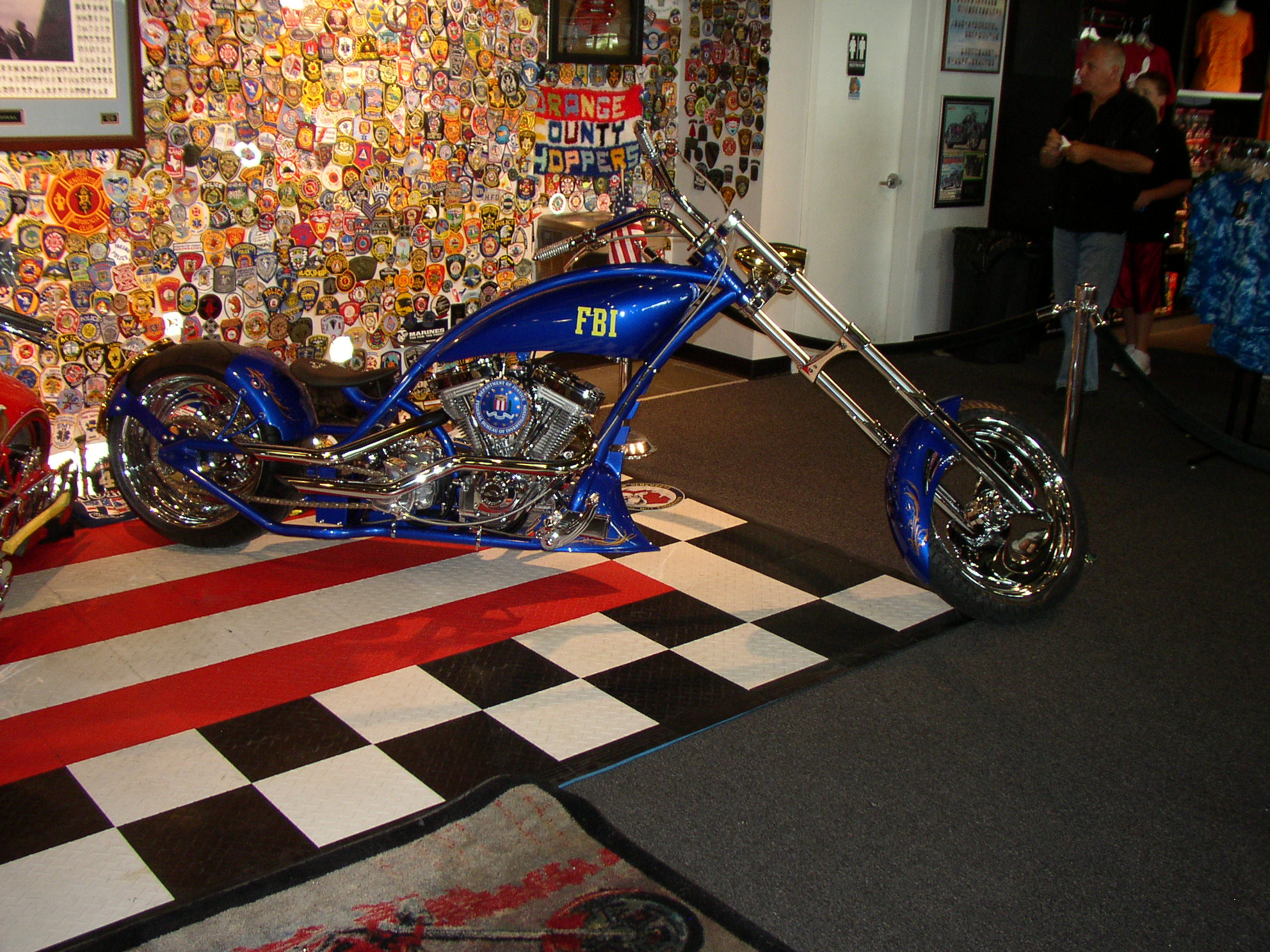
OCC custom motorcycle "FBI"

OCC was in the business of building custom motorcycles for individuals before it gained fame building themed projects or was featured on television. OCC has returned to that business while incorporating some of the designs that made them famous. The "Web" production bike is inspired by the "Black Widow" theme bike and other bikes which have incorporated spider webs into the design. The Greeny is an old-school style chopper designed by Paul Senior. The OCC Original includes many of the design elements that have made OCC famous including the heavy frame, wide back tire and wide rake on the front forks. The splitback features a unique split gas tank originally conceived from theme bikes on the show. A T-Rex Softail and a T-Rex Rigid were also available in the production series in the past.

Paul Senior's love of the style led him to create a number of old-school style choppers including: "10-Up Old School", "Greeny", "Maroon and Gold", "Orange Bobber", "The Blue Bomber", "Little Red", "Old School Vette", "Orange Knucklehead", "Pitchfork", "Triumph Flames", and "Sunshine". The "Greeny" model is available for purchase from the production series.

In recognition of the show's growing fanbase, a contest was held to select fans which would receive custom built bikes. Winners were visited by the designers and asked to describe their dream bike. Winners include Jeff Clegg's "Corporal Punishment", Susan Morisset's "Female Snake Bike", Joseph McClendon's "Custom Hog", and Bryan King's "Vertebrae Trike".

== List of theme bikes ==
=== Black Widow Bike ===
Season 1, Episodes 1&2 Original Airdates 03/31/03 04/07/03
Paul Teutul Jr. was the primary designer and fabricator on this bike. The "Black Widow Bike" was the bike central to the first two episodes of American Chopper. This bike was the first sign to fans of the show of Paul Jr.'s obsession with spiders and spider webs as well as the capabilities of OCC. This was also the first bike Vinny and Paul Jr. worked on together.

As of 2025, the Black Widow Bike is now in possession of PJD at the Paul Jr. Designs showroom.

=== Fire Bike ===
Season 1, Episodes 5,6,&7, Original Airdates 04/28/03 06/02/03 06/09/03

The "Fire Bike" was created by everyone at OCC, the project holding more emotional weight with its ties to the 9/11 terrorist attacks. It was, as Paul Teutul Sr. put it, "not just an Orange County Chopper, it's a New York City Chopper." This bike follows Orange County Choppers around to most of their shows and is consistently a big hit.

The chopper was built as a tribute to the firefighters who died in the World Trade Center disaster on September 11, 2001. The custom paint job features the number "343" on the rear fender, representing the number of firefighters who died while saving civilians that day. It also features, as the very last part attached to the bike, a piece of steel that was recovered from Ground Zero. Paul Jr. welded the piece, which resembles a large rivet with the end opposite the head very jagged, onto a bracket made from diamond plate which was then attached to a cavity on top of the gas tank. This was done when the bike was presented to the firemen at one of the New York fire stations at the end of the episode.

During the "New York Jets Bike" episode, the "Fire Bike" was damaged during a highway accident. It was the New York City Fire Department that arrived to help and took special care in recovering the bike which was later repaired.

Though they are never mentioned nor alluded to in these episodes, some fire departments actually do use motorcycles, but they are not custom choppers. They are generally based on stock touring bikes and trail bikes, and are used to get to the scene of the fire more quickly in congested cities, but may also carry medical supplies and some light firefighting equipment.

As of 2025, the Fire Bike is still on possession of OCC at the OCC Road House & Museum.

=== Cody's old school project ===
Season 1, Episodes 8&9 Original Airdates 06/16/03 06/30/03
Based around a Harley Davidson replica frame, the Old School Chopper has an 88-cubic-inch (1,440 cc) pan head motor that delivers 40 horsepower (30 kW) through a chain drive to the back wheel. It also features a springer front end, sportster style tank, old style ape hanger handlebars and Jockey shift/Suicide clutch. Detailing includes a deep maroon paint job and gold-leaf accenting. Most of the fabrication on this bike was done by OCC's former student intern, Cody Connelly, as a joint project with Paul Sr. Despite the bike being presented to Connelly at the end of the episode, it was later returned to OCC and became the subject of a lawsuit claim by Connelly.

As of 2025, the status of this chopper is unknown.

=== Comanche Bike ===
Season 1, Episodes 9,10&11 Original Airdates 06/30/03 07/14/03
Designed and fabricated by Paul Teutul Jr., the bike was inspired by the RAH-66 Comanche Helicopter. The "Comanche Bike" was debuted at an event in Myrtle Beach, South Carolina which saw the Teutuls and Vincent DiMartino fly in on a Bell 206 helicopter, an entrance which required major set-up and timing. Earlier in the day Vinnie had started the bike only to have the engine spin a bearing. The engine's original builder, Joe from H&M Motors flew to SC and with others from the OCC Crew attempted to fix the massive problems with the engine, with a very nervous Vinnie having to leave to join the Teutul's on the helicopter before the problems were fixed. In the last seconds (quite literally), the crew got the bike started up, and released it to the public with great success.

As of 2025, the Comanche Bike is still on possession of OCC at the OCC Road House & Museum.

=== Mikey's Blues Bike ===
Season 1, Episodes 12&13 Original Airdates 08/11/03 08/18/03
Mike Teutul made his entrance into the world of custom bike building with this blues-themed chopper "Mikey's Bike". Originally to be helped by his brother, Paul Teutul Jr., he eventually grows fed up with his brother's lack of assistance on the project and enlists various members of the Orange County Choppers staff. The wheels were spoked with gold spokes and their inside edges muraled with musical notes. In addition, all along the bike are painted images representative of various famous bluesmen such as B. B. King, Robert Johnson, Taj Mahal, Tom Waits, and Gatemouth Brown.

As of 2025, it was assumed by Paul Jr. and Mikey Teutul that the bike had been scrapped down and repurposed and no longer exists.

=== Christmas Bike ===
Season 1, Holiday Episode Original Airdates 12/22/03
The "Christmas Bike" had a special rarely seen father/son build team of Mikey and Paul Sr. who came together in this Season 2 episode Santa Claus' sleigh as a chopper.

In this build the father and son team focused more on superficial factors like the antlers, paint job, and sleigh look as opposed to the power of the engine or electronics. Although not as serious of a technical episode as some are, the "Christmas Bike" episode ended on a nice note with Paul Sr. and Mikey entertaining some kids with their new creation. The main members of the build were Sr., Mikey, Rick Petko, and Mike Campo. All would regroup for the Santa's Sleigh the following year.

As of 2025, the Christmas Bike is still on possession of OCC at the OCC Road House & Museum.

=== POW/MIA Bike ===
Season 1, Episodes 17,18,&19 Original Airdates 01/12/04 01/19/04 01/26/04
During the bike show at the Javits Center in New York where the Black Widow Bike was unveiled, Paul Sr. met two Vietnam War veterans. An idea brewed in Paul's mind for several months before deciding to make the POW/MIA Bike centered around the POW/MIAs of the Vietnam War. The entire American Chopper gang made a trip to Washington D.C. and visited the Vietnam Memorial Wall, Rick Petko even taking a rubbing his mother's cousin whose name was on the wall. In a rare turn of events, Paul Sr. took charge of the project, as opposed to his son, as Senior felt a closer tie to the veterans from his generation. Senior took Mike Teutul, Cody Connelly, Rick Petko, and Mike Campo into the crew for the bike. The bike featured massive custom fabrication on nearly every piece with Rick enlarging the tank and Campo cutting the POW/MIA logo into the rear fender as well as sculpting a 3D metal spade which was incorporated into the sissy bar. The crew incorporated the phrase "POW/MIA" and the POW/MIA logo wherever they could. They even bought a custom Jeri Springer front end with POW/MIA memorabilia embedded in the metal.

On September 22, 2008, The Teutuls and Mikey had presented a POW/MIA chopper to Senator John McCain at a rally in Media, Pennsylvania.

As of 2025, the POW/MIA Bike is still on possession of OCC at the OCC Road House & Museum.

=== Mikey/Vinnie's Bike ===
Season 2, Episode 28 and 29, original airdates 06/07/2004 06/14/2004
Because of scheduling conflicts, Paul Sr and Paul Jr were called away on other business just as production on the new season was set to begin. As a result, Mikey and Vinnie were given free rein to create the Mikey/Vinnie Bike. In a first for OCC, Vinnie opted for a V series [twin-cam] engine modified to 103 ci with 110 horsepower (82 kW). The bike's most revolutionary innovation is its one sided soft tail frame. The unusual swing arm required a drastic adjustment to its transmission offset. A mural of Mikey giving Vinnie a bear hug complements the rear fender. Difficulties in starting the bike up during its public unveiling plagued the project. They were fixed later, when Vinnie discussed the issues with Harley and was told they had the wrong push rods. After the push rods were changed, all issues with the motor were resolved. The bike was later torn down and turned into a customer bike. Vinny still has the suicide shifter at his shop after it was given to him by Christian while tearing it down.

As of 2025, the Mikey/Vinnie bike was confirmed as being torn down and sold as a normal production chopper. Vinnie owns parts of the bike that were given to him by Christian.

=== Lance Armstrong ===
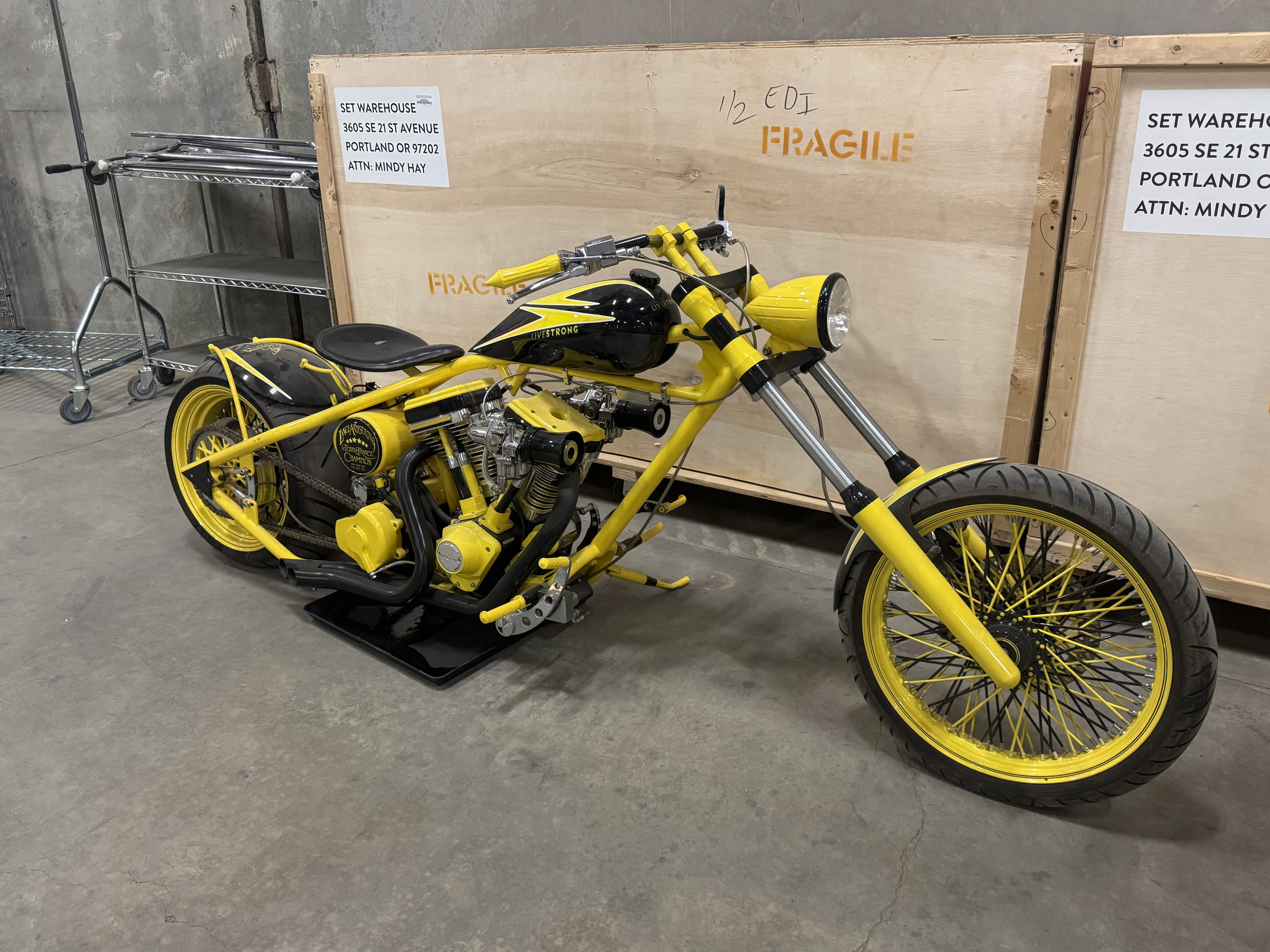
OCC “Lance Armstrong”

After a visit to Nike headquarters, the American Chopper crew set out to build a bike honoring seven-time winner of the Tour de France, Lance Armstrong, and his Lance Armstrong Foundation. Numerous custom parts were fabricated, including a prominent cover plate with 5 stars to symbolize Lance's 5 Tour de France victories, which had to be altered when he won his 6th. The fuel tank uses the shape and design of Lance's riding helmet, and its paint scheme is the yellow and black of the Livestrong Foundation. Lance has come back to do a television commercial for future seasons of American Chopper. In the commercial he races back to his hotel room, hears the whirring of buzzing metalwork behind the door, and finds the Teutuls (Mikey, Junior, and Senior) with his newly choppered bike

As of June 2025, the chopper sits in a Nike warehouse in Beaverton, OR.

=== I, Robot Bike ===
I, Robot star Will Smith visited Orange County Choppers to share his view of how the bike should look. Orange County Choppers used exclusive development artwork and sketches of the robots provided by the film's producers to lay out a sleek, futuristic, robotic looking bike. Finally, the Teutuls presented the bike in a red carpet affair for the premiere of I, Robot. This bike also makes an appearance in the American Chopper 2: Full Throttle video game, though is referred to as the "Future Bike".

As of 2025, the status of this chopper is unknown.

=== Junior's Dream Bike ===
It is the third in a series of "web-themed" bikes conceived and designed by Paul Teutul Jr. The bike is covered front to back with cold rolled round bar webbing, each section of the bike has an individually tailored piece of webbing. The bike is notable for having a "ghost tank" in place of a gas tank, using webbing built in the shape of a gas tank. (A small gas tank was built into the oil tank in front of the rear wheel.) Vinny DiMartino constructed the headlight, Junior made the rear fender, webbed scoop and the ghost tank, where Rick Petko created the oil tank and the gas tank/fender. Another feature was the seat, which Junior made out of webbing with no padding as per normal.

As of 2025, Junior's Dream Bike is still on possession of OCC at the OCC Road House & Museum.

=== Others ===
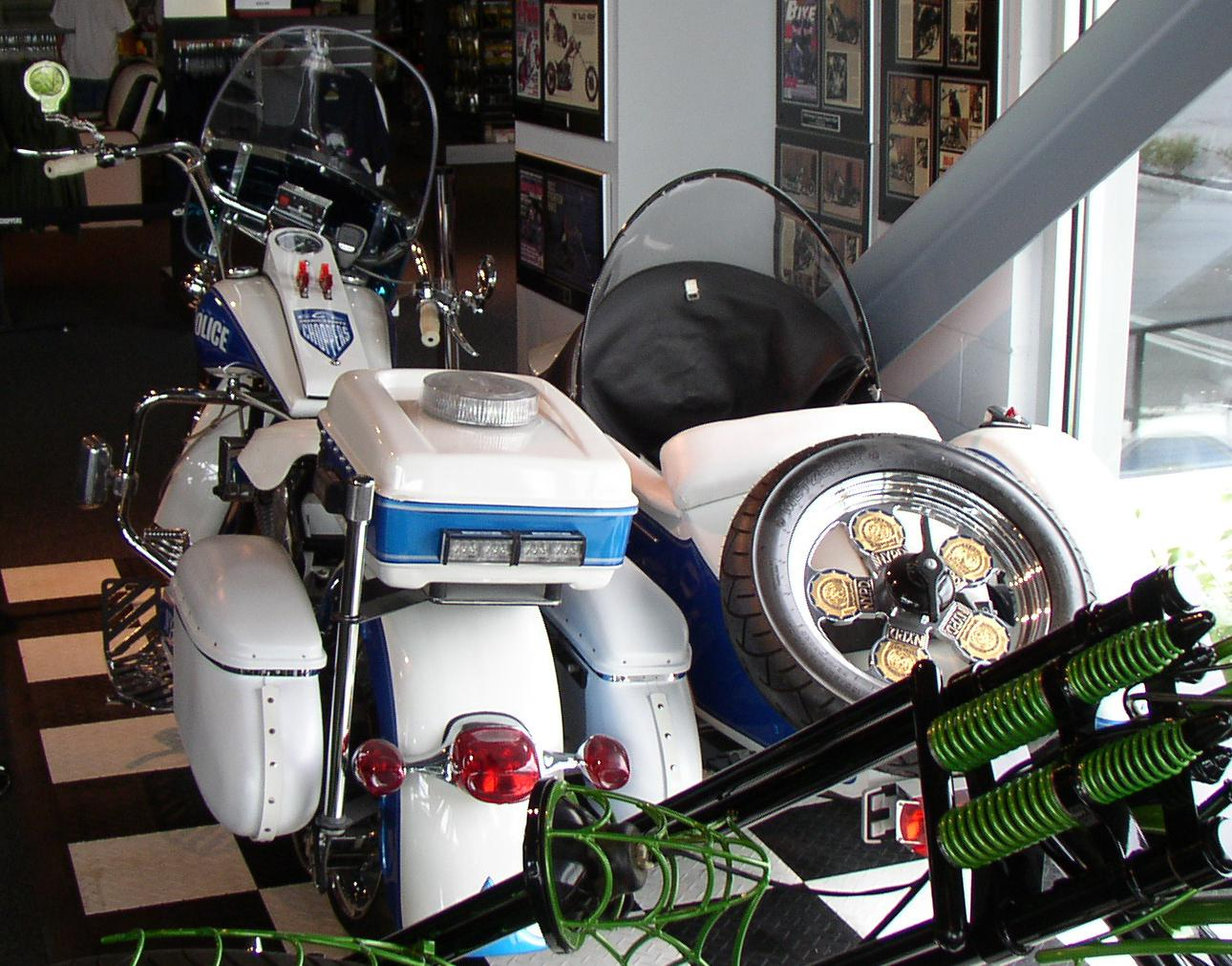
OCC "NYPD-Bike"

For the pilot episode, OCC produced a jet plane-themed bike, known as the "Jet Bike". Additionally, they have produced on-air a "Rat Bike", "Police Bike", "Lucy Bike", "Military Bike"s, "Talladega Bike", "Spider-Man Bike", "Clown Bike", "Flash Bike", "True Blue Bike", "Eragon Bike", "Rick's Dream Bike", and the "PureFit Nutrition Bar Bike" for founder and CEO, Robb Dorf.

== List of customer bikes ==
=== PureFit Nutrition Bars ===
Built for PureFit Nutrition Bars, the "PureFit Bike" has been said to be a very difficult build for OCC. Arguably, its build was the catalyst that built team-work at OCC and ultimately led the show to its success.

=== Snap-on ===
Season 1, Episodes 14&15 Original Airdates 12/08/03 12/15/03
Built for Snap-on tools, the "Tool Bike" incorporated several unfinished and untempered tools supplied to OCC by Snap-on. The frame was created using solid hex shaped metal bars (inspired by allen wrenches) instead of the more typical round tubing. The metal bars were hollowed out and bent by "Racing Innovations" resulting in a heavier than normal frame. Following the "allen wrench" theme, Paul Jr. bent sheets of 16 gauge cold rolled steel to create hex shaped exhaust covers. A fake oil tank was made in the shape of a miniature toolbox (the real oil tank was hidden on the bottom of the frame). The entire bike was sprayed with Snap-on's official red paint. As a hidden detail, an authentic ratchet was modified and used as kickstand.

=== New York Jets ===
Season 1, Episodes 16 Original Airdate 02/02/04
Built at the request of the New York Jets, and commissioned to for unveiling on opening day at Giants Stadium. The "Football Bike" is unique in how uneventful its build was. It is not particularly complex, with no extreme fabrication, paint work, or cutting close to deadlines. The bike was damaged and later purchased by Paul Jr. who now has it restored at Paul Jr. Designs.

=== Jay Leno ===
Season 2, Episodes 7&8 Original Airdate 02/23/04 03/01/04
After an appearance on The Tonight Show with Jay Leno, Paul Sr. and Paul Jr were invited on a private tour of "Jay Leno's Garage". There he showed them his 1930 Brough Superior SS100 which he described as "A Harley-Davidson that went to college". He commissioned the Teutul's to build a modern interpretation of the bike, but specified that he wasn't a big fan of choppers and wanted something in between. The bike included fabrication to the fuel tank, a luggage rack and a licence plate that read "OC3277", referring to Orange County [Choppers] and the date of Leno's first appearance on The Tonight Show on March 2, 1977, when the show was hosted by Johnny Carson. Leno was presented the bike on an episode of The Tonight Show.

=== Statue of Liberty Bike ===
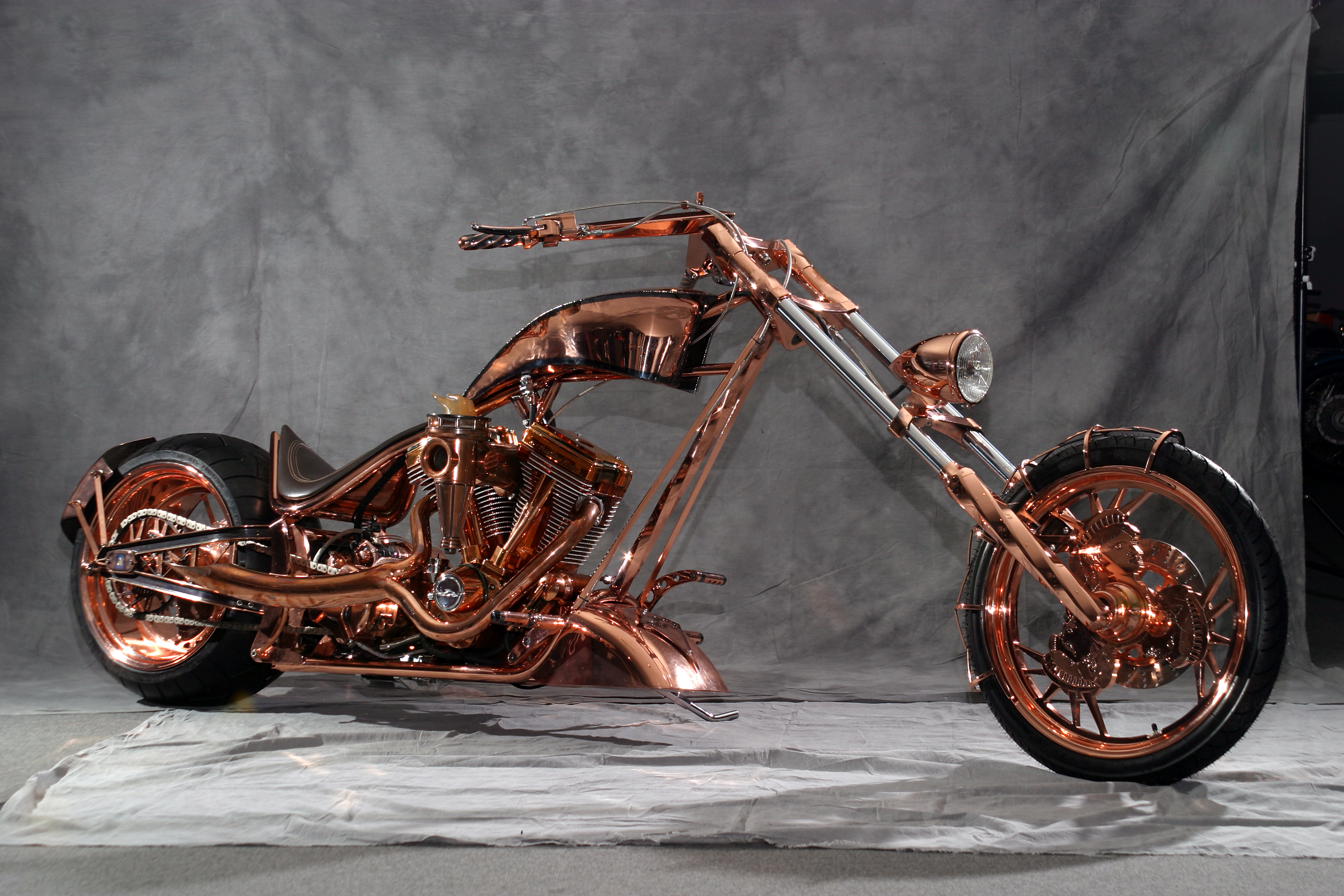
The Statue of Liberty Bike

Season 1, Episodes 24&25 Original Airdate 04/12/04 04/19/04
The "Liberty Bike" was commissioned by CEO Richard W. Stocks, of Soleia Company (formerly Goldeaf Corporation) a company that performed restoration work on the Statue of Liberty and maintains artifacts from it. Richard asked OCC to build a bike dedicated to the statue and freedom. The kicker was they were given a few choice artifacts from the statue itself to incorporate into the bike (a cable that lit the torch became the shifter, for example), and the entire bike was plated in copper from the actual statue.

=== Dixie Chopper ===
Season 1, Episodes 26&27 Original Airdate 05/03/04 05/10/04

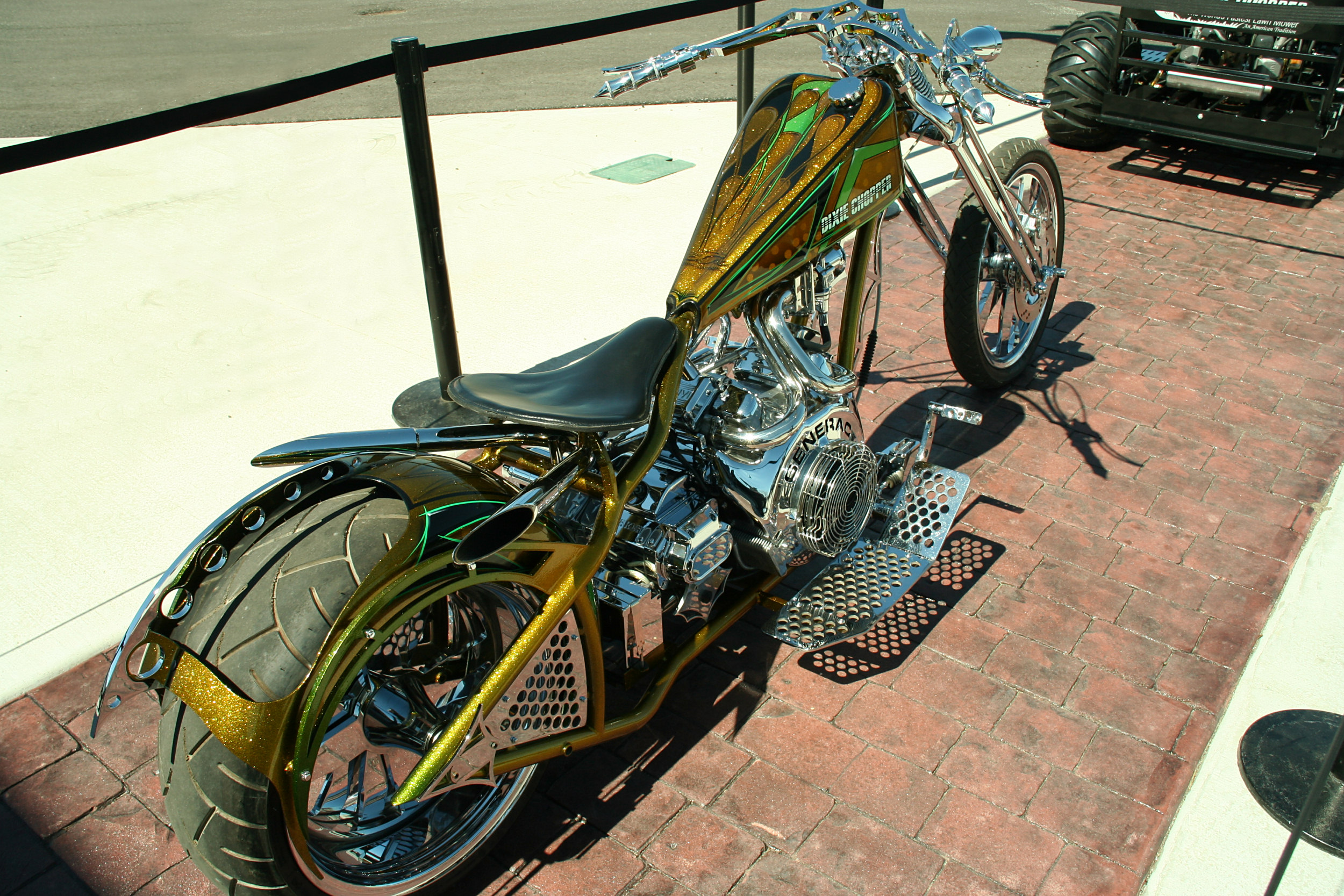
Dixie Chopper, rightview

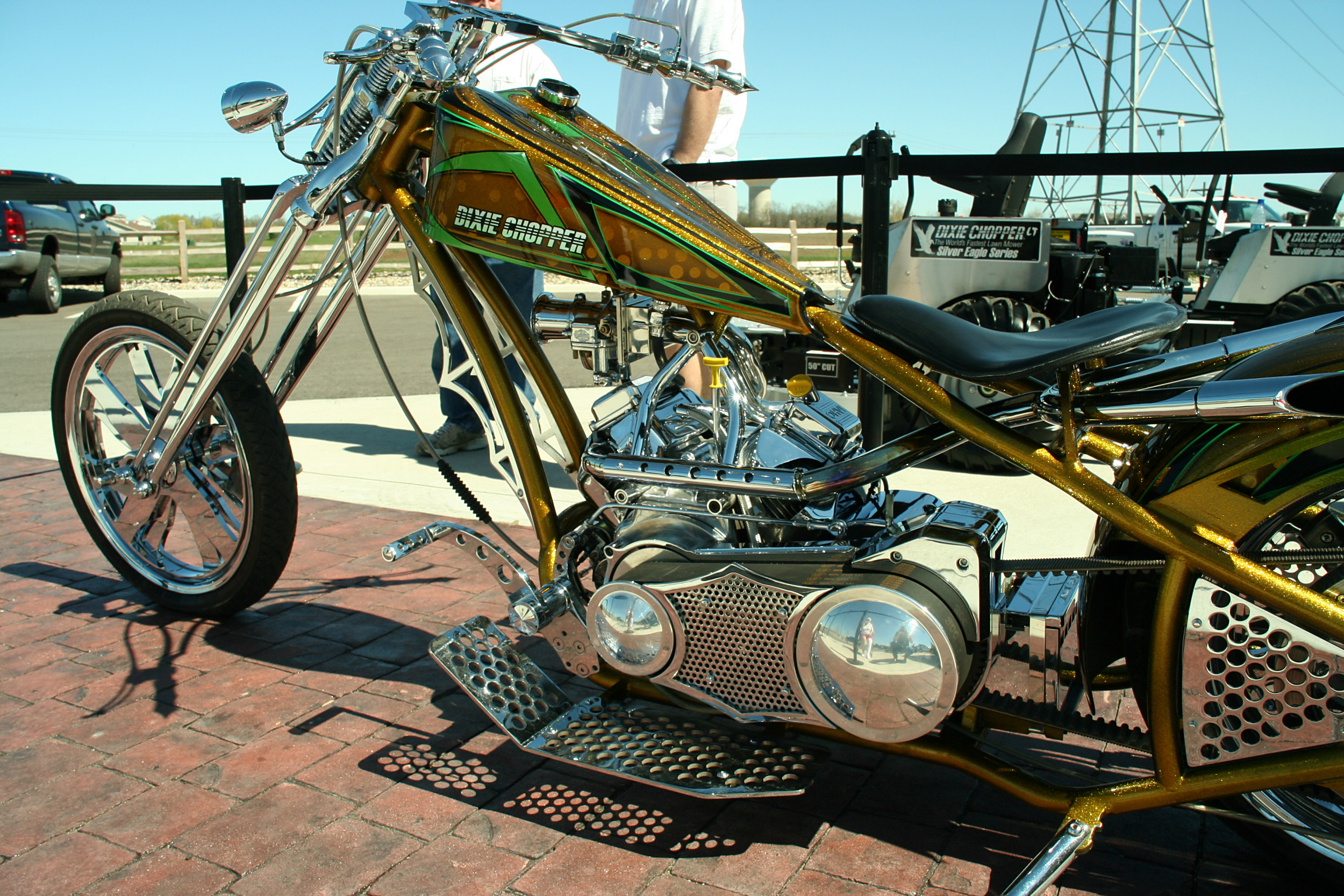
Dixie Chopper, left view

The lawn mower company Dixie Chopper (which bills itself as manufacturing the world's "fastest" lawn mower) hired OCC to build the "Dixie Chopper Bike" as a promo for their own line of lawnmowers, thinking the humor of the word "chopper" (which is both a well-known slang term for motorcycle, as well as related to its lawn mowers – which, of course, chop up grass) would be humorous enough to move product and promote company recognition. The bike uses one of Dixie Chopper's 1000cc 32 horsepower (24 kW) Generac lawn mower engines which, after modification, provides enough power to be suitable for a motorcycle engine.

=== NAPA ===
Built for NAPA auto parts, the frame is a basic 7up rigid custom, which was heavily modified. One crucial modification which put the whole project in jeopardy involved the backbone, which was too small for the motor picked for this bike. This meant that to make the bike work, the team would have to come up with an inventive solution. Vinnie's first idea called for the notching of the frame to make room for the motor. This change was necessary as the bike could not be ridden without the frame being altered. This was rejected as the notching would compromise the frame's integrity. That idea was replaced with something that would solve the frame issues and allow them to have a gas tank with the legal amount of fuel in it. They removed the existing backbone and replaced it with a piece of 1/4 inch steel tube.

=== Carroll Shelby ===
Built for racing designer Carroll Shelby, it has a sleek and cobra-like gas tank that took Rick 70 hours to complete and Shelby cobra emblem sets. When the bike came back from the paint shop, they discovered a major problem with the motor just hours before it had to be shipped to Las Vegas. They forged ahead, and the bike was completed just in time for the SEMA bike show.

=== Lincoln Mark LT ===
Commissioned to promote the Mark LT. Paul Jr. was the major fabricator on the project.

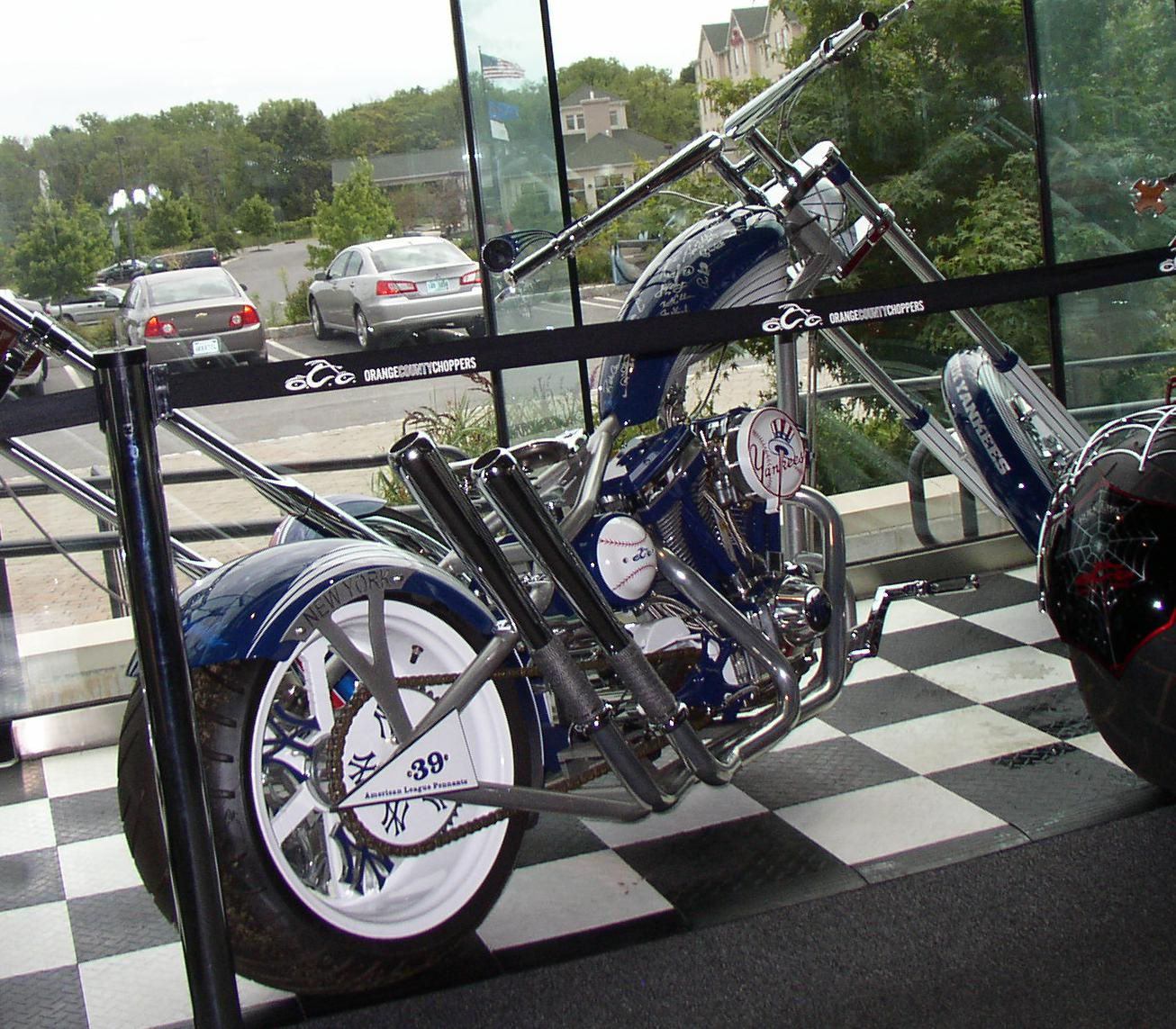
"New York Yankees Bike" in the OCC shop

=== Silver State Helicopters ===
Commissioned to promote Silver State Helicopters' flight-training business. In February 2008, Silver State Helicopters shuttered its doors abruptly, months after American Chopper aired both Silver State Chopper episodes (Parts 1 and 2), then declared Chapter 7 bankruptcy. Several enrolled students, both active and pending, filed class-action lawsuits; the Federal Trade Commission opened investigation into the business in May, 2008 for suspected Ponzi-scheme activity.

=== Other on-air projects ===
Additionally, OCC has produced bikes on-air for Davis Love III, TrimSPA, Sam's Club, the New York Yankees, NASA, FBI, David Mann, Wendy's, Sunoco, Bill Murray, Eragon, Go Daddy, Flojet, Hewlett-Packard, GoFast, Peavey, Russell Crowe, the Kansas City Royals, Case Cutlery, Caterpillar Inc., and the Iowa Farm Bureau.

=== Off-air projects ===
OCC also works on theme projects which are not featured on the television show.

The popularity of American Chopper led the United States Air Force to commission a $150,000 "Air Force Bike", first put on public display in March 2005. The motorcycle is ten feet long and is modeled after the F-22 Raptor, complete with Air Force symbol rims, riveted gas tank, Raptor exhausts and rear-view mirrors in the shape of jets. Air Force recruiters commissioned it as a public outreach tool.

Other theme customers include Solidworks, the United States Army, Pez Candy, the Big Gulp Bike for 7-Eleven stores, Cherokee Nation, Learjet, Airgas, Criss Angel Mindfreak, Speedco, Riptide, a flower Bike, Reeve Store Equipment Co., SLR, Werner Trucking, a hemi bike for Chrysler, Miami Heat, SealMaster, Eaton, Bass Pro Shops, University of Mississippi Ole Miss Rebels, South Sydney Rabbitohs and PDQ Manufacturing.

== See also ==
- Orange County Choppers
