= CBJ800 =

Aircraft

CBJ800 “Pegasus”, which stands for Chinese Business Jet 800, is a business jet developed by Chengdu Aircraft Industry Group, with collaboration of Shenyang Aircraft Corporation, Hongdu Aviation Industry Group, AVIC International and Chengdu Industry Investment Corporation. The model was first shown in Zhuhai Airshow 2012 and it was called Chinese Next Generation Business Jet at that time. In Chengdu International Business and General Aviation Exhibition of 2015, the newly showed model was painted with the formal name of CBJ800. According to the report from the meeting, the project will formally be started in 2016, and jet will be pushed to the market in 7–8 years.

== Specifications ==
Data from

General characteristics

- Crew: 2 flight crew + 1 flight attendant
- Capacity: 9-12
- Length: 24.3 m (79 ft 9 in)
- Wingspan: 24.58 m (80 ft 8 in)
- Height: 7.2 m (23 ft 7 in)
- Max takeoff weight: 25,000 kg (55,116 lb)

Performance

- Maximum speed: 912 km/h (567 mph, 492 kn)
- Cruise speed: 880 km/h (550 mph, 480 kn)
- Range: 8,000 km (5,000 mi, 4,300 nmi)
- Service ceiling: 13,106–14,326 m (42,999–47,001 ft)

== See also ==
Aircraft of comparable role, configuration, and era

- Embraer Legacy 650
