= Aviation Industry Corporation of China =

Chinese aerospace and defense manufacturer

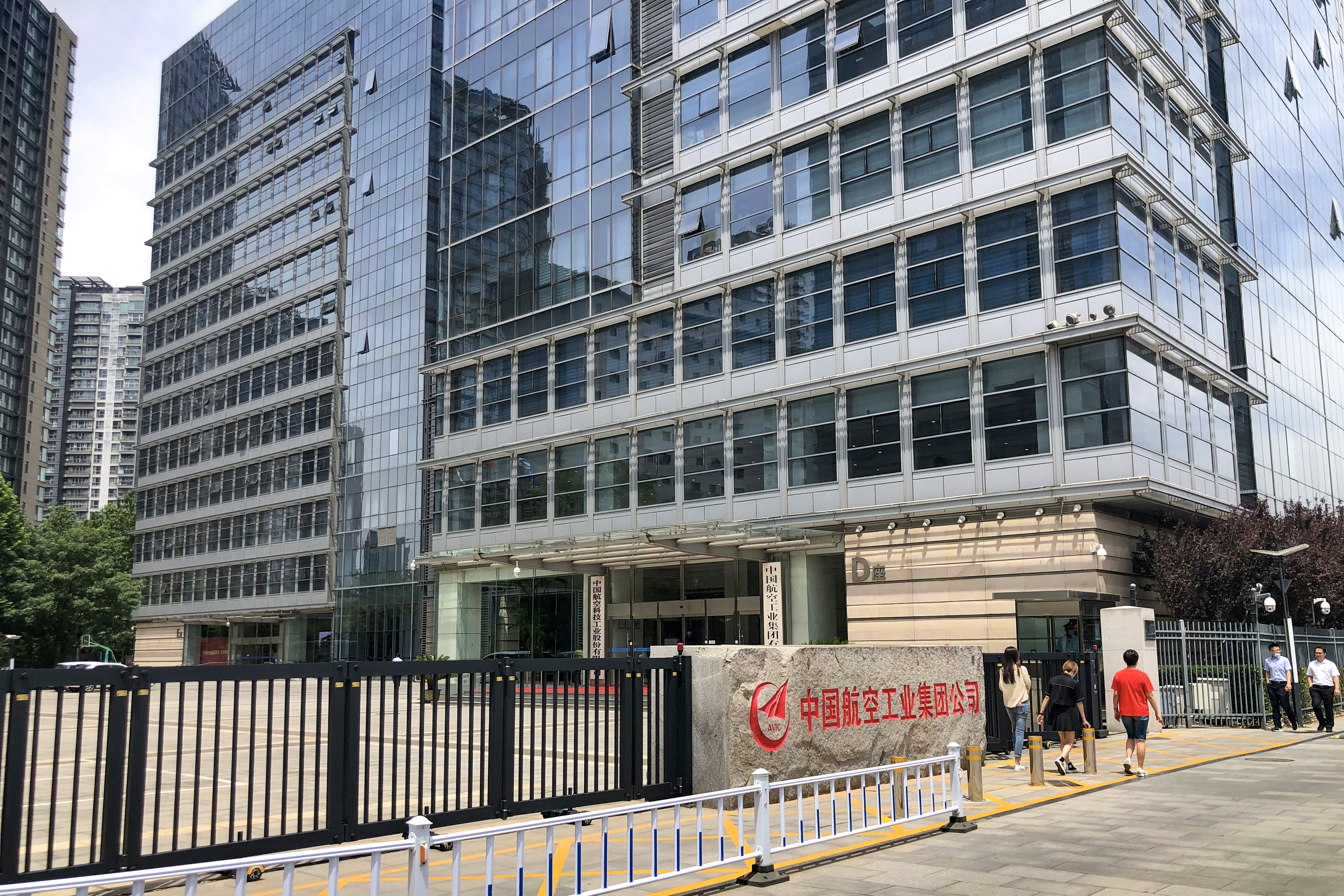
- AVIC headquarters
- Native name: 中国航空工业集团公司
- Type: Public; state-owned enterprise
- Industry: Aerospace; defense; electronics
- Predecessor: China Aviation Industry Corporation I China Aviation Industry Corporation II
- Founded: April 1, 1951; 75 years ago
- Headquarters: Chaoyang District, Beijing, China
- Area served: Worldwide
- Key people: Tan Ruisong (Chairman and CEO)
- Products: Civil and military aircraft Unmanned aerial vehicles Trucks; Automobile parts Electronics; Robots; Ships
- Revenue: ▲US$66.96 billion (2021)
- Operating income: ▲CN¥370.6 billion (2016)
- Net income: ▲US$915.7 million (2021)
- Total assets: ▲US$161.2 billion (2021)
- Number of employees: 407,344 (2021)
- Divisions: AVIC Aircraft; China Aviation Industry General Aircraft; Avicopter; China National Aero-Technology Import & Export Corporation
- Subsidiaries: AviChina Industry & Technology; AVIC Jonhon Optronic Technology; Harbin Aircraft Industry Group; Shenyang Aircraft Corporation; Xi'an Aircraft Industrial Corporation; Shaanxi Aircraft Corporation; Hongdu Aviation Industry Group; Changhe Aircraft Industries Corporation; Chengdu Aircraft Industry Group; Guizhou Aircraft Industry Corporation
- Website: en.avic.com

Aviation Industry Corporation of China
- Simplified Chinese: 中国航空工业集团公司
- Traditional Chinese: 中國航空工業集團公司
Transcriptions
Standard Mandarin
- Hanyu Pinyin: Zhōngguó Hángkōng Gōngyè Jítuán Gōngsī

Abbreviation
- Simplified Chinese: 航空工业
- Traditional Chinese: 航空工業
Transcriptions
Standard Mandarin
- Hanyu Pinyin: Hángkōng Gōngyè

Second alternative Chinese name
- Simplified Chinese: 中航工业
- Traditional Chinese: 中航工業
Transcriptions
Standard Mandarin
- Hanyu Pinyin: Zhōngháng Gōngyè

The Aviation Industry Corporation of China (AVIC) is a Chinese state-owned, publicly-traded aerospace and defense conglomerate headquartered in Beijing. AVIC is overseen by the State-owned Assets Supervision and Administration Commission of the State Council. It is ranked 140th in the Fortune Global 500 list as of 2021, and has over 100 subsidiaries, 27 listed companies and 500,000 employees across the globe. AVIC is also the sixth largest defense contractor globally as of 2022 and second largest Chinese defense contractor with total revenue of $79 billion (from both defense and non-defense services).

== History ==
Since being established on 1 April 1951 as the Aviation Industry Administration Commission, the aviation industry of the People's Republic of China has been through 12 systemic reforms.

In 1994, Avic was among the large industrial state-owned enterprises of China which were selected for a pilot program of restructuring as state holding companies, thereby enabling partial public listings of its subsidiaries' assets.

AVIC purchased American aircraft engine manufacturer Continental Motors, Inc. in 2010, aircraft manufacturer Cirrus in 2011, and specialized parts supplier Align Aerospace in 2015. In 2015, AVIC and BHR Partners acquired U.S. automotive supplier Henniges, through a joint venture structure.

In 2016, Aero Engine Corporation of China was formed, capitalized with US$7.5 billion by Aviation Industry Corporation of China (AVIC) and Commercial Aircraft Corporation of China, Ltd. (COMAC) in order to consolidate aero-engine and related technologies.

Period	Organization name
Apr 1951 – Aug 1952	Aviation Industry Bureau, Ministry of Heavy Industry
Aug 1952 – Feb 1958	4th Bureau, No.2 Mechanical Industry Department
Feb 1958 – Sept 1960	4th Bureau, No.1 Mechanical Industry Department
Sept 1960 – Sept 1963	4th Bureau, No.3 Mechanical Industry Department
Sept 1963 – Apr 1982	No.3 Mechanical Industry Department
Apr 1982 – Apr 1988	Ministry of Aviation Industry
Apr 1988 – Jun 1993	Ministry of Aviation and Aerospace Industry
Jun 1993 – Jun 1999	China Aviation Industry Corporation (中国航空工业总公司)
Jul 1999 – May 2008	China Aviation Industry Corporation I (AVIC I), China Aviation Industry Corporation II (AVIC II)
May 2008 – Nov 2008	China Aviation Industry Corporation I, China Aviation Industry Corporation II, Commercial Aircraft Corporation of China (COMAC)
Nov 2008 – Present	Aviation Industry Corporation of China, Commercial Aircraft Corporation of China (Note: AVIC is one of the shareholders in Comac (26.32% in 2009). However, AVIC and COMAC operate independently, and both companies are supervised by the State-owned Assets Supervision and Administration Commission of the State Council.)

=== Split and re-merger ===
China Aviation Industry Corporation was split into two separate entities, China Aviation Industry Corporation I and China Aviation Industry Corporation II in 1999. Both retained civilian and military aircraft production capabilities, along with a number of unrelated business ventures. The split was intended to foster competitiveness in the Chinese aerospace industry.

In 2008, AVIC I and AVIC II officially merged back together. The previous separation resulted in split resources and led to redundant projects. The goal of the merger was to eliminate this redundancy and spin off pursuits unrelated to aerospace, such as motorcycle and automobile parts manufacturing.

=== Espionage allegations ===
In April 2009, The Wall Street Journal reported that computer spies, allegedly Chinese, "had penetrated the database of the Joint Strike Fighter program and acquired terabytes of secret information about the fighter, possibly compromising its future effectiveness." AVIC allegedly "incorporated the stolen know-how into China's Chengdu J-20 and Shenyang FC-31 fighters."

=== U.S. sanctions ===
In November 2020, Donald Trump issued an executive order prohibiting any American company or individual from owning shares in companies that the United States Department of Defense has listed as having links to the People's Liberation Army, which included AVIC.

=== Russian invasion of Ukraine ===
In February 2023, the Center for Advanced Defense Studies reported that customs data showed that AVIC shipped parts for Sukhoi Su-35 fighter jets to a subsidiary of sanctioned Russian defense company Rostec following the 2022 Russian invasion of Ukraine.

=== Myanmar civil war ===
AVIC has provided weapons and aircraft to the Myanmar junta.

== Products ==
=== Airliner ===
List of airliners of AVIC
Aircraft	Type	Description	Developer	Seats	Number Built	Maiden Flight	Introduction	Production Ceased	Retired
Xian MA60	Turboprop Airliner	Turboprop Regional airliner	Xi'an Aircraft Industrial Corporation	62	110+(330 on order)	25 February 2000			
Xian MA600	Turboprop Airliner	Turboprop Regional airliner	Xi'an Aircraft Industrial Corporation	60	18+(310 on order)	10 October 2008			
Xian MA700	Turboprop Airliner	Turboprop Regional airliner	Xi'an Aircraft Industrial Corporation	68-86	-	planned November 2019			
CBJ800	Jet airliner	Business jet	Chengdu Aircraft Industry Group	9-12	-	planned 2016			

=== Civilian airship ===
- AVIC AS700 Airship

=== Fighter aircraft ===
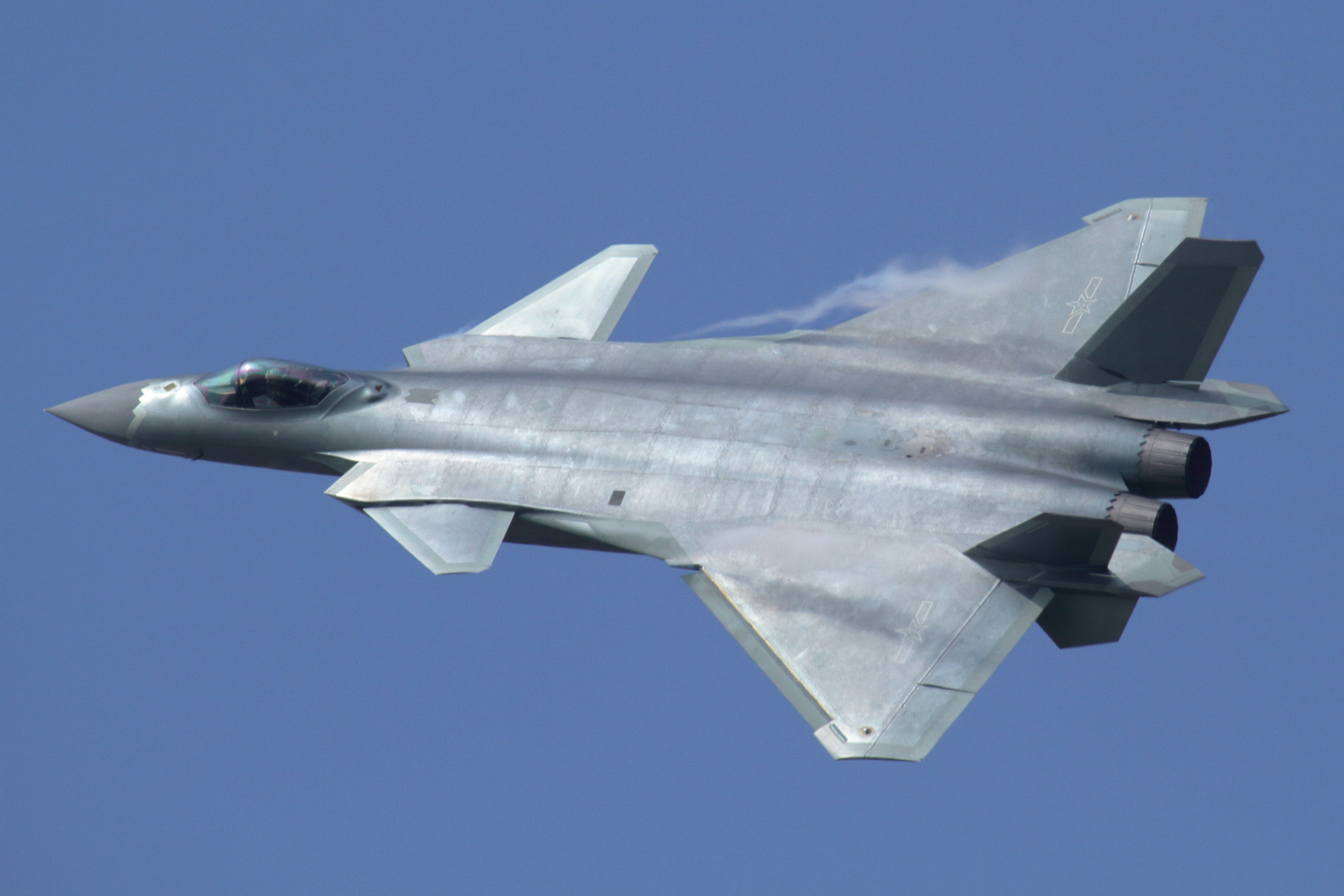
Chengdu J-20

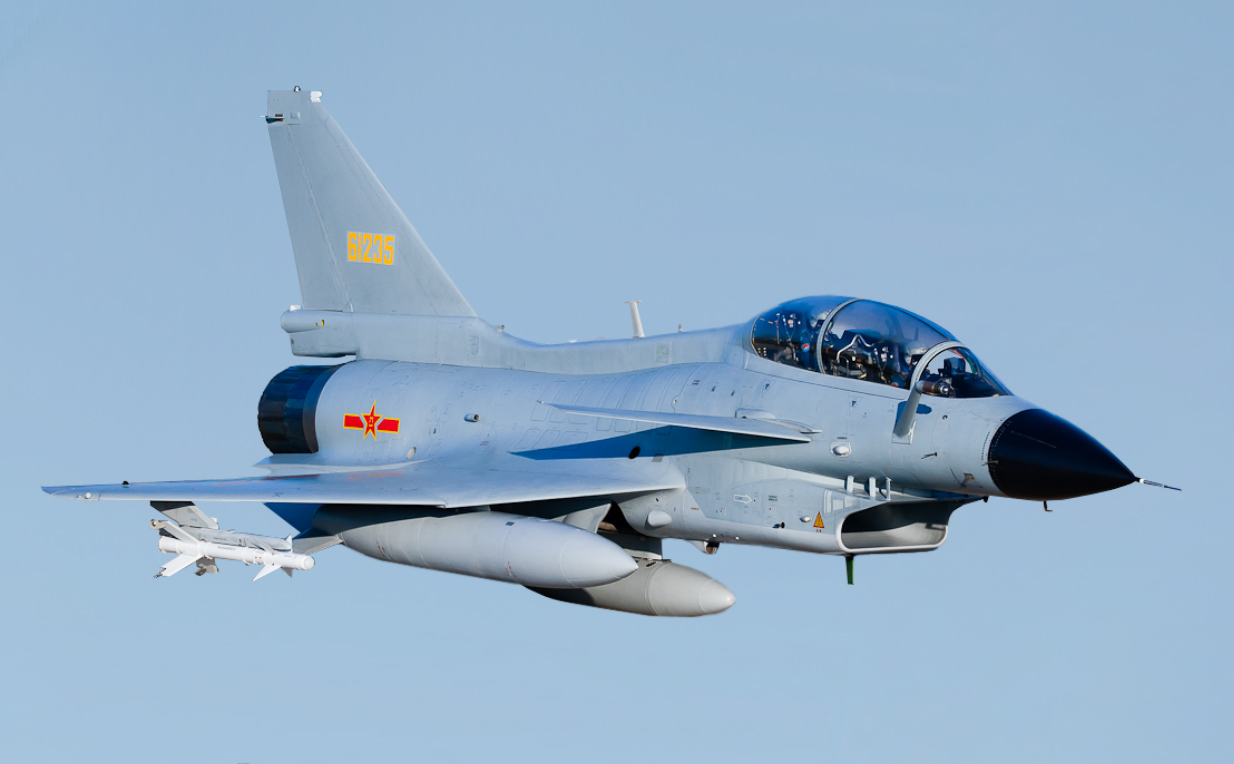
Chengdu J-10

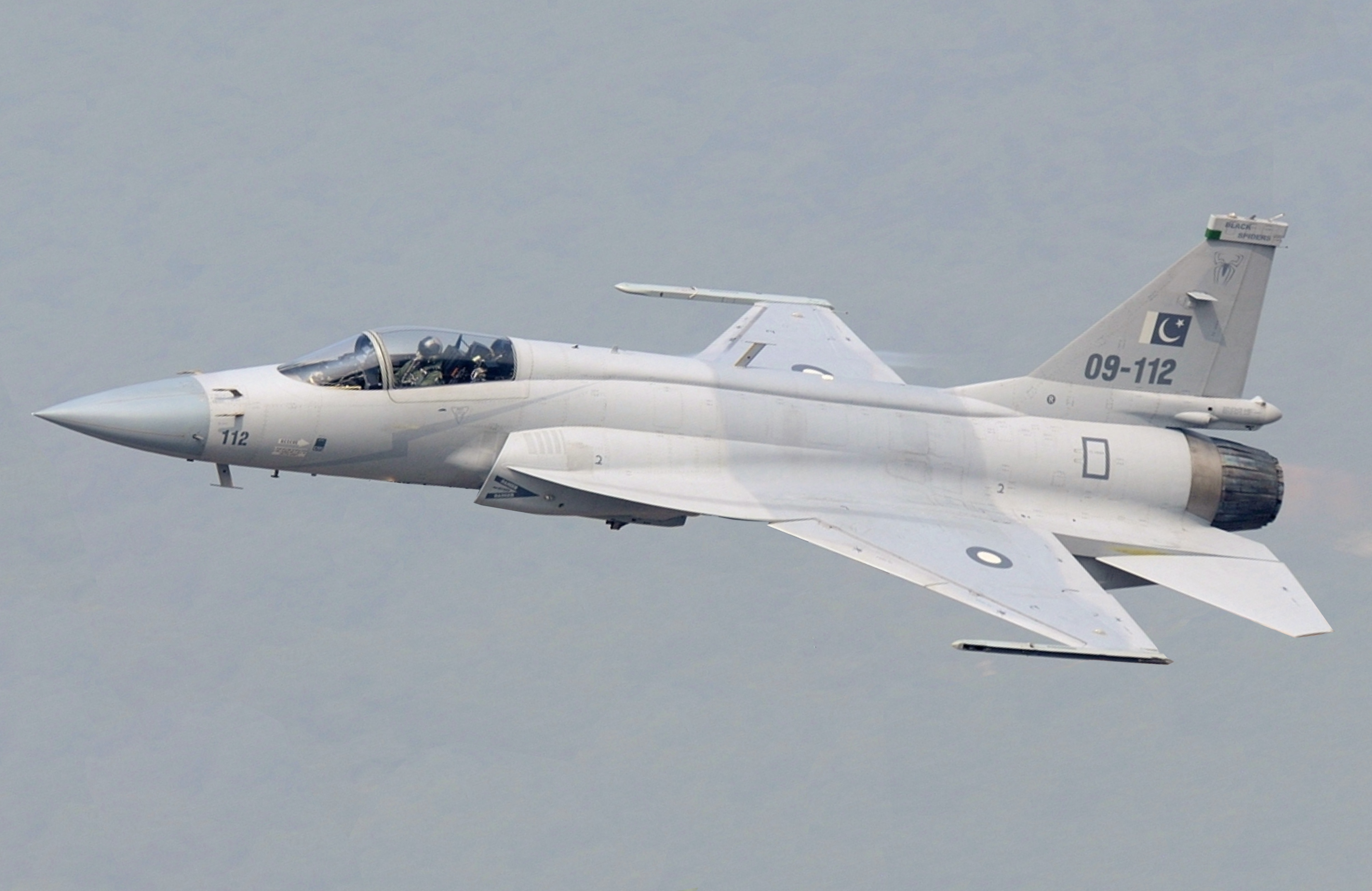
Chengdu/PAC JF-17

(*) indicates under development

- J-10
  - Chengdu J-10S (Trainer)
  - Chengdu J-10D* (EW)
- J-11
  - Shenyang J-11B/BG/BH
- J-15
- J-16
  - Shenyang J-16D (EW)
- JF-17
- J-20
  - Chengdu J-20A
  - Chengdu J-20S (Tandem seat)*
- J-35

=== Fighter bomber aircraft ===
- JH-7

=== Trainer aircraft ===
- JL-8
- JL-9
- L-15

=== Transport aircraft ===
- Y-7
- Y-8
- Y-9
- Y-11
- Y-12
- Y-14
- Y-20
  - Xi'an YY-20 (Aerial Refueling)
- MA60
- MA600
- MA700

=== Bomber aircraft ===
- H-6
- H-20*
- J-XX*

=== AEW&C aircraft ===
- KJ-200
- KJ-500
- KJ-600*
- KJ-2000

=== Helicopter ===
- AC313
- AC332
- Z-8
- Z-9
- Z-9W/G
- Z-10
- Z-11
- Z-18
- Z-19
- Z-20
- AVIC Advanced Heavy Lifter*
- Z-15 / AC352 / EC175
- HC-120/EC120

=== Unmanned aerial vehicle ===
- Pterodactyl I
- Soar Dragon
- AVIC Cloud Shadow

=== Electronic-warfare aircraft ===
- J-16D
- Y-8DZ
- Y-9G (GX-11)

=== Maritime-patrol aircraft ===
- Harbin SH-5
- Harbin PS-5
- AVIC AG600
- Y-8FQ

== See also ==
- List of aircraft produced by China
- Commercial Aircraft Corporation of China (COMAC)
- Aero Engine Corporation of China (AECC)
