= Anixter =

American Company

Anixter International Inc.
- Type: Subsidiary
- Industry: Distribution (business)
- Founded: 1957; 69 years ago
- Headquarters: Glenview, Illinois, U.S.
- Key people: William Galvin (president & CEO)
- Products: Communication products and electrical and electronic wire and cable
- Revenue: ▲US$6.147 billion (FY 2011)
- Operating income: ▲US$362.8 million (FY 2011)
- Net income: ▼US$188.2 million(FY 2011)
- Total assets: ▲US$ 3.034 billion (FY 2011)
- Total equity: ▼US$1.001 billion (FY 2011)
- Number of employees: 6,008 (2022)
- Parent: WESCO International
- Website: anixter.com

Anixter International Inc. is a company based in Glenview, Illinois, United States and founded in 1957. The company supplies goods and services for communications, security, networking, audio-visual, and industrial control applications.

The company operates with three major divisions: Network & Security Solutions, Electrical and Electronic Solutions, and Utility Power Solutions. Aerospace Hardware, once considered the fourth division, was sold by Anixter in 2011 to Greenbriar Equity, which formed Align Aerospace.

In 2002 Anixter was named as a Forbes "Platinum 400" company.

On January 13, 2020, Anixter agreed to be acquired by WESCO International for $4.5 billion in cash and WESCO stock. Anixter's shares ceased trading as of June 22, 2020.

== History ==
Anixter was started in 1956 by brothers Alan and Bill Anixter. Known originally as Anixter Brothers, the two opened Anixter as a wholesale distribution company that resold cable. The two brothers received a $20,000 loan from their mother to get the business started, and within 10 years grew revenue to $10 million. In 1969, Anixter moved its headquarters to Skokie. In an interview with the Chicago Tribune, Alan Anixter said he carried a list of acquisitions in his pocket, and by the end of the 1960s, Anixter acquired 19 companies. Anixter went public on the American Stock Exchange in 1967 and expanded to the U.K. in 1972. In 1975, Anixter gained a listing on the New York Stock Exchange, and by the end of the 1970s it had $268 million in sales and 38 warehouses in the U.S., nine in Canada, three in the U.K. and one in the Netherlands.

With the breakup of AT&T in early 1984, Anixter went about hiring executives from phone companies and suppliers and invested heavily in its telecommunications business. Until this time, regional telephone companies had to buy their equipment directly from AT&T's Western Electric Company; however, this ruling allowed a business like Anixter's to sell direct to regional telephone companies. By the mid 1980s, telecommunications sales made up 60 to 70 percent of Anixter's business. In 1986, the holding company Itel bought Anixter, which had moved into the data communications business. Itel was led by Samuel Zell, who had become chairman in 1985.

In the late 1980s, Anixter created a program called Levels to compare one brand of cable to the other. By the 1990s, the Levels program became industry standard, and in 2003, Anixter sold the Levels program to Underwriters Laboratories.

In 1989, Anixter crossed the $1 billion mark in sales. By the 1990s, Itel made Anixter its core operation, and in 1995, Itel changed its name to Anixter. In the 1990s, Anixter continued to expand into different markets. It entered the Mexico market in 1991, Australia in 1992, and Eastern Europe and Asia Pacific in 1993. Anixter entered the South American market in 1995. In the later 1990s and 2000s, Anixter purchased Pacer Electronics, Pentacon, Walters Hexagon, DDI, Infast Group, MFU, Eurofast, Total Supply Solutions, Quality Screw & Nut and Quality Screw de Mexico, World Class Wire & Cable, Sofrasar, CamilleGergen, CLARK Security Products and Jorvex.
