= Acuity Brands =

Industrial company

Acuity Inc.

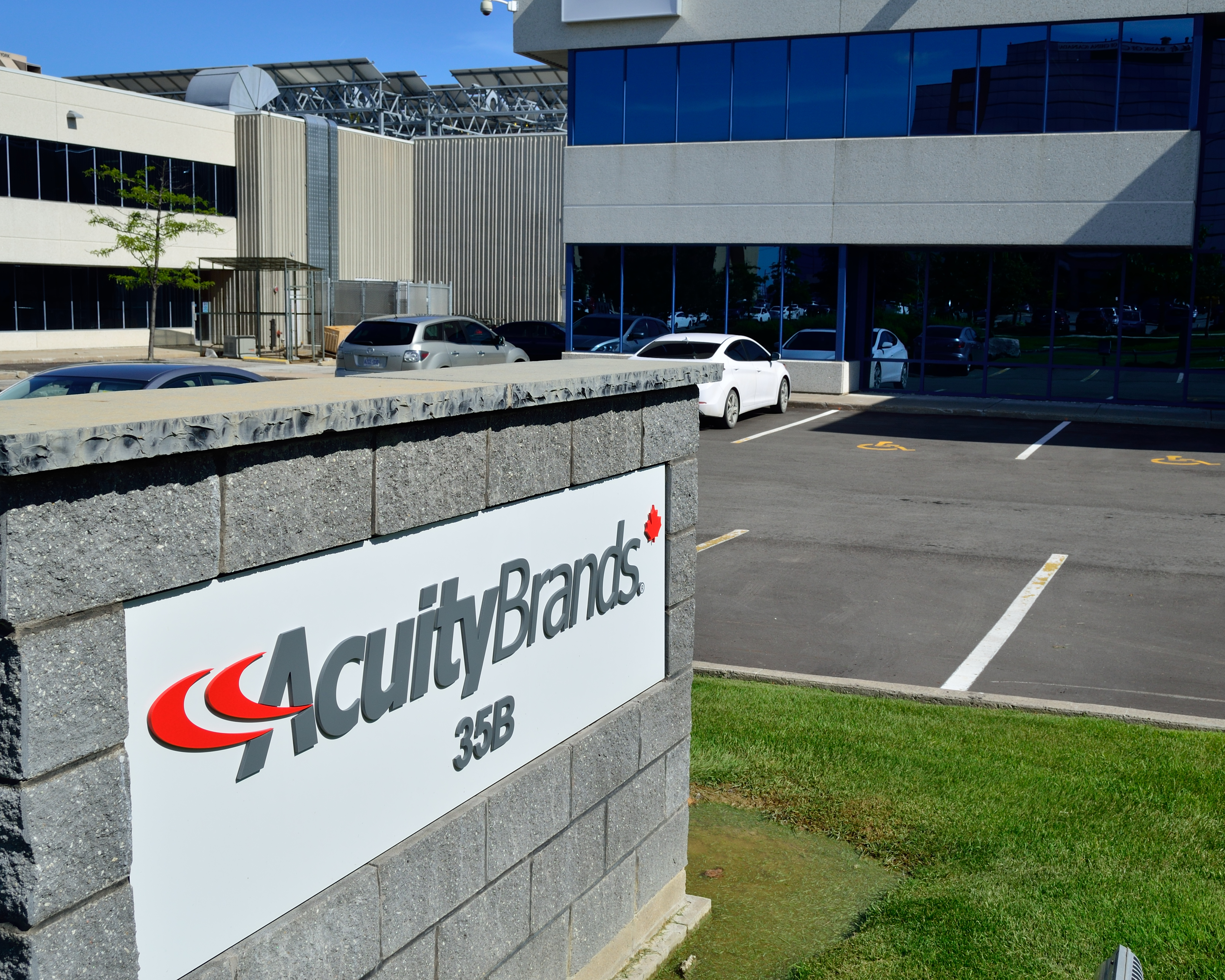
- Type: Public
- Traded as: NYSE: AYI; S&P 400 component
- Industry: Commercial and industrial lighting, and building management
- Founded: 1892; 134 years ago
- Headquarters: Atlanta, Georgia, U.S.
- Area served: Worldwide
- Key people: Neil Ashe (CEO)
- Products: Consumer Goods; List of brands
- Revenue: ▲US$3.952 billion (2023)
- Operating income: ▲US$492.6 million (2017)
- Net income: ▲US$321.7 million (2017)
- Total assets: ▲US$2.989 billion (2017)
- Total equity: ▲US$1.717 billion (2017)
- Number of employees: ▲11,500 (2020)
- Website: acuityinc.com

Acuity Inc. is an industrial technology company headquartered in Atlanta, Georgia, with operations throughout North America and in Europe and Asia. As of 2024 the company has approximately 12,000 employees and recorded net sales of $3.84 billion for the fiscal year. In terms of market share, Acuity Brands is the largest lighting manufacturer in North America.

== History ==
The roots of Acuity Brands date back to 1919 when Isadore M. Weinstein founded the Atlanta Linen Supply company. Weinstein had previously been employed in the towel supply business in Cleveland, and after serving in World War I, he started his own business renting towels, uniforms, and linens. He opened several locations throughout the south, changing the name to the Southern Linen Service Corporation in 1920. The company went public in 1928 as National Linen Service Corporation and continued to grow, eventually expanding to markets in the southwest and west coast. By 1944, the company was listed on the New York Stock Exchange.

Following World War II, Weinstein's son, Milton, had taken over the company. In the 1950s, National Linen faced an antitrust suit due to its dominance in the otherwise fragmented linens industry. The suit was settled in 1956, and in an effort to assuage future antitrust concerns, the company began to diversify. National Linen's first acquisition outside of linens and uniforms was Zep Manufacturing Company, an Atlanta-based chemical and janitorial supply manufacturer, in 1962. Zep became synonymous with NSI's chemical division, acquiring Selig Chemical Industries in 1968 and several smaller acquisitions throughout the 1970s and 1980s. To better reflect its new variety of business units, National Linen became National Service Industries (NSI) in 1964. Zep co-founder Erwin Zaban, who had stayed on following the company's acquisition and was also Weinstein's neighbor, took over NSI's operation in 1966.

In 1969, NSI acquired Lithonia Lighting Inc., a light fixture manufacturer founded in Georgia in 1946, and established a lighting division. Along with the chemical division that grew out of the Zep acquisition, the lighting division that grew out of the Lithonia Lighting acquisition formed the foundation for what would eventually become Acuity Brands. NSI acquired several other lighting manufacturers over the next 30 years, the largest of which occurred in 1999, when Ohio-based Holophane Corporation, a large outdoor and industrial lighting manufacturer, was purchased. Zaban continued NSI's new expansion strategy of acquiring profitable companies without much consideration for synergy among the company's increasing number of business units throughout the 1970s and 1980s. Six business units remained at the core of NSI's operations: linens, chemicals, lighting, insulation, envelopes, and printing. However, the total number of business units ebbed and flowed throughout this period as Zaban acquired companies in a variety of other industries and divested as soon as they became unprofitable.

By the 1990s, NSI's lighting and chemical divisions made up more than half of the company's revenues and operating incomes combined, and both divisions were still rapidly growing. In 1992, NSI added Graham Group, Europe's second-largest specialty chemical manufacturer at the time, and Kleen Canada to its chemical division. NSI added outdoor lighting company Infranor Canada in 1995 and invested in a fluorescent lighting manufacturing facility in Monterrey, Mexico that would serve the entire North American market. The chemical division expanded further in 1997 with the acquisition of Enforcer Products and Pure Corporation.

In 2001, National Service Industries announced it would combine the lighting and chemical divisions and spin off that combined entity as a separate, publicly traded company. Initially incorporated as L&C Spinco in June 2001, it was renamed Acuity Brands in November of the same year.

James S. Balloun, who had taken over as CEO of NSI in the mid-1990s, moved with the spinoff to serve as the president, CEO, and chairman of the board. Balloun retired in September 2004 and was replaced by Vernon J. Nagel, who had joined the firm as executive vice president and chief financial officer in December 2001.

Effective July 2007, the company's chemical division, Acuity Specialty Products, spun off as Zep, Inc. and included the Zep, Enforcer, and Selig brands. The remaining Acuity Brands, Inc. became the holding company for Acuity Brands Lighting, which included the Lithonia Lighting, Holophane, Peerless, and Mark Architectural brands, among others.

Nagel's tenure as CEO saw the transition of the lighting industry to LED lighting as well as the rise of smart lighting and the internet of things. Acuity grew with these changes in technology, launching the Atrius IoT brand in 2017 after the acquisitions of Sensor Switch and organic creation of brands such as nLight and ROAM. In January 2020, after 16 years as president and CEO, Nagel stepped aside to become executive chairman, and Neil Ashe was named the new head of the company. In July 2024, Sach Sankpal was named president of Acuity Brands Lighting and Lighting Controls (ABL).

== Products ==
The firm's products include luminaires, lighting controls, building system controllers, prismatic skylights, drivers, power supplies and integrated systems for indoor and outdoor applications in commercial, industrial, institutional, infrastructure and residential spaces.

They include recessed, surface, suspended, downlight, decorative, track and emergency indoor luminaires as well as outdoor lighting for street and roadway, parking, flood, landscape, site, area and underwater applications. It also provides digital networked lighting, building management and IoT. modular wiring, LED drivers, photo controls, occupancy sensors, dimming panels, relay panels, integrated lighting control systems, and products and services related to networked technology, building automation and building analytics.

The firm markets its products and services under a variety of brand names including Aculux, Eureka, Holophane, Juno, nLight, Pathway, and Distech.

== Acquisitions ==
Acquisition date	Company	Country
February 2009	Lighting Control & Design	US
April 2009	Sensor Switch, Inc.	US
July 2010	Renaissance Lighting	US
October 2010	Winona Lighting	US
February 2011	Sunoptics Sold to AES Industries in 2022.	US
February 2011	Healthcare Lighting	US
August 2011	Horizon Control	US
October 2011	Pathway Connectivity, Inc.	Canada
January 2013	Adura Technologies	US
January 2013	eldoLAB Holding BV (eldoLED)	The Netherlands
March 2015	Distech Controls	Canada
April 2015	ByteLight, Inc.	US
December 2015	Juno Lighting Group	US
January 2016	GeoMetri	US
July 2016	DGLogik	US
February 2018	Lucid Design Group, Inc.	US
May 2018	IOTA Engineering	US
June 2019	WhiteOptics	US
September 2019	The Luminaires Group	Canada
November 2019	LocusLabs, Inc.	US
December 2021	OSRAM's digital systems	US
May 2023	KE2 Therm	US
November 2023	Acquired Arize horticultural lighting products from Current Lighting Solutions, LLC.	US
October 2024	QSC, LLC,	US
