= AVIC AS700 Airship =

Type of aircraft

AS700 class

General information
- Type: Passenger/commercial non-rigid airship
- National origin: China
- Manufacturer: AVIC
- Designer: AVIC
- Status: In service
- Primary user: AVIC
- Number built: 3 prototypes 18-20 ordered

History
- First flight: October 2022

The AVIC AS700-class of airships (otherwise known as the Xiangyun-class which translates to auspicious clouds) is a class of non-rigid airships built for commercial and tourism use. It is developed and built by AVIC as its first attempt in the civilian airship market.

== Design and development ==
The AS700 is a medium-sized blimp that is around 48 meters (158 ft) long, a height of 12 meters (39 ft) and a total volume of around 3,500 m^{3} (123,600 ft^{3}). Like almost all modern airships, helium is used as the lifting gas.

The AS700 has an ellipsoid hull, with a rigid tail configuration done in an "X" positioning rather than the traditional "+" positioning. The design is considered as a light and cost-effective capsule-shaped airship. The tail has flight control surfaces to allow in ease in steering. The gondola of the airship possess a non-retractable single-point landing gear under the rear which creates a center of gravity that gives the AS700 stability when being ferried on the ground.

As a non-rigid airship, the AS700's envelope is a single lift gas cell manufactured from a multi-layer fabric-film laminate composite material that provides the needed strength, low helium leak rate, tear and weather resistance. Within the outer envelope, the airship possess ballonets for pitch control. The ballonets are made from lightweight polymer cells which is equipped with helium safety valves to prevent over-pressurization and to allow for a safe landing in the event of maneuvering system failure.

The AS700 feature modern fly-by-wire flight control systems with advanced avionics, with the gondola being big enough to house a single pilot alongside 9 passengers and can be configured with a food service facility and a washroom. The large windows are designed to open in flight. Pilot controls are done with a side stick controller, which makes the blimp easy to operate. It can also be configured for unmanned operations.

An interesting aspect of the AS700 is its thrust-vectoring features. The blimp possess modern thrust vectoring propulsion systems that allows the AS700 to do both STOL and VTOL operations. The maximum takeoff weight is 4,150 kg with the maximum range being 700 km. Likewise, its maximum flight time is recorded to be 10 hours and is capable of achieving a maximum speed of a 100 km/h. Since it is a civilian blimp, AVIC recommends that the airship to not fly under treacherous weather conditions such as thunderstorms, snowstorms, heavy fog or lightning.

== Overview and history ==
The AS700 is designed largely for civilian usage, specifically, in the tourism sector. The project first began in August 2018. According to the project manager of the AS700, Du Wei, he stated that the airship's market is built in line with China's consumption transformation and upgrading needs. Specifically for low-altitude sightseeing and tourism as well as potentially expanding the ship's services to emergency rescue, urban public services and other fields.

Currently, three prototypes were built. The first was an unmanned platform that flew in October 2022 as a technological demonstrator. The second and third prototypes were manned vehicles tasked in completing various tests to ensure safety checks. The second prototype made its maiden flight in Hubei on the 29 December 2022. The flight lasted 39 minutes. On the 13 December 2023, the Civil Aviation Administration of China issued a type certificate for the AS700, making it the first manned airship in China to be domestically developed and certified. The third prototype successfully made its maiden voyage on April 2, 2024, in Hubei province again. The flight took one hour and 46 minutes.

AVIC estimates that there is a market demand for 100 airships of this type over the next 10 years, but currently, it has only received orders of around 18-20 copies which should delivered by the end of 2024. The airship became commercially operational in September 2024. An all-electric variant, the AS700D completed its first maiden flight in February 2025.

== Specifications ==
General characteristics

- Crew: ca. 1 pilot
- Capacity: ca. 9 passengers
- Length: 48 m (158 ft 0 in)
- Diameter: 12 m (39 ft 0 in)
- Volume: 3,500 m^{3} (123,600 cu ft)
- Useful lift: 4,150 kg (9,149 lb)
- Powerplant: 2 × Lycoming IO-390-C3B6 aviation piston engines (AS700) , 160 kW (215 hp) each
- Powerplant: 2 × Lithium battery engines (AS700D)

Performance

- Maximum speed: 100 km/h (62 mph, 54 kn)
