= Lucid Design Group, Inc. =

- Company type: Private
- Industry: Technology
- Founded: 2004
- Defunct: 2018
- Fate: Acquired
- Successor: Acuity Brands
- Headquarters: Oakland, California, United States
- Key people: CEO: Will Coleman
- Products: Data monitoring, display and analysis for the built environment
- Website: lucidconnects.com

Lucid Design Group (Lucid) was an American company based in Oakland, California that offered building analytics systems. The company's "Building Dashboard" and "BuildingOS" software provided real-time, web-based feedback on electric, gas, and water use within buildings.

== History ==
The company was founded by John Petersen, Vladi Shunturov, Michael Murray and Gavin Platt in 2004.

In February 2018, Lucid was acquired by Acuity Brands, Inc.
