= Dixie Chopper =

Agricultural machinery manufacturers of the United States

- Type: Subsidiary
- Industry: Manufacturing
- Founded: 1980; 46 years ago
- Founder: Art Evans
- Headquarters: Fillmore, Indiana, United States
- Products: Residential and commercial lawnmowers
- Parent: Alamo Group
- Website: www.dixiechopper.com

Dixie Chopper is a discontinued American brand of industrial zero-turning lawn mower formerly manufactured in Fillmore, Indiana, relocated to Gibson City, Illinois for a short period of time, but returned to Greencastle, Indiana. Many of the original assemblers from the Fillmore (Coatesville) facility returned to Dixie Chopper.

== History ==
Dixie Chopper was founded by Hoosier Art Evans in 1980. In February 2014 Dixie Chopper was purchased by Jacobsen/Textron. However, on December 5, 2018, Textron notified dealers that they had ceased production of the Dixie Chopper.

On August 29, 2019, Dan Samet, president of Rhino Ag, stated that, “... we’re in the process of ordering parts and retooling the facility to start making Dixie Chopper mowers. Our goal is to have Dixie Choppers available for our dealers in time for the 2020 mowing season".

On August 5, 2019, Alamo group announced that they had acquired the assets of Dixie Chopper from Jacobsen/Textron. On August 9, 2019, Alamo executive vice president, Dan Malone stated that they were working to transition equipment from Dixie Chopper's former manufacturing facility in Fillmore, Ind., to Alamo's Gibson City, Ill., location where Rhino Ag equipment is manufactured.

On December 5, 2019, Dixie Chopper posted a video to their YouTube channel announcing, "Dixie Chopper has a new home in Gibson City, IL at the RhinoAg manufacturing facility. 104 days after the company was acquired, the first Dixie Chopper mower has rolled off the assembly line." However, their Facebook post on the same day includes the caveat, "This is a pilot run where we address any quality and assembly concerns before full production begins".

On September 30, 2026, Alamo Group, the owner of Dixie Chopper, announced that the company would no longer produce Dixie Chopper mowers.

Dixie Chopper claims to build the world's fastest lawn mowers. The most famous example was the Jet Mower, custom built by Art Evans in 1991 using a 150 HP Solar T62 APU from a Chinook Helicopter. This mower was featured in a 1993 episode of Home Improvement. Dixie Chopper's promotional video includes a brief clip from the episode.

== Dixie Chopper Motorcycle ==
The company was featured on an episode of American Chopper where the Dixie Chopper Bike was built by Orange County Choppers and unveiled at Daytona Bike Week in 2004. The Bike featured a modified 1000cc Generac lawn mower engine rated at 32 horsepower (24 kW), which after some modifications produced a surprising amount of power despite not being a normal bike engine. The Jet Mower and Dixie Chopper Bike are mentioned in the Company History 1993 and 2005.
