= China Aviation Industry Corporation I =

Chinese consortium of aircraft manufacturers

China Aviation Industry Corporation I (AVIC I) was a Chinese consortium of aircraft manufacturers. The consortium was created on 1 July 1999 by splitting the state-owned consortium Aviation Industry Corporation of China (AVIC) into AVIC I and AVIC II. AVIC I was historically focused on large planes such as bombers (Xian H-6, Xian JH-7), medium commercial planes (ARJ21), or fighter planes (J-7, J-8, J-10, J-11 and JF-17), while AVIC II was focused on smaller planes and helicopters. On 28 October 2008, the companies officially consolidated back into one organization to more efficiently manage resources and avoid redundant projects.

== Subsidiaries ==
- Chengdu Aircraft Industry Group
- Guizhou Aircraft Industry Co.
- Shanghai Aviation Industrial Company
- Shenyang Aircraft Corporation
- Xi'an Aircraft Industrial Corporation

== Other Units ==
- ACAC consortium
- Comac

== See also ==
- China Aviation Industry Corporation
- China Aerospace Science and Technology Corporation
- People's Liberation Army Air Force
- China Aviation Industry Corporation II (AVIC II)
- Commission of Science, Technology and Industry for National Defense
- China Northern Industries
- China Shipbuilding Industry Corporation
- China State Shipbuilding Corporation
- List of Chinese aircraft
- List of Chinese aircraft engines
