= China Aviation Industry Corporation II =

Chinese consortium of aircraft manufacturers

China Aviation Industry Corporation II (AVIC II) was a Chinese consortium of aircraft manufacturers. The consortium was created on July 1, 1999, by splitting the state-owned consortium China Aviation Industry Corporation (AVIC) into AVIC I and AVIC II. AVIC I was mainly focused on large planes, while AVIC II was mainly focused on smaller planes, such as trainers (JL-8, utility aircraft (licensed version of Cessna 208 Caravan), L-15, and CJ-6), small passenger airliners (Harbin Y-12), medium range transport aircraft (Y-8), and helicopters (Z-8, Z-9, WZ-10 and Z-11). On October 28, 2008, the companies officially consolidated back into one organization to more efficiently manage resources and avoid redundant projects.

== Subsidiaries ==
- Changhe Aircraft Industries Corporation
- Harbin Aircraft Manufacturing Corporation
- Hongdu Aviation Industry Corporation
- Shaanxi Aircraft Company
- Shijiazhuang Aircraft Industry Co. Ltd

== See also ==
- Aviation Industry Corporation of China
- People's Liberation Army Air Force
- China Aviation Industry Corporation I (AVIC I)
- China Aerospace Science and Technology Corporation
- Commission of Science, Technology and Industry for National Defense
- China Northern Industries
- China Shipbuilding Industry Corporation
- China State Shipbuilding Corporation
- List of Chinese aircraft
- List of Chinese aircraft engines
