= Zep (company) =

American cleaning product manufacturer

Zep, Inc.
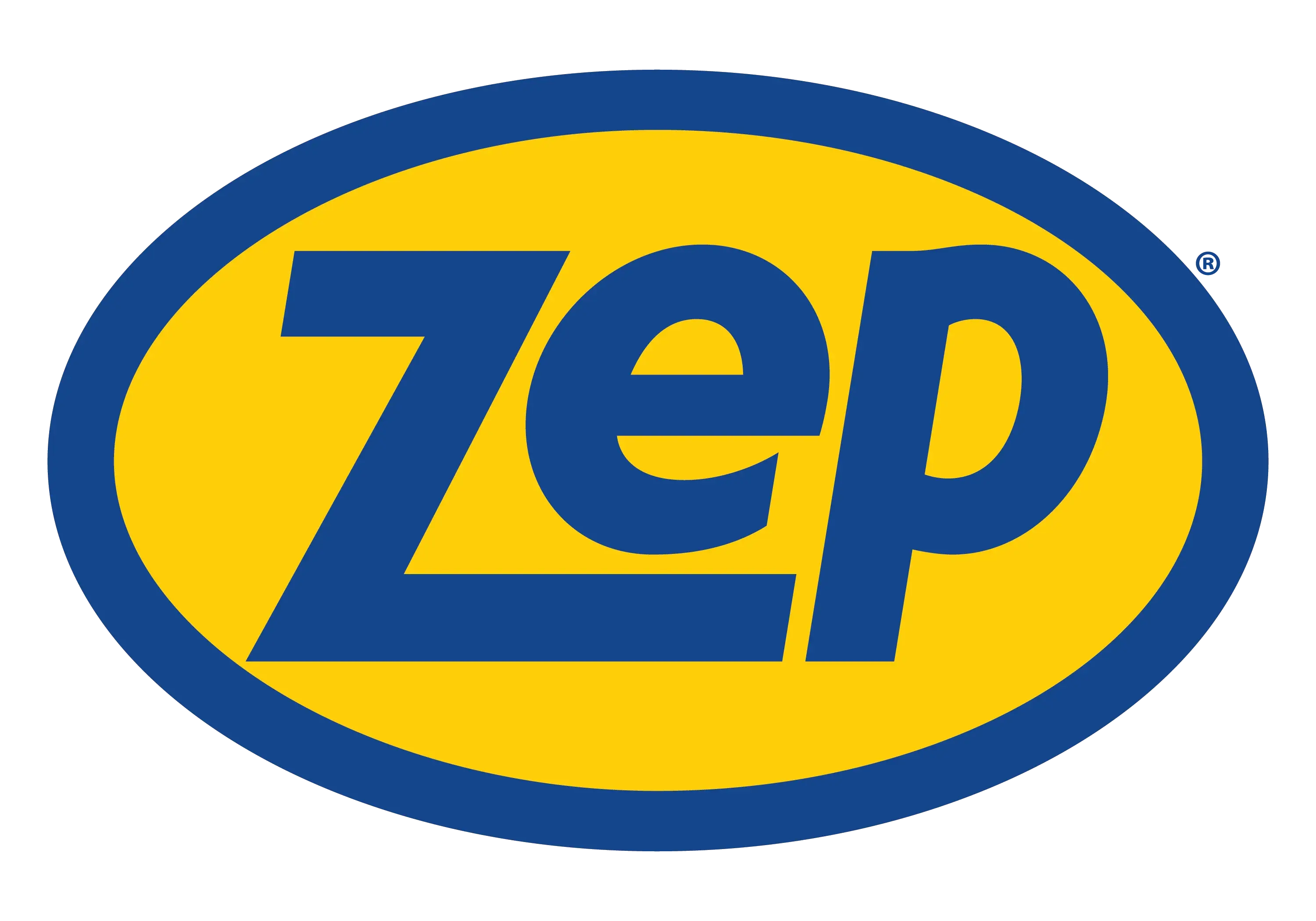
- Company type: Private
- Industry: Chemicals
- Founded: 1937; 89 years ago
- Founders: Mandle Zaban; William Eplan; Saul Powell
- Headquarters: Atlanta, Georgia, United States
- Area served: North America, Europe
- Key people: Amy Hahn (CEO)
- Products: Cleaning agents; Vehicle care; Insecticides
- Brands: List of Zep, Inc. Brands
- Number of employees: 1,400+ (2025)
- Website: zep.com

Zep, Inc. is an Atlanta, Georgia-based cleaning products manufacturer. It specializes in cleaning and maintenance products for industrial, institutional, food and beverage, vehicle care, and retail customers. Zep's product portfolio includes over 80 brands. As of 2025, Zep employs more than 1,400 people.

== History ==
Zep was founded in 1937 by Mandle Zaban, William Eplan, and Saul Powell. The company manufactured industrial and janitorial cleaning products and differentiated itself from competitors through marketing its product formulations as unique and promoting their hands-on customer service. National Linen Service acquired Zep in 1962 and shortly after changed its name to National Service Industries (NSI) to better reflect the company's offerings. Erwin Zaban, son of co-founder Mandle Zaban, stayed on to run Zep following the acquisition and went on to become president of NSI in 1966.

Zep became synonymous with NSI's chemical division, acquiring Selig Chemical Industries in 1968 and several smaller acquisitions throughout the 1970s and 1980s. Harry Maziar, whom Erwin Zaban had originally hired as a sales agent, ultimately moved up the company's ranks to succeed Zaban as the company's CEO in 1971. Maziar served as president and CEO of Zep for 27 years and led the company through significant growth.

In 1992, NSI added Graham Group, Europe's second-largest specialty chemical manufacturer at the time, and Kleen Canada to its chemical division. Zep expanded further as NSI's chemical division in 1997 with the acquisition of Enforcer Products and Pure Corporation. Enforcer manufactured pet care products and home pesticides and cleaners, providing Zep entry into the retail chemical market and leading to the development of the Zep Commercial product line.

In 2001, as a result of suppressed earnings and a weakening economy, NSI spun off its chemical and lighting divisions into their own publicly traded company. Initially incorporated as L&C Spinco in June 2001, it was renamed Acuity Brands in November of the same year. Economic conditions caused Acuity Brands to struggle initially, but restructuring efforts in 2005 improved revenues and led the company to decide to split the company into two distinct, publicly traded brands in July 2007. The chemical division, known as Acuity Specialty Products, spun off from Acuity Brands under the name Zep, Inc. and included the Zep, Zep Commercial, Enforcer, and Selig brands.

Once again an independent company, Zep, Inc. continued to expand. It acquired Waterbury Companies and Amrep in 2010 and the vehicle care division of Ecolab in 2012. A 2014 fire at an Amrep manufacturing plant in Marietta, Georgia resurfaced a history of safety and environmental issues at the facility extending back to at least 1989, long before Zep acquired the company. No one was injured or killed in the fire, and EPA air quality tests indicated that the fumes from the fire were not toxic. However, the Georgia Environmental Protection Division determined that a fish kill in Sope Creek downstream from the facility was likely the result of runoff chemicals and firefighting foam.

In April 2015, New Mountain Capital, a private equity firm, reached a $460 million acquisition agreement with Zep to take the company private. The deal was approved unanimously by Zep's board. A stockholder vote in June 2015 approved the merger with 99.3 percent of the vote in favor. In July 2017, the company added a business segment for the food and beverage industry to its portfolio of products via the acquisition of AFCO. AFCO manufactured products used for sanitation and safety in food processing. Dan Smytka, was appointed as CEO in September 2019.

In 2022, Amy Hahn was appointed as CEO.

In July 2025, Truelink Capital Management, a Los Angeles-based private equity firm, acquired Zep.

== Brands and operations ==
Zep is structured into four product categories: Retail, industrial and institutional, vehicle care, and food and beverage. The company is headquartered in Atlanta, Georgia, and maintains selling and market organizations in North America, the United Kingdom, Italy, and Benelux. Zep operates manufacturing facilities in Georgia, Texas, South Dakota, California, Pennsylvania, and Louisiana in the United States as well as facilities in Canada and Europe.

=== Brands ===
- Zep
- Zep Professional
- Country Vet
- TimeMist
- Misty
- Enforcer
- Original Bike Spirits
- Niagara National
- AFCO
- Thonhauser

== Programs and partnerships ==
Zep's vehicle care division developed a program for car wash operators in 2015. Dubbed the Assure Program, the program was intended to make commercial car wash chemical management easier and safer by providing cleaning formulations and dispensing systems that the company advertises as simpler to use and maintain. After the EPA found several Zep products effective at killing COVID-19 in 2020, Zep expanded the Assure Program's framework to develop a biosafety program. Launched in 2021, the new Zep Assure Program was designed to help organizations maintain sanitary facilities. Much like the original vehicle care program, Zep advertises the expanded Assure Program as making cleaning and sanitation management easier and safer for participating organizations by providing approved cleaning products along with consultation and training services for businesses to properly implement their use.

In 2021, Zep developed sanitation partnerships with several organizations in response to the COVID-19 pandemic, including Atlanta Public Schools as part of the school system's return to in-classroom learning. Expanding on an existing partnership that had provided hand sanitizer through APS's free meal distribution program, Zep supplied hand sanitizer to all classrooms as well as 2,000 safety kits that included face masks, tote bags, and a card with hand hygiene information. The plan also sent experts to give hand hygiene presentations and provided posters and other educational and informational material for use within the schools.
