= Lists of reality television episodes =

This is a list of lists of reality television episodes.

== Reality ==
- List of 2 Days & 1 Night episodes
- List of Acapulco Shore episodes
- List of The Apprentice Asia episodes
- List of Around The World For Free episodes
- List of Basketball Wives episodes
- List of Basketball Wives LA episodes
- List of Below Deck episodes
- List of Below Deck Mediterranean episodes
- List of Bigg Boss (Malayalam TV series) episodes
- List of The Biggest Loser Australia episodes
- List of Billy the Exterminator episodes
- List of Canada's Drag Race episodes
- List of Canada's Worst Handyman episodes
- List of Canadian Pickers episodes
- List of Car Warriors episodes
- List of Celebrity Rehab with Dr. Drew episodes
- List of Chasing Classic Cars episodes
- List of Coke Studio (Indian TV program) episodes
- List of Deadliest Warrior episodes
- List of Dirty Jobs episodes
- List of Dirty Jobs home video releases
- List of Drag Race Brasil episodes
- List of Drag Race Down Under episodes
- List of Drag Race España episodes
- List of Drag Race France episodes
- List of Drag Race Italia episodes
- List of Drag Race México episodes
- List of Drag Race Philippines episodes
- List of Food Network Challenge episodes
- List of Gold Rush episodes
- List of The Great Food Truck Race episodes
- List of Happy Together episodes
- List of Highway Patrol (Australian TV series) episodes
- List of Ikke gjør dette hjemme episodes
- List of Junior MasterChef Pinoy Edition episodes
- List of Larrymania episodes
- List of Lip Sync Battle Philippines episodes
- List of Lip Sync Battle episodes
- List of Little People, Big World episodes
- List of Live PD episodes
- List of Live Rescue episodes
- List of Man v. Food episodes
- List of Man vs. Wild episodes
- List of Mantracker episodes
- List of Manzo'd with Children episodes
- List of Marriage Boot Camp episodes
- List of Naked and Afraid episodes
- List of Nerds FC episodes
- List of Next Great Baker episodes
- List of Paris Hilton's Dubai BFF episodes
- List of The Real Housewives of Vancouver episodes
- List of The Riveras episodes
- List of Rob & Big episodes
- List of Rob Dyrdek's Fantasy Factory episodes
- List of Scream Queens (2008 TV series) episodes
- List of Silent Library episodes
- List of Singing Battle episodes
- List of Sons of Guns episodes
- List of Supernanny (American TV series) episodes
- List of Supernanny episodes
- List of Three Sheets episodes
- List of Top Singer episodes
- List of Tosh.0 episodes
- List of Total Divas episodes
- List of Tough as Nails episodes
- List of Tvoje lice zvuči poznato (Croatian TV series) episodes
- List of Undercover Boss Australia episodes
- List of Warsaw Shore episodes
- List of Wicked Tuna episodes
- List of Wicked Tuna: Outer Banks episodes
- List of Wrecked: Life in the Crash Lane episodes

== American reality ==
- List of 16 and Pregnant episodes
- List of 19 Kids and Counting episodes
- List of 90 Day Fiancé episodes
- List of 90 Day Fiancé: Happily Ever After? episodes
- List of Alone episodes
- List of The Amazing Race (American TV series) episodes
- List of The Amazing Race (American TV series) episodes (seasons 1–20)
- List of America's Next Top Model episodes
- List of American Chopper episodes
- List of American Chopper: Senior vs. Junior episodes
- List of American Idol episodes
- List of American Pickers episodes
- List of American Restoration episodes
- List of Ax Men episodes
- List of Bachelor in Paradise (American TV series) episodes
- List of The Bachelor (American TV series) episodes
- List of The Bachelorette (American TV series) episodes
- List of Bad Girls Club episodes
- List of Bar Rescue episodes
- List of Beat Shazam episodes
- List of Bering Sea Gold episodes
- List of Bert the Conqueror episodes
- List of Bethenny Ever After episodes
- List of Big Brother (American TV series) episodes (2000–2009)
- List of Big Brother (American TV series) episodes (2010–2019)
- List of Big Brother (American TV series) episodes (2020–present)
- List of Black Ink Crew episodes
- List of Braxton Family Values episodes
- List of Bully Beatdown episodes
- List of Cajun Pawn Stars episodes
- List of Cake Boss episodes
- List of The Carbonaro Effect episodes
- List of Celebrity Big Brother (American TV series) episodes
- List of The Challenge (TV series) episodes
- List of The Challenge (TV series) episodes (seasons 1–15)
- List of The Challenge (TV series) episodes (seasons 16–30)
- List of The Challenge (TV series) episodes (seasons 31–present)
- List of Chopped Sweets episodes
- List of Chrisley Knows Best episodes
- List of The Circle (American TV series) episodes
- List of The City (2008 TV series) episodes
- List of Comic Book Men episodes
- List of The Curse of Oak Island episodes
- List of Dance Moms episodes
- List of Deadliest Catch episodes
- List of Diners, Drive-Ins and Dives episodes
- List of Don't Be Tardy... episodes
- List of Drinking Made Easy episodes
- List of Ellen's Game of Games episodes
- List of Ex on the Beach (American TV series) episodes
- List of Extreme Makeover: Home Edition episodes
- List of Fear Factor (American TV series) episodes
- List of Forged in Fire episodes
- List of The Girls Next Door episodes
- List of Hardcore Pawn episodes
- List of Hell's Kitchen (American TV series) episodes
- List of The Hills episodes
- List of Holiday Baking Championship episodes
- List of Ice Road Truckers episodes
- List of Jackass episodes
- List of Jersey Shore episodes
- List of Joseline's Cabaret episodes
- List of Kate Plus 8 episodes
- List of Kathy Griffin: My Life on the D-List episodes
- List of Keeping Up with the Kardashians episodes
- List of Kid Nation episodes
- List of Laguna Beach: The Real Orange County episodes
- List of Love Is Blind (American TV series) episodes
- List of Love Is Blind: UK episodes
- List of Love Island USA episodes
- List of On Patrol: Live and On Patrol: First Shift episodes
- List of Summer House (2017 TV series) episodes
- List of Wife Swap (American TV series) episodes
- List of Lockup episodes
- List of Love & Hip Hop television specials
- List of Love & Hip Hop: Miami episodes
- List of Love & Hip Hop: New York episodes
- List of Love & Hip Hop: Atlanta episodes
- List of Love & Hip Hop: Hollywood episodes
- List of Married to Medicine episodes
- List of The Masked Singer (American TV series) episodes
- List of Million Dollar Listing Los Angeles episodes
- List of Mob Wives episodes
- List of Moonshiners episodes
- List of Mountain Men episodes
- List of My 600-lb Life episodes
- List of My Super Sweet 16 episodes
- List of Orange County Choppers episodes
- List of The Osbournes episodes
- List of Pawn Stars episodes
- List of Perfect Match (TV series) episodes
- List of The Profit episodes
- List of Punk'd episodes
- List of The Real Housewives of Atlanta episodes
- List of The Real Housewives of Beverly Hills episodes
- List of The Real Housewives of Dallas episodes
- List of The Real Housewives of Dubai episodes
- List of The Real Housewives of Miami episodes
- List of The Real Housewives of New Jersey episodes
- List of The Real Housewives of New York City episodes
- List of The Real Housewives of Orange County episodes
- List of The Real Housewives of Potomac episodes
- List of The Real Housewives of Salt Lake City episodes
- List of RuPaul's Drag Race episodes
- List of RuPaul's Drag Race All Stars episodes
- List of RuPaul's Drag U episodes
- List of Say Yes to the Dress episodes
- List of Secret Millionaire (American TV series) episodes
- List of Shahs of Sunset episodes
- List of Shipping Wars episodes
- List of The Simple Life episodes
- List of Sister Wives episodes
- List of Snooki & Jwoww episodes
- List of Southern Charm episodes
- List of Storage Wars: New York episodes
- List of Storage Wars: Texas episodes
- List of Storage Wars episodes
- List of Survivor (American TV series) episodes (seasons 1–20)
- List of Survivor (American TV series) episodes (seasons 21–40)
- List of Survivor (American TV series) episodes (seasons 41–present)
- List of Swamp People episodes (season 1–10)
- List of Swamp People episodes (season 11–present)
- List of The Tester episodes
- List of Toddlers & Tiaras episodes
- List of Undercover Boss (American TV series) episodes
- List of Vanderpump Rules episodes
- List of The Vanilla Ice Project episodes
- List of Wahlburgers episodes
