= Troubled Waters =

Troubled Waters or Troubled Water may refer to:

== Film ==
- Troubled Waters (1921 film), Swedish drama film
- Troubled Waters (1936 film), British mystery, directed by Albert Parker
- Troubled Waters (1964 film), British crime drama, directed by Stanley Goulder
- Troubled Waters (2006 film), Canadian thriller

== Literature ==
- Troubled Waters, an 1864 novel by Clara Lucas Balfour
- Troubled Waters, the 1981 English translation title of Nigorie, an 1895 short story by Ichiyō Higuchi
- Troubled Waters, a 1915 novel by Bertrand William Sinclair
- Troubled Waters, a 1925 novel by William MacLeod Raine
- Troubled Waters (Vercel novel), a 1935 novel by Roger Vercel
- Troubled Waters, a 1959 novel by Robert Leckie under the pseudonym Roger Barlow, the sixth installment in the Sandy Steele Adventures series
- Troubled Waters: The Story of a Fish, a Stream and a Pond, a 1969 novel by Daniel P. Mannix
- Troubled Waters, a 1975 novel by Susan Sallis
- Troubled Waters, a 1982 novel by Elizabeth Lemarchand
- Troubled Waters, a 1988 short story anthology edited by C. J. Cherryh, the third anthology and the fifth overall installment in the science fiction series Merovingen Nights
- Troubled Waters, a 1997 novel by Carolyn Wheat
- Troubled Waters: An Unauthorised and Unofficial Guide to "Dawson's Creek", a 2001 non-fiction book about the TV series by Scott K. Andrews
- Troubled Waters, a 2002 novel by Rosie Harris
- Troubled Waters, a 2002 novel by Dean Hughes, the second installment in the Hearts of the Children series
- Troubled Waters, a 2003 novel by Rosemary Hayes, the first installment in the Troubled Waters trilogy
- Troubled Waters, a 2003 novel by Warren Murphy and Richard Sapir, the 133rd overall installment in The Destroyer novel series
- Troubled Waters, a 2004 novel by Claire Lorrimer
- Troubled Waters, a 2007 novel attributed to Carolyn Keene, the 23rd installment in the Nancy Drew: Girl Detective series
- Troubled Waters, a 2008 novel by Dewey Lambdin, the 14th installment in the Alan Lewrie series
- Troubled Waters, a 2010 novel by Sharon Shinn, the first installment in the Elemental Blessings series
- Troubled Waters, a 2014 novel by Gillian Galbraith, the sixth installment in the Alice Rice series

== Music ==
- "Troubled Waters", a song by Chris Brown from Indigo, 2019
- "Troubled Waters" (Victor Crone song), 2020

== Television ==
- "Troubled Waters", 90 Day Fiancé: Happily Ever After? season 6, episode 7 (2021)
- "Troubled Waters (Part 1)", A Country Practice season 13, episode 61 (1993)
- "Troubled Waters (Part 2)", A Country Practice season 13, episode 62 (1993)
- "Troubled Waters", American Chopper: Senior vs. Junior season 4, episode 12 (2012)
- "Troubled Waters", Assignment: Underwater episode 12 (1960)
- "Troubled Waters", Badger series 2, episode 1 (2000)
- "Troubled Waters", Big Shrimpin' episode 4 (2011)
- "Troubled Waters", Brothers & Sisters season 3, episodes 16–17 (2009)
- "Troubled Waters", Columbo season 4, episode 4 (1975)
- "Troubled Waters", Disappeared season 9, episode 3 (2018)
- "Troubled Waters", Falcon Crest season 2, episode 3 (1982)
- "Troubled Waters", Fireman Sam series 9, episode 6 (2014)
- "Troubled Waters", Heartbeat series 16, episode 22 (2007)
- "Troubled Waters", Holmes Inspection season 1, episode 7 (2009)
- "Troubled Waters", Hugh and I series 6, episode 1 (1966)
- "Troubled Waters", Lassie (1954) season 17, episode 19 (1971)
- "Troubled Waters", Little People, Big World season 7, episode 9 (2009)
- "Troubled Waters", Moonshiners season 2, episode 8 (2013)
- "Troubled Waters", Rise of Empires: Ottoman season 2, episode 2 (2022)
- "Troubled Waters", Sisters season 2, episode 13 (1992)
- "Troubled Waters", Strange Days on Planet Earth episode 4 (2005)
- "Troubled Waters", Superboy season 1, episode 10 (1988)
- "Troubled Waters", Tenko and the Guardians of the Magic episode 9 (1995)
- "Troubled Waters", The Legend of Calamity Jane episode 8 (1998)
- "Troubled Waters", The Lone Ranger (1949) season 1, episode 26 (1950)
- "Troubled Waters", The Real World: Key West episode 5 (2006)
- "Troubled Waters", Valt the Wonder Deer season 1, episode 17 (2016)
- "Troubled Waters", Waterfront episode 12 (1954)
- "Troubled Waters", Waterloo Road series 8, episode 3 (2012)

== See also ==
- Trouble the Water, a 2008 American documentary film by Tia Lessin and Carl Deal
- Trouble the Water (album), a 2022 studio album by Show Me the Body
- Troubled Water, 2008 Norwegian film
- Bridge over Troubled Water (disambiguation)
