= The Vanilla Ice Project =

- Genre: Reality
- Starring: Vanilla Ice
- Country of origin: United States
- Original language: English
- No. of seasons: 9
- No. of episodes: 105 (list of episodes)

Production
- Executive producers: Matthew Levine; Timothy T.P. Robbins; Max Weissman
- Running time: 30 minutes
- Production company: Departure Films

Original release
- Network: DIY Network
- Release: October 14, 2010 – September 7, 2019

The Vanilla Ice Project is an American reality television series on the DIY Network. It is hosted by construction contractor and rapper Rob Van Winkle, a.k.a. Vanilla Ice, who has significant experience with home improvement and real estate flipping. Ice began purchasing houses in his early twenties and became more involved in home improvement projects starting around 1998.

== Production ==
The series premiered on October 14, 2010, with the initial season continuing until January 1, 2011. Season 2 of The Vanilla Ice Project started on January 21, 2012, and featured a new house and more up-to-date and state-of-the-art improvements. To mark the premiere, Vanilla Ice posted live Tweets during the show on Twitter, answering fan questions and commenting on the show.

Due to the success of the show, Vanilla Ice launched a training course that aims to help others succeed at real estate investing.

== Episodes ==
Season	Episodes	Originally released	
Season	Episodes	First released	Last released
1	11	October 14, 2010	January 1, 2011
2	13	January 21, 2012	April 7, 2012
3	13	January 27, 2013	April 28, 2013
4	13	March 8, 2014	May 10, 2014
5	13	April 4, 2015	June 20, 2015
6	13	April 23, 2016	July 9, 2016
7	13	July 15, 2017	September 30, 2017
8	10	August 11, 2018	October 6, 2018
9	6	July 27, 2019	August 31, 2019
Specials		January 21, 2012	September 7, 2019

== Awards ==
In addition to winning the Telly Award, the Factual Entertainment Award and Hermes Platinum Press Award, the first season of The Vanilla Ice Project was selected as a finalist for the Cable Fax Awards.

== Home media ==
A deluxe edition DVD box set of the first season was released in late 2016. This included deleted scenes as well as a bonus episode that follows Vanilla Ice and his long-time friend Dave Whitman as they remodel Whitman's home in Pennsylvania. The series is available to stream on Discovery+.
