= Bridge over Troubled Water (disambiguation) =

Bridge over Troubled Water is a 1970 album by Simon & Garfunkel

Bridge over Troubled Water may also refer to:

== Music ==
- "Bridge over Troubled Water" (song), the title track from the album
- Bridge over Troubled Water (Paul Desmond album), an album of Simon and Garfunkel songs by Paul Desmond
- Bridge over Troubled Water (Peggy Lee album), an album by Peggy Lee

== Television ==
- "Bridge Over Troubled Water", Auf Wiedersehen, Pet series 3, episode 3 (2002)
- "Bridge Over Troubled Water", Big Timber season 1, episode 2 (2020)
- "Bridge Over Troubled Water", Mistresses (American) season 4, episode 8 (2016)
- "Bridge Over Troubled Water", One Tree Hill season 6, episode 4 (2008)
- "Bridge over Troubled Water", Southern Charm Savannah season 1, episode 6 (2017)

== See also ==
- Troubled Waters (disambiguation)
