= List of Bachelor in Paradise (American TV series) episodes =

Bachelor in Paradise is an American reality dating competition television series created for ABC. It is hosted by Jesse Palmer, and is a spin-off of The Bachelor and The Bachelorette. The series is produced by Next Entertainment in association with Warner Horizon Television, and features previous contestants from The Bachelor and The Bachelorette isolated in a romantic paradise in an exotic tropical destination competing to find their true love.

As of September 2, 2025, 110 episodes of Bachelor in Paradise have aired, concluding the tenth season. The ninth season premiered on September 28, 2023.

== Series overview ==
Season	Episodes	Originally released	
Season	Episodes	First released	Last released
1	7	August 4, 2014	September 8, 2014
2	12	August 2, 2015	September 8, 2015
3	11	August 2, 2016	September 6, 2016
4	9	August 14, 2017	September 11, 2017
5	11	August 7, 2018	September 11, 2018
6	13	August 5, 2019	September 17, 2019
7	11	August 16, 2021	October 5, 2021
8	16	September 27, 2022	November 22, 2022
9	10	September 28, 2023	December 7, 2023
10	10	July 7, 2025	September 2, 2025

== Episodes ==
=== Season 1 (2014) ===
No. overall	No. in season	Title	Original release date	Prod. code	U.S. viewers (millions)	Rating/share (18–49)
1	1	"Week 1: Series Premiere"	August 4, 2014	101	5.31	1.4/5
2	2	"Week 2"	August 11, 2014	102	5.31	1.5/5
3	3	"Week 3"	August 18, 2014	103	5.06	1.3/4
4	4	"Week 4"	August 25, 2014	104	4.84	1.3/4
5	5	"Week 5"	August 26, 2014	105	5.07	1.4/5
6	6	"Week 6"	September 1, 2014	106	5.01	1.3/4
7	7	"Week 7"	September 8, 2014	107	5.40	1.4/4

=== Season 2 (2015) ===
No. overall	No. in season	Title	Original release date	Prod. code	U.S. viewers (millions)	Rating/share (18–49)
8	1	"Week 1: Part 1 (Season Premiere)"	August 2, 2015	201A	3.60	1.1/4
9	2	"Week 1: Part 2"	August 3, 2015	201B	4.66	1.3/5
10	3	"Week 2: Part 1"	August 9, 2015	202A	3.76	1.2/4
11	4	"Week 2: Part 2"	August 10, 2015	202B	5.09	1.5/6
12	5	"Week 3: Part 1"	August 16, 2015	203A	3.98	1.3/5
13	6	"Week 3: Part 2"	August 17, 2015	203B	5.24	1.5/6
14	7	"Week 4: Part 1"	August 23, 2015	204A	4.21	1.3/4
15	8	"Week 4: Part 2"	August 24, 2015	204B	5.58	1.8/6
16	9	"Week 5: Part 1"	August 30, 2015	205A	4.40	1.3/4
17	10	"Week 5: Part 2"	August 31, 2015	205B	5.24	1.5/6
18	11	"Week 6: Part 1"	September 6, 2015	206A	3.88	1.1/4
19	12	"Week 6: Part 2 (Season Finale)"	September 7, 2015	206B	4.82	1.5/4

=== Season 3 (2016) ===
No. overall	No. in season	Title	Original release date	Prod. code	U.S. viewers (millions)	Rating/share (18–49)
20	1	"Week 1: Season Premiere"	August 2, 2016	301	4.63	1.4/5
21	2	"Week 2, Night 1"	August 8, 2016	302A	4.54	1.4/5
22	3	"Week 2, Night 2"	August 9, 2016	302B	3.86	1.1/4
23	4	"Week 3, Night 1"	August 15, 2016	303A	4.74	1.4/5
24	5	"Week 3, Night 2"	August 16, 2016	303B	4.41	1.3/5
25	6	"Week 4, Night 1"	August 22, 2016	304A	5.21	1.6/6
26	7	"Week 4, Night 2"	August 23, 2016	304B	4.85	1.4/6
27	8	"Week 5, Night 1"	August 29, 2016	305A	5.46	1.6/6
28	9	"Week 5, Night 2"	August 30, 2016	305B	5.04	1.4/6
29	10	"Week 6, Night 1"	September 5, 2016	306A	4.96	1.4/5
30	11	"Season Finale: Week 6, Night 2"	September 6, 2016	306B	5.57	1.6/6

=== Season 4 (2017) ===
No. overall	No. in season	Title	Original release date	Prod. code	U.S. viewers (millions)	Rating/share (18–49)
31	1	"Week 1: Season Premiere"	August 14, 2017	401A	5.09	1.6/6
32	2	"Week 1: Part 2"	August 15, 2017	401B	3.88	1.1/4
33	3	"Week 2: Part 1"	August 21, 2017	402A	4.33	1.3/5
34	4	"Week 2: Part 2"	August 22, 2017	402B	3.80	1.1/4
35	5	"Week 3: Part 1"	August 28, 2017	403A	5.45	1.7/6
36	6	"Week 3: Part 2"	August 29, 2017	403B	4.36	1.3/5
37	7	"Week 4: Part 1"	September 4, 2017	404A	4.51	1.3/5
38	8	"Week 4: Part 2"	September 5, 2017	404B	4.54	1.3/5
39	9	"Week 5: Season Finale"	September 11, 2017	405A	4.70	1.3/5

=== Season 5 (2018) ===
No. overall	No. in season	Title	Original release date	Prod. code	U.S. viewers (millions)	Rating/share (18–49)
40	1	"Week 1: Season Premiere"	August 7, 2018	501	3.82	1.1/5
41	2	"Week 2: Part 1"	August 13, 2018	502A	4.54	1.3/6
42	3	"Week 2: Part 2"	August 14, 2018	502B	3.93	1.0/5
43	4	"Week 3: Part 1"	August 20, 2018	503A	4.60	1.3/6
44	5	"Week 3: Part 2"	August 21, 2018	503B	3.97	1.1/5
45	6	"Week 4: Part 1"	August 27, 2018	504A	4.61	1.2/6
46	7	"Week 4: Part 2"	August 28, 2018	504B	4.16	1.1/5
47	8	"Week 5: Part 1"	September 3, 2018	505A	4.20	1.1/5
48	9	"Week 5: Part 2"	September 4, 2018	505B	3.93	1.0/4
49	10	"Week 6: Part 1"	September 10, 2018	506A	4.23	1.1/5
50	11	"Week 6: Part 2 (Season Finale)"	September 11, 2018	506B	4.55	1.2/5

=== Season 6 (2019) ===
No. overall	No. in season	Title	Original release date	Prod. code	U.S. viewers (millions)	Rating/share (18–49)
51	1	"Week 1: Part 1 (Season Premiere)"	August 5, 2019	601A	4.36	1.3/7
52	2	"Week 1: Part 2"	August 6, 2019	601B	3.56	1.1/6
53	3	"Week 2: Part 1"	August 12, 2019	602A	4.33	1.2/6
54	4	"Week 2: Part 2"	August 13, 2019	602B	4.07	1.1/6
55	5	"Week 3: Part 1"	August 19, 2019	603A	4.78	1.3/7
56	6	"Week 3: Part 2"	August 20, 2019	603B	4.12	1.1/6
57	7	"Week 4: Part 1"	August 26, 2019	604A	4.59	1.2/6
58	8	"Week 4: Part 2"	August 27, 2019	604B	3.95	1.1/6
59	9	"Week 5: Part 1"	September 2, 2019	605A	4.02	1.1/5
60	10	"Week 5: Part 2"	September 3, 2019	605B	4.05	1.1/6
61	11	"Week 6: Part 1"	September 9, 2019	606A	4.39	1.2/6
62	12	"Week 6: Part 2"	September 10, 2019	606B	4.14	1.1/5
63	13	"Week 7: Season Finale"	September 17, 2019	607	4.38	1.3/7

=== Season 7 (2021) ===
No. overall	No. in season	Title	Original release date	Prod. code	U.S. viewers (millions)	Rating/share (18–49)
64	1	"Week 1: Season Premiere"	August 16, 2021	701	3.23	0.9/7
65	2	"Week 2: Part 1"	August 23, 2021	702	3.41	1.0/5
66	3	"Week 2: Part 2"	August 24, 2021	703	2.78	0.8/4
67	4	"Week 3: Part 1"	August 30, 2021	704	3.39	0.9/7
68	5	"Week 3: Part 2"	August 31, 2021	705	2.70	0.7/4
69	6	"Week 4: Part 1"	September 6, 2021	706	3.12	0.8
70	7	"Week 4: Part 2"	September 7, 2021	707	3.10	0.7
71	8	"Week 5"	September 14, 2021	708	3.21	1.0
72	9	"Week 6"	September 21, 2021	709	3.18	0.9
73	10	"Week 7"	September 28, 2021	710	2.82	0.7
74	11	"Week 8: Season Finale"	October 5, 2021	711	2.91	0.7

=== Season 8 (2022) ===
No. overall	No. in season	Title	Original release date	Prod. code	U.S. viewers (millions)	Rating/share (18–49)
75	1	"Episode 1: Season Premiere"	September 27, 2022	801	2.60	0.7
76	2	"Episode 2"	October 3, 2022	802	2.15	0.6
77	3	"Episode 3"	October 4, 2022	803	2.15	0.5
78	4	"Episode 4"	October 10, 2022	804	1.93	0.4
79	5	"Episode 5"	October 11, 2022	805	2.11	0.6
80	6	"Episode 6"	October 17, 2022	806	2.09	0.5
81	7	"Episode 7"	October 18, 2022	807	2.25	0.6
82	8	"Episode 8"	October 24, 2022	808	2.37	0.6
83	9	"Episode 9"	October 25, 2022	809	2.58	0.6
84	10	"Episode 10"	October 31, 2022	810	2.31	0.5
85	11	"Episode 11"	November 1, 2022	811	2.31	0.5
86	12	"Episode 12"	November 7, 2022	812	2.46	0.6
87	13	"Episode 13"	November 14, 2022	813	2.28	0.5
88	14	"Episode 14"	November 15, 2022	814	2.35	0.5
89	15	"Season Finale: Part 1"	November 21, 2022	815	2.53	0.5
90	16	"Season Finale: Part 2"	November 22, 2022	816	2.62	0.6

=== Season 9 (2023) ===
No. overall	No. in season	Title	Original release date	Prod. code	U.S. viewers (millions)	Rating/share (18–49)
91	1	"Episode 1: Season Premiere"	September 28, 2023	901	2.08	0.4
92	2	"Episode 2"	October 5, 2023	902	2.00	0.4
93	3	"Episode 3"	October 12, 2023	903	1.89	0.3
94	4	"Episode 4"	October 19, 2023	904	1.99	0.3
95	5	"Episode 5"	October 26, 2023	905	1.91	0.3
96	6	"Episode 6"	November 2, 2023	906	1.96	0.3
97	7	"Episode 7"	November 9, 2023	907	1.93	0.3
98	8	"Episode 8"	November 16, 2023	908	2.24	0.4
99	9	"Episode 9"	November 30, 2023	909	2.25	0.3
100	10	"Season Finale"	December 7, 2023	910	1.74	0.3

=== Season 10 (2025) ===
No. overall	No. in season	Title	Original release date	Prod. code	U.S. viewers (millions)	Rating/share (18–49)
101	1	"Episode 1: Season Premiere"	July 7, 2025	1001	1.84	0.3/6
102	2	"Episode 2"	July 14, 2025	1002	1.44	0.2/3
103	3	"Episode 3"	July 15, 2025	1003	1.48	0.2/3
104	4	"Episode 4"	July 21, 2025	1004	1.82	0.3/5
105	5	"Episode 5"	July 28, 2025	1005	1.81	0.3/4
106	6	"Episode 6"	August 4, 2025	1006	1.88	0.3/5
107	7	"Episode 7"	August 11, 2025	1007	2.04	0.3/6
108	8	"Episode 8"	August 18, 2025	1008	1.98	0.3/5
109	9	"Episode 9"	August 25, 2025	1009	1.93	0.3/5
110	10	"Season Finale"	September 2, 2025	1010	1.78	0.2/4
