= List of Acapulco Shore episodes =

The following is a list of episodes for the Mexican television programme, Acapulco Shore that first aired on MTV on September 27, 2014.

Series	Episodes	Originally aired	
Series	Episodes	First aired	Last aired
1	11 +1 special	September 27, 2014	December 6, 2014
2	12 +1 special	May 19, 2015	August 11, 2015
3	12 +2 specials	May 17, 2016	August 16, 2016
4	12	April 11, 2017	June 27, 2017
5	12	April 17, 2018	July 3, 2018
6	15	April 30, 2019	August 30, 2019
7	17	June 2, 2020	September 29, 2020
8	15	April 27, 2021	August 3, 2021
9	14	January 18, 2022	April 19, 2022
10	12	September 27, 2022	December 13, 2022
11	13	September 5, 2023	November 28, 2023

== Episodes ==
=== Series 1 (2014) ===
No. overall	No. in season	Title	Duration	Original release date
1	1	"Episode 1"	60 minutes	27 September 2014
2	2	"Episode 2"	60 minutes	27 September 2014
3	3	"Episode 3"	60 minutes	4 October 2014
4	4	"Episode 4"	60 minutes	11 October 2014
5	5	"Episode 5"	60 minutes	18 October 2014
6	6	"Episode 6"	60 minutes	25 October 2014
7	7	"Episode 7"	60 minutes	1 November 2014
8	8	"Episode 8"	60 minutes	8 November 2014
9	9	"Episode 9"	60 minutes	15 November 2014
10	10	"Episode 10"	60 minutes	22 November 2014
11	11	"Episode 11"	60 minutes	29 November 2014
12	12	"The Reunion"	60 minutes	6 December 2014

=== Series 2 (2015) ===
No. overall	No. in season	Title	Duration	Original release date
13	1	"Episode 1"	60 minutes	19 May 2015
15	2	"Episode 2"	60 minutes	26 May 2015
15	3	"Episode 3"	60 minutes	2 June 2015
16	4	"Episode 4"	60 minutes	9 June 2015
17	5	"Episode 5"	60 minutes	16 June 2015
18	6	"Episode 6"	60 minutes	23 June 2015
19	7	"Episode 7"	60 minutes	30 June 2015
20	8	"Episode 8"	60 minutes	7 July 2015
21	9	"Episode 9"	60 minutes	14 July 2015
22	10	"Episode 10"	60 minutes	21 July 2015
23	11	"Episode 11"	60 minutes	28 July 2015
24	12	"Episode 12"	60 minutes	4 August 2015
25	13	"The Reunion"	60 minutes	11 August 2015

=== Series 3 (2016) ===
No. overall	No. in season	Title	Duration	Original release date
26	1	"Episode 1"	60 minutes	17 May 2016
27	2	"Episode 2"	60 minutes	24 May 2016
28	3	"Episode 3"	60 minutes	31 May 2016
29	4	"Episode 4"	60 minutes	7 June 2016
30	5	"Episode 5"	60 minutes	14 June 2016
31	6	"Episode 6"	60 minutes	21 June 2016
32	7	"Episode 7"	60 minutes	28 June 2016
33	8	"Episode 8"	60 minutes	5 July 2016
34	9	"Episode 9"	60 minutes	12 July 2016
35	10	"Episode 10"	60 minutes	19 July 2016
36	11	"Episode 11"	60 minutes	26 July 2016
37	12	"Episode 12"	60 minutes	2 August 2016
38	13	"The Reunion, Part I"	60 minutes	9 August 2016
39	14	"The Reunion, Part II"	60 minutes	16 August 2016

=== Series 4 (2017) ===
No. overall	No. in season	Title	Duration	Original release date
40	1	"Episode 1"	60 minutes	11 April 2017
41	2	"Episode 2"	60 minutes	18 April 2017
42	3	"Episode 3"	60 minutes	25 April 2017
43	4	"Episode 4"	60 minutes	2 May 2017
44	5	"Episode 5"	60 minutes	9 May 2017
45	6	"Episode 6"	60 minutes	16 May 2017
46	7	"Episode 7"	60 minutes	23 May 2017
47	8	"Episode 8"	60 minutes	30 May 2017
48	9	"Episode 9"	60 minutes	6 August 2017
49	10	"Episode 10"	60 minutes	13 June 2017
50	11	"Episode 11"	60 minutes	20 June 2017
51	12	"Episode 12"	60 minutes	27 July 2017

=== Series 5 (2018) ===
No. overall	No. in season	Title	Duration	Original release date
52	1	"Episode 1"	60 minutes	17 April 2018
53	2	"Episode 2"	60 minutes	24 April 2018
54	3	"Episode 3"	60 minutes	1 May 2018
55	4	"Episode 4"	60 minutes	8 May 2018
56	5	"Episode 5"	60 minutes	15 May 2018
57	6	"Episode 6"	60 minutes	22 May 2018
58	7	"Episode 7"	60 minutes	29 May 2018
59	8	"Episode 8"	60 minutes	5 June 2018
60	9	"Episode 9"	60 minutes	12 June 2018
61	10	"Episode 10"	60 minutes	19 June 2018
62	11	"Episode 11"	60 minutes	26 June 2018
63	12	"Episode 12"	60 minutes	3 July 2018

=== Series 6 (2019) ===
No. overall	No. in season	Title	Duration	Original release date
64	1	"The Holidays Start"	60 minutes	30 April 2019
65	2	"Episode 2"	60 minutes	7 May 2019
66	3	"Episode 3"	60 minutes	14 May 2019
67	4	"Episode 4"	60 minutes	21 May 2019
68	5	"A very gay night"	60 minutes	28 May 2019
69	6	"The Farewell"	60 minutes	4 June 2019
70	7	"Episode 7"	60 minutes	11 June 2019
71	8	"Party in Acapulco"	60 minutes	18 June 2019
72	9	"Episode 9"	60 minutes	25 June 2019
73	10	"Episode 10"	60 minutes	2 July 2019
74	11	"The Polyamory"	60 minutes	9 July 2019
75	12	"Episode 12"	60 minutes	16 July 2019
76	13	"Episode 13"	60 minutes	23 July 2019
77	14	"Episode 14"	60 minutes	30 July 2019
78	15	"Talía's betrayal"	60 minutes	6 August 2019

=== Series 7 (2020) ===
No. overall	No. in season	Title	Duration	Original release date
79	1	"It's the Start of the Vacations"	60 minutes	2 June 2020
80	2	"Courtesy Act"	60 minutes	9 June 2020
81	3	"Here's The One That Can't Make It Happen"	60 minutes	16 June 2020
82	4	"The Pitoflon Curse"	60 minutes	23 June 2020
83	5	"It Was Just Hot Dogs"	60 minutes	30 June 2020
84	6	"The Apology Tour"	60 minutes	7 July 2020
85	7	"The Exam"	60 minutes	14 July 2020
86	8	"Let's Go and Fight Again"	60 minutes	21 July 2020
87	9	"Mister Dead D***"	60 minutes	28 July 2020
88	10	"The Witches Are Here"	60 minutes	4 August 2020
89	11	"One First Goodbye"	60 minutes	11 August 2020
90	12	"Viva Carnival!"	60 minutes	18 August 2020
91	13	"Time For Witchcraft"	60 minutes	25 August 2020
92	14	"We Have to Talk"	60 minutes	1 September 2020
93	15	"A Very Steamy Kiss"	60 minutes	8 September 2020
94	16	"One Last Hurrah"	60 minutes	22 September 2020
95	17	"The Engagement"	60 minutes	29 September 2020

=== Series 8 (2021) ===
No. overall	No. in season	Title	Duration	Original release date
96	1	"Let The Holidays Begin"	60 minutes	27 April 2021
97	2	"An Eternal Party"	60 minutes	4 May 2021
98	3	"A Night of Passion"	60 minutes	11 May 2021
99	4	"Women on the Attack"	60 minutes	18 May 2021
100	5	"And The Fight Begins"	60 minutes	25 May 2021
101	6	"Team Tendo In Crisis"	60 minutes	1 June 2021
102	7	"Karime's XV Party"	60 minutes	8 June 2021
103	8	"It's A Burning House"	60 minutes	15 June 2021
104	9	"A Very Shore Pride"	60 minutes	22 June 2021
105	10	"Welcome And Farewell"	60 minutes	29 June 2021
106	11	"Brazilian Party"	60 minutes	6 July 2021
107	12	"The Trial"	60 minutes	13 July 2021
108	13	"The Expulsion"	60 minutes	20 July 2021
109	14	"Surprise Guests"	60 minutes	27 July 2021
110	15	"The Final Party"	60 minutes	3 August 2021

=== Series 9 (2022) ===
No. overall	No. in season	Title	Original release date
111	1	"It's The Vacation After The Vacation"	18 January 2022
112	2	"Bad Decisions"	25 January 2022
113	3	"Surprise Date"	1 February 2022
114	4	"Love at First Sight"	8 February 2022
115	5	"Cheers to Polyamory!"	15 February 2022
116	6	"Chilangazo Time!"	22 February 2022
117	7	"Awkward Situations"	1 March 2022
118	8	"Bad Advice"	8 March 2022
119	9	"The Big Banquet"	15 March 2022
120	10	"Thank You For Coming"	22 March 2022
121	11	"A Wild Birthday Party"	29 March 2022
122	12	"Mirror Games"	5 April 2022
123	13	"Viva Cartagena!"	12 April 2022
124	14	"See You Later"	19 April 2022

=== Series 10 (2022) ===
No. overall	No. in season	Title	Duration	Original release date
125	1	"A New Family Was Born"	60 minutes	27 September 2022
126	2	"Just Maximum Partying"	60 minutes	4 October 2022
127	3	"Royal Rumble"	60 minutes	11 October 2022
128	4	"Evictions And Arrivals"	60 minutes	18 October 2022
129	5	"Your Ex Is Here"	60 minutes	25 October 2022
130	6	"Family Reunion"	60 minutes	1 November 2022
131	7	"A Very Shore Birthday"	60 minutes	8 November 2022
132	8	"Happy Pride!"	60 minutes	15 November 2022
133	9	"Surprise, We're Back Together"	60 minutes	22 November 2022
134	10	"Girl's Night Out"	60 minutes	29 November 2022
135	11	"An Anticipated Farewell"	60 minutes	6 December 2022
136	12	"The Final Party"	60 minutes	13 December 2022

=== Series 11 (2023) ===
No. overall	No. in season	Title	Duration	Original release date
137	1	"Partying In Acapulco"	60 minutes	5 September 2023
138	2	"Bone of Contention"	60 minutes	12 September 2023
139	3	"Don't Take It Personal"	60 minutes	19 September 2023
140	4	"A Surprise Gift"	60 minutes	26 September 2023
141	5	"I Don't Give Warnings"	60 minutes	3 October 2023
142	6	"This Party Is Not Over!"	60 minutes	10 October 2023
143	7	"And Surprises Aren't Over"	60 minutes	17 October 2023
144	8	"Chapulineo"	60 minutes	24 October 2023
145	9	"Episode 9"	60 minutes	31 October 2023
146	10	"A difficult decision"	60 minutes	7 November 2023
147	11	"A lesbian in trouble"	60 minutes	14 November 2023
148	12	"the girl in trouble"	60 minutes	21 November 2023
149	13	"The holidays are over"	60 minutes	28 November 2023

== Specials and spin-offs ==
Currently airing installments.
Installment with an upcoming season.
Installment with an unknown status.
Installment is currently under development.
Installment no longer in development.

Title	Serie	Series premiere	Series finale	No. of seasons	Ref.
Acapulco Shore: Pleasure Without Guilt	Special	February 14, 2017	March 8, 2017	1	
Acapulco Shore: New Generation	Spin-off	March 14, 2017	April 4, 2017	1	
Acaplay	Special	January 9, 2018	April 13, 2021	4	
MTV Estudio Shore	Special	April 30, 2019	April 12, 2022	4	
Mawy	Spin-off	April 28, 2020	December 15, 2020	2	
Acapulco Shore: Their History	Special	Octubre 28, 2020	December 3, 2020	1	
Acapulco Shock	Spin-off	April 29, 2021	November 30, 2023	4	
Papi Shore	Spin-off	May 19, 2021	—	2	
