= List of The Amazing Race (American TV series) episodes (seasons 1–20) =

The Amazing Race is an American adventure reality game show in which teams of two race around the world (except the Family Edition which featured teams of four and was raced entirely in North America). The show premiered on CBS on September 5, 2001 and is hosted by Phil Keoghan, and aired semi-annually between fall and late winter/early spring from 2001 until 2016, then annually from 2017 to 2022, before headed back to semi-annually in the TV schedule since the 2023–24 television season.

As of December 10, 2025, 442 episodes of The Amazing Race have aired, currently in its thirty-eighth season. In January 2026, the series was renewed for a thirty-ninth season for the 2026–27 TV season.

Since the second season, episode titles are taken from quotes made by the racers in each episode. Quotes were sometimes altered slightly for humorous effect.

== Series overview ==
Season	Episodes	Originally released		Winners	Teams	Legs
Season	Episodes	First released	Last released	Winners	Teams	Legs
1	13	September 5, 2001	December 13, 2001	Rob Frisbee & Brennan Swain	11	13
2	11	March 11, 2002	May 15, 2002	Chris Luca & Alex Boylan	11	13
3	11	October 2, 2002	December 18, 2002	Flo Pesenti & Zach Behr	12	13
4	13	May 29, 2003	August 21, 2003	Reichen Lehmkuhl & Chip Arndt	12	13
5	12	July 6, 2004	September 21, 2004	Chip & Kim McAllister	11	13
6	13	November 16, 2004	February 8, 2005	Freddy Holliday & Kendra Bentley	11	12
7	12	March 1, 2005	May 10, 2005	Uchenna & Joyce Agu	11	12
8	12	September 27, 2005	December 13, 2005	Nick, Alex, Megan, & Tommy Linz	10	11
9	12	February 28, 2006	May 17, 2006	B. J. Averell & Tyler MacNiven	11	12
10	13	September 17, 2006	December 10, 2006	Tyler Denk & James Branaman	12	12
11	12	February 18, 2007	May 6, 2007	Eric Sanchez & Danielle Turner	11	13
12	11	November 4, 2007	January 20, 2008	TK Erwin & Rachel Rosales	11	11
13	11	September 28, 2008	December 7, 2008	Nick & Starr Spangler	11	11
14	12	February 15, 2009	May 10, 2009	Tammy & Victor Jih	11	11
15	11	September 27, 2009	December 6, 2009	Meghan Rickey & Cheyne Whitney	12	12
16	12	February 14, 2010	May 9, 2010	Dan & Jordan Pious	11	12
17	12	September 26, 2010	December 12, 2010	Nat Strand & Kat Chang	11	12
18	11	February 20, 2011	May 8, 2011	Kisha & Jen Hoffman	11	12
19	12	September 25, 2011	December 11, 2011	Ernie Halvorsen & Cindy Chiang	11	12
20	11	February 19, 2012	May 6, 2012	Rachel & Dave Brown, Jr.	11	12
21	11	September 30, 2012	December 9, 2012	Josh Kilmer-Purcell & Brent Ridge	11	12
22	11	February 17, 2013	May 5, 2013	Bates & Anthony Battaglia	11	12
23	11	September 29, 2013	December 8, 2013	Jason Case & Amy Diaz	11	12
24	12	February 23, 2014	May 18, 2014	Dave & Connor O'Leary	11	12
25	12	September 26, 2014	December 19, 2014	Amy DeJong & Maya Warren	11	12
26	12	February 25, 2015	May 15, 2015	Laura Pierson & Tyler Adams	11	12
27	12	September 25, 2015	December 18, 2015	Kelsey Gerckens & Joey Buttitta	11	12
28	12	February 12, 2016	May 13, 2016	Dana Borriello & Matt Steffanina	11	12
29	12	March 30, 2017	June 1, 2017	Brooke Camhi & Scott Flanary	11	12
30	12	January 3, 2018	February 21, 2018	Cody Nickson & Jessica Graf	11	12
31	11	April 17, 2019	June 26, 2019	Colin Guinn & Christie Woods	11	12
32	12	October 14, 2020	December 16, 2020	Will Jardell & James Wallington	11	11
33	11	January 5, 2022	March 2, 2022	Kim & Penn Holderness	11	11
34	12	September 21, 2022	December 7, 2022	Derek Xiao & Claire Rehfuss	12	10
35	12	September 27, 2023	December 13, 2023	Greg & John Franklin	13	12
36	10	March 13, 2024	May 15, 2024	Ricky Rotandi & Cesar Aldrete	13	11
37	12	March 5, 2025	May 15, 2025	Carson McCalley & Jack Dodge	14	12
38	12	September 25, 2025	December 10, 2025	Jas & Jag Bains	13	12
39	TBA	September 30, 2026	TBA	TBA	13	12

== Episodes ==
=== Season 1 (2001) ===
No. overall	No. in season	Title	Original release date	U.S. viewers (millions)	Rating/share (18–49)
1	1	"The Race Begins"	September 5, 2001	11.83	5.0/13
2	2	"Divide and Conquer"	September 19, 2001 (Note: The episode was originally scheduled to air on September 12, 2001, but CBS postponed its airing to focus on news coverage regarding the aftermath of the September 11 attacks.)	10.02	4.6/12
3	3	"Home for Some"	September 26, 2001	8.62	3.6/9
4	4	"Colossal Showdown"	October 3, 2001	8.70	3.9/10
5	5	"Desert Storm"	October 10, 2001	8.28	3.7/9
6	6	"Whatever It Takes to Win"	October 17, 2001	8.37	3.6/9
7	7	"Triumph and Loss"	October 24, 2001	9.17	4.0/10
8	8	"Competition to the Fullest"	October 31, 2001	8.40	3.6/9
9	9	"The Unexpected Twist"	November 14, 2001	9.44	3.8/9
10	10	"To the Physical and Mental Limit"	November 21, 2001	8.24	3.1/9
11	11	"Fight to the Last Minute"	November 28, 2001	9.48	4.1/10
12	12	"Race to the Finish – Part 1"	December 5, 2001	9.39	3.7/9
13	13	"Race to the Finish – Part 2"	December 13, 2001	13.65	6.0/15

=== Season 2 (2002) ===
No. overall	No. in season	Title	Original release date	U.S. viewers (millions)	Rating/share (18–49)
14	1	"The World Is Waiting: Go!"	March 11, 2002	8.95	3.9/10
15	2	"Help Me, I'm American!"	March 13, 2002	12.50	5.8/14
16	3	"My Alarm Clock Didn't Go Off!"	March 20, 2002	13.29	6.1/15
17	4	"The Game Is About Minutes"	March 27, 2002	9.73	4.1/10
18	5	"Welcome to the World of Being Human"	April 3, 2002	10.09	4.4/11
19	6	"I'm Gonna Take His Girl"	April 10, 2002	8.97	3.9/10
20	7	"I'm Gonna Throw Up on Phil's Shoes"	April 17, 2002	8.85	3.8/10
21	8	"I'm Not a Miner! No, You're an Idiot!"	April 24, 2002	9.56	4.5/12
22	9	"Ready to Lose Our Lives"	May 1, 2002	8.80	3.8/10
23	10	"It's Hammer Time"	May 8, 2002	9.95	4.2/10
24	11	"Follow That Plane!"	May 15, 2002	11.25	5.2/14

=== Season 3 (2002) ===
No. overall	No. in season	Title	Original release date	U.S. viewers (millions)	Rating/share (18–49)
25	1	"What If Our Parachute Doesn't Open?"	October 2, 2002	9.49	3.9/10
26	2	"This Seems Like the Path Straight to Hell"	October 9, 2002	8.04	3.6/9
27	3	"You Always Just Forget About Me!"	October 16, 2002	9.16	3.9/10
28	4	"Did You See How I Stopped It? In My Face"	October 23, 2002	8.05	3.3/8
29	5	"What Happens If I Slip? Am I Just Hanging Off a Cliff?"	October 30, 2002	7.73	3.1/8
30	6	"I'm a Much Better Liar Than You Are"	November 13, 2002	8.04	3.3/8
31	7	"I'm Supposed to Be Indebted to Her for the Rest of the Race?!"	November 20, 2002	7.80	2.9/8
32	8	"This Is More Important Than Your Pants Falling Down!"	November 27, 2002	9.94	4.2/12
33	9	"Why Did You Have to Take Your Pants Off?"	December 4, 2002	8.99	3.9/10
34	10	"Don't Try to Play the Moralist Now!"	December 11, 2002	9.39	4.0/10
35	11	"They're Slithering to the Finish Line Like the Rest of Us"	December 18, 2002	11.00	4.7/13

=== Season 4 (2003) ===
No. overall	No. in season	Title	Original release date	U.S. viewers (millions)	Rating/share (18–49)
36	1	"Cheaters Never Win... and They Cheated!"	May 29, 2003	9.94	3.7/12
37	2	"It Doesn't Say Anything About First Come First Served... and We're Bigger"	June 5, 2003	8.27	3.2/11
38	3	"I Wasn't Even Going to Touch You Until You Slammed My Head Backwards"	June 12, 2003	8.13	3.1/10
39	4	"Check Your Tires Because... Oh God, You Never Know What'll Happen!"	June 19, 2003	7.59	2.8/10
40	5	"You Are Just Deliberately Trying to Make Us Lose!"	June 26, 2003	7.86	2.9/10
41	6	"I Could Have Never Been Prepared for What I'm Looking at Right Now"	July 3, 2003	6.93	2.4/10
42	7	"We're Going Down the Wrong Side of The Freeway... and the Lights Are Off!"	July 10, 2003	8.05	3.0/11
43	8	"The Priestess Reminded Me of My Grandmother. She Was Very Old but Still Very, Very With It"	July 17, 2003	7.78	2.9/10
44	9	"We're Not at Charm School Learning How to Be a Gentleman, We're Racing"	July 24, 2003	8.60	3.3/12
45	10	"That's Me. That's My Face. Just Hit My Face. Hit My Face!"	July 31, 2003	8.13	2.9/10
46	11	"Such a Nice Pheromone Smell to You; Just Makes Me Want to Stay Close to You"	August 7, 2003	8.35	3.1/11
47	12	"He's a Couple of Ticks Away from Having a Heart Attack"	August 14, 2003	8.70	2.9/10
48	13	"It's Like Adam Building His First House"	August 21, 2003	9.88	3.7/12

=== Season 5 (2004) ===
No. overall	No. in season	Title	Original release date	U.S. viewers (millions)	Rating/share (18–49)
49	1	"Clearly, I'm More Intelligent than You"	July 6, 2004	10.30	4.3/12
50	2	"It Turned Ugly Just Now"	July 13, 2004	10.50	4.3/12
51	3	"I Got Electrocuted"	July 20, 2004	11.10	4.6/13
52	4	"Who Says Pageant Girls Don't Eat?"	July 27, 2004	10.05	4.3/12
53	5	"Are You Good at Puzzles?"	August 3, 2004	10.55	4.5/13
54	6	"Why Can't We Get a Camel?"	August 10, 2004	10.39	4.7/13
55	7	"Are You Sure This Is Safe?"	August 17, 2004	8.73	3.9/10
56	8	"I'm Going to Jail"	August 24, 2004	10.49	4.5/12
57	9	"If You're Going to Whine, Just Shut Up!"	August 31, 2004	9.98	4.3/11
58	10	"If They're Screwing the Helmet to My Head, It Can't Be Good!"	September 7, 2004	10.85	5.1/13
59	11	"It's Okay, Run Them Over!"	September 14, 2004	10.30	4.7/13
60	12	"You've Just Made Me a Millionaire"	September 21, 2004	12.85	5.6/14

=== Season 6 (2004–05) ===
No. overall	No. in season	Title	Original release date	U.S. viewers (millions)	Rating/share (18–49)
61	1	"The Game's Afoot"	November 16, 2004	11.79	5.0/12
62	2	"I'm Not His Wife, He Doesn't Need to Scream at Me"	November 23, 2004	11.46	4.7/12
63	3	"Counting Bears Is Not Rocket Science"	November 30, 2004	11.84	4.8/12
64	4	"What If It Isn't Sanitary"	December 7, 2004	11.72	4.6/12
65	5	"Quit Following Us"	December 14, 2004	10.73	4.1/10
66	6	"They Should Probably Have Some Counseling"	December 21, 2004	10.72	4.0/12
67	7	"Phil Is a Choo-Choo Charlie"	December 28, 2004	10.14	3.8/10
68	8	"One of You, I'm Gonna Break in Half"	January 4, 2005	10.66	4.4/10
69	9	"Tell My Mom I Love Her"	January 11, 2005	11.07	4.3/10
70	10	"Are There Instructions on Donkey Handling?"	January 18, 2005	10.61	4.1/9
71	11	"It Always Comes Down to Details"	January 25, 2005	12.03	4.7/11
72	12	"You Deal with This Before I Hyperventilate"	February 1, 2005	12.01	4.6/11
73	13	"4 Continents, 24 Cities and 40,000 Miles"	February 8, 2005	12.62	5.2/13

=== Season 7 (2005) ===
No. overall	No. in season	Title	Original release date	U.S. viewers (millions)	Rating/share (18–49)
74	1	"Courteous? This Is a Race!"	March 1, 2005	11.76	4.9/12
75	2	"The Whole Country Hates Me"	March 8, 2005	11.69	4.8/12
76	3	"Do You Need Some Mouth-to-Mouth Resuscitation?"	March 15, 2005	12.71	5.0/12
77	4	"What a Gaucho You Are"	March 22, 2005	12.43	4.6/11
78	5	"I've Been Wanting a Facelift for a Long Time (Note: This episode was double-length. When aired separately, the second half is titled "We're Moving Up the Food Chain")"	March 29, 2005	13.18	5.5/14
79	6	"Houston, We Have an Elephant!"	April 5, 2005	12.28	5.1/13
80	7	"They Saved the Eyeball"	April 6, 2005	5.16	3.6/6
81	8	"Mow'em Down Like Grass"	April 12, 2005	12.97	5.1/12
82	9	"We Have a Bad Elephant!"	April 19, 2005	12.34	5.1/13
83	10	"We've Got a Gnome! We've Got a Gnome!"	April 26, 2005	13.27	5.2/12
84	11	"The Devil Made Me Do It"	May 3, 2005	12.84	5.2/13
85	12	"Five Continents, 25 Cities and More Than 40,000 Miles"	May 10, 2005	16.01	6.8/17

=== Season 8: Family Edition (2005) ===
No. overall	No. in season	Title	Original release date	U.S. viewers (millions)	Rating/share (18–49)
86	1	"Go, Mommy, Go! We Can Beat Them!"	September 27, 2005	10.64	4.4/11
87	2	"How Do We Know We Aren't Going to Get Shot?"	October 4, 2005	11.25	4.3/10
88	3	"I Don't Kiss, I Make Out"	October 11, 2005	10.95	4.3/10
89	4	"Think Like an Office Chair"	October 18, 2005	11.11	4.5/11
90	5	"We're Getting Out of the Country, Girls"	October 25, 2005	10.38	4.1/10
91	6	"I'm Sick of Doing Stuff I Can't Do"	November 1, 2005	10.89	4.3/10
92	7	"You Look Ridiculous"	November 8, 2005	10.84	4.6/11
93	8	"How's That Face Feel?"	November 22, 2005	10.30	3.8/9
94	9	"Don't Talk to Me Like I Was an Animal or Something"	November 29, 2005	8.80	3.5/8
95	10	"The Family Christmas Card"	December 6, 2005	11.16	4.1/10
96	11	"25 Days, 50 Cities, and More Than 600 Consecutive Hours Together as a Family"	December 13, 2005	11.51	4.7/12

=== Season 9 (2006) ===
No. overall	No. in season	Title	Original release date	U.S. viewers (millions)	Rating/share (18–49)
97	1	"Here We Go, Baby, Off to Win a Million Bucks!"	February 28, 2006	10.40	4.1/10
98	2	"I'm Filthy, and I Love It"	March 7, 2006	9.46	3.8/10
99	3	"I'm in Russia Playing with Dolls"	March 14, 2006	9.67	4.0/10
100	4	"It's Not Over Until the Phil Sings"	March 21, 2006	9.40	3.9/10
101	5	"Good Thing I Took That Human Anatomy Class in High School"	March 28, 2006	9.20	3.8/10
102	6	"Sleep Deprivation Is Really Starting to Irritate Me"	April 5, 2006	8.15	3.1/9
103	7	"Herculean Effort for Some Herculean Dudes"	April 12, 2006	7.54	2.5/8
104	8	"Here Comes the Bedouin"	April 19, 2006	8.75	3.1/9
105	9	"Do You Know How Much Running I Did Today, Phil?"	April 26, 2006	8.55	3.0/9
106	10	"Man, They Should Have Used Fake Names"	May 3, 2006	7.70	2.9/8
107	11	"I Think This Monkey Likes Me"	May 10, 2006	8.41	3.0/9
108	12	"5 Continents, 9 Countries, More Than 59,000 Miles"	May 17, 2006	8.99	3.4/9

=== Season 10 (2006) ===
No. overall	No. in season	Title	Original release date	U.S. viewers (millions)	Rating/share (18–49)
109	1	"Real Fast! Quack, Quack!"	September 17, 2006	10.13	3.9/9
110	2	"Can Horses Smell Fear?"	September 24, 2006	10.57	3.5/9
111	3	"Oh Wow! It's Like One of Those Things You've Seen on TV!"	October 1, 2006	11.75	4.0/9
112	4	"I Know Phil, Little Ol' Gorgeous Thing"	October 8, 2006	10.15	3.5/9
113	5	"I Covered His Mouth, Oh My Gosh!"	October 15, 2006	11.65	4.0/9
114	6	"Maybe Steven Seagal Will See Me and Want Me to Be in One of His Movies"	October 22, 2006	10.89	3.8/9
115	7	"I Wonder if This Is Going to Make My Fingers Prickle"	October 29, 2006	11.66	3.9/9
116	8	"He Can't Swim But He Can Eat Cow Lips!"	November 5, 2006	11.38	3.7/8
117	9	"Being Polite Sucks Sometimes"	November 12, 2006	10.90	3.4/8
118	10	"Lookin' Like a Blue-Haired Lady on a Sunday Drive"	November 19, 2006	12.40	4.1/9
119	11	"We Just Won't Die, Like Roaches"	November 26, 2006	10.37	3.3/8
120	12	"Dude, I'm Such a Hot Giant Chick Right Now!"	December 3, 2006	10.60	3.5/8
121	13	"Say Your Deepest Prayers Ever!"	December 10, 2006	12.73	4.1/9

=== Season 11: All-Stars (2007) ===
No. overall	No. in season	Title	Original release date	U.S. viewers (millions)	Rating/share (18–49)
122	1	"I Told You Less Martinis and More Cardio"	February 18, 2007	10.29	3.1/8
123	2	"Beauty Is Sometimes Skin Deep"	February 25, 2007	8.17	2.9/7
124	3	"I'm Sorry I'm Wearing a Bathing Suit. It Is Very Weird, I Know"	March 4, 2007	10.77	3.7/9
125	4	"No Babies on the Race!"	March 11, 2007	9.82	3.3/9
126	5	"You Need to Watch Your Jokes, Guy"	March 18, 2007	12.00	3.9/10
127	6	"We're Going to Trade You for Food Now"	March 25, 2007	10.59	3.3/8
128	7	"If I Were in Town, I'd Ask for Your Number"	April 1, 2007	8.95	2.9/8
129	8	"If I Were in Town, I'd Ask for Your Number"	April 1, 2007	8.95	2.9/8
130	9	"The Way You Look, Yeah"	April 8, 2007	9.29	2.9/8
131	10	"We Are Trying to Make Love, Not War"	April 15, 2007	9.04	3.0/8
132	11	"Good Doing Business With You"	April 22, 2007	8.69	2.8/8
133	12	"Oh My God, the Teletubbies Go to War"	April 29, 2007	9.43	3.1/9
134	13	"Low to the Ground, That's My Technique"	May 6, 2007	10.31	3.3/9

=== Season 12 (2007–08) ===
No. overall	No. in season	Title	Original release date	U.S. viewers (millions)	Rating/share (18–49)
135	1	"Donkeys Have Souls, Too"	November 4, 2007	13.72	4.3/10
136	2	"I've Become the Archie Bunker of the Home"	November 11, 2007	10.48	3.2/8
137	3	"Please, Lord, Give Me Milk"	November 18, 2007	11.86	3.8/9
138	4	"Let's Name Our Chicken Phil"	November 25, 2007	11.80	3.6/8
139	5	"We Really Burned Bridges, For Sure"	December 2, 2007	11.26	3.5/8
140	6	"Cherry on Top of the Sundae That's Already Melted"	December 9, 2007	11.95	3.9/9
141	7	"This is Forever, Now"	December 23, 2007	8.97	2.8/8
142	8	"Honestly, They Have Witch Powers or Something"	December 30, 2007	9.69	2.9/7
143	9	"I Just Hope He Doesn't Croak on Us"	January 6, 2008	11.99	3.9/9
144	10	"Sorry, Guys, I'm Not Happy to See You"	January 13, 2008	11.65	3.8/9
145	11	"The Final Push"	January 20, 2008	9.75	3.1/7

=== Season 13 (2008) ===
No. overall	No. in season	Title	Original release date	U.S. viewers (millions)	Rating/share (18–49)
146	1	"Bees are Much Calmer Than All This"	September 28, 2008	10.04	3.2/8
147	2	"Do You Like American Candy?"	October 5, 2008	11.00	3.4/8
148	3	"Did You Push My Sports Bra Off the Ledge?"	October 12, 2008	9.01	2.9/7
149	4	"I Wonder if They Like Blondes in New Zealand"	October 19, 2008	10.29	3.1/7
150	5	"Do It Like a Madman"	October 26, 2008	9.70	3.0/8
151	6	"Please Hold While I Singe My Skull"	November 2, 2008	9.72	2.9/7
152	7	"My Nose is on Fire"	November 9, 2008	11.71	3.4/8
153	8	"I'm Like an Angry Cow"	November 16, 2008	12.13	3.5/8
154	9	"That is Studly"	November 23, 2008	9.87	2.7/5
155	10	"You're Gonna Get Me Killed"	November 30, 2008	11.83	3.5/8
156	11	"You Look Like Peter Pan"	December 7, 2008	10.50	3.1/8

=== Season 14 (2009) ===
No. overall	No. in season	Title	Original release date	U.S. viewers (millions)	Rating/share (18–49)
157	1	"Don't Let a Cheese Hit Me"	February 15, 2009	9.20	2.6/7
158	2	"Your Target is Your Partner's Face"	February 22, 2009	7.81	2.6/6
159	3	"I'm Not Wearing That Girl's Leotard"	March 1, 2009	10.60	3.0/8
160	4	"It Was Like a Caravan of Idiots"	March 8, 2009	10.13	3.1/8
161	5	"She's a Little Scared of Stick, But I Think She'll Be Ok!"	March 15, 2009	10.33	3.1/8
162	6	"Alright Guys, We're at War!"	March 22, 2009	12.42	3.6/9
163	7	"Gorilla? Gorilla?? Gorilla???"	March 29, 2009	11.99	3.7/9
164	8	"Rooting Around in People's Mouths Could Be Unpleasant"	April 12, 2009	10.57	3.1/8
165	9	"Our Parents Will Cry Themselves to Death"	April 19, 2009	10.31	3.0/8
166	10	"Having a Baby's Gotta Be Easier Than This"	April 26, 2009	10.27	3.2/9
167	11	"No More Mr. Nice Guy"	May 3, 2009	10.84	3.2/9
168	12	"This is How You Lose a Million Dollars"	May 10, 2009	10.49	3.1/9

=== Season 15 (2009) ===
No. overall	No. in season	Title	Original release date	U.S. viewers (millions)	Rating/share (18–49)
169	1	"They Thought Godzilla Was Walking Down the Street"	September 27, 2009	10.40	3.4/8
170	2	"It's Like Being Dropped on Planet Mars"	October 4, 2009	9.80	2.8/7
171	3	"Sean Penn Cambodia Here We Come"	October 11, 2009	10.52	3.2/8
172	4	"I'm Like Ricky Bobby"	October 18, 2009	10.92	3.3/8
173	5	"Do It for the Hood! Do It for the Suburbs!"	October 25, 2009	11.22	3.4/9
174	6	"This Is Not My Finest Hour"	November 1, 2009	11.22	3.3/8
175	7	"This Is the Worst Thing I've Ever Done in My Life"	November 8, 2009	11.62	3.5/8
176	8	"We're Not Meant for the Swamp"	November 15, 2009	11.39	3.4/8
177	9	"We're Not Working With Anybody, Ever, Anymore!"	November 22, 2009	12.19	3.7/9
178	10	"It Starts With an "F", That's All I'm Saying"	November 29, 2009	11.61	3.4/8
179	11	"Amazing Grace, How Sweet the Sound"	December 6, 2009	12.30	3.7/9

=== Season 16 (2010) ===
No. overall	No. in season	Title	Original release date	U.S. viewers (millions)	Rating/share (18–49)
180	1	"Nanna Is Kickin' Your Butt"	February 14, 2010	9.00	2.8/7
181	2	"When the Cow Kicked Me in the Head"	February 21, 2010	9.01	2.9/7
182	3	"Run Like Scalded Dogs!"	February 28, 2010	10.21	3.2/8
183	4	"We Are No Longer in the Bible Belt"	March 7, 2010	8.11	2.6/6
184	5	"I Think We're Fighting the Germans, Right?"	March 14, 2010	10.10	3.0/9
185	6	"Cathy Drone?"	March 21, 2010	11.99	3.8/9
186	7	"Anonymous?"	March 28, 2010	12.73	3.9/10
187	8	"You're Like Jason Bourne, Right?"	April 4, 2010	9.12	2.8/8
188	9	"Dumb Did Us In"	April 11, 2010	11.88	3.4/10
189	10	"I Feel Like I'm in, Like, Sicily"	April 25, 2010	10.65	3.2/9
190	11	"They Don't Even Understand Their Own Language"	May 2, 2010	10.29	3.0/9
191	12	"Huger Than Huge"	May 9, 2010	10.58	2.9/9

=== Season 17 (2010) ===
No. overall	No. in season	Title	Original release date	U.S. viewers (millions)	Rating/share (18–49)
192	1	"They Don't Call It the Amazing Race for Nothin!"	September 26, 2010	11.54	3.8/9
193	2	"A Kiss Saves the Day"	October 3, 2010	10.67	3.4/9
194	3	"In Phil We Trust"	October 10, 2010	11.99	3.8/9
195	4	"We Should Have Brought Gloves and Butt Pads"	October 17, 2010	10.94	3.5/9
196	5	"Tastes Like a Million Dollars"	October 24, 2010	11.42	3.4/8
197	6	"Run, Babushka, Run"	October 31, 2010	9.09	2.6/7
198	7	"I Want to Be in the Circus, That's Where I Belong"	November 7, 2010	11.01	3.3/8
199	8	"Ali Baba in a Suit"	November 14, 2010	10.34	2.8/7
200	9	"There's a Lot of Nuts and Bullets"	November 21, 2010	10.59	3.0/7
201	10	"I Hate Chinese Food"	November 28, 2010	11.07	3.2/7
202	11	"I'm Surrounded by Ninjas"	December 5, 2010	10.34	3.1/8
203	12	"Hi. I'm Sorry. I'm in a Race"	December 12, 2010	12.12	3.7/9

=== Season 18: Unfinished Business (2011) ===
No. overall	No. in season	Title	Original release date	U.S. viewers (millions)	Rating/share (18–49)
204	1	"Head Down and Hold On"	February 20, 2011	9.15	2.5/7
205	2	"I Never Looked So Foolish in My Whole Entire Life"	February 27, 2011	7.68	2.1/5
206	3	"We Had a Lot of Evil Spirits Apparently"	March 6, 2011	9.78	2.7/7
207	4	"This is the Most Stupid Day Ever"	March 13, 2011	9.44	2.7/8
208	5	"Don't Ruin the Basketball Game"	March 20, 2011	10.13	2.8/8
209	6	"I Feel Like a Monkey in a Circus Parade"	March 27, 2011	10.96	3.2/9
210	7	"You Don't Get Paid Unless You Win"	April 10, 2011	10.48	2.9/8
211	8	"I Cannot Deal with Your Psycho Behavior"	April 17, 2011	8.78	2.4/7
212	9	"We're Good American People"	April 24, 2011	9.37	2.6/8
213	10	"Too Many Cooks in the Kitchen"	May 1, 2011	9.20	2.6/7
214	11	"This Is Where it Ends"	May 8, 2011	8.97	2.6/7

=== Season 19 (2011) ===
No. overall	No. in season	Title	Original release date	U.S. viewers (millions)	Rating/share (18–49)
215	1	"Kindness of Strangers"	September 25, 2011	10.18	3.0/7
216	2	"The Sprint of Our Life"	October 2, 2011	10.87	3.2/7
217	3	"Don't Lay Down on Me Now!"	October 9, 2011	9.62	2.8/7
218	4	"This Is Gonna Be a Fine Mess"	October 16, 2011	9.21	2.7/6
219	5	"I Feel Like I'm in the Circus"	October 23, 2011	9.60	2.7/7
220	6	"We Love Your Country Already; It Is Very Spacious"	October 30, 2011	11.01	3.0/7
221	7	"Move Goat"	November 6, 2011	9.73	2.7/6
222	8	"Super Shady"	November 13, 2011	10.27	2.7/6
223	9	"It's Speedo Time"	November 20, 2011	10.24	2.8/7
224	10	"Release the Brake!"	November 27, 2011	10.15	2.9/6
225	11	"We Are Charlie Chaplin"	December 4, 2011	9.59	2.7/6
226	12	"Go Out and Get It Done"	December 11, 2011	11.72	3.3/7

=== Season 20 (2012) ===
No. overall	No. in season	Title	Original release date	U.S. viewers (millions)	Rating/share (18–49)
227	1	"Tears of a Clown"	February 19, 2012	10.34	2.8/7
228	2	"You Know I'm Not Smart as You"	February 26, 2012	7.71	2.2/5
229	3	"Bust Me Right in the Head With It"	March 4, 2012	10.30	2.8/7
230	4	"Taste Your Salami"	March 11, 2012	9.65	2.9/8
231	5	"Uglier Than a Mud Rail Fence"	March 18, 2012	9.54	2.7/7
232	6	"This Is Wicked Strange"	March 25, 2012	9.35	2.6/7
233	7	"I Didn't Make Her Cry"	April 8, 2012	9.18	2.5/7
234	8	"Let Them Drink Their Haterade"	April 15, 2012	9.12	2.6/7
235	9	"Bollywood Travolta"	April 22, 2012	9.14	2.6/7
236	10	"I Need Hair to be Pretty"	April 29, 2012	8.60	2.3/7
237	11	"It's a Great Place to Become Millionaires"	May 6, 2012	9.40	2.7/7
