= List of The Vanilla Ice Project episodes =

The Vanilla Ice Project is an American reality television series on the DIY Network. It is hosted by construction contractor and rapper Rob Van Winkle, a.k.a. Vanilla Ice, who has significant experience with home improvement and real estate flipping. Ice began purchasing houses in his early twenties and became more involved in home improvement projects starting around 1998.

During the course of the series, 105 episodes of The Vanilla Ice Project aired over nine seasons.

== Series overview ==
Season	Episodes	Originally released	
Season	Episodes	First released	Last released
1	11	October 14, 2010	January 1, 2011
2	13	January 21, 2012	April 7, 2012
3	13	January 27, 2013	April 28, 2013
4	13	March 8, 2014	May 10, 2014
5	13	April 4, 2015	June 20, 2015
6	13	April 23, 2016	July 9, 2016
7	13	July 15, 2017	September 30, 2017
8	10	August 11, 2018	October 6, 2018
9	6	July 27, 2019	August 31, 2019
Specials		January 21, 2012	September 7, 2019

== Episodes ==
=== Season 1 (2010–11) ===
No. overall	No. in season	Title	Original release date
1	1	"Nice, Nice...Landscaping"	October 14, 2010
2	2	"Party Pool"	October 14, 2010
3	3	"The Master Sweet"	October 21, 2010
4	4	"The Tasty New Kitchen"	October 28, 2010
5	5	"The Ugly Upstairs"	November 4, 2010
6	6	"Living Room Rescue"	November 11, 2010
7	7	"Rock Star Garage"	November 18, 2010
8	8	"High-Tech and Hidden"	December 2, 2010
9	9	"The Home Office"	December 9, 2010
10	10	"Rocking the Dining Room"	December 16, 2010
11	11	"Rapping It Up"	January 1, 2011

=== Season 2 (2012) ===
No. overall	No. in season	Title	Original release date	Prod. code
12	1	"The Art of Curb Appeal"	January 21, 2012	DICH-201H
13	2	"The Crazy Lazy River Pool"	January 21, 2012	DICH-202H
14	3	"Tiki Island Oasis"	January 28, 2012	DICH-203H
15	4	"The Killer Kitchen"	February 4, 2012	DICH-204H
16	5	"The Greatest Great Room"	February 11, 2012	DICH-205H
17	6	"Upstairs Reality Check"	February 18, 2012	DICH-206H
18	7	"The Master Hideaway"	February 25, 2012	DICH-207H
19	8	"The Ice House Retreat Suite"	March 3, 2012	DICH-208H
20	9	"Baby Got Back Yard"	March 10, 2012	DICH-209H
21	10	"The Ultimate Garage Getaway"	March 17, 2012	DICH-210H
22	11	"Elevator up to the Mega Den"	March 24, 2012	DICH-211H
23	12	"Boom-Boom Screening Room"	March 31, 2012	DICH-212H
24	13	"Punch List Olympics"	April 7, 2012	DICH-213H

=== Season 3 (2013) ===
No. overall	No. in season	Title	Original release date	Prod. code
25	1	"Raising the Roof"	January 27, 2013	DICH-301H
26	2	"Picking Up the Pool"	February 10, 2013	DICH-302H
27	3	"Living in Style"	February 17, 2013	DICH-303H
28	4	"Fun in the Sun"	February 24, 2013	DICH-304H
29	5	"A Masterful Bedroom"	March 3, 2013	DICH-305H
30	6	"Kitchen Conversion"	March 10, 2013	DICH-306H
31	7	"Customers to the Curb"	March 17, 2013	DICH-307H
32	8	"Master Bath Retreat"	March 24, 2013	DICH-308H
33	9	"Garage Busters"	March 31, 2013	DICH-309H
34	10	"A Tiki Island Paradise"	April 7, 2013	DICH-310H
35	11	"VIP Landscaping"	April 14, 2013	DICH-311H
36	12	"Sleeping in Style"	April 21, 2013	DICH-312H
37	13	"Open House to the Stars"	April 28, 2013	DICH-313H

=== Season 4 (2014) ===
No. overall	No. in season	Title	Original release date	Prod. code
38	1	"A Greater Room"	March 8, 2014	DICH-401H
39	2	"Kickstarting the Kitchen"	March 8, 2014	DICH-402H
40	3	"Master Bath Blowout"	March 15, 2014	DICH-403H
41	4	"Poolside Pump Up"	March 22, 2014	DICH-404H
42	5	"You Can't Take the House"	March 29, 2014	DICH-405H
43	6	"Master Breakdown"	April 5, 2014	DICH-406H
44	7	"Game On!"	April 12, 2014	DICH-407H
45	8	"Kings of the Curb"	April 19, 2014	DICH-408H
46	9	"The Upstairs Upheaval"	April 26, 2014	DICH-409H
47	10	"Shift Into Gear"	May 3, 2014	DICH-410H
48	11	"The Lakeside Lounge"	May 3, 2014	DICH-411H
49	12	"Green on the Scene"	May 10, 2014	DICH-412H
50	13	"Wide Open House"	May 10, 2014	DICH-413H

=== Season 5 (2015) ===
No. overall	No. in season	Title	Original release date	Prod. code
51	1	"A Killer Kitchen"	April 4, 2015	DICH-501H
52	2	"Mother Nature vs. Family Room"	April 4, 2015	DICH-502H
53	3	"Icing the Outdoor Kitchen"	April 11, 2015	DICH-503H
54	4	"Upstairs Upgrade"	April 18, 2015	DICH-504H
55	5	"Up and Away"	April 25, 2015	DICH-505H
56	6	"Outdoor Oasis"	May 2, 2015	DICH-506H
57	7	"Jellyfish Jitters"	May 9, 2015	DICH-507H
58	8	"Dining Room Deluxe"	May 16, 2015	DICH-508H
59	9	"Steam Clean"	May 23, 2015	DICH-509H
60	10	"Master of the House"	May 30, 2015	DICH-510H
61	11	"Jungle by the Ocean"	June 6, 2015	DICH-511H
62	12	"Turning Around the Garage"	June 13, 2015	DICH-512H
63	13	"Frenzied Finish"	June 20, 2015	DICH-513H

=== Season 6 (2016) ===
No. overall	No. in season	Title	Original release date	Prod. code	U.S. viewers (millions)
64	1	"Hunting for the Next VIP"	April 23, 2016	601	N/A
65	2	"Views from the Great Room"	April 23, 2016	602	N/A
66	3	"Suite Dreams"	April 30, 2016	603	N/A
67	4	"Infinity and Beyond"	May 7, 2016	604	N/A
68	5	"Kicking Up the Kitchen"	May 14, 2016	605	N/A
69	6	"Bubbles Causing Troubles"	May 21, 2016	606	N/A
70	7	"Temple of Renovation"	May 28, 2016	607	N/A
71	8	"Strike Zone"	June 4, 2016	608	N/A
72	9	"A VIP Main Attraction"	June 11, 2016	609	N/A
73	10	"Bringing Down the Roof"	June 18, 2016	611	N/A
74	11	"Taking the Heat to the Street"	June 25, 2016	612	N/A
75	12	"Docks and Crocs"	July 9, 2016	610	0.228
76	13	"A Rock Star Reveal"	July 9, 2016	613	0.281

=== Season 7 (2017) ===
No. overall	No. in season	Title	Original release date	Prod. code	U.S. viewers (millions)
77	1	"Commotion by the Ocean"	July 15, 2017	701	0.248
78	2	"Hip-Hop Hibachi"	July 15, 2017	702	0.224
79	3	"The Crown Jewel Pool"	July 22, 2017	703	0.338
80	4	"Fixin' the Kitchen"	July 29, 2017	704	0.207
81	5	"Making an Entrance"	August 5, 2017	705	0.194
82	6	"From Virtual to Reality"	August 12, 2017	706	0.291
83	7	"Wrath of the Bath"	August 19, 2017	707	0.262
84	8	"Master Suite Disaster"	August 26, 2017	708	0.243
85	9	"Great Expansions"	September 2, 2017	709	0.279
86	10	"Taking Charge of the Yard"	September 9, 2017	710	N/A
87	11	"Spacing Out"	September 16, 2017	711	0.263
88	12	"A Hot Rod Garage"	September 23, 2017	712	0.229
89	13	"Sealing the Deal"	September 30, 2017	713	0.246

=== Season 8 (2018) ===
No. overall	No. in season	Title	Original release date	Prod. code	U.S. viewers (millions)
90	1	"Treasure Hunting"	August 11, 2018	801	0.200
91	2	"Shell Shocked"	August 11, 2018	802	0.261
92	3	"Pool Problems"	August 18, 2018	803	0.260
93	4	"Icing on the Kitchen"	August 25, 2018	804	0.237
94	5	"The Backyard Bling Out"	September 1, 2018	805	0.204
95	6	"Working Out the Foyer"	September 8, 2018	806	N/A
96	7	"Extreme Interior"	September 15, 2018	807	0.214
97	8	"A Modern Master"	September 22, 2018	808	N/A
98	9	"Bringing Back the Bath"	September 29, 2018	809	0.193
99	10	"Racing to the Reveal"	October 6, 2018	810	N/A

=== Season 9 (2019) ===
In this season, Rob and the Ninjas stick to a $100,000 renovation budget.

No. overall	No. in season	Title	Original release date	Prod. code	U.S. viewers (millions)
100	1	"Kicking Hot Pink to the Curb"	July 27, 2019	901	N/A
101	2	"Adding Spice to the Kitchen and Living Room"	August 3, 2019	902	0.217
102	3	"A Five-Star Master Suite"	August 10, 2019	903	N/A
103	4	"Backyard TLC"	August 17, 2019	904	N/A
104	5	"Upstairs Battle"	August 24, 2019	905	N/A
105	6	"Garage Goals"	August 31, 2019	906	N/A

== Specials (2012–19) ==
Title	Original release date	Prod. code
"Ice My House"	January 21, 2012	DIMH-S12H
"Ice My House"	January 27, 2013	DIMH-1S13H
"Vanilla Ice: Big, Bad, and Bodacious!"	September 7, 2019	10R1R01
