= List of Wife Swap (American TV series) episodes =

This is a list of episodes for Wife Swap, an American reality show that aired between September 26, 2004 and April 16, 2020. Seasons 1 through 7 aired on ABC, while seasons 8 and 9 aired on Paramount Network.

== Season 1 ==
Episode(s)	Synopsis	Families		Air Date
1	A laid-back, animal-loving wife swaps with an obsessively tidy wife.	Pitts	Policchio	9/26/2004
2	A New York City multi-millionairess swaps with a school bus driver and wood chopper from rural New Jersey.	Spolansky	Bradley	9/29/2004
3	A traditional Southern wife whose family enjoys hunting swaps with an animal rights activist.	Smoak	Beaver	10/6/2004
4	A dairy farmer swaps with a Southern belle who is spoiled by her husband.	Donahoe	Baker	10/20/2004
5	A spiritual wife swaps with a traditional Italian wife.	Ghani	Stallone	10/27/2004
6	An overweight wife whose family eats junk food and does not exercise swaps with a fitness fanatic.	Smith	Weiner	11/3/2004
7	A wife who runs her household like a military boot camp swaps with a wife who enforces hardly any discipline.	Reimers	Bittner	11/10/2004
8	A submissive stay-at-home wife swaps with a career woman who leads her household.	Harris	Van Noy	11/17/2004
9	Husband swap. A biker who doesn't care about the environment or his neighbors swaps with a new age environmentalist who lives on a commune.	Paiss	Davis	12/1/2004
10	A conservative Christian housewife swaps with a wife whose family enjoys punk rock.	Ray	Aguirre	12/8/2004
11	A strict mother swaps with a mother who spoils her daughters rotten.	Elliot	Burkhalter	12/15/2004
12	A single mother struggling to raise three out-of-control daughters swaps with a wealthy Ivy League-educated wife.	Parsons	Bramhall	1/12/2005
13	A housewife who prioritizes family and clutter swaps with a career-driven wife whose family does not spend much time together.	Fontaine	Herman	1/19/2005
14	A lesbian swaps with a fundamentalist Christian wife who is opposed to gay rights.	Boone Luffey	Gillespie	2/9/2005
15	A funeral director's wife swaps with a wife who lives on the road in a bus with her family.	Pyke	Smith	2/16/2005
16	A White housewife married to a Black man swaps with a domineering Black wife married to a White man.	Bray	Flummerfelt	2/23/2005
17	A military veteran who supports President George W. Bush swaps with a pacifist who opposes Bush and the Iraq War.	Patrick	Leierwood	3/2/2005
18	Boss Swap. A strict owner of an all-male car dealership swaps with a boss who takes a nurturing approach with her all-female coworkers.	Silver	Caden	3/7/2005
19	A successful career woman swaps with a wife who dropped out of mainstream society to live in a treehouse.	Oeth	Cedarquist	3/16/2005
20	Vacation Swap. A wealthy family who holidays in Aspen trades vacations with a working class family who holidays in an RV park.	Hawn	Orlando	3/23/2005
N/A	A religious wife from rural Oklahoma swaps with one half of a gay male couple.	Bedford	Leonard	Unaired (Note: The Bedford/Leonard episode never aired in the United States, though it did air in 2005 on Channel 4 in the United Kingdom.)

== Season 2 ==
Episode(s)	Synopsis	Families		Air Date
1	An etiquette teacher swaps with a wife who lets her kids run wild in public.	Allison	Hagerty	9/12/2005
2	A White wife who gambles long into the night and whose husband uses racial slurs swaps with an overprotective Black wife.	Felix	Wiggins	9/20/2005
3	A wife obsessed with baseball swaps with a punk rock-loving hairdresser.	Collins	Matlock	9/26/2005
4	An untidy, animal-loving wife swaps with a strict, neat mother of five children.	Mayfield	Wasdin	10/03/2005
5	A wife who puts her young daughter in beauty pageants swaps with an artist who shuns makeup and technology.	Yonts	Jan-Turan	10/10/2005
6	An overprotective mother of nine who lives in an RV swaps with a career-driven realtor who barely sees her kids.	Downs	Bailey	10/17/2005
7	A Manhattan wife who loves to party swaps with a conservative Kentucky wife who raises llamas.	Nazario	Lassell	10/24/2005
8	A housewife with a large modern home and party-loving husband swaps with an eco-conscious wife who hates materialism.	Heiss	Kestrel	11/07/2005
9	A wife whose husband hunts animals for food swaps with a raw food vegan who claims to get nutrients from the Sun.	Hodge	Kolpin	11/14/2005
10	A fitness-obsessed wife with an ex-drill sergeant husband swaps with an overweight wife whose husband waits on her.	Johnson	Blackburn	11/21/2005
11	A pastor's wife swaps with an atheist wife whose husband runs an atheist radio show.	Stonerock	Finley	11/28/2005
12	A police officer swaps with a housewife who lives to serve her husband.	Fuentes	Lawson	12/12/2005
13	A high-maintenance, high-spending wife swaps with a do-good wife who encourages civic responsibility in her children.	Ast	Green	12/19/2005
14	A construction worker whose house is messy and disorganized swaps with a wife who runs her family with an iron fist.	Roy	Maness	1/9/2006
15	A wife who believes in raising children without rules swaps with a strict wife whose family practices martial arts.	Bimonte	Hubbard	1/16/2006
16	A wife who prioritizes saving money at every opportunity swaps with a children's entertainer with a failing business.	King	Reeves	1/30/2006
17	A shopaholic who hosts parties and spoils her kids swaps with a frugal and devoutly religious mother of eight.	Kraut	Hardin	2/6/2006
18	"Wife Swap Saved My Marriage". Several couples from Season 1 are interviewed to see how the show affected them one year later.	Couples from Season 1		2/20/2006
19	A wife who runs a modeling agency and seeks stardom for her two daughters swaps with a bear hunting, ice fishing wife from Wisconsin.	Schachtner	Martincak	2/27/2006
20	A Wiccan priestess whose husband worships her swaps with a wife who waits on her husband hand and foot.	Thompson	Askam	3/6/2006
21	A wife whose family lives as if they were in the Middle Ages swaps with a no-nonsense public school teacher.	Stamper	Haggerty	3/13/2006
22	A freak show performer swaps with a former beauty queen who runs a tanning salon.	Kinison	Czerniawski	3/27/2006
23	A laid-back wife who wants her kids to be her friends swaps with a controlling religious wife.	West	Grimes	4/10/2006
24	A wife from a modern cowboy family swaps with a wife who spoils her children, and whose husband spoils her.	Ridgley	Corrao	5/1/2006
N/A	A wife of a Greek-American restaurateur swaps with a wife from California.	Panagiotakis	Unknown	Unaired (Note: The episode, taped in early 2005, was halted mid-production after the Panagiotakis family's father was charged with hitting his 13-year-old daughter.)

== Season 3 ==
Episode(s)	Synopsis	Families		Air Date
1	An appearance-driven former beauty queen swaps with a blue-collar wife whose home is cluttered with junk shop items.	Jeffery	Greiner	9/18/2006
2	A wife from a family of modern-day pirates swaps with a wife who is obsessed with organizing.	Baur	Fine	9/18/2006
3	A wife who pushes her children to do sports swaps with a wife whose husband and son are addicted to video games.	Boyd	Milorey	9/20/2006
4	An wife who is fascinated by death swaps with a cosmetics executive with a short-tempered husband.	Zemanek	Brandon	9/25/2006
5	A strict wife obsessed with ballroom dancing swaps with a prison warden who commands no discipline at home.	Slater	Williams	10/2/2006
6	A former champion boxer swaps with a wife whose husband is a competitive eater (Eric Booker).	Alcorn	Booker	10/9/2006
7	A wealthy California wife who enjoys clothes shopping swaps with a wife who lives on a farm in Texas.	Lovazzano	Clover	10/16/2006
8	A cowgirl wife who supports her husband's traveling road show swaps with a wife who makes her husband do everything for her.	Mink	Oaks	11/13/2006
9	A wife who gives her teenage daughters free rein swaps with a wife who spies on her daughters and does not allow them to have friends over.	Rowland	Rivera	11/27/2006
10	A wife who does everything for her husband and three out-of-control sons swaps with a wife who runs a military-style home.	Talbott	Broider	12/4/2006
11	A Christian wife who believes chores are only for women swaps with a heavily tattooed atheist wife with a shaved head.	Lawrence	Caddel	12/4/2006
12	A professional bodybuilder swaps with a wife from a family of little people.	Johnson	Allemon	1/15/2007
13	An aspiring model swaps with a farm-dwelling grandmother who stresses traditional family values.	Koopman	Early	1/22/2007
14	A wife obsessed with her son's motocross career swaps with a self-proclaimed "green witch" who worships Mother Earth.	Starling	Sweany-Ernst	2/5/2007
15	A rock musician wife swaps with a ultra-conservative Christian housewife.	Meeks	Hoover	2/12/2007
16	A farmer who enforces a raw food diet on her children that includes raw meat swaps with an educated, urban, appearance-driven wife.	Haigwood	Hess-Webb	2/19/2007
17	A wife whose family business sells deer urine swaps with a salon owner who pampers her daughter.	Lowe	Hamilton	2/26/2007
18	A wife who owns a scrapyard swaps with a high-maintenance wife.	Browne	Robinson	4/27/2007
19	A psychic wife who is pampered by her husband swaps with a wife with out-of-control kids and a husband addicted to gambling.	Silver	Pitney	5/28/2007
20	A wife who is obsessed with her dogs and doesn't like people swaps with an environmentalist wife who lives in an eco-village.	Rush	Rios-Bolman	8/6/2007

== Season 4 ==
Episode(s)	Synopsis	Families		Air Date
1	A devout feminist swaps with the mother of a spoiled teenage beauty queen.	Boss	Gustaferro	1/2/2008
2	A laid-back wife with an immature husband swaps with a strict wife.	Flynn	Orris	1/9/2008
3	A wife from a family of clowns swaps with a wife whose kids have a strict chore regime and a limited social life.	Harrison-Velasco	Marshall	1/16/2008
4	A laid-back magician's wife swaps with a strict wife obsessed with cleanliness.	Martin-Portala	Galvan	1/23/2008
5	A burlesque performer swaps with a female lumberjack.	McDonald	Robarge	1/30/2008
6	A wife whose husband is a competitive truck puller swaps with a high-powered business executive.	Zaring	LaBrie	2/6/2008
7	A liberal Christian whose husband is a professor of theology swaps with a fundamentalist Christian who expects her daughters to be homemakers.	Beckman-Heskett	Childs	2/13/2008
8	An ex-military wife who works three jobs swaps with a rock-and-roll trophy wife.	Phillips	Blankenship	2/20/2008
9	An intellectual wife from a family of ghost hunters swaps with the wife of a Kentucky coal miner.	Myers	Sutton	2/27/2008
10	An older co-owner of a pet crematorium swaps with a younger shock jock radio host with an oddball husband.	McGoldrick	Noel	3/5/2008
11	A wife who makes her children work in the family bed and breakfast swaps with a wife who sacrifices for her children's dreams and has an out of control son.	Graf	Medici	3/12/2008
12	A wife obsessed with her son's wrestling career swaps with an artistic coffee-shop owner who does not believe in competitive sports.	Ketchum	Sheron	3/19/2008
13	A wife who runs a traveling carnival swaps with a wife who drives her daughters to be high-achievers.	Gillette	Turner	3/26/2008
14	A karaoke-loving wife swaps with an amateur kickboxer.	Figaratto	Martinez	4/2/2008
15	A deeply religious wife who shelters her children swaps with a party-loving wife who lets her children's boyfriend and girlfriend live in the house.	Stockdale	Tonkovic	4/23/2008
16	A messy wife who loves drag racing swaps with a fastidiously neat wife who lives to impress her family and social circle.	Sundstorm	Tower	4/30/2008
17	A wife who controls every minute of her children's schedule swaps with the wife of a bounty hunter who lets her children do whatever they want.	Tassie	Tyson	5/7/2008
18	An environmentally conscious artist swaps with the doting mother of a traveling motorcycle stunt-performing family.	Coste	Ives	5/14/2008
19	A control freak wife swaps with a wife who enjoys skateboarding and encourages self-expression.	Pay	Espinosa-Marquez	5/28/2008
20	A pig farmer swaps with a New York City belly dancer.	Carmichael	Hanna	6/25/2008

== Season 5 ==
Episode(s)	Synopsis	Families		Air Date
1	A wife whose mad scientist husband (Richard Heene) takes their children storm chasing swaps with a wife who is obsessed with child safety.	Heene	Martell	10/3/2008
2	A wife from a close-knit family of powerlifters swaps with a wife who organizes tea parties for little girls.	McCaslin	Deekens	10/10/2008
3	A wife from a lobster fishing family swaps with a shopaholic wife with undisciplined kids.	Kinsman	Thompson	10/17/2008
4	A wife from a family of ballet dancers swaps with a wife from the Louisiana bayou.	Melton	Dufrene	10/24/2008
5	A highly structured wife swaps with a Rastafarian wife.	Martin	Vallone	10/31/2008
6	A laid back wife swaps with an overbearing behavioral therapist who checks her children's desks at school.	Brown	Neighbors	11/7/2008
7	A wife who supports her aging husband's dreams of rock stardom swaps with a down-to-earth mother of nine children.	Berwick	Roachford	11/21/2008
8	A wife from the Florida Keys who loves to party swaps with a conservative wife whose husband is obsessed with sweepstakes.	Cooper	Kukta	12/12/2008
9	A wife who puts her baby daughter in beauty pageants swaps with a doctor who enjoys roller derby and doesn't care about appearances.	Dusseau	Smith-Snider	1/9/2009
10	A wife who is obsessed with coupons swaps with a wife whose family's excessive spending put them in debt.	McIntyre	Keyser	1/16/2009
11	A paintball-loving wife from rural Missouri swaps with a health-conscious San Francisco wife with a patronizing British husband.	Long	Stephens-Fowler	1/30/2009
12	A school teacher who emphasizes public education swaps with a wife who homeschools her children.	Jones	Martinson	2/6/2009
13	A career-driven realtor swaps with a wife who enjoys live action role playing.	Bonnett	Linkins	2/13/2009
14	A wife who practices laughter yoga and spoils her son swaps with a wife whose kids are unhappy due to life on a remote farm.	Petersen	Vaughn	2/27/2009
15	A strict wife who runs a martial arts school swaps with a wife who runs a community theater with her actor husband.	Chi	Edwards	3/6/2009
16	100th Episode. The storm-chasing Heene and psychic Silver families return to swap with each other after winning an audience poll.	Heene	Silver	3/13/2009
17	A wife from a family of jokesters swaps with a realtor whose children have a long chore list and no social life.	Henstein	Toulou	3/20/2009
18	A wife who runs a fitness boot camp with her husband swaps with an overweight, junk-food loving wife whose family enjoys demolition derby.	Brown	Holland	3/27/2009
19	A biker wife swaps with a strict wife obsessed with her family's Irish heritage.	Mallick	Stewart	4/3/2009
20	A materialistic wife obsessed with outward appearances and plastic surgery swaps with a wife whose family lives off-the-grid without electricity.	Burroughs	Padovan-Hickman	4/17/2009
21	An environmentally conscious vegan wife whose life is guided by astrology swaps with the wife of a cowboy from Texas.	Brazenwood	Taylor	4/24/2009
22	A wife whose family runs a haunted house swaps with a strict, old-fashioned wife who expects her children to be swimming champions.	Schults	Smith	5/1/2009

== Season 6 ==
Episode(s)	Synopsis	Families		Air Date
1	A wife who makes her children work in the family coffee shop and hot dog stand swaps with a wife who collects Reborn dolls and spoils her kids.	Cameron	Drago	4/2/2010
2	A wife whose family pop band seeks to achieve worldwide stardom swaps with a wife who is a social activist.	Fulco	Samel-Garloff	4/23/2010
3	A goth wife swaps with a wife who is obsessed with her sons playing ice hockey.	Schroeder	Wardle	4/30/2010
4	A wife who can't stand animals and orders her daughter around swaps with a laid-back wife whose house contains 29 pets.	Adams	Hess	4/30/2010
5	An inventor who believes in the power of manifesting one's goals swaps with an unemployed, overweight wife who lives in a trailer park.	Beauvais	Clayton	5/7/2010
6	An artistic wife who practices equality of gender roles with her husband swaps with a trophy wife whose husband is a male chauvinist.	Haller-Wren	Spencer	5/14/2010
7	A wife whose family puts on a traveling, clean-cut variety show swaps with a wife whose family enjoys low riding and believes in "keeping it real".	Herrington	Trevino	5/21/2010
8	A wife whose family lives like modern-day pioneers swaps with a wife whose family is obsessed with technology.	Flannagan	Logan	6/25/2010
9	A wife whose family focuses on their children's futures swaps with a survivalist whose family is preparing for the end of the world in 2012.	Cathrea	Stewart	7/9/2010
10	A wife who is obsessed with etiquette swaps with a wife whose family enjoys mud sports.	McLeish	O’Dell	7/16/2010
11	A workaholic, shopaholic wife with a stay-at-home husband swaps with a wife who owns an organic goat farm.	Funderburgh	Warren	7/23/2010
12	A wife who focuses her energy on one of her children, an aspiring rapper, swaps with a wife who hunts for cryptids and often ignores her teenage son.	Parker	Robinson	7/30/2010
13	A highly strict, competitive wife swaps with a laid-back wife who plays kickball.	Harris	Weasel	8/6/2010
14	A wife who teaches relationship workshops dressed as a superhero swaps with a strict wife whose family moved to the country to escape bad influences.	Cyboran	Owen-Ladino	8/13/2010

== Season 7 ==
Episode(s)	Synopsis	Families		Air Date
1	A religious wife who lives on a farm with no electricity swaps with a Las Vegas wife who loves to go to nightclubs.	Kuncaitis	Zdazinsky	3/21/2013
2	A Tea Party movement activist (Gina Loudon) swaps with a woman in a polyamorous relationship.	Envy	Loudon	3/28/2013
3	A self-proclaimed modern redneck swaps with a former beauty queen.	Cochran	Curry	4/4/2013
4	A strict disciplinarian swaps with a wife who emphasizes freedom and unschools her children.	Avery-Lamb	Martin	4/11/2013
5	An Italian wife who loves to eat swaps with a wife obsessed with fitness.	DiBella	LaRosh	4/18/2013
6	A pagan wife who believes in equal household duties swaps with a wife who dotes on her husband and champion tap dancer son.	Fireheart	Terry	4/25/2013
7	A wife whose children have no structure or rules swaps with a Russian tiger mother.	Markiewicz	Zusin	5/2/2013

== Season 8 ==
Episode(s)	Synopsis	Families		Air Date
1	A health-obsessed, perfectionist wife swaps with a stay-at-home husband who emphasizes fun.	Benner	McMichael	3/25/2019
2	A fire chief who runs her house like a battalion swaps with a stay-at-home wife who caters to her domineering husband.	Lobdell	Moon	4/11/2019
3	A high-tech wife who streams her family's life on the Internet swaps with a technophobic wife who lives off the grid.	DeGarmo	Mosby	4/18/2019
4	A gay millennial dad swaps with an old-fashioned wife with eight children.	Goss	Joseph	4/25/2019
5	A wealthy, workaholic wife swaps with a wife whose family lives in a converted school bus with a compost toilet.	McCormick	Muffley	5/2/2019
6	A sport-obsessed, competitive wife swaps with a laid-back yogi.	Drudge	Fusco	5/9/2019
7	A germaphobe who runs her house like a corporation swaps with a messy, free-spirited wife.	Levine	Williams	5/16/2019
8	A vegetarian Hindu with undisciplined children swaps with a rancher wife whose four-year-old works with the family's livestock.	Chauhan	Lenoir-Johnson	5/23/2019
9	A conservative stay-at-home wife swaps with a career-minded lesbian who believes in female empowerment.	Dias	Lunsford	5/30/2019
10	An authoritative, controlling wife swaps with a farmer who gives her children freedom to express themselves.	Icgoren	Legend	6/6/2019

== Season 9 ==
Episode(s)	Synopsis	Families		Air Date
1	A strict Nigerian wife swaps with a wife who gets little help from her husband in raising her spoiled children.	Akinbode	Mullis	2/13/2020
2	A school teacher swaps with a wife who believes in conspiracy theories and teaches her children that the Earth is flat.	Frayall	Dutcher	2/20/2020
3	A take-charge social media influencer swaps with the subservient wife of a biker.	Villalpando	Price	2/27/2020
4	A pagan witch swaps with the wife of a pastor who specializes in casting out demons and evil spirits.	Floyd-Ely	Clanton	3/5/2020
5	A liberal school teacher active in the Latino community swaps with a conservative wife whose husband is a Donald Trump supporter.	Fussell	Rodriguez	3/12/2020
6	An animal conservationist and snake wrangler swaps with a mother of six whose family enjoys sport hunting.	Parker	Mross	3/19/2020
7	A stay-at-home wife who runs a picture-perfect house swaps with a wife from a laid-back, hard-partying family.	DiCesare	Brown	3/26/2020
8	A circus wife with an overworked sword swallower husband swaps with an overwhelmed mother of four boys whose husband is obsessed with antiques.	Steele	Shepherd	4/2/2020
9	An active wife from a pro wrestling family swaps with a wife whose husband prefers video games over spending time with his family.	Sharrer	Peete	4/9/2020
10	A cosmopolitan, appearance-focused wife swaps with a wife from a down-to-earth farming family.	Jackson	Green	4/16/2020
