= List of Bigg Boss (Malayalam TV series) episodes =

List of episodes of Bigg Boss Malayalam

Bigg Boss launching poster

Bigg Boss is the Malayalam-language version of Indian reality television series Bigg Boss, produced by Endemol Shine India and broadcast on Asianet. The show was launched on 24 June 2018, which marked the beginning of the first season, which ended on 30 September 2018, lasting 99 episodes. It was renewed for a second season which premiered on 5 January 2020. Mohanlal is the host of the show.

The show follows selected number of contestants, known as housemates, who are isolated from the outside world for 100 days (or 15 weeks) in a custom built house. The housemates are continuously monitored during their stay in the house by live television cameras as well as personal audio microphones. They are dictated by an omnipresent entity named Bigg Boss. Each week, one or more of the housemates are evicted by a public vote.

== Series overview ==
Season	Episodes	Originally aired	
Season	Episodes	Season Premiere	Season Finale
1	99	24 June 2018	30 September 2018
2	76	5 January 2020	20 March 2020 Cancelled
3	97	14 February 2021	1 August 2021
4	99	27 March 2022	3 July 2022
5	99	26 March 2023	2 July 2023
6	99	10 March 2024	16 June 2024
7	99	3 August 2025	9 November 2025
8	TBA	6 September 2026	TBA

== Episodes ==
=== Season 1 (2018) ===
The first season premiered on 24 June 2018 and ended on 30 September 2018. The house was built at Mumbai where 18 housemates contested (two of them being wildcard entries). Mohanlal was the host of the season. Sabumon Abdusamad emerged as the winner after 98 days.

Ep. No.	Title	Original airing	Short summary
1	Mohanlal's roaring reality show	June 24, 2018	16 contestants, 100 days of unlimited drama, all in one 'Bigg' house. Catch Mollywood's complete actor, Mohanlal light the fuse to the biggest live reality show in Malayalam.
2	Aditi Rai gets maximum nominations for eviction	June 25, 2018	Less than a day's stay in the Bigg Boss house, Aditi faces personal comments and ends up shattered in tears. The eventful day simmers down with the first captain being selected.
3	Diya and Aditi get into an argument	June 26, 2018	The housemates face their first ever luxury budget task which requires them to dance as ordered.
4	Manoj collapses	June 27, 2018	The luxury budget task continues as the housemates are divided into two teams, Mohanlal and Mammootty. Manoj collapses after the task and is rushed to the hospital for treatment.
5	Manoj Verma makes his exit from Bigg Boss house	June 28, 2018	Catch the reaction of the housemates as tension builds between Sreenish and Archana. Witness an unexpected departure as a contestant is asked to leave the house.
6	Underwear is a Luxury!	June 29, 2018	Bigg Boss uses the luxury budget as a unique way of addressing Suresh's request for extra underwears. Catch the reaction of the housemates as they get their first luxury supplies.
7	Mixed Bag of Emotions	June 30, 2018	Mohanlal is back and this time he comes bearing gifts and happy news. Ranjini's captaincy is off to a rough start as the housemates turn against her. Catch the Superstar as he builds up the tension for the first round of eliminations.
8	May the Famous be saved	July 1, 2018	Mohanlal takes the eviction to the next level with a unique popularity poll task. Find out who will be voted as the least popular contestant, paving his or her way to an early exit from the house.
9	Playing a double game	July 2, 2018	Pearle and Sreelakshmi face severe criticism for their two-faced gameplay. With the next elimination around the corner, will these accusations lead them to being nominated?
10	Luxury Task Turns Rough	July 3, 2018	The luxury budget task, designed to test the business abilities of the housemates, brings out the violent side in some. Amidst all the tension, conspiracies and backstabbing, are new alliances being formed?
11	A Saboteur in the Mix!	July 4, 2018	The luxury task has the housemates questioning their friendships, new and old. Catch what happens when Bigg Boss decides to add a saboteur amidst all the conspiring and the drama.
12	Anything to Become the Captain!	July 5, 2018	The captaincy task has the three contenders trying to outlast one another at the end of a rope. Catch what happens when Srinish is dragged into some embarrassing situations during the captaincy task.
13	Sabu's Master Plan	July 6, 2018	The housemates are given another chance to win back their luxury budget. Catch Sabu do what he does best in a special task. Who will fall victim to his latest prank?
14	Ranjini's Captaincy, a Success?	July 7, 2018	Mohanlal is back with his unique and hilarious take on all of the week's drama. Catch the housemates as they discuss Ranjini's eventful captaincy.
15	A new player in the House	July 8, 2018	Swetha is in tears as she is faced with a question that will decide the fate of the nominated housemates. Join Mohanlal as he introduces the newest member of the Bigg Boss house.
16	Shiyas's Explosive Entry	July 9, 2018	Being the captain, Srinish is given a special advantage to turn the tables for some in the Bigg Boss house. The housemates are taken aback by Shiya's explosive entry to the house.
17	A Killer on the Run	July 10, 2018	A killer is on the run and murders the contestants one by one as part of this week's luxury budget task. Tune in to find out who will be the killer's first victim.
18	A full-blown Investigation	July 11, 2018	Suspicions grow stronger as Swetha and Sabu try to expose the killer by interrogating the housemates. Catch all the action as Ranjini is asked to murder an investigating officer.
19	The Court Is in Session	July 12, 2018	The housemates finally get a chance to raise their complaints. Catch all the action as major accusations are thrown at some of the contestants in the court.
20	Ranjini, Guilty as Charged!	July 13, 2018	The court has found Ranjini guilty, and the punishment? Taping her mouth. However, she wins an opportunity to battle it out with Basheer in the captaincy task.
21	Shweta faces the Heat	July 14, 2018	Mohanlal is back, seeking answers from Swetha for some of the statements made by her after the eviction. Catch all the fun and drama as the world cup fever hits the Bigg Boss house.
22	Sreelakshmi, a Tattletale?	July 15, 2018	Despite the World Cup fever, all eyes are on the house as the contestants await the audience's verdict. Catch Sreelakshmi's powerful response to being branded a tattletale.
23	Deepan's Birthday Bash!	July 16, 2018	The house is all set to celebrate Deepan's birthday as the housemates perform a variety of cultural programs. Catch all the fun and action as Pearle and Suresh perform a soulful folk song.
24	Ranjini Lashes Out at Pearle	July 17, 2018	The contestants' brain, brawn and speed are put to test in this week's luxury budget task. Things turn ugly as Ranjini lashes out at Pearle for accusing her of being a useless captain.
25	Sabu Apologises to Pearle	July 18, 2018	Sabu and Pearle sort out their differences before Ranjini calls up a house meeting to address the issues prevailing inside the house. Catch all the action and drama as the housemates perform a skit as a part of the luxury budget task.
26	Shiyas, Caught Off Guard	July 19, 2018	Shiyas faces the heat when the contestants confront him for being an irresponsible leader. Catch the drama as the housemates unite to voice their problems against him in the Bigg Boss court.
27	Is Bigg Boss Unfair!	July 20, 2018	Sabu's antics leads to an ugly situation after a contestant ends up getting slapped. Tune in to find out why the housemates resort to voicing slogans against Bigg Boss and its aftermath.
28	A Prayer for Kerala	July 21, 2018	Mohanlal and the housemates recite a heartfelt prayer for the flood victims and their families in Kerala. Catch the emotional verbal exchange between Anoop and Sreelakshmi that has them both in tears.
29	A Shocking Second Eviction	July 22, 2018	Pearle discusses her plan of action for the coming week as a captain with Mohanlal. Catch all the action and drama as a shocking second eviction devastates the housemates.
30	Love Is in the Air!	July 23, 2018	Pearle and Srinish become the hot topic of the house as the housemates suspect a budding romance between them. Tune in to witness this week's nomination and its ill-effects on Ranjini and Shweta.
31	Welcome to Bigg Boss School	July 24, 2018	The housemates get a chance to relive their school days in the Bigg Boss school as a part of the weekly task. Anoop's role, as a teacher, goes too far as Shwetalashes out at him for mistreatingher during the task..
32	Pearle vs The House?	July 25, 2018	The luxury budget task continues as the contestants are asked to compete in a speech contest. Catch all the drama as Pearle faces the heat with the housemates turning against her for the statements made by her.
33	Music, Dance, Food and Fun	July 26, 2018	Shiyas and Srinish lock horns in an arm-wrestling match that will decide the last contender for the captaincy. Join Sabu and the housemates as they turn the house into a fun-filled and bustling 'Thattukada'.
34	Suresh Against the House!	July 27, 2018	Suresh gets into trouble for making some derogatory statements about women. Later, Sabu, Diya and Anoop confront the captaincy task. Who will be the next captain?
35	Roaring Out with Anger!	July 28, 2018	Seeing the aggression building among the housemates, Mohanlal gives the irked contestants an opportunity to vent out their anger. Diya's outrageous statement about Archana leaves the housemates in shock.
36	The Contestants Face Eviction	July 29, 2018	The housemates are in for a shock as an unforeseen eviction knocks on their door. Later, certain unexpected turn of events leads to a wild card entry. Who's the new entrant?
37	Anjali's Shocking Revelation	July 30, 2018	Already surprised by the unexpected wild card entry, the housemates are again left startled when Anjali Ameer makes a shocking revelation.
38	The Best Nickname Award Goes to!	July 31, 2018	The housemates gather for an uproaring award night in the house. With Pearle hosting the event, guess the hilarious nicknames awards your favourite contestants will win.
39	A Surprise for Aditi	August 1, 2018	Aditi's birthday comes with a big surprise as Bigg Boss grants 2000 luxury points as her birthday gift. Catch all the fun as the contestants are asked to perform a lyrical narrative of a particular incident in the house.
40	Friends Turned Foes?	August 2, 2018	Things turn ugly when Sabu confronts Pearle for ill-treating Anjali. Catch the drama unfold as Pearle holds Sabu accountable for playing a dirty game.
41	The Masters and Their Slaves	August 3, 2018	After a shocking brawl between Basheer and Sabu, the contestants confront an exciting task. The nominated housemates end up becoming the masters and each select a slave from among the contestants.
42	A Gift For Shiyas!	August 4, 2018	In order to boost up Shiyas's energy, Mohanlal has a few interesting plans in mind. But, an unexpected phone call for Pearle brings a startling surprise.
43	Who will Leave the House this Time?	August 5, 2018	With Basheer, Diya and Srinish in the danger zone, tension builds up in the Bigg Boss house until Mohanlal declares the elimination result.
44	Anjali, Aditi in a Fix	August 6, 2018	Anjali and Aditi face an ugly situation when Bigg Boss indulges them in a voluntary nomination task. Which among the two, is ready to give up her Bigg Boss dream?
45	A Secret Spy!	August 7, 2018	The housemates are left in shock as they learn about an impostor among themselves. In order to figure out who the traitor is, Sabu comes up with a plan.
46	Anjali Quits the Show!	August 8, 2018	Tears breakout in the house as Anjali's health condition forces her to leave the show. Watch the contestants bid farewell to Anjali as she meets them one last time.
47	It's Pearle Vs Shiyas	August 9, 2018	A heated argument leads to a brawl between Shiyas and Pearle after Shiyas makes a rude remark against her. Suresh tries to make peace, but ends up augmenting the situation.
48	All Set for a New Captain?	August 10, 2018	The housemates are left surprised when the contenders for captaincy confront the unexpected. With all the mental and physical preparation done, find out who among Shiyas, Anoop and Aditi is the new captain.
49	Ulaganayagan Meets Mohanlal!	August 11, 2018	The housemates skip a beat as the legendary actor, Kamal Haasan walks into the house. The fun begins when the housemates welcome Kamal Haasan with an uncontrollable excitement and happiness.
50	An Unexpected Turn of Events	August 12, 2018	An unexpected call from Anjali to Mohanlal turns the elimination process upside down. That's not all, considering the public request, an ex-contestant steps into the house.
51	The Captain in Tears!	August 13, 2018	Shiyas, the captain of the house, finds himself in a fix when the entire house fumes upon him. Watch him stand against all the allegations.
52	Suresh, Pearle in a Tight Spot!s	August 14, 2018	Things take a dirty turn for Suresh and Pearle when the housemates blame Pearle for trapping Suresh in her love. Is it a planned move to create differences between the duo?
53	The True Culprits Exposed!	August 15, 2018	In order to solve the mystery case, Actor Mukesh enters the house as a special investigating officer and surprises the housemates. Watch how Mukesh's investigation unmasks the true culprits before the house.
54	Ski Your Way to Captaincy	August 16, 2018	The Independence Day celebrations continue as the housemates perform a patriotic song written by Suresh. Catch all the fun as Anoop, Archana and Adithi take part in a unique skiing challenge in the captaincy task.
55	Start, Camera, Action!	August 17, 2018	The Bigg Boss house turns into an acting stage as the housemates audition themselves for a role. The fun begins when Ranjini and Sabu, the Producer and the Director, take up the stage.
56	The housemates in shock!	August 18, 2018	Worried for the state going through a natural disaster, the housemates are relieved after they receive calls from their family members. But, the game must go on and the housemates face an exciting task.
57	The Judgement Day	August 19, 2018	Pearle and Suresh stand before the court of Bigg Boss as they are victimised for a few allegations by the housemates.
58	Shiyas in Pain!	August 20, 2018	Shiyas feels helpless as he learns that the state is suffering from the devastating floods. Meanwhile, a war of words break out in the house between Anoop and Ranjini.
59	Compete and Conquer!	August 21, 2018	The housemates divide into two groups and compete with each other to conquer different parts of the house. Watch to find out which team gains custody over which part of the house.
60	An Unpleasant Morning	August 22, 2018	Ranjini and Basheer's ego clash results in an unpleasant morning for the housemates. Stay tuned as an unexpected declaration from Pearle and Shrinish will leave you in surprise.
61	Turmoil in the House	August 23, 2018	The Bigg Boss house fills with an uproar as Pearle accuses Aditi of using Suresh for her gains. A livid Aditi lashes out at Pearle which splits the house into two groups.
62	Hima Threatens Basheer	August 24, 2018	Hima and Basheer end up in a heated argument as Basheer calls her affection towards Sabu as fake. Hima's reaction irks Basheer, who complains to Bigg Boss.
63	Mohanlal Enters the House	August 25, 2018	Mohanlal enters the Bigg Boss house on the occasion of Onam. The housemates are happy and excited to see the superstar join them for the special moment.
64	Love Is In the Air	August 26, 2018	Pearle and Srinish express their feelings for each other on being asked by Mohanlal about their special bond. A new task is assigned to the housemates dividing them into 2 teams of 5 each.
65	The House Sees Tempers Flare	August 27, 2018	Pearle accuses the new captain, Basheer of being partial which leads to a heated argument between the two. A strung up atmosphere sets in the house as the nominations for elimination begins.
66	Shiyas Is Shocked	August 28, 2018	The housemates ignore Shiyas, who stands clueless as to why everyone is cold towards him.
67	Shiyas Gets a Makeover!	August 29, 2018	For the first time in his lifetime, Shiyas dresses as a girl for a task leaving everyone stunned. Meanwhile, the good friends, Sabu and Anoop part ways.
68	Let's Tussle!	August 30, 2018	Bigg Boss assigns the Kabbadi-Kabbadi task to the three contenders of the captaincy post. Archana, Hima and Sreenish tussle with the housemates to win the captaincy.
69	Archana's Meltdown	August 31, 2018	Archana breaks down while working in the kitchen area as a concerned Pearle and Aditi rush in to comfort her.
70	Basheer Comes Clean	September 1, 2018	Mohanlal questions Basheer about his verbal spat with Pearle during his tenure as a captain. Tune in to hear Basheer's clarification about the whole incident.
71	A Shocking Elimination	September 2, 2018	Anoop, Shiyas and Pearle are the three nominees that are in the danger of elimination. The housemates are stunned and dazed after the shocking elimination.
72	Shiyas Breaks Down	September 3, 2018	Aditi, Pearle and Srinish rush in to comfort Shiyas as he has an emotional outburst.
73	Tell Me a Story!	September 4, 2018	The entire house turns into a laughter club, when the housemates start narrating stories on hilarious subjects provided by Bigg Boss. Don't miss these moments to laugh out loud, tune in, now.
74	The Bigg Disappointment	September 5, 2018	After failing to earn enough luxury points due to the merely impossible tasks, the housemates blame Bigg Boss for being tough on them. Kind-hearted, Bigg Boss decides to show mercy.
75	Let's Get Dirty!	September 6, 2018	Bigg Boss assigns a new task to the captaincy contenders Aditi, Shiyas, Suresh and Hima. The contenders are required to test their strength in mud and dirt to become the captain.
76	A Physical Altercation	September 7, 2018	Hima manhandles Sabu when the latter makes some personal comments about her. Sabu retaliates which leads to a physical altercation between the duo.
77	Mohanlal Issues a Warning	September 8, 2018	Mohanlal is angry on Hima and Sabu for their recent verbal and physical altercation. He sternly warns the duo not to break the house rules.
78	An Elimination Worth the Wait	September 9, 2018	Aditi, Shiyas, Archana and Hima are in the danger zone. The housemates are stunned with the elimination results but nothing in the Bigg Boss happens without a twist.
79	Aditi in a Tight Spot	September 10, 2018	Aditi is in for a surprise as she is asked to nominate two people directly for elimination by Bigg Boss.
80	All Hail King Shiyas!	September 11, 2018	Bigg Boss assigns a new luxury task to the housemates in which Shiyas is appointed as the king. The housemates are required to abide by the rules made by the king.
81	From King to a Prisoner	September 12, 2018	Shiyas who was appointed as the king in the luxury budget task is overthrown by the new king, Suresh. The new king unleashes his fury on Shiyas and puts him in the makeshift prison.
82	Hide and Seek	September 13, 2018	Divided into two groups, the housemates face the Hide and Seek challenge. But, the game turns hilarious when Sabu's unfair game earns him a punishment from Bigg Boss.
83	The Bigg Prank	September 14, 2018	Bigg Boss assigns a secret task to Sabu who is unaware that the other housemates are informed of the same. Watch the housemates join Bigg Boss to prank Shiyas.
84	Put on Your Dancing Shoes	September 15, 2018	Mohanlal asks a few housemates to dance for the audience after he views them doing the same in the previous episode. Tune in and enjoy the hilarious moments as the housemates shake a leg.
85	Aditi Clarifies Her Decision	September 16, 2018	A heated debate arises in the house as Aditi comes clean about her decision regarding the nomination.
86	A Surprise from Mohanlal	September 17, 2018	The housemates are stunned and excited about receiving a surprise from superstar Mohanlal. Classic Malayalam film, Manichitrathazhu starring the superstar himself is screened for the housemates.
87	Pearle-Shrinish Parting Ways?	September 18, 2018	An unexpected fight between, the only couple, Pearle and Shrinish leaves the Bigg Boss house shocked. The housemates gather to figure out the conflict between the duo.
88	Let the Task Begin!	September 19, 2018	The housemates fasten their belts with the introduction of the luxury budget task. As the game reaches its peak, Sabu gets his eye critically injured.
89	The Shiyas - Srinish Show	September 20, 2018	Bigg Boss assigns a new task to the housemates where Shiyas and Srinish turn talk show hosts. Tune in as the housemates get candid with the duo about their life and career.
90	Suresh, Sabu Lock Horns	September 21, 2018	Suresh and Sabu have an argument over the way Sabu was preparing a dish. Tempers flare between the duo when Suresh says that Sabu spoilt the dish.
91	Suresh's Eye Opening Moment	September 22, 2018	Suresh tells Mohanlal about the moment he changed his mind about quitting the show.
92	Shiyas Decides to Quit	September 23, 2018	The housemates are asked to play a game of cricket but with a twist. Tune in to find out why Shiyas is in tears and pleading to leave the house.
93	Cooking Up a Storm	September 24, 2018	Sabu and Pearle try to make something special for the housemates in the kitchen but their attempt turns into a disaster making the duo run for cover.
94	Setting the Stage on Fire	September 25, 2018	Bigg Boss assigns a dance task to the housemates where a stage is set in the house for them. Join the fun as the housemates set the stage on fire with their cool dance moves.
95	Freeze, Rewind and Release!	September 26, 2018	Bigg Boss hides a remote control inside the house which will give the housemates the control to freeze their fellow housemates. Surprised, the housemates engage themselves in finding the remote.
96	The Ultimate Elimination	September 27, 2018	It's merely a few days left for the finale and the housemates confront an unexpected elimination.
97	Imaginary Bigg Boss Challenge	September 28, 2018	The housemates are tasked to create an imaginary image of Bigg Boss. Tune in and check out how they unleash their imagination and try to race their contenders.
98	A Bigg Surprise	September 29, 2018	Bigg Boss gives a grand surprise to the housemates leaving them awestruck.
99	The Grand Finale Is Here	September 30, 2018	The finale promises flashy lights, rocking performances and loads of entertainment. There is excitement in the air as Mohanlal discloses the name of the winner.

=== Season 2 (2020) ===
The second season premiered on 5 January 2019. Mohanlal returned as the host. The house was built at Chennai, where 17 contestants entered on day-1.

Ep. No.	Title	Original airing	Short summary
1	The Grand Launch	January 5, 2020	The brand new season of Bigg Boss is here! Superstar Mohanlal welcomes seventeen new housemates, who are eager to begin their journey in the Bigg Boss ouse. Watch the legend get the ball rolling, however, with a twist in the tale.
2	First Captain	January 6, 2020	As the housemates try to know each other and acquaint themselves with their new abode, Bigg Boss throws open the first challenge. It's time to choose the captain and it won't be easy.
3	The Yearn for their Families	January 7, 2020	Amidst all the fun, laughter and merry singing sessions, the housemates get their first task, which leaves everyone teary-eyed.
4	Rajith's Tale and the First Argument in House	January 8, 2020	As the housemates take turns to share their life stories, Rajithkumar's tale leaves everyone shell-shocked.
5	Day 4 in the House	January 9, 2020	The wave of emotions continues to sweep over the house even today. While Somadas' story touches hearts, Shaji gets into limelight for his style of expression.
6	Arya's Heartbreaking Story	January 10, 2020	The housemates have gala time as they play a fun game. Later, Arya, the girl who makes everyone laugh shares the heart-breaking story of her life.
7	Dharmajan's Unexpected Entry & Exit	January 11, 2020	To everyone’s surprise, Dharmajan Bolgatty, a comic actor enters the house initially disguised as an emtrant and spends a night with the contestants with fun-filled talks. However, it was short-lived as Mohanlal asks him to come out leaving everyone else confused and sad.
8	The New Captain is Shaji	January 12, 2020	To elect a new captain, Mohanlal gives a task to Shaji, Rajithkumar and Suresh and Shaji wins. Mohanlal informs everyone that nomination and eviction will begin from the next week.
9	It's Nomination Time and Rajini breaks down.	January 13, 2020	All were asked to nominate 2 contestants to get evicted for the first time. Rajini cries to Pareekutty’s allegation and the whole inmates console her. Arya, Veena and Pareekkutty talks about Alina’s ‘dirty’ gameplan.
10	Murder task returns	January 14, 2020	Its role play time in the house! Among other characters, Bigg Boss also lets a killer on the loose with special instructions to execute murders.
11	Rajith and Raghu get appointed as the investigative officers	January 15, 2020	While the murderers are still on a killing spree, two police officers are appointed to investigate the case.
12	Rajani Chandy gets jailed; cries her heart out	January 16, 2020	Sujo and Alina lock horns. Later, the housemates are asked to pick the top performers of the week while the jail opens up for the worst of the lot.
13	Pradeep Chandran wins the captaincy task	January 17, 2020	Top performers of the week, Pradeep, Arya and Suresh are in the battle for next captaincy. Meanwhile, a misunderstanding creates a rift between Fukru and Veena.
14	Contestants to face the first nomination task of the season	January 18, 2020	It's getting hot in here! From Rajith becoming the talking point among the housemates to Mohanlal discussing the upcoming eliminations, it was an eventful day in the house.
15	Rajini Chandy gets evicted	January 19, 2020	Tension mounts in the house as the contestants get set for the first eviction of the season.
16	Somadas Quits the Show	January 20, 2020	The episode started by Somadas quitting the show due to poor health conditions. After Somadas left, all were asked to nominate 2 contestants for the second eviction. For the first time in the series's history 8 contestants were chosen to face public vote to decide the second evictee.
17	Housemates buckle up for the new weekly task	January 21, 2020	Reshma and Pradeep's closeness sparks is conversations among the housemates. Amid the hustle of luxury budget task, Rajith's comments trigger an argument.
18		January 22, 2020	With the luxury budget task already upon them, the housemates have taken another challenge - to resolve Parekutty and Fukru's fight.
19	Bigg Boss award ceremony turns into a chaos	January 23, 2020	Reshma locks horns with Rajith for folding her blanket? As the luxury budget task comes to an end, Bigg Boss surprises the housemates with special awards.
20	Fukru is the new captain	January 24, 2020	Fukru, Rajith and Veena are fighting it out to be the next captain of the house, in an unfair captaincy task.
21		January 25, 2020	Accidents, arguments, an unexpected eviction, and the daily drama. Mohanlal, certainly has a lot to discuss this week.
22	Housemates to welcome a new contestant	January 26, 2020	Mohanlal brings a shocker and a surprise as for the housemates. While more than one pack their bags today, new members step into the house as well.
23	Jazla creates a ruckus in the house	January 27, 2020	Newbie Jazla creates a ruckus in the house and finds it difficult to get along with the housemates.
24	Bigg Boss house turns into a luxury hotel	January 28, 2020	Welcome to BB hotel! Yes, that's the luxury task of the day where housemates have to please the special guests Rajith and Jazla.
25	Rajith calls Sujo ‘Pennalan’; the latter threatens to slap him	January 29, 2020	Amid the fun and excitement of the luxury budget task, Rajith ends up in a heated argument with Sujo and Jazla.
26	Bigg Boss warns Sujo and Rajith	January 30, 2020	Jazla seems to be getting on everyone's nerves and Veena is the chosen one today. While top three would fight for captaincy, the jail opens up for the worst performers.
27	Rajith Kumar is the new captain	January 31, 2020	It's conflict cooking up in the kitchen for Rajith has some qualms about water. As he along with Arya and Jazla compete for captaincy, he nails the task and wins the title.
28	Thesni Khan gets evicted; admits to not being a competitive contestant	February 1, 2020	It's that time of the week! Amid a fun task and taking Jazla and Daya to task, Mohanlal announces the result of this week's eviction.
29	Sooraj and Pavan enter the house	February 2, 2020	Mohanlal is meeting the evicted contestant, two handsome hunks make their way into the house.
30	Arya becomes the most 'deserving' contestant	February 3, 2020	The toughest decision in this game, nominations! While a few of the housemates face the heat, a task to prove how deserving are they leaves the house in splits.
31	Rajith and Reshma lock horns during task	February 4, 2020	With the luxury budget task at hand, the housemates are on a roll and the house on fire! Amid decisions and arguments, the drama is at an all time high.
32	Bigg Boss house turns into a battlefield	February 5, 2020	The housemates get all riled up as the luxury budget task continues.
33	Pashanam Shaji becomes the new captain	February 6, 2020	While the housemates happily pick the luxury goods, choosing the contenders for captaincy ain't easy.
34	Housemates are all excited about 'Rasgulla task'	February 7, 2020	What began like a worked up day turns out to be quite joyful when BB assigns a fun task to the housemates.
35	Mohanlal warns Manju for insulting Rajith	February 8, 2020	Mohanlal connects with the housemates who are under special care for their ill health. Later, the house turns into a courtroom for Manju and Rajith.
36	Mohanlal's surprise turns the housemates emotional	February 9, 2020	Housemates are emotional thanks to the special messages from their families.To cheer them up, Mohanlal throws in some tasks and a big surprise!
37	Jazla gets exempted from the elimination race	February 10, 2020	It's that time of the week again! Since the housemates who are unwell can't be nominated, options are fewer. Hence, the decision is tougher.
38	Housemates' prank leaves Daya in tears	February 11, 2020	Amid pranks and fun, the luxury budget task brings back the chaos. If that was not enough, there's another surprise awaiting the housemates.
39	Rajith accuses housemates of targeting him and Pavan	February 12, 2020	As the housemates get back from their health check-up, Pavan creates a ruckus as his luxury budget coins go missing. The house is on fire as everyone fights and steals for their points.
40	Fukru and Rajith to end up in a scuffle	February 13, 2020	What started as a fun game, brings Fukru and Rajith at loggerheads. If that wasn't enough, BB threw in a new twist leaving the housemates stupefied.
41	Pavan Thomas leaves the house due to a medical emergency	February 14, 2020	Apart from infections and allergies, love is also in the air today. As the housemates indulge in Valentine's special activities, a shock awaits them.
42	Mohanlal questions housemates about the ruckus in the house	February 15, 2020	With Mohanlal in the house, it's time for some grilling. From discussing the fights to the captaincy task, he has a lot to talk about.
43	Pradeep Chandran gets evicted	February 16, 2020	When messages from families make the housemates emotional, Mohanlal peps up the mood with an exciting game. He also has the verdict for the day.
44	Fukru and Rajith lock horns during the task	February 17, 2020	As the housemates vote for this week's nomination, a new name comes up in the list.
45	Contestants to face yet another nomination	February 18, 2020	Superheroes and supervillains in the house today! The luxury budget task leaves the housemates in splits.
46	Fukru accuses Rajith of choking him with a shawl; calls him a 'beast' while Fukru kicks Rajith on the chest	February 19, 2020	As the task continues and competition gets tough, housemates make new strategies to win.
47	Rajith and Fukru get jailed	February 20, 2020	The housemates have to take decisions - not one, but two.

=== Season 8 (2026) ===
The Complete Actor Mohanlal was the host for the eighth consecutive season. Season 8 premiered on 6th September 2026.

Ep. No.	Title	Original airing	Short summary
1	BBMS8: Season Premiere	September 6, 2026	The stage is set! Lalettan returns with a brand new season filled with glamour, excitement, and spectacular performances. What surprises lie ahead?
2	Clashes Votes, Power Moves	September 7, 2026	First day in the house, the contestants are already locking horns. But leaders emerge, and the housemates need to convince eachother why they shouldn't be evicted.
3	Surprising Mid-Week Eviction	September 8, 2026	Bigg Boss asked all the housemates to gather in the special room called "Janasabha". He asked them to choose one housemate for eviction. The final decision was given to the leader of the week, Jaseela, who chose Gayathri for eviction. Bigg Boss then evicts Gayathri out from the house
4	Bigg Boss Cuts Off the basics	September 9, 2026	The water and gas supply is cut off as the 'Palathulli Peruvellam' task begins, sparking a kitchen clash. Meanwhile, the leader faces a crucial choice over the house's food budget.
5	Cooking Chaos Without Gas	September 10, 2026	The Cooking Gas Task reaches a conclusion when Sreelakshmi and Rini clash over food serving. Everyone battles for the Jail Free Pass, but the real fight happens after the task.
6	Jail Drama and a Luxury Budget	September 11, 2026	Jail nomination turns heated as Eldho calls the ruling party a failure. Rini gets emotional with Rahul over her past case, and the housemates earn luxury budget access.
7	Mohanlal Exposes Hypocrisy	September 12, 2026	Mohanlal questions the housemates' every actions: be it Rahul's gameplay or Shijin with the luxury budget. But he has the toughest one for Jaseela regarding Gayathri's eviction.
8	The House Gets a Double Surprise	September 13, 2026	Mohanlal questions housemates' involvement and reviews their democracy paintings before a mask task exposes who they find fake. The night ends with one exit and two big surprises.
9	Season 8's First Ever Wildcards	September 14, 2026	After the season 8's first week eviction, Bigg Boss surprises the audiences and the contestants by the entrance of the season's first ever wildcards, who are chosen from Bigg Boss Agnipareeksha. Will they be the game changers of the house?
10	The Battle Begins in BB City 2.0	September 15, 2026	Gayathri makes a comeback. The Mission Road Task turns intense as teams compete to grab properties from each other. However, greed escalates the fights.
28	Shocking Mass Eviction	October 3, 2026	Bigg Boss surprises the contestants and the audiences by a mass eviction, for the first time ever in BBM.
29	The Surprise Wild Card Entrants	October 4, 2026	As the contestants and the audiences are shocked by the mass eviction, Bigg Boss now surprises with new wild card entrants. Will any of those wild cards change how the game's going now?
30	The Wildcards as New Captains	October 5, 2026	As the contestants are ready to know who is the captain for this week, Bigg Boss announces that the 4 wildcards would be the captains for the week, each for each duties in the house, such as Kitchen, Vessels, Bathroom and Floor. Other than that, they would not even work, instead it would be the contestants they choose. Will this cause some heated arguments within the housemates?
31	Suvarna walks out of the show	October 6, 2026	As the contestants were ready to take a break from the task, another surprise struck as Wildcard Suvarna quits the show regarding health issues. Apart from this, the contestants are waiting for the next exciting game.
32	The Candy-Bidding Task	October 7, 2026	Bigg Boss announces an exciting and engaging Candy-Bidding task today. As the contestants were in the edge as they can either win or lose by their luck, who would win who would give in?
33	The Re-Entry of Mridula and Anjali	October 8, 2026	As Mridula and Anjali were in Secret Room almost a week, Bigg Boss announces their secret Re-Entry to them, along with a secret task to reveal the true character of some of the contestants. The game was about to change, and the real chaos was about to begin.
34	The Contestants Rate Wildcards Captaincy	October 9, 2026	As it's the final day for the Wildcards Captaincy, Bigg Boss gives an opportunity for the inmates to rate those captaincy.
35	Tashi gets Exposed	October 10, 2026	After 2 weeks, Mohanlal came to question the contestants about their group game and other issues happened in the last 2 weeks. Middle through it Mohanlal exposes Tashi Raj as his real name is Santhosh Raj, also his behavior during the span of 2 weeks.
36	Housemates are in shock as Eldho gets evicted	October 11, 2026	To the housemates', audience and the host Mohanlal's shock, Agnipareeksha contestant Eldho George gets evicted from the show in the basis of public vote.
37	Nowfina Sabu enters as a wildcard and the nomination task	October 12, 2026	As its the day after an eviction, Bigg Boss gives a nomination task. As people gets into the nomination for this week, Nowfina Sabu enters the house as a wildcard, which makes BBMS8 the season with the most contestants in the history of any adaptation Bigg Boss.
38	Underworld 'Adholokam' Weekly Task	October 13, 2026	Bigg Boss announces the classic Underworld Task as this week's weekly task. As Mridula is the secret assassin, she manages to assassinate Don Sarasamma (Vedangi). Who would be her next target, and how will she assassinate?
39	Neha & Anjali becomes the Detectives and the end of the 'Adholokam' task	October 14, 2026	After the murder of Don Sarasamma(Vedangi) and Tashi, Bigg Boss assigns Neha and Sreeraj as detectives of the house to solve mystery of the murder. But the killer is always two steps ahead, Detective Sreeraj gets killed and Anjali joins as the new detective. Also the 'Adholokam' task ended today.
40	Killer Hunt in 'JanaSabha'	October 15, 2026	Bigg Boss calls everyone to the Janasabha to find who was the killer. If the killers isn't found, the killers would be able to participate in the captaincy task. If they didn't find both killers (Mridula & Wikky), they would get their luxury foods. Wikky & Tashi clash during the killer hunt and Wikky is caught and the mastermind escapes, but everyone misses on Mridula, where she would able to participate in the captaincy task against Azif, where she eventually becomes the captain of Week 7.
41	Heated Argument between Shijin, Sreeraj & Azif	October 16, 2026	After Sreeraj announces Mridula as the Captain, an heated argument takes place between Shijin, Sreeraj & Azif. The argument goes on all day long.
42	Host Mohanlal gifts Goutham	October 17, 2026	Host Mohanlal had promised Goutham that he would gift Goutham a pair of shirt & trousers a week prior. Just like he promised, today he gifted Goutham 2 pairs of shirts & trousers.
43	Neelina gets evicted	October 18, 2026	Neelina gets evicted from the show following the public vote, leaving Noby & Vedangi in tears.
44	Fighting With Foam	October 19, 2026	Open Nominations begin, triggering clashes. It's a day of heated verbal fights with a heavy dose of foam.
45	Ahoy! It's Gold with the Kappal Task!	October 20, 2026	A fresh task begins:Kappal Yathra, which can win an eviction-free card. There is also gold to mine and pirates to be wary of. But, in the middle of this, what is wrong with Gautham?
46	Gold Greed and a New Captain for the boat	October 21, 2026	Neha as captain, makes the boat dramas escalates, while Shijin ignites PR allegations and groupism claims. Gold mining triggers fierce clashes before one housemate secures the highest gold count.
47	Rule Breaks and Luxury	October 22, 2026	Rule breaks by Rahul and Vedangi cost the housemates their luxury budget, and all hell breaks loose. Noby and Sreeraj nearly throw hands, pulling Azif and Gautham straight into the storm.
48	Leader Issues and Best Player	October 23, 2026	Sreeraj, Tashi and Aishwarya argue over Sreeraj's undisclosed relationship. As the leader, Mridula chooses the Best Player of the week, but Neha feels hurt. The Eviction-free pass task begins.
49	Weekend Review and Big Surprises	October 24, 2026	Mohanlal revisits Noby and Sreeraj's fight, checking on women's safety. Surprise calls await the duo before the spotlight turns strictly on rule breakers for this week's budget cut.
50	Milestone Celebrations with a Twist	October 25, 2026	As Mohanlal resolves heated conflicts, the house celebrates the 50th episode with dance-offs. A new captain is chosen, followed by an unexpected eviction surprise.
51	Ticket to Week 12 Dilemma	October 26, 2026	Aiswarya takes charge as captain, leading to arguments with Tashi and Shijin. The housemates bid for a ticket-to-finale pass, but a difficult choice awaits them.
52	Bossy Tag, Tears and Lost	October 27, 2026	Aishwarya faces backlash from Sreeraj and Tashi over her leadership. Later, the remaining prize money is revealed, and an intense weekly team task begins with Rahul as Judge.
53	Sacrifices, Heartbreak and Task War	October 28, 2026	Anjali loses the captaincy race after being eliminated from the weekly task, and Shijin questions the decision. Neha and Tashi end their bond for just few days. Team Yellow and Team Purple battle for the win.
54	A Lost Dream and Boxing Ring	October 29, 2026	Nowfina loses their shot at captaincy forever. A heated five-round ring war puts the referee Rahul on the spot, with Shijin clashing over the final call.
55	The Race for Leadership Begins	October 30, 2026	Jail Nominations land Sreeraj and Rahul behind bars. Nowfina clears the air with Neha, while Wikky and Gautham battle for captaincy with team support, which Wikky wins to become the next week's captain of the house.
56	Lalettan Corners Rahul with a deal	October 31, 2026	Lalettan tests Rahul with a ₹25 lakh walkout deal and reviews his refereeing. Shijin is cleared of accusations, while three contestants are declared safe.
57	Tears and Truths with Lalettan	November 1, 2026	Lalettan kicks off the night with Kerala Piravi greetings and reviews Mridula's accusations. Neha gets an emotional parent visit, and the night concludes with Vedangi's eviction.
58	Burning Photos and Bitter Tears	November 2, 2026	While Wikky takes charge as Leader, Neha breaks down over Sreeraj's remarks. The housemates burn photos in fiery open nominations, triggering a fight between Vipin and Gautham.
59	Grabbing Missiles for Money	November 3, 2026	The house gets heated over Shijin's external PR support and Noby's game plan. Operation Last Missile begins, which gives them a chance to recover money and compete for Leadership.
60	Petty Wars and a Missing Bomb	November 4, 2026	As heated arguments break out over chores and teasing, Noby faces an early exit in the task. Meanwhile, Gautham secretly steals the real atom bomb but denies all charges.
61	All Bombs go missing	November 5, 2026	Gautham and Shijin fight over stolen bombs. Meanwhile, Mridula and Nowfina pull off a sneaky heist. Later, emotional video messages from the family leave the housemates in tears.
62	A Bitter Battle for Leadership	November 6, 2026	Operation Last Missile ends in intense struggles and two eliminations as Neha is crowned. Meanwhile, Shijin relentlessly grills Mridula over her task strategy.
63	Thalachor, Thefts and the God of Thieves	November 7, 2026	Lalettan tackles bias claims over Neha and reviews task theft drama. After grilling housemates over the missing atom bomb and fake heists, Shijin successfully wins this task and bags his prize money.
64	Diwali Delights with Lalettan	November 8, 2026	After Lalettan's weekly round-ups, Diwali in the BB House begins with a bang when the superstar enters the house. Food, gifts and entertainment abound, but Nowfina gets evicted following the public vote.
