= List of 90 Day Fiancé: Happily Ever After? episodes =

90 Day Fiancé: Happily Ever After? is an American reality television series on TLC.

== Cast ==
Couples	Original Series	Seasons								
Couples	Original Series	1	2	3	4	5	6	7	8	9
Russ & Paola	90 Day Fiancé Season 1	Main								
Brett & Daya	90 Day Fiancé Season 2	Main								
Danielle & Mohamed	90 Day Fiancé Season 2	Main								
Melanie & Devar	90 Day Fiancé Season 3	Main								
Kyle & Noon	90 Day Fiancé Season 3	Main								
Loren & Alexei	90 Day Fiancé Season 3	Main							Main	
Jorge & Anfisa	90 Day Fiancé Season 4		Main							
Chantel & Pedro	90 Day Fiancé Season 4		Main							
Molly & Luis	90 Day Fiancé Season 5			Main						
David & Annie	90 Day Fiancé Season 5			Main						
Nicole & Azan	90 Day Fiancé Season 5			Main						
Elizabeth & Andrei	90 Day Fiancé Season 5				Main					Main
Ashley & Jay	90 Day Fiancé Season 6				Main					
Colt & Larissa	90 Day Fiancé Season 6				Main					
Kalani & Asuelu	90 Day Fiancé Season 6					Main				
Paul & Karine	Before the 90 Days Season 1 + 2					Main				
Tania & Syngin	90 Day Fiancé Season 7					Main				
Angela & Michael	90 Day Fiancé Season 7					Main				
Tiffany & Ronald	The Other Way Season 1						Main			
Brandon & Julia	90 Day Fiancé Season 8						Main			Main
Mike & Natalie	90 Day Fiancé Season 8						Main			
Jovi & Yara	90 Day Fiancé Season 8						Main			Main
Ed & Liz	The Single Life Season 1 + 2							Main		
Kim & Usman	Before The 90 Days Season 5							Main		
Sumit & Jenny	The Other Way Season 1-3							Main		
Bilal & Shaeeda	90 Day Fiancé Season 9							Main		
Gino & Jasmine	Before The 90 Days Season 5 + 6								Main	
Patrick & Thaís	90 Day Fiancé Season 9								Main	
Nicole & Mahmoud	The Other Way Season 4								Main	
Emily & Kobe	90 Day Fiancé Season 9								Main	
Sophie & Rob	90 Day Fiancé Season 10								Main	
Ashley & Manuel	90 Day Fiancé Season 10								Main	

== Series overview ==
Season	Episodes	Originally released	
Season	Episodes	First released	Last released
1	12	September 11, 2016	November 13, 2016
2	12	June 25, 2017	September 10, 2017
3	11	May 20, 2018	July 29, 2018
4	14	April 28, 2019	July 28, 2019
5	18	June 14, 2020	October 5, 2020
6	17	April 25, 2021	August 22, 2021
7	21	August 28, 2022	January 22, 2023
8	21	March 17, 2024	August 4, 2024

== Episodes ==
=== Season 1 (2016) ===
No. overall	No. in season	Title	Original release date
1	1	"It's Only the Beginning"	September 11, 2016
2	2	"It's My Secret to Tell"	September 18, 2016
3	3	"Something's Up"	September 25, 2016
4	4	"What Don't I Know?"	October 2, 2016
5	5	"The Truth Hurts"	October 9, 2016
6	6	"Facing the Past"	October 16, 2016
7	7	"Destination Impossible"	October 23, 2016
8	8	"You Can't Run..."	October 30, 2016
9	9	"I Came All This Way"	October 30, 2016
10	10	"The Roles Reverse"	November 6, 2016
11	11	"Tell All (Part 1)"	November 6, 2016
12	12	"Tell All (Part 2)"	November 13, 2016

=== Season 2 (2017) ===
No. overall	No. in season	Title	Original release date
13	1	"Happy Wife, Happy Life?"	June 25, 2017
14	2	"When the Past Catches Up"	July 2, 2017
15	3	"We Got Bad Blood"	July 9, 2017
16	4	"Family Secrets"	July 16, 2017
17	5	"Lost in Translation"	July 23, 2017
18	6	"Lies & Goodbyes"	July 30, 2017
19	7	"Models, Moms & Meltdowns"	August 6, 2017
20	8	"I Do's & I Don'ts"	August 13, 2017
21	9	"Where Do We Go From Here?"	August 20, 2017
22	10	"Tell All (Part 1)"	August 27, 2017
23	11	"Tell All (Part 2)"	September 3, 2017
24	12	"Tell All (Part 3)"	September 10, 2017

=== Season 3 (2018) ===
No. overall	No. in season	Title	Original release date
25	1	"Home Sweet Home?"	May 20, 2018
26	2	"Disruptive Behavior"	May 27, 2018
27	3	"There Is Something They Don't Know"	June 3, 2018
28	4	"Boiling Point"	June 10, 2018
29	5	"The Blame Game"	June 17, 2018
30	6	"Big Little Lies"	June 24, 2018
31	7	"Not Off the Hook"	July 1, 2018
32	8	"No Turning Back"	July 8, 2018
33	9	"The End of the Line"	July 15, 2018
34	10	"Tell All (Part 1)"	July 22, 2018
35	11	"Tell All (Part 2)"	July 29, 2018

=== Season 4 (2019) ===
No. overall	No. in season	Title	Original release date
36	1	"After the Dust Settles"	April 28, 2019
37	2	"In for a Shock"	May 5, 2019
38	3	"Mistrials of Marriage"	May 12, 2019
39	4	"A Break Is Necessary"	May 19, 2019
40	5	"Dirty Dancing"	May 26, 2019
41	6	"Severed Ties"	June 2, 2019
42	7	"Into the Lions Den"	June 9, 2019
43	8	"Nowhere to Run"	June 16, 2019
44	9	"The Truth Comes Out"	June 23, 2019
45	10	"Sparks Will Fly"	June 30, 2019
46	11	"Kicked to the Curb"	July 7, 2019
47	12	"Change of Heart"	July 14, 2019
48	13	"Colt and Larissa: Judgement Day + Tell All (Part 1)"	July 21, 2019
49	14	"Tell All (Part 2)"	July 28, 2019

=== Season 5 (2020) ===
No. overall	No. in season	Title	Original release date
50	1	"What Goes Around, Comes Around"	June 14, 2020
51	2	"Caught in the Crossfire"	June 21, 2020
52	3	"Seeds of Discontent"	June 28, 2020
53	4	"She's a Wolf"	July 5, 2020
54	5	"Drive Me Crazy Like a Roulette Wheel"	July 12, 2020
55	6	"Ultimatums and Ugly Truths"	July 19, 2020
56	7	"The Best Mistake of My Life"	July 26, 2020
57	8	"Hell Hath No Fury"	August 2, 2020
58	9	"Burnt Bridges and Bitter Truths"	August 9, 2020
59	10	"Drawing the Line"	August 16, 2020
60	11	"Public Displays of Contention"	August 23, 2020
61	12	"Compromising Positions"	August 30, 2020
62	13	"Hot Tempers and Cold Feet"	September 6, 2020
63	14	"To Love and to Obey?"	September 13, 2020
64	15	"Point of No Return"	September 20, 2020
65	16	"Tell All (Part 1)"	September 27, 2020
66	17	"Tell All (Part 2)"	October 4, 2020
67	18	"Tell All (Part 3)"	October 5, 2020

=== Season 6 (2021) ===
No. overall	No. in season	Title	Original release date
68	1	"Be Careful What You Ask For"	April 25, 2021
69	2	"Indecent Proposal"	May 2, 2021
70	3	"Forgiving Is Not Forgetting"	May 9, 2021
71	4	"Damage Control"	May 16, 2021
72	5	"Love Takes Hostages"	May 23, 2021
73	6	"Fear and Loathing"	May 30, 2021
74	7	"Troubled Waters"	June 6, 2021
75	8	"All Shook Up"	June 13, 2021
76	9	"Not so Silent Partners"	June 20, 2021
77	10	"Shadows of Doubt"	June 27, 2021
78	11	"Man Up or Shut Up"	July 11, 2021
79	12	"Bubble Baths and Family Wraths"	July 18, 2021
80	13	"Let's Talk About Sex..."	July 25, 2021
81	14	"She's a Snake in the Grass"	August 1, 2021
82	15	"Time Does Not Heal All Wounds"	August 8, 2021
83	16	"Tell All (Part 1)"	August 15, 2021
84	17	"Tell All (Part 2)"	August 22, 2021

=== Season 7 (2022–23) ===
No. overall	No. in season	Title	Original release date
85	1	"Suddenly Everything Has Changed"	August 28, 2022
86	2	"Truth, Bitter Truth"	September 4, 2022
87	3	"Don't Take Me for Granted"	September 11, 2022
88	4	"Truth Hurts"	September 18, 2022
89	5	"Complicated"	September 25, 2022
90	6	"Outta My System"	October 2, 2022
91	7	"Are You Happy Now?"	October 9, 2022
92	8	"Under Pressure"	October 16, 2022
93	9	"Bad Blood"	October 23, 2022
94	10	"Just Give Me a Reason"	October 30, 2022
95	11	"Meet Me Halfway"	November 6, 2022
96	12	"Isn't She Lovely"	November 13, 2022
97	13	"Can't Fight This Feeling"	November 20, 2022
98	14	"Stand by Me"	November 27, 2022
99	15	"Battlefield"	December 4, 2022
100	16	"Wrecking Ball"	December 11, 2022
101	17	"Thank You, Next"	December 18, 2022
102	18	"Tell All: No Limits (Part 1)"	January 1, 2023
103	19	"Tell All: No Limits (Part 2)"	January 8, 2023
104	20	"Tell All: No Limits (Part 3)"	January 15, 2023
105	21	"Tell All: No Limits (Part 4)"	January 22, 2023

=== Season 8 (2024) ===
No. overall	No. in season	Title	Original release date
106	1	"Once Upon a Rocky Relationship"	March 17, 2024
107	2	"The Princess and the Pea Brain"	March 24, 2024
108	3	"Snow White and the Seven Chores"	March 31, 2024
109	4	"The Boy Who Cried Divorce"	April 7, 2024
110	5	"Fuss in Boots"	April 14, 2024
111	6	"The Itsy Bitsy Liar"	April 21, 2024
112	7	"Humpty Dumped Me"	April 28, 2024
113	8	"Three Blind Wives"	May 5, 2024
114	9	"The Lovely Duckling"	May 12, 2024
115	10	"The Couples Grim"	May 19, 2024
116	11	"Weeping Beauty"	May 26, 2024
117	12	"Pornocchio"	June 2, 2024
118	13	"The Liar, the Witch and the Postnup"	June 9, 2024
119	14	"Malice in Wonderland"	June 16, 2024
120	15	"Jack and the Visa Talk"	June 23, 2024
121	16	"The Emperors New Home"	June 30, 2024
122	17	"The Troll Toll"	July 7, 2024
123	18	"The Big Bad Heartbreak"	July 14, 2024
124	19	"And They All Lived"	July 21, 2024
125	20	"Tell All (Part 1)"	July 28, 2024
126	21	"Tell All (Part 2)"	August 4, 2024
