= List of 2000s Super Bowl commercials =

This is a list of Super Bowl commercials that played during the 2000s. This article does not list advertisements for a local region or station (e.g. promoting local news shows), pre-kickoff and post-game commercials/sponsors, or in-game advertising sponsors and television bumpers.

== 2000 (XXXIV) ==
This year was known for its many commercials for websites, with 17 websites posing commercials. Many became defunct after the "dot-com Bowl".

Product type	Product/title	Plot/notes
Beer	Bud Light "Elevator"	A man tries to hold the elevator by putting his arm in the door. The bad news is that he has a six-pack of bud Light in his hand, which the others in the elevator steal.
Beer	Bud Light "Cat"	A woman tells her boyfriend that her cat doesn't like anyone who takes her Bud Light. He ignores her by reaching for a Bud Light. That is, until the cat turns out to be a tiger.
Beer	Budweiser "Photo Shoot"	Louie and Frankie document a scandal which focuses on a 1979 summer photo shoot where the ferret posed nude.
Beer	Budweiser "Which Game?"	In a continuation of their "Whassup?" ad campaign, three men at a bar are on the phone with a guy ("Dookie") allegedly watching the game. Their question: "Whassup?"
Beer	Budweiser "Rex's Motivation"	A dog is not crying in a movie scene, so the director tells the dog to think back to his worst day. The dog's worst day was jumping over a hedge to chase a Budweiser truck, only to ram head first into the side of a lawn care truck. The dog then gives the howl of his life.
Candy	M&M's "Sexy Girl"	Men and women are all impressed by a green M&M walking down the street.
Car	Oldsmobile "In Cars"	In what first appears to be an ad for the Gap, a group of teenagers sing the Gary Numan song "Cars" before an Oldsmobile Alero drives into the screen.
Credit card	Visa "Swimmers"	The announcer decide to take a break from commercialization and focuses on the 2000 Olympic Games with female swimmers swimming. They then spelled out "VISA", and the announcer ends their break, and says that Visa is the official card of the Olympic Games.
Film	Gladiator	Movie promos
Film	Mission to Mars	Movie promos
Film	Titan A.E.	Movie promos
Mail	FedEx "Combat Rangers"	Combat Rangers action figures are all wearing dresses. The toy makers found that the wrong shipping company got the wrong dresses in China.
Mail	FedEx "The Lollipop Guild"	While greeting Dorothy, the Lollipop Guild lose their high voices. A FedEx truck delivers three balloons to the group, they inhale the helium, and continue the greeting.
Soft drink	Mountain Dew "Mock Opera"	Spoof of Bohemian Rhapsody, both the song and video.
TV	Oxygen "Baby Girl Power"	At a maternity ward, a pink cap for a baby girl is found on the floor. Soon, all the babies take off their caps, signifying they should not be categorized.
Website	AutoTrader.com "I Need a Car"	A man stands in a vast, featureless white room. He says, "I need a car." Countless cars zoom past him, which are narrowed down based on his choices.
Website	Britannica.com "Untitled"	In a completely silent TV spot, a bunch of random questions appear on the screen, such as "who keeps the coin after the coin toss?" and "where do Buffalo wings come from?" Then it ends with britannica.com logo with tagline "what's on your mind?"
Website	Computer.com "Mike and Mike"	To get opinions on Computer.com, we watch interviews with the creators' mother, college buddy, nephew, and uncle.
Website	e1040.com "Charity"	An accountant asks a client if he gave anything to charity. The man exclaims that he gave a mint to "charity", who turns out to be a woman.
Website	EDS "Cat Herders"	We take a look at the tough and drama-filled job of being a cat herder. Director: John O'Hagan
Website	Epidemic.com "Bathroom"	A man washes his hands and receives money for it. He sneezes and the same thing happens.
Website	E*Trade "Wasted 2 Million"	Two men and a monkey dance to "La Cucaracha". Then, the screen makes fun of the money being spent by websites on Super Bowl ads by saying: "Well, we just wasted two million bucks."
Website	E*Trade "Out the Wazoo"	A man is rushed to the ER. Doctors discover that he has money "coming out the wazoo".
Website	E*Trade "Basketball Prodigy"	A young man scores the winning goal in a basketball game. His coach tells him that he's a natural. The player then declares that he wants to dance for a career.
Website	e-stamp.com "Time Saving Tips"	A man who owns his own business is shown shredding paper. A voice asks if he really has time for this. The man realizes he can throw the papers into his backyard and shred them by mowing his lawn. The voice congratulates him and suggests that he use e-stamp.com to buy postage.
Website	Hotjobs.com "Negotiations"	Two businessmen negotiate with a giant, light-up mouse-pointer hand. The hand mocks the first businessman's suggestions, noting that "A startup in Frisco made a mockery of your signing bonus." The businessman tells the hand "I don't like you."
Website	Kforce "Looking for a Job"	A man leads someone through the red-light district of a city. After walking through a door marked "JOBS", he falls down a chute into a desert. Images of Kforce.com at work are then shown.
Website	LastMinuteTravel.com "Tornado"	Two cowboys set up lawn chairs and watch an incoming tornado. They discuss one man's recent trip to Barbados as the tornado sucks the other man away at the last minute.
Website	LifeMinders.com "The Worst Commercial"	On yellow paper in typing while "Chopsticks" is played on piano, a message says: "This is the worst commercial on the Super Bowl. But it might be the best thing you see tonight. Introducing LifeMinders.com. We send highly personalized emails on topics you ask for. Free. No junk. How can we do all this with 7.5 million members? We're information experts (geeks). But we don't know diddly about making ads."
Website	MicroStrategy "Fraud"	A voice over a cell phone helps a man to reschedule a flight. When he tries to pay for it with a credit card, the voice alerts police that the man is impersonating the real cardholder.
Website	MicroStrategy "Stock Alert"	A woman in an airport uses her mobile device to trade stocks
Website	Monster.com "The Road Less Travelled"	A woman stands on a street corner in a city. Various people walking past her recite "The Road Not Taken" by Robert Frost.
Website	OnMoney.com "Paper Monster"	A man sits in a room with papers scattered everywhere. The papers gather into the shape of a monster and assault him. He survives by opening his laptop, which sucks the paper monster inside of it.
Website	Netpliance "Webhead"	Various images of people wearing glasses with tape across the middle are shown. A voice asks what would happen if everyone could access the internet without a computer.
Website	OurBeginning.com "Invites"	Soon-to-be-married brides fight with each other at a wedding invitation store
Website	Pets.com "If You Leave Me Now"	When pets are left home, the Pets.com sockpuppet sings the Chicago song "If You Leave Me Now"
Website	WebMD "Ali"	A close-up video of Muhammad Ali shadowboxing is shown. On-screen text makes obscure references to circumventing the healthcare system.

== 2001 (XXXV) ==
Product type	Product/title	Plot/notes
Beer	Bud Light "Chow Down"	To make space for a case of Bud Light in a fridge that is filled with food from top to bottom, a man gives his dog some food from that fridge. The ad then cuts to the guy with his female partner enjoying a Bud Light. When she asks where the dog is at, the dog walks in and is now very fat from all the food eaten.
Beer	Budweiser "Neighbors"	Anthemic spot centered around the people who produce Budweiser beer.
Beer	Budweiser "We Are Not Alone"	A dog is abducted by aliens. It is revealed that the dog is actually an alien in disguise. When the leader asks what he has learned, the alien quotes the Whassup? line. It soon catches on with the alien, and an alien intelligence agency finally detects the race.
Beer	Budweiser "What Are You Doing?"	A commercial plays that shows sharply dressed men parodying the Whassup? commercials with the line "What are you doing?" It is then revealed to be a commercial watched by the men from the Whassup? commercials.
Film	Exit Wounds	Movie promos
Film	The Fast and the Furious	Movie promos
Film	Hannibal	Movie promos
Film	A Knight's Tale	Movie promos
Film	Swordfish	Movie promos
Film	The Mummy Returns	Movie promos
Food	George Foreman Grill "Colors"	People dance to celebrate the five new colors the George Foreman Grill comes in
Gaming	PlayStation 2 "Future"	A future commercial advertises the PS9
Hotel	Motel 6 "Refs"	Football referees stay at a Motel 6
Retail	Target "Beautiful World - Red"	The ad starts with a trio of young adults, who live in a world where everything around them is the color white, put on a pair of sunglasses and makes everything become the color red. The trio, along with a poodle, enter a building and use several red colored products that are sold at Target, such as Coca-Cola soda and Big Red gum. Devo's "Beautiful World" plays during the ad.
Soft drink	Diet Dr Pepper "Hudson Riverdance"	Riverdance is performed by a group of heavy-set men wearing tank tops and kilts
Soft drink	Pepsi "The Best Pepsi Ad Ever"	The winner of the online poll for the best Pepsi commercial that aired during the Super Bowl is announced. The winning commercial is played: the 1992 Cindy Crawford commercial.
Soft drink	Pepsi "Bob Dole"	Bob Dole does a spoof on his erectile dysfunction commercials by using Pepsi as the product. Pepsi helps him feel young again, as he does a backflip. Cast: Bob Dole, Eric Stonestreet
Soft drink	Pepsi "Rollercoaster"	A man brings a full cup of Pepsi on a rollercoaster. Somehow, he manages to spill none of it on the ride. Later, an attractive woman asks him for the time, and he spills the Pepsi on his shirt. The rollercoaster shown in this commercial is Alpengeist, a B&M inverted coaster at Busch Gardens Williamsburg.
Website	E*Trade "Ghost Town"	In a spoof of the famous 1970s Crying Indian commercial, the chimp from last year's popular E*Trade commercial wanders through a ghost town on a pony. Several deserted dot-com businesses are seen, referring to the various dot-com companies which went bankrupt partly due to their commercials last year. The chimp sheds a tear for the corpse of the Pets.com sock puppet dog.
Website	HotJobs.com "Gravity Balls"	A gravity ball breaks free, rolls out of an office and into a children's marble game. Soundtrack: Go Where You Wanna Go by The Mamas & the Papas
Wireless	Cingular Wireless "Dancer"	A man dances to the theme from Peter and the Wolf
Wireless	Cingular Wireless "Touchdown Dance School"	Several pro football players attend a touchdown dance class led by a ballet instructor Cast: Kevin Gogan, Marvin Harrison, Donald Willis, and Damien Woody

== 2002 (XXXVI) ==
Product type	Product/title	Plot/notes
Beer	Budweiser "Clydesdale Respect"	As a tribute to the victims of the September 11th attacks, Budweiser produced a one-time-only advertisement. The commercial shows the Budweiser Clydesdales walking across the Brooklyn Bridge into New York City. They then stopped, gazed at the ruined New York skyline, and bowed in reverence and respect. The commercial aired only once, but was available on the website for a period of one year. Two different modern takes on this commercial aired decades later: first in 2011 with the newly built One World Trade Center in the background skyline, and again in 2021 with additional structures on the World Trade Center site (including 3 and 4 World Trade Center) now completed as well as Tribute in Light illuminating the sunset sky.
Beer	Budweiser "Greeting Card"	A couple selects greeting cards for each other. A woman takes her time, going through several cards at a retail store, while a man grabs the first card he sees at a convenience store counter; while purchasing a case of Budweiser.
Beer	Budweiser "Out of Towner"	In a continuation of Budweiser's "Jersey Guys" ad campaign, a man wearing a cowboy hat takes a seat at a bar, where he is asked "How ya doin?" by the bartender. He replies, "Well, thanks for asking! I'm doing fine; just got in today. My brother in law picked me up at the airport; mighty big airport y'all got here. And the people here are so nice!" He repeats this to two other men entering the bar who ask him, "How ya doin?"
Candy	M&M's "Hotel"	A man is shown checking into a hotel. He accepts multiple offers from the concierge, including a "complimentary chocolate" on his pillow. The ad then cuts to the man's room, where the Red M&M is lying on his pillow.
Credit card	Visa "Race"	Michael Johnson & Jason Sehorn are a track; about face each other in a race. Just before the gun fires, a third entrant appears; a jockey riding a horse named "Lightning Bolt". The race begins with Johnson in the lead but then Bolt overtakes Johnson for the top spot. However, right when that takes place, another entrant appears; John Andretti in his NASCAR Stock Car. The ad ends with Andretti taking off and the other three contestants sprinting off in cartoonish fashion.
Film	Austin Powers in Goldmember	TV promo
Film	Bad Company	TV promo
Film	Blade II	TV promo
Film	Collateral Damage	TV promo
Film	Hart's War	TV promo
Film	Men in Black II	TV promo
Film	Signs	TV promo
Film	Spider-Man	TV promo, which gained popularity
Food	Lipton Brisk "Puppet Strike"	A puppet version of Danny DeVito is fired, as the new Brisk is so good, it sells itself. This causes all the puppets from the Lipton Brisk commercials to go on strike.
Gaming	Madden NFL 2002	TV promo
Soft drink	Pepsi "Now and Then"	Britney Spears sings an updated version of "The Joy of Pepsi" jingle (which was first introduced in 1999) in 1958, 1963, 1966, 1970, 1989, and the present day. Director: Joe Pytka; cast: Britney Spears
Soft drink	Pepsi	The full version of the 1958 sequence from the "Now and Then" commercial is shown, as chosen by an online poll.
Satellite radio	XM Satellite Radio	
Website	Yahoo! "Dolphin"	A man is walking in the waters near an island when he meets a talking dolphin. The man says he found the island on Yahoo!. The dolphin then admits it learned to talk on Yahoo! as well.

== 2003 (XXXVII) ==
Product type	Product/title	Plot/notes
Appliance	George Foreman Grill "I Grill With George"	Several families are shown saying "I Grill With George" along with George Foreman himself
Beer	Bud Light "Parade"	A man in an upside-down clown suit, walks into a bar and orders a Bud Light
Car	Cadillac "17th Street"	The ad begins with a man in the 1950s boarding a subway train. As he approaches his seat on the train car, he notices a Cadillac advertisement outside his window, featuring the Eldorado. The train begins moving, and several more Eldorado advertisements are passed by before exiting the tunnel, where this time a real Eldorado appears. Just as the Eldorado shows up, several modern Cadillac models (CTS, Escalade, SRX, XLR) appear as well, before the train car stops. When the man walks out of the train car, we see him now dressed in contemporary clothing and the setting has changed to the 2000s. Soundtrack: "Rock and Roll" by Led Zeppelin
Car	Chrysler "Celine Dion"	Celine Dion drives a Chrysler Crossfire while singing "I Drove All Night".
Car	Dodge "Beef Jerky"	A man riding in a speeding Dodge Ram chokes on a piece of beef jerky and clears his throat when the truck stops.
Chewing gum	Trident "Squirrel"	Five dentists are given a survey: to see if they recommend Trident Gum or not. The first four say "Yes", but a squirrel bites the last dentist and screams "No"; thus, leaving the total of recommendations, 4 out 5.
Clothing	Hanes "Tagless"	Jackie Chan gets irritated by the tag on the back of his shirt before being introduced to the tagless shirt from Hanes. Also starring: Michael Jordan
Clothing	Levi's "Stampede"	A couple stands on an empty road, in a city, and lets a pack of buffalos run right thru them.
Clothing	Reebok "Terry Tate, Office Linebacker"	A linebacker named Terry Tate is hired to keep employees busy and on task; tackling them whenever they are being lazy or making mistakes.
Credit card	MasterCard "Presidents"	A man opts to use his credit card instead of cash, when out on a date, leaving a trio of presidents (Andrew Jackson, Abraham Lincoln, and George Washington) waiting impatiently for the man to arrive home.
Electronics	Sony "The Trip"	An elderly man prepares himself for a trip into outer space. Soundtrack: "Carry On" by Alana Davis
Film	Anger Management	Movie promos
Film	Bad Boys II	Movie promos
Film	Bruce Almighty	Movie promos
Film	Charlie's Angels: Full Throttle	Movie promos
Film	Daredevil	Movie promos
Film	Gods and Generals	Movie promos
Film	Hulk	Movie promos
Film	The Matrix Reloaded	Movie promos
Film	Tears of the Sun	Movie promos
Film	Terminator 3: Rise of the Machines	Movie promos
Mail	FedEx "Cast Away"	Is the final scene of the 2000 film of the same name where Chuck returns the package to its sender. But in this version the woman answers the door; when Chuck asks what was in the box, the woman replies, "Just a satellite phone, GPS locator, fishing rod, water purifier and some seeds. Just silly stuff."
Phone	AT&T Wireless "Antiques Bandwagon"	Parodying Antiques Roadshow, a man brings a landline telephone on the show, to see how much it is worth. The ad ends with the host of the show telling the man that the worth of the phone is $0.
Phone	AT&T Wireless "Gilligan"	Gilligan from Gilligan's Island uses a cell phone and has the Coast Guard on speed dial; allowing them to rescue the cast from being stranded.
Restaurant	McDonald's "What A Day"	A father and son bond over the long, stressful days they both experienced
Restaurant	Quiznos "Chef Jimmy"	A chef named Jimmy has a one-track mind, focusing only on the taste of Quiznos subs while ignoring things like his dead bird and the lack of wearing pants.
Restaurant	Subway "Dream"	Jared Fogle dreams of having a Subway inside his house
Soft drink	Diet Pepsi "Muddy Concert"	A father and son enjoy a MxPx concert
Soft drink	Sierra Mist "Hydrant"	During a hot day, a dog knocks the cap off of a fire hydrant, causing a huge blast of water to spray all over the dog's owner
Soft drink	Sierra Mist "Zoo"	Two baboons build a catapult and one of them launches the other into the polar bear section of a zoo; in order to cool off from the heat
Sports drink	Gatorade "23 vs. 39"	39-year-old Michael Jordan plays a one-on-one game of basketball with a 23-year-old version of himself
Tax preparation	H&R Block "Willie"	Willie Nelson becomes the spokesperson for a shaving cream company
Website	HotJobs.com "Rainbow"	Various workers sing "Rainbow Connection"
Website	Monster.com "Truck"	A driverless semi-truck causes havoc while in search for a driver

== 2004 (XXXVIII) ==
Product type	Product/title	Plot/notes
Beer	Budweiser "Donkey"	A donkey narrates his life story, where he dreams of becoming a Budweiser Clydesdale. He trains and trains, even going to the trouble of putting puffy hooves on his feet. When his job interview comes, the five Clydesdale horses ask why he should become a Clydesdale. He responds with a donkey sound, and gets the job.
Car	Chevrolet "Big"	A group of tall basketball players step into a Chevy Aveo, only to appear small inside the car
Car	Chevrolet "Soap"	The way kids react to the new Chevy SSR causes them to get soap in their mouths
Car	Dodge "Monkey"	To get a literal monkey off his back, a man visits his local Dodge dealer and purchases a new Dodge Magnum station wagon.
Car	Ford "The One"	A Ford GT is shown driven at speed on a racetrack
Credit card	MasterCard "Errands"	Homer Simpson is doing some errands such as buying beer instead of diapers, an oil change, and a haircut. Homer seems to know of the narrator's existence, finally being fed up with him at Moe's Bar, muttering the words "stupid voice-over guy".
Credit card	Visa "Snowball"	A game of volleyball is played in the snow; promoting the 2004 Summer Olympics Cast: Misty May-Treanor & Kerri Walsh Jennings
Gaming	PlayStation 2 "Going Back"	TV promo for Jet Li: Rise to Honor (the full Version of "Going Back" aired later)
Film	50 First Dates	Movie promos
Film	Hidalgo	Movie promos
Film	Starsky & Hutch	Movie promos
Film	Secret Window	Movie promos
Film	The Alamo	Movie promos
Film	Troy	Movie promos
Film	Van Helsing	Movie promos
Phone	Nextel "Junior"	Dale Earnhardt Jr. scores a touchdown in his Chevy Monte Carlo NASCAR Stock Car
Potato chips	Lay's "Dentures"	A teen drops a bag of Lay's chips. An elderly woman tries to get the chips, only to get knocked over by an elderly man's cane. The man grabs the bag, only to realize that the woman has his dentures. The teen comes back and takes the Lay's chips, and plants a kiss on the man.
PSA	Truth "Shards O'Glass"	An executive for a popsicle company, "Shards O' Glass," provides disclaimers for their product – a popsicle with shards of glass in it, clearly unsafe and deadly – and posed the question, "What if all companies sold products like tobacco?"
Restaurant	Taco Bell "Clubbing"	Three guys go "nightclubbing" at a Taco Bell
Soft drink	7 Up "Slam Dunk	People try to win $1,000, by trying to dunk a basketball on the back a moving truck advertising a slam dunk competition for 7 Up and driven by Godfrey.
Soft drink	Pepsi "Bear's Disguise"	When two grizzly bears rob a cottage, they find no Pepsi anywhere. One of the bears steals the resident's ID and disguises himself as the person. Then, he buys Pepsi at a convenience store.
Soft drink	Pepsi "Hendrix"	In Seattle in 1953, a young Jimi Hendrix walks down a city sidewalk. When he sees a Pepsi machine and Coke machine, he chooses the Pepsi machine. At the machine, he sees a Fender Telecaster electric guitar in a pawn shop. If he had gone to the Coke machine, he would have bought an accordion. The screen then says, "Whew...that was a close one." In the background, Hendrix's "Purple Haze" is playing; at first as the original recording, then on accordion.
Soft drink	Sierra Mist "Fire Escape"	To avoid the heat, a man jumps from the balcony at his apartment and lands in an ice-cold water pitcher. The ad ends with his dog following suit and landing in a glass of water next to him.
Tax preparation	H&R Block "Willie Doll"	A fake Willie Nelson doll is promoted; that gives customers "advice" on taxes and finances
Television network	NFL Network "Tomorrow"	Various NFL personnel who didn't make it to the Super Bowl sing Tomorrow from Annie Cast: LaVar Arrington, Tony Gonzalez, Dante Hall, Al Harris, Priest Holmes, Torry Holt, Jerry Jones, Mike McKenzie, Terrell Owens, Bill Parcells, Warren Sapp, Michael Strahan, Jason Taylor, Zach Thomas
Toilet paper	Charmin "Snap"	During a football game, a team is about to run a play and attempt a touchdown. The quarterback, however, gets distracted by the softness of the Charmin toilet paper that is hanging from the center's waistband. Due to holding the game up, the quarterback gets penalized and leaves his teammates frustrated. The team wonders why their towels were replaced with toilet paper, before the Charmin Bear (in the form of a sports team mascot) reveals himself to be one who did it.
Web portal	AOL "Car"	A car built by the Orange County Choppers trio of Mikey, Paul Jr, and Paul Teutul Sr. and powered by AOL's 9.0 Top Speed technology, sends Mikey back to the Renaissance.
Web portal	AOL "Motorcycle"	Mikey, Paul Jr, and Paul Sr. build a chopper that runs on AOL's 9.0 Top Speed Speed technology. The trio attempts to jump the bike over a row of cement trucks, but the bike is so powerful, it ends up flying outside of the race track they are at, leaving Mikey with a neck brace.
Web portal	AOL "Slow Ride"	Paul Teutul Sr., Jr., and Mikey use AOL's 9.0 Top Speed technology to power a mobile scooter. When performing a test run of the scooter, it ends up shooting Mikey into the sky.

== 2005 (XXXIX) ==
Product type	Product/title	Plot/notes
Bank	MBNA "Gladys Knight	Gladys Knight joins a rugby game with the England national rugby union team and scores a try
Beer	Bud Light "Picture Phone"	Two guys at a Football game send photos to another friend who isn't at the game. The friend who isn't at the game responds by sending photos of him at the apartment that belongs to one of the guys at game and with that guy's girlfriend.
Beer	Bud Light "The Lady"	At a bar, a man tries to impress a woman by buying her a Bud Light. However, a talking cockatoo intervenes and aggressively trash-talks the man.
Beer	Bud Light "Skydiving"	A skydiver instructor tries to offer a case of Bud Light to a skydiver, who is to afraid to jump, only to have the pilot grab the case and jump out of the plane.
Beer	Budweiser "Audition"	All kinds of animals come to the Budweiser Clydesdale farm to become a Clydesdale. A driver looks at the donkey from last year's Budweiser commercial and says, "Now look what you've started."
Beer	Budweiser "Dance"	At a crowded bar, Cedric the Entertainer uses various hand gestures to inform someone that he is the designated driver. The gestures being made, ends up becoming a dance that everyone in the bar partakes in.
Beer	Budweiser "Welcome Home"	Pedestrians are in an airport, minding their own business. People start clapping. Then, everyone is clapping, as it is revealed they are clapping for soldiers coming home from war. At the end, a title card says, "Thank you." Director: Joe Pytka.
Beer	Budweiser Select "Pucker Up"	Spot promoting the introduction of Budweiser Select beer
Beer	Heineken "Beer Run"	Brad Pitt buys a six-pack of Heineken at a corner shop. Soon, he is being chased by a mob of paparazzi. It ends with an anonymous phone call. Director: David Fincher
Car	Cadillac "Barrels"	Three Cadillac V-Series cars slowly pull into a tunnel before coming to a stop, similar to that of a bullet being placed inside a gun. Each car lights up, revs, and quickly takes off and rockets out of the tunnel. The ad ends with the narrator saying "Bang". Soundtrack: Rock and Roll by Led Zeppelin
Car	Ford "Gang"	A tough biker gang is going to the bar, only to be scared off by Fords
Car	Ford "Greenlight"	A man, dressed in warm weather clothing, is frozen in a Ford Mustang Convertible
Car	Honda "Belt Buckle"	Shows a montage of various belt buckles that cowboys wear before ending on a Honda belt buckle. Promotes the Honda Ridgeline truck. Voice Over: Clancy Brown
Car	Honda "Peaks"	A Honda Ridgeline is shown driving up and down an off-road peak. Narration by Clancy Brown
Car	Toyota "Move Forward"	In a world where, everyone is moving in place, the Toyota Prius is the only thing moving in motion
Car	Volvo "Boldy Go"	Richard Branson is launched into space in a rocket ship, with a giant bumper sticker slapped onto the rocket that reads "My Other Vehicle Is A Volvo XC90 V8". The ad also promoted a sweepstakes where one could win a trip to space, via Virgin Galactic.
Chewing gum	Bubblicious "Spotlight"	LeBron James walks on to a basketball court and blows a bubble
Contact lenses	O2 Optix "Inside The O"	People walk around with giant O2's in front of them, to represent their usage of O2 Optix contact lenses
Countertop	Silestone "Diana Pearl"	Mike Ditka, Jim McMahon, and William "The Refrigerator" Perry all claim that they are "Diana Pearl". The ad then cuts to a Diana Pearl bathtub and reveals that Dennis Rodman is in the bathtub. Rodman closes the ad by stating that he too is "Diana Pearl".
Credit card	Mastercard "Icons"	Features classic advertising mascots eating dinner
Credit card	Visa "Superheroes"	Various Marvel Superheroes, including Spider-Man, Captain America, Thor, and Storm, come to help a woman who is calling for help; only to find out that her stolen Visa Check Card isn't liable for fraudulent charges.
Electronics	Olympus "Jacques Your Body"	Two teenage girls dressed for prom and a pair of football fans dance to Jacques Your Body by Les Rhythmes Digitales
Electronics	Olympus "m:robe Popin'"	An elderly couple and a boy who is blindfolded dance to Pure Gold by Offcuts
Film	Batman Begins	Movie promos
Film	Be Cool	Movie promos
Film	Constantine	Movie promos
Film	Hitch	Movie promos
Film	The Longest Yard	Movie promos
Film	The Pacifier	Movie promos
Film	Robots	Movie promos
Film	Sahara	Movie promos
Film	War of the Worlds	Movie promos
Food	Emerald Nuts "Unicorns"	Santa Claus, The Easter Bunny, and a Unicorn confront a Dad who won't share his Emerald Nuts with his daughter
Food	Lay's "Fence"	Thanks to throwing a bag of Lay's Potato Chips over a fence, a group of kids get their baseball back. After the kids successfully get their ball back, a dog, a 1972 Chevrolet Impala, and MC Hammer all are tossed over the fence as well. Director: Spike Lee
Food	Tabasco "Tan Lines"	Thanks to the Tabasco sauce used in her shrimp cocktail dip, a woman shown sunbathing at a beach has tan lines that are darker underneath. Soundtrack: Disco Inferno by The Trammps
Mail	FedEx "10 Things"	Determined to have the best Super Bowl commercial, FedEx researched past Super Bowl commercials and found 10 things that they believe will help them win, all of which are included in this ad: a celebrity (Burt Reynolds), an animal (a bear), a dancing animal (still the bear), a cute kid, a groin kick, a talking animal (still the bear), attractive females, a product message, a famous pop song ("Don't Stop Believin"), and a bonus ending.
Online Music	Napster "Do The Math"	At a football game, a costumed version of the Napster Cat holds up a sign comparing the cost of Napster to iTunes
Personal care	Degree "Mamma's Boy"	The ad promotes a spoof line of action figures called "In-Action Heroes". The ad which aired in the Super Bowl focus on the Mamma's Boy figure. Ads were also produced for the Suck Up and Wuss figures as well.
Restaurant	McDonald's "Lincoln Fry"	A Man finds a McDonald's French Fry that resembles Abraham Lincoln in his meal
Restaurant	Quiznos "By The Pool"	Baby Bob and an adult woman sit by a swimming pool to talk about the turkey sub from Quiznos
Restaurant	Subway "Parking Lot"	A pair of police officers' approach a parked car, with fogged up windows and "More Than Words Can Say" from Alias playing loudly, presuming to find a pair of lovebirds; turns out to be two guys eating hot fresh toasted sub sandwiches from Subway.
Restaurant	Taco Bell "Cards"	The ad promotes the Chicken Enchilada Grilled Stuffed Burrito. A bag of Taco Bell is placed on a table with a collection of rare baseball cards. This worries the owner of the cards, due to the contents of the burrito potentially smothering all over his collection, before being told that all of that is inside the burrito. The ad ends with the owner of the cards and his two friends then enjoy their burritos, only for one of them to spill their Pepsi on the card collection.
Retail	Staples "Easy Button"	People in difficult situations use the Staples "Easy Button" to resolve their issues
Sports	NFL "What's Next?"	Don Cheadle talks about what a moment means for the Super Bowl
Soft drink	Diet Pepsi "The Diet Pepsi Truck"	P. Diddy is late for an awards show, so he hitches a ride on a Diet Pepsi truck. After the arrival, everyone starts driving Diet Pepsi trucks, being the next big thing.
Soft drink	Diet Pepsi "Guy Watcher"	A man is shown walking on a street, drinking a Diet Pepsi, and everyone watching becomes attracted. Cast: Cindy Crawford, Carson Kressley Director: Joe Pytka Soundtrack: Stayin' Alive by The Bee Gees
Television network	NFL Network "Two-morrow"	It is similar to the 2004 ad, Various NFL personal who didn't make it to the Super Bowl sing Tomorrow from Annie. Cast: Daunte Culpepper, Jon Gruden, Chad Johnson, Byron Leftwich, Marvin Lewis, Curtis Martin, Steve McNair, Joe Montana, Ben Roethlisberger, Ephraim Salaam, and Roy Williams
Website	CareerBuilder "Apology"	A man tries to navigate through his office job, while all of his co-workers are monkeys
Website	CareerBuilder "Titanic"	In a company meeting, the man from the "Apology" spot tries to convince his monkey staff that naming a product "Titanic" is a bad idea.
Wireless	Verizon "Miniaturization"	The V-Cast from Verizon has inspired celebrities to shrink down to tiny size Cast: Christina Aguilera, Kid Rock, Shaquille O'Neal, and Deion Sanders

== 2006 (XL) ==
Product type	Product/title	Plot/notes
Film	16 Blocks	Movie promos
Film	Cars	Movie promos
Film	Mission: Impossible III	Movie promos
Film	Pirates of the Caribbean: Dead Man's Chest	Movie promos
Film	Poseidon	Movie promos
Film	Running Scared	Movie promos
Film	The Shaggy Dog	Movie promos
Film	V for Vendetta	Movie promos
Soft Drink	Diet Pepsi "Stunt Can"	A talent aged played by Jay Mohr accepts an offer from Jackie Chan to have a Diet Pepsi can co-star in a Kung-Fu movie with Chan. As part of the deal, the stunt double has to be a Diet Coke can.

== 2007 (XLI) ==
Product type	Product/title	Plot/notes
Beer	Bud Light "Reception"	An auctioneer is hired to officiate a wedding ceremony to make it go by faster so everyone can enjoy the Bud Light at the reception sooner.
Beer	Bud Light "Classroom"	Carlos Mencia teaches a class of foreigners how to ask for a Bud Light in different regions of the United States, and to say they don't speak English if they are ever asked for a Bud Light.
Beer	Bud Light "Hitchhiker"	A man and woman driving down a dark road encounter a hitchhiker with an axe and a case of Bud Light. The hitchhiker claims the axe is a bottle opener, and the man invites him in for a ride, to the woman's shock. Later, they encounter another hitchhiker with a case of Bud Light, except he also has a chainsaw.
Beer	Bud Light "Rock Paper Scissors"	Two men play rock paper scissors for the last bottle of Bud Light at a cookout. One of the men throws a rock at the other man's head, knocking him to the ground and allowing him to get the last bottle.
Beer	Bud Light "Fist Bump"	Fist bumps have fallen out of style and are replaced by slaps to the face
Beer	Bud Light "Great Apes"	One gorilla at a zoo tells a fellow gorilla about his plan to steal some Bud Light from a delivery man who passes by them every Friday, saying that he is the only one who can do it. However, he is distracted by a woman taking pictures of him and doesn't know what was said to him until the delivery man has just passed by them.
Beer	Budweiser Select "Just A Game"	Jay-Z and Don Shula face off in a game of holographic football
Car	Chevrolet "Ain't We Got Love"	Various people sing along to songs with Chevy references included in the lyrics. Cast: Big & Rich, Mary J. Blige, Dale Earnhardt Jr., Johnny O'Connell, T.I.
Car	Honda "Elvis	A Honda CR-V dances to a remixed version of Elvis Presley's Burning Love
Car	Honda "Slalom"	A group of Honda vehicles swerve through a line of gas pumps
Clothing	Izod "In the Snow"	At a snowy location, a couple partakes in 'warm' weather activities, such as golfing and kayaking. As they are enjoying themselves, the environment they are in, changes from cold and snowy to warm and tropical.
Clothing	Van Heusen "A Man's Walk"	The daily life of a man is shown in reverse
Computer	HP "Paul Teutul Sr."	Paul Teutul Sr. talks about his usage of HP Computers. Part of "The Computer Is Personal" campaign also starring Paul Teutul Jr. & Michael Teutul
Film	Meet the Robinsons	Movie promo
Film	Pirates of the Caribbean: At World's End	Movie promo
Film	Ratatouille	Movie promo
Film	Shrek the Third	Movie promo
Film	Spider-Man 3	Movie promo
Film	Transformers	Movie promo
Iced Tea	Snapple "Green Tea"	A man travels to Xi'an, China to learn what the EGCG in his Snapple Grean Tea means
Insurance	Nationwide "Rollin' VIP"	Kevin Federline appears in a music video rapping about living a high-flying lifestyle. The scene then cuts to him rapping into a security camera at a fast food restaurant, where his manager yells at him to get back to work.
Insurance	Prudential Financial "Rock"	A narrator describes all the different things a rock can do for someone
Pharmaceutical	Flomax "Biking"	Adult men are shown participating in activities such as biking and kayaking, while the voiceover explains to the viewer what Flomax is and does for its users.
Pharmaceutical	King Pharmaceutical "Heart Attack"	Addresses the risk of heart disease by showing a man dressed up in a heart costume, kidnapped and beat up by a villainous group that represents high blood pressure, diabetes, high cholesterol, and obesity.
Restaurant	Taco Bell "Big Game"	Two talking lions watch a group of humans have lunch from Taco Bell. This leads the two to debate on how to pronounce the 'r' in Carne Asada. Ricardo Montalbán is mentioned and provides the voice over at the end of the advertisement.
Soft drink	Coca-Cola "First Taste"	An elderly man has a Coke for the first time. That inspires him to try other new things like riding a sports bike and participating in the running of the bulls.
Soft drink	Sierra Mist "Karate"	Michael Ian Black teaches a karate class on how to prevent someone from taking their Sierra Mist. Also starring: Eliza Coupe, Guillermo Diaz, Jim Gaffigan, Nicole Randall Johnson, and Tracy Morgan
Technology	Garmin "Maposaurus"	Paying tribute to the Tokusatsu genera, a man opens up a car map that turns into a giant monster and begins wreaking havoc on a city. In response to this, another man steps out of his car, grabs his Garmin GPS, and becomes an Ultraman-inspired hero; who fights and defeats the evil monster. Featuring music by Steve Grimmett of Grim Reaper
Website	E*Trade "One Finger"	A voiceover lists all of the things a person can do with one finger.
Website	E*Trade "Robbery"	Bank tellers carry out a bank robbery
Wireless	Sprint "Connectile Dysfunction"	The ad is a parody of erectile dysfunction advertisements. Promotes Sprint Mobile Broadband
Gaming	Halo 3 "Starry Night"	

== 2008 (XLII) ==
Product type	Product/title	Plot/notes
Antihistamine	Claritin "180 MPH"	Carl Edwards promotes Claritin
Banking	Chase Bank "Secret Agent Man"	A commercial featuring the song "Secret Agent Man" by Johnny Rivers
Beer	Bud Light "Cavemen"	Three cavemen are trying to carry a cooler of Bud Light to a party. A friend says that he has invented the wheel. But the wheel is not working when they use it as hoister to carry the Bud Light. They later try to use a large rock to open a bottle, but end up smashing the bottle instead.
Beer	Bud Light "Breathe Fire"	A man gains the ability to breathe fire after drinking Bud Light, which he uses to light candles before eating a romantic dinner at his girlfriend's house. However, he is allergic to her cat and starts sneezing, shooting large flames out of his mouth and setting several things on fire in the process.
Beer	Bud Light "Ability to Fly"	A man gains the ability to fly after drinking Bud Light. He happily soars above the clouds, but is then sucked into the jet engine of a passing airplane.
Beer	Budweiser "Training"	For the Budweiser Clydesdales this year, Hank the Clydesdale is not picked. A dalmatian sees this and offers to train Hank for next year. In a tribute to Rocky, the two train like the training in the famous movie. The year after that, Hank becomes a Budweiser Clydesdale and gives a high five to his trainer.
Car	Audi "The Godfather"	Spoofing The Godfather, the horse's head is replaced with the front of a Rolls-Royce
Car	Toyota "Trike Race"	A neighborhood holds a race involving big wheel tricycles
Energy drink	Amp Energy "Jumpstart"	A tow truck driver attaches jumper cables to his nipples and dances to Push It from Salt-N-Pepa, in order to get a stranded motorist's vehicle to start again.
Film	The Chronicles of Narnia: Prince Caspian	Movie promos
Film	Iron Man	Movie promos
Film	Jumper	Movie promos
Film	Kung Fu Panda	Movie promos
Film	Wanted	Movie promos
Film	You Don't Mess with the Zohan	Movie promos
Soft drink	Coca-Cola "It's Mine"	At the Macy's Thanksgiving Day Parade, the Underdog and Stewie Griffin balloons chase after a Coke balloon, with New Yorkers watching from many places. But instead, Charlie Brown triumphantly catches the Coke.
Soft drink	Diet Pepsi Max "Nod"	Various people doze off while Haddaway's "What Is Love" plays in the background. Each individual, who dozed off, takes a sip of Diet Pepsi Max becomes energetic again and bobs their head in nod to the infamous scene from the 1998 film "A Night at the Roxbury". Cast: Troy Aikman, Joe Buck, LL Cool J, Missy Elliott, Macy Gray, Chris Kattan, Busta Rhymes
Soft drink	Pepsi "Magnetic Attraction"	Justin Timberlake gets dragged through a city, each time a girl takes a sip of her Pepsi. Also starring: Tony Romo & Andy Samberg
Soft drink	SoBe "Thriller"	Naomi Campbell and lizards do the famous Thriller dance
Sports drink	Gatorade G2 "Jeter"	Derek Jeter walks through a city, drinking a Gatorade G2. Each time he takes a step, the ground becomes a baseball field. Also starring: Archie Manning and Peyton Manning
Sports drink	Vitaminwater "Jockey"	Shaquille O'Neal becomes a jockey and wins a horse race
Website	E*Trade "Baby"	The E*Trade baby is born and he says that if he as a baby uses E*Trade, you can use it too.
Website	E*Trade "Clown"	The E*Trade Baby hires a clown with the money he saved using E*Trade

== 2009 (XLIII) ==
Product type	Product/title	Plot/notes
Beer	Bud Light "Conan"	Conan O'Brien says he will do an embarrassing Bud Light commercial, and he is promised it will only show in Sweden. He watches it in Times Square.
Beer	Bud Light "Drinkability"	Two guys are at a ski resort. One guy shows how some skiers have more drinkability than others by drawing a ramp and some trees. The second skier crashes into the trees.
Beer	Budweiser "Fetch"	A farmer plays fetch with his Dalmatian. A jealous Clydesdale goes and fetches a tree branch.
Beer	Budweiser "True Love"	A Clydesdale falls in love with a dancing circus horse. He searches for her, until they both escape together from the circus. A clown and an Indian man watch this, with the latter saying, "I didn't know Daisy was dating."
Beer	Miller Lite "High Life/1 Second Ad"	The Miller Lite guy screams "High Life". This commercial lasts exactly 1 second.
Car	Audi "The Chase"	Jason Statham is in a car chase, stealing different cars, ending up in different periods of time
Car	Hyundai Motor Company "Epic Lap"	A Hyundai Genesis Coupe, driven by Rhys Millen is shown powersliding around a racetrack
Film	G.I. Joe: The Rise of Cobra	Movie promos
Film	Land of the Lost	Movie promos
Film	Monsters vs. Aliens	3D movie promo
Film	Star Trek	Movie promo
Film	Transformers: Revenge of the Fallen	Movie promo
Film	Year One	Movie promo
Food	Doritos "Crystal Ball"	At the office, a worker ask if there will be free Doritos today. He then throws the crystal ball at a snack machine for Doritos, breaking the glass. An impressed worker asks if he will get a raise today, and throws the crystal ball at his boss in the groin. The first worker comes over, happily eating Doritos, and says, "Not in your future!" Directors: Joseph and Dave Herbert (who won $1,000,000 for the ad)
Food	Doritos "The Power of Crunch"	A man learns the power of crunch with a woman stripped down to her underwear, free money from an ATM, and a policeman being turned into a monkey.
Food	Ivar's "1/2 Second Commercial"	A seagull quickly says "Ivar's"
Manufacturing	Bridgestone "The Potato Heads"	Mr. Potato Head is being nagged by his wife while driving. As soon as they hit the brakes to avoid sheep, the car swerved, and Mrs. Potato Head's mouth flies off down a mountain. Mrs. Potato Head then sticks on her "angry eyes".
Manufacturing	GE "Scarecrow"	An animated scarecrow dances and sings "If I Only Had a Brain" from The Wizard of Oz on top of a power line.
Pet food	Pedigree "Get a Dog"	Instead of dogs, people try raising wild animals, such as ostriches and wild boars. Promotes the company's adoption drive.
Soft drink	Pepsi "Forever Young"	A look through two generations, all to the Bob Dylan song "Forever Young" and its cover by will.i.am.
Soft drink	Pepsi "I'm Good"	Many men drinking Pepsi Max get hurt, then say "I'm Good"
Soft drink	Pepsi "MacGruber"	MacGruber changes his name to PepSuber. Cast: Will Forte, Kristen Wiig, Richard Dean Anderson
Soft drink	SoBe "Lizard Lake"	The cast of Monsters Vs. Aliens, Matt Light, Ray Lewis, Justin Tuck, and the SoBe Lizards dance to a remix of Swan Lake. (Notable for being the first 3D Super Bowl commercial.)
Sports drink	Gatorade "Talking Heads"	Various athletes describe what "G" means to them. Cast: Usain Bolt, Jabbawockeez, Jimmie Johnson, Jackie Joyner-Kersee, John Maclean, Peyton Manning, Jason McElwain, Jessica Mendoza, Tiger Woods Director: Spike Lee
Restaurant	Denny's "Mafia"	Three mobsters are thinking about killing a guy, and they ask the waitress for more chocolate dumdiddles and swirly gumdrops on their pancakes. Part of the 'Serious Breakfast' campaign.
Restaurant	Denny's "Nannerpuss"	A dancing singing banana octopus
Website	Cash4Gold "One-Up"	Ed McMahon and MC Hammer trade in gold plated items for cash
Website	E*Trade "Singing Baby"	A web baby tries to express himself by singing
Website	E*Trade "Shankapotomus"	The E*Trade Baby goes golfing
