= List of Sons of Guns episodes =

The following is an episode list for the Discovery Channel reality television series Sons of Guns.

== Episodes ==
=== Reception ===
Episode premieres were watched by an average of 1.79 million people, making the show the third-ranked Wednesday night, non-sports, cable network series.

==== Season one (2011) ====
In season one, episode run lengths are 30 minutes.

No. overall	No. in season	Title	Original release date
1	1	"Civil War Cannon/Shotgun Silencer"	January 26, 2011
After seeing a suppressed shotgun in No Country For Old Men (film), a man comes into the shop and challenges Will to build it. A cannon collector brings in his $250,000 Civil War Confederate cannon, but Will wants it inspected before he and his team shoot it. With the initial design of a shotgun suppressor a failure, Will is forced to try again. During the firing of the cannon, Will gives shop apprentice Kris a "six-pack bonus" and lets him fire the first shot the cannon has seen in over 100 years.
2	2	"Master Key"	January 26, 2011
Will briefly talks about his employees. A local SWAT consultant, Marco, asks Will to design a gun which will cut down on the time needed between breaching a door and switching to a primary firearm. Will sets out accomplishing this with a combination shotgun-assault rifle. The team is worried about meeting deadlines with a malfunctioning mill. Will buys, to daughter Stephanie's displeasure and economic concern, a grenade launcher. Will attends a live fire test of his product, with excellent results. This weapon design is easily purchased from other weapon makers that have sold it for many years, Will states this in the episode. That is where the name came from "Master Key"
3	3	"Flamethrower"	February 2, 2011
After an encounter with a fellow veteran Woody Williams in a war museum, Will agrees to restore the fellow Marine's World War II flamethrower to working condition. It becomes clear to the shop that Will has a mysterious fear of using the weapon, however. Customers of the shop's store include a man looking to modify a purchased AK-47 to accept 30 round magazines, and a man who wanted to resell a fake M1 carbine. A husband comes in with his wife and works with Will to pick out a home defense weapon. After a friendly competition to determine who would use the flamethrower, the shop tests it out with a surprising conclusion.
4	4	"Browning Machine Gun/Stephanie's Big Bet"	February 2, 2011
Will spends an enormous amount of money to buy an M2 Browning ("Ma Deuce") machine gun kit, but it becomes clear he cannot put it together on his own. Stephanie works hard to sell enough guns through the store to compensate for Will's purchase, with the shop betting whether she can accomplish this feat. Stephanie lowers the price of a store weapon in exchange for a night fishing trip. The test firing of the Ma Deuce does not go without a few hiccups.
5	5	"Coffee Grinder/Katana"	February 9, 2011
Firearms instructor Tiger McKee commissions Red Jacket with building five copies of his prototype "Shootrite Katana" lightweight assault rifle. Shop gunsmith Vincent is assigned the job of assembly. Glen, Will's friend, finds a rare "coffee grinder" Civil War–era rifle, but its authenticity is questionable. Kris, the shop apprentice, makes a mistake in painting the Katanas. Finally, after a late night of final assembly by Vincent, the gun gets tested by Tiger with great results.
6	6	"AK-47 Silencer"	February 9, 2011
Will has a swivel gun delivered and has a mount manufactured by another shop. After demonstrating an external suppressor for a client (Joe), the client asks Will to produce an integral AK-47 suppressor. Will puts the final result through its paces, and the client is pleased with the results. After modifying the swivel gun's mount to suit his preferences, the team gives it a test fire on a lake.
7	7	"The Bazooka/Kris' Birthday"	February 16, 2011
Will briefly forgets about shop apprentice Kris' birthday, and has to decide on a gift to give him. Glenn, Will's friend, comes into the shop and asks Will to make reproduction World War II bazookas to be used in reenactments. Although Kris makes a minor mistake, fabrication goes smoothly. However, there is a problem with the accuracy of the rockets and gunsmith Joe is tasked with fixing it. The target on which the bazooka is tested is shocking to some, but testing goes smoothly and an immediate demand for the final product surfaces.
8	8	"Tommy Gun/Machete"	February 16, 2011
Shop employee Charlie works Will to build and sell a "Red Jacket" collectible samurai sword and machete combination blade. The local sheriff asks Will to modify a Thompson ("Tommy") sub-machine gun for use with his SWAT team. The shop sets to work on the sub-machine gun work which suffers from multiple initial firing troubles. Charlie's efforts at sword making become a complete failure, forcing Will to take control. Will demonstrates the final Tommy gun result for the sheriff and a pair of his deputies, leaving the clients happy.
9	9	"Movie Gun/Leopard Gun"	February 23, 2011
A movie producer visits the store and wants Will to convert a regular sub-machine gun into a gun that will only fire blanks. Although the money is good, time is short for the job. A counterfeit Red Jacket gun comes back into the store for warranty service. Stephanie asks the guys to surprise her dad with a double-barreled shotgun converted into a "leopard gun". Charlie is set to do the job, but it becomes clear he needs help. Will, Stephanie, and Kris visit the movie set to demo the blank-firing gun, but the result of the trip is more than one surprise, including a visit with actor Jeffrey Dean Morgan.
10	10	"Remote Controlled Machine Gun"	February 23, 2011
Red Jacket is tasked by an antique gun shop to restore and test a 19th century pistol. DB, a security contracting firm agent, asks Will to build a remote-control machine gun which can be mounted to a vehicle. Will consults with Louisiana State University for the stabilization system, but an argument arises over the remote control for using the gun. Meanwhile, a strange man comes into the store. The remote-controlled machine gun is put through its paces.
11	11	"ATV Gun/Help Wanted At Red Jacket"	March 2, 2011
A combat disabled Marine comes to Will and asks him to build a gun system which would allow him to hunt from an ATV with a shotgun using his single functional arm. Stephanie and Will work on finding some additional help in the shop, but Kris has a problem with one of the applicants. Will becomes angry with Vince when Vince believes their ATV-shotgun mounting system is flawed. A promising applicant (Glenn Flemming, AKA "Flemm") comes to interview and tryout for the open job and impresses Will straight away by bringing along a selection of his previous builds/projects including a fully rebuilt & restored WWII German MG42. Meanwhile the ATV gun is tested in the field by the client and the price is a surprise.
12	12	"Machine Gun Mania/The New Guy"	March 2, 2011
A police officer comes into the shop with a M1919 Browning machine gun and asks Will to convert it into a shoulder-fired weapon for a competition—in a few days. The crew sets about replacing and adding parts to make the 1919 shoulder mounted and lighter. The aftermarket parts they install have multiple issues requiring Vince to work through the night to meet the client's deadline. The demo becomes, according to Will, "a hoot". Flemm gets hired on with Red Jacket.
13	13	"The Rocket Launcher"	March 9, 2011
Security contractor Marco returns to Red Jacket and requests Will to design a non-lethal weapons system to deter sea-based pirate attacks. Based on a Katyusha rocket launcher design, Joe takes the lead designing the rockets and launching system. A customer comes into the shop with a 1910 Maxim machine gun, but the costs of repair are immense. Kris shows his brother around the shop. Testing of the rocket array goes off with a bang.
14	14	"Alligator Kill Stick"	March 16, 2011
A friend of Vince asks him to build a weapon which can kill an alligator humanely without damaging the valuable hide. Will tries to ease the workload on the shop by hiring mechanic Christopher/"Mikey" as well as asking Vince and Kris to help out on the phones. Flemm assists Charlie with testing some vintage weapons. Vince and Will go out to the field to test the alligator kill stick.
15	15	"Double M16"	March 23, 2011
An active duty navy gunner asks Will to tie two M16's together for better fire support ability. However, Will tasks Joe with designing a water cooling system when the gas tube/barrel turns bright red under sustained fire, causing premature primer detonation. Stephanie and a customer test out some shotguns.
16	16	"Flashlight Gun"	March 30, 2011
Will is inspired by Charlie's cool folding pellet gun to get the Red Jacket team to create a combination flashlight and survival kit that unfolds to become a semi-automatic M11 SBR rifle. Then, new guy Flem is tested when Will tasks him to build an MG 42 machine gun—aka "Hitler's Buzzsaw"—from a parts kit. As the build gets underway, Charlie's excitement causes him to prematurely advertise the product, much to Will and Stephanie's dismay; meanwhile, Vince is not too thrilled at having to build "MacGyver's Lunchbox".

==== Season two (2011–12) ====
Beginning with season two, episode run lengths are 60 minutes.

No. overall	No. in season	Title	Original release date
17	1	"Anniversary Bash"	July 13, 2011
With the 10 year anniversary of Red Jacket approaching, Will looks back on how far Red Jacket has come. To celebrate, Will decides to build a 3-in-1 M16 machine gun "triamese" as his Anniversary present; meanwhile Stephanie secretly organizes a surprise party; however, an error made by Kris is going to make it more difficult than expected as people begin showing up by the numbers before the celebration. An unexpected object falls out of an antique gun repair, which turns out to be a tooth. Will's surprise party goes off with a bang.
18	2	"AK Sniper Rifle"	July 20, 2011
Will decides to build a gun with the accuracy of a sniper rifle and the semi-automatic dependability of an AK-47 despite the doubts of Vince. World Champion archer, Chris Brackett, asks Will to make an arrow gun and exploding arrows. A customer has Red Jacket bring a WWII Arisaka rifle back to firing condition, at the same time Charlie is given the assignment to search for its ammo. The popularity of "Sons of Guns" takes its toll on Stephanie.
19	3	"American Chopper Gun"	July 27, 2011
This episode coincides with the second episode of the second season of American Chopper: Senior vs. Junior titled "Big Guns". Kris sketches up a crazy idea to create a chrome dipped 1919 into a chopper war machine - a gun styled to look like the handlebars of a motorcycle that might be made on American Chopper. Will then talks to Paul Teutul Jr. from Paul Jr. Designs and invites him (as well as Mikey) to come to the shop to test fire the new 1919 dragon gun. Stephanie is upset at the fact that she was not put in the loop in regards to the Teutuls visiting the shop. Vince requests help from Deep South Choppers and his tattoo artist to design aspects for the Dragon Gun. Once the painters complete the design, the team overlooks one minor detail which has Flem and the team scrambling to call back the painters. Meanwhile, world's fastest shooter, Jerry Miculek, stops into the shop and bets that he can shoot the Semi-Automatic, Silenced AK-47 faster than the factory full-auto version. Kris finally gets to use his "guitar gun" as a reward. Will and Vince head up to New York to see the PJD Team and give Mikey's birthday present from Paulie.
10	4	"The Meat Chopper"	August 10, 2011
Will tackles the ultimate challenge: taking four MG 42 machine guns and combining them into a German version of the classic WWII "Meat Chopper" anti-aircraft weapon, but the question is will the team succeed or has the team finally bitten off more than they can chew. Then, a customer brings in a rare antique French palm pistol that sparks a father-daughter debate about how to run the Red Jacket business. Joe and Charlie create some flying targets on the side for the "Meat Chopper", but Joe's flying skills are something to be desired. (Taken from Discovery.com)
21	5	"Grenade Launcher Silencer"	August 17, 2011
The Red Jacket crew tackles the nearly impossible - taking a fully automatic Mk 19 Grenade Launcher, and converting it into a silenced, single shot select fire weapon. Meanwhile, Kris takes it upon himself to make a hunting rifle float for a customer much to everyone's chagrin. Will, Joe, and Charlie play with the concept of a gunpowder version of a Soviet Ballistic Knife. Flem and Steph begin to go at it in regards to a paycheck and Will has to step in the middle. Later, Flem gets tagged by one of the shop machines, which causes him to black out. Steph starts stressing out as paperwork piles up in the office. With the Mk19 close to completion, the team overlooks one minor detail, which could prevent the team from making the deadline and Will prepares to lose it. (Taken from Discovery.com)
22	6	"Flying Guns and Uzis"	August 24, 2011
Will and the Red Jacket crew are now building death guns for helicopters! Red Jacket is building a complete operating Mag 58 weapons system with a unique twist -- a swivel arm. Will takes a stock Uzi and makes it competition ready in record time. Then, Stephanie goes on a wild ride. (Taken from Discovery.com)
23	7	"Taser Shotgun"	August 31, 2011
Will brainstorms combining a shotgun and a Taser for the police, but someone in the shop will need to be tased for the demonstration. The Red Jacket team revives a demilitarized WWII-era Lahti L-39 anti-tank gun to honor a veteran, while Will lays down the law for Kris who needs to back off on the front office flirting. (Taken from Discovery.com)
24	8	"The Gatling Gun/Dueling Pistols"	September 7, 2011
Will's motto "If you dream it, we can build it" is put to the test when a local scrap yard owner challenges him to build a modernized Gatling shotgun. The Red Jacket team repairs a set of antique dueling pistols, and Will is challenged to a duel. (Taken from Discovery.com)
25	9	"Oh My God, A Cannon!"	September 14, 2011
Things get crazy when Will tackles a WWII-era 57 mm Gun M1, a variant of the British Ordnance QF 6 pounder anti-tank gun. Meanwhile, Vince gives an AR-15 the Red Jacket treatment for Super Bowl champion and New Orleans Saints kicker Garrett Hartley. Then, things between Kris and Stephanie take an unexpected turn. (Taken from Discovery.com)
26	10	"Guns of Glory"	November 24, 2011
This was presented as a Thanksgiving Special Presentation following Pumpkin Chunkin 2011. This filming of this episode took place prior to the Season 2 Finale. The Red Jacket staff counts down their Top 10 Guns thus far, as well as reveal moments that occurred off camera: 1. GE Minigun - The team discusses the history of the weapon, as well as the Hollywood concept of a minigun backpack seen in various action films, specifically the scenes from Predator.; 2. Tommy Gun - The team discusses Vince's opposition to modernizing an "American Classic", Will's ""They will die!!!" quote during testing and how it has become a staple in promoting safety; as well as Kris' terrible James Cagney impersonation.; 3. Mag 58 - Will and Steph discuss their experience from shooting from the helicopter.; 4. Master Key - Vince discusses his shyness toward camera and his firsthand experience in Reality TV, as well as the overall construction of the build including moments that happened off camera and during testing. Right before introducing the master key, Vince can be seen lifting the propeller from the maxim test rig from season 3 off of Kris's bench.; 5. Meat Chopper - Flemm discusses almost losing his finger, as well as Charlie and Joe's issues with the remote control planes.; 6. .50 Caliber Machine Gun M2 "Ma Deuce" (and .50 Caliber Barrett) - Will discuss the difference between the two weapons, while Kris and Steph debate which of the two guns are better.; 7. Lahti - The team discuss the size and power of the weapon, while Vince mentions about the Smurf obsession during the build.; 8. Integrally Suppressed AK - The team discusses the impact of the weapon had in the business, as well as Kris' legendary water scene in the end credits of the episode... and the problems that occurred after filming.; 9. 1919 Machine Gun - The team recalls Mike Johnson, a police officer who wanted a shoulder fired 1919, as well as the visit from Paul Jr. Designs telling them to come back and visit.; 10. AK-47 - Will discusses the first firearm he built in his life, then leaves a final message to the fans that Red Jacket is just getting started.
27	11	"Will's Floating Fortress"	December 7, 2011
The Red Jacket crew creates a dual mounted M-240 Bravo machine gun and Mk 19 grenade launcher for the local sheriff's Gulf Patrol Boat. Will restores a WWII German Luger P08 after he's inspired by the gun's great battlefield capture story. And Kris finally steels himself to respond to Will's ultimatum - does he choose Steph or Red Jacket?
28	12	"Honey, I Blew Up the USS Kidd"	December 14, 2011
Will and the Red Jacket crew restore a 20 mm Oerlikon cannon and twin 40 mm Bofors anti-aircraft guns aboard the World War II destroyer USS Kidd (DD-661) for an explosive Fourth of July air show. Meanwhile, Steph and Charlie designs a line of ladies Saiga 5.45 rifles — with fashionable custom paint jobs — much to Will's chagrin, as well as becoming a distraction to the team. The question is then brought up...what is the origin of the Red Jacket name?
29	13	"Flamethrower Cannon"	December 21, 2011
Will and the RJ crew are challenged to build a double-barreled, napalm spewing, flamethrower cannon, much to Will's chagrin again after having to deal with Woody William's flamethrower restoration in the past. Meanwhile, against Will's wishes, Steph enlists Kris to help her design Derringer holsters for women. Also, Vince and Charlie rebuilds a German Mauser K98 rifle that has original capture papers provided by their resident gun historian Glenn Harrison. Problems occur during reveal day, but Will once again has to face his fears in front of his team and his clientele.
30	14	"Boys and Their Maxim Toys"	December 28, 2011
After a previous disappointment, the RJ crew finally get the chance to restore a WWI Maxim machine gun, mount it to a plane engine and create an interrupter system allowing the gun to fire cleanly between moving propeller blades. What the team doesn't realize that the client is Will himself. Also, Vince and Steph team up to modify a Glock with special charging handles to help a customer with multiple sclerosis safely fire again. Vince ends up having to deal with too many things at home that it is hindering his work load; it further becomes a pain with the team looking over his back. Meanwhile, the team tries to deal with the propeller engine ending with some unexpected results. Flem once again tries to find out the meaning behind the Red Jacket name, without success - until Will decides to tell everyone the story.
31	15	"Hogzilla Gun"	January 4, 2012
Will and the RJ crew create a muscled up, silenced, night stalking AR to take down the wild hogs that are tearing up Louisiana farm land. Also, Charlie scores big when he finds a rare, pinfire ammo for a 150-year-old, $7500, 20-round Lefaucheux Pistol. Vince has been lagging on work lately, so Kris attempts to cheer him up...by challenging him in a quick draw duel. Suddenly, a high profile assignment is given to Red Jacket and after much deliberation, Will decides that Kris should take lead, much to Vince's dismay due to Kris' lack of experience.
32	16	"Mortars and Mayhem"	January 11, 2012
Will and the RJ crew resurrect an 82mm Russian mortar (possibly an 82-PM-41). When the shop's truck needs repair, the mechanic shows interest with the team's mortar project and will swap his services for a working mortar. Vince discusses with Kris about his inexperience in project builds. Tempers flare when Kris has trouble building the new Desert AR. Vince is reluctant to help Kris with the AR. Ted Nugent stops by and gets to fire a belt-fed machine gun. Will gets a call that the Desert AR is needed sooner than planned.
33	17	"Wedlock and Load"	January 18, 2012
In this explosive season finale, Will, Steph and Kris head to Vegas to demo the Red Jacket Desert AR - an American gun built to challenge the AK during extreme desert warfare. Then, everyone is stunned when Red Jacket loses a valued member.

==== Season three (2012) ====
Season three premiered February 29, 2012.

No. overall	No. in season	Title	Original release date
34	1	"This Time It's Personal"	February 29, 2012
Joe witnesses a murder while in New Orleans; Will and his crew transform a Ferret Scout into a riot control vehicle for the New Orleans Police Department. Will tries his best to make a bid for two revolvers only to get "sniped" by the "King of Guns". With the workload building up, Steph decides to step in and help out the guys. Meanwhile, Flem gets an unexpected phone call. As final preparations are made for the Ferret, Joe notices something different about Kris, it comes out that Kris and Stephanie are married.
35	2	"Sniper Rifle Silencer"	March 7, 2012
Jon Weiler of Professional Marksmen Inc. commissions the Red Jacket crew to integrally suppress a .50 caliber rifle and they only have less than a week to do it. Will, Joe, and Kris work through the night to come up with a plan. Record holder, Tom Knapp, makes a request for a spread shot that exceeds a 10 gauge; Charlie recommends going several centuries backwards with a blunderbuss, and much to his dismay, inadvertently takes lead for the project; things only get harder when the "King of Guns" strikes again. Reign Clark of customblunderbuss.com produces an 85% blunderbuss build that Will finishes himself. At Will's request, Rifle Dynamics sends one of their own to assist Red Jacket, but receives a mixed response from the team.
36	3	"Kamikaze Cannon"	March 14, 2012
Joe resigns from his teaching position; while Will turns down a job for a Japanese Zero Type 99 20mm Auto Cannon. Taking a huge risk, Joe takes the job behind Will's back and on the sneak. To help with the build, Flem request assistance from Vince, who has since quit Red Jacket. Kris inadvertently comes across the secret project and wants in; however, is caught between the promise he made to Joe and the commitment he made to Will. Meanwhile, Chris Ledford, whose identity is revealed as "The King of Guns", is asked by Will to search for a Nambu pistol and magazines in a short period of time for a friend. Will catches wind of Joe's recklessness and tries various ways to stop him.
N–A	N–A	"Behind the Scenes"	March 21, 2012
37	4	"Jesse James Gun"	March 28, 2012
Monster Garage's Jesse James visits Red Jacket and commissions a custom made Browning Automatic Rifle. However, Jesse made contact with Vince, prior to leaving; Will has no choice but bring Vince back to Red Jacket as an outside contractor. However, it doesn't sit well with Kris with Vince coming back to Red Jacket.
38	5	"World's Largest Machine Gun"	April 4, 2012
Red Jacket takes in a 40mm Bofors from Ira but the manual is in Finnish, so Will decides to call back Vince to help. Chris Ledford visits Joe Perry to pick up a pistol owned by Elvis Presley while the team restores a Volcanic Repeating Pistol for Spencer Hoglund. Meanwhile Will's having trouble with the 40mm Bofors and time is running out before the deadline.
39	6	"Armored and Dangerous"	April 11, 2012
An armored Porsche is fitted with M-16s and Claymore mines. Also, Steph builds a custom rifle behind Will's back.
40	7	"Zombie Gun"	April 18, 2012
Kris convinces Max Brooks, author of The Zombie Survival Guide and World War Z, to come to the shop and the group create the perfect "tactical" military grade and "practical" personal civilian firearm to fight a zombie horde. Will allows Steph to get her hands dirty on a Lewis Machine Gun. Will and Vince finally part ways.
41	8	"Total Recall Vector Submachine Gun"	July 25, 2012
Kris asks will if they can commission a weapon similar to the new Total Recall film with Will approving on if Kris takes responsibility for everything. After getting permission from Sony, as well as Special FX artist, Patrick Tatopoulos, Kris receives props as well as other items relating to the film. Will is inspired by Kris and calls up a friend to give Kris some "secret agent" training; meanwhile, Stephanie gets some stunt training of her own from members of the Total Recall stunt team.
42	9	"The Gun That Killed Osama"	September 12, 2012
An HK416 assault rifle is modified; the gun thought to have been used to kill Osama bin Laden is recreated.
43	10	"Three Cannons and a Rock Star"	September 19, 2012
The crew refurbish a black-powder Lyle cannon for guitarist Joe Perry; a WWII German Pak 36 and an American 37-mm M3 cannon are repaired and engage in a Axis vs Allies competition on the Red Jacket range to determine the better weapon system.
44	11	"Red Jacket Snow Blaster"	September 26, 2012
A 57-mm recoilless rifle is built for a mountain-rescue team to clear avalanche zones in the Pacific Northwest.
45	12	"Red Jacket Challenges MythBusters"	October 3, 2012
Will, who is a MythBusters fan, feels that Red Jacket can revisit and confirm the myth from Casino Royale that someone can blow up a propane tank with a single gunshot - which the Build Team busted on the MythBusters James Bond Special. He devises a multi-projectile "Super Beehive" round that still requires only one pull of the trigger and invites Kari Byron and Tory Belleci to Red Jacket to try some weapons and revisit the myth with their help. However, after much testing, the myth remains busted - but in return, Kari issues a challenge to Will and invites Red Jacket to MythBusters headquarters at M5 in San Francisco.
46	13	"Shotgun SuperStars vs. Redjacket"	October 10, 2012
Benelli challenge Red Jacket to make a prototype for the "ultimate performance Benelli M4 12-gauge shotgun". Will decides to build a 2nd version while Joe heads up the main build. Gun1: Ambidextrous charging handle, "XRail" magazine extension system, adjustable butt-stop, front pistol grip, accessory & optics tri-rail system. Gun2: Fully automatic conversion with select fire switch, custom "MoJo" muzzle brake.
47	14	"Nine Guns and a Shootout"	October 17, 2012
Three-gun competition sets are created for 2 VIP's within the firearms industry. Kris is inspired and works the team solidly to also create a set for Will causing them to almost miss the deadline. Once finished, the 3 Father and Son teams tackle a 3 gun competition course created by Charlie.
48	15	"Free Fall Shotgun"	October 24, 2012
A close-quarters shotgun designed to be perfect for parachuting into battle is built for a special-services contractor. Will has to face and take on one of his biggest fears.

==== Season four (2013) ====
Season four premiered April 19, 2013 and ended on June 7.

No. overall	No. in season	Title	Original release date
49	1	"Under Siege"	April 19, 2013
Hurricane Isaac is just around the corner, but the real storm is coming. First off, the team sees something special coming up, a M36 Tank Destroyer needing to shoot; meanwhile, another client is need of a repair for a British PIAT. As Isaac gets closer, Will appoints shop minion, Thomas, to guard the shop while the storm hits. Later that night, he gets spooked by Flemm, who was lurking outside. As Tom checks outside, he finds a blacklisted individual at the front, Vince, who is now running a new shop down the street, Mesa Kinetic. With the help of Heavy Weapons specialist, Ira Sellers, the team finds the missing piece for the M26, the problem is that it isn't an exact part meaning the several millimeters could be the difference between the tank function or blowing up; as for the PIAT, one test causes one member of the team to draw blood. Will notices 10 socoms rifles missing barrels, upon realizing the order for the SOCOMs were mishandled, Will becomes enraged at Kris and leaves the shop. After several successful test with the M36, Will decides to go in the tank and shoot; however, once inside, the team sees smoke coming out of the tank causing everyone to run towards the tank.
50	2	"Hangfire"	April 26, 2013
After the scare involving the M36 Tank Destroyer, Will gets a call from a two star general wanting him to travel to Jordan leaving Stephanie and Kris running the shop. With the issue of the SOCOM orders, as well as other clientele, Red Jacket has too much on their plate to the point that one customer decides to choose another gun shop, Mesa Kinetic. Stephanie is unfamiliar with the shop name until she learns from Tom and Flemm that that shop is run by former RJ employee, Vince Buckles, much to Stephanie and Kris' dismay. Red Jacket then gets a visit from specialist Ira Sellers, who is looking for parts for his Solothurn Anti Tank Rifle. Despite Stephanie's objections, Kris' takes the job for Ira, only being given a week to work on it. During the test, the team realizes that a new firing pin is needed for the Solothurn; while Stephanie tries everything to get it, Flemm makes one phone call to an old friend, Vince. With the help of Vince, Flemm manages to get a firing pin for the Solothurn. When Stephanie spots Vince in front of Red Jacket, she questions Flemm's loyalty to the shop. Will and Joe return from Jordan only to learn that the SOCOM issue hasn't been resolved; however, the team is going out to test Ira's Solothurn. After returning from the Solothurn demo, Stephanie tells Will that Vince is back in town and he has his own shop.
51	3	"Will's Monster"	May 3, 2013
With their SOCOM order still short 10 barrels. Will is met by a big shipment of 870s, that Joe have purchased for R&D. The goal being a "house model" 870. Will sees the war room in disarray, and tells Kris to organize it. Kris recruits the team to clean up the war room. A friend of Flem, Justin comes by to see if he'll be able to buy the parts they cleaned out of the war room, he offers scrap price for it. Will offers to make him a functioning weapon out of the random parts. Flem visits Vince at his new shop, where he discovers Vince has a box of SOCOM barrels. Will starts working on his Frankengun. The team gets assigned a shotgun each to make a "prototype" RJF 870. Steph's still looking for SOCOM barrels. Will continues work on his Frankengun. Kris, Flem, Charlie and Joe starts on their 870's, Steph sneak off with one too. Will asks Joe for help with his Frankengun. The Red Jacket team presents their 870's to Will for test firing. Will liked Joe's shotgun best. Flem catches Will outside smoking, and proceeds to tell him about Vince's stash of SOCOM barrels. Will rides to Vince's shop where they negotiate price, and Vince extends a "special" Red Jacket only offer. Words are exchanged and Will leaves. Will goes back to the shop to blow off some steam by completing the build on his Frankengun. The team sees Will's "monster" complete, and then goes to test fire it. While preparing to leave Kris and Will bumps into Chris Ledford, who immediately shows an interest in the weapon. They bring Chris with them to the client reveal. After a Red Jacket "spring cleaning" reveal, Chris and Justin bid on the gun.
52	4	"Russian Roulette"	May 10, 2013
An MK-7 is modified; an anti-tank cannon is restored; and tempers flare between Joe and Kris.
53	5	"Cutbacks"	May 17, 2013
The crew build an MG-34 machine gun.
54	6	"One Man Army"	May 24, 2013
In an exciting challenge the crew modifies a PKM from a three-man to a one-man combat unit. Will restores a Lefever rifle destroyed in a tornado. Kris makes a deal hoping he'll save Red Jacket but when Will gets bad news, he's ready to close RJF forever.
55	7	"Misfire"	May 31, 2013
Will has a heart-to-heart with Flem; Tom's behavior puts his job in jeopardy.
56	8	"Last Round"	June 7, 2013
Will builds a sniper rifle in the Season 4 finale.

==== Season five (2014) ====
Season five premiered March 21 and ended on May 16, 2014.

No. overall	No. in season	Title	Original release date
57	1	"Will Power"	March 21, 2014
Joe experiments with a remote-controlled flying machine in the Season 5 premiere. Later, Will receives bad news.
58	2	"Mobile MAG-58"	March 28, 2014
A snowmobile is fitted with machine guns; Charlie works on a rare Chinese rifle.
59	3	"Steel Tornado"	April 4, 2014
Will is commissioned to make a triple-barrel shotgun.
60	4	"Scorpion Strikes"	April 11, 2014
Will works on a British Scorpion tank from the 1970s
61	5	"Master Blaster"	April 18, 2014
Will attaches a Mac-11 machine pistol to a Saiga-12 shotgun; Kris snaps at Joe.
62	6	"The Throwdown"	April 25, 2014
Mounting a long-range rifle to a vehicle; Will wants to debut a prototype, but Joe thinks using a different model makes more sense.
63	7	"Bone-dry .50 Cal"	May 2, 2014
A 50-cal. machine gun is rebuilt; Will gives Joe an ultimatum.
64	8	"Red Jacket Reloaded"	May 9, 2014
Will accepts Joe's proposal and RJF gets a new shop. Kris gets injured; Will works on a 152-mm artillery gun.
65	9	"Red Jacket Rises"	May 16, 2014
A Hispano-Suiza is mounted on a motorcycle sidecar with the help of an unlikely source, Vince. Joe accepts a project to revive a WWII weapon, a Bigot Dart Gun.
