= Teutul =

Teutul is a surname. Notable people with the surname include:

- Paul Teutul Sr. (born 1949), founder of Orange County Choppers (OCC)
  - Paul Teutul Jr. (born 1974), his elder son and co-founder of OCC
  - Michael Teutul (born 1978), his youngest son
