= Bar None =

Bar None may refer to:

- Bar None, a discontinued chocolate bar formerly distributed by The Hershey Company
- "Bar None" (song), by Jordan Davis
- BarNone, a company that connects consumers seeking auto loans with car dealerships
- Bar None (nightclub), a chain of bar/nightclubs that originated from New York City
- Bar/None Records, an independent record label based in New Jersey.
- Bar None Dude Ranch, the fictional setting for the Nickelodeon series Hey Dude
- William Floyd, former NFL player, nicknamed Bar None
