= Paul Teutul =

Paul Teutul is the name of:

- Paul Teutul Sr. (born 1949), American motorcycle designer and builder
- Paul Teutul Jr. (born 1974), American reality television personality, son of Paul Teutul Sr.
