= PJD =

PJD can have several meanings

- the custom motorcycle manufacturer Paul Jr. Designs
- the American computer scientist Peter J. Denning
- the Justice and Development Party (Morocco)
