= Virtual Bartender =

Viral marketing campaign

Virtual Bartender (virtualbartender.beer.com) was a viral marketing campaign launched in 2004 by beer.com, which featured an online interactive "virtual bartender", played by Playboy model Tammy Plante. When a request, such as "pour me a beer," "dance on the bar" or "fight like a Jedi", was recognized the "virtual bartender" carried out the task before returning to her idling position to await another request. There were over 120 different actions and thousands of different words and phrases that produced a response. The company claimed that the site received over 10 million visits and 200 million page views in its first month of release.

In the spring of 2005, the campaign released a second Virtual Bartender game, featuring two models instead of one.

== History ==
The site was launched on Thursday 4 November 2004 (between 9:00 p.m. and Midnight Eastern Standard Time). Ten emails were sent out to friends of beer.com from their office to beta test “Virtual Bartender”. No other form of marketing was used and there were not any links from the home page or any other sites. No search engine marketing, banner ads or offline media were used to promote the campaign.

- November 5, 2004: More than 15,000 sessions. The first “Fan Forum” appeared from the UK where young DJs talked about the commands they discovered.
- November 6: Sessions began doubling - 30,000. More “Fan Forums” appeared around the world (Holland, Italy, Japan, USA)
- November 10: Over 500,000 sessions. Still going viral - The only way to get the Virtual bartender was through forwarded emails and the increasing number of 'Fan Forums' appearing in search engines. At that point, the average length of visit was 7 minutes and page views reached 7,980,000.
- By day 28 the site had reached 10 million sessions. It continued to receive hundreds of thousands of visitors each week.

Virtual Bartender won 'Best Interactive Viral' at the 2004 Viral Awards. The creative director of the campaign was Rick Brown.

By 2008, the site was no longer active.

== Beer.com ==
The url "beer.com" was bought in 1998 for $80,000 by domain speculators Andrew Miller and Michael "Zappy" Zapolin, operating as the "Internet Real Estate Group". They reportedly "built an audience for the site by giving out free e-mail addresses and having fans rate different brews," but the real pay day came when they sold it for $7 million to mega-brewer Interbrew less than a year later.

The "Beer.com" which came up with the Virtual Bartender then came online (in 1999), with Interbrew executive Rocco Rossi named president, and was touted as an online community directed to males age 18-34.

== See also ==
- The Subservient Chicken
