= Epidemic Marketing =

Dot-com company (1999–2000)

Epidemic Marketing was a short-lived dot-com company headquartered in Denver, Colorado that operated in the viral marketing sector. Before it closed its doors in June 2000, it employed approximately 60 people. Its website was located at www.epidemic.com.

== Operation ==
Epidemic attempted to generate marketing revenue by paying customers to attach links to internet businesses in their outgoing mail. Presumably, after seeing their websites jump in popularity, clients would pay Epidemic a greater amount than was paid to customers.

Although Epidemic considered its efforts as viral marketing, it operated in a very similar fashion to spam and bot nets, albeit with willing end-users who were receiving paid compensation.

== History ==
The company was launched in September 1999. It raised $7.6 million in venture capital in its first round of financing.

The company spent $1.6 million to secure a 30-second ad during Super Bowl XXXIV. According to national account manager James Wallen, the ad drew "little response from consumers but helped to attract important business partners."

Business plans apparently failed and the company attempted to merge with a California-based firm. When this failed, the company shuttered in June 2000.

== Unrelated SEO company ==
As of April 2018, there exists an unrelated Denver-based search engine optimization company also named Epidemic Marketing.

== See also ==
- Computer.com
- Dot-com commercials during Super Bowl XXXIV
- Dot-com bubble
