= Azeroth Choppers =

- Created by: Blizzard Entertainment
- Starring: Paul Teutul, Jr. Chris Metzen; Samwise Didier
- Country of origin: United States
- Original language: English

Original release
- Release: 17 April – 5 June 2014

Azeroth Choppers was a weekly web series by Blizzard Entertainment that ran from April 17 to June 5, 2014. It featured Paul Teutul, Jr. (American Chopper) and his company Paul Jr. Designs building motorcycles based on Blizzard's long-running MMORPG World of Warcraft.

Two teams of builders chosen by Paul Jr., advised by members of Blizzard's development team, designed and built custom motorcycles that reflected the two factions of World of Warcraft, the Alliance and the Horde. Chris Metzen, Blizzard's Senior Vice President for Creative Development, headed "Team Alliance", and Samwise Didier, Blizzard's senior art director, headed "Team Horde". On May 29, voting opened to choose the winning design, which will be adapted as an in-game mount for World of Warcraft, and players of the winning faction will receive the bike for free. In an interview at PAX East in Boston on April 12, Paul Jr. revealed that Blizzard gave him total control over the design, pointing out the rarity of a large company like Blizzard allowing such freedom: "When it comes right down to it, for them to let that go and let me take control and trust me, it's unheard of; nobody does that."

The votes were tallied on June 5, 2014, with the Horde bike being chosen as the winning design. The bike was mailed to all Horde players who logged in between July 24 and September 30 upon the release of World of Warcraft: Warlords of Draenor in November 2014. The Alliance bike was made available in December 2014 for in-game gold.
