= Sons of Guns =

- Starring: Will Hayden; Stephanie Hayden; Kris Ford; Joe Meaux; Charlie Watson; Glenn Fleming; Vince Buckles
- Country of origin: United States
- Original language: English
- No. of seasons: 5
- No. of episodes: 65 (list of episodes)

Production
- Executive producer: Stephen Land
- Producer: Dane Walker Chase
- Production location: Baton Rouge, Louisiana
- Running time: 30 minutes with commercials (season 1); 60 minutes with commercials (season 2–5)
- Production company: Jupiter Entertainment

Original release
- Network: Discovery Channel
- Release: January 26, 2011 – May 16, 2014

Sons of Guns is a reality television series that aired on the Discovery Channel between 2011 and 2014. The series centers on Red Jacket Firearms LLC, a Louisiana-based business that manufactures and sells custom firearms to law enforcement, security firms, and private collectors. Will Hayden was the founder and owner of the shop, while his daughter and business partner Stephanie managed the office.

As on the Discovery Channel series MythBusters, this show practices a degree of self-censorship and safety-consciousness. Each episode begins with a staff member (usually Will) warning viewers not to try anything demonstrated on the show at home. In addition, during scenes of catastrophic failure, the crew reminds the audience not to try anything at home. The program made a noted point to avoid showing specific detail of how weapon modifications or fabrications are performed.

After five seasons, the show was cancelled on August 27, 2014, as a direct result of Hayden's arrest on various sexual charges. On April 7, 2017, Hayden was convicted on two counts of aggravated rape and one count of forcible rape. On May 11, 2017, Hayden was sentenced to two life sentences plus 40 years in prison to be served consecutively, for rape of two girls between ages of 11 and 13. On July 12, 2017, he pleaded no contest to two separate rape charges and was given a third life sentence plus 40 years.

== Cast ==
- Will Hayden – owner
- Stephanie Hayden – co-owner (Will's daughter)
- Kris Ford – shop manager
- Joe Meaux – Chief operating officer
- Charlie Watson – forensic firearms expert/marketing manager

In addition to their listed roles, all staff members also work as gunsmiths.

=== Recurring clients and experts ===
- Glenn Harrison – antiques collector/history enthusiast
- Barry Borum - gun manufacturer (also assists the crew in some builds as an outside contractor)
- David P. Michaels - flamethrower expert
- Ira Sellers - big-bore rifles, heavy-weapons expert
- Jim Fuller - rifle dynamics
- Billy Cho - rifle dynamics
- Chris Ledford - alias the "King of Guns"
- Natalie Foster - girl's guide to guns

=== Former staff ===
- Vince Buckles - former shop manager/head gunsmith, he resigned at the end of season two, and briefly returned as an outside contractor for part of season three. As of season four, Vince is still featured on the show, as he has opened his own gun shop (Mesa Kinetic Research) near Red Jacket.
- Glenn "Flem" Fleming – former shop welder, he departed to open Acadiana Gunworks near Lafayette, Louisiana, and his own YouTube channel - The Gunners Vault. Flem and his team still appear, but as outside contractors.

=== Crew ===
- Stephen Land (executive producer)
- Patrick Leigh-Bell (co-executive producer)
- Stephanie Buxbaum (co-executive producer)
- Dolores Gavin (executive producer for Discovery Channel)
- Zac McFarlane (director/cinematography)
- David Vanacore (music)
- Eric Johannsen (editor)
- Todd Beabout (editor)
- Edward Klau (editor)
- Mike Le (editor)

== Other appearances ==
- The staff of Red Jacket also made an appearance in the second episode of the second season of American Chopper: Senior vs. Junior, asking Paul Jr. Designs to help them with a dragon-themed machine-gun design.
- Will Hayden and Rich Wyatt (of American Guns) hosted the Discovery Channel special Top 10 Shootouts in which they discussed and demonstrated firearms used in events of American history. Will Hayden also made an appearance in another Discovery Channel documentary, How We Invented: Guns, which aired following the season-four finale.

== Production ==
Sons of Guns first aired on the Discovery Channel on January 26, 2011, with the pilot episode “Civil War Cannon, Shotgun Silencer.”

== Legal issues ==
Bureau of Alcohol, Tobacco and Firearms settlement

According to TMZ.com, during a routine inspection by the Bureau of Alcohol, Tobacco, and Firearms (BATF) in 2009, Red Jacket could not account for 10 registered firearm parts. In a settlement, William Hayden and Stephanie Hayden surrendered their gun-making licenses and were allowed to choose a licensed individual to control Red Jacket. Initially, that person was Vincent Buckles, but Buckles has left the company, subsequently two other individuals controlled the company.

In a WBRZ article, Attorney Craig Davidson, Jr., said that 10 guns did not go missing from the shop. Instead, one or two guns were stolen during 2001–2008. Davidson claimed the rest of the missing guns were receivers that were thrown away or destroyed when gunsmiths made mistakes. Although Davidson characterized the lost weapons as "simple bookkeeping errors", the BATF requires serial-numbered parts to be tracked. Will and Stephanie Hayden did not keep track, so, according to Davidson, Hayden and the ATF mutually agreed to shut down Red Jacket, Inc.

Davidson further stated that at that time, Hayden was already in discussions with the Discovery Channel about the show, and had plans to start another business, Red Jacket Firearms, LLC. Will Hayden is not an officer of Red Jacket Firearms, LLC. When Davidson was asked why Hayden was not an officer, Davidson stated the reason was a "confidential business decision".

Dallas-Fort Worth airport incident

In September 2011, Jupiter Entertainment, the Sons of Guns production company, made the evening news when its staff member, on the 10th anniversary of the September 11 attacks, parked a rental truck, containing automatic weapons and pyrotechnics, outside the Dallas/Fort Worth International Airport, while waiting for a colleague. Part of Terminal B was closed for several hours while the FBI investigated, but found no wrongdoing. An executive of the production company said he regretted the incident, and blamed it on "a simple yet colossal error in judgement by a member of our staff."

Rape, abuse, and assault arrests

On August 27, 2014, the series was abruptly cancelled after child endangerment, child rape, and abuse charges were brought against Will Hayden. "Given the serious and horrific nature of the charges against Will Hayden, we have decided to halt further production of Sons of Guns and cancel the series," a Discovery Channel rep told TMZ. After the announcement, all presences of the series, including episode availability through cable providers, Netflix, and on Discovery's website, were completely removed worldwide. In September, Hayden's eldest daughter, business partner, and Sons of Guns co-star, Stephanie Hayden, changed her claims from that of defending her father to accusing him of also raping and abusing her as a child.

Since the cancellation of the show, Kris Ford was arrested on child abuse charges and for assault on a minor. Stephanie Hayden-Ford, who is the mother of the child from a previous relationship, was also arrested for assault charges on October 17, 2014. Bail was set at $25,000 each according to WWL.

=== Juvenile rape conviction ===
On August 11, 2014, Hayden was arrested and charged with molestation of a juvenile and aggravated crimes against nature. He was subsequently charged with rape of a child based on the statements of the victim.

The charges led to the cancellation of Sons of Guns. Hayden was additionally accused of aggravated rape by his oldest daughter. She told police that she was raped 22 times before she was 12 by her father, Hayden. She came forward after the allegations were made against Hayden. As a result of this last charge, his bail was raised from $200,000 to $350,000. In January 2015, he pleaded not guilty. In August 2015, the judge relieved Hayden's three private lawyers from the case per the lawyers' requests. The lawyers said that confidential conditions for their representation had not been met, but that "no bitterness" existed between Hayden and them. Hayden was represented by a public defender at a later court date.

On April 7, 2017, Hayden was convicted of two counts of aggravated rape and one count of forcible rape, of two girls over the course of two decades. On May 11, 2017, Hayden received two life sentences (mandatory for aggravated rape), to run concurrently, plus 40 years, to run consecutively, in prison. He is not eligible for any parole, probation, or suspension of sentence, and will spend the rest of his life in custody.

On July 12, 2017, Hayden pled no contest to two separate rape charges filed against him in Livingston Parish, Louisiana and received a third life sentence plus 10 years, to run concurrently with his previous sentences. He was subsequently transferred to the Louisiana State Penitentiary in Angola.
