= Computer.com =

Dot-com company (1999–2000)

- Founded: 1999
- Defunct: 2000
- Website: computer.com at the Wayback Machine (archived 2000-08-15)

Computer.com, Inc. was a short-lived dot-com company founded in 1999. After spending half of its $7 million in venture capital on ads during Super Bowl XXXIV, it was sold to Office Depot in 2000. It is significant as a case study for business historians and others interested in the dot-com bubble.

== History ==
Prior to 1999, the domain computer.com was owned by Gary Kremen, who sold it for $500,000. In 1999, Mike Ford and Mike "Zappy" Zapolin founded Computer.com as a general-purpose website to teach people about various aspects of computing. After raising $7 million in venture capital, (Note: CNet.com gives the company's initial capital as $5.8 million.) Computer.com partnered with an advertising agency to create three Super Bowl advertisements six weeks before the game started. Initially, they were dismayed, as due to their late entry, their time slot was located at the end of the game, at the two-minute warning. However, thanks to the closely contested game, the advertisement became one of the highest-rated of all time.

After Super Bowl XXXIV, the company secured "an additional $2 million in a second round of funding." In late 2000, the company was sold to Office Depot.

== Operation ==
It is unclear whether Computer.com ever turned a profit or delivered any kind of actual service to consumers. Viewers visiting the site in response to the Super Bowl commercial would have found only a small dictionary of terms such as "MP3" and links to buy basic home computer products from other companies, mostly outpost.com. Computer.com became a notorious example of the extreme of the "dot-com bubble," in that it appeared to have gone through its entire lifecycle, including the $7 million Super Bowl ad, without ever articulating what it offered as a company or making a sale of any kind.

== Domain usage ==
Prior to March 30, 2024 the domain was being used as a front end for a supposedly modified version of ChatGPT similar to Bing Chat.

As of March 30, 2024, the domain is currently being used as a cloud AI infrastructure platform.

== See also ==
- Dot-com commercials during Super Bowl XXXIV
- List of commercials during Super Bowl XXXIV
- Dot-com bubble
