= Will Hayden =

American gunsmith

- Born: June 24, 1965 (age 61); Baton Rouge, Louisiana, U.S.
- Convictions: Aggravated rape, forcible rape
- Penalty: Three life sentences without the possibility of parole + 40 years

Details
- Date: 1991–1992, 2013–2014
- Imprisoned at: Louisiana State Penitentiary
- Military career
- Branch: United States Marine Corps
- Service years: c. 1983 – c. 1989
- Rank: Sergeant

William Michale Hayden (born June 24, 1965) is an American gunsmith, television personality, former U.S. Marine, former gun shop owner, and convicted child sex offender. He is known as the star of the 2011–2014 Discovery Channel reality series Sons of Guns. He was convicted of sex crimes in April and July 2017, receiving three life sentences, and is currently serving those sentences at the Louisiana State Penitentiary.

== Early life ==
Hayden was born in Baton Rouge, Louisiana. From an early age, he was a firearms enthusiast, and often read about weapons and warfare.

Hayden survived a large house fire as a "three or four year old" child. He stated in a 2011 interview that he remembers, "waking up to fire 'eating me up'... burning the bed... the sheets... the room". Hayden also stated that he was abused by his father in a piece titled Sons of Guns: Straight-Shootin' Stories from the Star of the Hit Discovery Series. He says in the article, "Hell, he put me through a wall with a punch when I was five... From that moment on I realized I had to pick my battles carefully. Very carefully. Any battle I could get up and walk away from was a victory. It didn't matter if me or my psyche looked or felt like it'd been run through a meat grinder. Victory is victory."

By age 12, he began building firearms. When he turned 18, he enlisted in the Marines, serving for six years and achieving the rank of sergeant.

== Career ==
After returning home from the service, Hayden started his own construction and refrigeration business, while working on guns on the side.

=== Red Jacket Firearms ===
His side business began to take off, and in 1999, he sold his main business and officially opened Red Jacket Firearms. The firm's first commercial order was from a large distributor called Manotick Firearms for twenty rifles.

From 2011 until 2014, Hayden received nationwide fame when Sons of Guns - a reality TV program focusing on the specialized firearm builds at Red Jacket - aired on Discovery Channel. On August 26, 2014, it was announced that Red Jacket Firearms had received a legal separation as an entity from Hayden.

== Personal life ==
He resided in the Greenwell Springs area of Central, Louisiana.

Hayden's daughter Stephanie and former son-in-law Kris Ford also appeared on the show as well as working at Red Jacket.

=== Juvenile rape conviction ===
On August 11, 2014, Hayden was arrested and charged with molestation of a juvenile and aggravated crimes against nature. Hayden claimed that the allegations were false and made in retaliation by a vengeful ex-girlfriend, the 12-year-old girl's mother. He was subsequently charged with rape of a child based on the statements of the victim.

The charges led to the cancellation of Sons of Guns. Hayden was additionally accused of aggravated rape by his oldest daughter. She told police that she was raped 22 years before when she was 12 by her father, Hayden. She came forward after the allegations were made against Hayden. As a result of this last charge, his bail was raised from $200,000 to $350,000. In January 2015, he pleaded not guilty. In August 2015, the judge relieved Hayden's three private lawyers from the case per the lawyers' request. The lawyers said that confidential conditions for their representation had not been met, but that there was "no bitterness" between them and Hayden. Hayden was represented by a public defender at a later court date.

On April 7, 2017, Hayden was convicted of two counts of aggravated rape and one count of forcible rape, of two girls over the course of two decades. On May 11, 2017, Hayden was sentenced to two life sentences (mandatory for aggravated rape), to run concurrently, plus 40 years, to run consecutively, in prison. He is not eligible for any parole, probation, or suspension of sentence, and will spend the rest of his life in custody.

On July 12, 2017, after pleading no contest to the charges facing him, Hayden was sentenced by Livingston Parish Judge Robert Morrison to a third life sentence for rape. Morrison ordered that the new sentence shall run concurrently with Hayden's previously ordered sentences. Hayden has now been sentenced to three life sentences plus 40 years and was transferred to Louisiana State Penitentiary.
