= BarNone =

Former lead generation company

BarNone (1-800-BarNone)
- Industry: Lead Generation
- Founded: 1995; 31 years ago
- Defunct: 2019; 7 years ago
- Headquarters: Oakland, California, U.S.
- Parent: Centrro, Inc.
- Website: www.barnone.com

BarNone (1-800-BarNone) was a lead generation company based in Oakland, California, USA. BarNone was founded in 1995, and was later purchased by the First Advantage Corporation in 2005 for their Dealer Services segment. They were later sold to Centrro, Inc. in August 2009.

BarNone connected consumers seeking an auto loan with auto dealerships. Consumers were targeted through direct mail, television ads, and internet marketing. BarNone targeted consumers who typically have bad credit that needed help with an auto loan.

In 2002, BarNone Inc. acquired rights to "adopt" the former Pets.com sock puppet, portrayed by Michael Ian Black, in their advertisements, replacing Fran Tarkenton. BarNone's slogan was "Everyone Deserves A Second Chance."
