= Pets.com =

Former American online retailer

- Type: Public
- Traded as: Nasdaq: IPET
- Founded: November 1998; 28 years ago
- Defunct: November 9, 2000; 26 years ago
- Fate: Self-liquidated
- Headquarters: San Francisco, California, United States
- Number of employees: 320
- Website: www.pets.com at the Wayback Machine (archived March 1, 2000)

Pets.com was an American dot-com enterprise headquartered in San Francisco, California, that sold pet supplies to retail customers. The website was launched in November 1998 and was shut down in November 2000. A high-profile marketing campaign gave it a widely recognized public presence, including an appearance in the 1999 Macy's Thanksgiving Day Parade and an advertisement in the 2000 Super Bowl. Its popular sock puppet advertising mascot was interviewed by People magazine and appeared on Good Morning America.

Although sales rose dramatically due to the attention, the company failed to become profitable and became known as one of the biggest faces of the dot-com crash in 2000. Since 2001, the Pets.com domain has redirected to PetSmart's website.

== History ==
On November 21, 1994, the Pets.com domain name was registered by Pasadena-based entrepreneur Greg McLemore. The Pets.com website launched in early November 1998 as a spinoff of WebMagic and Pets.com was incorporated in February 1999. After its start by Greg McLemore and Eva Woodsmall, Pets.com was purchased in early 1999 by Julie Wainwright. Amazon.com was involved in Pets.com's first round of venture funding, purchasing a majority 54% stake in the company. Amazon, along with Hummer Winblad Venture Partners and Bowman Capital Management invested $10.5 million into Pets.com in March 1999. The CEO of Pets.com, Julie Wainwright, said of Amazon's investment, "This is a marriage made in heaven." By October 2000, Amazon had a 30% stake in the company. Pets.com spent most of the venture funding on large warehouses and other shipment infrastructures, as well as purchasing their biggest online competitor at the time, Petstore.com in June 2000 for $10.6 million.

A regional advertising campaign using a variety of media began, which included television, radio, print, outdoor advertising and a Pets.com magazine, which had its first issue published in November 1999. The first issue was sent to 1 million pet owners in the United States during the month it was first published. Pets.com started with a five-city advertising campaign, which was expanded to 10 cities by Christmas 1999. The company succeeded in making its mascot, the Pets.com sock puppet, well known. The Pets.com site design was extremely well-received, garnering several advertising awards. In January 2000, the company aired its first national commercial as a Super Bowl ad which cost the company $1.2 million. That ad was ranked #5 by USA Today's Ad Meter. The company went public on the NASDAQ stock exchange in February 2000 and raised $82.5 million; the former Nasdaq stock symbol was IPET.

Despite its success in building brand recognition, it was uncertain whether a substantial market niche existed for Pets.com. No independent market research preceded the launch of Pets.com. During its first fiscal year (February to September 1999), Pets.com earned $619,000 in revenue, and spent $11.8 million on advertising. Pets.com lacked a workable business plan and lost money on nearly every sale because, even before the cost of advertising, it was selling merchandise for approximately one-third the price it paid to obtain the products. Pets.com tried to build a customer base by offering discounts and free shipping, but it was impossible to turn a profit while absorbing the costs of shipping for heavy bags of cat litter and cans of pet food within a business field whose conventional profit margins are only two to four percent. The company hoped to shift customers into higher-margin purchases, but customer purchasing patterns failed to change and during its second fiscal year the company continued to sell merchandise for approximately 27% less than cost, so the dramatic rise in sales during Pets.com's second fiscal year only hastened the firm's demise.

In September 2000, Pets.com opened a new customer service call center in Greenwood, Indiana and relocated the majority of its customer work force to Indiana in order to cut costs. They aggressively undertook actions to sell the company. PetSmart offered less than the net cash value of the company, and Pets.com's board turned down that offer. The company announced on November 7, 2000 that they would cease taking orders on November 9, 2000 at 11am PST and laid off 255 of their 320 employees. Pets.com had around 570,000 customers before its shutdown. Pets.com stock had fallen from its IPO price of $11 per share in February 2000 to $0.19 the day of its liquidation announcement. At its peak, the company had 320 employees, of which 250 were employed in the warehouses across the United States. While the offer from PetSmart was declined, some assets of Pets.com, including its domains, trademarks and subsidiaries such as Flying Fish Express, were sold to PetSmart in December 2000. As of 2026, the Pets.com domain redirects to PetSmart.com.

Wainwright and nine other executives stayed during the liquidation and held a stockholders' meeting on January 16, 2001 to finalize the liquidation. Wainwright received $235,000 in severance on top of a $225,000 "retention payment" while overseeing the closure. The company changed its name to IPET Holdings, Inc. on January 16, 2001 and liquidation of the company was completed on January 18.

=== Charity work ===
During the company's existence, Pets.com partnered with Best Friends Animal Sanctuary to start a charity called "Pets.commitment", which provided funding and support for animal shelters, animal therapy, service dog programs, pet care and wellness organizations. The charity's motto was "people helping animals, animals helping people." After the Pets.com website closed in November 2000, Pets.com donated more than 21 tons of dog food to help Mushers in Alaska's Interior in December 2000.

== Sock puppet ==
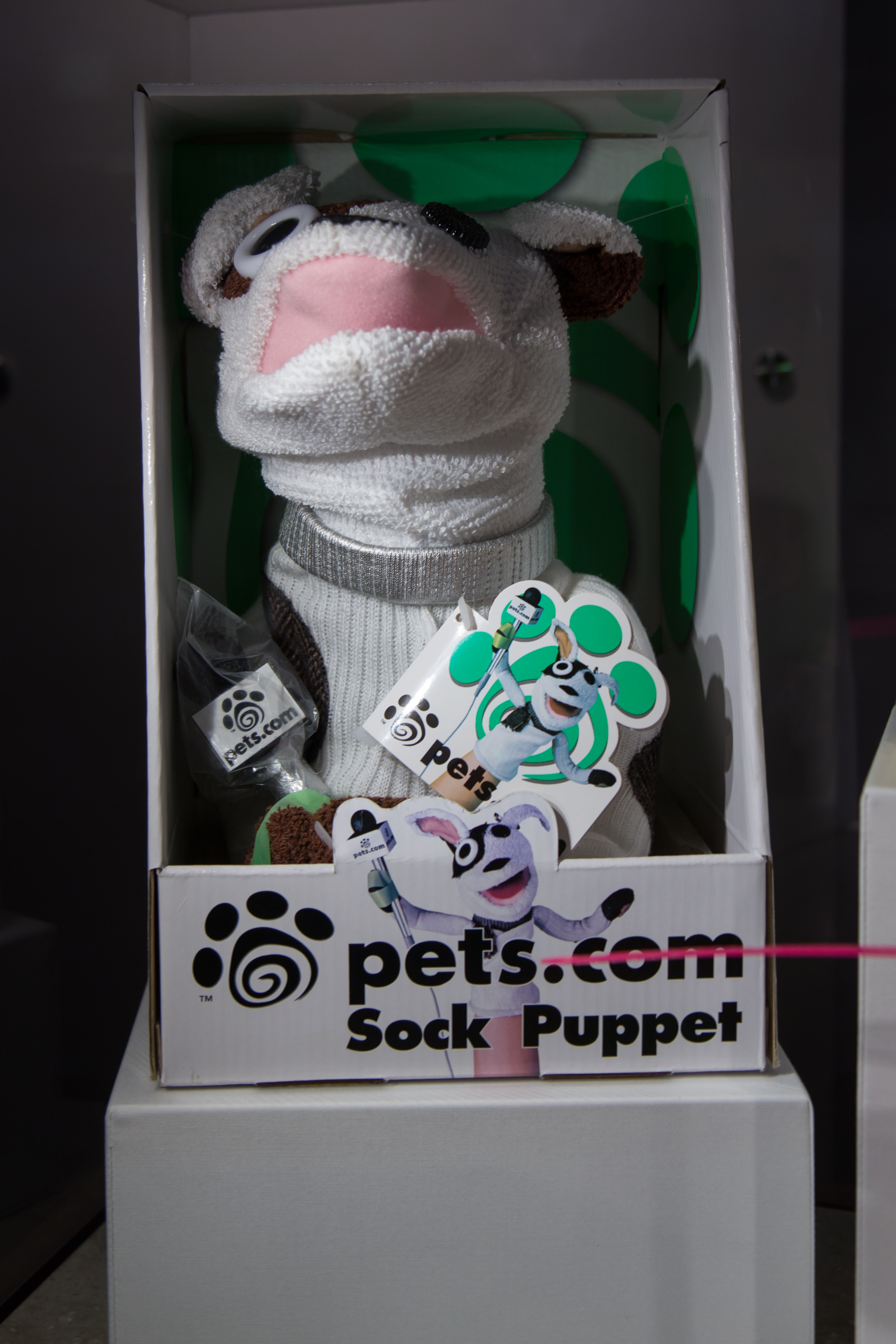
The Pets.com sock puppet toy

Pets.com hired the San Francisco office of TBWA\Chiat\Day to design its advertising campaign. The firm had recently created the popular Taco Bell chihuahua. For Pets.com, it designed a doglike sock puppet that carried a microphone in its paw. The puppet, performed by Michael Ian Black (an alumnus of MTV's surrealist comedy sketch show The State), was a simple sock puppet with button eyes, flailing arms, a watch for a collar, and a stick microphone emblazoned with "pets.com". The sock puppet first appeared in Pets.com's advertising in August 1999.

As the puppet's fame grew through 1999 and 2000, it gained almost cult status and widespread popularity. The puppet made an appearance on ABC's Good Morning America and Nightline, WABC-TV-produced Live with Regis and Kathie Lee, was interviewed in People Magazine, Time Magazine, Entertainment Weekly and Adweek and even had a 36-foot-tall (11 m) "falloon" made in its image for the 1999 Macy's Thanksgiving Day Parade. In addition to the media appearances the Pets.com puppet made, merchandising was also done for the company including clothing, other trinkets, and a retail version of the sock puppet that delivered some of the puppet's famous lines, which started shipping on June 13, 2000. More than 10,000 puppets had been sold in its first week of availability and more than 35,000 puppets had been sold by late-July 2000. The Pets.com sock puppet toy was available until the website's shutdown. The Pets.com sock puppet also had an "autobiography" of himself titled "Me by Me", which was released in 2000, a coffee table book featuring a compilation of photos with quotes.

After Pets.com liquidated, Hakan and Associates and Bar None, Inc. purchased the rights to the puppet under a joint venture called Sock Puppet LLC for $125,000 in 2002. Bar None, Inc., an American automotive loan firm, gave the puppet a new slogan: "Everyone deserves a second chance." and aired nine commercials featuring the puppet in July 2002.

=== Lawsuit ===
As Pets.com's recognition began to grow, it attracted the attention of the creators of Triumph the Insult Comic Dog. Representatives from Robert Smigel sent letters, including a cease and desist demand, to Pets.com claiming that the puppet was based on Triumph. Pets.com responded by suing Smigel in the U.S. District Court in San Francisco in April 2000, demanding $20 million in damages for defamation and trade libel.

Wainwright responded to the lawsuit, saying that "We were surprised when we received the letter because there is obviously no relation between the Pets.com Sock Puppet and Triumph".

The lawsuit was dismissed in February 2001 by Judge Charles R. Breyer.

== Legacy ==
The publicity surrounding the Pets.com puppet, combined with the company's collapse, made it a symbol of dot-com folly. During Super Bowl XXXV, in 2001, E-Trade ran a commercial that parodied the "crying Indian" public service advertisement from 1971 and the dot-com commercials during the previous Super Bowl, showing a ruined, dot-com-themed landscape, including a discarded sock puppet. In June 2008, CNET named Pets.com as one of the greatest dot-com disasters.

Pets.com's concept was successfully realized by Chewy.com, prompting comparison between the two companies by analysts after Chewy held their IPO in 2019. Chewy's founder Ryan Cohen rejects comparisons to Pets.com, telling Yahoo in 2019, "That is an absolute crazy comparison. I think there's really nothing in common between those two businesses."
