= Dot-com commercials during Super Bowl XXXIV =

Super Bowl advertisements in 2000

Super Bowl XXXIV (played in January 2000) featured 14 advertisements from 14 different dot-com companies, each of which paid an average of $2.2 million per spot. (Note: Though Britannica.com, E*Trade, Electronic Data Systems, Kforce, and MicroStrategy are all companies that ran ads with a .com address, they have not been included in this list because the founding date of these companies exclude them from the strict definition of a dot-com company. Sources do not agree on the exact amount of dot-com advertisers who bought spots.) In addition, five companies that were founded before the dot-com bubble also ran tech-related ads, and 2 before game ads, for a total of 21 different dot-com ads. These ads amounted to nearly 20% of the 61 spots available, and $44 million in advertising. In addition to ads which ran during the game, several companies also purchased pre-game ads, most of which are lesser known. All of the publicly held companies which advertised saw their stocks slump after the game as the dot-com bubble began to rapidly deflate.

The sheer amount of dot-com-related ads was so unusual that Super Bowl XXXIV has been widely referred to as the "Dot-Com Super Bowl"; it is often used as a high-water mark for the dot-com bubble. As of 2016, of these companies, four were still active, five were bought by other companies, and the remaining five were defunct or of unknown status.

== Effectiveness ==
Many websites saw short-term gains from the advertisements. LastMinuteTravel.com, for example, reported a surge of 300,000 hits per minute during its advertisement broadcast. In many cases, though, this did not translate into long-term gains. OurBeginning.com's revenue jumped 350% in Q1 of 2000, but its $5 million in advertising costs were still ten times what its customers spent. Short-term gains were not enough to recoup advertising losses, and Pets.com, Computer.com, and Epidemic.com, among many others, would fold before the end of the year.

== Later references ==
Less than a year later, E*Trade ran an ad during Super Bowl XXXV mocking the glut of dot-com commercials during the previous game. The ad featured the chimpanzee from E*Trade's 2000 commercial wandering through a ghost town filled with the remains of fictional dot-com companies, including a direct reference to the already-defunct Pets.com's sock puppet. During the game that year, only three dot-com companies ran advertisements.

The dot-com commercials that aired during Super Bowl XXXIV received renewed attention in 2022 following Super Bowl LVI, which featured a large number of cryptocurrency-related ads. Critics drew comparisons between the rise of cryptocurrency and its commercials to the 2000 game's ads and the ensuing dot-com bubble burst, and nicknamed the 2022 game the "Crypto Bowl". Following a similar crash in cryptocurrencies, as well as major cryptocurrency exchange FTX filing for bankruptcy in November 2022, it and multiple other cryptocurrency-related companies that had bought ad space for the following Super Bowl (Super Bowl LVII) pulled out, resulting in no cryptocurrency-related ads airing that year.

== In-game ads ==
The following list details each company, the commercials they ran, and their ultimate fate. All spots were 30 seconds long.

Company	Commercial Title(s)	Company Status
AutoTrader.com	"I Need a Car"	Active
Computer.com	"Mike and Mike"	Purchased by Office Depot in 2000
e1040.com	"Charity"	Defunct; parent company Gilman Ciocia merged with National Holdings Corporation in 2013
Epidemic.com	"Bathroom"	Defunct in 2000
E-Stamp.com	"Time Saving Tips"	Defunct; domain name redirects to Stamps.com
HotJobs.com	"Negotiations"	Bought by Yahoo! in 2002, later purchased and liquidated by Monster.com in 2010
LastMinuteTravel.com	"Tornado"	Active; merged with Tourico Holidays in 2004, which itself was acquired by Hotelbeds Group in 2017
LifeMinders.com	"The Worst Commercial"	Purchased by Cross Media Group in 2001
Monster.com	"The Road Less Travelled"	Active; acquired by Randstad NV in 2016
OnMoney.com	"Paper Monster"	Defunct in 2002
Netpliance	"Webhead"	Rebranded as TippingPoint in 2002, purchased by 3Com in 2005
OurBeginning.com	"Invites"	Purchased by an undisclosed company in 2002
Pets.com	"If You Leave Me Now"	Defunct in 2000, Liquidated in 2001; redirects to PetSmart's website
WebMD	"Ali"	Active; acquired by Internet Brands in 2017

=== Companies founded before the bubble ===
In addition to the companies listed above, several tech companies that were founded before the dot-com boom also ran ads. As these are outside the strict definition of a dot-com company, since their founding significantly pre-dated the creation of a dot-com website, they have been listed separately.

Company	Commercial Title(s)	Spot Length	Company Status
Britannica			Active (online only; print edition ceased publication in 2010)
E*Trade	"Wasted 2 Million", "Out the Wazoo", "Basketball Prodigy"	0:30 each	Active (acquired by Morgan Stanley in 2020)
Electronic Data Systems	"Cat herders"		Purchased by HP in 2008
Kforce			Active
MicroStrategy	"Fraud", "Stock Alert"	0:30 each	Active

== Pre-game ads ==
The following list details companies which ran ads prior to the actual game time.

Company	Commercial Title(s)	Spot Length	Company Status
Computer.com	"Untitled 1", "Untitled 2"	0:30 each	Purchased by Office Depot in 2000
OurBeginning.com	"Untitled 1", "Untitled 2", "Untitled 3"	0:30 each	Purchased by an undisclosed company in 2002

== See also ==
- Dot-com bubble
- List of Super Bowl commercials § 2000 (XXXIV)
- Cryptocurrency bubble
