= Mike "Zappy" Zapolin =

American entrepreneur

- Occupation: Entrepreneur
- Known for: Domain Name Pioneer
- Website: zappy.com

Mike "Zappy" Zapolin is an American entrepreneur who is considered a pioneer in the domain name industry. He has created Internet brands that have included Music.com, Beer.com, Computer.com, Creditcards.com, Diamond.com and PrescriptionDrugs.com. He is a public speaker and also the creator of the eBusiness elective offered at Harvard Business School. Zapolin is currently the CEO of Zappy Incorporated, a cannabis development company.

Zapolin was in direct marketing before purchasing domain names as an investment. He worked in infomercials and was even interviewed by Katie Couric on The Today Show. Zapolin began purchasing domain names in popular categories such as Beer.com – which he purchased for $80,000 – later selling it for $7 million. He also purchased Diamond.com for $300,000 and later sold it for $7.5 million. Both sales are listed among the top prices paid for domain names. During this time he was one of three people running the domain name investment company Internet Real Estate Group.

Zapolin is also a filmmaker. He directed the documentary film, The Reality of Truth, with Deepak Chopra and Michelle Rodriguez.

Zappy was the winner of the Amsterdam Film Festival's Van Gogh award for Documentary Directing, now having over 1.5 million views on YouTube and being available on Amazon Prime and Gaia.

Mike Zapolin also is co-founder of Documercial Group, a multimedia company that captures process and protocols in photos and video for different products and services brands to create content for causes and projects that help to make a more conscious world.

== Psychedelic advocacy ==
In the 2020s, Zapolin became known for work as a "psychedelic concierge", advising clients about psychedelic-assisted experiences and connecting them with clinics, doctors and other practitioners.

His work has included psychedelic retreats involving executives and other public figures. His work with psychedelic experiences and business leaders was profiled by Forbes in 2024.

Zapolin is a co-founder of Psychedelic Concierge, an educational platform providing training related to psychedelic preparation, facilitation and integration.

== See also ==
- List of most expensive domain names
