= Dot-com bubble =

Tech stock speculative craze, c. 1995–2003

The NASDAQ Composite index spiked in 2000 and then fell sharply as a result of the dot-com bubble.

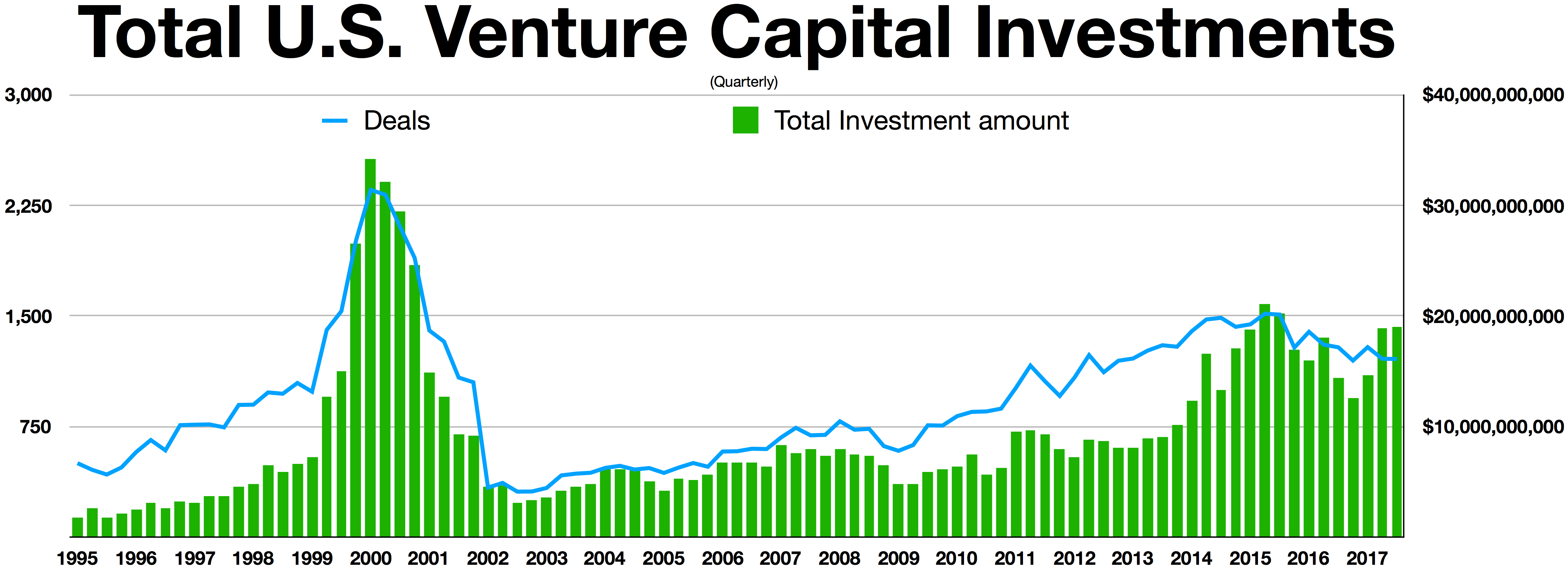
Quarterly U.S. venture capital investments, 1995–2017

The dot-com bubble (or dot-com boom) was a stock market bubble that developed during the late 1990s and peaked on March 10, 2000. This period of market growth coincided with the widespread adoption of the World Wide Web and the Internet, resulting in a dispensation of available venture capital and the rapid growth of valuations in new dot-com startups. Between 1995 and its peak in March 2000, investments in the Nasdaq Composite stock market index rose by 600%, only to fall 78% from its peak by October 2002, giving up all its gains during the bubble.

During the dot-com crash, many online shopping companies like Pets.com, Webvan, and Boo.com, as well as several communication companies, such as WorldCom, NorthPoint Communications, and Global Crossing, failed and shut down; WorldCom was renamed to MCI Inc. in 2003 and was acquired by Verizon in 2006. Others, like Lastminute.com, MP3.com and PeopleSound were bought out. Larger companies like Amazon and Cisco Systems lost large portions of their market capitalization, with the latter losing 80% of its stock value.

== Dot-com company ==
A dot-com company, or simply a dot-com (alternatively rendered dot.com, dot com, dotcom or .com), is a company that conducts most of its business on the Internet, usually through a website on the World Wide Web that uses the popular top-level domain (TLD) ".com". As of 2021, .com is by far the most used top-level domain, with almost half of all registrations.

The suffix .com in a URL usually (but not always) refers to a commercial or for-profit entity, as opposed to a non-commercial entity or non-profit organization, which usually use .org. The name for the domain came from the word commercial, as that is the main intended use. Since the .com companies are web-based, often their products or services are delivered via web-based mechanisms, even when physical products are involved. On the other hand, some .com companies do not offer any physical products.

=== Origin of the .com domain (1985–1991) ===
The .com top-level domain (TLD) was one of the first seven created when the Internet was first implemented in 1985; the others were .mil, .gov, .edu, .net, .int, and .org. The United States Department of Defense originally controlled the domain, but control was later transferred to the National Science Foundation as it was mainly used for non-defense-related purposes.

== Background ==
Historically, the dot-com boom can be seen as similar to a number of other technology-inspired booms of the past, including railroads in the 1840s, automobiles in the 1900s, radio in the 1920s, television in the 1940s, transistor electronics in the 1950s, computer time-sharing in the 1960s, and home computers and biotechnology in the 1980s.

== Prelude to the bubble ==
With the creation of the World Wide Web in 1991, many companies began creating websites to sell their products. The 1993 release of Mosaic and subsequent web browsers during the following years gave computer users access to the World Wide Web, popularizing the use of the Internet. In 1994, the first secure online credit card transaction was made using the NetMarket platform. By 1995, over 40 million people were using the Internet. That same year, companies including Amazon.com and eBay were launched, paving the way for future e-commerce companies. At the time of Amazon's IPO in 1997, they were recording a 900% increase in revenue over the previous year. By 1998, with a valuation of over $14 billion, they were still not making a profit. The same phenomenon occurred with many other internet companies—venture capitalists were eager to invest, even when the companies in question were not profitable. In late 1999, the Nasdaq index reached a price-to-earnings ratio of over 200, more than double that of the Japanese asset price bubble at the beginning of the 1990s.

Internet use increased as a result of the reduction of the "digital divide" and advances in connectivity, uses of the Internet, and computer education. Between 1990 and 1997, the percentage of households in the United States owning computers increased from 15% to 35% as computer ownership progressed from a luxury to a necessity. This marked the shift to the Information Age, an economy based on information technology, and many new startups were founded as a result of that growth.

At the same time, a decline in interest rates increased the availability of capital. The Taxpayer Relief Act of 1997, which lowered the top marginal capital gains tax in the United States, also made people more willing to make more speculative investments. Alan Greenspan, then-Chair of the Federal Reserve, allegedly fueled investments in the stock market by putting a positive spin on stock valuations. The Telecommunications Act of 1996 was expected to result in many new technologies from which many people wanted to profit.

== The bubble ==
As a result of these factors, many investors were eager to invest, at any valuation, in any dot-com company, especially if it had one of the Internet-related prefixes or a ".com" suffix in its name. Venture capital was easy to raise. Investment banks, which profited significantly from initial public offerings (IPO) (almost all of them were on Nasdaq), fueled speculation and encouraged investment in technology. A combination of rapidly increasing stock prices in the quaternary sector of the economy and confidence that the companies would turn future profits created an environment in which many investors were willing to overlook traditional metrics, such as the price–earnings ratio, and base confidence on technological advancements, leading to a stock market bubble. Between 1995 and 2000, the Nasdaq Composite stock market index rose 400%. It reached a price–earnings ratio of 200, dwarfing the peak price–earnings ratio of 80 for the Japanese Nikkei 225 during the Japanese asset price bubble of 1991. In 1999, shares of Qualcomm rose in value by 2,619%, 12 other large-cap stocks each rose over 1,000% in value, and seven additional large-cap stocks each rose over 900% in value. Even though the Nasdaq Composite rose 85.6% and the S&P 500 rose 19.5% in 1999, more stocks fell in value than rose in value as investors sold stocks in slower growing companies to invest in Internet stocks.

An unprecedented amount of personal investing occurred during the boom and stories of people quitting their jobs to trade on the financial market were common. The news media took advantage of the public's desire to invest in the stock market; an article in The Wall Street Journal suggested that investors "re-think" the "quaint idea" of profits, and CNBC reported on the stock market with the same level of suspense as many networks provided to the broadcasting of sports events.

At the height of the boom, it was possible for a promising dot-com company to become a public company via an IPO and raise a substantial amount of money even if it had never made a profit—or, in some cases, realized any material revenue or even made a finished product. People who received employee stock options became instant paper millionaires when their companies executed IPOs; however, most employees were barred from selling shares immediately due to lock-up periods. The most successful entrepreneurs, such as Mark Cuban, sold their shares or entered into hedges to protect their gains. Sir John Templeton successfully shorted many dot-com stocks at the peak of the bubble during what he called "temporary insanity" and a "once-in-a-lifetime opportunity". He shorted stocks just before the expiration of lockup periods ending six months after initial public offerings, correctly anticipating many dot-com company executives would sell shares as soon as possible, and that large-scale selling would force down share prices.

=== Spending tendencies of dot-com companies ===
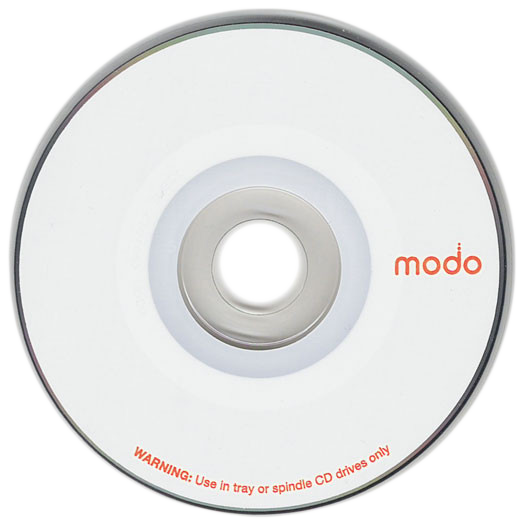
A promotional music CD for the Modo pager

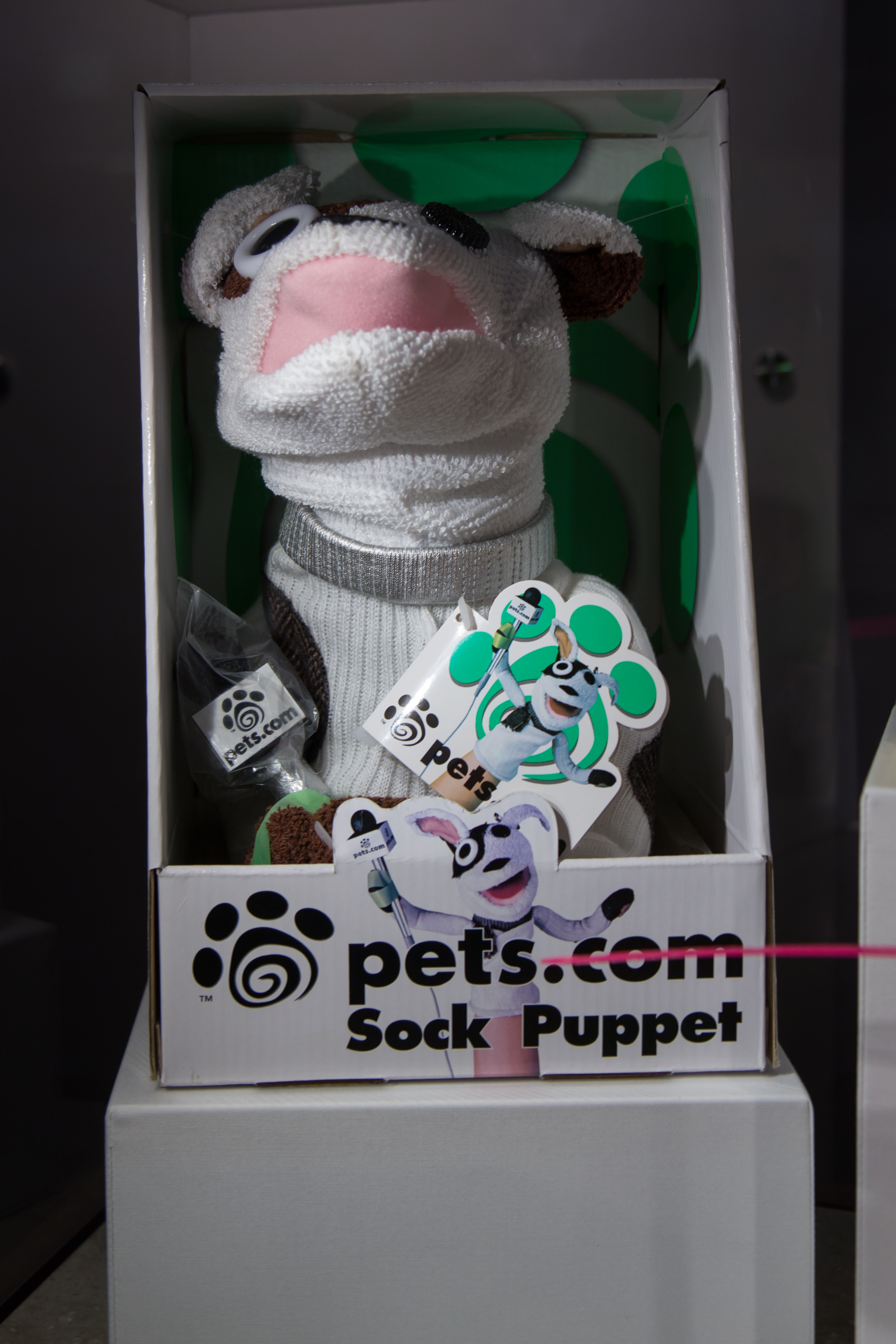
The Pets.com sock puppet who turned into a celebrity and symbol of the dot-com bubble

Dot-com companies spent most of their investments in marketing efforts.

Most dot-com companies incurred net operating losses as they spent heavily on advertising and promotions to harness network effects to build market share or mind share as fast as possible, using the mottos "get big fast" and "get large or get lost". These companies offered their services or products for free or at a discount with the expectation that they could build enough brand awareness to charge profitable rates for their services in the future.

The "growth over profits" mentality and the aura of "new economy" invincibility led some companies to engage in lavish spending on elaborate business facilities and luxury vacations for employees. Upon the launch of a new product or website, a company would organize an expensive event called a dot-com party.

=== Bubble in telecom ===
In the five years after the American Telecommunications Act of 1996 went into effect, telecommunications equipment companies invested more than $500 billion, mostly financed with debt, into laying fiber optic cable, adding new switches, and building wireless networks. In many areas, such as the Dulles Technology Corridor in Virginia, governments funded technology infrastructure and created favorable business and tax law to encourage companies to expand. The growth in capacity vastly outstripped the growth in demand. Spectrum auctions for 3G in the United Kingdom in April 2000, led by Chancellor of the Exchequer Gordon Brown, raised £22.5 billion. In Germany, in August 2000, the auctions raised £30 billion. A 3G spectrum auction in the United States in 1999 had to be re-run when the winners defaulted on their bids of $4 billion. The re-auction netted 10% of the original sales prices. When financing became difficult to obtain as the bubble burst, high debt ratios of some companies led to a number of bankruptcies. Bond investors recovered just over 20% of their investments. However, several telecom executives sold stock before the crash including Philip Anschutz, who reaped $1.9 billion, Joseph Nacchio, who reaped $248 million, and Gary Winnick, who sold $748 million worth of shares.

== Bursting the bubble ==
Historical government interest rates in the United States

Nearing the turn of the 2000s, spending on technology was volatile as companies prepared for the Year 2000 problem. There were concerns that computer systems would have trouble changing their clock and calendar systems from 1999 to 2000 which might trigger wider social or economic problems, but there was virtually no impact or disruption due to adequate preparation. Spending on marketing also reached new heights for the sector: Two dot-com companies purchased ad spots for Super Bowl XXXIII, and 17 dot-com companies bought ad spots the following year for Super Bowl XXXIV.

On January 10, 2000, America Online, led by Steve Case and Ted Leonsis, announced a merger with Time Warner, led by Gerald M. Levin. The merger was the largest to date and was questioned by many analysts. Then, on January 30, 2000, 12 ads of the 61 ads for Super Bowl XXXIV were purchased by dot-coms (sources state ranges from 12 up to 19 companies depending on the definition of dot-com company). At that time, the cost for a 30-second commercial was between $1.9 million and $2.2 million.

Meanwhile, Alan Greenspan, then Chair of the Federal Reserve, raised interest rates several times; these actions were believed by many to have caused the bursting of the dot-com bubble. According to Paul Krugman, however, "he didn't raise interest rates to curb the market's enthusiasm; he didn't even seek to impose margin requirements on stock market investors. Instead, [it is alleged] he waited until the bubble burst, as it did in 2000, then tried to clean up the mess afterward". Finance author and commentator E. Ray Canterbery agreed with Krugman's criticism.

On Friday March 10, 2000, the NASDAQ Composite stock market index peaked at 5,048.62. However, on March 13, 2000, news that Japan had once again entered a recession triggered a global sell off that disproportionately affected technology stocks. Soon after, Yahoo! and eBay ended merger talks and the Nasdaq fell 2.6%, but the S&P 500 rose 2.4% as investors shifted from strong performing technology stocks to poor performing established stocks.

On March 20, 2000, Barron's featured a cover article titled "Burning Up; Warning: Internet companies are running out of cash—fast", which predicted the imminent bankruptcy of many Internet companies. This led many people to rethink their investments. That same day, MicroStrategy announced a revenue restatement due to aggressive accounting practices. Its stock price, which had risen from $7 per share to as high as $333 per share in a year, fell by $140 per share, losing 62% of its value, in a day. The next day, the Federal Reserve raised interest rates, leading to an inverted yield curve, although stocks rallied temporarily.

Tangentially to all of speculation, on April 3, 2000 Judge Thomas Penfield Jackson issued his conclusions of law in the case of United States v. Microsoft Corp. (2001) and ruled that Microsoft was guilty of monopolization and tying in violation of the Sherman Antitrust Act. This led to a one-day 15% decline in the value of shares in Microsoft and a 350-point, or 8%, drop in the value of the Nasdaq. Many people saw the legal actions as bad for technology in general. That same day, Bloomberg News published a widely read article that stated: "It's time, at last, to pay attention to the numbers".

On Friday, April 14, 2000, the Nasdaq Composite index fell 9%, ending a week in which it fell 25%. Investors were forced to sell stocks ahead of Tax Day, the due date to pay taxes on gains realized in the previous year. By June 2000, dot-com companies were forced to reevaluate their spending on advertising campaigns. On November 9, 2000, Pets.com, a much-hyped company that had backing from Amazon.com, went out of business only nine months after completing its IPO. By that time, most Internet stocks had declined in value by 75% from their highs, wiping out $1.755 trillion in value. In January 2001, just three dot-com companies bought advertising spots during Super Bowl XXXV. The September 11 attacks accelerated the stock-market drop. Investor confidence was further eroded by several accounting scandals and the resulting bankruptcies, including the Enron scandal in October 2001, the WorldCom scandal in June 2002, and the Adelphia Communications Corporation scandal in July 2002.

By the end of the stock market downturn of 2002, stocks had lost $5 trillion in market capitalization since the peak. At its trough on October 9, 2002, the NASDAQ-100 had dropped to 1,114, down 78% from its peak.

A common indicator used to show the dramatic rise in the number of dot-com companies is the number of advertisements purchased at the Super Bowl. In 1999, only two internet companies bought advertisements, but that number reached 17 the following year. However, this number sharply decreased in 2001, with only 3 dot-com companies purchasing an advertising slot.

== Aftermath ==
After venture capital was no longer available, the operational mentality of executives and investors completely changed. A dot-com company's lifespan was measured by its burn rate, the rate at which it spent its existing capital. Many dot-com companies ran out of capital and went through liquidation. Supporting industries, such as advertising and shipping, scaled back their operations as demand for services fell. However, many companies were able to endure the crash; 48% of dot-com companies survived through 2004, albeit at lower valuations.

Several companies and their executives, including Bernard Ebbers, Jeffrey Skilling, and Kenneth Lay, were accused or convicted of fraud for misusing shareholders' money, and the United States Securities and Exchange Commission levied large fines against investment firms including Citigroup and Merrill for misleading investors.

After suffering losses, retail investors transitioned their investment portfolios to more cautious positions. Popular Internet forums that focused on high tech stocks, such as Silicon Investor, Yahoo! Finance, and The Motley Fool declined in use significantly.

While the term can refer to present-day companies, it is also used to refer to companies with this business model that came into being during the late 1990s with the rapid growth of the World Wide Web. Many such startups were formed to take advantage of the surplus of venture capital funding and were launched with thin business plans, sometimes with just an idea and a catchy name. The stated goal was often to "get big fast", i.e. to capture a majority share of whatever market was being entered. The exit strategy usually included an IPO and a large payoff for the founders. Others were existing companies that re-styled themselves as Internet companies, many of them legally changing their names to incorporate a .com suffix.

The stock market crash around 2000 that ended the dot-com bubble resulted in many failed and failing dot-com companies, which were referred to punningly as dot-bombs, dot-cons or dot-gones. Many of the surviving firms dropped the .com suffix from their names.

The burst of the dot-com bubble triggered a wave of market panic, leading to widespread sell-offs of stocks from dot-com companies. This selling frenzy further depressed the values of these stocks, and by 2002, estimated investor losses had reached an astounding $5 trillion.

=== Job market and office equipment glut ===
Layoffs of programmers resulted in a general glut in the job market. University enrollment for computer-related degrees dropped noticeably. Aeron chairs, which retailed for $1,100 each, were liquidated en masse.

=== Legacy ===
As growth in the technology sector stabilized, companies consolidated; some, such as Amazon.com, eBay, Nvidia and Google, gained market share and came to dominate their respective fields. The most valuable public companies are now generally in the technology sector.

In a 2015 book, venture capitalist Fred Wilson, who funded many dot-com companies and lost 90% of his net worth when the bubble burst, said about the dot-com bubble:

A friend of mine has a great line. He says "Nothing important has ever been built without irrational exuberance." Meaning that you need some of this mania to cause investors to open up their pocketbooks and finance the building of the railroads or the automobile or aerospace industry or whatever. And in this case, much of the capital invested was lost, but also much of it was invested in a very high throughput backbone for the Internet, and lots of software that works, and databases and server structure. All that stuff has allowed what we have today, which has changed all our lives... that's what all this speculative mania built.

== See also ==
- AI boom
- AI bubble
- Cryptocurrency bubble
- List of stock market crashes and bear markets
- Stock market crash
