= Paul Jr. Designs =

American motorcycle company

Coordinates: 41.5304°N 74.1352°W

- Type: Private
- Industry: Motorcycle
- Founded: 2009
- Headquarters: Montgomery, NY, USA
- Products: Custom motorcycles
- Number of employees: 7
- Website: pauljrdesigns.com

Paul Jr. Designs (PJD) is a motorcycle customizer, based in Montgomery, New York, USA. Paul Teutul Jr. founded the design firm in 2009 after waiting out a one-year non-compete clause with his former company, Orange County Choppers (OCC).

Teutul opened the motorcycle company in April 2010. TLC then commissioned a spin-off series titled American Chopper: Senior vs. Junior, based on the original series American Chopper which ran for 6 seasons, now featuring builds from Orange County Choppers and Paul Jr. Designs.

== Current Personnel ==
- Robert Mickiewicz - Business Development (Freelance)
- Paul Teutul Jr. – Owner, President, Designer, Fabricator & Assembler
- Rachael Teutul - Senior Vice President
- Brendon Thompson – Fabricator & Assembler (Freelance)

=== Former Personnel ===
- Brian Baker - Operations Director
- Robert "Nub" Collard – Graphic Artist & Painter (Freelance)
- Cody Connelly – Mechanic, Fabricator & Assembler
- Vincent DiMartino – Mechanic, Machinist, Fabricator & Assembler
- John “Odie” Odendahl - Shop Assistant & Assembler
- Jason Puhl - Machinist (Freelance)
- Joe Puliafico - Chief Operations Officer & General Manager
- Lee Stamper - Fabricator & Assembler (Freelance)
- Michael Teutul (Freelance)
- Christian Welter - Mechanic (Freelance)

== Bikes featured on American Chopper ==
- "AntiVenom" Bike
- GEICO Bike
- Carolina Carports Bike
- Faro Bike
- Universal Insurance Bikes 1 & 2
- Jared Allen Wounded Warriors Bike
- CrankyApe Bikes 1 & 2
- Cadillac Bike
- F.I.S.T Security Bike
- Gears Of War Trike
- Cepheid Bike
- Dekalb 100th Anniversary Bike
- 9/11 Memorial Bike
- P-51 Mustang Bike (Biker Build-Off 2011 winner)
- Wielka Orkiestra (Poland) Charity Bike
- One Call Concepts Bike
- "Black Widow" Bike (restoration)
- March of Dimes Bike
- Newmont Mining Bike
- Aaron Rowand Bike
- Skilsaw Bike
- GEICO Armed Forces Bike
- Loopster Trike
- QUBX Bike
- RoadLok Bike
- Classic Car Bike (Biker Build-Off 2012 winner)
- New York Yankees Bike

== Cadillac build off ==
GM/Cadillac challenged both Orange County Choppers and PJD to design a bike using the 2011 Cadillac CTS-V-automobile as the inspiration. Proceeds from the auction of the bikes would be donated to Cure Duchenne. Orange County Choppers designed a traditional classic but technical bobber bike, while PJD designed a "stretched-out" chopper with smooth lines, airbags that lower and raise the bike with no kick stand and CTS-V parts included in the bike.

Fan votes decided the winner of the build-off and PJD's bike won in a landslide receiving 200,000+ votes while OCC's bike received 9,000+ votes.

== Biker Build-Offs ==
=== 2011 ===
The December 5, 2011 edition of American Chopper was a special two-hour episode featuring a three-way build-off between PJD, OCC, and Jesse James.

Inspired by an actual Titan T-51 Mustang that was brought into the shop, PJD built a bike in tribute to the 3/4 near-scale replica kit plane. The bike has rivets with round heads that stick out like the T-51 and, despite having plenty of room, has four exhaust outlets per side. A real North American P-51 has rivets that are flush and six outlets per side for its V-12 engine.

OCC opted for their most radical design to date, an all-electric prone-rider tadpole trike with caterpillar tracks instead of wheels. James fielded one of his traditional hand-built choppers.

On December 6, during a live edition of American Chopper, PJD and the T-51 Mustang bike won the online fan voting and was declared the winner of the buildoff. James came in second, with OCC coming in last.

=== 2012 ===
The following year, the three teams would face-off in a rematch, with Gas Monkey Garage (featured on the Discovery Channel show Fast N' Loud) also in the competition. A major point of contention in this build-off was Jesse James' failures to meet the deadlines for completion, requiring extensions each time. Gas Monkey Garage was especially upset, eventually leading to heated confrontations with James at the live build-off results show on December 12.

PJD would wind up repeating as Build-Off Champions, with their bike inspired by classic cars winning the fan voting. The bike was highlighted by the use of an actual grill from a '39 Chevrolet, around which the rest of the bike was built.

== Other projects ==
- A municipal dog park for Montgomery, New York.
- Coleman's 10th anniversary "Roadtrip Grill"
- A racing 4-wheel ATV (quad) for Blingstar
- Assisted in designing a dragon themed gun for Red Jacket Firearms (as featured in a crossover episode of American Chopper and Sons of Guns).
- A custom 2012 Chevrolet Camaro muscle car (as featured on a special episode of American Chopper)
- A motorcycle themed playground set designed and built by Cre8Play
- Assisted in designing custom bicycles based on the "Black Widow", "Anti-Venom", and P-51 Mustang motorcycles for Dynacraft
- In April 2014 Paul Jr. Designs was engaged to build two choppers for Blizzard Entertainment, representing the two factions (HORDE & ALLIANCE) in the MMORPG World of Warcraft. There was a vote on which bike will be implemented in the next WoW Addon. The Horde chopper won the vote, and will be supplied free to Horde characters on WoW accounts which log in before September 30, 2014 . The Alliance chopper will be available in exchange for in-game currency at some point in the Warlords of Draenor expansion. Azeroth Choppers

== Choppers Owned By Paul Jr. Designs ==
- Spider-Man Bike (OCC 2002)
- Black Widow (OCC 2003, Refurbished PJD 2011)
- NY Jets Bike (OCC 2004)
- NY Yankees Bike (OCC 2005, Rebuilt by OCC/PJD 2018)
- Antivenom (PJD 2010)
- Universal Property & Casualty Insurance Bike (PJD 2011)
- Build Off 1 / Titan T-51 Mustang Bike (PJD 2011)
- QUBX Bike (PJD 2012)
- Build Off 2 / Classic Cars Bike (PJD 2012)
- Rocksteady Bike (PJD 2016)
- B-Bop Trike (PJD 2016)
- MLB Network Bike (PJD 2019)
- Hard Rock Hotel & Casino Bike (PJD 2020)

== Brand Extension ==
On the October 15, 2012 episode of American Chopper, it was revealed that PJD had branched out with the creation of PJD Studios, which provides logo design, branding services, and marketing services (including FX and computer animation) for clients. Originally based in a small room at the bike shop, Paul Jr. then decided to buy a building in Newburgh, NY to house the new venture as it looks to expand.
