= Michael Teutul =

American television personality

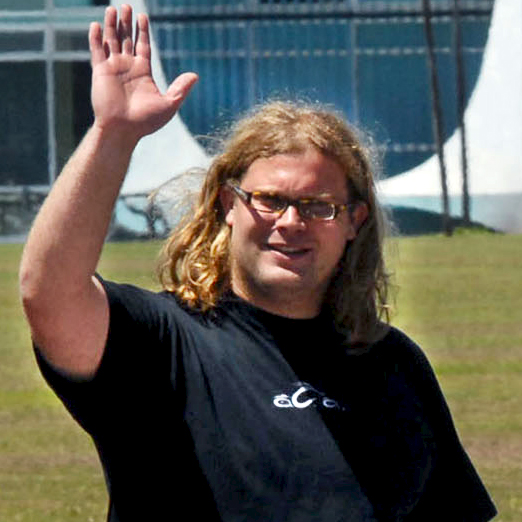
- Teutul in 2007
- Born: Michael Joseph Teutul; November 26, 1978 (age 47)
- Parent(s): Paula Teutul; Paul Teutul Sr.

Michael Joseph Teutul (/ˈtʌtəl/ TUT-əl; born November 26, 1978) is an American television personality who appeared on the reality programs American Chopper and American Chopper: Senior vs. Junior.

== Early life ==
He is the youngest son of Paul Teutul Sr., the founder of Orange County Choppers, and his first wife, Paula Teutul. He is the younger brother of Paul Teutul Jr., the chief fabricator on the show, and Daniel Teutul, the owner/general manager of Orange County Ironworks LLC.

At age 14, Teutul began working at his family's company, the Orange County Iron Works.

== Career ==
After Paul Sr. and Paul Jr. started Orange County Choppers, Teutul joined them as an assistant general manager. His duties involved answering phones and taking out the trash. On rare occasions, Teutul would help build choppers, at one point building his own bike. The family business became the basis for the American Chopper series.

Teutul's role as part of the television shows was to provide comic relief. Teutul frequently appeared at promotional events for the company. Teutul appeared on Late Show with David Letterman, Late Night with Conan O'Brien and The Tonight Show with Jay Leno.

In December 2009 it was revealed on American Chopper that Michael Teutul had checked himself into a rehabilitation center to overcome an alcohol addiction.

Toward the end of the series, Teutul tried to mediate the ongoing disputes between Paul Sr. and Paul Jr. As revealed in season 6 episode 13, Michael was forced out of the business. Paul Sr. stated that Michael had many opportunities to be successful at OCC but never followed through on them. Michael joined Paul Jr. in his new business venture, Paul Jr. Designs.

Teutul's hobbies include painting and skeet shooting. In 2011 Teutul was attempting to market a line of gourmet pasta sauces under the moniker FarQueue Products, LLC. That same year he opened an art gallery titled Mikey Teutul's Wolfgang Gallery which closed in June 2013 due to declining sales.

While Teutul had appearances working with his brother Paul Teutul Jr. at his custom motorcycle and logo design, branding services, and marketing services business Paul Jr. Designs, While he doesn't build choppers anymore, he remains involved in the business and has explored other entrepreneurial ventures media management and spokesperson duties.
