= Paul Teutul Jr. =

American motorcycle designer and builder

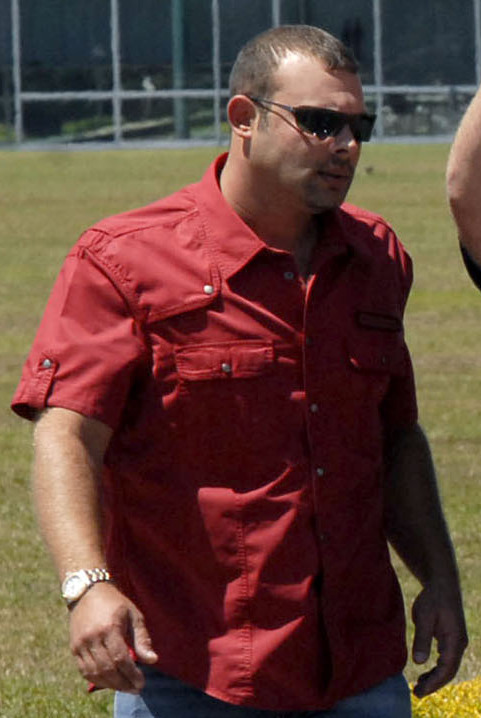
- Teutul Jr. in 2007
- Born: Paul Michael Teutul; October 2, 1974 (age 52)
- Occupations: Motorcycle designer and builder, founder of Paul Jr. Designs
- Television: American Chopper
- Spouse: Rachael Biester Teutul (m. 2010)
- Children: 1
- Parent(s): Paula Teutul; Paul Teutul Sr.
- Website: pauljrdesigns.com

Paul Michael Teutul (/ˈtʌtəl/ TUT-əl; born October 2, 1974) is one of the stars of the American reality television series American Chopper, also starring his father (Paul John Teutul). Paul was the chief designer and fabricator. Prior to this, he was head of the rail shop at Orange County Ironworks. He is the founder of Paul Jr. Designs, which manufactures custom motorcycles and sells branded clothing. Teutul, along with his father and younger brother Michael, became celebrities when they became the focus of a reality television series American Chopper on Discovery Channel in 2002.

== Early life ==
Paul Jr. is the eldest of four children. His siblings include two younger brothers, Daniel, who is the owner and general manager of Orange County Ironworks LLC, and Michael, who appeared alongside him on the family’s television programs. The youngest sibling is a sister.

== Falling out ==
On the April 9, 2009 episode of American Chopper, following a disagreement with his father and business partner, Teutul's employment was terminated. They attempted to resolve their disagreements, and he returned to work for OCC. The April 30, 2009 episode reveals that Teutul ultimately decided to voluntarily terminate his employment as a full-time member of the staff. In subsequent episodes, Teutul returned to OCC as a consultant, helping with bike builds when his father was away from the shop, and on motorbike builds needing additional manpower.

== Paul Jr. Designs ==
Teutul opened his own design firm Paul Jr. Designs, and, in 2009, designed a dog park in Montgomery, New York. His first product design was a "facelift" for Coleman's 10th anniversary "Roadtrip Grill" in 2010. On the February 4, 2010 American Chopper episode "Stewart-Haas Bike", Teutul pitched a line of dog toys to Bamboo Pets.

It was reported in mid April 2010 by TMZ, that Teutul planned to start his own motorcycle business to go head-to-head against OCC. The report states that Teutul is bringing on several former OCC employees, including Michael Teutul, Vinnie DiMartino, Joe Puliafico, and Robert "Nub" Collard. After waiting out a one-year non-compete clause with Orange County Choppers, Teutul began building motorcycles at PJD, which is featured on a new series, American Chopper: Senior vs. Junior, on the Discovery Channel. The company now competes directly with OCC. Former OCC employee Cody Connelly has since joined PJD. In 2014, PJD assembled two teams to create two Azeroth Choppers for Blizzard Entertainment's World of Warcraft which appeared in the game. In 2016, PJD created two bikes for the feature film Teenage Mutant Ninja Turtles: Out of the Shadows.

== Lawsuit ==
=== Bankruptcy fraud ===
Paul John, Paul Michael and his brother Daniel were named in a 2007 lawsuit alleging fraudulent transfer, brought on behalf of Turner Construction. This dates back to 2003 and a ruling in favor of Turner in 2005 concerning the original OC Iron Works company. It was alleged that assets were stripped from the OC Ironworks, transferring the viable assets, contracts and personnel to a new company OC Ironworks LLC, before bankrupting the former. This involved transferring the ownership to Paul Jr. and allegedly selling the assets to the new company with unfair compensation. Trustee Tom Genova filed fraud complaints in 2007 with the Bankruptcy Court and in complaint sought to have the transfers from the old company to the new company judged fraudulent and set aside. He also sought to make the new company liable for the old company's debts. A proposed settlement was reached with Orange County LLC paying out $500,000 to Genova to be distributed to the creditors.

=== Teutul v Teutul ===
On February 16, 2011, the New York State Unified Court System's website, showed that the Teutul v Teutul civil action was no longer active. The case had been "Disposed", meaning the case was out of the court system. On the August 29, 2011 episode, Teutul Jr. and Teutul Sr. settled the lawsuit with Teutul Sr.'s purchase of Teutul Jr.'s 20% share in Orange County Choppers (OCC), thus ending the lawsuit.

== Personal life ==
On August 20, 2010, Teutul Jr. married Rachael Biester. They appeared on the TLC show Say Yes to the Dress. On February 3, 2015, his wife gave birth to their son, Hudson Seven Teutul.
