= Ben Hardy (motorcycle builder) =

American motorcycle builder

- Born: July 25, 1921 Lincoln County Georgia = Los Angeles, California, U.S.
- Died: 1994
- Occupation: Custom motorcycle designer
- Known for: Captain America and Billy choppers for Easy Rider

Benjamin F. Hardy (1921–1994) was an American custom motorcycle builder who made the Captain America and Billy choppers for the 1969 Peter Fonda road movie Easy Rider.

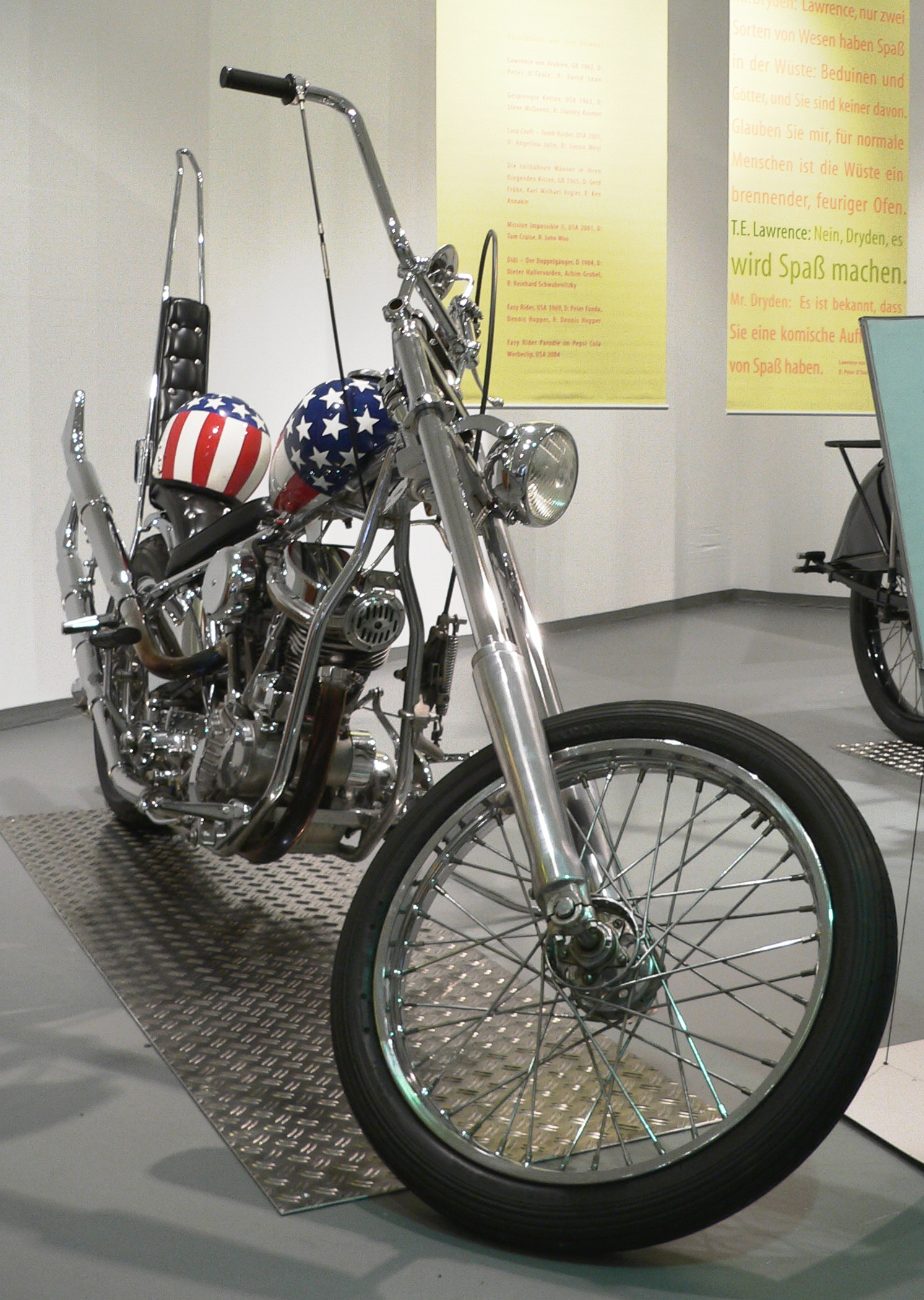
Replica of the "Captain America" bike in the Deutsches Zweirad- und NSU-Museum.

The Captain America bike, made from a then 20-year-old, heavily customized Harley-Davidson panhead is considered one of the most iconic motorcycles ever built, one which captured the zeitgeist of a generation and became an anti-establishment symbol.

Working with another Black motorcycle builder, coordinator Cliff Vaughs, Hardy built two 'Billy' bikes and three 'Captain Americas', one of which was destroyed in the making of the movie, the rest of which were stolen. The 'Billy' bike was typical of the custom motorcycles Black bikers were riding at the time.

Hardy and Vaughs remained largely unknown and uncredited for 25 years as they were not accepted due to being African-Americans, and were not welcomed into the mainstream motorcycle world in the USA.

Known locally as "Benny" and "King of Bikes" Ben Hardy's Motorcycle Service was located at 1168 E. Florence in Los Angeles. He was a mentor to many of the local motorcyclists in South Central, Los Angeles.

His work was featured in the “Black Chrome” exhibition at the California African American Museum.
