= Peter Fonda =

American actor and filmmaker (1940–2019)

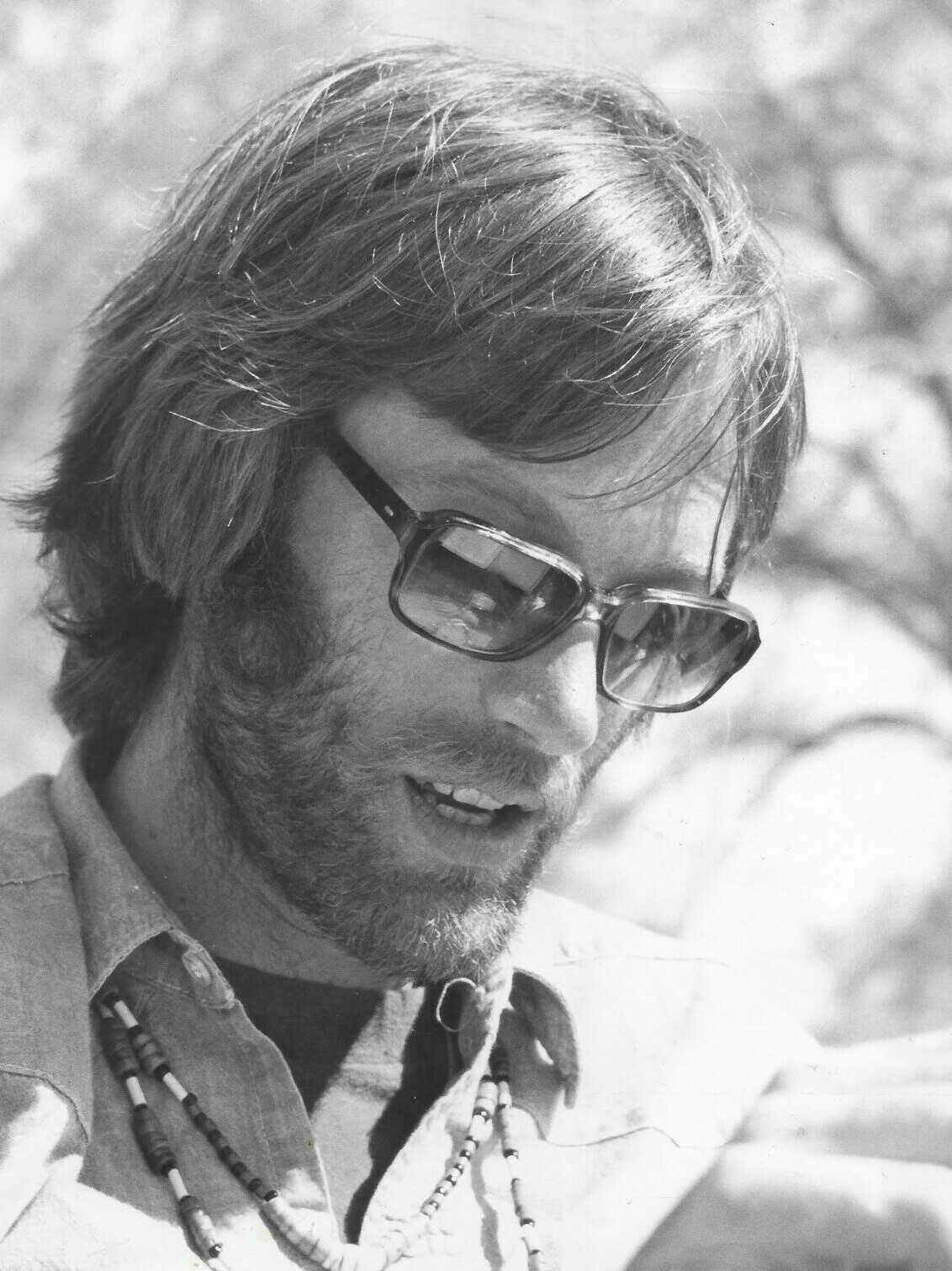
- Fonda in 1970
- Born: Peter Henry Fonda; February 23, 1940; New York, New York, U.S.
- Died: August 16, 2019 (aged 79); Los Angeles, California, U.S.
- Education: University of Nebraska Omaha
- Occupation: Actor
- Years active: 1957–2019
- Spouses: Susan Jane Brewer (m. 1961; div. 1974) Portia Rebecca Crockett (m. 1975; div. 2011) Margaret DeVogelaere (m. 2011)
- Children: 3, including Bridget Fonda
- Parents: Henry Fonda (father); Frances Ford Seymour (mother)
- Relatives: Jane Fonda (sister); Troy Garity (nephew)

Peter Henry Fonda (February 23, 1940 – August 16, 2019) was an American actor, film director, and screenwriter. He was twice an Academy Award nominee, both for acting and screenwriting, and a two-time Golden Globe Award winner for his acting. He was a member of the Fonda acting family, as the son of actor Henry Fonda, the brother of actress and activist Jane Fonda, and the father of actress Bridget Fonda.

Fonda began his career on stage, winning a New York Drama Critics' Circle Award and the Theatre World Award for his performance in the play Blood, Sweat and Stanley Poole. He became a prominent figure in the counterculture of the 1960s, starring in and co-writing the film Easy Rider (1969), which earned him an Oscar nomination for Best Original Screenplay. He then made his directorial debut with the Revisionist Western film The Hired Hand (1971), in which he also starred. During the following decade, he established himself as an action star, appearing in a variety of productions including Dirty Mary, Crazy Larry (1974) and Futureworld (1976).

Fonda achieved a major critical comeback with his starring role in the drama film Ulee's Gold (1997), receiving an Oscar nomination for Best Actor and a Golden Globe Award for Best Actor – Motion Picture Drama. He also won the Golden Globe for Best Supporting Actor – Series, Miniseries or Television Film for The Passion of Ayn Rand (1999). In 2003, Fonda received a star on the Hollywood Walk of Fame at 7018 Hollywood Blvd, for his contributions to the film industry.

== Early life ==
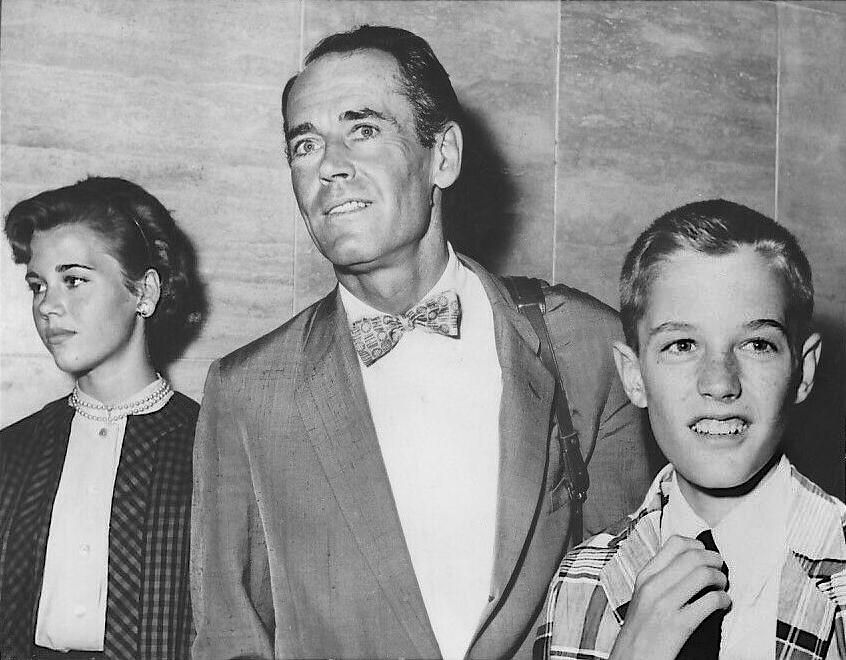
Jane, Henry and Peter Fonda in July 1955

Fonda was born by caesarean section (C-section) on February 23, 1940, at LeRoy Hospital in Lenox Hill, Manhattan, New York City, the only son of actor Henry Fonda and socialite Frances Ford Seymour; his older sister is actress Jane Fonda. He and Jane had a half-sister, Frances de Villers Brokaw (1931–2008), from their mother's first marriage. Their mother committed suicide in a mental hospital when Peter, her youngest, was 10. He did not discover the circumstances or location of her death until he was 15.

One month prior to his 11th birthday, he accidentally shot himself in the abdomen and nearly died. He went to Ossining Hospital, in Ossining, New York and stayed for a few months for recovery. Years later, while taking LSD with John Lennon and George Harrison, he referred to this incident, saying, "I know what it's like to be dead." This inspired the Beatles' song "She Said She Said" from their seventh studio album Revolver (1966).

Peter attended the Fay School in Southborough, Massachusetts, and was a member of the Class of 1954. He then matriculated in Westminster School, a Connecticut boarding school in Simsbury, where he graduated in 1958.

Once he graduated, Fonda studied acting in Omaha, Nebraska, his father's hometown. While attending the University of Nebraska Omaha, Fonda joined the Omaha Community Playhouse.

== Career ==
=== Early years and film work ===
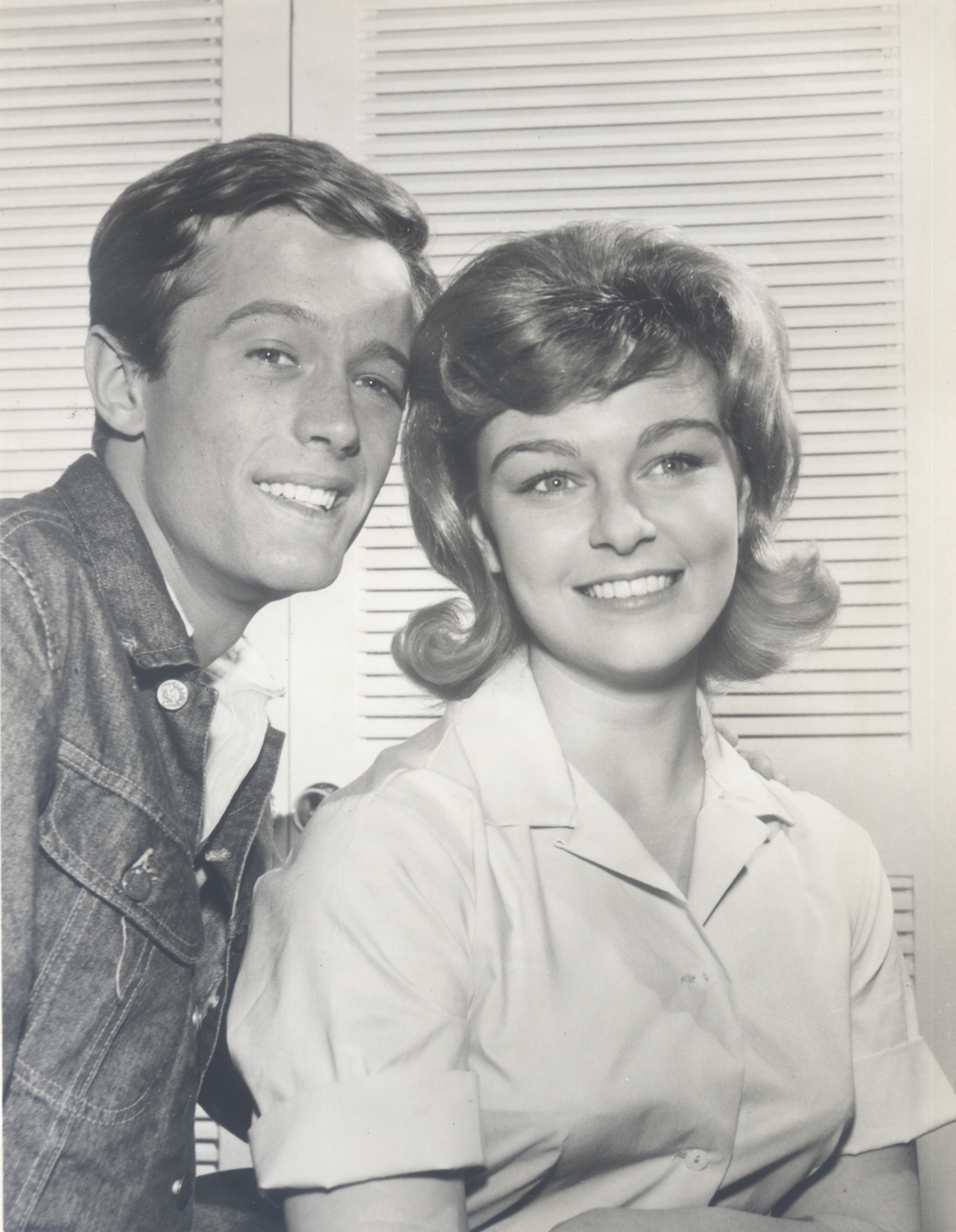
Fonda guest starring with Patty McCormack in The New Breed television series, 1962

Upon his return to New York, Fonda joined the Cecilwood Theatre in 1960. Afterwards, he found work on Broadway and gained notice in Blood, Sweat and Stanley Poole, written by James and William Goldman, which ran for 84 performances in 1961. Fonda began guest starring on television shows like Naked City, The New Breed, Wagon Train, and The Defenders.

Fonda's first film came when producer Ross Hunter was looking for a new male actor to romance Sandra Dee in Tammy and the Doctor (1963). He was cast in the role, in what was a minor hit. He followed this with a support part in The Victors (1963), a bleak look at American soldiers in World War II, directed by Carl Foreman. Fonda's performance won him a Golden Globe Award for most promising newcomer.

Fonda continued to work in television, guest starring in Channing, Arrest and Trial, The Alfred Hitchcock Hour, and 12 O'Clock High. He also tested for the role of John F. Kennedy in PT-109. Fonda impressed Robert Rossen who cast him in what would be Rossen's last movie, Lilith (1964), alongside Warren Beatty, Jean Seberg and Gene Hackman. Fonda's performance was well reviewed. Shortly before dying, Rossen signed him to a seven-film contract which was to start with an adaptation of Bang the Drum Slowly. Fonda graduated to a starring role in The Young Lovers (1964), about out-of-wedlock pregnancy, the sole directorial effort of Samuel Goldwyn Jr.

=== Counterculture figure and Roger Corman ===
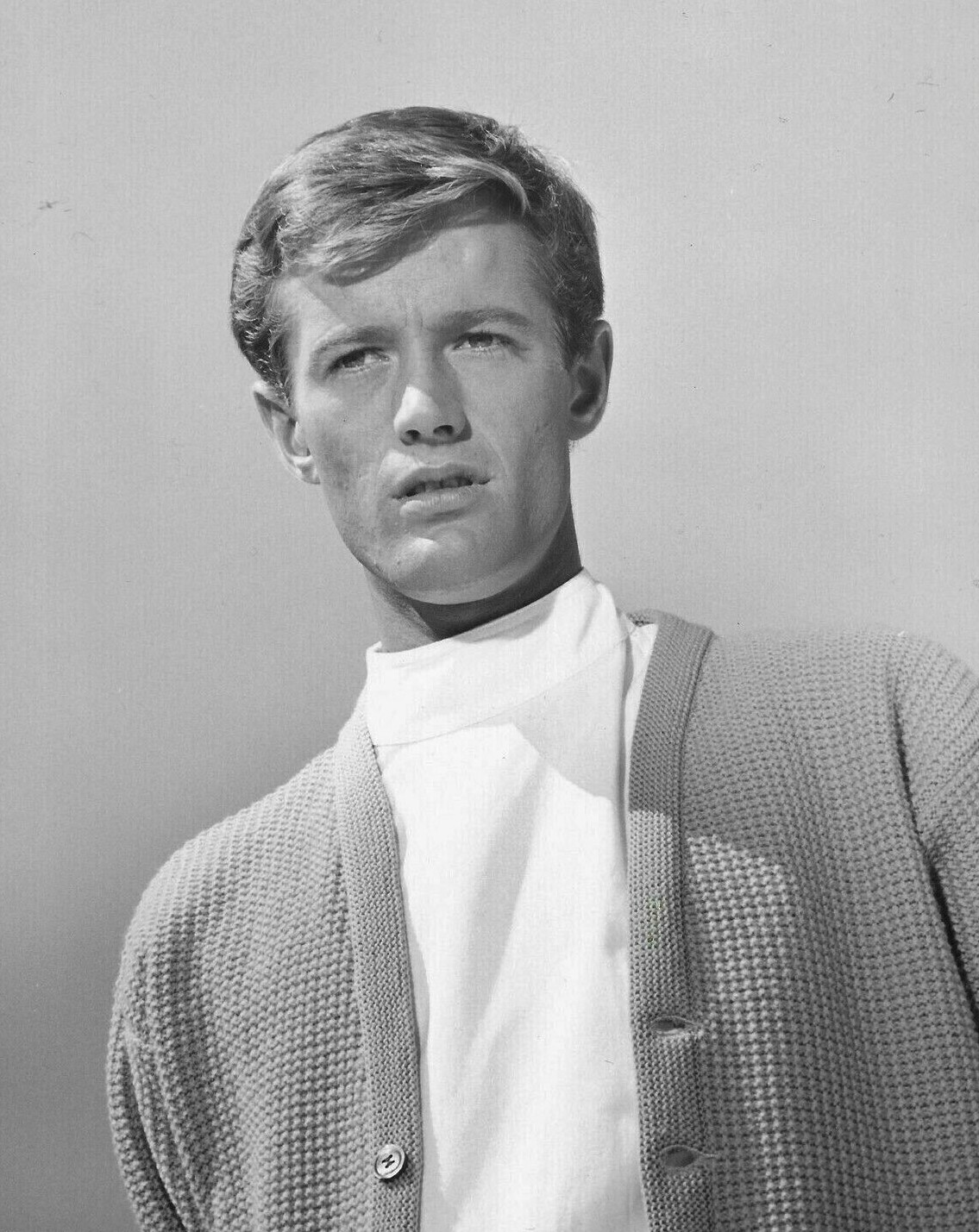
Fonda in a 1962 promo photo

By the mid-1960s, Fonda was not a conventional "leading man" in Hollywood. As Playboy magazine reported, Fonda had established a "solid reputation as a dropout". He had become outwardly nonconformist and grew his hair long and took LSD regularly, alienating the "establishment" film industry. Desirable acting work became scarce. Through his friendships with members of the band The Byrds, Fonda visited The Beatles in their rented house in Benedict Canyon in Los Angeles in August 1965. While John Lennon, Ringo Starr, George Harrison, and Fonda were under the influence of LSD, Lennon heard Fonda say, "I know what it's like to be dead." Lennon used the phrase in the lyrics for his song, "She Said She Said", which was included on their 1966 album, Revolver.

In August 1966 Fonda was charged with possession of marijuana, and was later acquitted in December of that year. In November 1966 Fonda was arrested in the Sunset Strip riot, which the police ended forcefully. The band Buffalo Springfield protested the department's handling of the incident in their song "For What It's Worth". In 1967, Fonda recorded "November Night", a 45-rpm single written by Gram Parsons for the Chisa label, backed with "Catch the Wind" by Donovan, produced by Hugh Masekela.

Fonda's first counterculture-oriented film role was as a biker in Roger Corman's B movie The Wild Angels (1966). Fonda originally was to support George Chakiris, but graduated to the lead when Chakiris revealed he could not ride a motorcycle. In the film, Fonda delivered a "eulogy" at a fallen Angel's funeral service. The movie was a big hit at the box office, screened at the Venice Film Festival, launched the biker movie genre, and established Peter Fonda as a movie name. Fonda made a television pilot, High Noon: The Clock Strikes Noon Again, filmed in December 1965. It was based on the film High Noon (1952), starring Gary Cooper, with Fonda in the Cooper role. It did not become a series.

Fonda next played the male lead in Corman's film The Trip (1967), a take on the experience and "consequences" of consuming LSD, which was written by Jack Nicholson. His co-stars included Susan Strasberg, Bruce Dern, and Dennis Hopper. The movie was a hit. Fonda then traveled to France to appear in the portmanteau horror movie Spirits of the Dead (1968). His segment co-starred his sister Jane and was directed by her then-husband Roger Vadim. For American television, he appeared in a movie, Certain Honorable Men (1968), alongside Van Heflin, written by Rod Serling.

=== Easy Rider ===
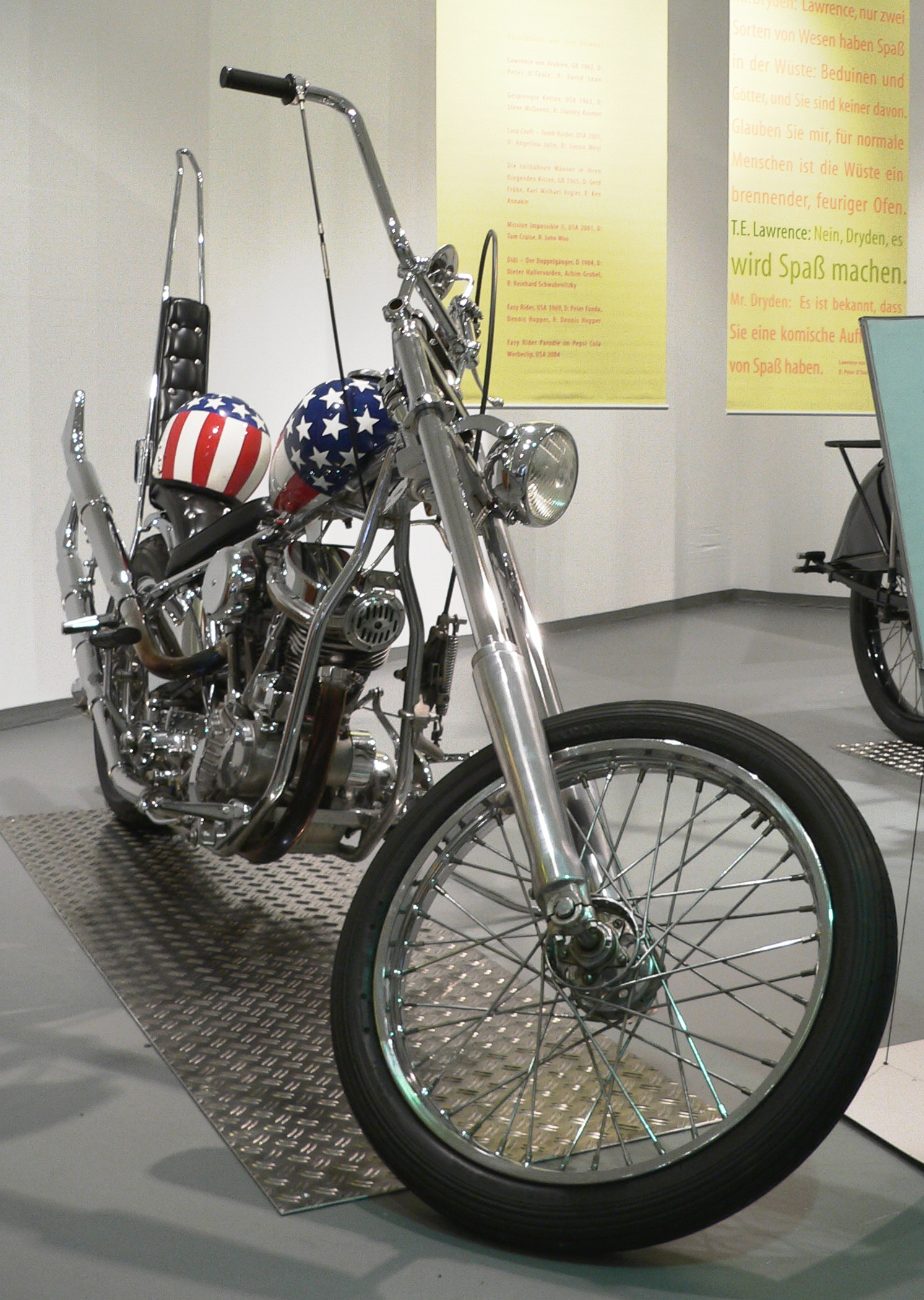
Replica of the "Captain America" Harley-Davidson chopper that Fonda rode in Easy Rider (1969), on display in a German museum.

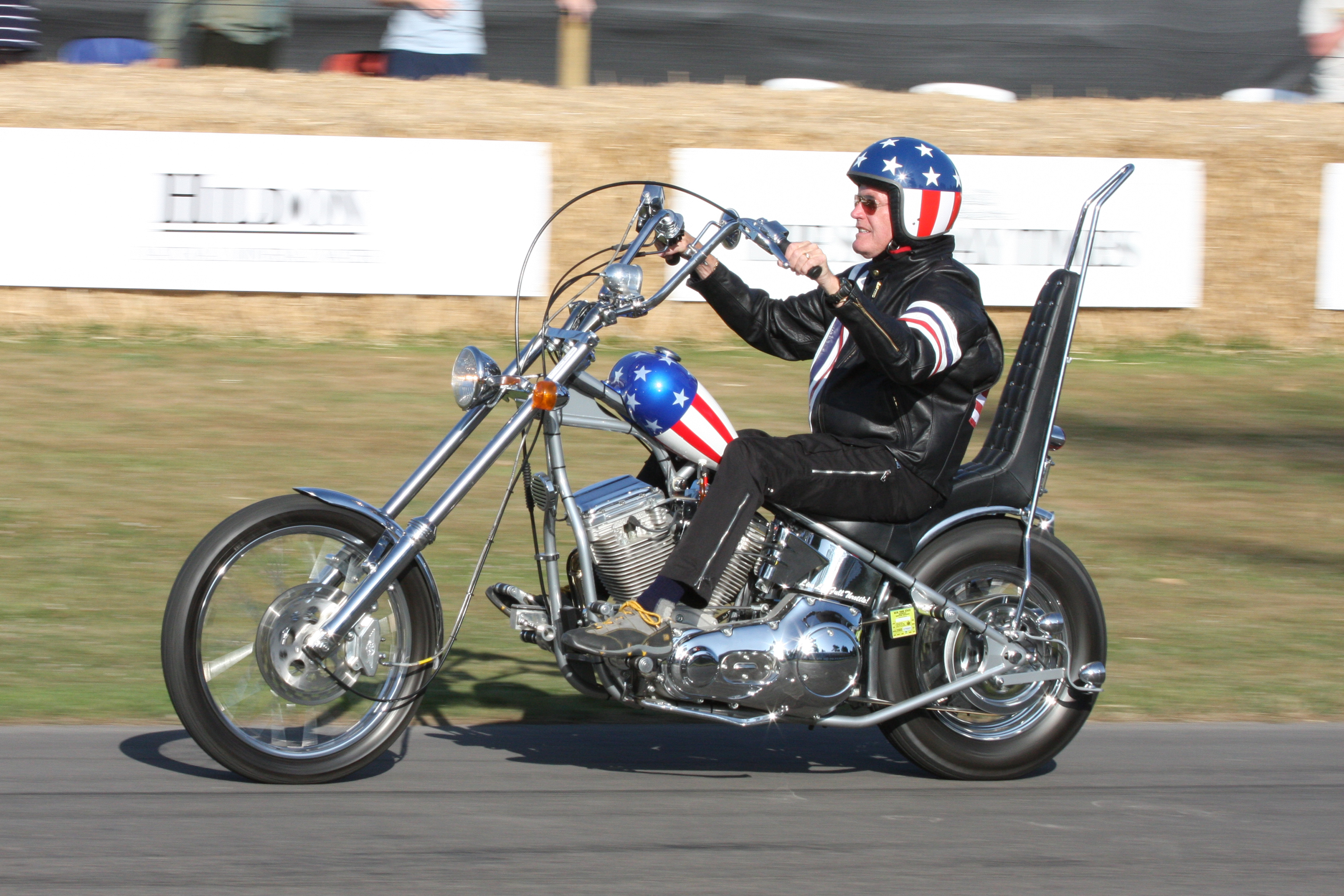
Fonda riding a ″Captain America″ replica at the Goodwood FoS in 2009

Fonda produced, co-wrote and starred in Easy Rider (1969), directed by Dennis Hopper. Easy Rider is about two long-haired bikers traveling on shiny chopper motorcycles through the southwestern and southern United States until they encounter intolerance and violence. The two perform motorcycles stunts at county fairs. Fonda played "Wyatt", a charismatic, laconic man who performed as Captain America. His motorcycle jacket bore a large American flag across the back, and stars&stripes were painted on the gas tank and helmet. Dennis Hopper played his sidekick, the garrulous "Billy". Luke Askew was the stranger on the highway, the first passenger picked up by Fonda. Jack Nicholson played George Hanson, an alcoholic civil rights lawyer who rides along with them. Fonda co-wrote the screenplay with Terry Southern and Hopper.

In 1967, Fonda tried to secure financing from Roger Corman and American International Pictures (AIP), with whom he had made The Wild Angels and The Trip. While promoting the films with a Wild Angelsposter in which Bruce Dern was his passenger on a Harley chopper, he had the idea to make a road movie with two characters, initially called The Loners. With support from Cliff Vaughs, Ben Hardy an others, former LAPD police Harleys were customized into choppers that were not ready when filming the Mardi Gras in New Orleans in early 1968. Hopper had assembled a team of celebrity photographers that used hand-held 16mm cameras, and Corman/AIP were reluctant to finance a film directed in such a way by Hopper. The production then was restarted with backing from the Monkees showrunners, Bob Rafelson and Bert Schneider, who succeeded in getting money from Columbia Pictures. The producers also insisted on Jack Nicholson as Hanson, and also to have somebody to keep an eye on Hopper's directing.

With an experienced crew and László Kovács as cinematographer, Hopper filmed the cross-country road trip depicted almost entirely on location. Fonda had secured funding of around $360,000, largely based on the fact he knew that it was the budget Roger Corman needed to make The Wild Angels. The guitarist and composer Robbie Robertson, of The Band, was so moved by an advance screening that he approached Fonda and tried to convince him to let him write a complete score, even though the film was nearly due for wide release. Fonda declined the offer, instead using Steppenwolf's "Born to Be Wild", Bob Dylan's "It's Alright, Ma (I'm Only Bleeding)" sung by The Byrds' Roger McGuinn, and Robertson's own composition "The Weight", performed by The Band, among many other tracks.

The film was released to international success. Jack Nicholson was nominated for a Best Supporting Actor Oscar. Fonda, Hopper and Southern were nominated for the Academy Award for Best Original Screenplay. The film grossed more than $40 million.

=== Director and action star ===
After the success of Easy Rider, both Hopper and Fonda were sought for film projects. Hopper directed the film The Last Movie (1971), in which Fonda co-starred along with singer Michelle Phillips of The Mamas and the Papas. Fonda directed and starred in the Western film The Hired Hand (1971). He took the lead role in a cast that also featured Warren Oates, Verna Bloom and Beat Generation poet Michael McClure. The film received mixed reviews and failed commercially upon its initial release, but many years later, in 2001, a fully restored version was shown at various film festivals and was re-released by the Sundance Channel on DVD that same year in two separate editions. Fonda later directed the science fiction film Idaho Transfer (1973). He did not appear in the film, and the film received mixed reviews upon its limited release. Around the same time, he co-starred with Lindsay Wagner in Two People (also 1973) for director Robert Wise, in which he portrayed a Vietnam War deserter.

Fonda starred alongside Susan George and longtime-friend (and frequent co-star) Adam Roarke in the film Dirty Mary, Crazy Larry (1974), a film about two NASCAR hopefuls who execute a supermarket heist to finance their jump into big-time auto racing. The film was a box-office hit that year. It led to Fonda's making a series of action movies: Open Season (1974), with William Holden; Race with the Devil (1975), fleeing devil worshippers with Warren Oates (another hit); 92 in the Shade (1975), again with Oates, for writer-director Thomas McGuane; Killer Force (1976) for director Val Guest; Futureworld (1976), a sequel to Westworld (1973), financed by AIP; Fighting Mad (1976), a reuniting with Roger Corman, directed by Jonathan Demme.

Outlaw Blues (1977) was a drama, with Fonda playing a musician opposite Susan Saint James. After some more action with High-Ballin' (1978), Fonda returned to directing, with the controversial drama Wanda Nevada (1979), wherein the 39-year-old Fonda starred as the "love" interest of the then 13-year-old Brooke Shields. His father, Henry Fonda, made a brief appearance as well, and it is the only film in which they performed together.

=== 1980s and 1990s ===
Fonda was top billed in The Hostage Tower (1980), a television movie based on a story by Alistair MacLean. Fonda appeared in the hit film The Cannonball Run (1981) as the "chief biker", a tongue-in-cheek nod to his earlier motorcycle films. He also played a charismatic cult leader in Split Image (1982), a film that also starred James Woods, Karen Allen and Brian Dennehy. Despite the strong cast and positive reviews, the film failed to find an audience.

Fonda later appeared in a series of films in the 1980s of varying genres — Daijōbu, My Friend (1983), shot in Japan; Dance of the Dwarfs (1983); Peppermint Peace (1983), shot in Germany; Spasms (1983), a Canadian horror film with Oliver Reed; A Reason to Live (1985), a TV movie; Certain Fury (1985), with Tatum O'Neal; Mercenary Fighters (1988); Hawken's Breed (1988), a Western; Sound (1988); Gli indifferenti (1989) with Liv Ullmann; and The Rose Garden (1989).

In the early 1990s Fonda also contributed to the script of Enemy (1990), in which he starred. He had the lead in Family Express (1991) and South Beach (1993), but then drifted into supporting roles in many independent films: Deadfall (1993), directed by Christopher Coppola; Bodies, Rest & Motion (1993), starring his daughter Bridget; Molly & Gina (1994) with Frances Fisher and Natasha Gregson; Love and a .45 (1994) with Renée Zellweger; Nadja (1994), produced by David Lynch. He had a good supporting role in Escape from L.A. (1996) from John Carpenter and was in Don't Look Back (1996). He also guest starred on In the Heat of the Night.

After years of films of varying success, Fonda received high-profile critical recognition and universal praise for his performance in Ulee's Gold (1997). He portrayed a taciturn North Florida beekeeper and Vietnam veteran who tries to save his son and granddaughter from a life of drug abuse. For his performance, he was nominated for the Academy Award for Best Actor. He had the lead in Painted Hero (1997). In 1998, Fonda starred in the TV movie The Tempest, based in part on William Shakespeare's play of the same name. It was directed by Jack Bender and starred Fonda, John Glover, Harold Perrineau, and Katherine Heigl.

He played Frank O'Connor in The Passion of Ayn Rand (1998), a performance for which he received a Golden Globe Award in 2000, then appeared in the crime film The Limey (1999) as Terry Valentine, an aging rock music producer who accidentally kills his younger girlfriend. The film was directed by Steven Soderbergh.

Fonda wrote an autobiography, Don't Tell Dad (1998).

In the 1990s, Fonda appeared in an advertisement for American Express.

=== 2000s ===
Fonda's work in the 2000s included parts in South of Heaven, West of Hell (2000), Second Skin (2000), Thomas and the Magic Railroad (2000) Wooly Boys (2001), The Laramie Project (2001), The Maldonado Miracle (2003), Capital City (2004), The Heart Is Deceitful Above All Things (2004), A Thief of Time (2004), Back When We Were Grownups (2004), Supernova (2005), and El cobrador: In God We Trust (2006).

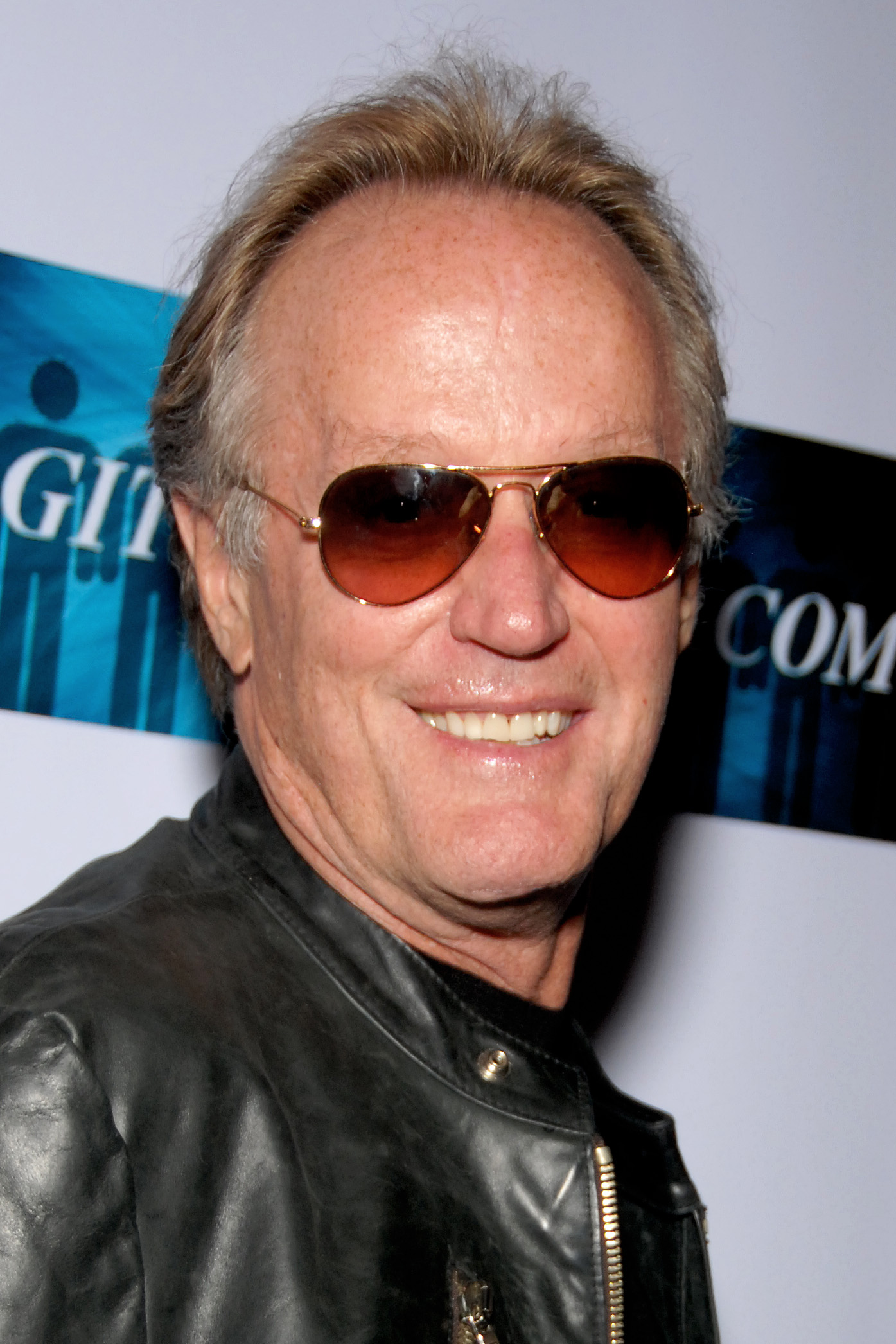
Fonda in 2009

In 2002, Fonda was inducted into the AMA Motorcycle Hall of Fame.

In 2004, he provided the voice of aging hippie weed grower "The Truth" in Grand Theft Auto: San Andreas, which was one of the best-selling video games of all time.

In a 2007 interview, Fonda said that riding motorcycles helped him to focus, stating,

I ride an MV Agusta. This is an Italian racing motorcycle. It forces focus. You have to be focused and in my life, in this business, focus is hard to find sometimes. So I need to force focus and that's great. The bike takes you on a free road. There's no fences on the roads I ride and I don't ride freeways. That's as much as I can tell you, because there are more lands waiting for this little Christian boy. That's not true. I'm an atheist, but what the heck.

Fonda made a return to the big screen as the bounty hunter Byron McElroy in 3:10 to Yuma (2007), a remake of the 1957 Western. He appeared with Christian Bale and Russell Crowe. The film received two Academy Award nominations and positive reviews from critics. He also appeared in the last scenes of the biker comedy Wild Hogs as Damien Blade, founder of the biker gang Del Fuegos and father of Jack, played by Ray Liotta. Fonda also portrayed Mephistopheles, one of two main villains in the film Ghost Rider (also 2007). Although he wanted to play the character in the sequel, he was replaced by Ciarán Hinds.

He appeared in Journey to the Center of the Earth (2008), Japan (2008), and The Perfect Age of Rock 'n' Roll (2009) and as "The Roman", the main villain in The Boondock Saints II: All Saints Day (also 2009), the sequel to The Boondock Saints. Fonda also appeared on the television series Californication.

=== Later career ===
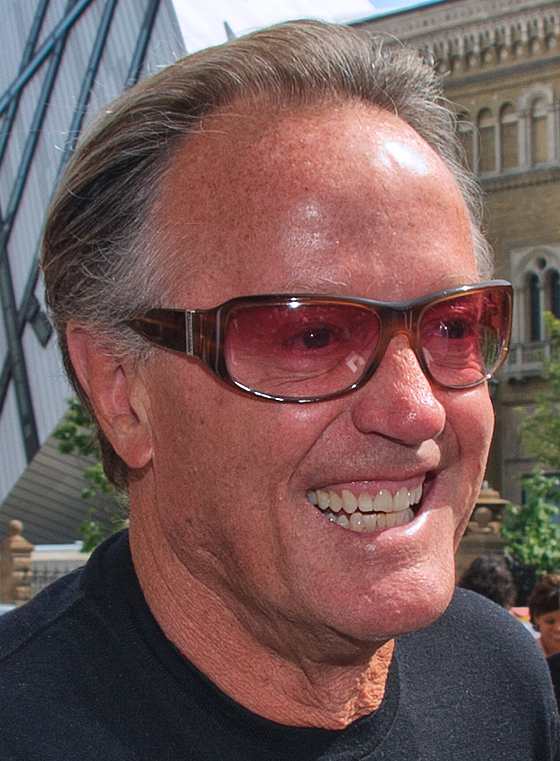
Fonda at the 2010 Toronto International Film Festival

Fonda's later appearances include American Bandits: Frank and Jesse James (2010) for Fred Olen Ray; The Trouble with Bliss (2011); episodes of CSI: NY; Smitty (2012); Harodim (2012); As Cool as I Am (2013); Copperhead (2013); The Ultimate Life (2013); The Harvest (2013); HR (2014); House of Bodies (2014); Jesse James: Lawman (2014); The Runner (2015) with Nicolas Cage; The Ballad of Lefty Brown (2017); The Most Hated Woman in America (2017); Borderland (2017); You Can't Say No (2018); and Boundaries (2018) with Christopher Plummer. He was an executive producer of the documentary The Big Fix (2012).

His final portrayal was in the Vietnam War movie The Last Full Measure, whose director Todd Robinson, has recounted that Fonda was able to view that film in its entirety before his death, and got emotional upon viewing it.

== Honors ==
In 2000, a Golden Palm Star on the Palm Springs, California, Walk of Stars was dedicated to him.

== Personal life ==
Fonda was married three times. He married his first wife, Susan Brewer, in 1961; together they had three children: Bridget, Justin, and Thomas McGuane (stepson). They divorced in 1974 after 13 years of marriage. Fonda married his second wife, Portia Rebecca Crockett, in 1975. The marriage lasted for 36 years until they divorced in 2011. Fonda married his third wife, Margaret DeVogelaere, in 2011. The marriage lasted for eight years until Fonda's death in 2019.

=== Political views ===
In 2011, Fonda and Tim Robbins produced The Big Fix, a documentary that examined the role of BP in the Deepwater Horizon oil spill and its effects on the Gulf of Mexico. At a press conference at the Cannes Film Festival, Fonda stated that he had written to President Barack Obama about the spill and criticized him as a "fucking traitor" for allowing "foreign boots on our soil telling our military—in this case the Coast Guard—what they can and could not do, and telling us, the citizens of the United States, what we could or could not do.'"

In June 2018, Fonda went on Twitter to criticize President Donald Trump's administration's enforcement of U.S. immigration policy by Jeff Sessions for separating children from their parents at the Mexican border, writing that "We should rip Barron Trump from the arms of First Lady Melania Trump and put him in a cage with pedophiles." He also suggested that Americans should seek out names of Immigration and Customs Enforcement (ICE) agents in order to protest outside of their homes and the schools of their children. The Secret Service opened an investigation based on a report from the Trump family. White House Press Secretary Sarah Huckabee Sanders (daughter of prominent Republican politician Mike Huckabee), was also the object of Fonda's tweets, in which he suggested that "Maybe we should take her (Sanders') children away..."

In another later deleted tweet, Fonda targeted United States Department of Homeland Security Secretary Kirstjen Nielsen by calling her a "vulgar" name and calling for Nielsen to be "put in a cage and poked at by passersby ..."

Fonda stated that he deleted his tweet regarding Barron Trump, saying that he "immediately regretted it and sincerely apologize to the family for what I said and any hurt my words have caused." Backlash to Fonda's tweets resulted in a call for a boycott of his newest film, Boundaries, and other Sony projects. Sony Pictures released Boundaries as planned on June 22, 2018, but released a statement stating that Fonda's comments "are abhorrent, reckless and dangerous, and we condemn them completely."

== Death ==
Fonda died from respiratory failure caused by lung cancer at his home in Los Angeles on August 16, 2019, at the age of 79.

Following Fonda's death, his older sister Jane Fonda made the following statement: "I am very sad. He was my sweet-hearted baby younger brother, the talker of the family. I have had beautiful alone time with him these last days. He went out laughing."

== Awards and nominations ==
Award	Year	Category	Work	Result
Academy Award	1969	Best Original Screenplay	Easy Rider	Nominated
Academy Award	1997	Best Actor	Ulee's Gold	Nominated
Bravo Otto	1971	Best Actor	—N/a	Nominated
Chicago Film Critics Association	1998	Best Actor	Ulee's Gold	Nominated
Dallas–Fort Worth Film Critics Association	1997	Best Actor	Ulee's Gold	Won
Daytime Emmy Award	2004	Outstanding Performer in Children's Programming	The Maldonado Miracle	Nominated
Golden Globe	1964	New Star of the Year – Actor	The Victors	Nominated
Golden Globe	1997	Best Actor – Motion Picture Drama	Ulee's Gold	Won
Golden Globe	1998	Best Actor – Miniseries or Television Film	The Tempest	Nominated
Golden Globe	1999	Best Supporting Actor – Series, Miniseries or Television Film	The Passion of Ayn Rand	Won
Independent Spirit Award	1998	Best Male Lead	Ulee's Gold	Nominated
National Society of Film Critics	1998	Best Actor	Ulee's Gold	Nominated
New York Film Critics Circle	1997	Best Actor	Ulee's Gold	Won
New York Drama Critics' Circle Award	1962	Best New Actor	Blood, Sweat and Stanley Poole	Won
Primetime Emmy Award	1999	Outstanding Supporting Actor in a Limited Series or Movie	The Passion of Ayn Rand	Nominated
Screen Actors Guild Award	1998	Outstanding Performance by a Male Actor in a Leading Role	Ulee's Gold	Nominated
Screen Actors Guild Award	1999	Outstanding Performance by a Male Actor in a Miniseries or Television Movie	The Passion of Ayn Rand	Nominated
Screen Actors Guild Award	2007	Outstanding Performance by a Cast in a Motion Picture	3:10 to Yuma	Nominated
Theatre World Award	1962	—N/a	Blood, Sweat and Stanley Poole	Won
Writers Guild of America Award	1970	Best Original Screenplay	Easy Rider	Nominated

== See also ==
- List of atheists in film, radio, television and theater
