= Chopper (motorcycle) =

Type of motorcycle

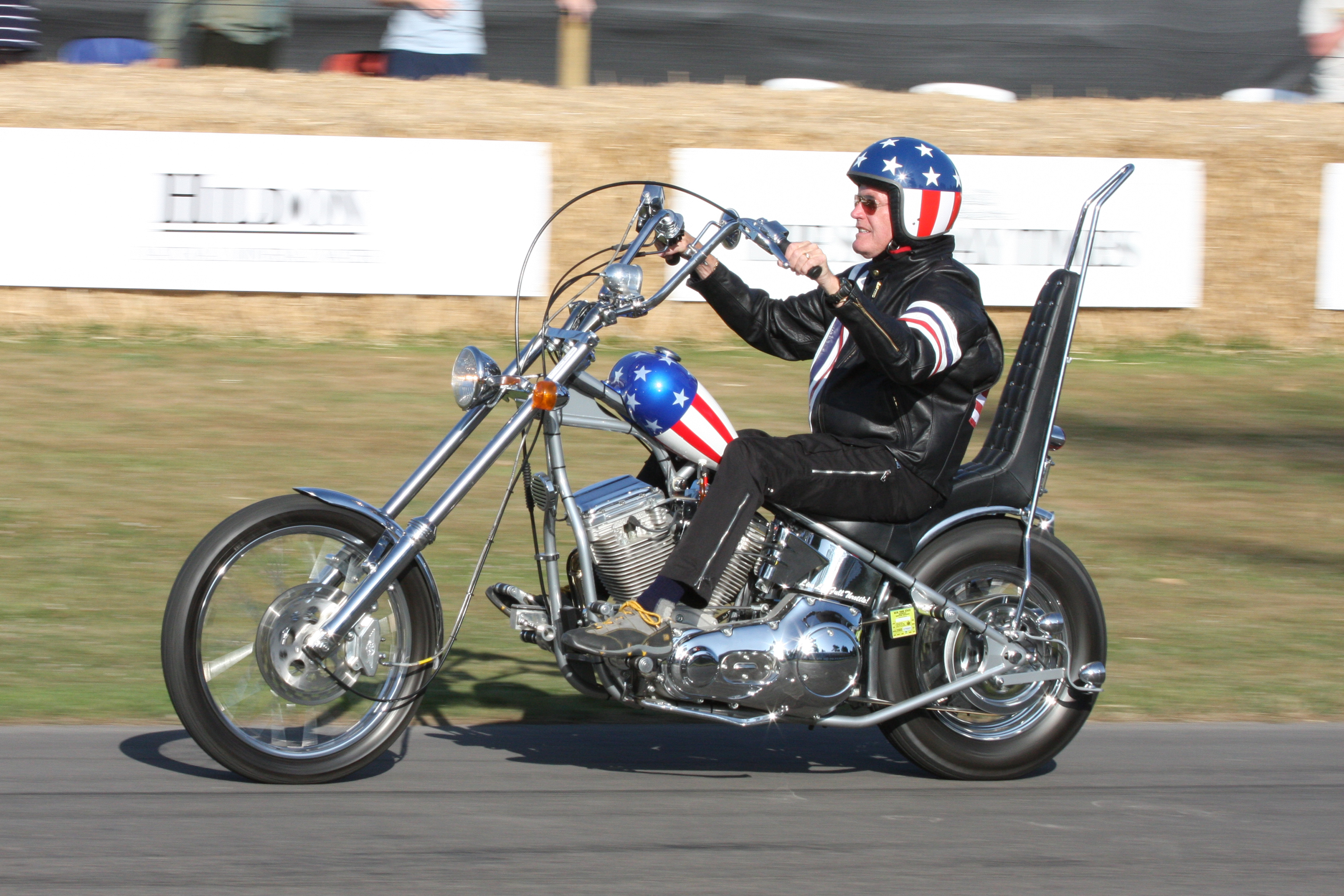
Peter Fonda rides a replica of the "Captain America" bike used in Easy Rider.

A chopper is a custom motorcycle with modified steering angles and lengthened forks for a stretched-out appearance. Choppers emerged in California in the late 1950s following from the bobber style of modified motorcycles. The name comes from the practice of modifying or "chopping" existing motorcycles They can be built from an original motorcycle which is modified or built from scratch. Some characteristic features of choppers are long front ends with extended forks often coupled with an increased rake angle, hardtail frames (frames without rear suspension), very tall "ape hanger" or very short "drag" handlebars, lengthened or stretched frames, large front wheel, and tall sissy bars. To be considered a chopper a motorcycle frame must be cut and welded at some point, hence the name.

Choppers gained widespread popularity following the release of the 1969 film Easy Rider where the main characters rode two customised Harley-Davidsons, the "Captain America" and "Billy Bike", built by Ben Hardy and Cliff Vaughs.

== History ==
=== 1946–1959: the Bob-Job Era ===
Before there were choppers, modified motorcycled known as bobbers which had been relieved of excess weight by removing parts or "bobbed" were created. The fenders would often be removed with the intent of making the bike lighter and faster, or simply for style.

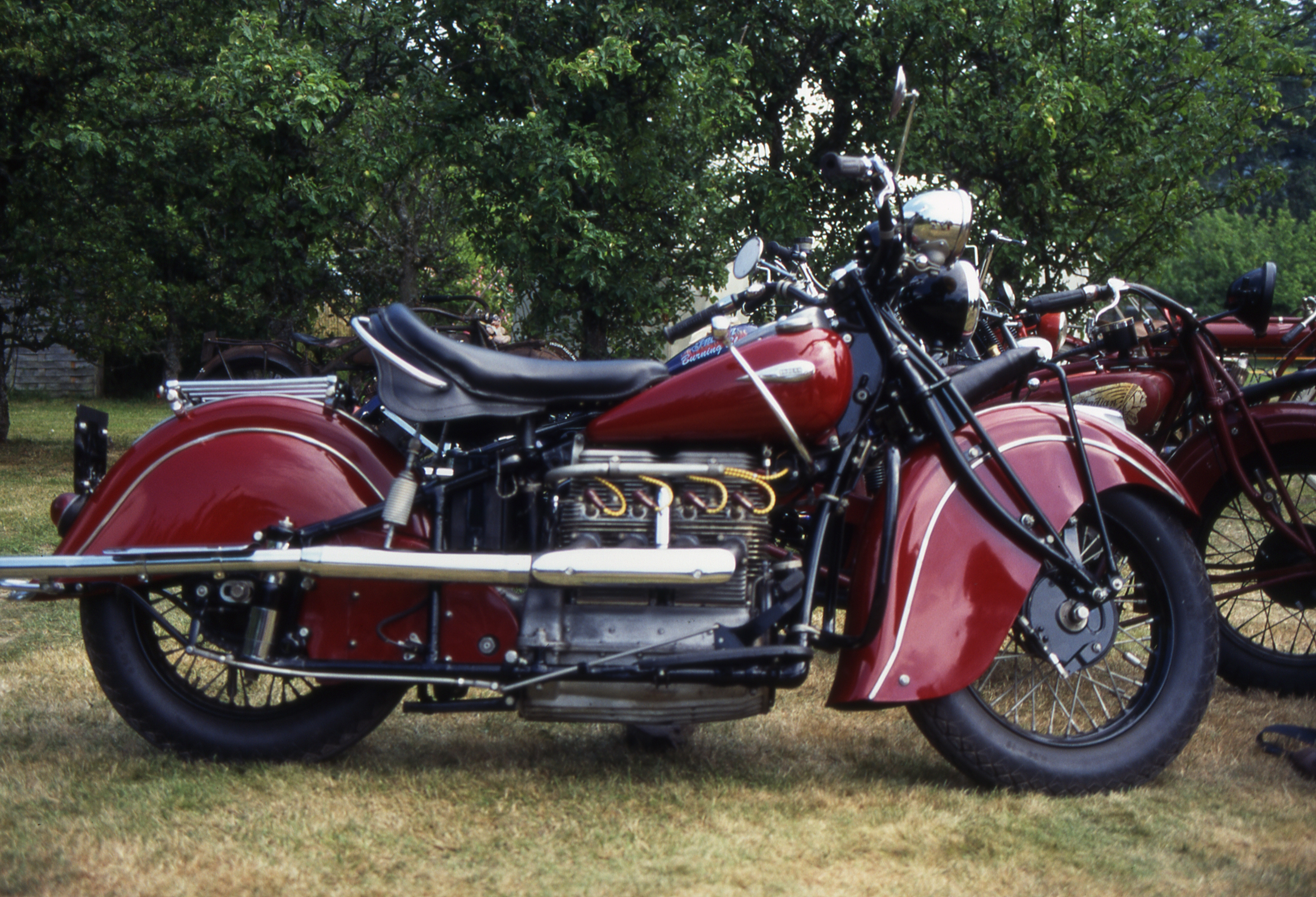
The heavily valanced fenders of the 1940 Indian 440 four.

Indian Scouts and Chiefs of the time came with large, heavily valanced fenders, nearly reaching the center of the wheel on the 1941 Indian Series 441, while racing bikes had tiny fenders or none at all. The large bikes which exemplified the touring motorcycle style provide a counterpoint to both the minimalist bobber and the café racer.

In the post–World War II United States, returning servicemen began the bobber trend by removing all parts deemed too big, heavy, ugly, or not essential to the basic function of the motorcycle, such as fenders, turn indicators, and even front brakes. The large, spring-suspended saddles were also removed to allow the riders to sit as low as possible on the motorcycles' frames. These machines were lightened to improve performance for dirt-track racing and mud racing.

The earliest choppers tended to be based on Harley-Davidson motorcycles, many of which could be found in surplus military and police motorcycles bought cheaply at auction, and to use and modify their stock flathead, knucklehead, and panhead engines. British bikes, particularly Triumphs, were also a popular motor for choppers early on. As the Japanese manufacturers began offering larger engines in the late 1960s, these motors, in particular the Honda 750-4, were also quickly put to use by chopper builders.

Over time choppers became built more to achieve a certain look than to enhance their performance, and their modifications evolved in an artistic, aesthetic direction. By the mid-1970s, stock Japanese and European performance motorcycles would outperform most bobbers and choppers, except in drag racing, which places a premium on pure engine power rather than handling over curvy courses. Chopper styling continued to be influenced by drag-bike modifications through the 1960s and 1970s.

=== Late 1950s to 1960s: early choppers ===
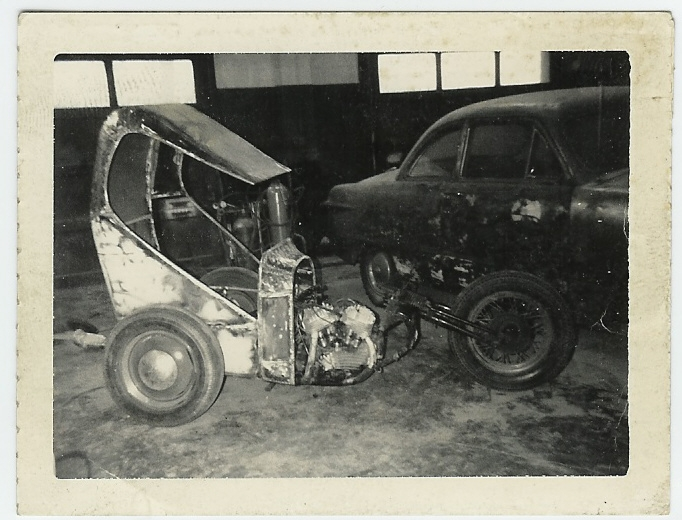
One of the earliest choppers, built by Wild Child's Custom Shop of Kansas City, Missouri.

By the early 1960s enough people were modifying motorcycles, still mostly big Harley-Davidsons, that a certain style had begun to take hold. A set of modifications became common: the fat tires and 16" wheels of the stock motorcycles were replaced with narrower tires often on a larger 19" or 21" wheel. Forward-mounted foot pegs replaced the standard large 'floorboard' footrests. Frequently the standard headlight and fuel tank were replaced with much smaller ones and upgraded chromed parts were added.

The first famous chopper builders came to prominence in this era, including Arlen Ness who was a leader in the "Frisco" or "Bay Area Chopper" style. Ness's bikes were characterized by having long low frames and highly raked front ends, typically 45 degrees or more, and frequently made use of springer front ends.

During the mid 1960s, the first wave of European chopper builders emerged, creating the "Swedish Chopper" style. In 1967 Denver Mullins opened "Denver's Choppers" in San Bernardino, California, and soon became famous for building "long bikes", often referred to as "Swedish Choppers". These featured even longer front ends than the Bay Area style and had a much higher frame. Denver's was particularly well known for the springer forks that they fabricated, as well as the overall style of their bikes.

Choppers were still a niche market at this point so regional variations and formulations flourished. Many innovations were tried in this period and a great deal of knowledge about how to build long bikes that handled well by adjusting rake and trail was developed.

=== 1970s: iconic choppers, diggers and Japanese motors ===
The huge success of the 1969 film Easy Rider instantly popularized the chopper around the world, and drastically increased the demand for them. What had been a subculture known to a relatively small group of enthusiasts in a few regions of the US became a global phenomenon.

The number of chopper-building custom shops multiplied, as did the number of suppliers of ready-made chopper parts. Shops also custom-built exhaust pipes and many of the aftermarket kits followed in the late 1960s into the 1970s. Laws required a retention fixture for the passenger, so vertical backrests called sissy bars became a popular installation, often sticking up higher than the rider's head.

Honda's groundbreaking 750 cc four-cylinder engine, first introduced to America in the 1969 CB-750, became widely available from salvage and wrecking operations and became a popular alternative to Harley-Davidson's motors. Harley's then-current big-twin motor, the Shovelhead, was extremely popular with chopper builders in this era, and use of the older motors, particularly the Knucklehead and Flathead declined as parts became harder to get and the performance of the new motors proved superior.

=== 1980s and 1990s: improved engineering and aftermarket suppliers ===
In 1984 Harley-Davidson, who had been using chopper inspired styling for a number of years, released the 'Softail', a design that hid the rear shocks under the engine creating a profile that looked a lot like a hard tail. This frame was initially offered in the Softail Custom, a bike that took many styling cues from choppers, including the narrow 21" front wheel. Buyers looking for the chopper look had a plausible factory alternative, and interest in choppers declined.

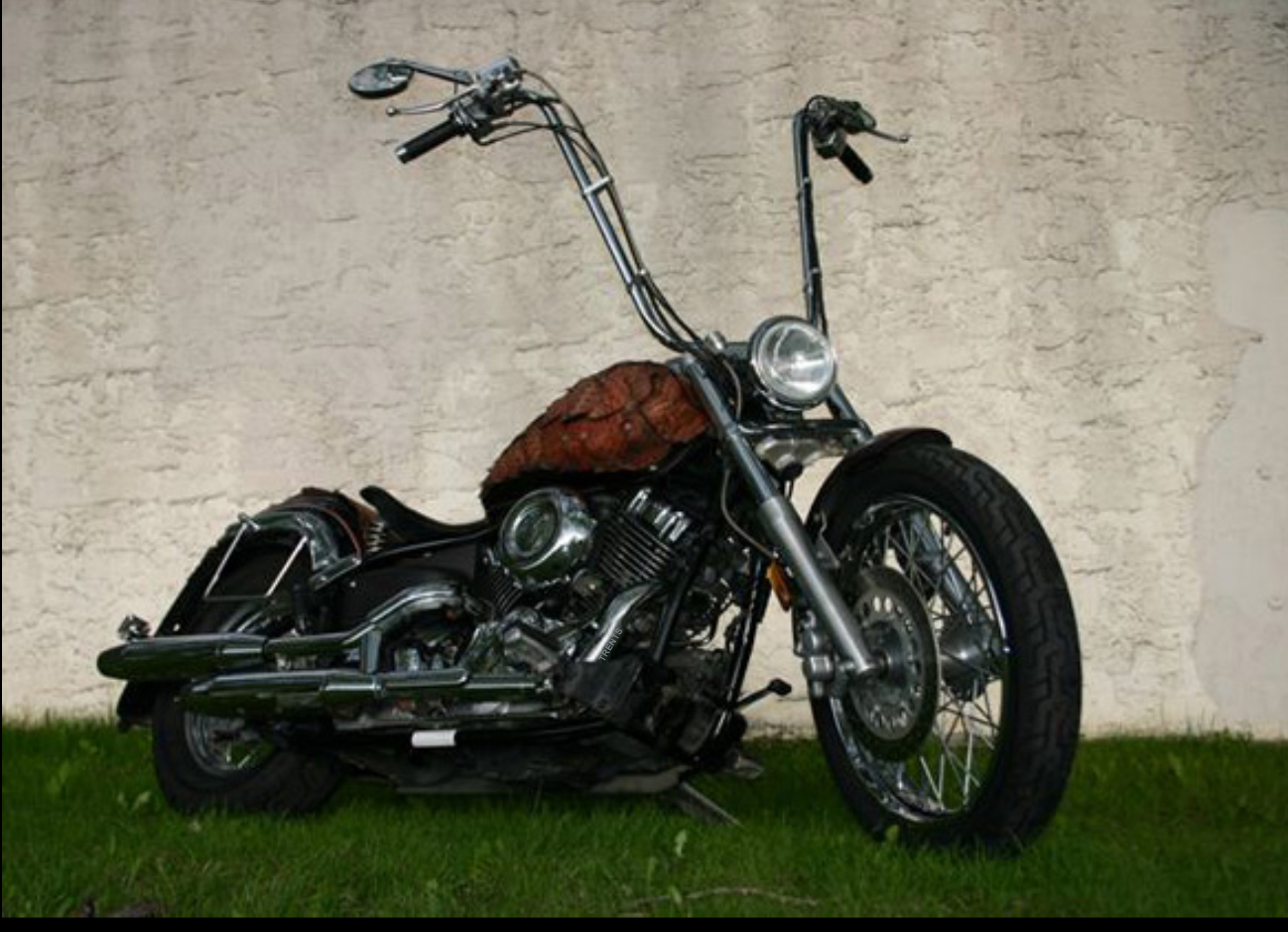
Leather clad, metal lowered seat, and 24 inch rise Ape Hanger handlebars.

In this period, the trend was towards more moderate geometries and it became possible to assemble a complete chopper using all aftermarket parts. Companies like S&S Cycle built complete replacement engines based on Harley-Davidson engines, frame makers such as Paughco offered a variety of hardtail frames, and many bikes were built using these new repro parts. Super long girder and springer forked bikes were less popular in this era, while the use of telescopic forks grew, and builders upgraded to larger diameter tubes in both forks and frames to gain more rigidity.

Japanese manufacturers began offering new motorcycle models, including racing-styled and custom bikes that incorporated chopper design elements. During this period, improvements in materials and fabrication led to the development of larger machines with more powerful engines, stronger frames, and wider tires. By the late 1990s, the use of CNC machining allowed for the production of specialized components from block aluminum.

=== 2000s: reality television ===
Santee "Hardcore II" Custom rigid chopper

The Discovery Channel created a number of television shows around several custom bike builders who built choppers. The first, the 2000 special Motorcycle Mania, followed builder Jesse James of Long Beach, California, and is credited with creating "a new genre of reality TV" around choppers.

The celebrity builders featured on the cable shows enjoyed a large following. Companies like Jesse James' West Coast Choppers have been successful in producing expensive choppers, and a wide range of chopper-themed brands of merchandise such as clothing, automobile accessories and stickers.

The American Chopper reality television series featuring Paul Teutul Sr, and his sons Paul Jr. and Mike, ran six years starting in 2003, and featured bike building at Orange County Choppers (OCC).

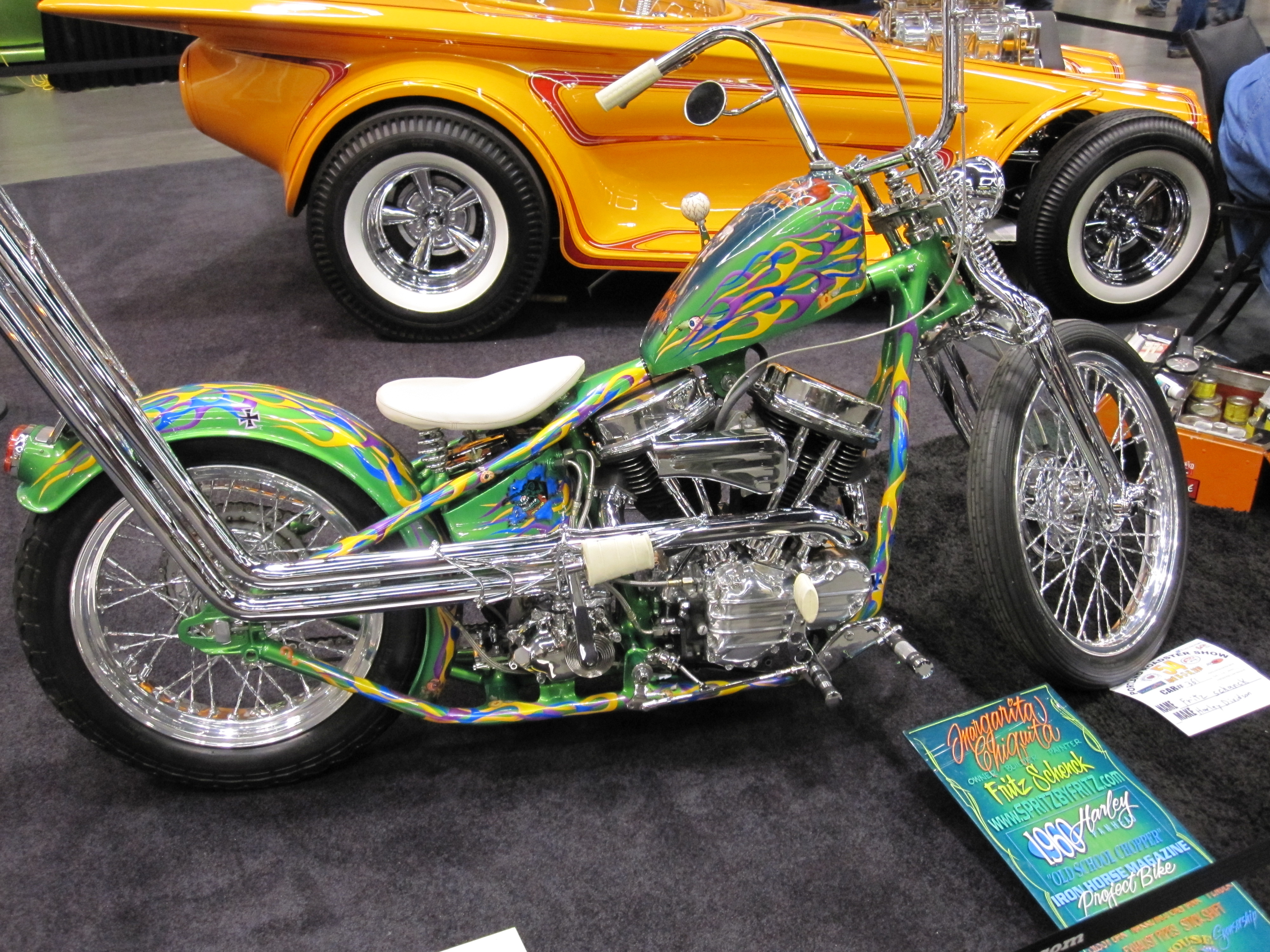
An "old school" styled chopper or custom motorcycle, photographed at the Portland Roadster Show in 2010

== Mimicry of style ==
Many motorcycle companies have made motorcycles designed based on choppers. Harley-Davidson created the "soft-tail", which provided a more comfortable and "factory appropriate" riding experience. The "soft-tail" design attempts to maintain the aggressive riding angles used by chopper builds, while incorporating a shock and swing arm into the frame. Companies often use the term to describe new motorcycles (such as the Honda Fury) which use "chopper-like" design, but isn't an etymologically accurate usage of the word.

== Media ==
Choppers have appeared in many pieces of media, most notably films such as Easy Rider and Ghost Rider (2007 film) which boast unique chopper builds.

Chopper motorcycles are often associated with biker gangs, such as the Hells Angels or Sons of Anarchy.

== See also ==
- Outline of motorcycles and motorcycling
