= Easy Rider =

1969 film by Dennis Hopper

- Theatrical release poster
- Directed by: Dennis Hopper
- Written by: Peter Fonda; Dennis Hopper; Terry Southern
- Produced by: Peter Fonda
- Starring: Peter Fonda; Dennis Hopper; Jack Nicholson
- Cinematography: László Kovács
- Edited by: Donn Cambern; Henry Jaglom (Note: Credited as "Editorial Consultant".)
- Production companies: The Pando Company; Raybert Productions
- Distributed by: Columbia Pictures
- Release dates: May 12, 1969 (Cannes); July 14, 1969 (New York City)
- Running time: 96 minutes
- Country: United States
- Language: English
- Budget: $360,000–400,000
- Box office: $60 million

Easy Rider is a 1969 American road drama film written by Peter Fonda, Dennis Hopper, and Terry Southern, produced by Fonda and directed by Hopper. Fonda and Hopper play two bikers who travel through the American Southwest and the South, carrying money made from a cocaine deal. Other actors in the film include Jack Nicholson, Karen Black, and Toni Basil. The success of Easy Rider helped spark the New Hollywood era of filmmaking during the early 1970s.

Easy Rider was a landmark counterculture film and a "touchstone for a generation" that "captured the national imagination" and "mood of the drug culture" at the time. It explores the youth culture in the United States during the 1960s, including the rise of the hippie movement, drug use, and communal lifestyle. Real drugs were used in scenes showing the use of marijuana and other substances.

An independent production, the film was released by Columbia Pictures on July 14, 1969, and earned $60 million worldwide compared to a modest filming budget of $400,000. Critics have praised the performances, directing, writing, soundtrack, and visuals. It received two Academy Awards nominations for Best Original Screenplay and Best Supporting Actor (Jack Nicholson). In 1998, the film was selected for preservation in the United States National Film Registry by the Library of Congress as being "culturally, historically, or aesthetically significant".

== Plot ==
Wyatt (Fonda) and Billy (Hopper) are freewheeling motorcyclists. After smuggling cocaine from Mexico to Los Angeles, they sell their haul to Connection (Spector) and receive a large sum of money. With the cash stuffed into a plastic tube hidden inside the Stars & Stripes-painted fuel tank of Wyatt's California-style chopper (motorcycle), they ride eastward, aiming to reach New Orleans in time for the Mardi Gras festival.

During their trip, Wyatt and Billy stop to repair a flat tire on Wyatt's bike at a farmstead in Arizona and have a meal with the farmer and his family. Later, Wyatt picks up a hippie hitchhiker, and he invites them to visit his commune, where they stay for the rest of the day. "Free love" appears to be practiced, with two of the women, Lisa and Sarah, seemingly sharing the affections of the hitchhiking commune member before turning their attention to Wyatt and Billy. As the bikers leave, the hitchhiker gives Wyatt some LSD for him to share with "the right people, at the right time".

Later while riding along with a parade in New Mexico, the pair are arrested for "parading without a permit" and thrown in jail. There, they befriend lawyer George Hanson (Nicholson), who has spent the night in jail after overindulging in alcohol. Mentioning that he has done work for the ACLU, George helps them get out of jail and decides to travel with Wyatt and Billy to New Orleans. As they camp that night, Wyatt and Billy introduce George to marijuana. As an alcoholic and a "square", George is reluctant to try it due to his fear of becoming "hooked" and it leading to worse drugs, but quickly relents.

Stopping to eat at a small-town Louisiana diner, the trio attracts the attention of the locals. The girls in the restaurant think they are exciting, but the local men, including the sheriff, make denigrating comments and taunts. Wyatt, Billy, and George decide to leave without any fuss. They make camp outside town. In the middle of the night, a group of locals attack the sleeping trio, beating them with clubs. Billy screams and brandishes a knife, and the attackers leave. Wyatt and Billy suffer minor injuries, but George has been bludgeoned to death. Wyatt and Billy wrap George's body in his sleeping bag, gather his belongings, and vow to return the items to his family.

They continue to New Orleans and find a brothel George had told them about. Taking prostitutes Karen and Mary with them, Wyatt and Billy wander the parade-filled streets of the Mardi Gras celebration. They end up in a French Quarter cemetery, where all four ingest the LSD the hitchhiker had given to Wyatt. Later at their campsite, while Billy enthusiastically recounts their travels, Wyatt melancholically muses that they "blew it" in their quest.

The next morning, as they are overtaken on a two-lane country road by two local men in an older pickup truck, the passenger in the truck reaches for a shotgun, saying he will scare them. As they pass Billy, the passenger fires, and Billy has a lowside crash. The truck passes Wyatt, who has stopped, and Wyatt rides back to Billy, finding him lying flat on the side of the road and covered in blood. Wyatt tells Billy he is going to get help and covers Billy's wound with his own leather jacket. Wyatt then rides down the road toward the pickup as it makes a U-turn. Passing in the opposite direction, the passenger fires the shotgun again, this time through the driver's-side window. Wyatt's riderless motorcycle flies through the air and comes apart before landing and being engulfed in flames. His body is seen lying still in the background. A final shot sees the motorcycle burning and the credits roll over the scene.

== Cast ==
- Peter Fonda as Wyatt, "Captain America"
- Dennis Hopper as Billy
- Jack Nicholson as George Hanson
- Luke Askew as Stranger on Highway
- Phil Spector as Connection
- Karen Black as Karen
- Toni Basil as Mary
- Antonio Mendoza as Jesus
- Mac Mashourian as Bodyguard
- Warren Finnerty as Rancher
- Tita Colorado as Rancher's Wife
- Luana Anders as Lisa
- Sabrina Scharf as Sarah
- Robert Walker Jr. as Jack
- Sandy Brown Wyeth as Joanne

== Production ==
=== Writing ===
Hopper and Fonda's first collaboration was in The Trip (1967), written by Jack Nicholson, which had themes and characters similar to those of Easy Rider. Peter Fonda had become "an icon of the counterculture" in The Wild Angels (1966), where he established "a persona he would develop further in The Trip and Easy Rider." The Trip also popularized LSD, while Easy Rider went on to "celebrate '60s counterculture" but does so "stripped of its innocence." Author Katie Mills said that The Trip is a way point along the "metamorphosis of the rebel road story from a Beat relic into its hippie reincarnation as Easy Rider", and connected Peter Fonda's characters in those two films, along with his character in The Wild Angels, deviating from the "formulaic biker" persona and critiquing "commodity-oriented filmmakers appropriating avant-garde film techniques." It was also a step in the transition from independent film into Hollywood's mainstream, and while The Trip was criticized as a faux, popularized underground film made by Hollywood insiders, Easy Rider "interrogates" the attitude that underground film must "remain strictly segregated from Hollywood." Mills also wrote that the famous acid trip scene in Easy Rider "clearly derives from their first tentative explorations as filmmakers in The Trip." The Trip and The Wild Angels had been low-budget films released by American International Pictures and were both successful. When Fonda took Easy Rider to AIP, however, as it was Hopper's first film as director, they wanted to be able to replace him if the film went overbudget, so Fonda took the film to Bert Schneider of Raybert Productions and Columbia Pictures instead.

When seeing a still of himself and Bruce Dern in The Wild Angels, Peter Fonda had the idea of a modern Western, involving two bikers traveling across the country after a drug sale. He called Dennis Hopper, and the two decided to turn that into a movie, The Loners, with Hopper directing, Fonda producing, and both starring and writing. Back in LA, Fonda introduced Hopper to Cliff Vaughs, who Peter had met after his second arrest for marijuana in 1967, when Cliff interviewed Peter for radio station KRLA. Over multiple meetings, Vaughs provided his experiences riding a chopper through the South while working on civil rights with the SNCC in 1963–1965, including being shot at by two duck hunters in a pickup while he was riding his chopper with Iris Greenburg on the back, between Jackson and Little Rock. Vaughs had a handmade poster on his living room wall with collaged letters spelling 'Where has my easy rider gone?' atop a poster from the Mae West film She Done Him Wrong. Vaughs was made Associate Producer of the film, and designed/built the two choppers, with the assistance of Ben Hardy and Larry Marcus. Fonda and Hopper later brought in screenwriter Terry Southern. The film was mostly shot without a screenplay, with ad-libbed lines, and production started with only the outline and the names of the protagonists. Keeping the Western theme, Wyatt was named after Wyatt Earp and Billy after Billy the Kid. However, Southern disputed that Hopper wrote much of the script. In an interview published in 2016 [Southern died in 1995] he said, "You know if Den Hopper improvises a dozen lines and six of them survive the cutting room floor he'll put in for screenplay credit. Now it would be almost impossible to exaggerate his contribution to the film—but, by George, he manages to do it every time." According to Southern, Fonda was under contract to produce a motorcycle film with A.I.P., which Fonda had agreed to allow Hopper to direct. According to Southern, Fonda and Hopper didn't seek screenplay credit until after the first screenings of the film, which required Southern's agreement due to writers guild policies. Southern says he agreed out of a sense of camaraderie, and that Hopper later took credit for the entire script.

According to Terry Southern's biographer, Lee Hill, the part of George Hanson had been written for Southern's friend, actor Rip Torn. When Torn met with Hopper and Fonda at a New York restaurant in early 1968 to discuss the role, Hopper began ranting about the "rednecks" he had encountered on his scouting trip to the South. Torn, a Texan, took exception to some of Hopper's remarks, and the two almost came to blows, as a result of which Torn withdrew from the project. Torn was replaced by Jack Nicholson. In 1994, Jay Leno interviewed Hopper about Easy Rider on The Tonight Show, and during the interview, Hopper falsely claimed that Torn had pulled a knife on him during the altercation when it was actually the other way around. This infuriated Torn, so he sued Hopper for defamation seeking punitive damages. Torn ultimately prevailed against Hopper on all counts.

=== Filming ===
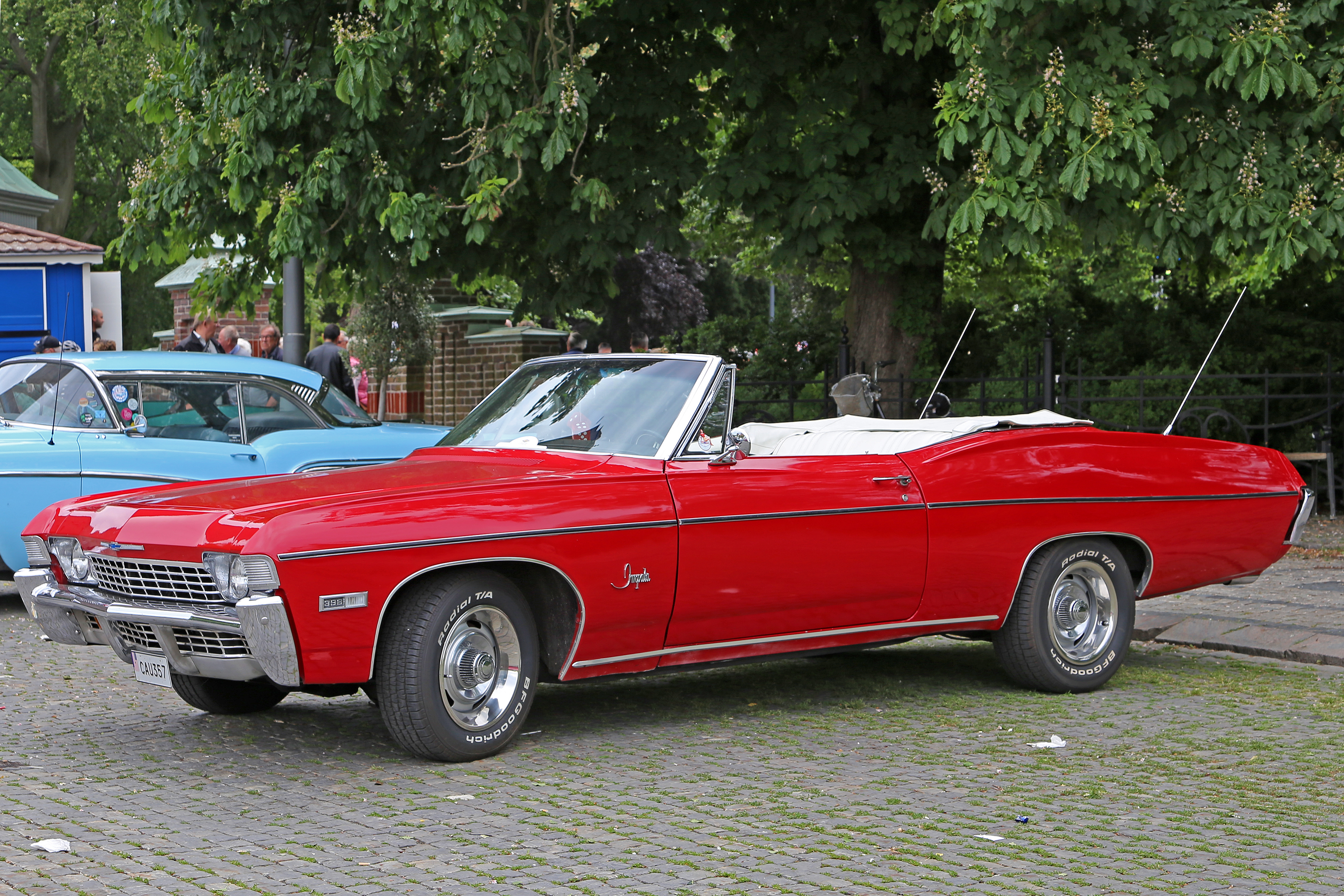
A 1968 Chevy Impala convertible like this was used for filming

The filming budget of Easy Rider was $360,000 to $400,000 ($2.42 million to $2.69 million in 2025). Peter Fonda said that on top of this, he personally paid for the costs of travel and lodging for the crew, saying, "Everybody was taking my credit cards and would pay for all the hotels, the food, the gas, everything with Diner's Club". Cinematographer Laszlo Kovacs said that an additional $1 million, "about three times the budget for shooting the rest of the film" was spent on the licensed music tracks that were added during the editing. He already had made two outlaw biker films and suggested that a 1968 Chevy Impala convertible be purchased to carry his camera smoothly, with speeds not exceeding 25 mph (40 km/h).

According to associate producer Bill Hayward in interviews included as part of the bonus DVD feature, "Shaking the Cage", Hopper was difficult on set. During test shooting on location in New Orleans, with documentary filmmaker Baird Bryant on camera, Hopper fought with the production's ad hoc crew for control. At one point, a paranoid Hopper demanded camera operator Barry Feinstein hand over the footage he shot that day so he could keep it safe with him in his hotel room. Enraged, Feinstein hurled the film cans at Hopper and the two got into a physical confrontation. After this turmoil, Hopper and Fonda decided to assemble a proper crew for the rest of the film. Consequently, the rest of the film was shot on 35mm film, while the New Orleans sequences were shot on 16mm film. The hippie commune was recreated from pictures and shot at a site overlooking Malibu Canyon on Piuma Canyon Road, since the New Buffalo commune in Arroyo Hondo near Taos, New Mexico, did not permit shooting there. Among the extras who appear in the sequence are actors Dan Haggerty and Carrie Snodgress, musician Jim Sullivan, and Fonda's daughter Bridget.

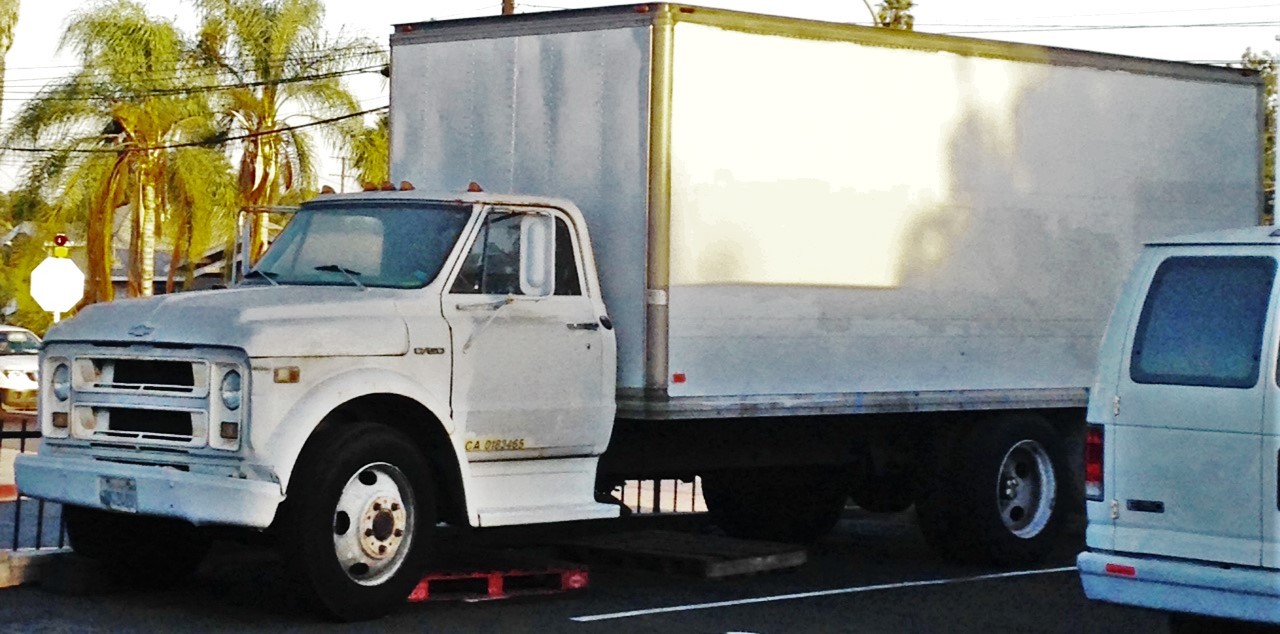
Five-ton trucks with box and liftgate, similar to this Chevy C-50, were used for motorbikes and filming equipment

A short clip near the beginning of the film shows Wyatt and Billy on Route 66 in Flagstaff, Arizona, passing a large figure of a lumberjack. That lumberjack statue—once situated in front of the Lumberjack Café—remains in Flagstaff, but now stands inside the J. Lawrence Walkup Skydome on the campus of Northern Arizona University. A second, very similar statue was also moved from the Lumberjack Café to the exterior of the Skydome. Most of the film is shot outside with natural lighting. Hopper said all the outdoor shooting was an intentional choice on his part, because "God is a great gaffer." Besides the camera car, the production used two five-ton trucks, one for the equipment and pulling an 750 Amp generator trailer, and one for the up to four motorcycles, with the cast and crew in a motor home. One of the locations was Monument Valley.

The restaurant scenes with Fonda, Hopper, and Nicholson were shot in Morganza, Louisiana. The men and girls in the scenes were Morganza locals. In order to inspire more vitriolic commentary from the local men, Hopper told them the characters of Billy, Wyatt, and George had raped and killed a girl outside of town. The scene in which Billy and Wyatt were shot was filmed on Louisiana Highway 105 North, just outside Krotz Springs, and the two men in the pickup truck—Johnny David and D.C. Billodeau—were Krotz Springs locals.

While shooting the cemetery scene, Hopper tried to convince Fonda to talk to the statue of the Madonna as though it were Fonda's mother, who had taken her own life when he was 10, and ask her why she left him. Although Fonda was reluctant, he eventually complied. Later Fonda used the inclusion of this scene, along with the concluding scene, as leverage to persuade Bob Dylan to allow the use of Roger McGuinn's cover of "It's Alright, Ma (I'm Only Bleeding)".

=== Post-production ===
Despite being filmed in the first half of 1968, roughly between Mardi Gras and the assassination of Robert F. Kennedy, with production starting on February 22, the film did not have a U.S. premiere until July 1969, after having won an award at the Cannes film festival in May. The delay was partially due to a protracted editing process. Inspired by 2001: A Space Odyssey, one of Hopper's proposed cuts was 220 minutes long, including extensive use of the "flash-forward" narrative device, wherein scenes from later in the movie are inserted into the current scene. Only one flash-forward survives in the final edit: when Wyatt in the New Orleans brothel has a premonition of the final scene. At the request of Bob Rafelson and Bert Schneider, Henry Jaglom was brought in to edit the film into its current form, while Schneider purchased a trip to Taos for Hopper so he wouldn't interfere with the recut. Upon seeing the final cut, Hopper was originally displeased, saying that his movie was "turned into a TV show," but he eventually accepted, claiming that Jaglom had crafted the film the way he had originally intended. Despite the large part he played in shaping the film, Jaglom only received credit as an "Editorial Consultant."

It is unclear what the exact running time of the original rough cut of the movie was: four hours, four and a half hours, or five hours. In 1992, the film's producers, Schneider and Rafelson, sued Columbia Pictures over missing negatives, edit footage and damaged prints, holding them negligent concerning these assets. Some of the scenes which were in the original cut but were deleted are:

- The original opening showing Wyatt and Billy performing in a Los Angeles stunt show (their real jobs)
- Wyatt and Billy being ripped off by the promoter
- Wyatt and Billy getting in a biker fight
- Wyatt and Billy picking up women at a drive-in
- Wyatt and Billy cruising to and escaping from Mexico to score the cocaine they sell
- An elaborate police and helicopter chase that took place at the beginning after the dope deal with police chasing Wyatt and Billy over mountains and across the Mexican border
- The road trip out of L.A. edited to the full length of Steppenwolf's "Born to Be Wild" with billboards along the way offering wry commentary
- Wyatt and Billy being pulled over by a cop while riding their motorcycles across a highway
- Wyatt and Billy encountering a black motorcycle gang
- Ten additional minutes for the volatile café scene in Louisiana where George deftly keeps the peace
- Wyatt and Billy checking into a hotel before going over to Madam Tinkertoy's
- An extended and much longer Madam Tinkertoy sequence
- Extended versions of all the campfire scenes, including the enigmatic finale in which Wyatt says, "We blew it, Billy."

Easy Rider's style—the jump cuts, time shifts, flash forwards, flashbacks, jerky hand-held cameras, fractured narrative and improvised acting—can be seen as a cinematic translation of the psychedelic experience. Peter Biskind, author of Easy Riders, Raging Bulls wrote, "LSD did create a frame of mind that fractured experience and that LSD experience had an effect on films like Easy Rider."

== Motorcycles ==
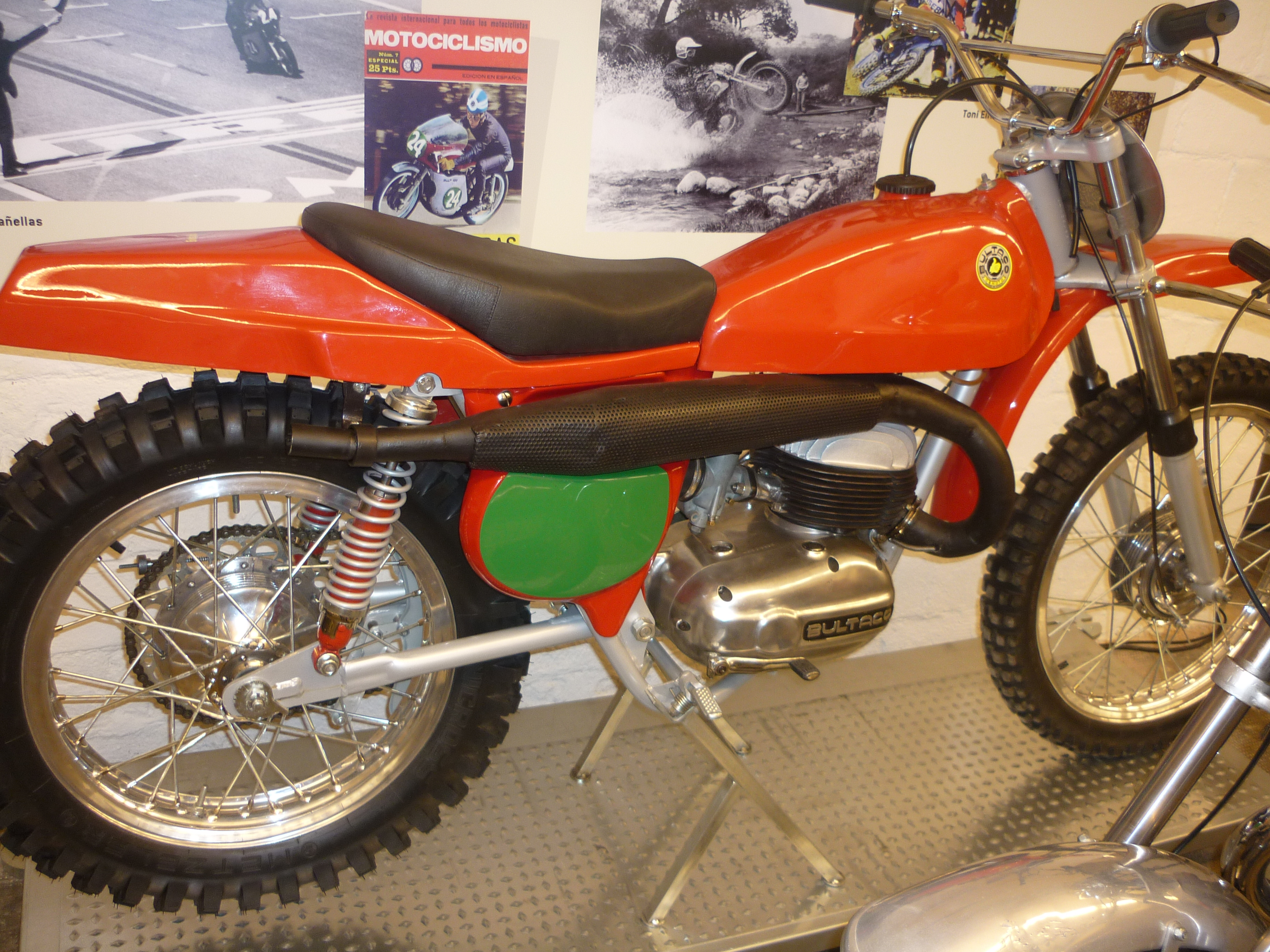
Bultaco Pursang

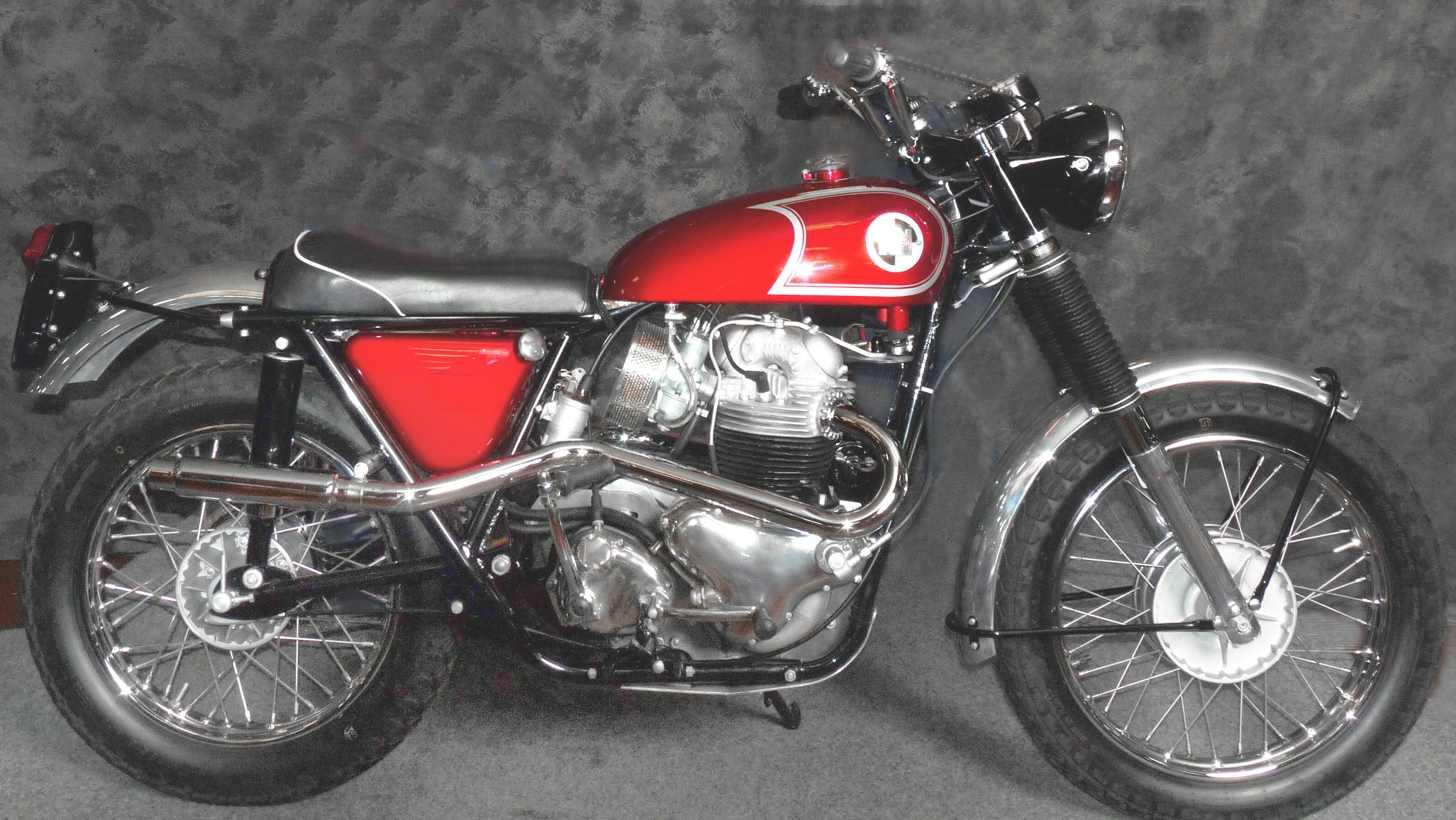
Norton P11 Ranger

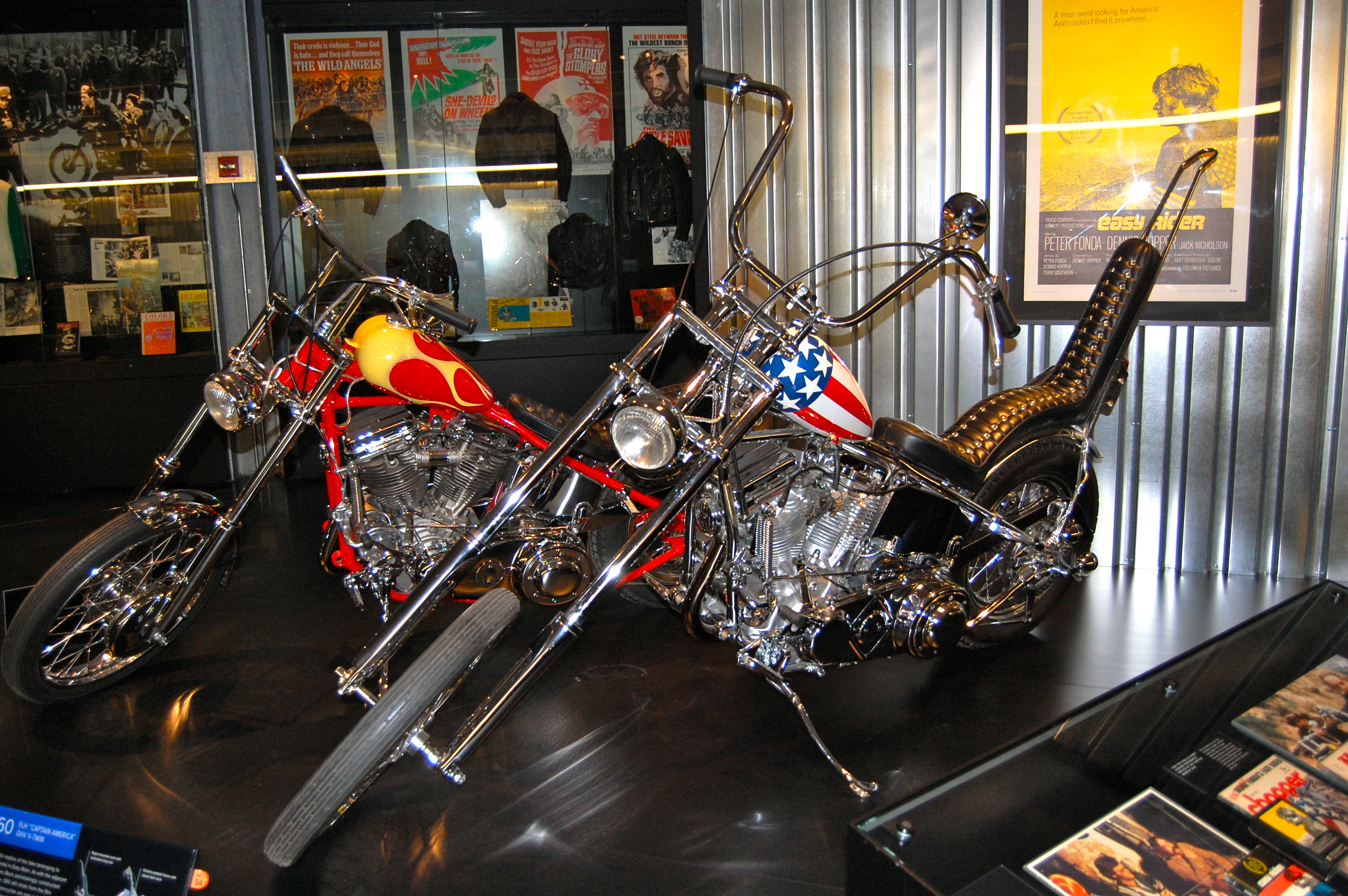
Replicas of the Captain America bike and Billy Bike at the Harley-Davidson Museum in Milwaukee

While Easy Rider is famous for the Harley-Davidson choppers, the movie actually begins with the characters riding two European-made dirt bikes, Fonda on a red Bultaco Pursang, Hopper on Norton P11 Ranger. In total, two dirt bikes, and four former police bikes were used in the film. The 1949, 1950 and 1952 Harley-Davidson FL Hydra-Glide bikes were purchased at an auction for $500, equivalent to about $4800 in 2025. Each bike had a backup to make sure that shooting could continue in case one of the old machines failed or got wrecked accidentally. The main motorcycles for the film, based on hardtail frames and panhead engines, were designed and built by two African American chopper builders—Cliff Vaughs and Ben Hardy—reflecting chopper designs popular among Black motorcyclists at the time, and following ideas of Peter Fonda, and were handled by Tex Hall and Dan Haggerty during shooting. Cliff Vaughs and Ben Hardy were not mentioned in the movie credits.

One "Captain America" was demolished in the final scene, while the other three were stolen and probably taken apart before their significance as movie props became known. The demolished bike was rebuilt by Dan Haggerty and offered for auction in October 2014 by Profiles in History, a Calabasas, California-based auction house with an estimated value of $1–1.2 million. The provenance of existing Captain America motorcycles is unclear, and has been the subject of much litigation. The EMP Museum in Seattle identified a Captain America chopper displayed there as a rebuilt original movie prop. Many replicas have been made since the film's release, including examples at the Deutsches Zweirad- und NSU-Museum (Germany), National Motorcycle Museum (Iowa), Barber Vintage Motorsports Museum (Alabama), and Harley-Davidson Museum (Milwaukee).

Hopper and Fonda hosted a wrap party for the movie and then realized they had not yet shot the final campfire scene. Thus, it was shot after the bikes had already been stolen, which is why they are not visible in the background as in the other campfire scenes.

== Reception and legacy ==
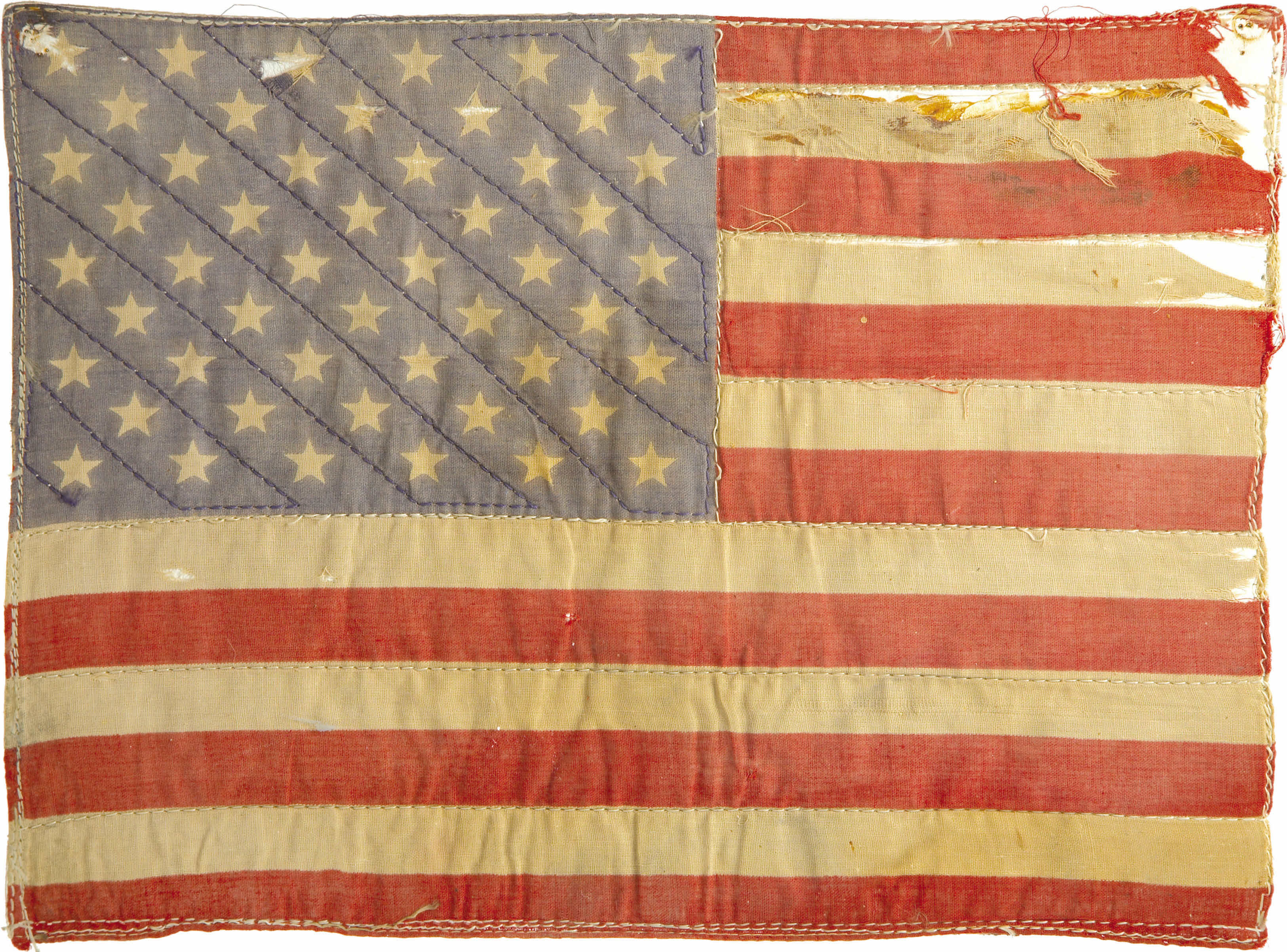
Peter Fonda's American Flag patch, which sold for $89,625 in 2007

=== Critical reception ===
The film received mostly positive reviews from critics. Vincent Canby of The New York Times called it "pretty but lower case cinema" despite the "upper case" "pious statement about our society which is sick". He was mildly impressed by the photography, rock score and Nicholson's performance. Penelope Gilliatt in The New Yorker said that it "speaks tersely and aptly for this American age, that is both the best of times and the worst of times."

Roger Ebert added Easy Rider to his "Great Movies" list in 2004. Easy Rider holds an 84% rating on Rotten Tomatoes based on 56 reviews, with an average rating of 7.70/10. The site's consensus says, "Edgy and seminal, Easy Rider encapsulates the dreams, hopes, and hopelessness of 1960s counterculture." Metacritic, which uses a weighted average, assigned the film a score of 85 out of 100, based on 18 critics, indicating "universal acclaim".

=== Box office ===
The film opened on July 14, 1969, at the Beekman theater in New York City, and grossed a house record of $40,422 ($272,000 in 2025) in its first week. It grossed even more the following week with $46,609. In its 14th week of release, it was the number one film at the U.S. box office and remained there for three weeks. It was the fourth highest-grossing film of 1969, with a worldwide gross of $60 million ($403 million in 2025), including $41.7 million domestically in the U.S. and Canada.

=== Accolades ===
| Award | Category | Nominee(s) | Result |
|---|---|---|---|
| Academy Awards | Best Supporting Actor | Jack Nicholson | Nominated |
| Academy Awards | Best Original Screenplay | Peter Fonda, Dennis Hopper and Terry Southern | Nominated |
| British Academy Film Awards | Best Actor in a Supporting Role | Jack Nicholson | Nominated |
| Cannes Film Festival | Palme d'Or | Dennis Hopper | Nominated |
| Cannes Film Festival | Best First Work | Dennis Hopper | Won |
| Directors Guild of America Awards | Outstanding Directorial Achievement in Motion Pictures | Dennis Hopper | Nominated |
| Golden Globe Awards | Best Supporting Actor – Motion Picture | Jack Nicholson | Nominated |
| Kansas City Film Circle Critics Awards | Best Supporting Actor | Jack Nicholson | Won |
| Kinema Junpo Awards | Best Foreign Language Film | Dennis Hopper | Won |
| Laurel Awards | Best Drama | | 5th Place |
| Laurel Awards | Top Male Supporting Performance | Jack Nicholson | Won |
| Laurel Awards | Top Cinematographer | László Kovács | Nominated |
| Laurel Awards | Male New Face | Peter Fonda | Nominated |
| Laurel Awards | Male New Face | Dennis Hopper | 5th Place |
| National Film Preservation Board | National Film Registry | | Inducted |
| National Society of Film Critics Awards | Best Supporting Actor | Jack Nicholson | Won |
| National Society of Film Critics Awards | Special Award | Dennis Hopper ("For his achievements as director, co-writer and co-star.") | Won |
| New York Film Critics Circle Awards | Best Supporting Actor | Jack Nicholson | Won |
| Satellite Awards | Best Classic DVD | | Nominated |
| Satellite Awards | Best DVD Extras | | Nominated |
| Satellite Awards | Outstanding Overall DVD | | Nominated |
| Writers Guild of America Awards | Best Drama Written Directly for the Screen | Peter Fonda, Dennis Hopper and Terry Southern | Nominated |

In 1998, Easy Rider was added to the United States National Film Registry, having been deemed "culturally, historically, or aesthetically significant."

In April 2019, a restored version of the film was selected to be shown in the Cannes Classics section at the 2019 Cannes Film Festival.

American Film Institute Lists

- AFI's 100 Years...100 Movies – #88
- AFI's 100 Years...100 Songs: "Born to Be Wild" – #29
- AFI's 100 Years...100 Movies (10th Anniversary Edition) – #84

=== Significance ===
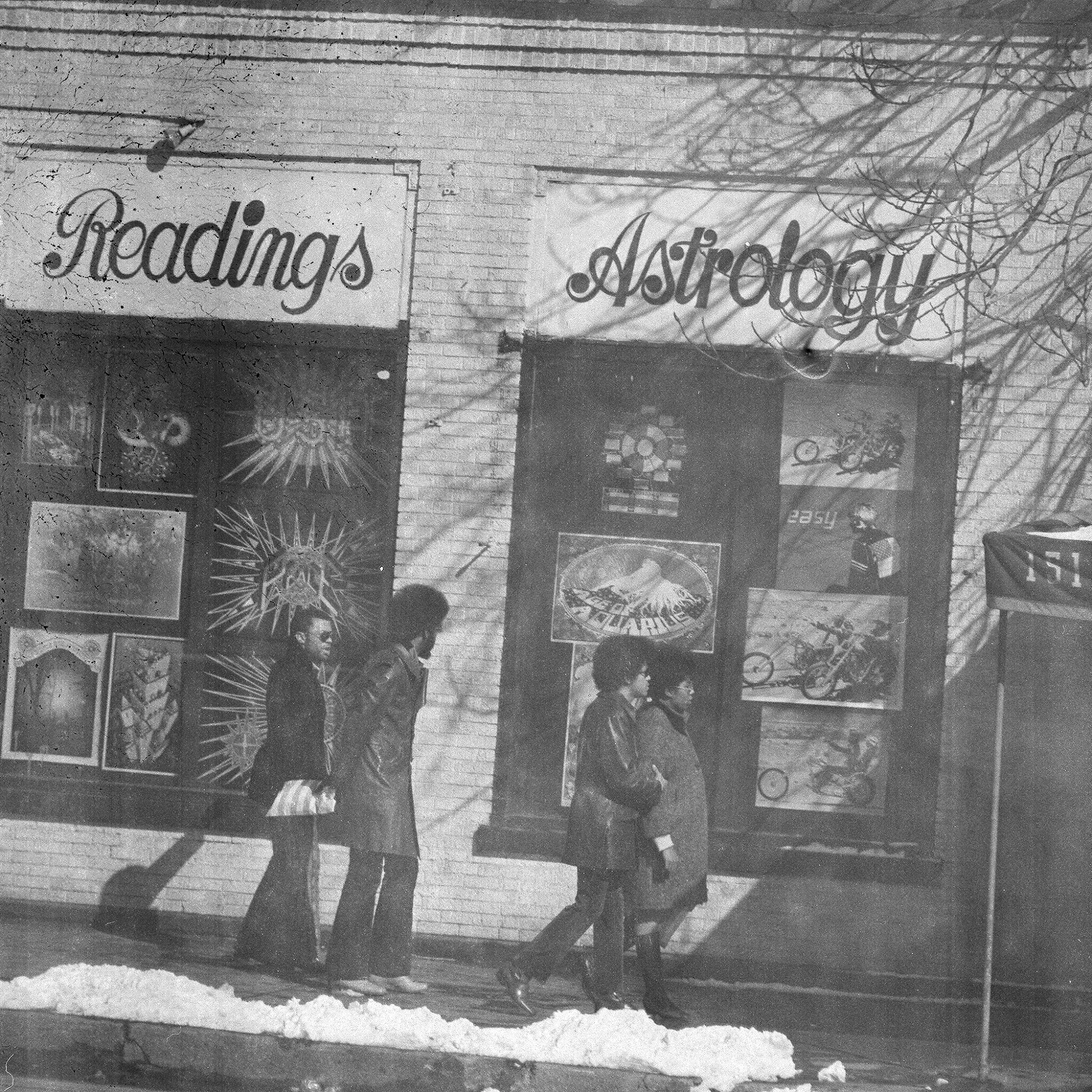
Posters of Peter Fonda on his motorcycle from Easy Rider for sale in a store in Chicago circa 1970.

Along with Bonnie and Clyde and The Graduate, Easy Rider helped kick-start the New Hollywood era during the late 1960s and 1970s. The major studios realized that money could be made from low-budget films made by avant-garde directors. Heavily influenced by the French New Wave, the films of the so-called "post-classical Hollywood" came to represent a counterculture generation increasingly disillusioned with its government as well as the government's effects on the world at large and the establishment in general. Although Jack Nicholson appears only as a supporting actor and in the last half of the film, the standout performance signaled his arrival as a movie star, along with his subsequent film Five Easy Pieces in which he had the lead role. Vice President Spiro Agnew criticized Easy Rider, along with the band Jefferson Airplane, as examples of the permissiveness of the 1960s counterculture.

The film's success, and the new era of Hollywood which it helped usher in, gave Hopper the chance to direct again with complete artistic control. The result was 1971's The Last Movie, which was a notable box office and critical failure, effectively ending Hopper's career as a director for well over a decade.

It also gave Fonda the chance to direct with The Hired Hand, although he rarely produced again.

== Music ==
The movie was financed with money made from the Monkees, and features a cameo of record producer Phil Spector in the opening scenes, but neither provided any music. The "groundbreaking" soundtrack featured popular rock artists including the Band, the Byrds, the Jimi Hendrix Experience, and Steppenwolf. Editor and negative cutter Donn Cambern used various music from his own record collection to make watching up to 80 hours of bike footage more interesting during editing. Most of Cambern's music was used, with licensing costs of $1 million, triple the film's budget. The film's extensive use of pop and rock music for the soundtrack was similar to what had recently been used for 1967's The Graduate, including songs being used more than once, or being adapted for the movie.

Bob Dylan was asked to contribute music, but was reluctant to use his own recording of "It's Alright, Ma (I'm Only Bleeding)", so a version performed by Byrds frontman Roger McGuinn was used instead. Also, instead of writing an entirely new song for the film, Dylan simply wrote out the first verse of "Ballad of Easy Rider" and told the filmmakers, "Give this to McGuinn, he'll know what to do with it." McGuinn completed the song and performed it in the film.

Originally, Peter Fonda had intended the band Crosby, Stills, Nash, & Young to write an entirely original soundtrack for the film, but this failed to materialize for two reasons. For one, Cambern edited the footage much more closely to what were only meant as temporary tracks than was customary at the time, which led to everyone involved finding them much more suited to the material than they had originally thought. Also, upon watching a screening of the film with Cambern's edits, the group felt they could not improve on the music that was used. On the other hand, Hopper increasingly got control over every aspect over the course of the project and decided to throw CSNY out behind Fonda's back, telling the band as an excuse, "Look, you guys are really good musicians, but honestly, anybody who rides in a limo can't comprehend my movie, so I'm gonna have to say no to this, and if you guys try to get in the studio again, I may have to cause you some bodily harm."

Inspired by the movie, Hendrix later wrote a song "Ezy Ryder", with lyrics reflecting the film's themes, while Iron Butterfly wrote "Easy Rider (Let the Wind Pay the Way)".

== Home media ==
The film was first released to DVD on December 7, 1999, as a special edition from Columbia Pictures. Special features included an audio commentary track with Dennis Hopper; the documentary Easy Rider: Shaking the Cage (1999); production notes; and new interviews with Peter Fonda and Hopper. It received a Blu-ray release on October 20, 2009.

In November 2010, the film was digitally remastered and released by The Criterion Collection as part of the box set America Lost and Found: The BBS Story. It included features from previous DVD releases; the documentary Born to Be Wild (1995); television excerpts showing Hopper and Fonda at the Cannes Film Festival; and a new video interview with BBS co-founder Stephen Blauner. On November 23, 2014, a Blu-ray SteelBook was released. On May 3, 2016, Criterion re-released Easy Rider as a 2-disc collection.

== Sequel ==
In 2012, a sequel to the movie was released, titled Easy Rider: The Ride Back and directed by Dustin Rikert. The film is about the family of Wyatt "Captain America" Williams from the 1940s to the present day. No members of the original cast or crew were involved with the film, which was produced and written by amateur filmmaker Phil Pitzer, who had purchased the sequel rights to Easy Rider. Pitzer pursued legal action against Bob Rafelson and Bert Schneider to block them from reclaiming the rights to the film.

== See also ==
- List of American films of 1969
- List of films featuring hallucinogens
- American Dream
- Hippie exploitation films
- Method acting
- Outlaw biker film
- List of films related to the hippie subculture
