= Clifford Vaughs =

American civil rights activist (1937–2016)

Photograph by Danny Lyon of Clifford Vaughs arrested by the National Guard at a Student Nonviolent Coordinating Committee (SNCC) protest in Cambridge, Maryland in 1964. In foreground, Stokely Carmichael pulls Vaughs' right leg from Guardsmen.

Clifford A. "Sonny" Vaughs (April 16, 1937 – July 2, 2016) was an American civil rights activist, filmmaker, and motorcycle builder. Vaughs designed the two chopper motorcycles used for the 1969 film Easy Rider, while an associate producer on the film. He also produced and directed the documentary What Will the Harvest Be? (1965) and Not So Easy (1972).

== Early life ==
Vaughs was born in Boston, Massachusetts, the only child of an unmarried mother. He was educated at the Boston Latin School, and studied at Boston University. He joined the Marine Corps in 1953, and afterward studied at the University of Mexico, in Mexico City, in Latin American Studies. He moved to Los Angeles in 1961, where he became involved in the custom motorcycle scene, and rode several Harley-Davidson 'Knucklehead' 'choppers'. In 1963, Vaughs was recruited to join the Student Nonviolent Coordinating Committee (SNCC) by Bob Zelner, while on a fundraising tour for the organization. Vaughs drove his 1953 Chevrolet half-ton pickup truck to the East Coast to join the SNCC activities there. He had a dual role in the SNCC, as Field Coordinator in Jackson, Mississippi, and as a staff photographer. He was photographed by Danny Lyon being bodily dragged by five National Guard troops at a sit-in in Cambridge, Maryland, on May 2, 1964. It was during this violent period of SNCC demonstrations that Vaughs first met Lyon. Activist Stokely Carmichael appears in the foreground of the photo, pulling Vaughs' right leg from Guardsmen.

Vaughs carried his customized blue Knucklehead chopper in the bed of his pickup truck to Alabama in 1964, and rode the motorcycle to visit sharecroppers in remote areas. Vaughs said, "I may have been naïve thinking I could be an example to the black folks who were living in the South, but that's why I rode my chopper in Alabama. I'd visit people in their dirt-floor shacks, living like slavery had never ended. I wanted to be a visible example to them; a free black man on my motorcycle."

In 1964, Vaughs and Lew Irwin drove to Lowndes County AK to film interviews with Martin Luther King Jr, Stokeley Carmichael, and Julian Bond, among others, on the rise of the Black Power movement in the US. The resulting documentary was 'What Will the Harvest Be?', which was aired in 1965 on ABC-TV. Vaughs was denied entry into the cameraman's union while working at KABC, and sued successfully to break the 'color barrier' for union membership.

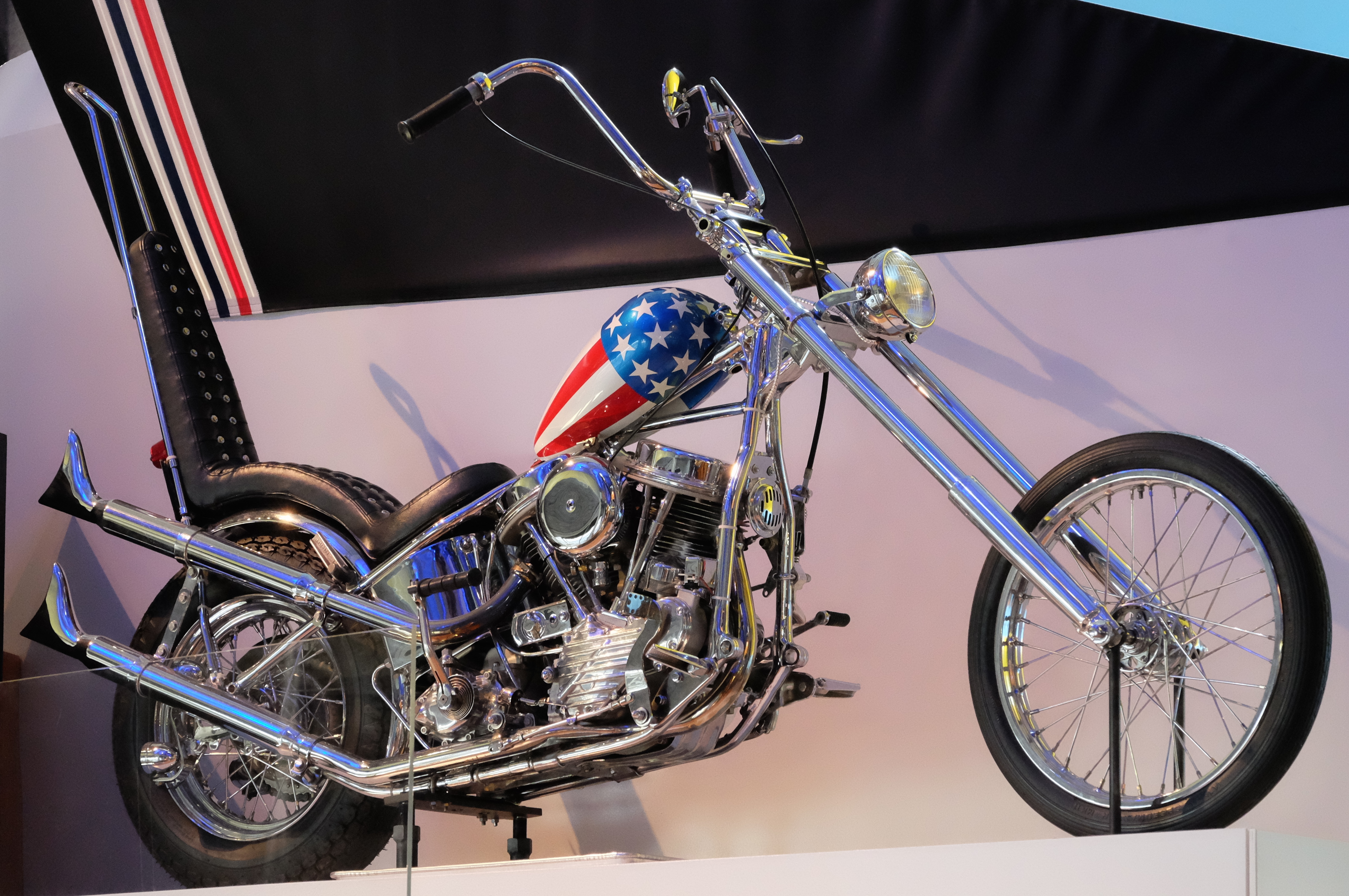
The Captain America bike

The Credibility Gap grew out of a company formed by Lew Irwin and Vaughs, 'Irwin-Vaughs Productions'.

== Motorcycles ==
In 1967, while working at KABC in Los Angeles, Vaughs interviewed Peter Fonda. Vaughs and Fonda shared an interest in motorcycles, and Fonda introduced Vaughs to Dennis Hopper, which led Vaughs to join a new film project as Associate Producer, a "Western type movie with motorcycles". Vaughs claims to have come up with the name for the film, 'Easy Rider', after the Mae West song, I Wonder Where My Easy Rider's Gone?

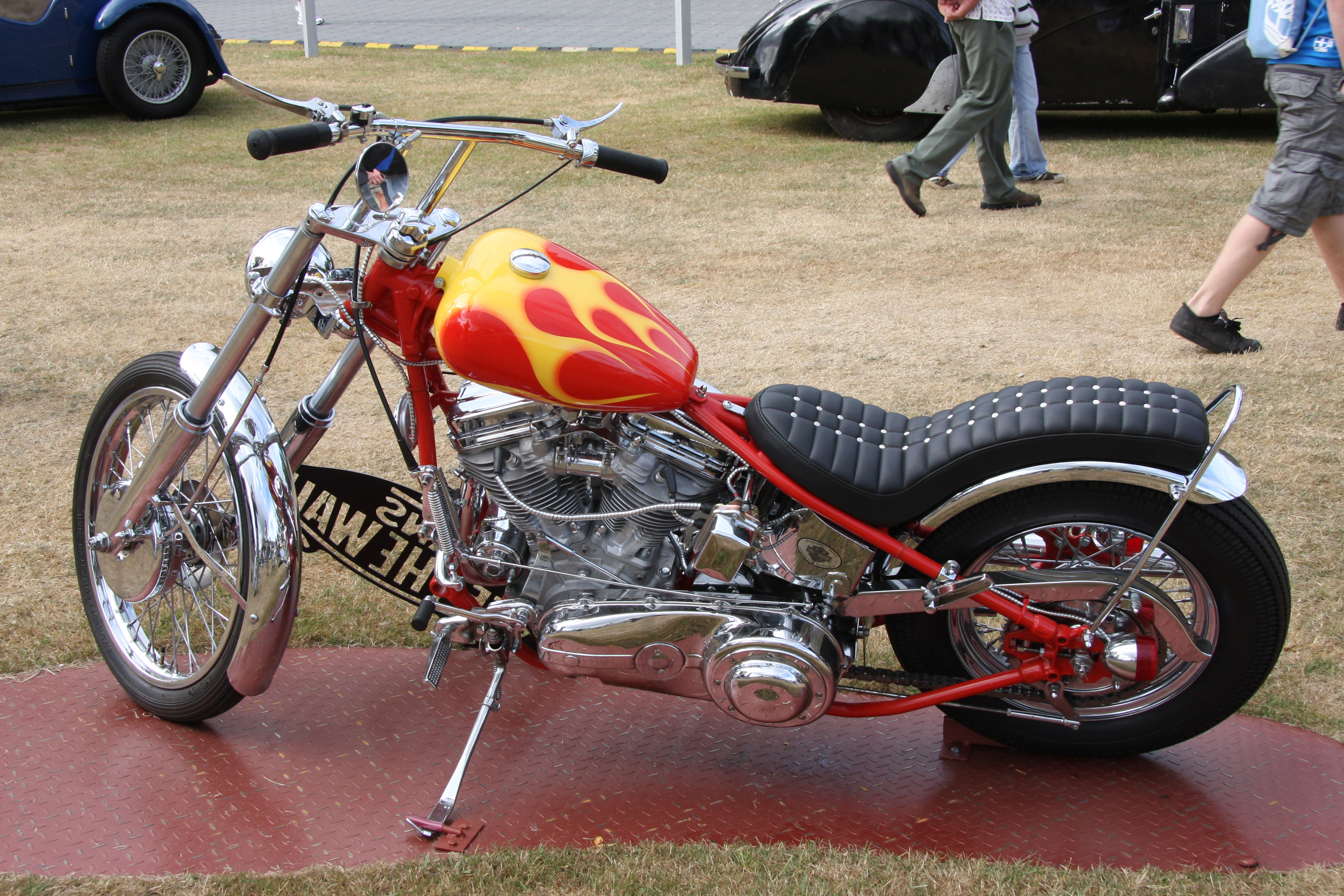
The Billy bike

Vaughs purchased four Harley-Davidson 'Panhead' motorcycles at an LA County Sheriff's auction in 1967, and coordinated with motorcycle shop owner Ben Hardy, and mechanic Larry Marcus, to create the 'Captain America' and 'Billy' choppers for the film. Two 'hero' choppers were built, and two stunt doubles for the ending scenes of the movie; while the stunt Captain America was destroyed in filming the final scene of the movie, the remaining three motorcycles were apparently stolen, and never recovered. First-time director Dennis Hopper consumed the limited budget for 'Easy Rider' very quickly, and Columbia Pictures invested in the movie to finish it. At this juncture, Cliff Vaughs, and most other crew members, were fired, and a new crew hired. As part of a legal settlement for leaving as associate producer, Vaughs' contribution to the film, including the creation of the iconic motorcycles, was not included in the film's credits.

In 1972, Vaughs produced and directed the motorcycle safety film 'Not So Easy', which featured Peter Fonda, Evel Knievel, and the LAPD motorcycles drill team on Harley-Davidsons. Vaughs himself was riding in scenes on freeways, his wife Wendy in urban settings. Harley-Davidson provided the motorbikes, Fonda rode a Sparkling Green FX Super Glide.

In 1976, Vaughs left the United States to live on a boat in the Gulf of Mexico. In 2009, Vaughs was credited publicly for the first time as creator of the 'Easy Rider' choppers on the Jesse James Discovery Channel television series, the 'History of the Chopper'. Vaughs, a longstanding member of the L.A. chapter of the Chosen Few MC, died on July 2, 2016, after losing consciousness and falling. He was 79.
