= Deutsches Zweirad- und NSU-Museum =

Museum in Germany

Coordinates: 49°11′30″N 9°13′21″E

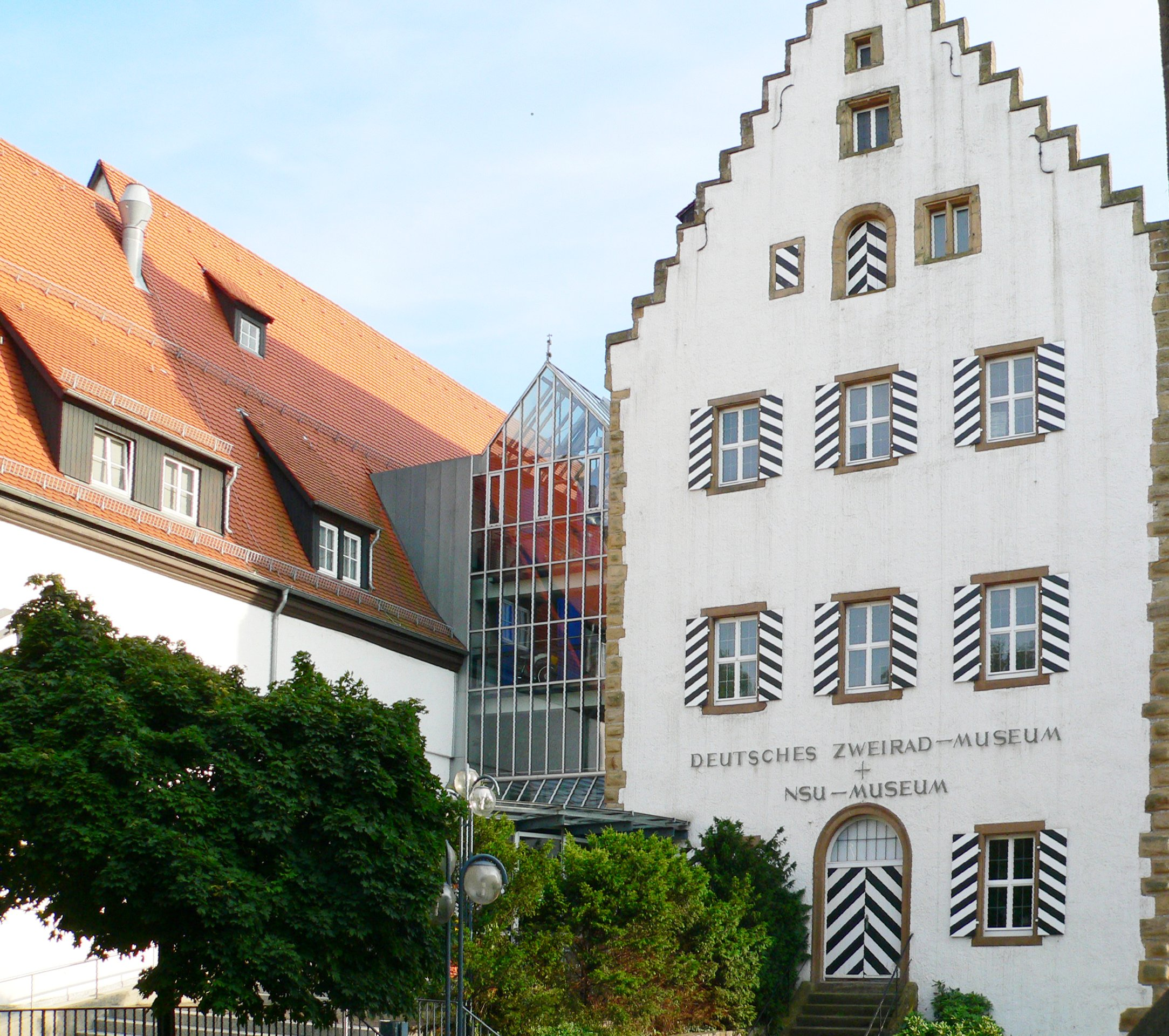
Deutsches Zweirad- und NSU-Museum

Deutsches Zweirad- und NSU-Museum, Neckarsulm, Baden-Württemberg

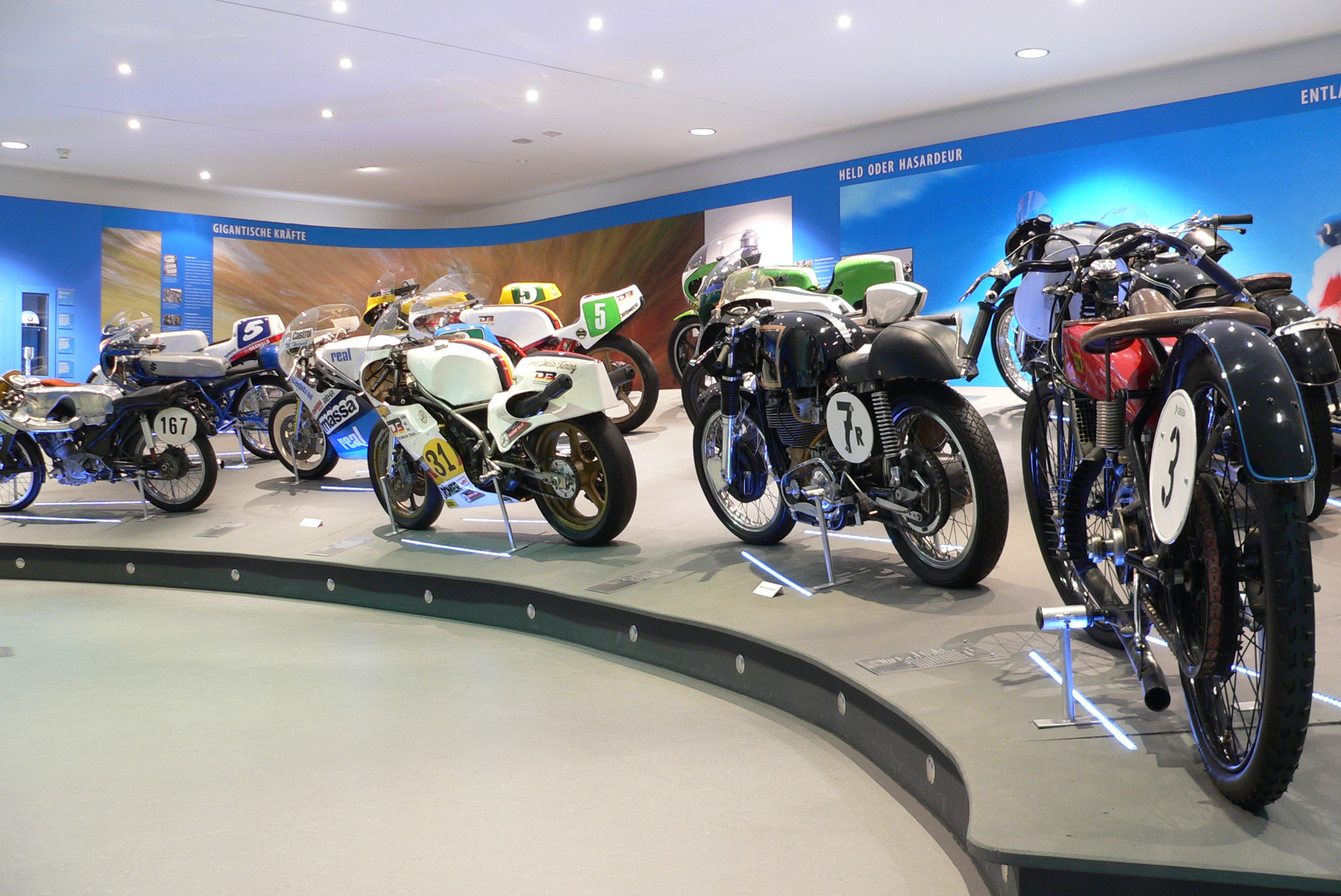
Motor racing exhibit

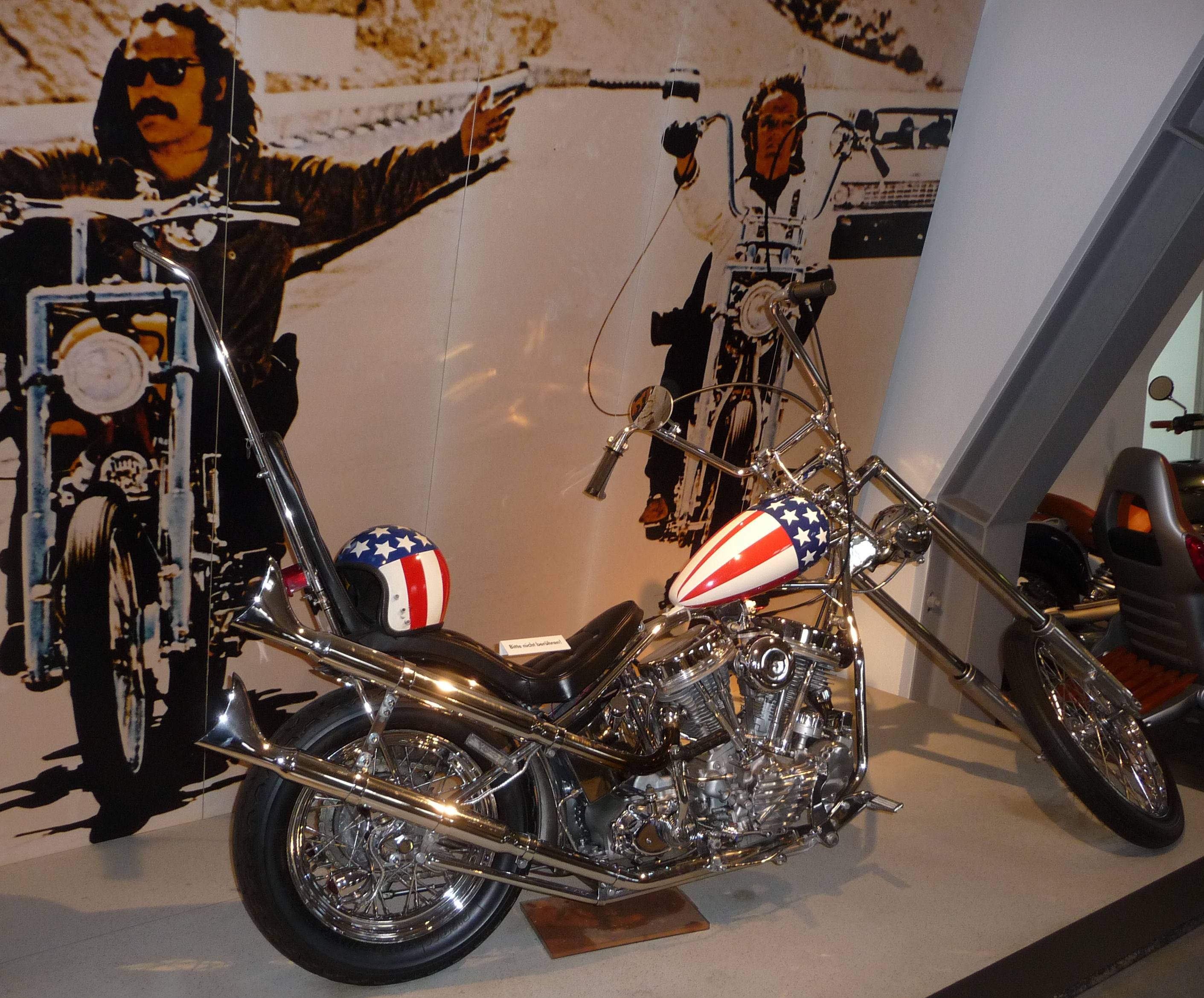
Replica of the Easy Rider Harley Chopper, in front of move scene

The Deutsches Zweirad- und NSU-Museum in Neckarsulm, Germany has a collection of historic motorcycles and bicycles in a five-story split-level building dating to 13th Century. Motorcycles representing 50 manufacturers are displayed, including a reproduction of the 1885 Daimler Einspur, the first gasoline, internal combustion motorcycle, and an 1894 Hildebrand & Wolfmüller, the first production motorcycle. There is also an exhibit of NSU Motorenwerke AG vehicles.

== History ==
Neckarsulm and NSU were formerly often interchangeable terms. The two-wheeler was not invented in Neckarsulm, but NSU was one of the first companies in the world to produce bicycles starting in 1886, and starting in 1901, motorcycles. So the idea was to build a motorcycle museum in Neckarsulm, Germany. One important reason was the two-wheeled crisis in the mid-1950s. For later generations, it was said at the time, dying two-wheeled technology should be documented and handed down. With the support of FA NSU and the Deutsches Museum in Munich, especially its head of department Dipl. Eng Max Rauck, the Deutsches Zweirad-Museum was established on initiative of former Mayor Dr. Hans Hoffmann in the Deutschordensschloss, a former castle of the Teutonic Knights. It was inaugurated on Saturday, 19 May 1956, in the presence of domestic and foreign guests. The exhibition comprised at that time about 70 exhibits, which were presented on 600 m^{2}. In 1971, it was the first exhibition on the subject of world record vehicles. In the years from 1956 to 1977, the museum received around half a million visitors. The exhibition space and the number of exhibits were continuously enlarged. 1981 200 exhibits on 900 m^{2} were shown and in 1984 the area again expanded to 1200 m^{2}. in 1986, the NSU department opened, and the museum was given its present name: "Deutsches Zweirad – and NSU-Museum". In 1989, the museum was remodeled. At this time, the two historical Bandhaus and Amtshaus (palace) buildings were connected by a modern steel and glass ramp/staircase. The name "staircase" is misleading, because the individual floors are accessible with wheelchair ramps. In 1991, the museum reopened with an area of almost 2000 m^{2} with 350 exhibits. In 2005, the new conception of the museum started with a redesign of the racing department on the second floor. The new design offered a public open house event in its 50th anniversary year of 2006.

== See also ==
- Outline of motorcycles and motorcycling
