= Monolith Festival =

Coordinates: 39°39′56″N 105°12′19″W

- Genre: Alternative rock, modern rock, indie pop, hip hop, punk rock, blues
- Dates: Mid-September
- Locations: Red Rocks Amphitheatre, Morrison, Colorado, US
- Years active: 2007–2009
- Website: Official website

The Monolith Festival was a music festival held at Red Rocks Amphitheatre in Morrison, Colorado. The first festival took place September 14–15, 2007 on 5 stages, including the Red Rocks main stage.

The 2008 Monolith Festival was held on September 13–14.

On April 11, 2009, it was announced on the official Monolith Festival Facebook Page that the 2009 Monolith Festival will be held on September 12–13.

== 2007 ==
=== Lineup ===
The lineup for the 2007 festival comprised over 50 bands, including (although not limited to):

- Art Brut
- Au Revoir Simone
- Bob Log III
- Black Rebel Motorcycle Club
- The Brian Jonestown Massacre
- Cake
- Clap Your Hands Say Yeah
- Cloud Cult
- Das EFX
- The Decemberists
- Editors
- Everything Absent or Distorted
- Hot IQs
- The Flaming Lips
- Flosstradamus
- Ghostland Observatory
- Kid Sister
- Kings of Leon
- Matt & Kim
- Spoon
- William Elliott Whitmore

== 2008 ==
=== Lineup ===
The lineup for the 2008 festival included (although was not limited to):

- DeVotchKa
- Silversun Pickups
- Vampire Weekend
- Snowden
- Mickey Avalon
- Del the Funky Homosapien
- Cut Copy
- The Fratellis
- Justice (French band)
- TV on the Radio
- Band of Horses
- Rock Plaza Central
- Erin Ivey
- CSS
- The Avett Brothers
- Sharon Jones & The Dap-Kings
- Dan le sac vs Scroobius Pip
- Holy F**k
- White Denim
- Superdrag
- The Night Marchers
- A Place to Bury Strangers
- The Giraffes
- SoundRabbit
- The Photo Atlas
- Blitzen Trapper
- The Kills
- Pop Levi
- Tilly and the Wall
- John Vanderslice
- Atmosphere
- Akron/Family

== 2009 ==
=== Rain ===
As is the custom at Red Rocks, the show went on despite Rocky Mountain thunderstorms and showers.

=== Lineup ===
The lineup for the 2009 festival included (although was not limited to):

- The Mars Volta
- Chromeo
- Yeah Yeah Yeahs
- The Walkmen
- Phoenix
- Of Montreal
- Method Man & Redman
- OK Go
- Passion Pit
- DOOM
- Health
- Girl Talk
- M. Ward
- The Dandy Warhols
- Miniature Tigers
- Monotonix
- Frightened Rabbit
- Starfucker
- Thunderheist
- These United States
- Harlem Shakes
- Woodhands
- Thao with the Get Down Stay Down
- The Pains of Being Pure at Heart
- The Twilight Sad
- The Antlers
- Viva Voce
- The Answering Machine
- Deer Tick
- The Thermals
- Cymbals Eat Guitars
- We Were Promised Jetpacks
- Lydia
- Generationals
- The Grates
- Spindrift
- Wendy Darling
- Cotton Jones
- Jim McTunan & The Kids That Killed The Man
- FIR E!
- Beats Antique
- Gregory Alan Isakov
- Speakeasy Tiger
- Savoy and The Pirate Signal
- Danielle Ate the Sandwich
- The Knew
- The Glitch Mob
- Tigercity
- Avi Buffalo
- Edward Sharpe & The Magnetic Zeros
- Thermals and Thao
- Rachel Goodrich
- French Horn Rebellion
- Roadside Graves
