= Cowboy Dave Band =

American music group

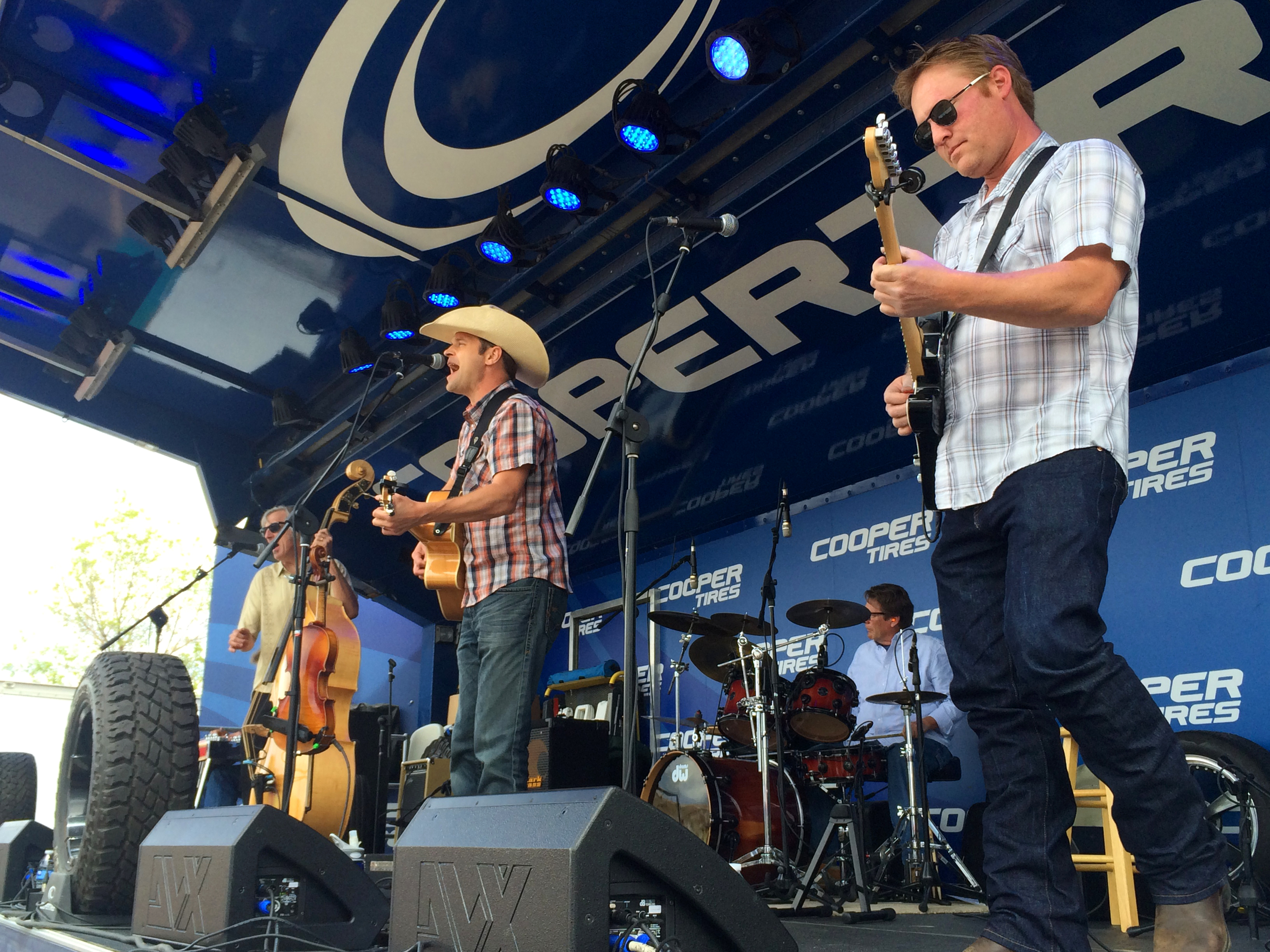

Background information
- Origin: Denver, Colorado, U.S.
- Genres: Country, honky-tonk, alternative country
- Years active: 2009–present
- Labels: Slackjaw Records
- Members: Cowboy Dave Wilson; Scott Johnson; Zach Boddicker; Christie Schneider; Andy Sweetser
- Website: cowboydaveband.com

The Cowboy Dave Band is a honky-tonk group, currently based along the Front Range of Colorado. The country quintet was originally formed in 2009 in Omaha, Nebraska, by Cowboy Dave Wilson, who also served as the long-time front man for the cowpunk group FortyTwenty.

== Origins ==
Wilson spent the better part of seven years (2002–2009) touring through much of the midwest and south with Nebraska-based FortyTwenty, which saw an album reach the No. 12 spot on XM Satellite Radio's X-Country chart and earned an invitation to Nashville, Tenn., by CMT to record songs as part of its "New Voices, No Cover" segment. When the band took an extended hiatus in 2009, Wilson "called in some favors" and recruited players to record a six-song album, "Saddle Up, Pal," which was released on Slackjaw Records on March 30, 2009.

Upon relocating to Colorado Springs, Colorado, in 2010, Wilson assembled a group of Rocky Mountain veteran musicians, including former members of the Railbenders, Slim Cessna's Auto Club, and the Honky Tonk Hangovers.

The Colorado-based group hit Silo Sound Studios in Denver to record the band's second six-song record, "Driven Man," which was released on February 25, 2014. The album reached No. 149 on the AMA Chart.

In 2023, the group released its first full-length album, "Venture South," a 10-song nod to the American West, recorded at studios in both Texas and Colorado.

The current touring lineup includes Scott Johnson (upright bass), Zach Boddicker (electric guitar), Andy Sweetser (drums) and Christie Schneider (fiddle).

== Venture South (2023) ==
Recorded at studios in both Texas and Colorado, Cowboy Dave released his first full-length album, "Venture South," on April 14, 2023. Produced by GRAMMY winner John Macy, the 10-song album draws on influences from the Bakersfield sound, as well as music from Texas Hill Country.

Musicians on the album include veteran session player JayDee Maness on pedal steel, who played and recorded with Buck Owens, the Byrds and Gram Parsons, among others. Eugene Moles, who worked with Merle Haggard played guitar on two tracks, while Jim Christie, who toured with Dwight Yoakam, played drums.

While recording in Dripping Springs, Texas, Wilson and the band were joined by Tommy Detamore (Johnny Bush, Moe Bandy, Robert Earl Keen, Ray Price) on pedal steel and Hank Singer (Alan Jackson, George Jones, Ray Price) on fiddle. Also playing on the record were Colorado-based musicians Zach Boddicker (telecaster), Scott Johnson (upright bass) and Andy Sweetser (drums).

=== Track list ===
1. 287 (Wilson/Sparks)
2. Honky-Tonk Hot Sauce (Wilson)
3. Sandhill Girl (Wilson)
4. This Kind of Living (Wilson)
5. Cruel, Cruel Queen (Wilson)
6. Whiskey Tonight (Wilson)
7. Skunk Yodel No. 7 (Wilson/Tilton)
8. Mama Drove a Big Rig (Wilson)
9. Guts and a Horse (Wilson)
10. You'll Never be a Prophet (Wilson)

== Driven Man (2014) ==
Recorded at Silo Sound Studios by Todd Divel, and produced by Emmy-nominated producer Greg Kincheloe, the sophomore Cowboy Dave EP, "Driven Man," features Denver veterans Glenn Taylor (pedal steel), Scott Johnson (upright bass and vocals), Adam Stern (electric and acoustic guitars) and Andy Walters (drums), as well as additional Nebraskans Sam Packard (fiddle) and Tony Robertson (electric guitar).

=== Track list ===
1. Dive of Dives (Wilson)
2. Ragged but Right (traditional)
3. Driven Man (Wilson)
4. Honky-Tonk Me (Wilson)
5. Maggie's Mom (Wilson)
6. What a Shame (Johnson/Toner/Leonard)

== Saddle Up, Pal (2009) ==
Produced by Emmy-nominated producer Greg Kincheloe, the debut Cowboy Dave Band EP, "Saddle Up, Pal," features Steve "Fuzzy" Blazek (pedal steel guitar), Tony Hillhouse (drums), Charlie Johnson (upright bass), Tony Robertson (electric guitar), as well as Wilson on fiddle and acoustic guitar.

=== Track list ===
1. Friend in a Bottle (Wilson)
2. Bill, Wyoming (Wilson)
3. Cowboy Dave Theme Song (Wilson)
4. Baptist Church Blues (Wilson/Sparks)
5. Drug Around (Wilson)
6. Dimestore Cowboy (Wilson)

== Discography ==
Title	Album details
Saddle Up, Pal	Release date: March 30, 2009; Label: Slackjaw Records
Driven Man	Release date: February 25, 2014; Label: Slackjaw Records
Venture South	Release date: April 14, 2023; Label: Independent
