= Arlen Ness =

American entrepreneur and motorcycle designer (1939–2019)

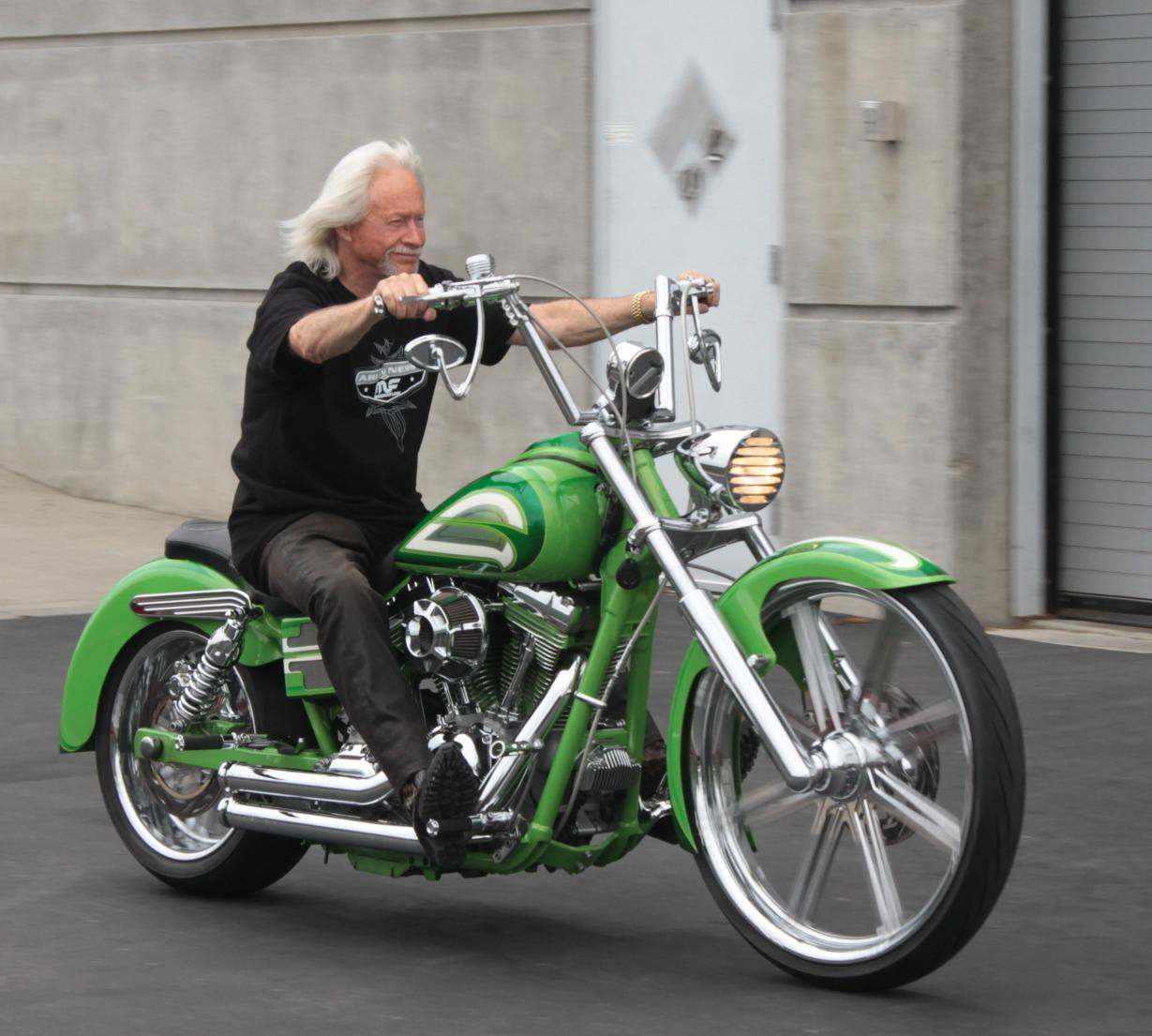
- Ness in 2014
- Born: July 12, 1939; Moorhead, Minnesota, U.S.
- Died: March 22, 2019 (aged 79)
- Occupations: Motorcycle designer, entrepreneur
- Years active: 1960–2019
- Known for: Custom motorcycles
- Spouse: Beverly Ness (m. 1960)
- Relatives: Cory Ness (son), Zach Ness (grandson)
- Website: www.arlenness.com

Arlen Darryl Ness (July 12, 1939 – March 22, 2019) was an American motorcycle designer and entrepreneur best known for his custom motorcycles. Ness received acclaim for his designs, most of which are noted for their unique body style and paintwork.

== Personal life ==
Ness was born in Moorhead, Minnesota, on July 12, 1939, to Elaine and Ervin Ness, and moved to San Lorenzo, California, when he was in the sixth grade.

Prior to his career as a motorcycle builder, Ness worked as a pin setter at the local bowling alley, and later as a post office worker and furniture mover. He competed in semi-professional bowling leagues, the earnings of which he used to buy his first motorcycle, a 1947 Harley-Davidson Knucklehead that he later customized.

Ness was married to his wife Beverly for 59 years until his death.

== Career ==
His first customized bikes were made in the garage of his home in San Leandro, California, but by the early 1970s he had moved to a storefront on East 14th Street.

Ness was recognized for his painting style and for developing a line of custom motorcycle parts. His popularity grew as he built new custom bikes and then had those displayed on the bike show circuit and featured in motorcycle magazines.

After more than three decades of custom bike building, his business, Arlen Ness Motorcycles, moved to a Dublin, California, facility that includes a museum with more than 40 of his custom motorcycles, including his Untouchable, the twin motor Two Bad, the antique inspired Ness-Tique, Blower Bike, the Italian sports car inspired Ferrari Bike, the '57 Chevy inspired Ness-Stalgia, the Bugatti-like Smooth-Ness, the Discovery Channel's Biker Build-Off bike Top Banana and his jet-powered Mach Ness. The company is also an authorized dealership for Victory Motorcycles and for Indian Motorcycles.

The Mach Ness is a motorcycle that Ness built in 2005, inspired by Jay Leno's turbine-powered bike, that uses a jet-powered helicopter engine as its power plant. The design, concept, paint and graphics were created by Carl Brouhard and the hand-made aluminum body work was by Bob Monroe.

Ness received recognition and awards including Builder of the Year, induction into the Motorcycle Hall of Fame and Lifetime Achievement Awards. His son, Cory Ness, worked with Ness for more than 30 years, and now runs the day-to-day business operations at Arlen Ness, Inc. Cory has himself been recognized as a top custom bike builder and even defeated his father in a 2004 episode of Biker Build-Off. Carrying on the family tradition to a third generation, Cory's son, Zach Ness, built several high end custom bikes before finishing high school in 2006.

Ness received a patent for the Big Shot, a method of altering the motorcycle's fuel injection system, and thereby enhancing its performance.

Ness died on March 22, 2019, at the age of 79.

== Gallery ==
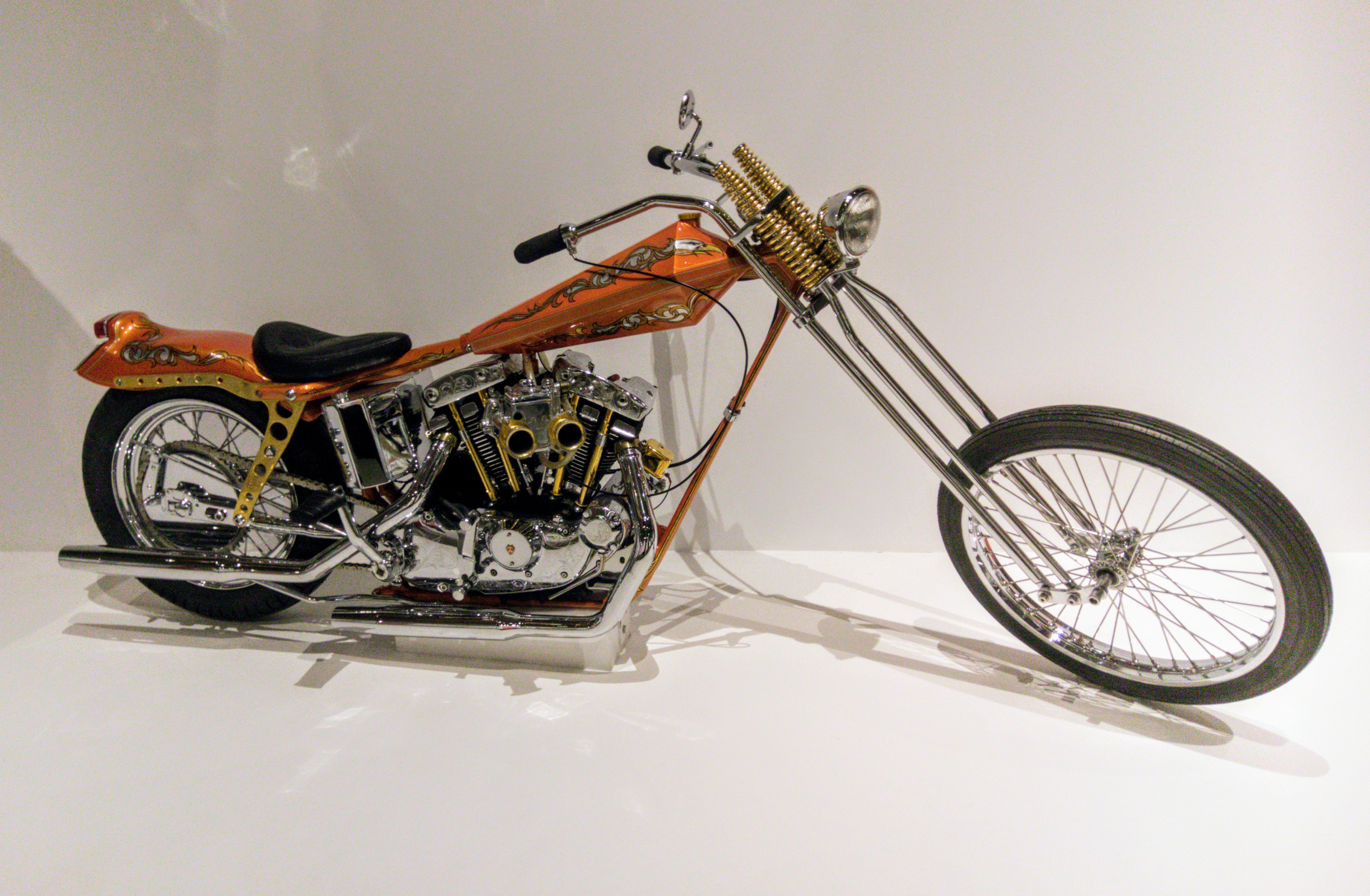
QuickNess, in the permanent collection of the Oakland Museum of California.

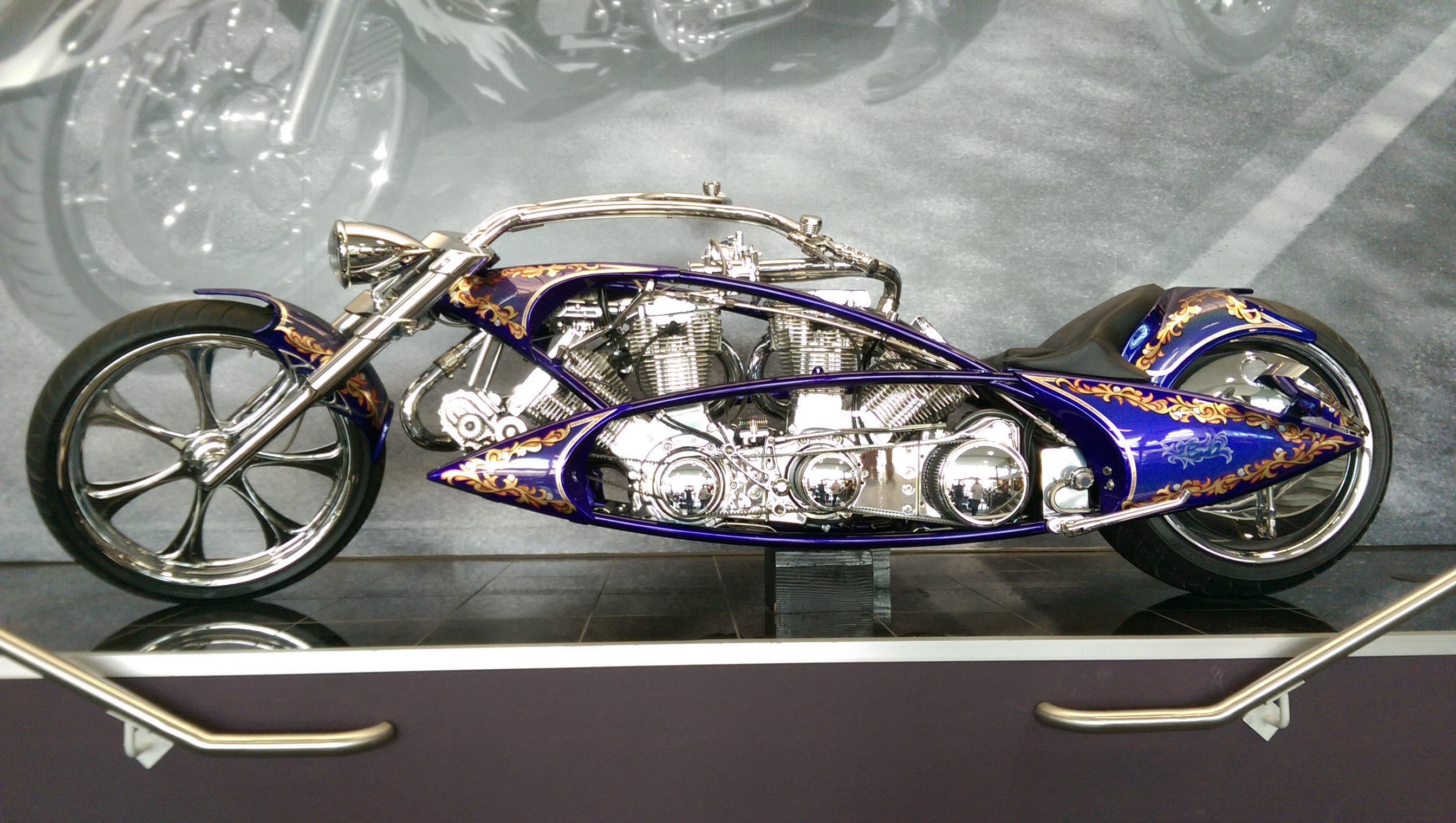
A motorcycle with two engines by Arlen Ness

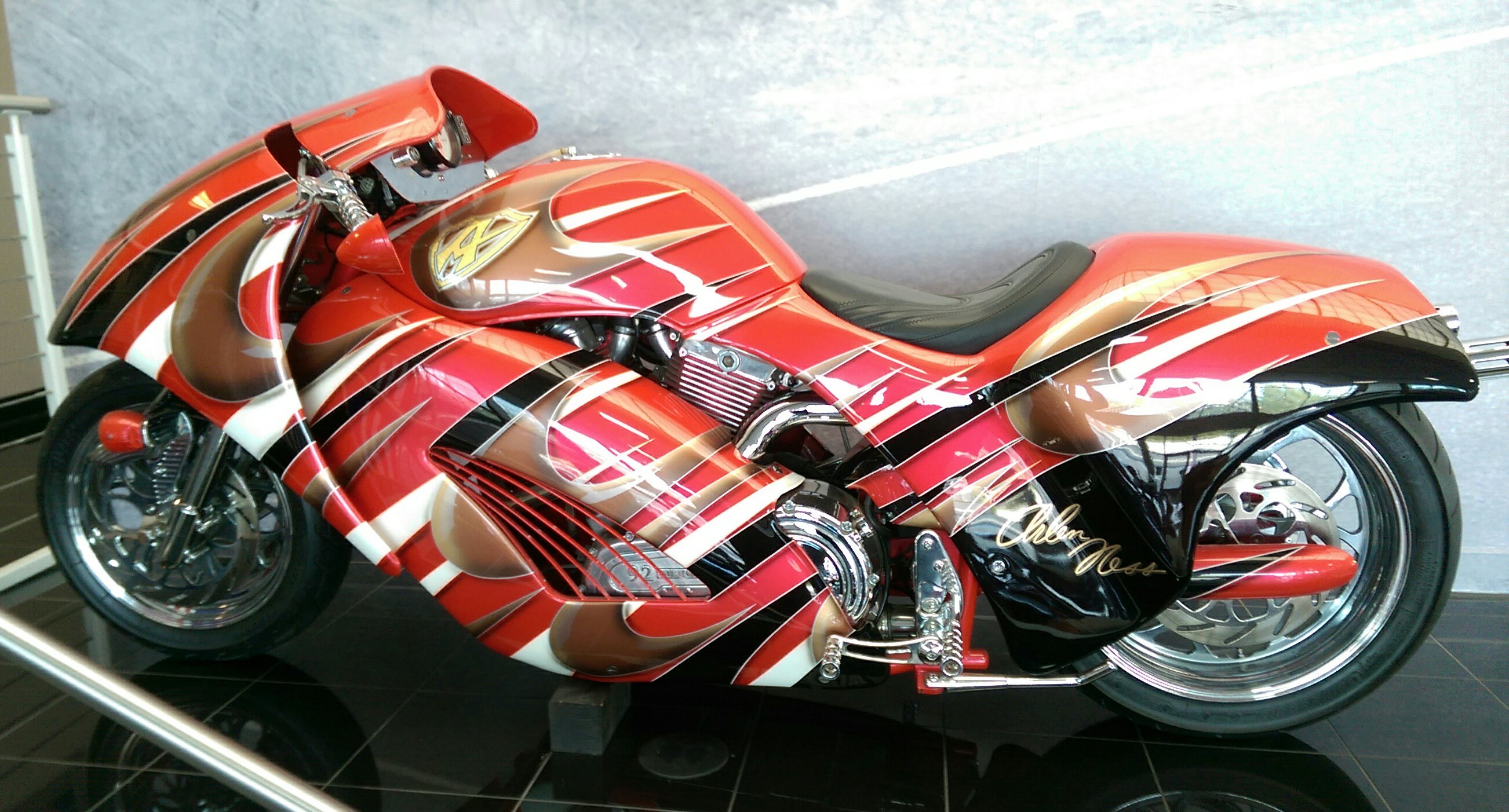
A streamlined motorcycle by Arlen Ness

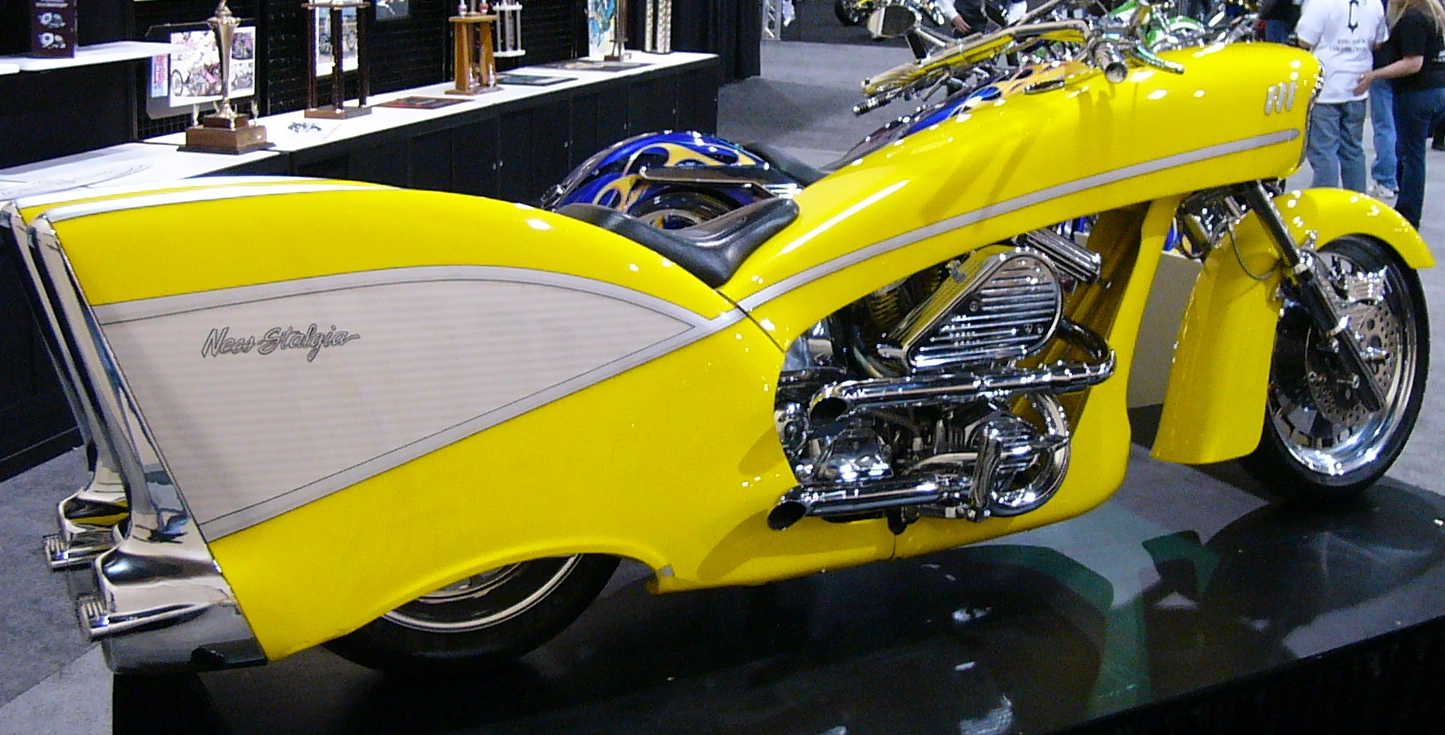
Ness-Stalgia Model

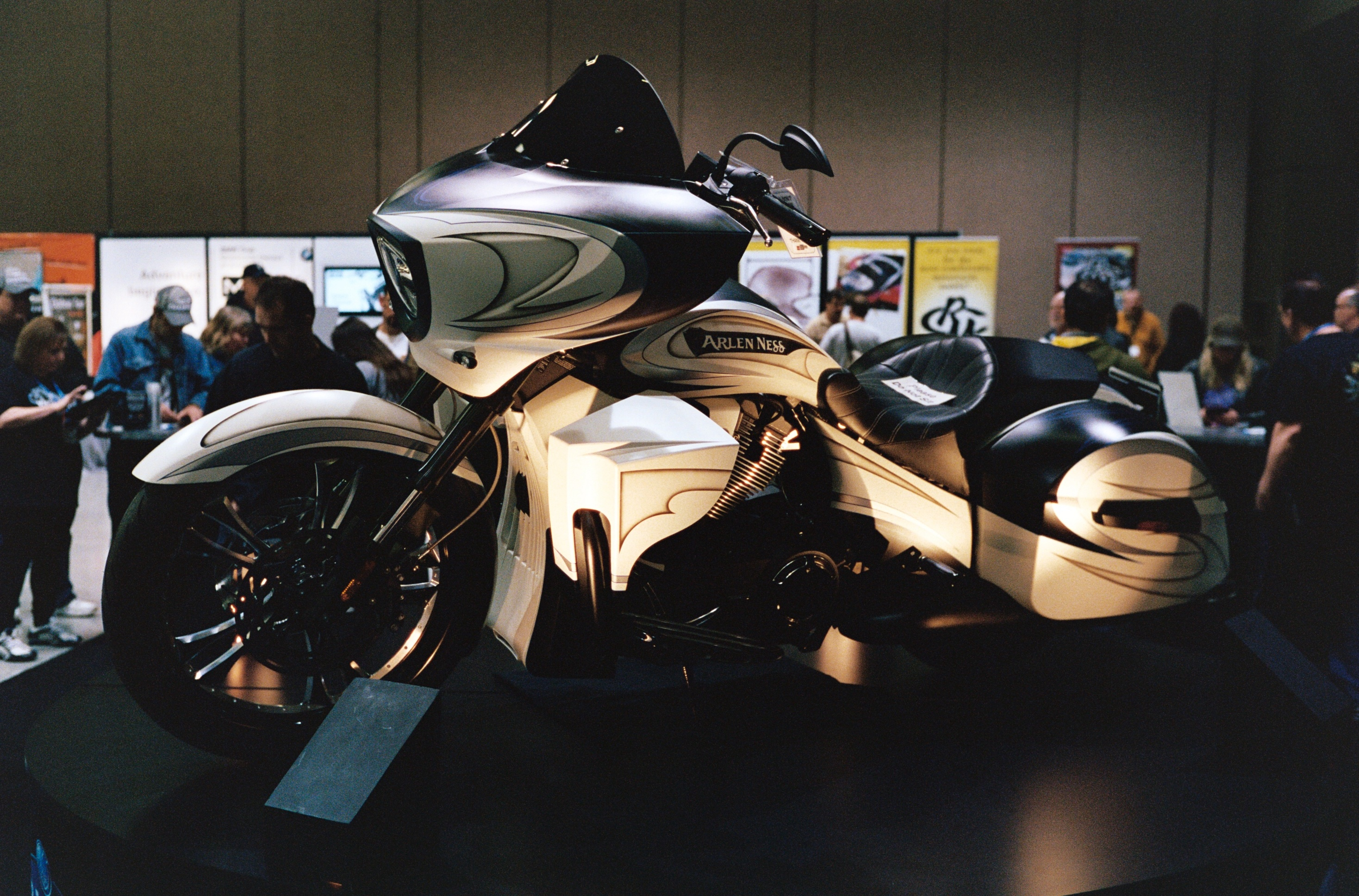
Arlen Ness Victory motorcycle at the Seattle International Motorcycle Show

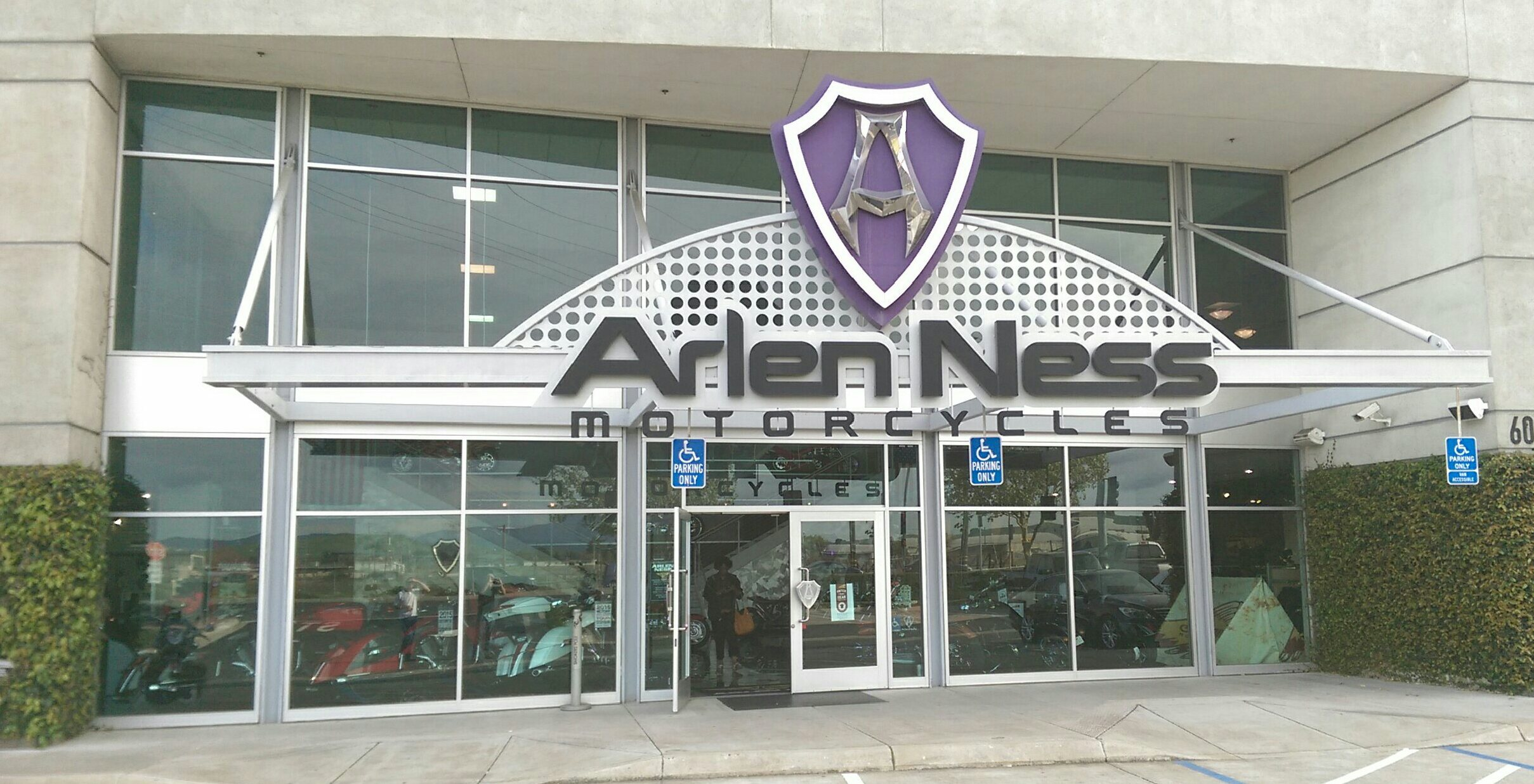
Entrance to Arlen Ness Motorcycles in Dublin, California

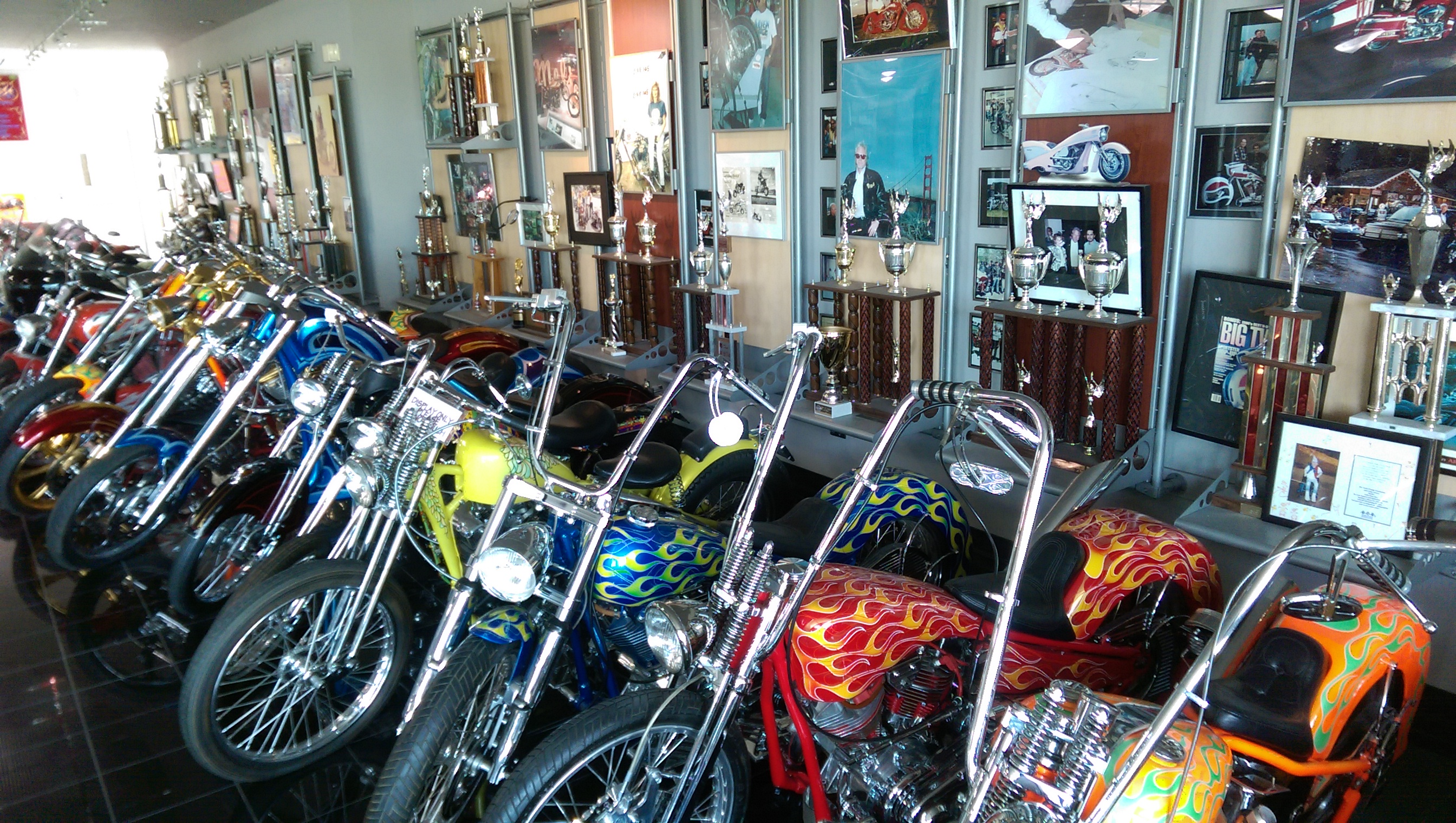
Arlen Ness motorcycles and trophies on display in Dublin, California
