= Zach Ness =

American motorcycle builder

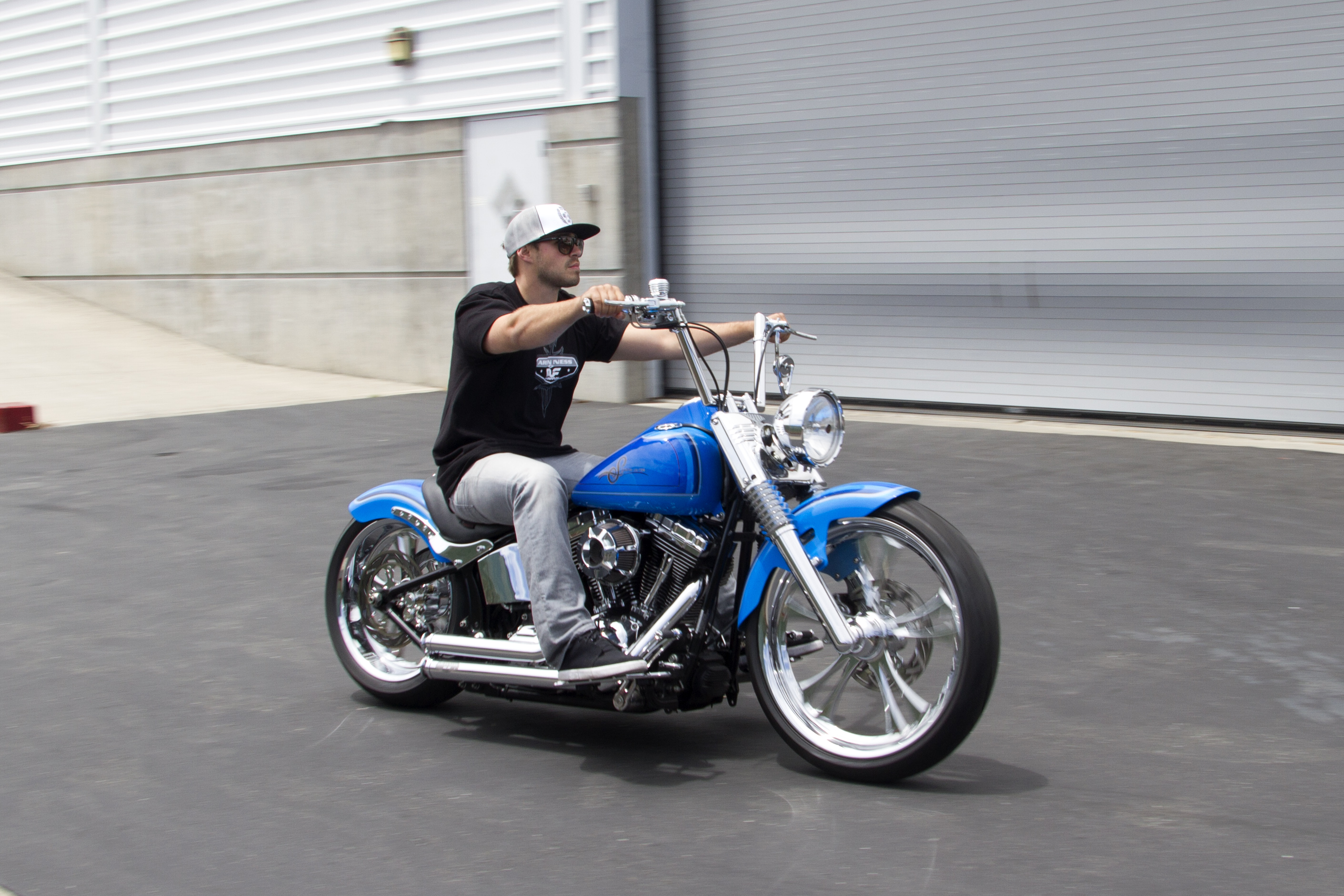
- Born: April 11, 1988 (age 38)
- Other name: Z-Ness
- Occupations: Motorcycle designer, entrepreneur, reality television actor
- Known for: Custom motorcycles
- Relatives: Arlen Ness, Cory Ness

Zach Ness (born April 11, 1988) is a third-generation American motorcycle designer and entrepreneur. He is the grandson of motorcycle customizer Arlen Ness, and son of Cory Ness. In 2013 Zach teamed up with National Geographic Channel for the television series Let It Ride. The series followed Zach as he and the Ness crew built custom bikes for clients.
