= Mile High Music Festival =

Music festival in Commerce City, Colorado

Coordinates: 39°48′20″N 104°53′30″W

- Dates: August 14 and 15, 2010; July in 2008-2009
- Locations: Commerce City, Colorado, United States
- Years active: 2008 – 2010
- Website: www.milehighmusicfestival.com

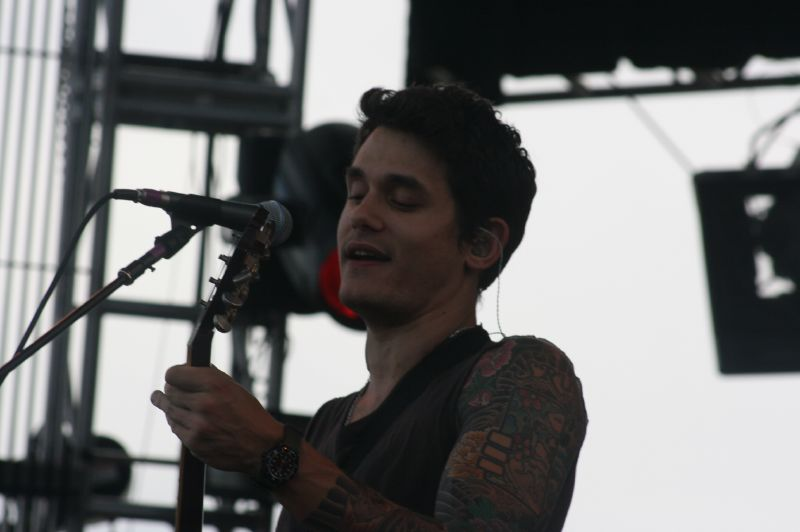
John Clayton Mayer playing at the Mile High Music Festival in 2008

The Mile High Music Festival was an annual two-day concert that took place for three years. It was held in Commerce City, Colorado at Dick's Sporting Goods Park, first done on July 19 and 20, 2008. The concert was originally scheduled to be held at City Park in Denver (near the Denver Zoo), but changed because of opposition from zoo officials. 2010 was the last year and promoter AEG announced that the festival would be cancelled for 2011 "due to the economy"

== Lineups ==
=== 2008 ===
- Dave Matthews Band
- Tom Petty
- John Mayer
- O.A.R.
- The Roots
- moe.
- Leftover Salmon
- Citizen Cope
- Martin Sexton
- Andrew Bird
- Josh Ritter
- Ingrid Michaelson
- Rose Hill Drive
- The Photo Atlas
- Serena Ryder
- The Railbenders
- Pinback
- Born in the Flood
- The New Mastersounds
- The Black Crowes
- Spoon
- Michael Franti & Spearhead
- Rodrigo y Gabriela
- Steve Winwood
- Flogging Molly
- Colbie Caillat
- OneRepublic
- Meese
- Newton Faulkner
- Tea Leaf Green
- Lupe Fiasco
- Brett Dennen
- Bob Schneider
- Grace Potter and the Nocturnals
- State Radio
- Stephen Kellogg and the Sixers
- Flobots
- Gavin DeGraw
- Jason Mraz
- Mofro
- Eric Hutchinson

- Mike Gordon

=== 2009 ===
July 18

- Tool
- Widespread Panic
- Incubus
- Ben Harper & Relentless7
- G. Love & Special Sauce
- Ani DiFranco
- The Black Keys
- Galactic
- Paolo Nutini
- Gomez
- The Greyboy Allstars
- Railroad Earth
- India.arie
- Lyrics Born
- Rocco Deluca & The Burden
- Needtobreathe
- Band of Heathens
- Davy Knowles & Back Door Slam
- Set Forth
- Early Pearl

July 19

- Widespread Panic
- The Fray
- Gov't Mule
- Thievery Corporation
- 3OH!3
- Buddy Guy
- John Butler
- DeVotchKa
- Gogol Bordello
- Galactic
- Guster
- The Wailers
- Matisyahu
- Robert Randolph and the Family Band
- Mat Kearney
- Dead Confederate
- Jack's Mannequin
- Jerry Joseph & the Jackmormons
- Erin McCarley
- Paper Bird
- honeyhoney
- Joe Pug
- Electric Touch
- Strange Condition

=== 2010 ===
August 14

- Jack Johnson
- Steve Miller Band
- Slightly Stoopid
- Phoenix
- Nas & Damian Marley
- Keane
- Cypress Hill
- Derek Trucks & Susan Tedeschi Band
- The Samples
- Keller Williams
- Rusted Root
- Donavon Frankenreiter
- Amos Lee
- Mayer Hawthorne & The County
- ALO
- One eskimO
- The Constellations
- The Motet
- Snake Rattle Rattle Snake
- Houses
- Bobby Long
- The Chain Gang of 1974

August 15

- Dave Matthews Band
- Weezer
- My Morning Jacket
- Atmosphere
- Train
- Jimmy Cliff
- Bassnectar
- Z-Trip
- Drive-By Truckers
- Railroad Earth
- Ozomatli
- Punch Brothers featuring Chris Thile
- Tim Reynolds & TR3
- Trevor Hall
- Matt Morris
- Boombox
- Oh My Stars
- Joe Purdy
- The Knew
- Danielle Ate the Sandwich
- The Epilogues
