= In the Whale =

American alternative rock band

- Origin: Greeley, Colorado, United States
- Genres: Alternative rock, hard rock, punk rock
- Years active: 2010–2025
- Label: Riot Records
- Members: Nate Valdez - lead vocals, guitar Eric Riley - drums, vocals
- Website: www.inthewhalecult.com

In the Whale (stylized as INTHEWHALE) is an American alternative rock band from Greeley, Colorado composed of Nathaniel Valdez and Eric Riley.

== History ==
=== Early years and Cake ===
In the Whale began as a solo project for vocalist Nathaniel Valdez while obtaining his Masters in Educational Psychology at the University of Northern Colorado. With the addition of drummer Eric Riley, the duo relocated to Denver, CO. Both Valdez and Riley were raised in conservative and religious households. However, most of the content of their songs displays rebellious attitude against the views they were taught as youths. Valdez also cites his experience as an undertaker as a catalyst for the morbid nature of the band’s lyrical content of its newer material.

=== First release ===
Cake was their first commercial release in 2012, produced by Tickle Me Pink guitarist Joey Barba. This gave scope for the band’s growth across the state of Colorado which eventually landed them an opportunity for a supporting slot on The Photo Atlas' Spring 2012 tour of the Midwest and inclusion in KTCL's annual Hometown for the Holidays contest.

Two tracks from Cake were licensed to TV and films: "Woman", in a Victory Motorcycles national TV commercial, and "Heels", in the award-winning documentary Why We Ride.

A live version of "Heels" has a record for the opening track on Colorado Public Radio's OpenAir 2015 Record Store Day release.

=== Nate & Eric ===
In the Whale's subsequent release, Nate & Eric, gained press and radio play beyond their home state.

The seven-track EP rated as high as number 38 on the combined charts reported from various college and community radio stations. Nate & Eric reached number 119 on the CMJ Top 200 and was one of the 20 Most Added Records, during the week of its debut. Nate was featured in a story published by Denver's Westword that detailed his day job - when he's not playing music.

The band opened the Denver installment of 2014's Riot Fest and played at noted Regional Music Festivals like Treefort Music Festival and The UMS. In the Whale spent the summer and fall of 2014 touring alongside Guttermouth, Jane's Addiction and The Presidents of the United States of America.

=== Full Nelson, Lollapalooza and Austin City Limits ===
The release of 2015's Full Nelson EP got them to number 92 on the combined college radio charts. The band continued to receive favourable reviews not just for this release, but also for their live shows. Reviewer Brian Johnson calls the band "consistently enthralling"; reviewer Jed Murphy stated his only complaint about the album is "how short it is".

In 2015, the duo played at major music festivals such as Lollapalooza, Austin City Limits, Canadian Music Week and South by Southwest, which received reviews from the likes of the Chicago Tribune and others. The band's inclusion in the Lollapalooza line-up was a major distinction as they are among the five Colorado artists to play the event in the last decade.

In the Whale served as the Official Correspondent for Denver's Westword newspaper during 2015's SXSW Music Festival in Austin, TX.

The band was also selected for Taco Bell's 'Feed the Beat' and Quiznos 'Toasty on Tour' artist programs and included on New Music Seminar's Artists on the Verge list for 2015.

=== Neighbor ===
In the Whale entered a working relationship with Red Bull GmbH's music incubator, Red Bull Sound Select, recording a two-song release with production by No Age (Sub Pop records), in September 2015. The title track "Neighbor" premiered on October 14, 2015, via Substream Magazine, with the B-side track, "Pray for the Prey", following on October 22, 2015 via CMJ.

In support of the release, the band toured with The Darkness, Toadies, and Nashville Pussy during the fall of 2015.

=== Dopamine ===
The band celebrated their seven year anniversary in 2018 with Dopamine, a six track EP produced by Steve Evetts (The Used, Sepultura, Dillinger Escape Plan) and recorded at the Foo Fighters’ famed Studio 606. Dopamine’s first weeks sales made it on to the Billboard Heatseekers, Independent Albums and Heatseekers Mountain (#1) charts.

During the Dopamine release, the band opened at Punk Rock Bowling and Warped Tour. Played Regional Music Festivals like Bohemian Nights, Westword Music Showcase, and The Greeley Block Party. In the Whale spent the summer and fall of 2018 playing alongside Bob Mold, Decendents, Authority Zero, Toadies, Local H, Flatliners, DOA, Underoath, and Papa Roach.

=== Signing with Riot Records ===
In the Whale signed to Riot Records, a sub-label of the larger Golden Robot Records in late 2019. Riot records is an Australian label. Notable acts include Filter, Gibby Clark, Jefferson Starship, King's X, and Riley's LA Guns.

=== "Drug Dealer", "Crosses", "Jeffrey" and "Smoke Break" ===
The band's 2020 single "Drug Dealer" contains Eric Riley's screaming backing vocals, while fast guitars paired with slower drums "create a push-and-pull effect and an overall edgy vibe". The song also contains lyrics about the pharmaceutical industry. "There's this never-ending pandemic of drugs that are being pushed into people," says guitarist Nate Valdez. "It happens to be backed by the biggest drug dealers, which happen to be the pharmaceutical companies that are giving kickbacks to doctors who are prescribing these drugs."

"Crosses" is the follow-up to the single "Drug Dealer". In a statement, the band said: "Crosses is lyrically about looking yourself in the mirror, realizing everyone is going to die and humbly wondering why we're all here and what this is all for. We tried to execute a feeling of franticness and anxiousness with the push and pull off each musical section."

"Jeffrey" is the follow-up to "Crosses" and "Drug Dealer", and released by Riot Records. "Jeffrey" is an examination of the lengths one will go to in order to convince others that they are "just like you", while their actions speak differently. The song contains "frantic" lyrics and jagged/staccato verse sections.

"Smoke Break" is about addiction, depression, suicide, and what happens when people isolate themselves for too long. The song was released to coincide with Mental Health Awareness Month.

== Discography ==
=== Extended plays ===
- 2012: Cake (self-released)
- 2014: Quicksand (self-released)
- 2014: Nate & Eric (self-released)
- 2015: Full Nelson (self-released)
- 2015: Neighbor (Red Bull Sound Select)
- 2018: Dopamine (self-released)
- 2020: Quarantine Sessions (self-released)

=== Singles and covers ===
- 2013: "Add It Up" (Violent Femmes cover)
- 2014: "Sliver" (Nirvana cover)
- 2014: "Ride"
- 2014: "(Mile High) Ride"
- 2020: "Drug Dealer" (Riot Records)
- 2020: "Crosses" (Riot Records)
- 2021: "Jeffrey" (Riot Records)
- 2021: "Smoke Break" (Riot Records)
