= The Knew =

American rock and roll band

- Origin: Denver, Colorado
- Genres: Indie rock, punk rock
- Years active: 2005 – present
- Labels: Snappy Little Numbers
- Members: Jacob Hansen; Tyler Breuer; Tim Rynders; Andy Thomas
- Website: Official site

The Knew is an American rock and roll band from Denver, CO consisting of Jacob Hansen (guitars, vocals), Tim Rynders (bass), Tyler Breuer (guitars), and Andy Thomas (drums). The group takes influences from such acts as The Rolling Stones, The Clash, Dillinger Four, The Replacements, and My Morning Jacket. The Knew has shared the stage with numerous national acts such as Cold War Kids, Deer Tick, Titus Andronicus, Afghan Whigs, Fake Problems, Manchester Orchestra, Slim Cessna's Auto Club and has appeared at such festivals as South by Southwest, CMJ Music Marathon, Mile High Music Festival and the Monolith Festival. The band is renowned for their high energy performances and being front row boys.

The Knew's song "Salvazar" was featured in the AMC drama show, Breaking Bad and their songs "By Yourself" and "United" are both available for the Rock Band series on Xbox 360. In the Spring of 2011, their song "Coldblack" was featured in an advertisement for Victory Motorcycles.

The Knew's debut LP, Pulpería, was charted on the CMJ 200 in May 2010 and received favorable reviews from local and national press, with The Onion citing each track as having a "renewed complexity and diversity of emotion... a rich, enjoyable listen".

The Knew's second full length, Man Monster, was released in August 2012 to critical acclaim. It was recorded at Black and Bluhm Studios in the Park Hill neighborhood of Denver. Man Monster is noted as their most ambitious release to date.

In 2013, Snappy Little Numbers Recordings released the What's Hip (Long Walk)/World War (Ay Ay Ay Alright) single. The songs have received much critical attention in both the U.S. and Australia.

The Knew also recorded a Daytrotter Session in 2013, which features previously unreleased songs and different versions of older material. It also includes a Cock Sparrer cover.

The Knew released their third full-length album, Schmew, in September 2015 under the Greater Than Collective label. It's a gas.

== Discography ==
- Boom Bust (EP)(2008)
- Pulpería (album) (2010, SFP Records 001)
- Before It Ends 7" (2010, SFP Records 002)
- Man Monster (LP) (2012, SFP Records 004)
- What's Hip (Long Walk)/World War (Ay Ay Ay Alright) (2013, Snappy Little Numbers, SLN 107)
- Schmew (LP) (2015, Greater Than Collectvive 015)
