= FortyTwenty =

- Origin: Lincoln, Nebraska, United States
- Genres: Country, cowbilly, honky-tonk
- Years active: 2002–present
- Labels: Slackjaw Records
- Website: FortyTwenty.com

FortyTwenty is a country rock band formed in Lincoln, Nebraska.

== Current members ==
- Jon Bradley: guitar/vocals
- J.J. King: drums/vocals
- Lern Tilton: upright bass/vocals
- David Wilson: fiddle/acoustic guitar/vocals, who has now moved on to the Cowboy Dave Band

== Albums ==
- Lowdown and Dirty (2003, Slackjaw Records)
- Sober and Stupid (2005, Slackjaw Records)
  - The album received significant radio play in various markets, reaching the No. 5 spot on the Freeform American Roots Chart, the No. 8 spot on the Euro-Americana Chart, and the No. 12 spot on XM Satellite Radio's X-Country Chart. The group recorded its 13-song disc with producer A.J. Mogis at Presto Studios in Lincoln, Nebraska.

== Country Music Television ==
In May 2004, FortyTwenty was invited to Nashville by Country Music Television to record four original acoustic songs for a segment called "New Voices, No Cover", which is now featured on FortyTwenty's CMT.com page.
