= Cory Ness =

American motorcycle designer

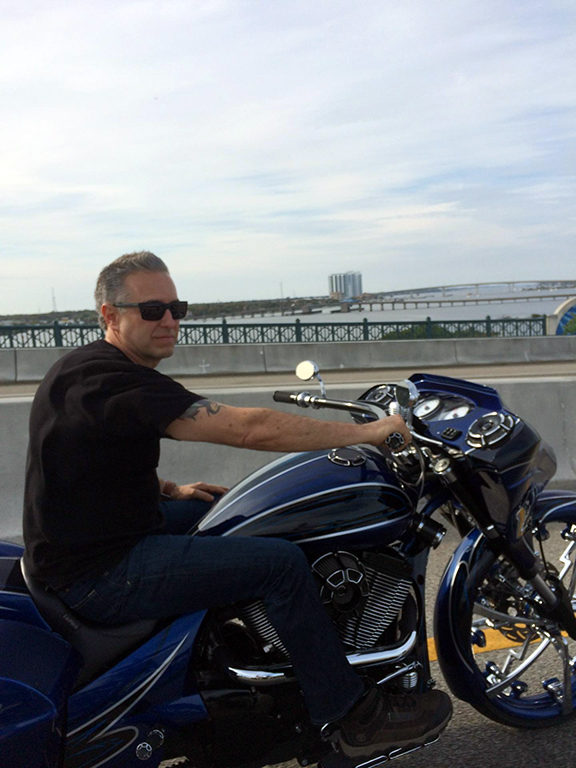
- Cory in Daytona 2014
- Born: August 11, 1963 (age 62); San Leandro, California
- Occupations: Motorcycle designer, entrepreneur
- Years active: 1980–present
- Known for: Custom motorcycles
- Relatives: Arlen Ness, Zach Ness
- Website: www.arlenness.com

Cory Ness (born August 11, 1963) is a second-generation American motorcycle designer and entrepreneur. He is the son of motorcycle customizer Arlen Ness, and father of Zach Ness.

Ness, following in his father's footsteps as a motorcycle enthusiast, became well known from his appearances on the Discovery Channel show Biker Build-Off in 2004 when he went head-to-head against his father and won. Ness appeared for a second time on the show in 2005, defeating Eric Gorges.
