= No, Not Me, Never =

Studio album by The Photo Atlas
- Released: 6 March 2007
- Recorded: 2006–2007
- Genre: Indie rock
- Length: 34:18
- Label: Stolen Transmission

Professional ratings
Review scores
Source	Rating
Allmusic	4.5/5 stars
IGN	6.9/10
PopMatters	7/10
Spin	7/10

No, Not Me, Never is the debut studio album by American indie rock band The Photo Atlas. The album was released in 2006 on the Morning After Records label but later re-released on 6 March 2007 on the Stolen Transmission record label. The song "Red Orange Yellow" was featured in video games Burnout Dominator and Burnout Paradise.

== Track listing ==
1. "Electric Shock" – 3:06
2. "Merit" – 3:17
3. "Light and Noise" – 3:58
4. "The Walls Have Eyes" – 3:28
5. "She Was a Matador" – 2:52
6. "Red Orange Yellow" – 3:09
7. "Broadcasting Feedback" – 3:12
8. "Little Tiny Explosions" – 3:52
9. "Cutback" – 3:23
10. "Handshake Heart Attack" – 3:30

== Personnel ==
The Photo Atlas

- Alan Andrews – lead vocals, guitar
- Bill Threlkeld III – guitar
- Mark Hawkins – bass guitar
- Devon Shirley – drums sampling

Technical personnel

- The Photo Atlas – production
- Andrew Vastola – production, engineering, mixing
- Adam Lancaster – production
- Daniel Rutherford – production
- Matt Sandoski – mastering
