= Dick's Sporting Goods Park =

Soccer stadium in Commerce City, Colorado, US

- DSG Park, Dick's, The Dick

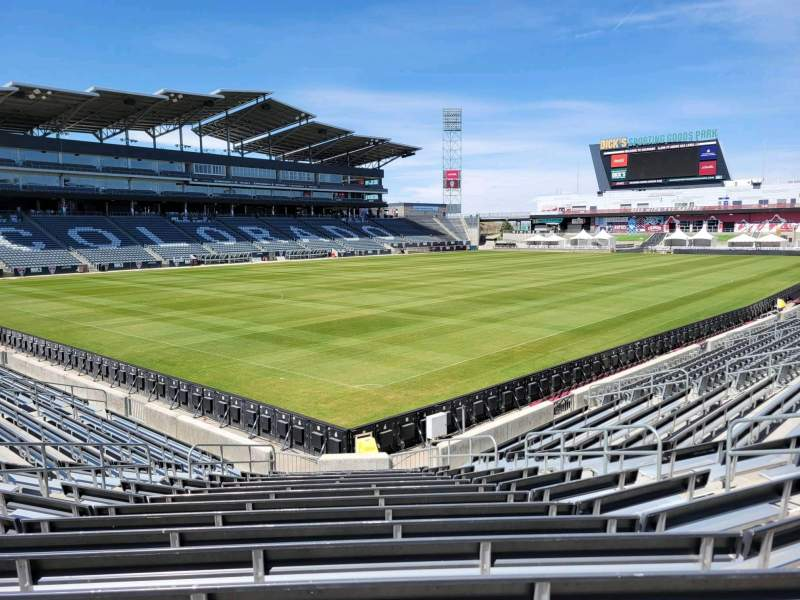
- The interior view of the stadium in 2023

- Location in Colorado Location in the United States Location in North America
- Interactive map of Dick's Sporting Goods Park
- Address: 6000 Victory Way
- Location: Commerce City, Colorado, U.S.
- Coordinates: 39°48′20″N 104°53′31″W
- Owner: City of Commerce City
- Operator: Kroenke Sports & Entertainment
- Capacity: 18,061 (soccer); 27,000 (concert)
- Surface: Kentucky Bluegrass
- Field size: 120 yds long x 75 yds

Construction
- Groundbreaking: September 28, 2005; 21 years ago
- Opened: April 7, 2007; 19 years ago
- Cost: $64.5 million ($100 million in 2025)
- Architect: HOK Sport (now Populous)
- Project manager: ICON Venue Group
- Structural engineers: Martin/Martin, Inc.
- Services engineers: Smith Seckman Reid, Inc.
- General contractor: Turner Construction

Tenants
- Colorado Rapids (MLS) (2007–present); Denver Dream (LFL) (2009)

Dick's Sporting Goods Park, also known as DSG Park, is a soccer-specific stadium in Commerce City, Colorado, that is home to the Colorado Rapids of Major League Soccer (MLS). The stadium seats up to 18,061 people for soccer matches, but can accommodate up to 19,734 for special soccer events and 27,000 for concerts. It became the third home venue for the Rapids upon its opening in 2007. Sitting at just over 5,200 feet (1,600 m) above sea level, the stadium has the highest elevation of any stadium regularly used by MLS teams.

In North American competitions, the stadium is known as Commerce City Stadium due to advertising rules.

== History ==
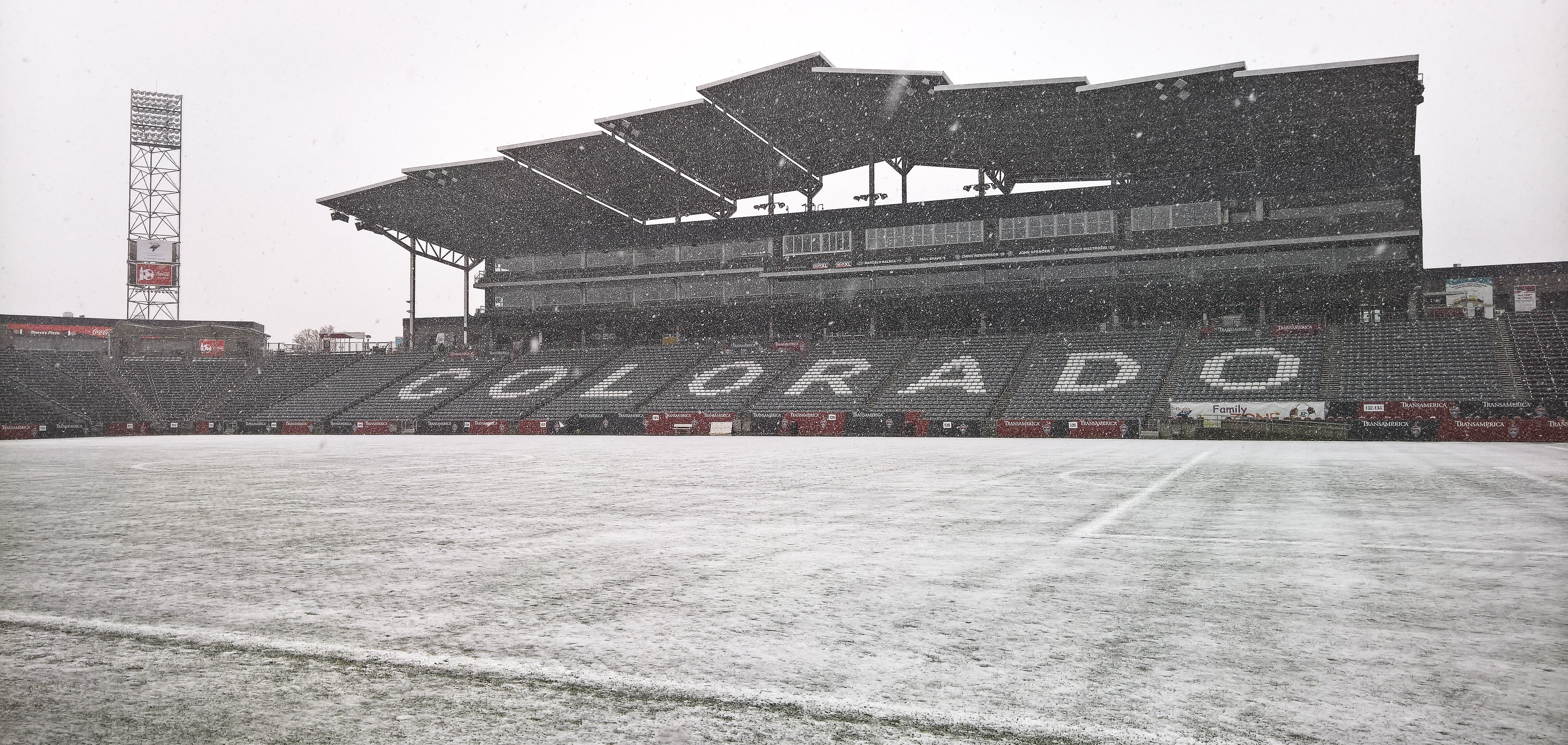
Situated near the base of the Rocky Mountains and sitting at an elevation over 5,200 feet above sea level (1,600 m), Dicks Sporting Goods Park has played host to several snow games.

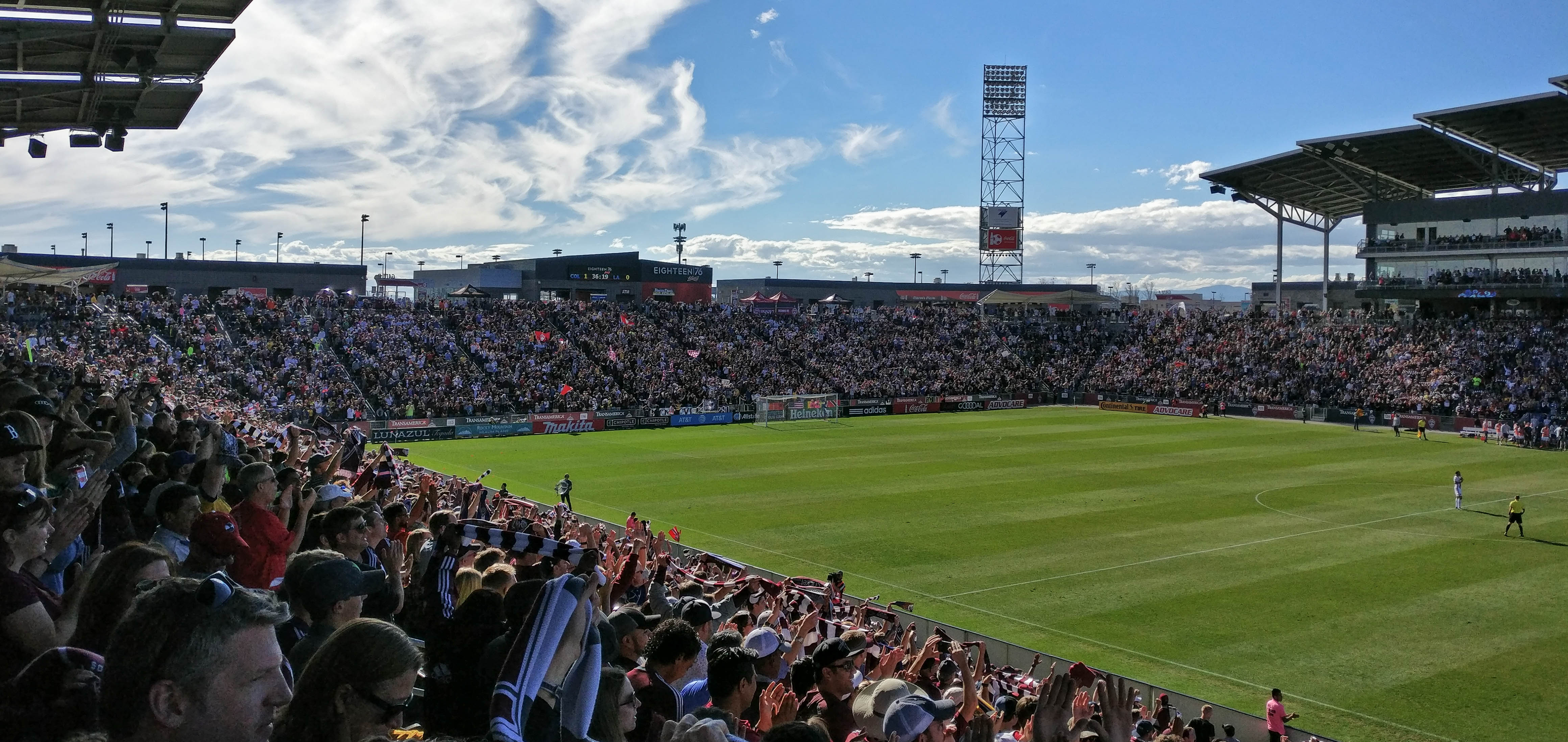
Dicks Sporting Goods Park

For their first eleven seasons, the Rapids played at Mile High Stadium (1996–2001) and Invesco Field at Mile High (2002–2006). In 2004, the club and city announced a $130 million project that would include youth soccer fields, retail development, and a new Commerce City civic center. The total cost of stadium construction was $64.5 million. Commerce City voters agreed to $65 million bond for infrastructure improvements to support the stadium. Construction began at the site, close to Denver's former Stapleton International Airport and bordered on the north and east by the Rocky Mountain Arsenal National Wildlife Refuge; to the south by 56th Avenue; and to the west by Quebec Street, in fall 2005. In November 2006, Dick's Sporting Goods signed a 20-year deal for naming rights.

The stadium opened with an intrasquad scrimmage open only to Commerce City residents and season ticket holders. The first official match was played against D.C. United on April 7, 2007, with the Rapids winning, 2–1 in the regular season opening game. Herculez Gomez scored the first goal at the stadium. In the stadium's inaugural year, it hosted the 2007 MLS All-Star Game as the MLS All-Stars defeated Scotland's Celtic FC.

The Rapids played their first playoff game at DSG Park on October 28, 2010; a 1–0 victory over the Columbus Crew. Two weeks later, a crowd of 17,779 was in attendance as the Rapids defeated the San Jose Earthquakes en route to their first-ever MLS Cup.

The stadium is owned by Commerce City and operated by Kroenke Sports & Entertainment (KSE) who also own the Colorado Avalanche, Denver Nuggets, and the Colorado Mammoth.

The stadium is noted for its poor video board which has had serious issues, visible in photos since at least 2022, with pixelization and color inconsistency.

== International soccer matches ==
=== Men's matches ===
Date	Team #1	Result	Team #2	Competition	Attendance
August 22, 2007	Mexico	0–1	Colombia	Friendly	17,000
November 19, 2008	United States	2–0	Guatemala	2010 World Cup qualification	9,303
March 11, 2009	Mexico	5–1	Bolivia	Friendly	18,296
March 22, 2013	United States	1–0	Costa Rica	2014 World Cup qualification	19,374
September 9, 2014	Mexico	1–0	Bolivia	Friendly	18,136
October 3, 2015	Canada U-23	2–2	Cuba U-23	2015 Olympic Qualifying	3,313
October 3, 2015	United States U-23	4–0	Panama U-23	2015 Olympic Qualifying	3,313
May 29, 2016	Brazil	2–0	Panama	Friendly	11,000
June 8, 2017	United States	2–0	Trinidad and Tobago	2018 World Cup qualification	19,188
October 14, 2025	United States	2–1	Australia	Friendly	18,218

=== Women's matches ===
Date	Team #1	Result	Team #2	Competition	Attendance
July 13, 2008	United States	1–0	Brazil	Friendly	15,071
September 19, 2012	United States	6–2	Australia	Friendly	18,589
April 6, 2014	United States	2–0	China	Friendly	14,903
June 2, 2016	United States	3–3	Japan	Friendly	18,572
September 15, 2017	United States	3–1	New Zealand	Friendly	17,301
April 4, 2019	United States	5–3	Australia	Friendly	17,264
June 25, 2022	United States	3–0	Colombia	Friendly	17,143
June 1, 2024	United States	4–0	South Korea	Friendly	19,010
June 26, 2025	United States	4–0	Republic of Ireland	Friendly	18,504
April 17, 2026	United States	3–0	Japan	Friendly	17,589

== Rugby union ==
The stadium has hosted several high-profile rugby games. In 2009, it hosted several matches of the 2009 Churchill Cup, including the United States v. Georgia, Canada v. Argentina XV, and England Saxons v. Ireland Wolfhounds. The Denver Barbarians of Rugby Super League have hosted occasional home matches at the stadium. On September 14, 2025 it hosted an international triple header including the knockout phases of the 2025 World Rugby Pacific Nations Cup and USA's 2027 Rugby World Cup qualifier against Samoa.

Date	Home	Score	Away	Event	Attendance	Ref.
June 21, 2009	United States	31–13	Georgia	2009 Churchill Cup	5,225	
June 21, 2009	Canada	29–44	Argentina XV	2009 Churchill Cup	5,225	
June 21, 2009	Ireland Wolfhounds	49–22	England A	2009 Churchill Cup	5,225	
June 9, 2018	United States	62–13	Russia	2018 June rugby union tests		
September 14, 2025	United States	29–13	Samoa	2025 World Rugby Pacific Nations Cup	est. 6,452	
September 14, 2025	Japan	62–24	Tonga	2025 World Rugby Pacific Nations Cup	est. 6,452	
September 14, 2025	Fiji	63–10	Canada	2025 World Rugby Pacific Nations Cup	est. 6,452	
July 4, 2026	Tonga	36–26	Zimbabwe	2026 World Rugby Nations Cup Americas-Pacific	est. 10,500	
July 4, 2026	United States	30–29	Portugal	2026 World Rugby Nations Cup Americas-Pacific	est. 10,500	

== Other sports events ==
In May 2009, the stadium hosted the Men's Collegiate Lacrosse Association National Championships with the Michigan Wolverines defeating Chapman University 12–11 in overtime on the Division I side and University of St. Thomas beating the University of Dayton 16–11 in Division II.

The Denver Dream of the Lingerie Football League played their two home games at the stadium during their lone season.

The stadium held the 2014 World Lacrosse Championship during July 10–19, 2014.

On Friday, March 22, 2013, Dick's Sporting Goods Park was the site of the World Cup CONCACAF 2014 qualifying match between Costa Rica and USA, a game played in blizzard conditions. Costa Rica filed a protest with FIFA due to field conditions when the United States won the game 1–0, but the protest was denied. The game has already been dubbed in football lore as "SnowClásico" for the conditions.

== Music events ==
The venue grounds hosted the Mile High Music Festival annually from 2008 to 2010. The first Mile High Music Festival had attendance of approximately 40,000 people each day over the course of two days. By utilizing the open soccer fields surrounding the stadium and additional stages throughout the complex, the complex's total capacity was able to greatly exceed what the stadium could hold alone.

The rock band Phish established an annual three-night residency at the venue over Labor Day Weekend, starting in 2011 and returning each year since (with the exceptions of 2020, due to the COVID-19 pandemic, and 2025, when they played Folsom Field). In 2022, the residency expanded to four nights. Phish's lead singer, Trey Anastasio, noted "We all love Dicks!"

Date	Artist(s)	Opening act(s)	Tour	Tickets sold	Revenue	Additional notes
July 20, 2008	Dave Matthews Band	Brett Dennen; OneRepublic; Rodrigo y Gabriela; John Mayer	2008 Summer Tour	—	—	This concert was part of the Mile High Music Festival. LeRoi Moore did not play due to injury. This show was recorded and released as Live at Mile High Music Festival on December 16, 2008.
August 15, 2010	Dave Matthews Band	Drive-By Truckers; Jimmy Cliff; My Morning Jacket	2010 Summer Tour	—	—	This concert was part of the Mile High Music Festival and was webcast live.
August 23, 2013	Dave Matthews Band	Snoop Dogg	2013 Summer Tour	—	—	Due to severe thunderstorms in the area, the gates didn't open for the first show until 6:45. Snoop Dogg went on at 7:15, and DMB went on at 8:40.
August 24, 2013	Dave Matthews Band	Snoop Dogg	2013 Summer Tour	—	—	Due to severe thunderstorms in the area, the gates didn't open for the first show until 6:45. Snoop Dogg went on at 7:15, and DMB went on at 8:40.
May 9, 2014	Kaskade					
July 29–30, 2016	Bassnectar					
September 9, 2016	Luke Bryan	Little Big Town; Dustin Lynch	Kill the Lights Tour	33,792 / 40,000	$2,926,618	
September 10, 2016	Luke Bryan	Little Big Town; Dustin Lynch	Kill the Lights Tour	33,792 / 40,000	$2,926,618	
August 16, 2021	Guns N' Roses	Mammoth WVH	Guns N' Roses 2020 Tour	TBA	TBA	
August 25, 2021	Green Day; Fall Out Boy; Weezer	The Interrupters	Hella Mega Tour	TBA	TBA	This event, originally scheduled for July 28, 2020, was postponed due to the COVID-19 pandemic
September 5, 2022	Imagine Dragons	Macklemore	Mercury World Tour	22,258 / 22,258	$2,414,319	
August 9, 2027	Slipknot	Bring Me The Horizon; Loathe	(sic)est Stadium Tour	/		

== See also ==
- Lists of stadiums
- List of soccer stadiums in the United States

Events and tenants
Preceded by Invesco Field at Mile High	Home of the Colorado Rapids; 2007–present	Succeeded by Current
Preceded by Texas Stadium	Host of the Men's Collegiate Lacrosse Association; Championships; 2009–2011	Succeeded by Sirrine Stadium
