= Speakeasy Tiger =

US musical group

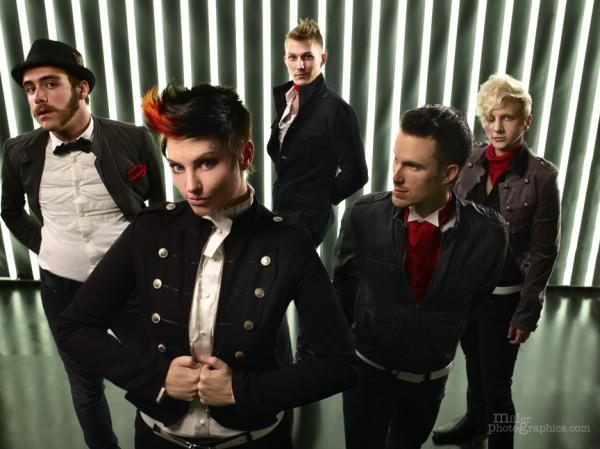

Background information
- Origin: Denver, Colorado, U.S.
- Genres: Pop, rock, electronic
- Years active: 2008–2010
- Labels: Unsigned
- Members: Lucas Gordon; Lauren Gale; Tavis Alley
- Past members: Katrina Stone; Kyle Simmons; Brett Peters; Elliott Peters; Peter Schmidt
- Website: http://www.speakeasytiger.com

Speakeasy Tiger was an American pop band from Denver, Colorado.

Speakeasy Tiger was founded in 2008 by Kyle Simmons (vocals), Peter Schmidt (piano, synth, keytar) and Lauren Gale (bass). Shortly thereafter members Lucas Gordon (drums) and Tavis Alley (guitar) were recruited to finish the band's lineup. In early 2010 vocalist Kyle Simmons left Speakeasy Tiger and was replaced by frontwoman Katrina Stone. In the fall of 2010 the group announced it would take an indefinite hiatus after members Katrina Stone and Peter Schmidt left the band.

== History ==
=== Formation and debut album (2008–2010) ===
In the summer of 2008 original vocalist Kyle Simmons took her solo folk project Girl Named Kyle in a different direction, pairing with Peter Schmidt and Lauren Gale to form a backing band for her improvised compositions. Soon after the Denver-based group changed its name to Speakeasy Tiger after making the decision to change genres of music from folk to pop.

The name Speakeasy Tiger was derived as a satirical play on the words speakeasy and blind tiger, which individually are both slang for the reference of illegal establishments selling alcohol during Prohibition. Original vocalist Kyle Simmons is quoted saying:

The name Speakeasy Tiger is a sort of passive aggressive term. I think of 'Tiger' as aggressive and 'Speakeasy' as more passive. The combination of words suits the members of this band perfectly and the kind of impact we're trying to create.

— Kyle Simmons,

The group began looking for members to finish the line up in November 2008. They found drummer Lucas Gordon hailing from Colorado Springs, Colorado, having previously played in the metalcore band The Murder Formula. Promptly after, guitarist Tavis Alley, who attended Brigham Young University at the time, was recruited to the Mile High City to finish the line up after responding to a Facebook ad from the band looking for guitarists.

Lucas Gordon comments on the change:

The change has been immense. We don’t recognize it all the time when we’re with each other most of each day, but when you step back to look at where Speakeasy Tiger started and the impact we’ve been able to make on the public in such a short time it’s one of the most fulfilling thoughts I can think of. That’s the reason why we make music- not only for our own lives but also to influence the lives of others.

— Lucas Gordon,

Speakeasy Tiger released its debut album The Public on July 11, 2009. The album was an immediate success reaching the College Music Journal Billboard top 200 albums chart. It peaked at position 142 and was a top 20 add for the week of August 29, 2009.

In November 2009, the group went back into the studio to remaster the single off The Public entitled "Oil Rising" at The Blasting Room in Fort Collins, Colorado, with producer Lee Miles. The single was released in April 2010 shortly before the departure of vocalist Kyle Simmons.

=== Addition & Departure of Katrina Stone (2010) ===
In May 2010 after rumors of vocalist Kyle Simmons' struggles with other band mates the band revealed the vocalist's departure from the band. After canceling a string of tour dates, the group took a small hiatus to search for a new vocalist. In June 2010 Speakeasy Tiger announced the addition of frontwoman Katrina Stone as an indefinite member while assuring they would not be canceling summer tour dates on The Vans Warped Tour.

Not long after the tour, however, Schmidt and Stone announced to the band that they were quitting, providing little explanation why. The band was in pre-production on a new EP at the time, but the project has since been abandoned.

Speakeasy Tiger has since been on hiatus.

In 2022, vocalist Kyle Simmons died aged 34.

== Musical style and influences ==
- Speakeasy Tiger blends a mix of several different genres together including American rock, pop, post-Britpop, and electro. Band members have stated various musical influences including Freddie Mercury, Cyndi Lauper, BT, Coldplay, The Killers, and Jimmy Eat World.
- Speakeasy Tiger has been hailed for its use of the Keytar, an instrument which was popular in the early 1980s.
- Fans and critics have often compared the group to Muse, The Killers, Paramore, No Doubt, and Blondie

=== Music with a voice ===
Band members have stated that when writing music, they feel compelled to create music that manifests feelings of love, compassion, and caring in listeners. The group has teamed with various non-profit organizations including Keep A Breast and online blogs including Vans Girls Blog to promote a national sense of community through music.

Drummer Lucas Gordon quotes:

We make music we love.

With the people we love.

For the people we love.

— Lucas Gordon,

== Band members ==
=== Current members ===
- Lucas Gordon- Drums (2008 – present)
- Lauren Gale- Bass (2008 – present)
- Tavis Alley- Guitar (2008 – present)

=== Former members ===
- Peter Schmidt- Piano, Synth, Keytar (2008–2010)
- Katrina Stone- Vocals (2010)
- Kyle Simmons- Vocals (2008–2010)
- Elliott Peters- Guitar (2008–2008)
- Brett Peters- Drums (2008–2008)

== Discography ==
- The Sore Throat EP (2008)
- The Public (2009)
- Oil Rising- single version (2010)

=== Compilations ===
- Alter the Press 2009 Compilation
- KKBB Summer 2010 Compilation

== Tours and festivals ==
- Independently toured western United States September 2009
- Independently toured the Southern United States October 2009
- Independently toured the midwestern United States November 2009
- Monolith Music Festival 2009 *Monolith Festival 2009 Promo Video*
- Vans Warped Tour 2010 appearing on the Kia Kevin Says Stage

== Interviews and press ==
- KCSU Top 25 albums of 2009
- 303 Magazine: Speakeasy Tiger Gone Hunting
- Absolutepunk.net Unsigned Showcase: Speakeasy Tiger
- Alternative Press Issue 265: Warped Tour
