= SoundRabbit =

- Origin: Boulder, Colorado, United States
- Genres: Alternative Rock
- Years active: 2007–present
- Labels: Independent
- Website: www.soundrabbit.com

SoundRabbit is an American alternative rock band from just outside Boulder, CO. The band came together in 2007 and released their debut, This Room Becomes A Crowd, in November of that year. The genre spanning roots rock album gained enough traction for the band to begin touring in early 2008.

With the release of their first album, the band also implemented the Backstage. The subscription based project was a way for fans to access to the band's entire catalog of music (live and studio), videos, photos, blogs and other exclusive material. In turn the band would donate a percentage of its proceeds to various charities and causes. The model would encourage fans to be making more of a donation and difference rather than just purchasing a CD.

In 2009, the band released their second album Tree Trunk Airplanes, a rocking and moodier effort, and resumed a healthy touring schedule over the next two years. While touring the country, they shared the stage with the likes of Sharon Jones & The Dap-Kings, Keller Williams, The Avett Brothers, and local bluegrass boys Oakhurst, just to name a few.

The band traveled to Charlottesville, Virginia in April 2010 to begin the recording process for their third independent release. They spent ten days holed up in an old cabin (circa 1750), writing and recording what ultimately became a full-length album, Don't Forget To Remember. The first four singles were released in March 2012 - "The Odds of Waking Up," "Sister, Brother," "Sand & Stone," and "September."

== History ==
2007-2008

After forming in 2007, the band didn't waste any time building a buzz. In February 2008 they were awarded "Best Pop/Rock Release By A New Band" by the Mile High Music Store in Denver for their debut album. A month later they were touring out west centered around two big shows in Arizona. The first playing the Circle K Main Stage at the Tempe Music Festival in Tempe opening for Fergie of The Black Eyed Peas, My Chemical Romance, Cowboy Mouth and the Gin Blossoms. That same weekend they headlined a Habitat For Humanity benefit concert at Arizona State University.

In April 2008, they toured the Midwest and Northeast, playing shows from Des Moines to Cambridge where they headlined at the famed Middle East with indie band American Princes. Upon returning to Colorado, they were featured at a benefit concert for Colorado State University's Alternative Spring Break to close out their spring tour. By May, the band had already raised thousands of dollars for charities including the American Cancer Society, Leukemia & Lymphoma Society, the National Kidney Foundation, the March of Dimes, Habitat For Humanity, and others, through their Backstage fan-supported charity program.

September became one of the bigger months for the band. They were invited to headline the "Welcome Back" concert for the University of Colorado, grabbed a spot for Colorado's Rock The Vote event and a main stage slot at the legendary Red Rocks Amphitheatre for the Monolith Festival with such acts as TV On The Radio, DeVotchKa, Sharon Jones & The Dap-Kings and The Avett Brothers.

== Discography ==
=== Studio albums ===
- This Room Becomes A Crowd (2007)
- Tree Trunk Airplanes (2009)
- Don't Forget To Remember (2012)

=== Live albums ===
- SoundRabbit Duo Acoustic, Live in Boulder (2012)
