= The Railbenders =

American country band

- Origin: Denver, Colorado, United States
- Genres: Alt country, country rock
- Years active: 2000–present
- Label: Whiskey Road Records
- Members: Jim Dalton, Tyson Murray, Graham Haworth, Tony "Nascar" Asnicar
- Website: www.railbenders.com

The Railbenders are an American country band formed in Denver, Colorado in 2000 by Jim Dalton and Tyson Murray. Westword Music Showcase named The Railbenders to be Denver's Top Country/Roots act in 2002 and 2003, they were also named "Best of the Underground" in 2004 by The Denver Post. Also in 2004, The Coors Brewing Company named The Railbenders The Coors Original 2004 New Sound Throwdown Champions which included a sponsorship.

The Railbenders have opened for Willie Nelson, ZZ Top, Peter Frampton, The Doobie Brothers Kenny Rogers, Charlie Daniels and Nickel Creek.

== History ==
=== Music festivals ===
In 2007, The Railbenders performed at the Stagecoach Country Music Festival in Indio, CA, where they opened a stage that featured Emmylou Harris, Kris Kristofferson, Junior Brown, John Doe, Drive-By Truckers, and Alejandro Escovedo. In 2008 The Railbenders were the only country music act at the Mile High Music Festival in Denver.

== Musical style ==
Influenced by Johnny Cash, Waylon Jennings and Hank Williams, The Railbenders overall sound has been described as country, alt-country, outlaw country, and hard country. The members of The Railbenders all listened to punk rock growing up which they believe explains their musics harder edge. Many of the band's songs include the common themes of whiskey, women and Colorado.

== Band members ==
Current members

- Jim Dalton - vocals, guitar
- Tyson Murray - upright bass
- Graham Haworth - drums
- Tony "Nascar" Asnicar - guitar

Former members

- Gordon Beesley - drums
- Chris Flynn - guitar
- Glenn Taylor - pedal steel
- Zach Boddicker - guitar

== Discography ==
- Southbound - Released: Apr 24, 2001, Big Bender Records
- Segundo - Released: Aug 22, 2004, Big Bender Records
- Showdown - Released: Jan 19, 2006, Railbenders
- Rock 'n' Rail New Year's Eve - Released: Dec 31, 2007, Railbenders
- Like a Wheel - Released: Dec 11, 2009, Whiskey Road Records
- Time to Ride (single) - Released: Jan 20, 2014, James Dalton
- The Medicine Show - Released: December 15, 2017, Railbenders
