= Victory Motorcycles =

Defunct American motorcycle brand

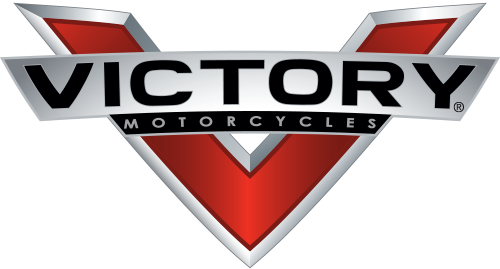
- Industry: Motorcycle
- Founded: 1997; 29 years ago
- Headquarters: Spirit Lake, Iowa, USA
- Production output: 1999–2017
- Owner: Polaris Inc.
- Parent: Polaris Inc.
- Website: www.victorymotorcycles.com

Victory Motorcycles was an American motorcycle brand based in Spirit Lake, Iowa, United States. It began selling its vehicles in 1998, and began winding down operations in January 2017 to be succeeded by the revived traditional American motorcycle brand Indian, both of which were owned by parent company Polaris Industries.

Polaris, an American manufacturer of snowmobiles and all-terrain vehicles, created Victory following the modern success of Harley-Davidson. Victory's motorcycles were designed to compete directly with Harley-Davidson and similar American-style motorcycle brands, with V-twin engines and touring, sport-touring, and cruiser configurations. The first Victory, the V92C, was announced in 1997 and began selling in 1998. Victory became profitable in 2002 and remained so for a number of years, but it failed to turn a profit three of its last five years, due to a lack of investment in the brand, preferring to release new model years with no changes to successful models other than paint, and unsuccessful investments in electric and three wheeled motorcycles.

== Background ==
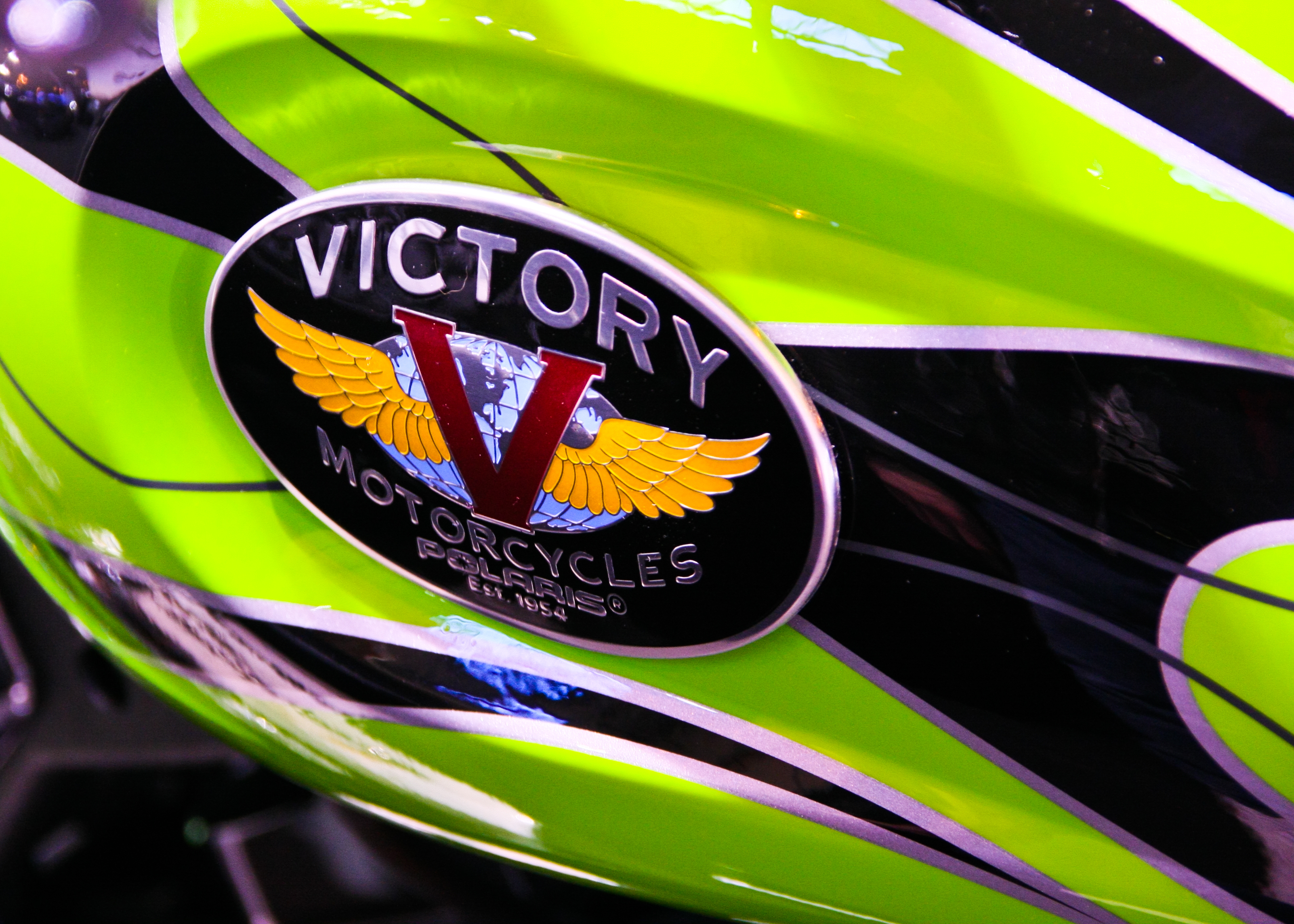
Victory Logo

Polaris, a Medina, Minnesota company with annual sales in 2015 of $4.7 billion, is one of the earliest manufacturers of snowmobiles. Polaris also manufactures ATVs, side-by-side off-road vehicles, electric vehicles and, until 2004, personal watercraft. Seeking to diversify its product line, and observing the sales enjoyed by Harley-Davidson and similar manufacturers, the company decided to produce a large motorcycle built entirely in the United States.

Victory vehicles follow the traditional American style of a heavier motorcycle that increasingly became associated with the Harley-Davidson brand in economically advanced nations after the Second World War, rather than more modern racing-inspired designs.

Polaris began its research and development of manufacturing a motorcycle in the early 1990s. They completed extensive research that included testing numerous different makes and models of motorcycles. This research provided them with guidance ranging from comfort to braking ability, which became the framework to design a motorcycle that combined the best of each research criteria. Polaris was on a mission to create an American-made, cruiser-style motorcycle. This new creation was branded with the name Victory.

Victory's debut cruiser model, V92C, had a 92 cubic-inch (1,507 cc) counterbalanced, fuel-injected V-twin motor. In its debut in 1998, the V92C became the largest displacement engine offered in the cruiser market. The new Victory motorcycle was unique in its appearance. The fenders and tank profile mimicked the retro-look of sweeping lines from 1930s-era cars.

In 2010, Polaris engaged in a major expansion of production and marketing of the motorcycle. In 2011 Polaris bought the Indian Motorcycle brand.

== Models ==
=== V92C ===
The first model, the V92C, was debuted at Planet Hollywood in the Mall of America by Al Unser Jr. in 1997. Production began starting on 4 July 1998 for the 1999 model that was the first official model year. At 92 cu in (1,510 cc), the V92C was the second largest production motorcycle engine available at the time, and sparked a race among motorcycle manufacturers to build bigger and bigger engines. All components for the V92C were manufactured in Minnesota and Iowa, except the Italian Brembo brakes and the British-made electronic fuel injection system. Victory engines debuted with five-speed transmissions (later six), single overhead cams, dual connecting rods, hydraulic lifters, and fuel injection; most fuel-injection components are standard GM parts. The V92C engine was designed to be easily tuned by the owner.

The 92 cu in (1,510 cc) Victory engine carries 6 US qt (5,700 ml) of oil in the sump, about the same as most automobiles. This is intended to minimize risk of low-oil damage, but also makes it dimensionally larger than other motorcycle engines, such as Harley-Davidson, which carry the oil in an external tank. Top speed is about 120 mph (190 km/h) at 5,500 rpm; the ECM contains a rev limiter which can be overridden by reprogramming the EPROM. The Victory engine is air-cooled, and also circulates crankcase oil through a cooler mounted between the front frame downtubes. A section of the rear swingarm can be removed to change the drive belt or the rear wheel.

The motorcycle's designers had approached several European manufacturers, particularly Cosworth, about designing and producing the engine, but ultimately decided to design and build it in Osceola, Wisconsin. Several variations on engine-frame geometry were tried until the best configuration was found, with the crankshaft geometrically aligned with the axles, a concept that had been standard practice for the past 100 years. The V92C weighed about the same as a Harley, approximately 650 lb (290 kg). The original V92C engine produced about 55 hp (41 kW) at the wheel, equivalent to a 1964 Sportster; with high-performance cams and pistons, this could be boosted to 83 hp (62 kW) and torque of 86 lb⋅ft (117 N⋅m).

In 2002, the Freedom Engine was introduced. It had the same dimensions as the old engine but higher power output, and with rounded cylinders and smaller oil cooler it was much more attractive visually. The V92C became known as the Classic Cruiser, and was phased out of the model lineup after the 2003 model year. There was also a Special Edition version featuring special upgrades in 2000 and 2001 model years, and Deluxe models for several years.

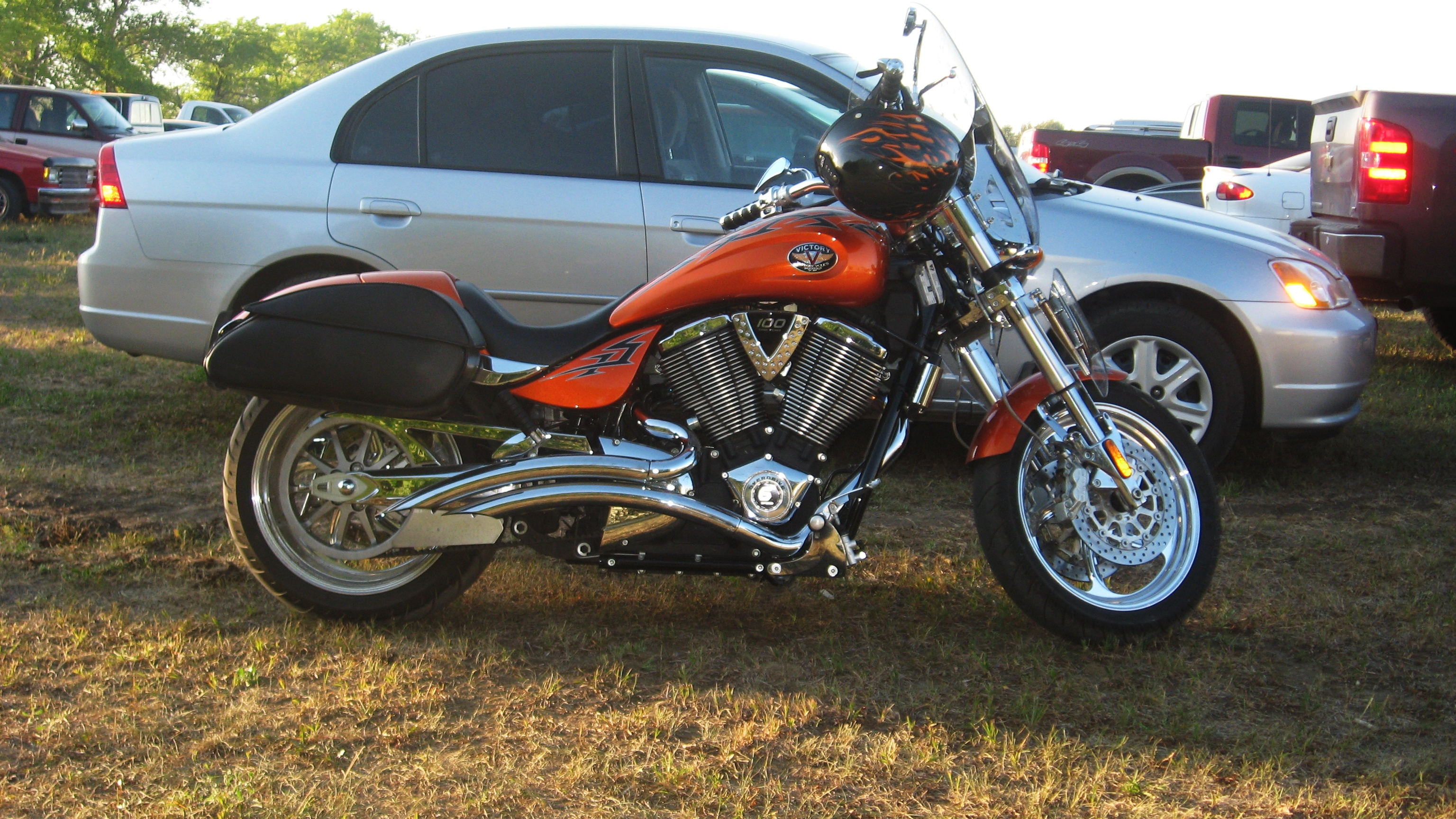

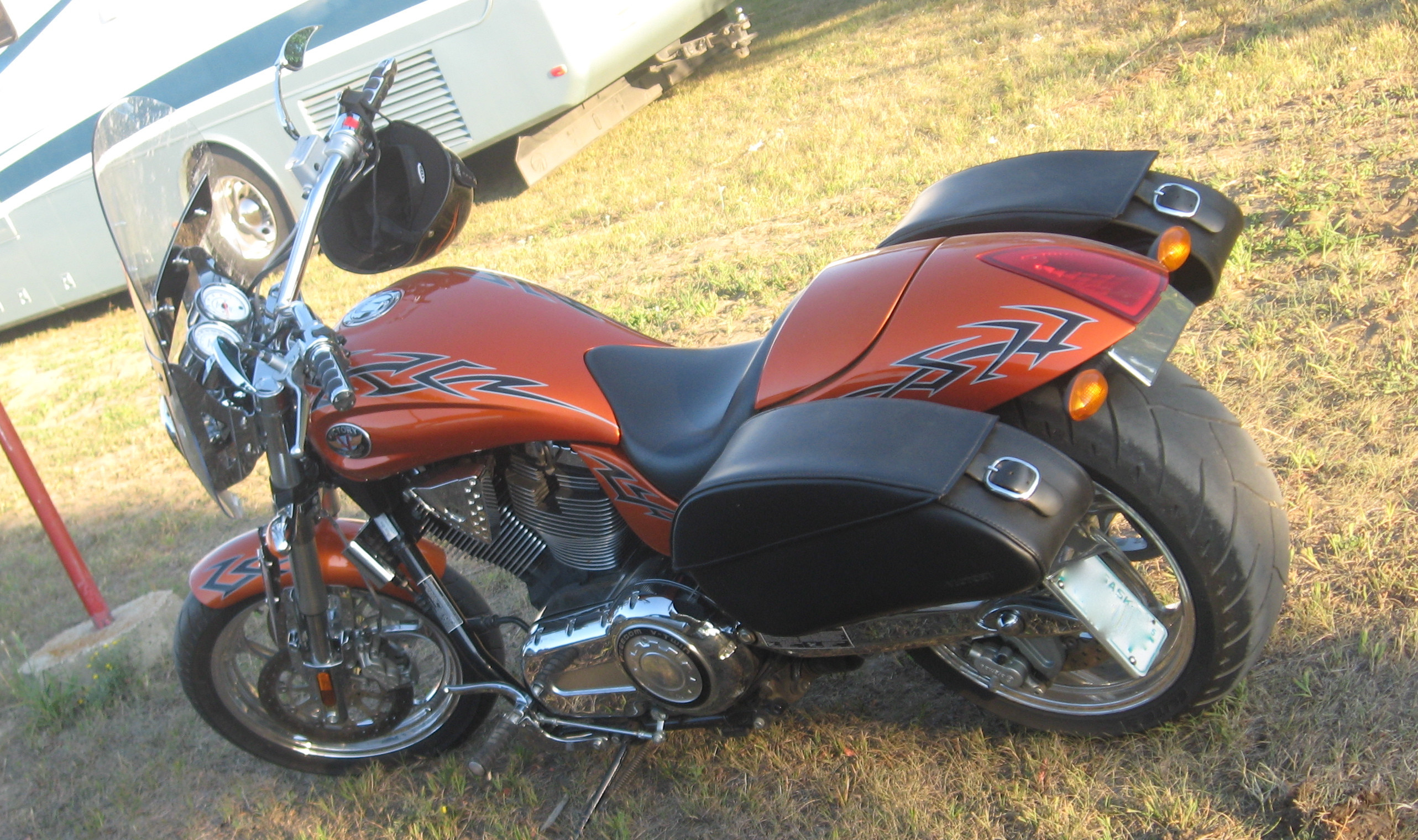

=== V92SC SportCruiser ===
Offered in 2000 and 2001, the V92SC SportCruiser offered higher ground clearance, adjustable via a simple 2-position bolt setup on the frame under the seat. It met a weaker than expected market, and did not sell well.

=== V92TC Touring Cruiser ===
Offered from 2002 through 2006, the TC featured a longer swingarm, large hard saddlebags, a re-designed seat, and sometimes the new Freedom Engine. The relatively tall seat height and roomy ergonomics made the bike ideal for larger riders. The Freedom Engine displaced 92 cu in (1,510 cc), but put out significantly more power and torque than the original engine. The 2002 model and later TC also accepted the 100 cu in (1,600 cc) big-bore kit, which increased torque further with the addition of upgraded exhaust. Later models featured rubber mounted handlebars and revised suspension settings. Deluxe versions (V92TCD) were also available with extra features popular at the time. With the deletion of the Touring Cruiser at the end of the 2006 model year, the last of the original V92 motorcycles was retired from the lineup.

=== Vegas ===
In 2003, Victory introduced the Vegas. The Vegas was designed by Victory designer Michael Song, and offered a totally new chassis design. The Freedom engine carried forward from the TC, but the rest of the bike incorporated new features. The Vegas debuted with the 92 cu in (1,510 cc) engine and 5-speed transmission, but was upgraded to a 100 cu in (1,600 cc) engine and 6-speed transmission for the 2006 model year. The Vegas Low has a 1 in (25 mm) lower seat, repositioned foot pegs, and handlebars 2 in (51 mm) further back than the regular Vegas model.

The Vegas is considered part of Victory's Custom Cruisers.

2010 Vegas Specs
100 cu in (1,600 cc) engine produces 85 hp (63 kW) and 106 lb⋅ft (144 N⋅m) torque
Engine: four-stroke 50° V-Twin
Fuel capacity: 4.5 US gal (17 L; 3.7 imp gal)
Fuel System: Electronic fuel injection with dual 45 mm throttle body
Primary Drive: Gear drive with torque compensator
Transmission: six-speed constant mesh
Final Drive: Carbon Fiber Reinforced Belt

=== Vegas 8-Ball ===
The Vegas 8-Ball was powdercoated in black where the Vegas had been chromed. It debuted with the 92 cu in (1,510 cc) engine, and was upgraded to 100 cu in (1,600 cc) in 2006. Beginning with the 2011 model year, the Vegas 8-Ball received the 6 speed transmission from the standard Vegas.

The Vegas 8-Ball is considered part of Victory's 8-Ball Cruisers.

2010 Vegas 8-Ball Specs
106 cu in (1,740 cc) engine produces 94 hp (70 kW) and 106 lb⋅ft (144 N⋅m) torque
Engine: four-stroke 50° V-Twin
Fuel capacity: 4.5 US gal (17 L; 3.7 imp gal)
Fuel System: Electronic Fuel Injection with dual 45 mm throttle body
Primary Drive: Gear drive with torque compensator
Transmission: five-speed constant mesh
Final Drive: Carbon Fiber Reinforced Belt

=== High Ball ===
First introduced in 2012, is reminiscent of a bobber. It features apehanger handlebars, wire wheels and suede black & white paintwork with painted on logos rather than badges. For 2014 two options became available. The aforementioned paint scheme came with Judge cast alloy wheels. And a new paint scheme of suede black with red flames appeared, keeping the wire wheels. Both versions feature a Judge headlight, replacing the previous headlight, which many people felt looked out of place on this style of bike.

=== Gunner ===
Introduced in February 2014 as a traditional "bobber" style of bike. With more muscle, (106 cubic inches) pound for pound the " Victory Gunner " leads the competition in the latest lineup of Cruiser style motorcycles currently on the market.

=== Kingpin/Kingpin Deluxe/Kingpin Tour ===
Following on the success of the Vegas, the Kingpin was released in 2004. Victory took advantage of the greater tuning capacity of cartridge forks, and revised both front and rear spring rates and damping to improve ride quality. The Kingpin Deluxe added luxury items to attract riders looking for more comfort. The Kingpin and Kingpin Deluxe began with the 92 cu in (1,510 cc) engine and five-speed transmission, but were upgraded to the 100 cu in (1,600 cc) engine and 6-speed transmission for the 2006 model year. For 2007 the Kingpin Tour was added, which was a Deluxe outfitted with an integrated tour pack or trunk. The Kingpin Tour was added when the Touring Cruiser was dropped.

The Kingpin is considered part of Victory's Custom Cruisers.

2010 Kingpin Specs
100 cu in (1,600 cc) engine produces 85 hp (63 kW) and 106 lb⋅ft (144 N⋅m) torque
Engine: four-stroke 50° V-Twin
Fuel capacity: 4.5 US gal (17 L; 3.7 imp gal) | Fuel Capacity on 8-Ball: 4.5 US gal (17 L; 3.7 imp gal)
Fuel System: Electronic Fuel Injection with dual 45mm throttle body
Primary Drive: Gear drive with torque compensator
Transmission: six-speed constant mesh
Final Drive: Carbon Fiber Reinforced Belt

=== Kingpin 8-Ball ===
The Kingpin 8-Ball is based upon the Kingpin platform, and like the Vegas 8-Ball is black, with black highlights in place of the chrome highlights of the standard Kingpin Model. It carries the 100 cu in (1,600 cc) motor, and has a 5 speed gearbox. It is considered to be a "blank canvas" and thus is popular with motorcycle customizers.

The Kingpin 8-Ball is considered part of Victory's 8-Ball Cruisers.

2010 Kingpin 8-Ball Specs
100 cu in (1,600 cc) engine produces 85 hp (63 kW) and 106 lb⋅ft (144 N⋅m) of torque
Engine: four-stroke 50° V-Twin
Fuel capacity: 4.5 US gal (17 L; 3.7 imp gal)
Fuel System: Electronic Fuel Injection with dual 45mm throttle body
Primary Drive: Gear drive with torque compensator
Transmission: five-speed constant mesh
Final Drive: Carbon Fiber Reinforced Belt

=== Hammer ===
Introduced in 2005, The Hammer is considered part of Victory's Muscle Cruiser line. The very wide rear tire was both a visual design feature and also intended to reduce wheel spin due to the tremendous engine torque. This very wide tire has caused unusual low-speed handling characteristics due to the tires squared-off profile.

2010 Hammer/Hammer Sl Specs
106 cu in (1,740 cc) engine produces 97 hp (72 kW) and 113 lb⋅ft (153 N⋅m) torque
Engine: four-stroke 50° V-Twin
Fuel capacity: 4.5 US gal (17 L; 3.7 imp gal)
Fuel System: Electronic Fuel Injection with dual 45mm throttle body
Primary Drive: Gear drive with torque compensator
Transmission: six-speed constant mesh
Final Drive: Carbon Fiber Reinforced Belt

=== Hammer 8-Ball ===
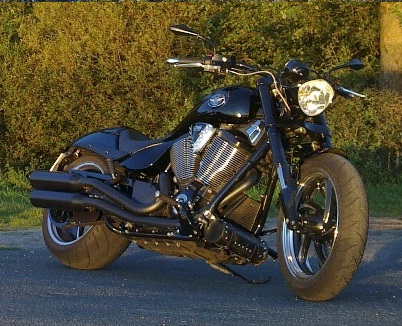
Victory Hammer Eight-Ball

In 2010, Victory released the Hammer 8-ball. With a lowered seat and smaller engine the bike is marketed as a cheaper and less loaded alternative to the Hammer and the Hammer S. It was one of the few bikes in Victory's lineup that remained a 5-speed. The 2011 model was upgraded to the 106 cu inch engine and 6 speed gearbox

The Hammer 8-Ball is considered part of Victory's 8-Ball Cruisers.

2010 Hammer 8-Ball Specs
100 cu in (1,600 cc) engine produces 85 hp (63 kW) and 106 lb⋅ft (144 N⋅m) torque
Engine: four-stroke 50° V-Twin
Fuel capacity: 4.5 US gal (17 L; 3.7 imp gal)
Fuel System: Electronic Fuel Injection with dual 45mm throttle body
Primary Drive: Gear drive with torque compensator
Transmission: five-speed constant mesh
Final Drive: Carbon Fiber Reinforced Belt

2012 Hammer 8-Ball Specs
106 cu in (1,740 cc) engine produces 97 hp (72 kW) and 113 lb·ft (153 N·m) torque
Fuel capacity: 4.5 US gal (17 L; 3.7 imp gal)
Fuel System: Electronic Fuel Injection with dual 45mm throttle body
Primary Drive: Gear drive with torque compensator
Transmission: six-speed constant mesh
Final Drive: Carbon Fiber Reinforced Belt

=== Vegas Jackpot ===
Debuting in 2006, the Jackpot is, in Victory's own words, an "extreme custom." It features the 100 cu in (1,600 cc) Freedom V-Twin engine and 6-speed transmission (later bikes feature the 106 cu in), a 250 mm rear tire, a color-matched frame and extensive custom styling with bold paint schemes. It is designed to be Victory's top-of-the-line custom.

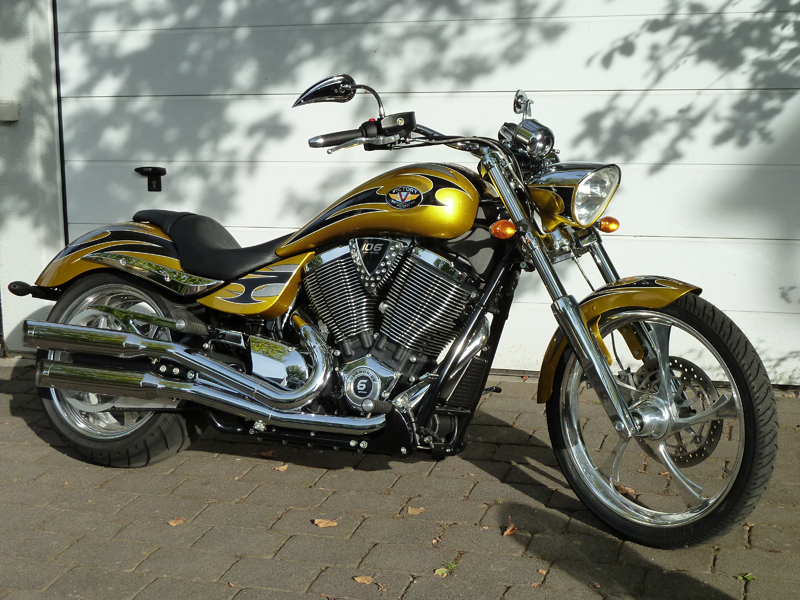
Victory Jackpot (2010)

The Vegas Jackpot is considered part of Victory's Muscle Cruisers.

2010 Vegas Jackpot Specs
106 cu in (1,740 cc) engine produces 97 hp (72 kW) and 113 lb⋅ft (153 N⋅m) torque
Engine: four-stroke 50° V-Twin
Fuel capacity: 4.5 US gal (17 L; 3.7 imp gal)
Fuel System: Electronic Fuel Injection with dual 45mm throttle body
Primary Drive: Gear drive with torque compensator
Transmission: six-speed constant mesh
Final Drive: Carbon Fiber Reinforced Belt

=== Ness Signature Series ===
Motorcycle customizer Arlen Ness and his son Cory Ness teamed with Victory in 2003 to create a limited-edition model based on the Vegas. The bikes they developed used many Ness aftermarket billet aluminum accessories, custom paint schemes and their signatures on the side panels. In 2005, they added the Kingpin to the lineup. In 2006, the Jackpot was the basis for the Ness Signature Series. It featured many chrome accessories, a custom seat built by Danny Gray, custom billet aluminum wheels, and the signatures of Arlen and Cory Ness on the side panels. For 2007, the Ness Signature Series is based on the Jackpot. The styling featured swept back cowls with matching cargo covers with a flame or fluorescent paint scheme, that left old, stodgy cruiser riders aghast, riding with the "cruiser face" usually found on Harley riders.

In 2010 Arlen Ness and Cory Ness created two more limited-edition Victorys; The Arlen Ness Vision and the Cory Ness Jackpot. Created as limited editions the bikes have custom paint & wheels, Ness chrome, diamond-cut engine heads, and are numbered and signed. Aside from the custom work the two bikes have the same specs as their non-limited edition cousins.

=== Vision Street and Vision Tour ===
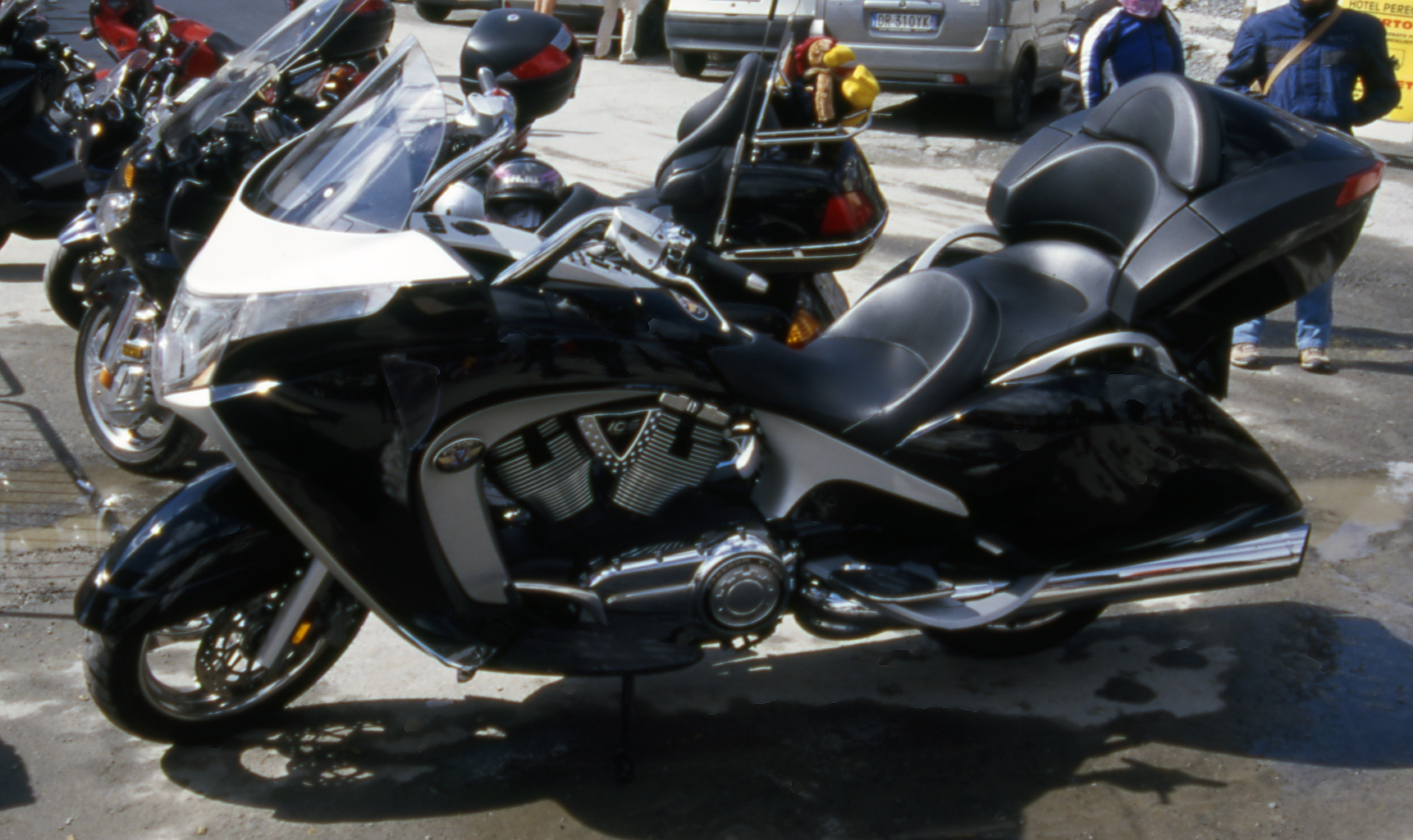
Victory Vision Tour

Introduced in February 2007 as an addition to the 2008 lineup, the Vision is a touring configuration. It comes in two versions, the Street, which includes a full fairing and hard saddlebags; and the Tour, which also has a hard trunk. The Vision offers a low seat height and a wide range of luxury electronics. In 2010 Victory changed the Street version to an 8-Ball.

2010 Vision Specs
106 cu in (1,740 cc) engine produces 92 hp (69 kW) and 109 lb⋅ft (148 N⋅m) torque
Engine: four-stroke 50° V-Twin
Fuel capacity: 6 US gal (23 L; 5.0 imp gal)
Fuel System: Electronic Fuel Injection with dual 45mm throttle body
Primary Drive: Gear drive with torque compensator
Transmission: six-speed constant mesh
Final Drive: Carbon Fiber Reinforced Belt

=== Vision 8-Ball ===
The Kingpin 8-Ball is considered part of Victory's 8-Ball Cruisers.

2010 Vision 8-Ball Specs
106 cu in (1,740 cc) engine produces 92 hp (69 kW) and 109 lb⋅ft (148 N⋅m) torque
Engine: four-stroke 50° V-Twin
Fuel capacity: 6 US gal (23 L; 5.0 imp gal)
Fuel System: Electronic Fuel Injection with dual 45 mm throttle body
Primary Drive: Gear drive with torque compensator
Transmission: six-speed constant mesh
Final Drive: Carbon Fiber Reinforced Belt

=== Cross Country ===
New for 2010, the Victory Cross Country Motorcycle is a hard-bagger cruiser with a handlebar mounted fairing. It has a Freedom V-Twin Engine, 21 gallons of cargo capacity, 4.7 inches of suspension travel, floorboards, cruise control and an MP3-compatible sound system.

Specs
106 cu in (1,740 cc) engine produces 92 hp (69 kW) and 109 lb⋅ft (148 N⋅m) torque
Engine: four-stroke 50° V-Twin
Fuel capacity: 5.8 US gal (22 L; 4.8 imp gal)
Fuel System: Electronic Fuel Injection with dual 45 mm throttle body
Primary Drive: Gear drive with torque compensator
Transmission: six-speed constant mesh
Final Drive: Carbon Fiber Reinforced Belt

=== Cross Roads ===
The Victory Cross Roads motorcycle, also new for 2010, shares the most horsepower and cargo capacity in its class with the Cross Country. Its 106-cubic-inch Freedom V-Twin Engine and 21 gallons of cargo capacity, cruiser styling, comfortable seating, a wind-blocking windshield - were designed to give the rider "an appetite for the open road."

Specs
106 cu in (1,740 cc) engine produces 92 hp (69 kW) and 109 lb⋅ft (148 N⋅m) torque
Engine: four-stroke 50° V-Twin
Fuel capacity: 5.8 US gal (22 L; 4.8 imp gal)
Fuel System: Electronic Fuel Injection with dual 45mm throttle body
Primary Drive: Gear drive with torque compensator
Transmission: six-speed constant mesh
Final Drive: Carbon Fiber Reinforced Belt

=== Judge ===
New for 2013, the Victory Judge Motorcycle is sport cruiser with a 106-cubic-inch Freedom V-Twin Engine, muscle car inspired styling and mid mounted controls.

Specs
106 cu in (1,740 cc) engine produces 110 lb⋅ft (150 N⋅m) torque
Engine: four-stroke 50° V-Twin how many mfc. in 2015

Fuel capacity: 5 US gal (19 L; 4.2 imp gal)
Fuel System: Electronic Fuel Injection with dual 45mm throttle body
Primary Drive: Gear drive with torque compensator
Transmission: six-speed overdrive constant mesh
Final Drive: Carbon Fiber Reinforced Belt

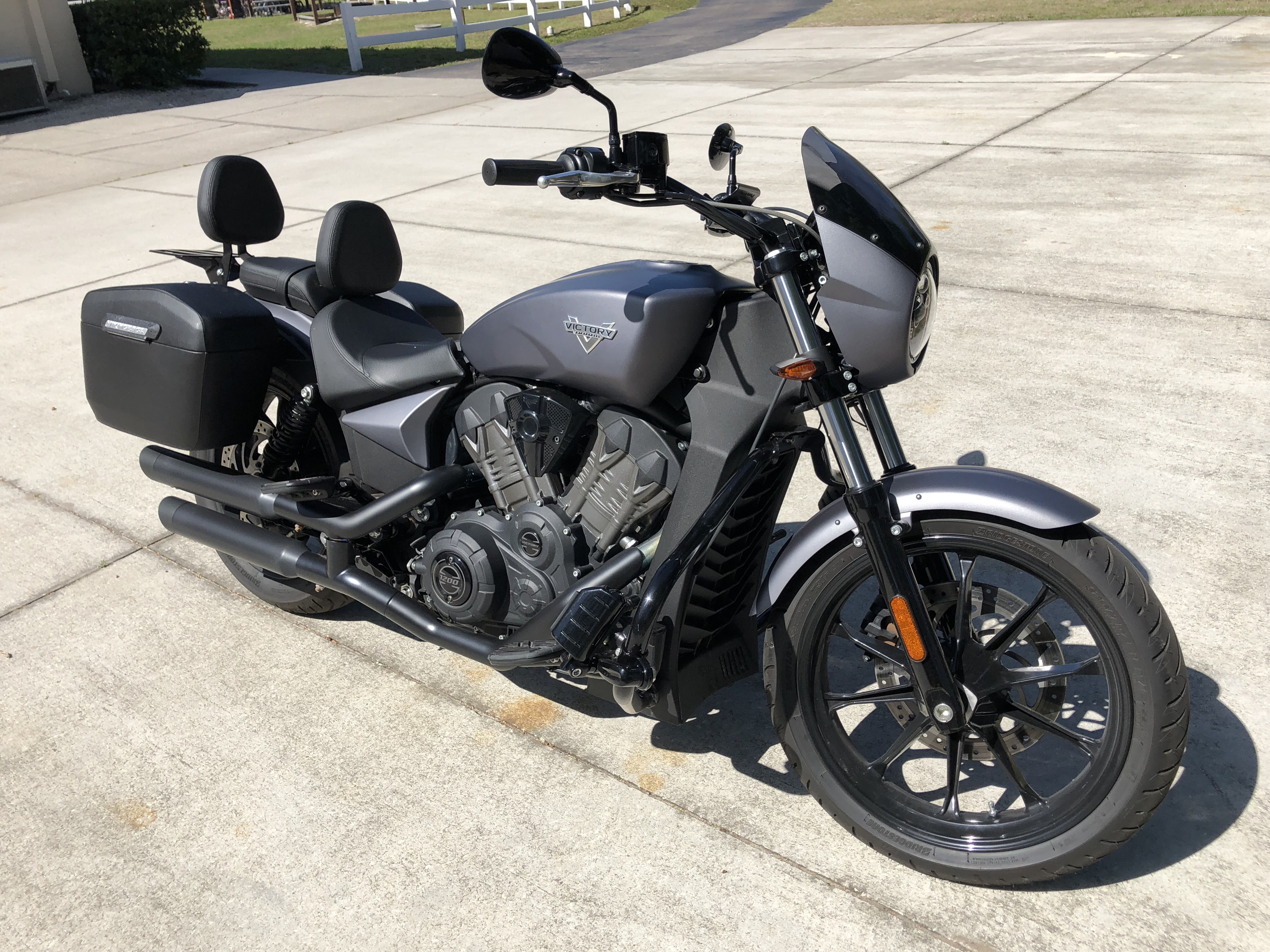

=== Octane ===
New for the 2017 model year.

The Octane is a completely new Victory design that was said to be inspired from Project 156 Pikes Peak racer. The Octane also shares 35% of its parts with the Indian Scout. Featuring a 1,179 cc (71.9 cu in) liquid cooled V-twin engine with 104 hp (78 kW)@ 8,000 rpm and 79 lb⋅ft (107 N⋅m) @ 6,000 rpm with a claimed dry weight of 548 lb (249 kg) and a tested 1/4-mile time of 12.0 seconds at 109 mph (175 km/h). They were only made with a single seat and also can be customized with the two-in-one exhaust to provide additional power for the bike. Spare parts for this bike are available for the next 10 years as per advised by local dealers and Polaris. Approximately 4000 Octane bikes were produced and shipped worldwide.

== 8-Ball versions ==
There are five bikes that come in 8-Ball versions: Hammer, Vegas, Kingpin, Vision, and Cross Country. 8-Balls come in one color and have a lower retail price tag. The bikes are basically the same as their counterparts but generally come with fewer add-ons. Example: The Vision 8-Ball does not come with the passenger backrest/trunk. The 8-Ball versions of the bikes are also lower or have a lower seat.

== Marketing contest ==
In 2010 Victory marketing manager Josh Kurcinka announced a contest in which ten people won a lease on one of the two new Victory touring bikes: Cross Country or Cross Roads. The entrants had submitted a 90-second video explaining why they deserved a lease on a new bike and what they had planned for the summer. Contestants were asked to outline four different and do-able road trips. Victory judged the entries based on plausibility of trips, content and originality. Submissions were taken online and at Industry Trade Shows like the New York International Motorcycle Show. Beginning in May 2010, winning riders began taking a series of road trips each month through August 2010 from two to five days each. Riders documented their experiences through blogs, videos and photos sharing both their reviews of the bikes and the sites they visit along the way.

== Owners clubs ==
The Victory Motorcycle Club is an independent, not-for-profit group of Victory motorcycle owners and enthusiasts that began in 1998 as a Yahoo online chat site by several owners of Victory Motorcycles. The club has grown from a small group of enthusiasts to an international club with more than 2,700 paid members and 11,000 guests in the United States, Canada, Great Britain and Germany. As of July 2010 there are 107 local chapters.

== Winding down ==
On 9 January 2017, parent company Polaris Industries issued a press release announcing that they would immediately begin winding down operations of Victory Motorcycles due to struggles in establishing market share and limited profitability. The brand itself would also be discontinued. Dealers were to liquidate inventories, while spare parts would be made available for ten years. Dealers were to continue offering service and warranty coverage to owners.

With Victory, Polaris objectively created high quality, American-made cruisers, baggers and touring bikes. However, subjectively, Victory could not capture the legacy and emotion Harley-Davidson enjoys from its owners. Polaris solved this problem by purchasing and reviving the Indian Motorcycle brand in 2011. Once it became clear that Indian could better compete with Harley-Davidson on an emotional level, Polaris decided its production capacity and resources would be better devoted to its Indian brand.
