= The Photo Atlas =

American dance-punk band

- Origin: Denver, Colorado
- Genres: Indie rock, dance-punk
- Years active: 2004–2015, 2023–present
- Labels: Morning After, Stolen Transmission
- Past members: Devon Shirley; Nick Miles; Bill Threlkeld III; Mark Hawkins

The Photo Atlas are a dance-punk quartet originating from Denver, Colorado. The band consists of Alan Andrews Jr on vocals and guitar, Chris Martinez on guitar, & Kevin Laxar on bass.

In early 2013, the ensemble released the full-length studio album Stuck In A Honeytrap.

In 2006, the ensemble released the EP Handshake Heartattack, and in 2007, the band released their first studio album No, Not Me, Never. In 2009, they released an EP To Silently Provoke the Ghost.

On March 8, 2007, the band was named Spin.com's Artist of the Day. The band has played on-stage alongside acts such as Alkaline Trio, Oh No Not Stereo, The Bronx, The Appleseed Cast, The Thermals, Scary Kids Scaring Kids, Local H, As Cities Burn, Paulson, The Forecast, In The Whale, Little Brazil, The Enemy UK, 1090 Club, 3OH!3, The Swellers, The Chain Gang of 1974, Portugal The Man, The Axe That Chopped The Cherry Tree, The Bravery, Motion City Soundtrack, These Arms Are Snakes, and Unwritten Law

Their song "Red Orange Yellow" is featured in the video games Burnout Paradise, Burnout Dominator, and MLB 07: The Show. "Handshake Heart Attack" is featured in Tony Hawk's Downhill Jam.

== Highlights ==
- (2013) Alternative Press 4 Star Review
- (2012) Performance at SXSW
- (2011) Performances at CMJ, SXSW
- (2010) Performances at CMJ, SXSW
- (2009) Alternative Press- 4 Star review + feature
- (2009) Performance at ESPN X Games X Fest, Aspen, CO
- (2008) Performance at Mile High Music Festival w/ Dave Matthews, Tom Petty, etc.,
- (2008) Performance at Monolith Festival w/ Silversun Pickups, Vampire Weekend, Tokyo Police Club, etc.
- (2008) Featured on EA’s Burnout Paradise soundtrack
- (2008) Taco Bell Chosen as 100 ‘Feed The Beat’ bands
- (2008) Performances at CMJ, SXSW, and Warped Tour
- (2007) Featured as one of Alternative Press’ “22 Best Underground Bands That Won’t Stay Underground For Long”
- (2007) Performance at AST Dew Tour for NBC, Denver, CO
- (2007) SPIN.com Band of the Day
- (2007) Performance at Purevolume Winter X Games
- (2007) Featured on SXSW Showcase “Best 100 Bands to Watch” compilation
- (2007) Performances at CMJ, SXSW, Warped Tour
- (2006) Featured artist for Airwalk snowboarding brand boots with ads placed in all major skate and snowboard magazines
- (2006) Performance at ESPN X Games X Fest, Los Angeles, CA

== Discography ==
=== Albums ===
- No, Not Me, Never (2007), Stolen Transmission
- Stuck In A Honeytrap (2013) Inca House Collective

=== EPs ===
- Handshake Heartattack EP 2006, Morning After Records
- To Silently Provoke the Ghost April 21, 2009, INgrooves
- The Friendship EP Oct 30, 2009, ℗ 2010 The Epilogues
- No Regrets/Transmission Crash, The Blasting Room, 2014
- Get Your Own Vices Sep 20, 2024, The Photo Atlas
- Hello Hospital Sep 19, 2025, The Photo Atlas

== Interviews ==
- Interview w/ PlayBackPress - March 2007
- The Photo Atlas' Interview w/ The Scenestar - June 2007
