= Motorcycle design =

Process to design all aspects of motorcycles

Motorcycle design can be described as activities that define the appearance, function and engineering of motorcycles.

Professionally it is a branch of industrial design, similar to automotive design using identical techniques and methodology, but confined by conventions about what is acceptable to the buying public. These conventions have been defined by the acceptance of the industry and media as a whole to the assumption that the public will only purchase machines that bear more than a passing resemblance to competition machines of whatever kind. In some large OEM motorcycle manufacturers, the term designer can also be applied to the project leader or chief engineer charged with laying down the principal architecture of the vehicle. In recent years, it has also become associated with custom or "chopper" builder culture.

== Professional design ==
Professional motorcycle designers almost always hold degrees in industrial design, industrial design engineering or similar, and have training in styling, modeling, as well as knowledge in aspects of technology associated with single track vehicles. Although no degree as a specialisation exists per se, the majority of candidates graduate through colleges and universities with established transportation design courses, and are trained as automotive designers.

Most OEM motorcycle manufacturers, such as Honda, Suzuki, Kawasaki, BMW, Ducati, Piaggio and others have in-house design studios dedicated to this purpose, while others such as Yamaha and KTM depend on specialised independent motorcycle design studios.

== Methodology ==
=== Design and engineering relationships ===
Due to the high importance of mechanical components or even exposed engines to motorcycle styling, almost always designers will have a greater sensitivity to and awareness of engineering than will typical car designers. In OEM situations, large teams of professional engineers and specialists will collaborate on each project development, allowing the designer to focus on the more intangible or subjective aspects of design, such as styling, human-machine interface psychology, and market and cultural relationships. In other matters such as pure mechanical ergonomics (such as seat height, handlebar placement, etc.), or basic layout (the location of major components, storage, etc.) there is usually considerable overlap between the designer and engineer. The designer will nominally approach each problem from a human interface, or "feel" or "irrational" point of view (example : "Does this material feel cold or warm, and is this feeling appropriate to this vehicle's target consumer?"), while the engineer will attack each problem with the "rational" or clinical approach of empirically weighing the cause and effect of each design decision against the project's technical and economic design targets (example : "Can this material be moulded into the designer's desired shape? Will that be too expensive to produce?")

=== Research and concept design ===
In OEM motorcycle design, the normal procedure of developing a new motorcycle involves the same steps as in other professional design disciplines : identifying a target consumer, researching them to identify benchmarks and project targets, then proposing concept directions in a written form known as a Design Brief or QFD. From this point, artwork is developed to visually communicate the designer's ideas. These are presented in 2D drawing or illustrated form, from which a winning direction is down selected for further development. Once a satisfactory design is established on paper (the term paper is a generalization that can include traditional hand renderings, digital artwork or CAD drawings), then full scale modeling begins to realise the design in tangible 3D form.

=== Styling ===
Often used as an interchangeable term with "design", styling is in fact just one component of the design process. Typically, styling is developed through sketches, renderings and illustrations then realised in 3D form using automotive styling clay, specialised industrial modeling foams such as Sibatool, Renshape or Epiwood, or in increasingly limited cases plaster or body filler. As the most subjective part of the design process, the various members of the development team must depend heavily on the judgment, skill and experience of the appointed designer to create an appropriate look.

The most misunderstood element and the most dangerous to the success of a product, is the idea that team members should evaluate the design based on personal tastes or preferences. Industrial design is not an art form, but a focused creative expression using the scientific data and analysis in the Design Brief and QFD as ultimate guidelines. The target user, their needs and tastes should be reflected in the final design, not necessarily exclusively those of the design team. Of course, many complex variables such as the OEM brand identity, past successes and failures, and whimsical trends often skew or distort styling decisions. In instances where the factors are overwhelming, OEM's may err on the side of cautious conservative design.

=== Parallel development ===
Because of the need to reduce development time and costs, the "styling" design model is usually developed in parallel with the engineering 3D design. While there is an increasing amount of digital design input in the modern OEM design process, nearly all major motorcycle manufacturers still rely on full scale clay models to render the master style model, then scan and import the styling surfaces into suitable 3D software packages (Alias, CATIA, ISEM Surf) for integration into the 3D engineering CAD platform (CATIA, ProEngineer, etc.). Once combined, the design team can virtually refine the motorcycle by optimising component assembly, checking for any undesirable interferences between parts, and predict and eliminate possible engineering problems. Typically, designers and engineers will have the greatest number of conflicts during this phase of development, as designers will fight to maintain the original styling and design of the clay model and artwork into the production vehicle, while the engineer will eliminate all problems in the most efficient manner possible. The success of the final product depends heavily on the level of cooperation between these often conflicting needs.

== Amateur and specialists ==
=== Custom builders ===
In recent years, largely due to the popularity of television programs like Orange County Chopper and Biker Build-off, the building of one of a kind "chopper" or "cruiser" type motorcycles has become more mainstream, leading to a flourishing builder industry. As a whole, these vehicles are not designed in the professional sense, but rather crafted by hand by metal workers and artisans using traditional skills. The resulting vehicles tend to be very elaborate, expensive and difficult or impossible to reproduce in mass production, but are highly valued for the same reasons.

Among custom motorcycle culture, certain names have become famous for their creations and have led to mainstream acceptance of previously unacceptable design solutions such as extreme ergonomics, totally rigid rear wheels without the benefit of suspension, minimal lighting and limited ground clearance for cornering. These design characteristics are purely emotional in nature, being led by styling and image rather than technical or performance considerations.

=== "Specials" ===
Custom and specials motorcycles are similar to the above but tend to be super sport type motorcycles, or at least high-performance based, using many special add-on parts, one-of-a-kind or limited series frames, racing wheels and parts or hand-made components to maximise performance. While modifying motorcycles is an activity as old as the motorcycle itself, the "special" culture or "streetfighter" began to flourish in the mid-1970s as a response to the myriad high performance Japanese motorcycles then available, but whose power far exceeded their handling. Individuals would choose premanufactured parts from catalogs or from other bikes and redesign their particular machine to suit their desires. In general this activity is limited to one-of-a-kind vehicles and, as with custom motorcycles, uses very little genuine engineering or design methodology, although some small-scale manufacturers exist who make limited runs of a given model. In some cases, these tiny specialists were successful enough to grow into full-scale OEM companies such as the Buell Motorcycle Company and Bimota of Italy.
