= Lossa Engineering =

Motorcycle manufacturer in California

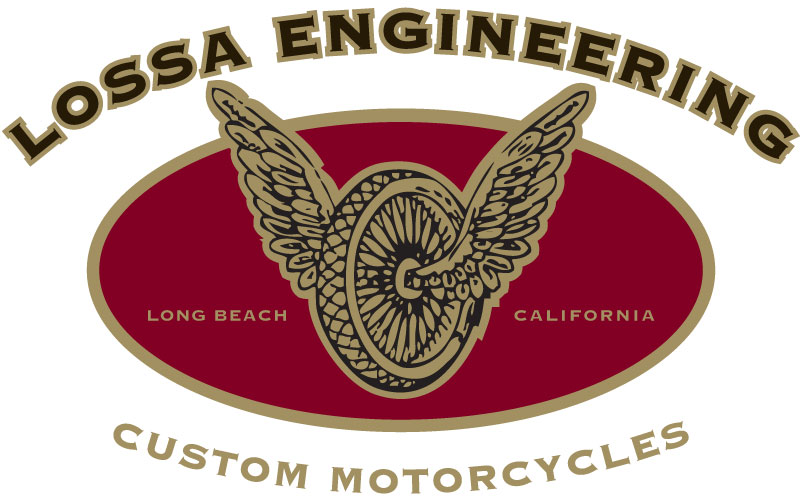
- Industry: Custom motorcycles
- Founded: Long Beach, California, 2007
- Headquarters: Long Beach, California, U.S.
- Owner: Jay LaRossa
- Website: www.lossaengineering.com

Lossa Engineering is a custom motorcycle manufacturer based in Long Beach, California.

Lossa Engineering creates made-to-order motorcycles and does restoration and customization of vintage motorcycles. In-house work includes custom fabrication, motor work, paint, and upholstery. Buyers include Jason Lee.

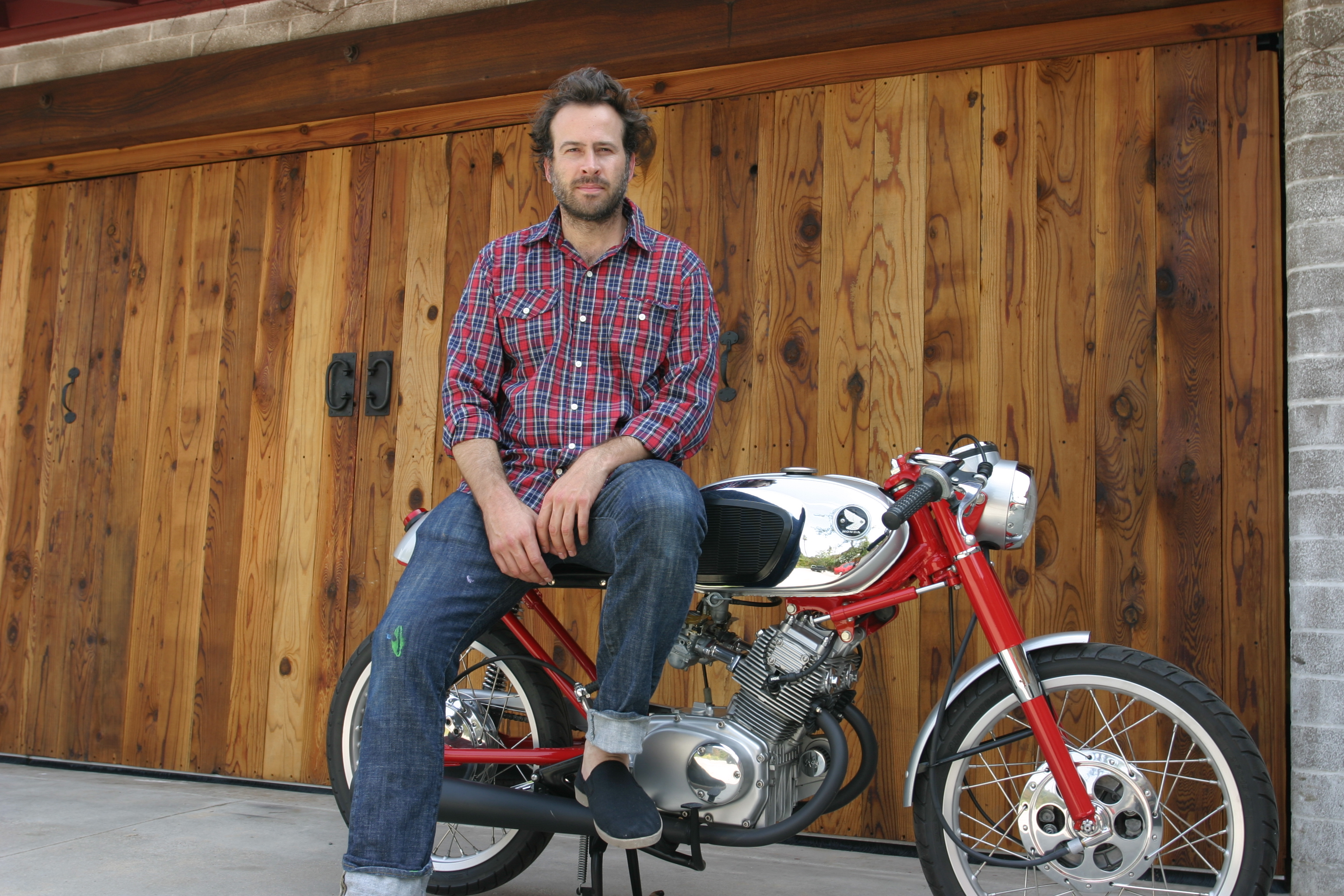
Jason Lee sitting on his Lossa-built Honda CB160

== Jay LaRossa ==
The owner of Lossa Engineering, Jay LaRossa was born in San Fernando Valley, California, on September 9, 1970. Both sides of his family owned motorcycle dealerships in Southern California. LaRossa grew up customizing cars and anything with wheels. He opened his first business customizing cars and trucks in 1998 and gained recognition with vehicles appearing in magazines from US to Japan. Jay's shop built several high end vehicles for aftermarket companies to be displayed at the yearly SEMA Show. Around 2007 Jay started to focus on motorcycles. Due to the love of Café Racers, he decided to build his first one from scratch.

He has appeared on the first aired episode of Monster Garage, "White Trash", and then worked for Jesse James at West Coast Choppers before starting his second business venture, Lossa Engineering. Jay and his shop Lossa Engineering will also be featured in an upcoming TV series (airing October 1, 2010) focused solely on Café Racers and the lifestyle.

== Media ==
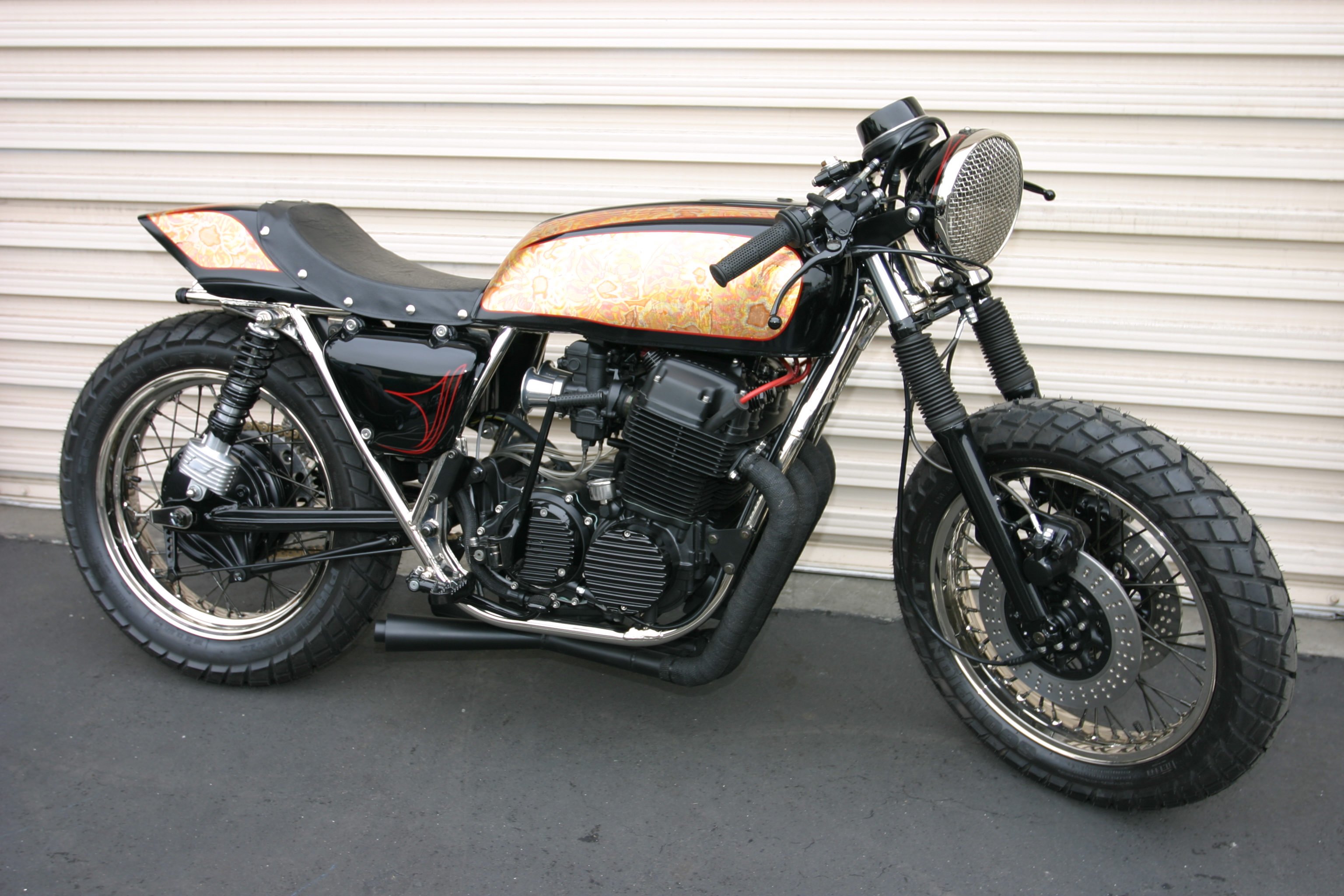
1970s style Honda CB750 built by Lossa Engineering

Lossa Engineering's motorcycles have been featured in several magazines such as Café Racer and Iron Horse in the US, and Cafe Racer Magazine in the UK. Their bike won a 1st place award at the Grand National Roadster Show in Pomona, California. Several bikes have also been featured at the Long Beach International Motorcycle Show.
