= Custom motorcycle =

Motorcycle with changes to its model

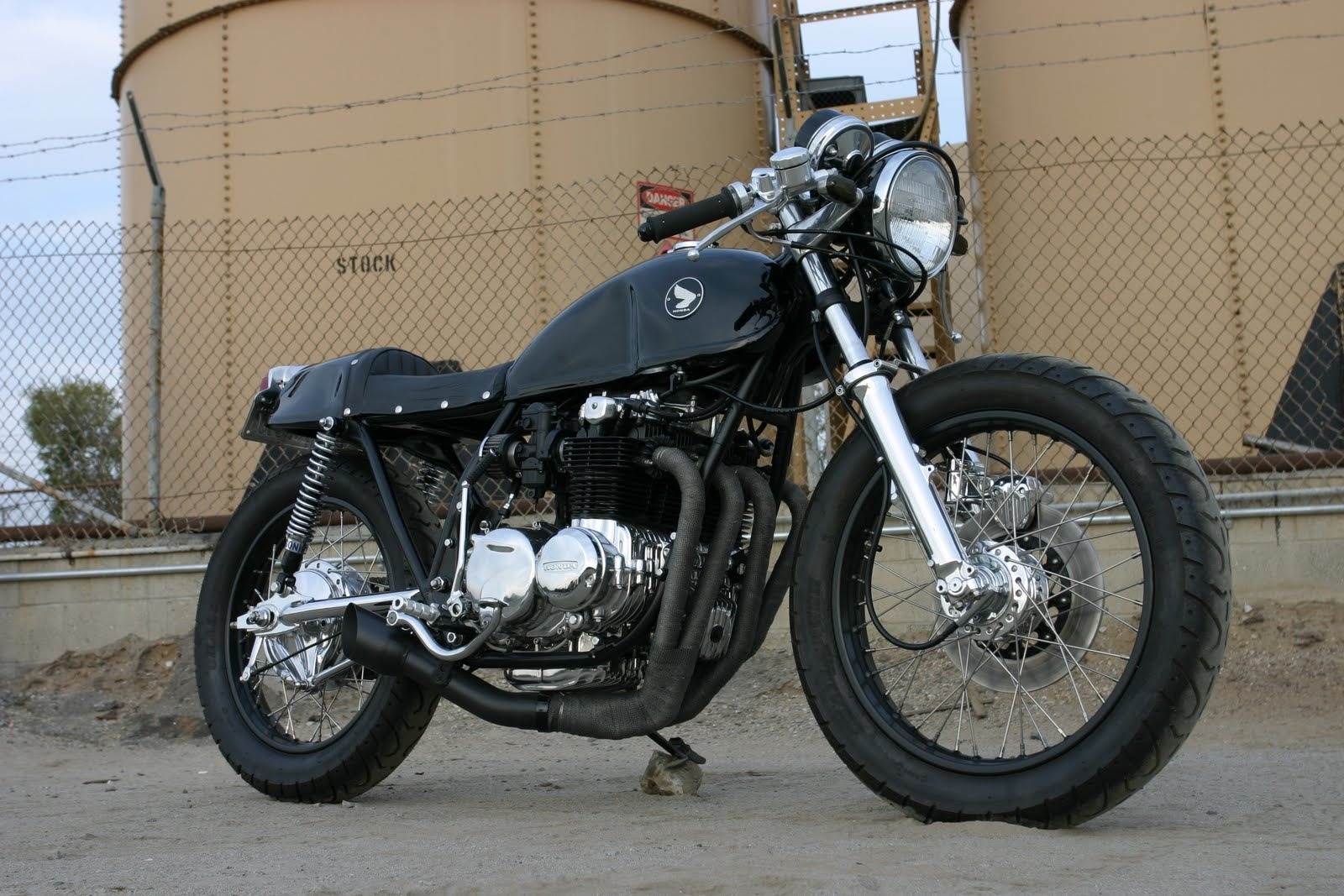
1977 Honda CB550 built by Lossa Engineering

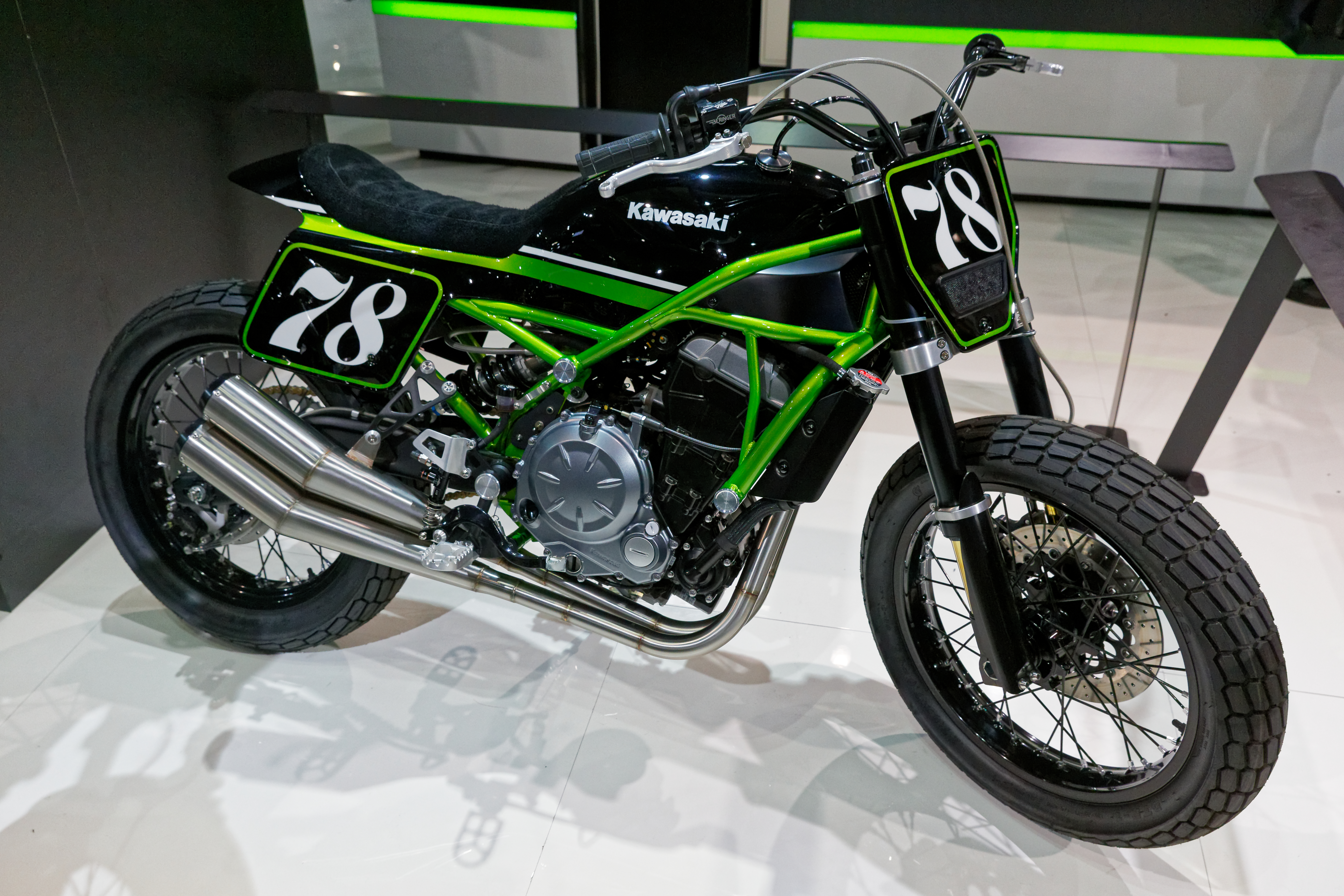
A Kawasaki Z650 street tracker motorcycle

A custom motorcycle is a motorcycle with stylistic and/or structural changes to the 'standard' mass-produced machine offered by major manufacturers. Custom motorcycles might be unique, or built in limited quantities. While individual motorcyclists have altered the appearance of their machines since the first days of motorcycling, the first individualized motorcycles specifically labeled 'Custom' appeared in the late 1950s, around the same time as the term was applied to custom cars.

== History ==
In the 1960s, custom artisans like Arlen Ness and Ben Hardy created new styles of custom bikes, the chopper. In the 1990s and early 2000s, expensive customs such as those built by Orange County Choppers, Jesse James's West Coast Choppers, Roger Goldammer became fashionable status symbols. There are also companies that are bringing back pin striping, such as Kenny Howard (also known as Von Dutch) and Dean Jeffries from the 1950s, with a continued effort to keep pin striping alive. The choppers of the 1960s and 1970s fit into this category.

Some motorcycle manufacturers, such as Harley-Davidson and Honda, include the word "custom" as part of a model name. The factory custom segment has become the most visible in the custom industry in recent years. The original factory custom was the 1971 Harley-Davidson Super Glide, designed by Willie G. Davidson, which, imitating the custom scene of the time, combined the fork from a Sportster with the frame and engine of a big twin Electra Glide, thereby founding a style imitated by many other manufactures ever since. Harley-Davidson VRSC has often been completely customised by enthusiasts and independent workshops from bodykits to custom wheels and tire lettering.

Higher volume producers like American IronHorse, Bourget, Big Dog and BMC build custom motorcycles that also must meet basic safety requirements set by the US Department of Transportation. Factory customs allow the buyer to select from a wide range of options, paint styles, engine sizes and accessories while still having the confidence, support, warranty and finance options that typically are associated with major production manufacturers. Factory customs typically do not offer the total individuality of a home built bike or a "one off custom", but they share much of the appeal that comes with a custom bike and many of the benefits of a factory production motorcycle.

In the early 2010s, a new generation of motorcycles called mini bike or scooter (motorcycle) won popularity. In mid -2010, numerous small motorcycles flooded the market, including Vespa and the Honda Grom, which is also known as Honda MSX.

== Types of customization ==
- Aero-sportbikes
- Bobber
- Café racer
- Chopper
- Cutdown
- Drag bike
- Rat bike
- Scrambler
- Streetfighter
- Street tracker
- Supermoto
- Stunt bike
- Thai-style
- Track bike
- Tribsa
- Triton
- Zokusha
- Itansha

== Notable custom bikes ==
- Bigtoe
- Millyard Viper V10

== Gallery ==
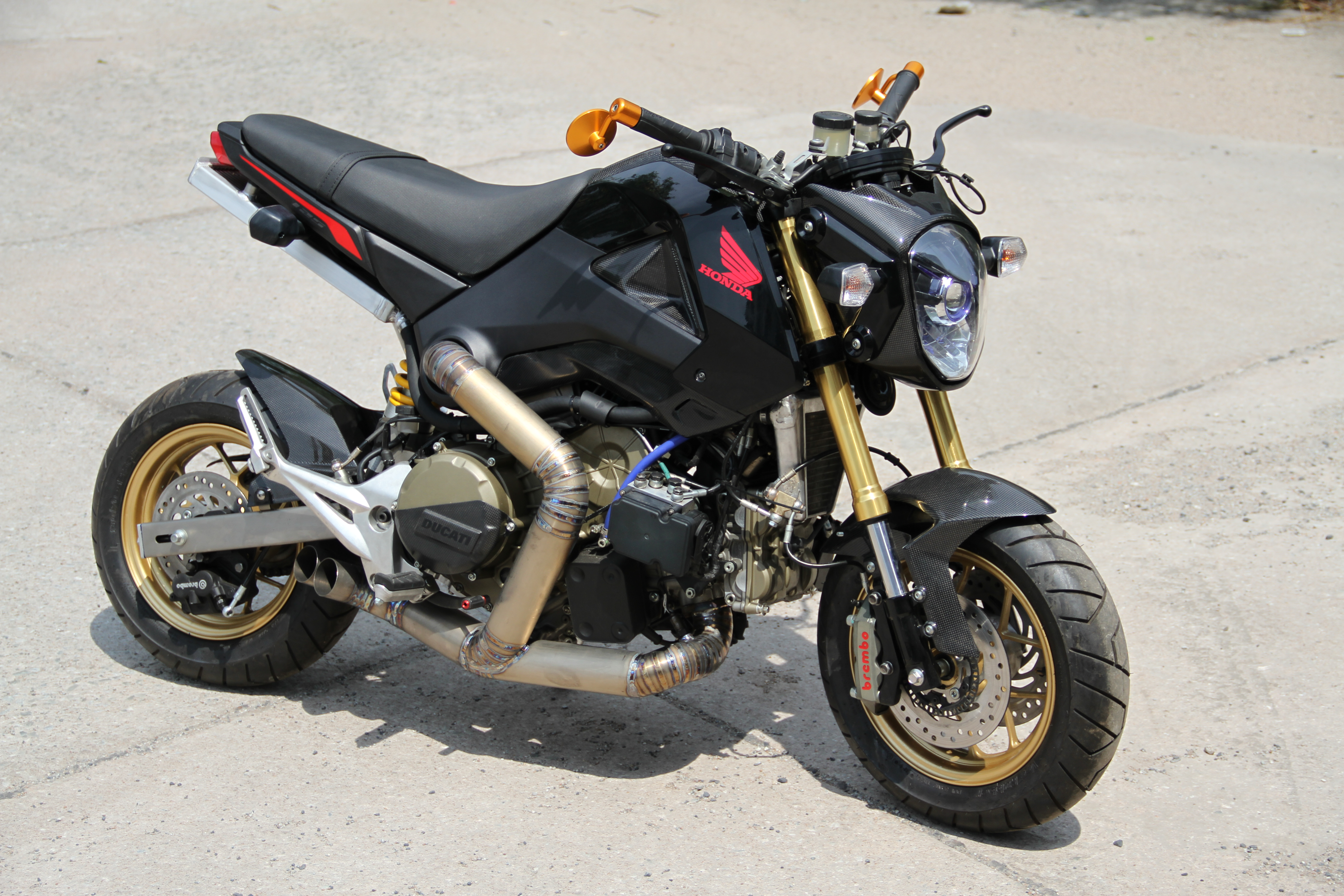
The Mod Dam, a custom mini bike built by Mario Kleff

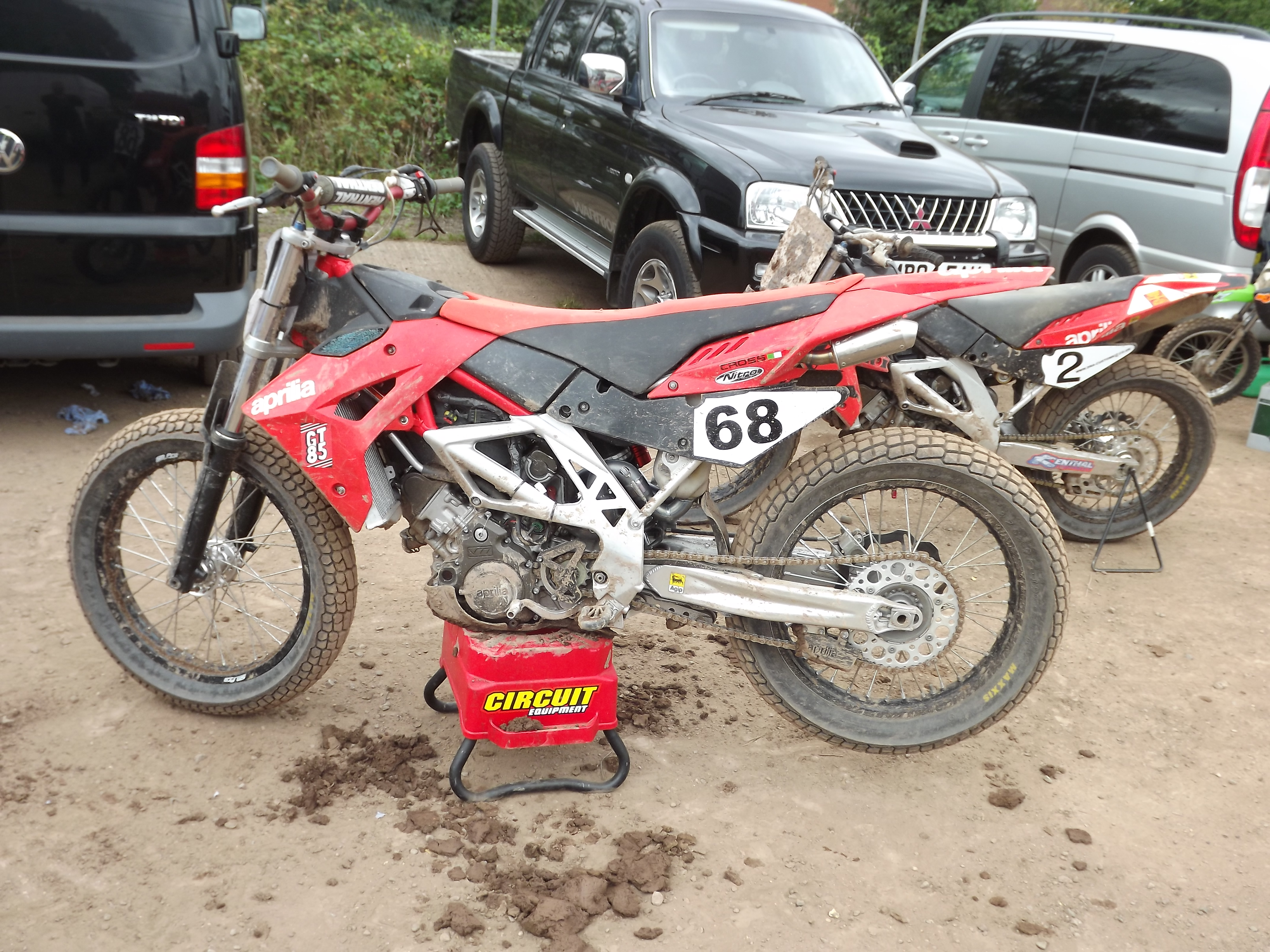
Aprilia RXV modified as a flat track motorcycle

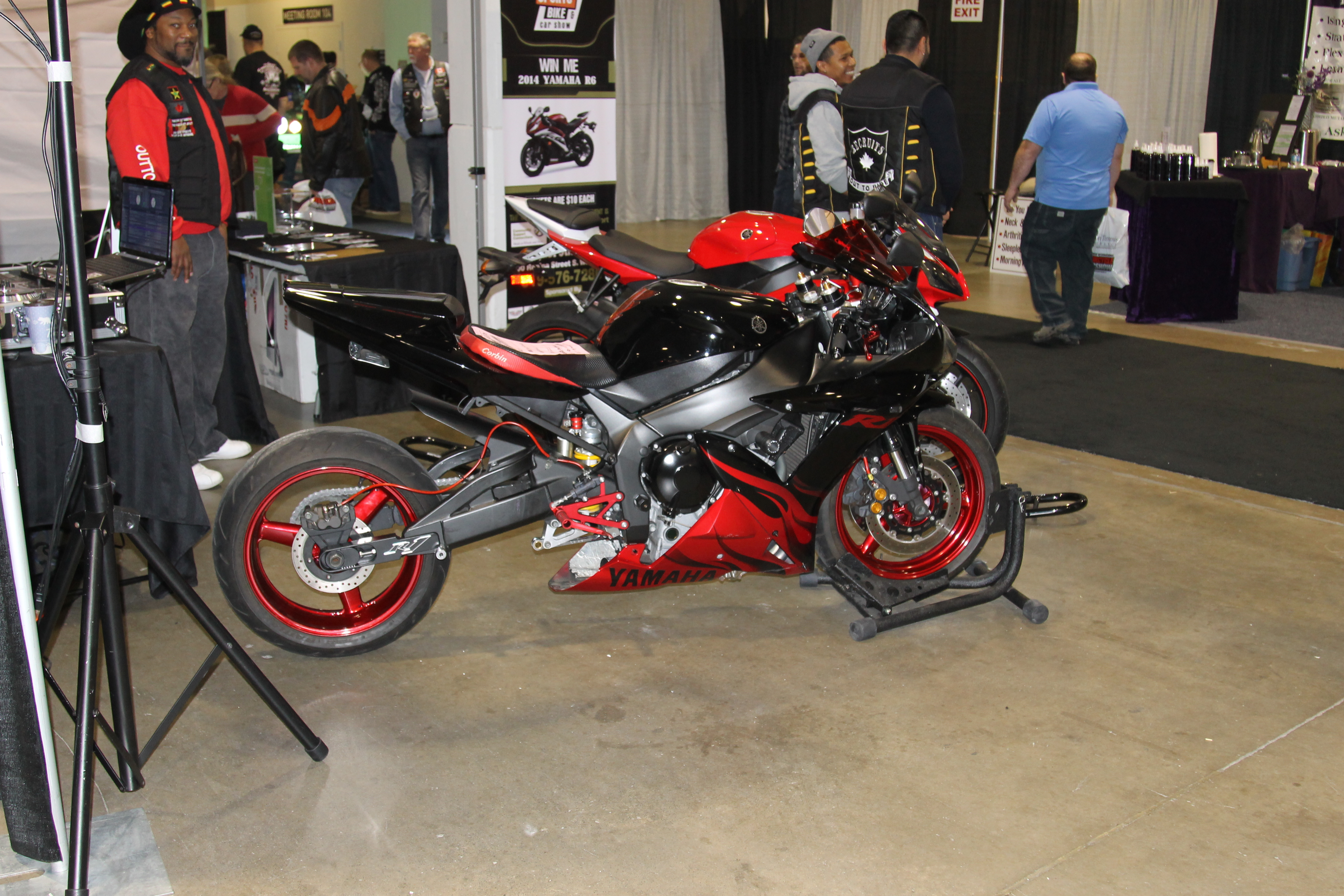
Yamaha R1 drag bike at the NAIMS Motorcycle Show

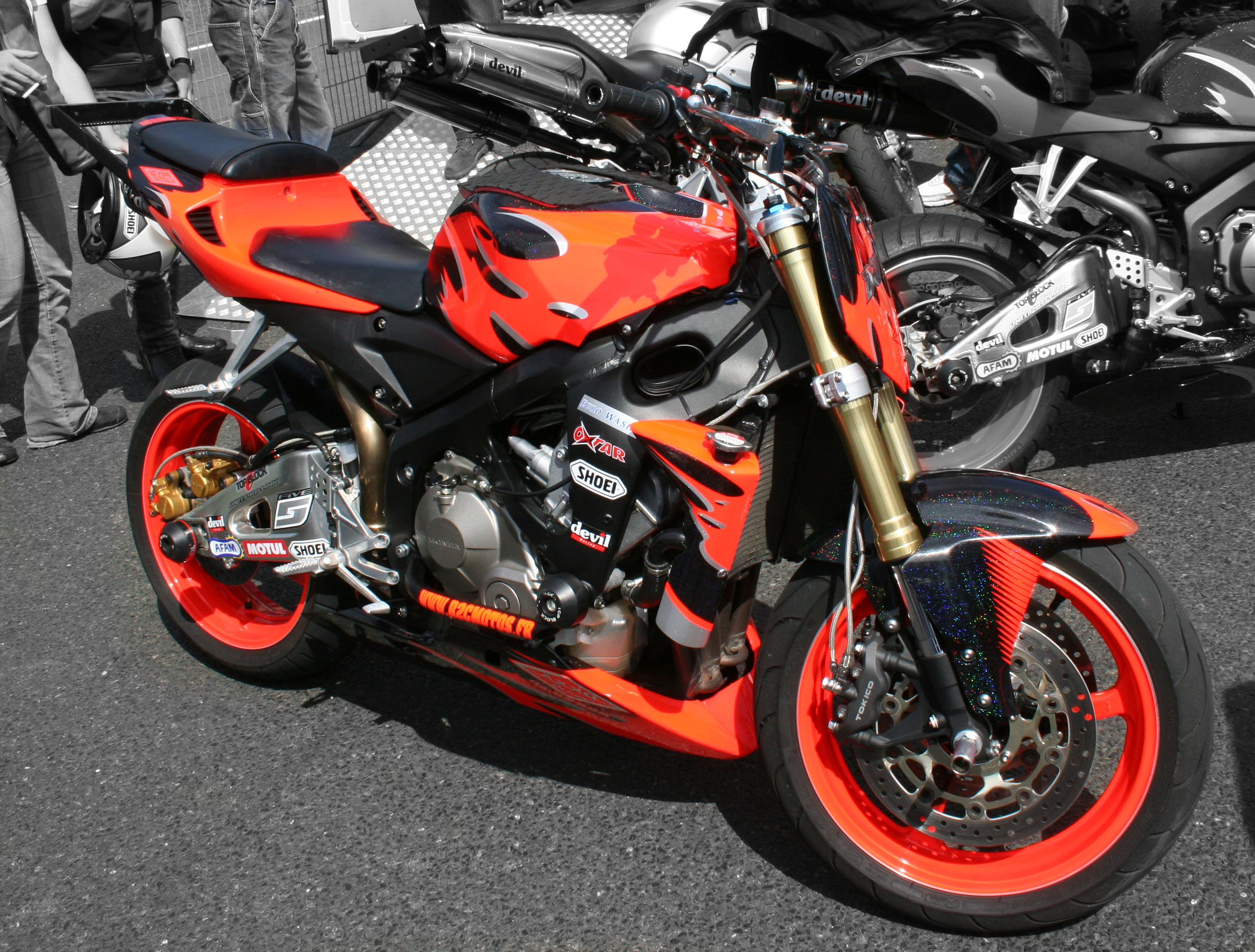
Honda CBR stunt bike

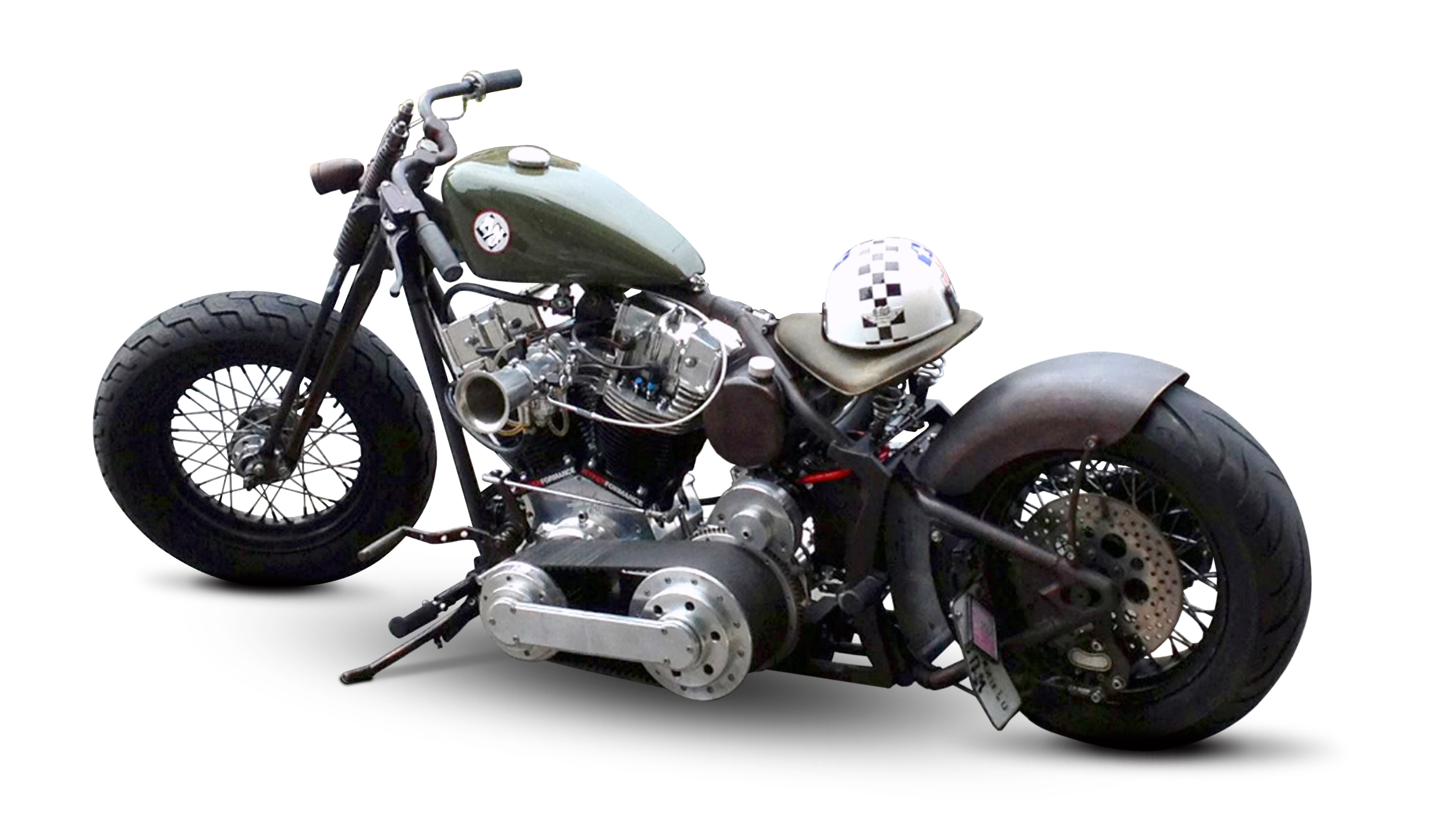
Bobber motorcycle built by Mario Kleff

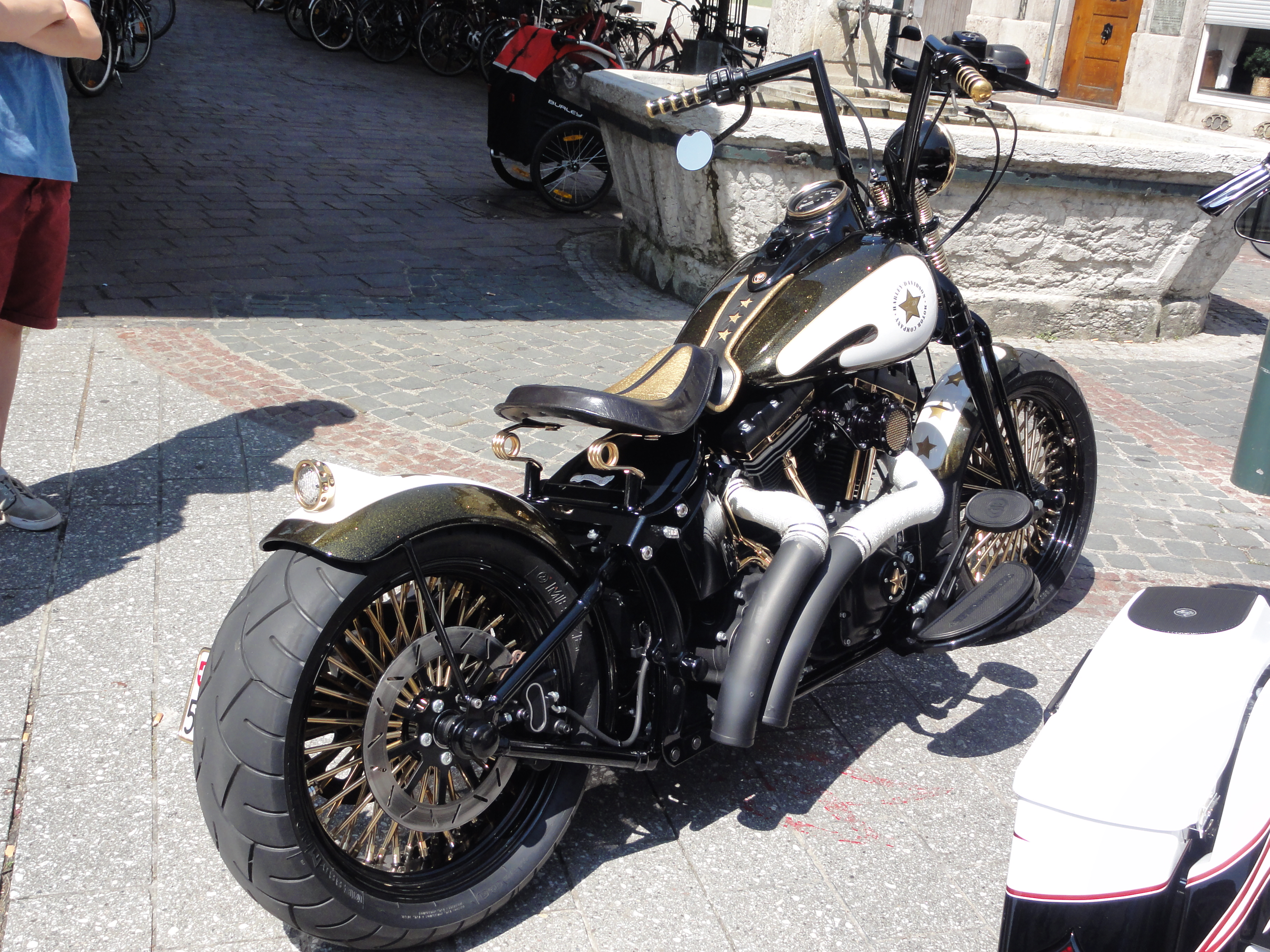
Chopper motorcycle

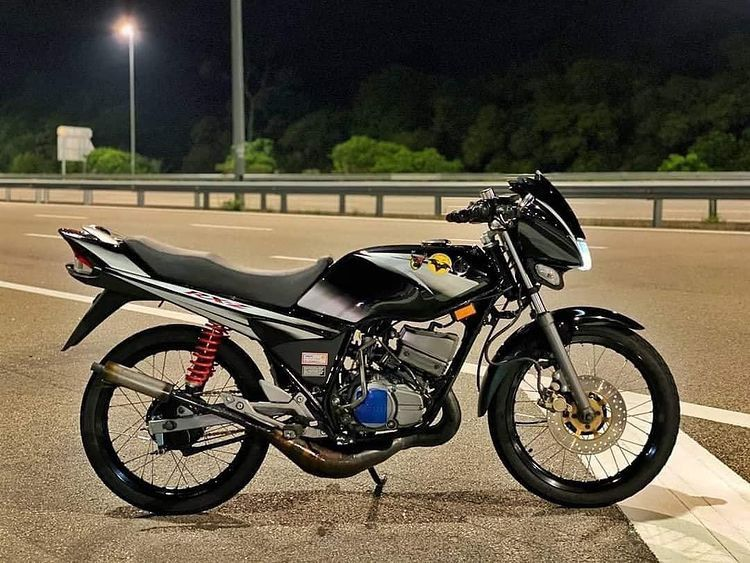
Thai-style Yamaha RX-Z motorcycle

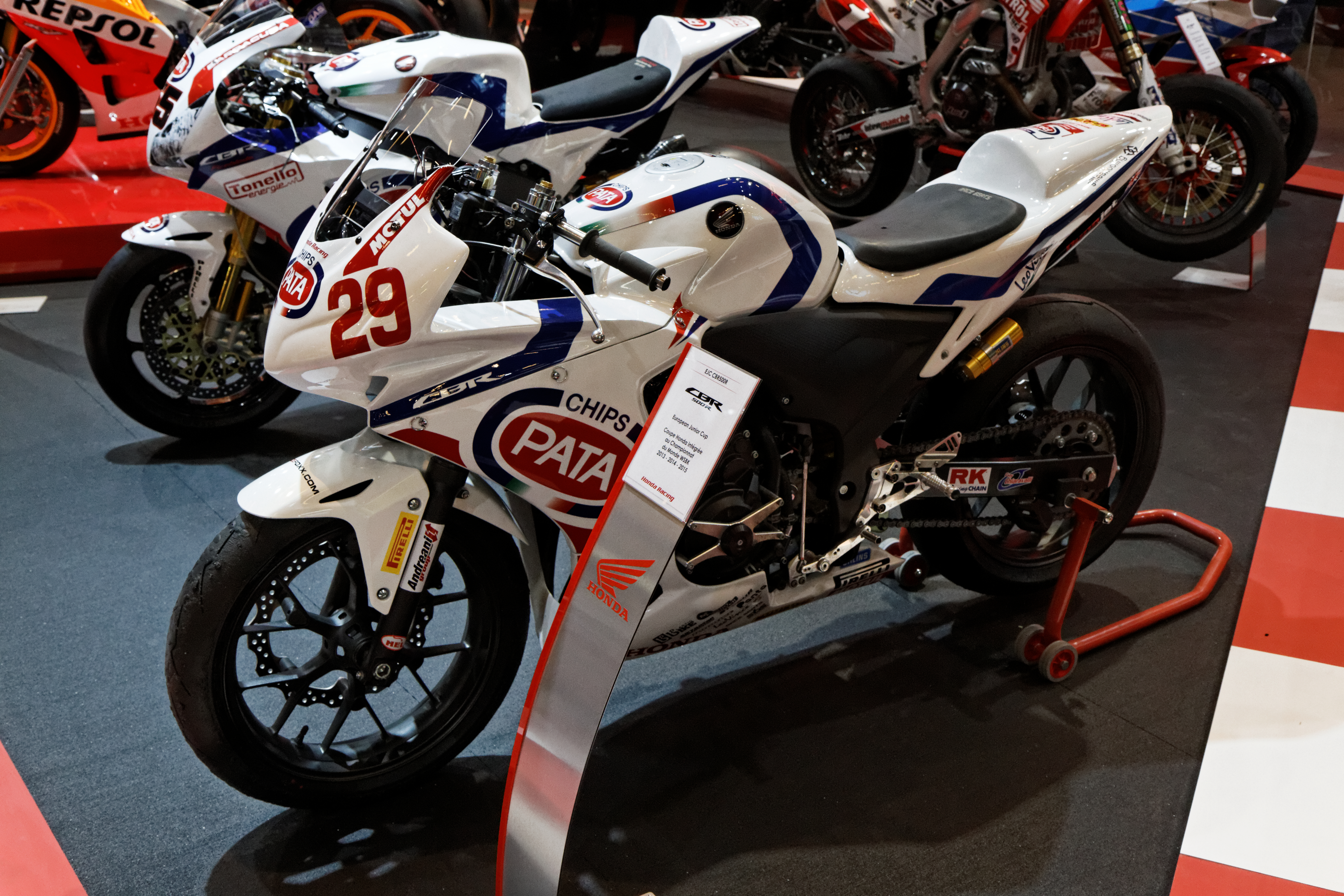
Honda CBR500R track motorcycle

== See also ==
- World championship of bike building
- Outline of motorcycles and motorcycling
