= List of Brands Hatch Circuit fatal accidents =

Fatal accidents to competitors at the Brands Hatch Circuit during national and international motor-sport events.

== List of fatal accidents involving competitors ==
No	Competitor	Date	Place	Series	Race	Type
1	(United Kingdom) George Henry Taylor	Oct 1949				
2	(United Kingdom) Harry Parker	20 Oct 1951			Mechanic's Race	Cooper F3
3	(United Kingdom) Max Klein	10 Oct 1955				Austin Healey
4	(United Kingdom) Ian Dudley	23 May 1956				Cooper
5	(United Kingdom) David S.Dunnage	7 April 1958	Paddock Hill Bend	Formula 3		Cooper – Norton
6	(United Kingdom) Stanley Marks	22 April 1958	Clearways Bend		Sporting Record Trophy	Cooper
7	(United Kingdom) Peter Michell	5 Oct 1958		Formula 3		Cooper – Norton
8	(United Kingdom) Norman Glanville Parker	2 July 1960				Austin Healey Sprite
9	(United Kingdom) Shane L. Summers	1 June 1961	Paddock Hill Bend	Formula 1 Non-Championship	Silver City Trophy	Cooper T53-Climax S4
10	(United Kingdom) Roy Mayhew	13 May 1962		National Road Racing Championship		Matchless
11	(United Kingdom) Harold Scholes	19 Aug 1962				
12	(United Kingdom) Nicholas Russell Fletcher	17 Nov 1962				
13	(United Kingdom) David Downer	12 May 1963	Dingle Dell			Dunstall Norton ‘’Dominator’’ 650cc
14	(United Kingdom) Chris J.Airey	19 May 1963	Bottom Bend	Molyslip Saloon Car Championship		Austin A40
15	(United Kingdom) Thomas Sheaff	22 Sep 1963				
16	(United Kingdom) Doug Brailey	11 Dec 1963	Clearways			Terrier Mk6
17	(Switzerland) Florian Camathias	10 Oct 1965	Clearways			BMW
18	(United Kingdom) George Crossman	27 Dec 1965	Paddock Hill Bend	Formula 3	Lombard Trophy	Cooper T76 – Ford
19	(United Kingdom) Tony Flory	7 May 1966	Paddock Hill Bend		500 Miles of Brands Hatch	Shelby Cobra 289
20	(United Kingdom) Stuart Duncan	3 July 1966	Paddock Hill Bend			Morris Minor
21	(United Kingdom) Robert Smith	24 July 1966	Paddock Hill Bend			
22	(United Kingdom) John Bending	18 Aug 1968	Pilgrims Rise	Amasco Prod Sports Championship	Amasco Prod Sports	MG Midget
23	(United Kingdom) David Lawerence	24 Oct 1968	Clearways			
24	(United Kingdom) Jim Merricks	1 Nov 1970	Paddock Hill Bend	Clubman Race Series		Mini 1000
25	(Switzerland) Jo Siffert	24 Oct 1971	Pilgrims’s Drop	Formula 1 Non-Championship	Victory Race	BRM P160
26	(United Kingdom) Graham Penny	5 Aug 1972	Paddock Hill Bend		Hutchinson 100	
27	(United Kingdom) Gary Walker	19 Sep 1973	Brabham Straight	British 250cc Supercup Championship		
28	(United Kingdom) Mike Gassler	March 1975				
29	(United Kingdom) Lance Capon	20 Sep 1975			Silver Trophy Road Race	Capon-Vincent 1000
30	(United Kingdom) Thomas Standing	12 June 1976	Bottom Bend			Norton
31	(United Kingdom) Michael Giddings	26 Dec 1976	Graham Hill Bend	Formula Ford		Dulon LD4C – Ford
32	(Australia) Brian McGuire	29 Aug 1977	Stirlings	Shellsport International Championship	Shellsport G8 Championship	McGuire BM1 – Ford
33	(United Kingdom) Piers Forester	30 Oct 1977	Clearways	Brands Racing Committee – Formula 750		Yamaha TZ 750A
34	(United Kingdom) Martin Raymond	16 March 1980	Dingle Dell	World Championship of Makes	Brands Hatch 6 Hours	Chevron B36 – Ford Cosworth BDX
35	(United Kingdom) Stephen Langton	6 Oct 1985	Paddock Hill Bend	FIA Formula 1 European Grand Prix	Historics Support Race	Connaught B – Alta
36	(United Kingdom) Mark Edward Salle	20 Oct 1985	Paddock Hill Bend			
37	(United Kingdom) Paul Blanks	17 Sep 1988	Paddock Hill Bend		Championship of Brands Hatch	Yamaha
38	(Netherlands) Gerard Slotboom	22 Oct 1988	Paddock Hill Bend		Yamaha TZR250 World Finals	Yamaha TZR 250cc
39	(United Kingdom) Dave Burford	15 Oct 1989	Clearways			Yamaha 600cc
40	(United Kingdom) Gordon Ellinor	1 Aug 1993				
41	(United Kingdom) Kenton Owen	1 Aug 1993				
42	(United Kingdom) Graeme Ritchie	8 Aug 1997	Hawthorn's Bend	FIM World Superbike Championship	Grand Prix of Europe	Ducati 888
43	(United Kingdom) Gavin Turner	8 June 2002		Powerbike Southern Championship		Kawasaki ZX9R
44	(United Kingdom) Danny Whalin	8 March 2003	Paddock Hill Bend	British Motorcycle Racing Club	BMCRC Yamaha Past Masters	Yamaha TZR 250cc
45	(United Kingdom) Darren Mitchell	20 June 2004	Hawthorns Hill	MCRCB National Superstock Championship	MCRCB Superstock Championship Race	Suzuki GSX-R1000
46	(United Kingdom) Peter Dearden	10 April 2005	Paddock Hill Bend	British Superkart Championship	Clubmans Challenge	
47	(United Kingdom) Craig Jones	3 Aug 2008	Clark Curve	FIM World Supersport Championship		Honda CBR600RR
48	(United Kingdom) Ben Lightowler	28 Sep 2008	Paddock Hill Bend	British Motorcycle Racing Club	Stocksport 600	
49	(United Kingdom) Henry Surtees	19 July 2009	Westfield Bend	FIA Formula 2 Championship	2009 Brands Hatch Formula Two round	Williams JPH1 – Audi
50	(Germany) Karl-Heinz Kalbfell	17 August 2013	Druids	British Motorcycle Racing Club	Lansdowne Classic Series	Matchless
51	(United Kingdom) Frances Fletcher	7 October 2017	Clearways	Classic Racing Motorcycle Club		
52	(United Kingdom) Kyle O'Donovan	8 July 2018	Paddock Hill	British Motorcycle Racing Club	MRO Powerbikes	BMW S1000RR
53	(United Kingdom) Dan Thomas	13 July 2019	Pilgrim's Drop	British Motorcycle Racing Club	Rookie Minitwin	Suzuki SV650

== List of fatal accidents involving race officials ==
No	Official	Date	Place	Series	Race	Role
1	(United Kingdom) John Thorpe	5 March 1977	Stirlings	Shellsport International Championship	Shellsport G8 Championship	Fire Marshal
2	(United Kingdom) Robert Foote	31 July 2021	Paddock Hill	British Automobile Racing Club		Race Marshal

== List of fatal accidents during unofficial testing ==
No	Competitor	Date	Place	Entrant	Event	Type
1	(United Kingdom) Ronald Vincent	23 May 1959	Paddock Hill Bend		Private Test	Berkeley SE328
