= Chrome Specialties =

- Founded: 1984
- Defunct: 1998
- Fate: Merged with Global Motorsport/Custom Chrome Inc.
- Products: Custom motorcycle parts

Chrome Specialties was an American manufacturer and distributor of custom and replacement parts for Harley-Davidson motorcycles. Founded in 1984 by brothers John A. Kuelbs and Gregory G. Kuelbs, Chrome Specialties grew into one of the largest aftermarket motorcycle parts distributors in the world, offering over 12,000 products from a 900-page catalog. Chrome Specialties brands and products were available at over 3,500 retailers worldwide by the time it was merged with Global Motorsports/Custom Chrome Inc. in 1997. Chrome Specialties' original brands, such as Motor Factory, Highway One and Jammer, continue to be available worldwide.

== History ==
In 1984 the Kuelbs developed a basic line of custom and replacement parts for Harley-Davidsons and founded Chrome Specialties. Their vision was to supply every item needed for the Harley-Davidson rider. The brothers recognized early the potential of custom motorcycles. Demand for custom motorcycles, especially Harley-Davidsons, grew rapidly over the following two decades. Initially Chrome Specialties focused on custom parts, and introduced many bolt-on chrome accessories enabling bikers to personalize their motorcycles.

In 1987 Chrome Specialties introduced the Highway One and Dallas Leathers apparel lines, opening a manufacturing facility for leather motorcycle jackets in Dallas, Texas. As the Harley-Davidson craze swept through Hollywood many celebrities and rock stars looking for authentic biker gear wore the company's leather jackets.

In 1992, Chrome Specialties opened in Frankfurt, Germany. In the following years, the company's operations expanded to include offices or distributors in all major Western European countries. At the time of its merger in 1997, Chrome Specialties operated offices in five countries, and distributed motorcycle parts to 48 countries worldwide.

Chrome Specialties launched Motor Factory brand in 1993. The Motor Factory focused on "hard parts", offering engine and transmission parts made exclusively in the United States. The brand soon offered complete transmissions, as well as the internal motor components needed to build complete engines. Later in 1993, Chrome Specialties acquired the prominent Californian chopper builder Jammer Cycle.

In 1996, Chrome Specialties achieved an industry first by offering "scratch-built motorcycles" in its parts catalog. Everything needed to build a complete motorcycle was made available in one catalog, starting an era of "catalog customs", inspiring bike builders to start their own motorcycle manufacturing companies. Chrome Specialties' catalog and product line received industry awards, including Catalog of the Year awards from American Big Twin Dealer Magazine, Motorcycle Industry Magazine and European Dealer News.

In 1997, Chrome Specialties was merged with Global Motorsport/Custom Chrome Inc. From September 1997 to February 1999, Gustav Kuelbs was president of Chrome Specialties, then a subsidiary of the NASDAD-traded Global Motorsport Group Inc. In 1999, the Kuelbs brothers went on to found another independent company, World Factory Inc.
