= British Motorcycle Racing Club =

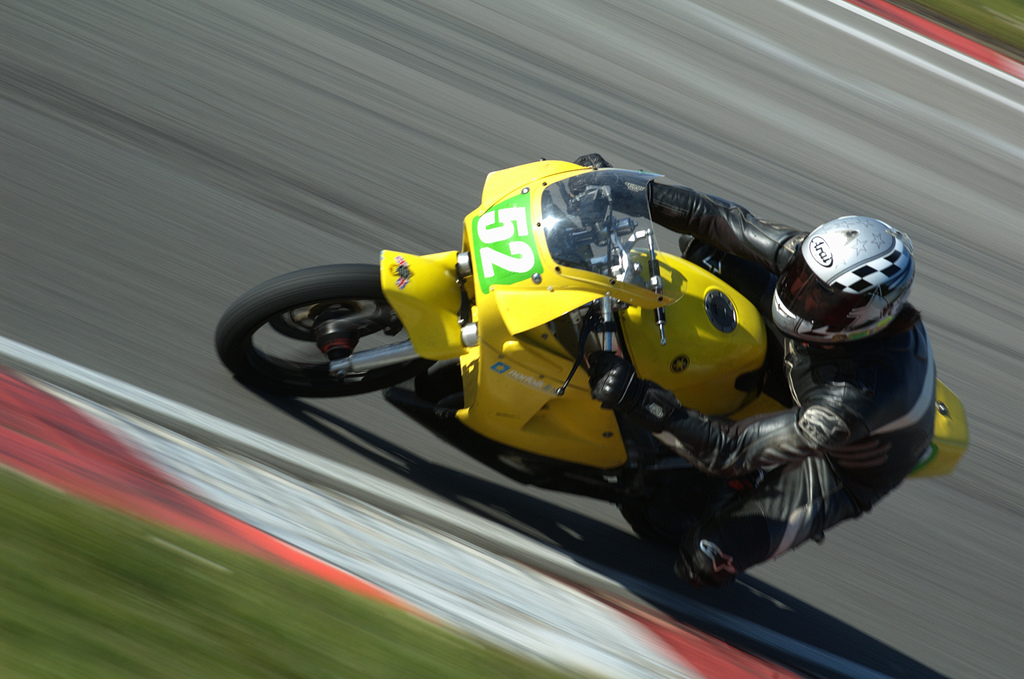
A BMCRC rider at Brands Hatch

The British Motorcycle Racing Club (BMCRC), informally Bemsee, is the largest motorcycle racing club of its type in the UK and organises a range of championships including Clubman and Supersport 600, Thunderbikes, Superstock 1000, Formula 400s and sidecars.

== History ==
Founded in 1909, it was originally based at the classic Brooklands circuit near Weybridge in Surrey. During the 1960s the offices were at Kingston, Surrey and are now located in Romford, Essex. It is the oldest motorcycle racing club in the world.

Many champions have emerged from starting out in the homemade Aprilia Superteens championship for example:

- Two Time world superbike champion James Toseland
- Double MotoGP champion Casey Stoner
- Moto2 Racer Bradley Smith
- Moto3 Racer Danny Webb
- MotoGP Racer and 2009 Supersport Champion Cal Crutchlow

== Racing Classes (2019) ==
In 2019, the BMCRC had classes available, based on machine type and rider age. Some classes also had sub-classes determined by various factors such as rider licence level (such as Clubman and National) or machine configuration:

- BMZRC 250 MZ
- "Blue Haze" GP 2-Strokes
- RKB-F1/BMCRC F1 & F2 Sidecars
- BMCRC Formula 400
- MRO 600
- MRO Minitwins
- MRO Powerbikes & Clubman 1000
- ACU Team Green Junior Cup/Senior Ninja Series
- BMCRC Rookie 600 & Rookie 1000 Open
- BMCRC Thunderbike Sport, Thunderbike Extreme & Thunderbike Ultra
- Yamaha Past Masters
- Junior Supersport

== Racing Classes (2027) ==
BMCRC has adopted the following classes for its 2027 season:

- NEW - BMCRC Classic Powerbike (classic and retro superbikes)
- MRO Powerbikes & Clubman 1000 (modern superbikes for Clubman and National riders)
- NEW - BMCRC DYMAG Naked Series (Modern day naked and supernaked bike classes)
- NEW ACU Nationwide Junior Cup (Developmental class for young racers with weight, age and power restrictions)
- NEW Nationwide Senior Cup (similar to the Junior Cup, without the age restriction)
- ACU Thunderbike 500 (Dedicated Honda CB500 Grid, offering fair and competitive one-make racing)
- BMCRC Open500 (Two and Four Stroke Category, only rule - 500cc maximum)
- BMCRC Rookie 600 (Modern or Retro 600cc Supersport Machinery for Rookie Licences holders)
- MRO 600 & Clubman 600 (Modern or Retro 600cc Supersport Machinery for Clubman or National Licences holders)
- MRO & Rookie Minitwins (Predominantly SV650, but other mid-capacity twin cylinder machines open to all licence holders with a rookie sub-class)
- Thunderbike Sport (Power to Weight and maximum power class, perfect for pre-injection 600cc machines and others, also has a rookie sub-class for 2027)
- Yamaha Past Masters AKA "YPM" (Two Stroke Yamahas, LC, TZR and YPVS series)
- BMZRC 250 MZ (250 MZ only class)
- BMCRC F1 & F2 Sidecars (F1 and F2 eligible machines)

== Club Officials (2027) ==
For 2027, BMCRC has the following officials list

- Mike Dommett - CEO
- Jeremy Hill - Chairman & Director of Rider Development
- Ted McDonald - Club President
- Peter Bartlett - Director & Medical Liaison Officer
- Andy Brown - Director & Clerk of the Course (ACU)
- Tony MacBride - (Director & Clerk of the Course (ACU)
- Mark Dent - Director & Chief Technical Official
- Jeff Matthews - Director (Ex-Chairman)
- Lottie Gray - Director & Chief of Startline
- Caroline Patterson - Director & Clerk of the Course (ACU)
- Den Grant - Director & Clerk of the Course
- Claire Hodgins - Race Secretary
- Karen Higgens - Chief Marshal
- Paul Whitby - YPM Rider Rep
- Kevin Lilley - Minitwin Rider Rep
- Konrad Breese - ACU Nationwide Junior & Senior Rider Rep
- Ben Scott - ACU Nationwide Junior & Senior Rider Rep
- Charlie Moss - Sidecar Rep
- Jake Anderton - MRO 600 & Clubman 600 Rider Rep
- Michael Mills - MRO 600 & Clubman 600 Deputy Rider Rep
- Adam Jamison - Thunderbike Sport Rider Rep
- James Fearn - Thunderbike Sport Deputy Rider Rep
- Alexander Mann - MZ Rider Rep
- Andy Houghton - Naked & Super Naked Rider Rep
- Shaun O'Hara - Thunderbike CB500 Rider Rep

== Circuits ==
BMCRC leased the Lydden Hill circuit from 1993 to 2007. The 2022 season used the following circuits:

- Brands Hatch (Indy and GP circuits)
- Snetterton
- Silverstone
- Oulton Park
- Donington Park
- Cadwell Park

BMCRC has released its 2027 calendar as:

- Oulton Park 25/27 March
- Brands Hatch Indy 23/25 April
- Donington Park GP 14/16 May
- Snetterton 300 11/13 June
- Cadwell Park 16/18 July
- Anglesey 20/22 August
- Mallory Park 18/19 September
