= Thunderbike =

- Industry: Motorcycle Manufacturer
- Founded: 1985
- Headquarters: Hamminkeln
- Key people: Andreas Bergerforth
- Products: Motorcycles
- Number of employees: 70
- Website: Official website

Thunderbike is a German motorcycle manufacturer, customizer, and official Harley-Davidson dealer.

== History ==
Thunderbike was founded in 1985, as a Suzuki dealer named Motorradschuppen (eng.: motorcycle shed) in the small town of Hamminkeln in western Germany. Between 1987 and 2001 the Thunderbike Team was successful at the German racing series Deutsche Langstreckenmeisterschaft and produced many customized sports bikes.

In 2003, Thunderbike began to customize Harley-Davidson motorcycles and started to create self-produced frames, custom-wheels and other parts. They reached the 2nd place at the AMD World Championship in 2006 and became one of the most successful European customizers.

== Corporate awards ==
- European Championship 2006 (1st Place)
- AMD World Championship 2006 (2nd Place)
- Rats Hole Show 2006 Sturgis, South Dakota: 2nd Place
- European Championship 2008 (1st Place)
- Rats Hole Show 2008 Sturgis, South Dakota: (2nd Place)
- European Biker Build Off 2008 @ Custombike Germany (1st Place)
- Cologne Custom Championship 2010 (1st Place Chopper/Cruiser)
- AMD World Championship 2012 (1st Place)

== Gallery ==
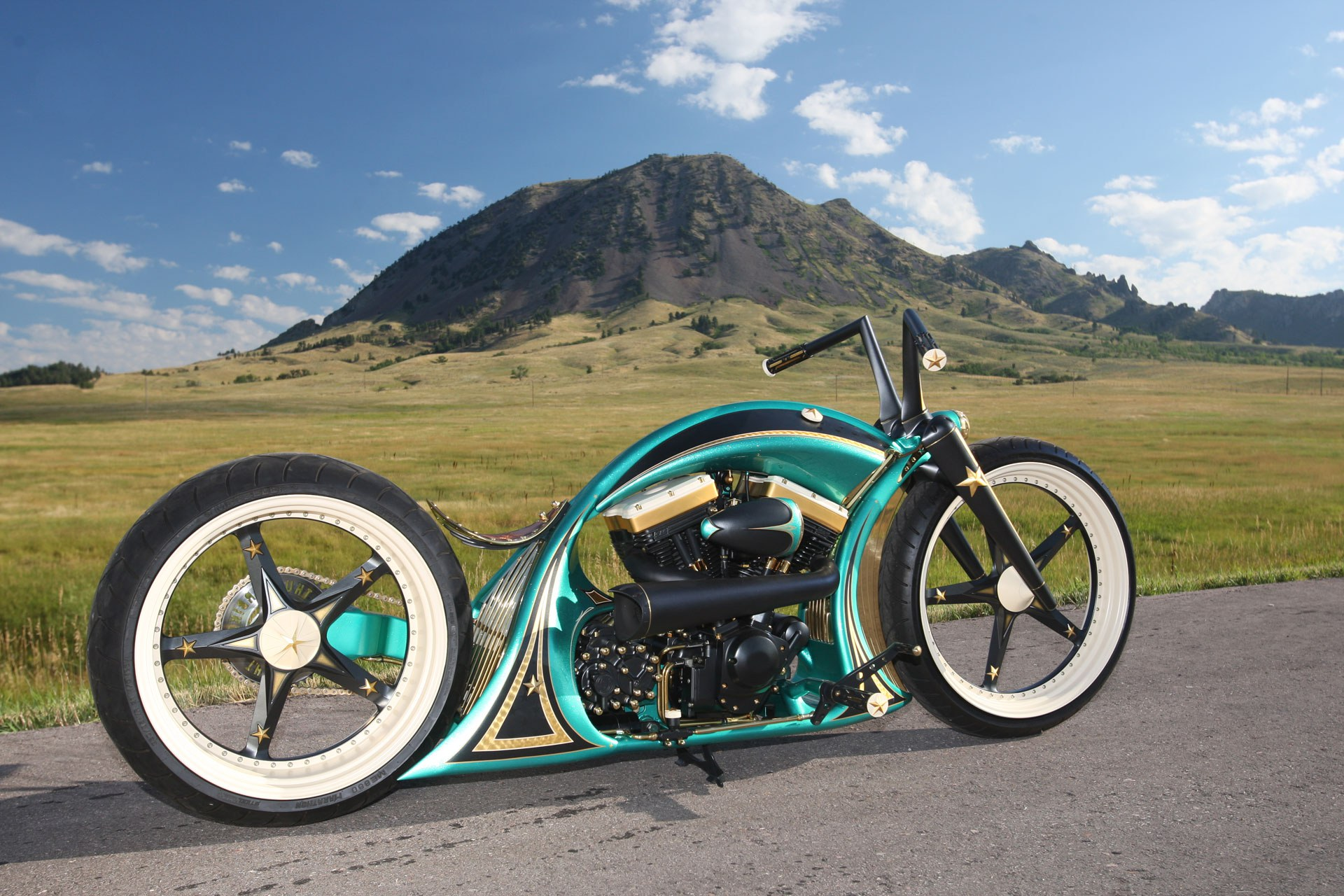
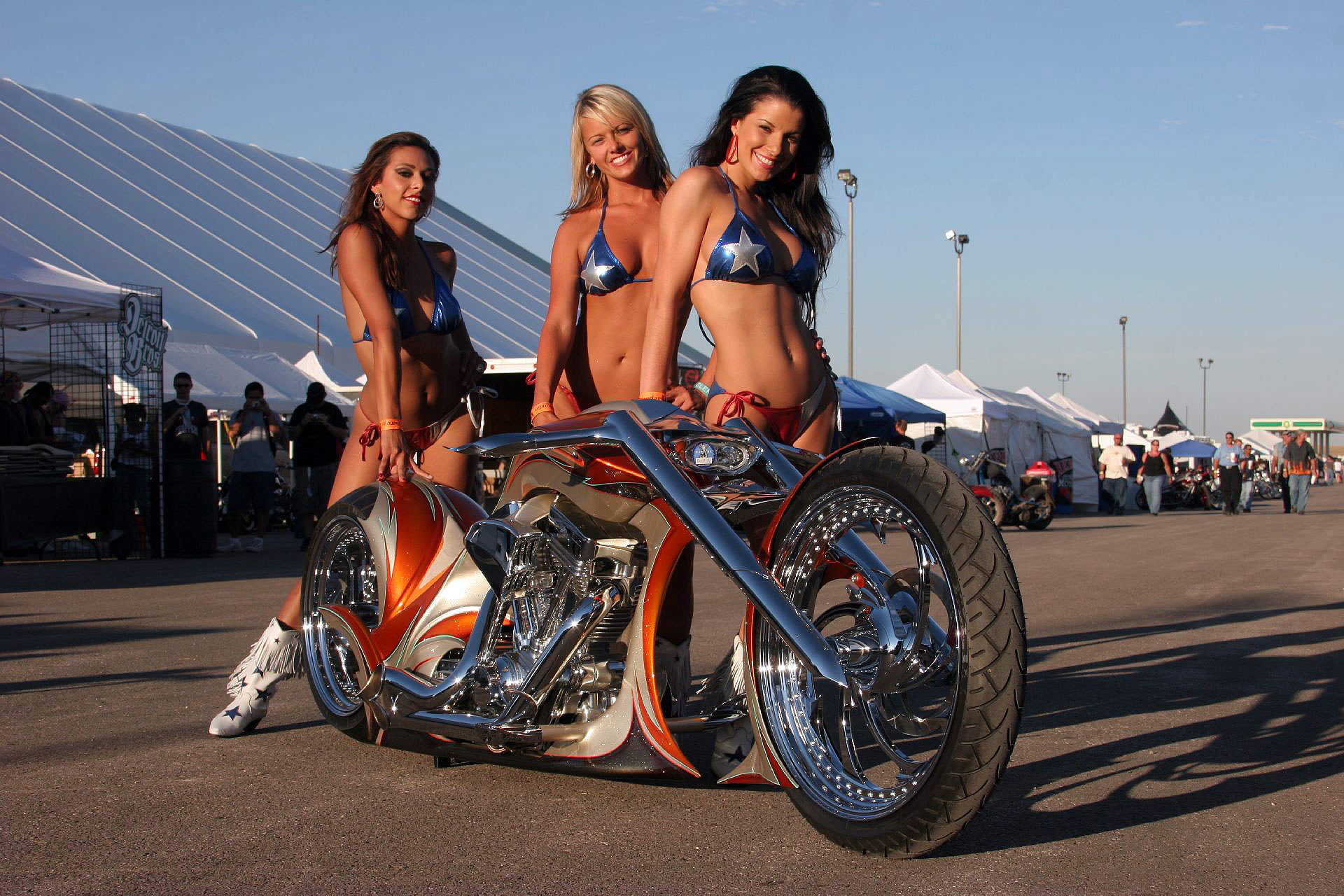
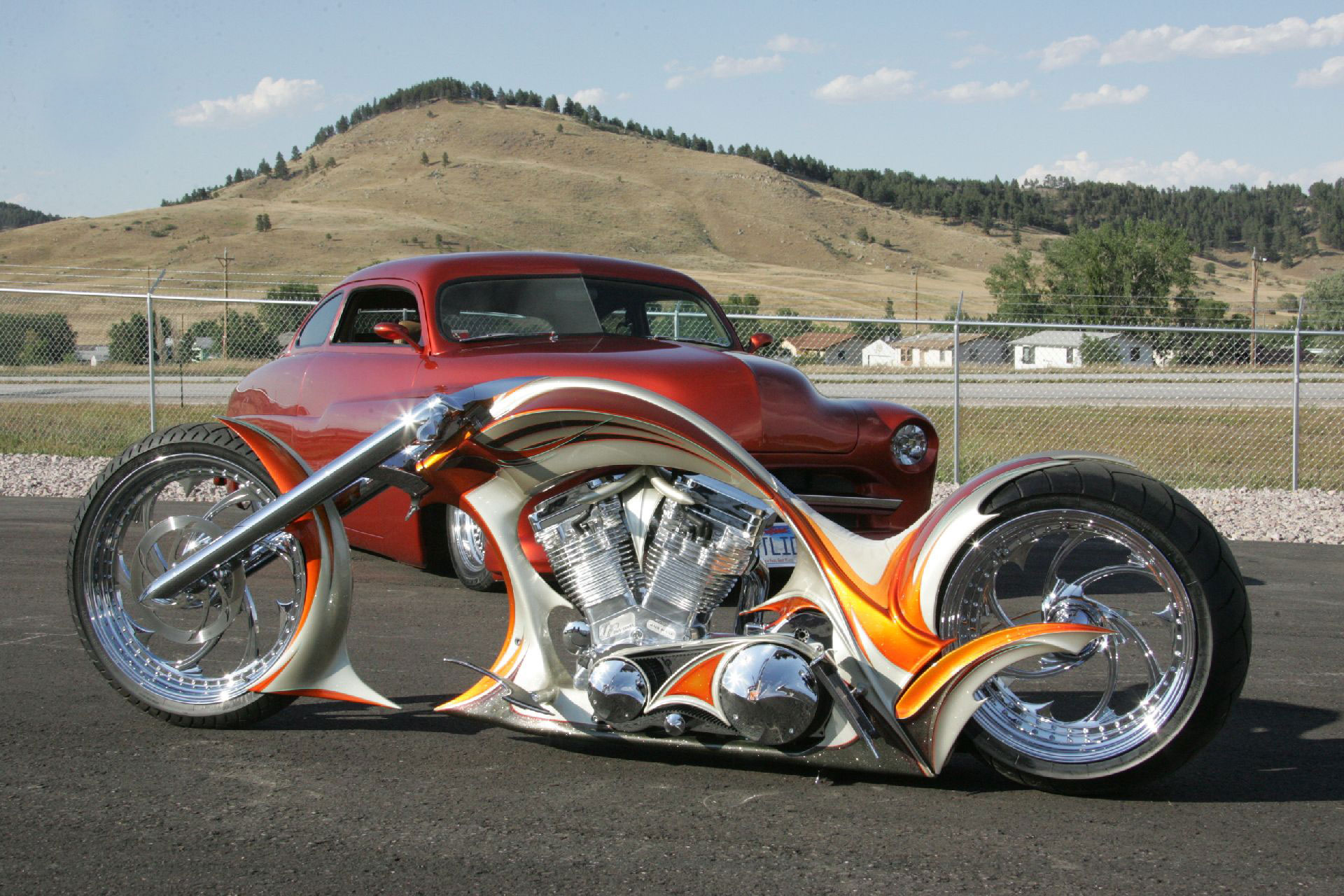
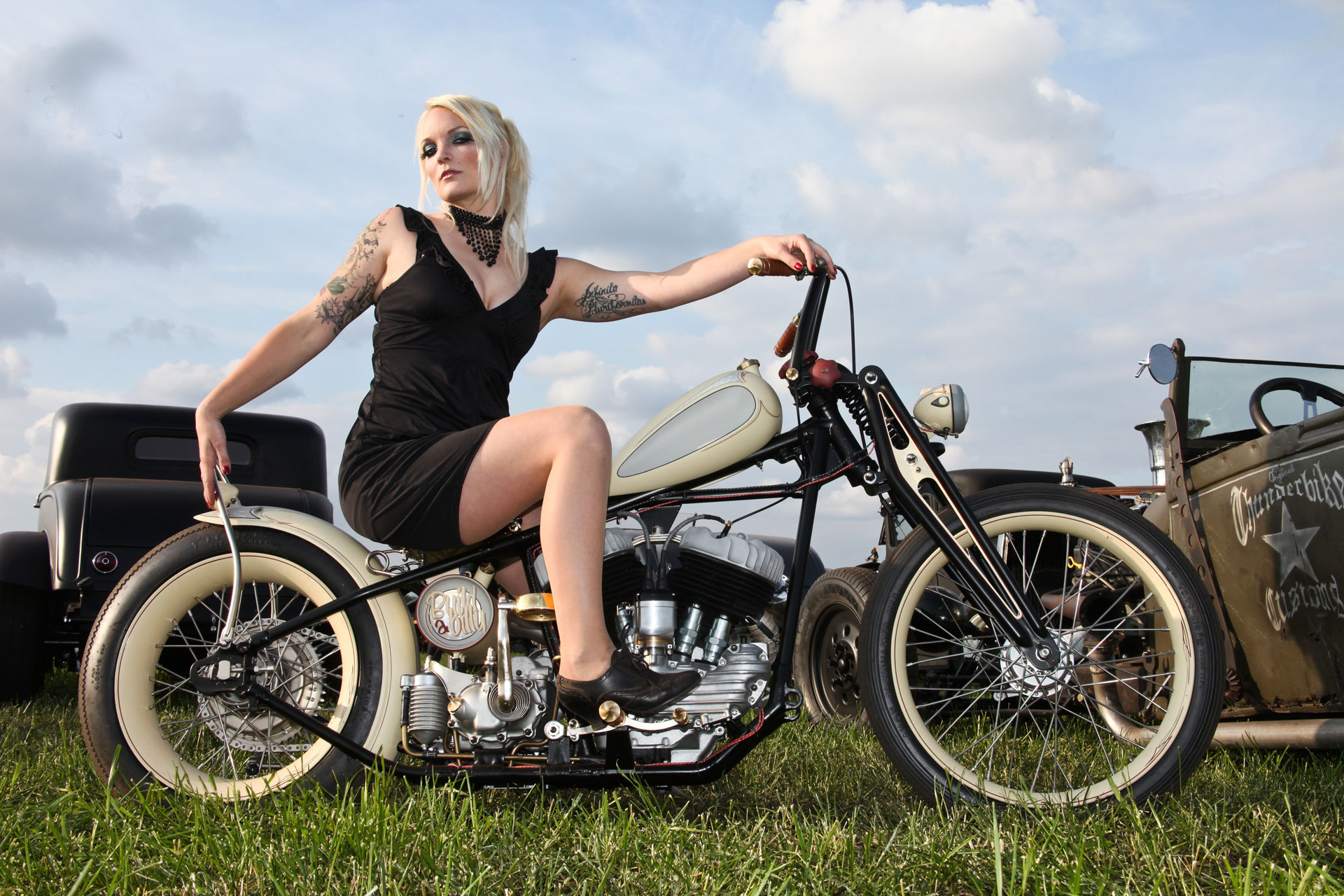
Thunderbike models
