= World Championship of Custom Bike Building =

The World Championship of Custom Bike Building is a competition held annually by American Motorcycle Dealer (AMD) magazine.

The first competition was held in 2004 as an extension of the AMD ProShow custom engineering competition held in Europe in conjunction with Custom Chrome since 2002, which by some was already unofficially acknowledged as a European championship The top three finishers from the European Championship are rewarded with an entry to the World Championship and an expenses contribution to help with bike freight costs. There are also a number of affiliate events in various countries in Western Europe as well as in Russia, Japan, Australia and Mexico. The winner of each Affiliate event also wins expenses towards competing at the World Championship each year. The judging of the World Championship is done by 'peer review', in that all competitors collectively decide the winner, together with a select panel of invited judges from the press and aftermarket industry.

== Classes ==
- Freestyle (World Championship) - The Freestyle Class accepts all bikes of any design and/or with any modifications. The winner of this class will be declared World Champion Custom Bike Builder for the period of one year.
- Modified Harley-Davison - Frame and engine case must be original Harley-Davidson, any modifications to the frame and the motors cylinders or heads are accepted.
- Production Manufacturer - This class is designed for entrants whose principal business is selling production motorcycles, all entries must be manufactured in 50 or more units per year.
- Metric World Championship - All entries must be built around an import metric-based engine. The winner of this class will be declared Metric World Champion Custom Bike Builder for the period of one year.

== Official voting results ==
=== 2004 World Championship ===
Company and/or builder	Bike name	Country	Points
Goldammer Cycle Works	2004 Goldammer Board Tracker	Canada	-
Independent Cycle	2004 ICI Hardlife	United States	-
harish Motorcycles	30 Spirit	India	-

=== 2005 World Championship ===
Company	Bike name	Country	Points
Goldammer Cycle Works	Trouble	Canada	577
Independent Cycles	2005 Hardlife	United States	379
Krugger Motorcycles	Speedbowl	Belgium	319

=== 2005 European Championship ===
Company and/or builder	Bike name	Country	Points
Habermann-Performance		Germany	408
Violator Motorcycles	Full Metal Jacket	Netherlands	377
Mr Moore Custom Craft	Viridian	Finland	329

=== 2006 World Championship ===
Company	Bike name	Country	Points
Chicara Motorcycles	Chicara Art	Japan	598
Thunderbike	Spectacula	Germany	359
SE Service	Esox Lucius	Sweden	304

=== 2006 European Championship ===
Company	Bike name	Country	Points
Thunderbike	Spectacula	Germany	201
SE Service	Esox Lucius	Sweden	162
Red Baron Choppers	Revenge	Belgium	118

=== 2007 World Championship ===
Company	Bike name	Country	Points
SE Service	Hulster 8 valve	Sweden	513
Chicara Motorcycles	Chicara Art 2	Japan	488
Hot-Dock Custom Cycles	Red Gladiator	Japan	419

=== 2007 European Championship ===
Company	Bike name	Country	Points
Sapka Muvek	The Time Machine	Hungary	554
Art of Racer	Rock n' Bike	France	530
Riverside Motorcyclettes	The Crosser	France	476

=== 2008 World Championship ===
Company	Bike name	Country	Points
Goldammer Cycle Works	Goldmember	Canada	637
Hot-Dock Custom Cycles	Nautilus	Japan	466
TGS Motorcycles	Seppster 2 Ice Racer	Germany	403

=== 2008 European Championship ===
Company	Bike name	Country	Points
Thunderbike	Open Mind	Germany	560
Riverside Motocyclettes	Sugarland Express	France	547
TGS Motorcycles	Seppster 2 Ice Racer	Germany	537

=== 2009 World Championship ===
Company	Bike name	Country	Points
Cook Customs	Rambler	United States	597
Kris Krome Customs	Re-flex-tion	United States	498
Krugger Speedshop	Overmile	Belgium	454

=== 2009 European Championship ===
Company	Bike name	Country	Points
Big Twin Motors	Panster	Italy	432
SE Service	Harrier	Sweden	408
Flying Choppers	Cloud 9	Finland	373

=== 2010 World Championship ===
Company	Bike name	Country	Points
Krugger Motorcycles	Veon	Belgium	548
Thunderstruck Custom Bikes Inc	Sniper	United States	384
Shif Custom (YSC)	The Machine	Latvia	366

=== 2010 European Championship ===
Company	Bike name	Country	Points
Garage65	KCosmodrive	Italy	637
Headbanger Motorcycles	Morning Sunrise	Italy	477
Cycle Kraft / Ken's Factory	One Eyed King	United States / Japan	431

=== 2011 World Championship ===
Company and/or builder	Bike name	Country	Points
Tavax Engineering	Tavax 2011V	Japan	562
Lamb Engineering	Son of a Gun	United Kingdom	487
Kraus Motor Co	Bolide	United States	423

=== 2012 World Championship ===
Company and/or builder	Bike name	Country	Points
Thunderbike	PainTTless	Germany	631
LC Fabrications	Old Black	United States	509
Abnormal Cycles	Speed-Demon	Italy	431

=== 2013 World Championship ===
Company and/or builder	Bike name	Country	Points
Medaza Cycles	Rondine	Ireland	728
Zen Motorcycles	Tribute to Hagakure	France	432
Rocket Bobs	Gas'd Rat	United Kingdom	390

=== 2014 World Championship ===
Company and/or builder	Bike name	Country	Points
Krugger Motorcycles	Nurb's	Belgium	711
Waylon Machinery	WSA	Finland	551
North Coast Custom	Fiat Arbath	Italy	477

=== 2016 World Championship ===
Company and/or builder	Bike name	Country	Points
Suicide Customs Inc	Rumble Racer	Japan	668
Naumann & Co.	Simple Iron	Germany	482
Krugger Motorcycles	LADD (old dragstrip from Alaska)	Belgium	473

=== 2018 World Championship ===
Company and/or builder	Bike name	Country	Points
Zillers Garage	Insomnia	Russia	668
Eastern Bobber	Bone X	Malaysia	482
Marusius	Speedster King	Hungary	473

== Affiliate events ==
Entrants in these events can be rewarded with free entries to the European or world championships.

- Arneitz Custom Show - Faaker See, Austria
- Bigtwin Bikeshow & Expo - Rosmalen, Netherlands
- Cool Breaker Custom Show - Yokohama, Japan
- Gold Coast Bike Week - Carrara, Queensland, Australia
- Cologne Custom Championship - Cologne, Germany
- Irish Motorbike & Scooter Show - Dublin, Ireland
- Llunatica Benicassim - Benicassim, Spain
- Mad Builders Custom Show - Jocotepec, Mexico
- Moscow Custom & Tuning Show - Moscow, Russia
- Moto Clube Faro Bike Show - Faro, Algarve, Portugal
- Motor Bike Expo - Verona, Italy
- MULAFEST International Bike Show - Madrid, Spain
- Swedish Custom Bike Show - Norrtälje, Sweden
- Viva La Clusaz! - La Clusaz, France
