= Monster Garage =

American reality television series

- Created by: Thom Beers
- Presented by: Jesse James
- Country of origin: United States
- Original language: English
- No. of seasons: 5
- No. of episodes: 80

Production
- Running time: 42 minutes

Original release
- Network: Discovery Channel (2002–2006); Discovery+ (2021)
- Release: June 23, 2002 – June 12, 2006

Monster Garage is an American reality television series that aired on the Discovery Channel and hosted by Jesse James. Each episode was an hour in length and was conceived and produced (along with James) by Thom Beers.

The show premiered on June 23, 2002, and concluded on June 12, 2006.

On February 24, 2020, it was announced that the series will be revived and premiere in 2020 on TLC. This was delayed due to the COVID-19 pandemic. It premiered on Discovery, Inc.'s new streaming service Discovery+ on launch day, January 4, 2021.

== Premise ==
A team of five people with mechanical, fabricating, or modifying expertise was assembled to modify a vehicle into a "monster machine." On the show this generally meant making one vehicle that could transform into another such as a PT Cruiser which could change into a wood chipper, or a school bus which transformed into a pontoon boat. Occasionally vehicles were modified so as to hide non-vehicular functions, such as a police car which doubled as a donut shop (built by a team of cops), or a Toyota Tundra which was modified so as to allow it to discharge a motorcycle at high speeds. Build teams who successfully completed their assignment were rewarded with expensive tool kits.

== Rules ==
According to the show, the rules were as follows:

1. When complete, the monster was to appear to be stock.
2. The team had $3000 (later raised to $5000) for parts. Any 'seat change' found during the build was added to the total.
3. The team had seven days to complete the monster.
  - The first day was for designing
  - the next five were for building
  - and the seventh day was for testing the monster

In practice, as the series progressed, some liberties were taken with the first two rules, at times becoming punchlines. In one episode, when a Chevrolet El Camino was turned into a Figure 8 race car, James discarded plans for a spoiler on the vehicle, sarcastically citing the first rule.

Starting with season 4, the winning team also donated a toolkit to a high school of their choice.

== Host ==
Host Jesse James claims to be the great-great-grandson of a cousin of the legendary wild west outlaw, Jesse James. Jesse G. James has both mechanical and metal fabricating expertise and is the founder, owner and head bike builder for his custom chopper shop, West Coast Choppers. Jesse said he liked monsters that went fast and did something. He preferred hard working build crew members. His favorite monster vehicles were the Ford Ambulance Wheel-stander and the Chevrolet Blazer Pikes Peak hill climber. One of Jesse's ambitions throughout the run of the show was to build a monster that could top 200 mph, which he was unsuccessful at achieving.

== Announcer ==
Announcing for this show was done by Brett "The Big Schwag" Wagner who later became the host of the Speed Channel show Pass Time. He was very memorable for frequently shouting out "You gotta be kidding me!" during the tests of the "monster" vehicles and signing off most episodes saying: "The next Monster Garage challenge is JUST... AROUND... THE BEND!".

== Failed Monsters ==
With rules as strict as they were in the Monster Garage, there was a 1 in 10 monster build failure rate. When a team failed to complete a vehicle in time, it was destroyed by host Jesse James.

Failed Monsters and their Ultimate Demise

- Cadillac Hearse/Car Crusher "Grim Ripper" — was the first failure on Monster Garage. The build team spent more time goofing off than building the car. In one scene, the original Batmobile appeared at the shop, and Jesse quipped "tryin' to weld" when asked what he was doing. The non-functional Car Crusher was then sent to Terminal Island to meet its fate in a scrapper. At the suggestion of the scrap machine's owner, the Hearse came to an explosive end with a propane tank in the back. In Grim Ripper II, the team spoofed the demise of their first project by having the car in which they arrived at Terminal Island meet the same fate as the first hearse.
- Scion xA/Rock'em, Sock'em Scions — In this two-episode special, Jesse handpicked a team of the best Monster Garage participants at the time, while the producers picked a "mis-fit" team of quirky and somewhat anti-social participants to build Rock'em Sock'em Robots out of two new Scions. The winning team would win a "special edition" set of Mac tools while the other team would see their creation turned into scrap. Jesse's handpicked team, dubbed the Red Rockers, secured the Scion xB, while the producer-selected Blue Bombers received the xA. In the challenge, the Bombers' xA suffered transmission issues, meaning the Rockers won by default. Some members of the Bombers stayed to see their failed monster off, only to find out that they would be receiving tool sets as well.
- DeLorean Hovercraft — In an early attempt to shave time off the build, the team removed the outer bodywork of a De Lorean and put it on a donor personal hovercraft. Quite angry about this decision (even though he himself declared early on that he didn't like the project), Jesse fired one of the team members after a snide comment. Working again with a "new" De Lorean donor, the team tried unsuccessfully to make the monster hover but ultimately ran out of time. The car was eventually towed to a naval base where a tank tracked vehicle crushed the unfinished vehicle.
- Mazda Miata Jetski — Some fans have noted that the reason why this build failed was the engine might have contributed to the air intake being flooded due to the heavy weight in the nose area. Nevertheless, three members of the build team opted to send the Miata to the scrapheap with a dynamite explosion.
- Dirt Track Camaro — For the second time in MG history, this build had an all-girl build team (the first was the Black Widow Demolition Derby Car, which was heavily gutted moments before a demolition derby). However, a plague of miscommunication and personal differences sent this Camaro to a steel smelter and eventual recycling into rebar.
- Peel Trident Micro Car — With a team composed of mostly dwarves, the team attempted to put a Hayabusa engine into a tiny Peel Car. Some fans felt that the team was compromised due to their small stature, but Jesse coldly stated that he gave no team any exceptions; they were all equal. Other fans feel the project was simply too ambitious for builders of any size. After they failed, Jesse, sporting some of his personal gun collection, took out the Peel with a .50 caliber sniper rifle.
- Anglia Nitro Dragster — The team did not give themselves enough time to fire up the engine. The engine ended up not firing due to timing issues, and Jesse brought it to a construction site where a crane dropped a large metal box on it.

== Successful monsters destroyed in Day 7 ==
- Mazda RX-7/Doom Buggy — Unsatisfied with how the Sandrail performed, Jesse destroyed it with a Dillon Minigun.
- 1970 Cadillac Coupe DeVille/Demolition-Derby Car - In day 7, Cindy Regimbald lost the demolition derby, leaving the car smashed from the derby.
- 1970 Oval Racer/RC Car - During the challenge, after Jesse lapped the car about 5 times, he rammed his car into the quarter panel of it and sent it smashing into wall of the short track. The monster was totalled, and it was stored outside the Monster Garage, later to be cannibalized in future episodes.
- 1969-1970 Classic Farm Tractor/Crop Circler - The vehicle was built successfully, but Jesse decided the project was uninteresting, so he burnt it in a desert with a flamethrower.

== Episodes ==
Season	Episodes	Originally released	
Season	Episodes	First released	Last released
1	22	June 23, 2002	June 16, 2003
2	20	July 7, 2003	April 19, 2004
3	23	May 10, 2004	June 13, 2005
4	10	October 10, 2005	December 12, 2005
5	10	December 12, 2005	June 12, 2006

== UK version ==
A UK version of the show was aired in 2004 by Channel 4. The team always included a Hell's Angel known as "Cookie". There was a budget of £3,000. Only 3 days were used for the build. Cars often looked radically different from the production models. Challenges included; converting a Toyota into a lawnmower, a Lotus into a hovercraft, and an ice cream van into a riot truck. In one episode, the team sold the internal fittings of the car that was to be transformed (A Rolls-Royce) to raise funds to convert it into a muck spreader.

The UK series lasted only 8 episodes.

== Videos ==
MBI published Monster Garage videos, detailing the Ford Mustang lawn mower, Ford Explorer garbage truck, limousine firetruck, and the Volkswagen Beetle swamp boat.

== Monster Garage sale ==
The 2008 Barrett-Jackson Scottsdale auction included 42 of the surviving project vehicles.

== Adaptations ==
=== Video games ===
Invictus Games Ltd. developed a PC video game, based on the series. An Xbox remake was made by Impulse Games in 2004. Both games were published by Activision Value.

=== Books ===
Inside Monster Garage, a book about the TV series, was published by Meridith Books.

MBI Publishing Company has published Monster Garage instruction books under the Motorbooks brand, including:

- Monster Garage: How to Custom Paint Damn Near Anything
- Monster Garage: How to Customize Damn Near Anything
- Monster Garage: How to Fabricate Damn Near Anything
- Monster Garage: How to Weld Damn Near Anything

Monster Garage: How to Custom Paint Damn Near Anything, Monster Garage: How to Customize Damn Near Anything, Monster Garage: How to Weld Damn Near Anything were also sold together as Monster Garage Gift Set and The Big Box of Monster Garage (box set).
