= Roger Goldammer =

Canadian motorcycle builder (born 1969)

- Born: 1969 (age 56–57); Canada
- Occupations: Motorcycle builder Engine builder
- Website: Goldammer Cycles website

Roger Goldammer (born 1969) is a Canadian motorcycle builder most known for winning the World championship of bike building three times.

== Professional career ==
Roger Goldammer and his company Goldammer Cycle Works was most known for building futuristic custom bikes, for customers as well as billet frontends. In 2004 Roger entered the AMD worldchampionship with a bike very different from his earlier work, the bike which was inspired by early boardtrack racing bikes and featured innovations such as an oiltank built into the frame and hidden suspension for the rear swingarm. After the voting was over Goldammer was crowned world champion.

This gave Goldammer a lot of publicity and he returned the next year to the championship with a similar concept called "Trouble", which featured a V-Twin engine converted into a single-cylinder engine and fitted with a supercharger and a front end with the suspension built into the frame's neck. the bike won the championship with a margin of over 200 points, this was the only time a builder had taken the trophy twice in a row. Due to his success Goldammer decided not to build any more bikes for customers and only build bikes for himself in order to have complete creative control; his company continued to produce aftermarket parts to support his custom bike buildings.

In 2007 Goldammer didn't enter a bike into the competition and opted to participate in the Biker Build-Off where he competed on the Bonneville Salt Flats against Matt Hotch of Hot Match Custom Cycles. Goldammer based his bike "Experimental" on a Honda CR 250 dirtbike frame which was severely modified and fitted with dual KRC supercart motors. The bike achieved a topspeed of 128.774 mph which was enough to take the trophy.

In 2007 Goldammer debuted a new bike called "Nortorious" which was heavily influenced by the Norton Manx cafe racer. The engine concept from his bike "Trouble" was used but with a rear cylinder head mounted on the single remaining front cylinder and equipped with a fuel injection system. The bike won Goldammer the Canadian bike building championship which earned him a free ticket to the 2008 World Championship.

Goldammer soon revealed that "Nortorious" would not be his entry to the 2008 championship but Goldammer soon revealed that he was building a bike with the ambition to race on the Bonneville Salt Flats and win the bike building championship. The bike which he called "Goldmember" featured the same engine concept as the "Nortorious" with the addition of a nitrous oxide system and achieved a speed of 164 mph in bare metal, The bike was later painted and entered in the 2008 championship were the bike won with a margin of over 150 points.

== Awards and achievements ==
- 1st Place AMD World Championships 2008
- 1st Canadian Championships 2007
- Winner Biker Build Off 2006
- British Columbia Creative Achievement Award Recipient 2006
- 1st Place Artistry In Iron Vegas Bikefest/Hot Rod Bike 2005
- 1st Place AMD World Championship 2005
- Most Innovative Builder VQ/Easyriders Daytona 2004
- 1st Place Easyriders Portland Judged Class 2004
- 1st Place Easyriders Portland Spectator Class 2004
- 2nd Place Easyriders Columbus Invitational Class 2004
- 1st Place AMD World Championships 2004
- 1st Place Artistry in Iron Vegas Bikefest/Hot Rod Bikes 2004
- Most innovative Product Street Chopper 2003
- New product of the Year V Twin Expo 2002
- 1st Place Overall Oakland Roadster Show 53rd Annual 2002
- 1st Place Best Engineered Bike Oakland Roadster Show 53rd Annual 2002
