= Bigtoe =

Tall Swedish custom motorcycle

- Manufacturer: Tom Wiberg
- Production: 1998
- Assembly: Sweden
- Class: Custom motorcycle
- Engine: Jaguar V12
- Top speed: 62 mph (100 km/h)
- Dimensions: H: 7.5 ft (2.3 m)
- Weight: 3,600 lb (1,600 kg) (dry)

Bigtoe is a custom motorcycle that once held the Guinness World Record in the category of "Tallest Rideable Motorcycle", bearing a maximum height of 7.5 ft (2.3 m) and a top speed of 62 mph (100 km/h). It weighs 3,600 lb (1,600 kg). Tom Wiberg, from Sweden, built it in 1998 powered by a Jaguar V12 engine.

The title later passed to Dream Big, a motorcycle built by Greg Dunham in 2005. Wiberg also held the record for the smallest rideable motorcycle with Smalltoe.
