= West Coast Choppers =

Brand

- Type: Private
- Founded: 1992 or 1993 in Paramount, California, U.S.
- Fate: In Business
- Headquarters: Austin, Texas, U.S.
- Key people: Jesse James
- Products: Branded clothing and other tie-in merchandise, choppers
- Revenue: US$ 6 million
- Number of employees: 50
- Website: westcoastchoppers.com

West Coast Choppers ('WCC") is a brand that began selling screen-printed T-shirts and stickers with the company's Iron cross/Maltese cross logo while founder and "master marketer" Jesse James was finishing high school, packaging the accoutrements of the chopper lifestyle long before any actual West Coast Choppers customs had been ordered or sold. Even after the company began building custom choppers, 60% of revenue still came from sales of WCC-branded marketing tie-ins such as clothing, beverages and tools. Yearly sales of approximately 12–15 motorcycles at prices of around US$150,000 each actually lost money for the company, but attracted positive attention. Publicizing the names of celebrity clients, including Shaquille O'Neal, Kid Rock, Keanu Reeves, Ty Law of the Denver Broncos, wrestling star Bill Goldberg, actor Tyson Beckford, and NFL running back Jamal Anderson, was a central feature of the WCC marketing strategy. The other key to this strategy was the star power of Jesse James, presented mainly through television on the Discovery Channel in the Motorcycle Mania series and the 2002–2006 series Monster Garage.

The Long Beach, California headquarters of West Coast Choppers shut down in 2010, but later reopened in 2013 with a new headquarters in Austin, Texas.

== History ==
Founded in the early 1990s West Coast Choppers gained notice with the 2001 shows Motorcycle Mania I and II, on the Discovery Channel. In 2004 James starred with Kid Rock in Motorcycle Mania III. With the release of these shows interest in Jesse James and the West Coast Choppers allowed the firm to expand knowledge of its brand and to expand its following. Jesse James also narrated a 2006 Discovery show called History of the Chopper, where he makes his own motorcycle to commemorate the 1960s.

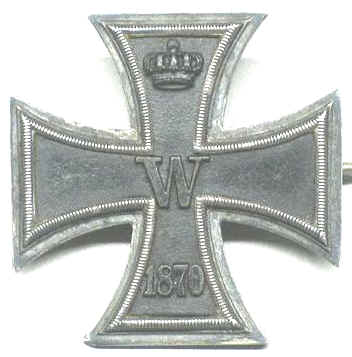
1870 Iron Cross

Maltese Cross

Bundeswehr logo

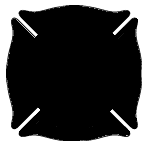
St. Florian Cross

In 2004, the company's merchandise, along with the No Fear brand, was banned from the Simi Valley Unified School District in California for using the German Iron Cross, in reaction to violence between black and white students. Jesse James and a spokesman for No Fear have said the cross is based on the Maltese cross and does not represent white power or Nazism. James said the cross is used by many fire departments, for example. A skateboarding store employee pointed out that West Coast Choppers sells a T-shirt which combines both the cross symbol and a WWII German-style helmet, representing "things he'd rather not be associated with." A similar ban in Las Vegas, Nevada in 2003 drew protests from students.

In 2005 West Coast Choppers agreed to pay $35,000 to settle a claim by the Business Software Alliance that unlicensed copyrighted software was used in the design of the company's motorcycles.

In 2007 Jesse James was fined over a quarter-million dollars because West Coast Choppers sold more than 50 motorcycles from 1998 to 2005 that failed to comply with the air pollution limits of the California Air Resources Board (CARB). James explained that he was unaware of rule changes that required small-volume manufactures to comply with regulations. James said the CARB refused his offer to recall and modify the uncompliant choppers. Since 2005 West Coast Choppers has built emissions-compliant choppers. James said the fines were excessive and intended to make an example of him due to his company's fame and his celebrity marriage to actress Sandra Bullock, but CARB spokesmen stated their enforcement efforts were aimed at the entire custom industry, and further that they were aware of no offer by West Coast Choppers to recall the motorcycles in question.

In 2008 West Coast Choppers worked with the City of Long Beach to design steel artwork that will be placed in concrete planters between two city streets. West Coast Choppers also designed the "Long Beach 2030 Plan Van," a mobile classroom that will be used to promote the city's long range planning projects. The City of Long Beach renamed part of a street as "West Coast Choppers Place" in 2009 to honor the company.

In 2009 West Coast Choppers stopped selling motorcycle customizing parts, offering only complete bikes, or clothing and other non-bike merchandise. Jesse James was reported to be trying to exercise more personal control over production, and to "battle knockoffs and establish a measure of quality control."

In October 2010, West Coast Choppers closed the shop in Long Beach. James' other Long Beach business, Cisco Burgers, remained, but no other details of the closing were announced, and it was not clear whether James would continue operations from his new home in Texas. Cisco Burgers has since also closed shop. The website westcoastchoppers.com redirected to www.westcoastchoppers-australasia.com, which sells merchandise with the West Coast Choppers brand and logo, operated by Rev Head Apparel under a license agreement with Jesse James. However, Jesse James, decided to open the company back up in 2013.

In 2019, it launched the KIMI by West Coast Choppers range of merchandise, in partnership with Kimi Raikkonen, 2007 F1 World Champion.

== Marketing ==
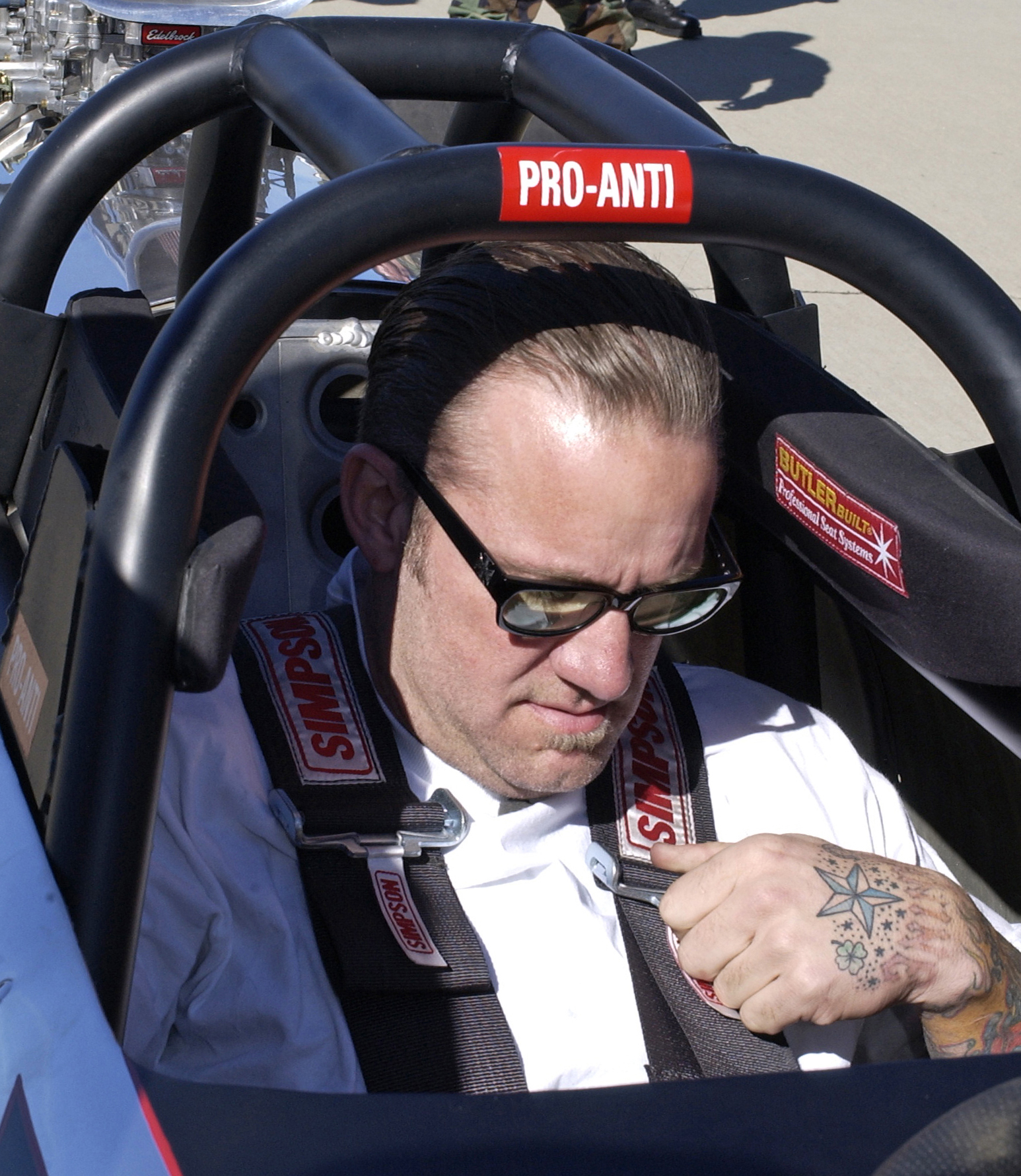
The personality behind the brand, Jesse James

The star personality of the company's founder and president Jesse James is a key asset in the marketing of the West Coast Choppers image. Monster Garage producer Thom Beers describes him as, "the perfect Gen-X antihero. He doesn't want to be worshiped ... he really believes in what he does, and he has a great sense of style." Advertising Age Editor-in-Chief Scott Donaton says James is a, "relatable bad boy with blue-collar appeal" adding that West Coast Choppers, "has made a lot out of this bad boy image, has made a lot out of this connection to the name Jesse James and this sort of Wild West romance," which will remain profitable for years to come so long as it is "authentic." James is compared with entrepreneurs like Martha Stewart and Coco Chanel for his ability to turn an image into multiple lines of profitable fashions.

The celebrity clients who order WCC bikes are a main avenue of promotion. The motorcycle made for Shaquille O'Neal cost US$150,000 and was customized for the athlete's 338 lb (153 kg) weight and 49 in (120 cm) inseam, and enormous hands, resulting in a dramatic 11.5 feet (3.5 m) long bike with footpegs made for size 24 feet. The result was, "priceless publicity".

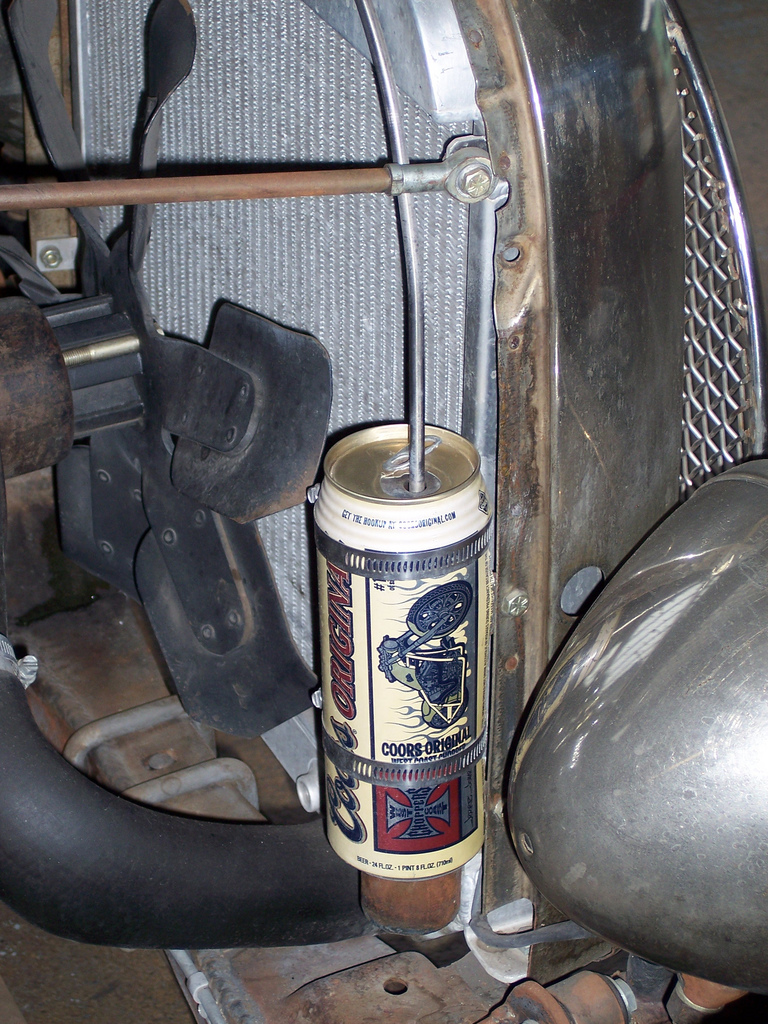
WCC/Coors tie-in beer can adapted as a hotrod part.

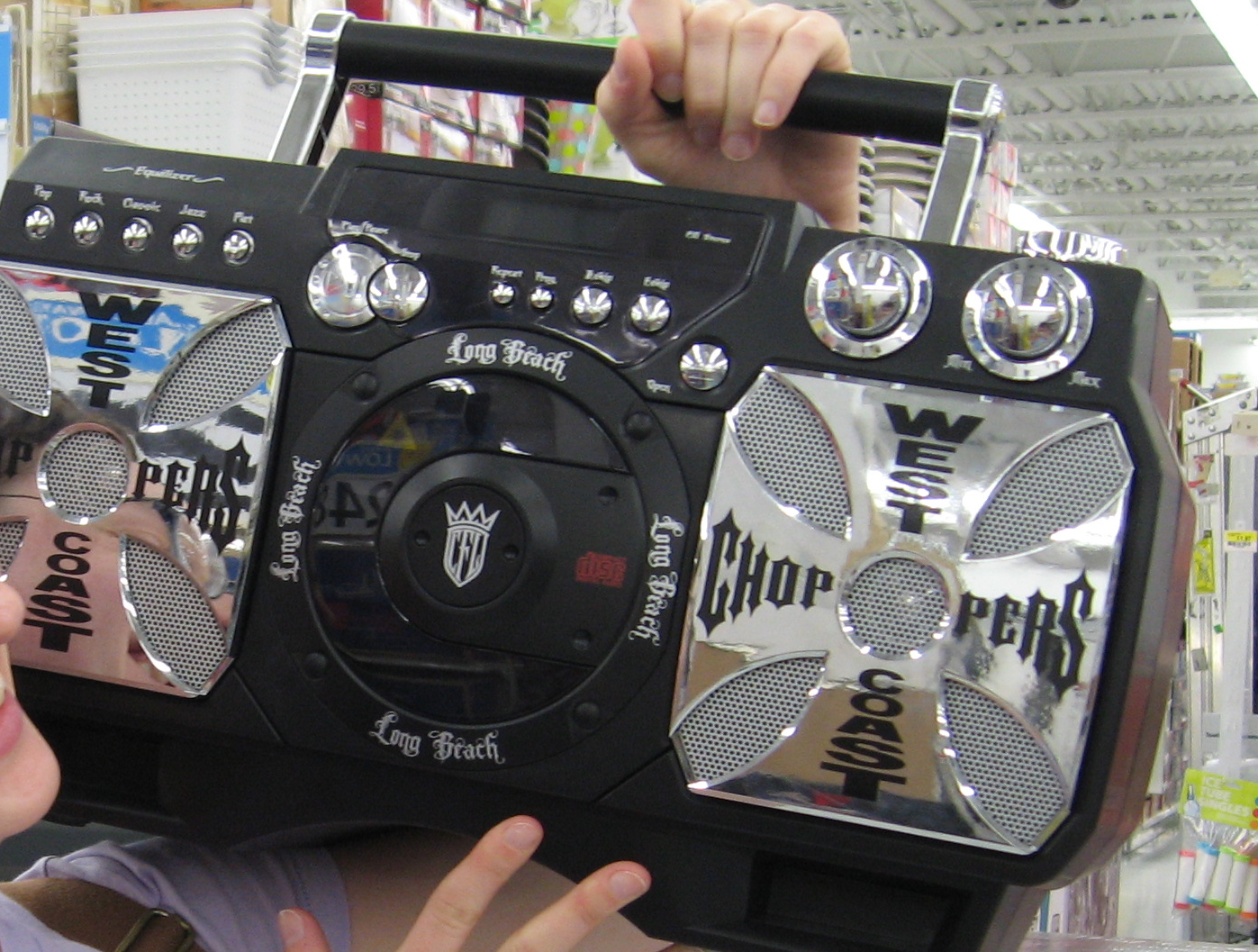
West Coast Choppers tie-in boombox

James sometimes displays a little unveiled contempt for his customers, as when he explained to Popular Mechanics how they conceived their US$3,000 kit for a chopper frame by saying, "We geared this towards the do-it-yourself mother—." Or when he joked with the Los Angeles Times at the high prices of his branded clothing, saying, "Wife beaters for $200 bucks, I'm like—sucker. I could get three for 10 bucks" at a swap meet.

This image is used mainly to sell clothing, the top moneymaker for the company. Sales in Europe are ten times the US, according to James. At one time, there were five clothing lines, including two sold by West Coast Choppers, two at Wal-Mart, as well as high-end lines available in more expensive department stores, such as T-shirts for "$100 a pop in Nordstrom, Bloomingdale's, and Fred Segal". Koral Industries of Vernon, California is responsible for the design and manufacture of WCC clothing, as well as supplying the sales force to place the products in stores. Clothing items include hoodies, tank tops, T-shirts and jackets. There is also a line of Jesse James/WCC-branded bib overalls and other workwear.

Besides clothing, and the small scale production of choppers made to order, tie-ins with other companies were a major part of West Coast Choppers. One such tie-in was a 2004 contest to win a motorcycle, with entries contained in bottles of chocolate Yoo-hoo, which helped to promote the launch of a new flavor, Dyna-Mocha, which is Yoo-hoo and coffee. West Coast Choppers also signed a multi-year agreement with Huffy in which West Coast Choppers will design Huffy choppers, to be sold at Wal-Mart. The objective was to duplicate success of Pacific Cycles' Schwinn Sting-Ray model designed by rival Orange County Choppers (OCC). While the OCC and WCC branded bikes had some success, the kids' bikes' sales at Wal-Mart and K-Mart was a fraction of bikes branded with children's characters such as Barbie, Disney Princess, Dora the Explorer, Power Rangers and Spider-Man.

Other brand tie-ins are a plasma arc cutter and other welding torches made by ESAB, designed by and named after Jesse James. Airstream trailers had a deal as well, which included a WCC motorcycle with a sidecar made with a polished aluminum body to simulate the appearance of the iconic camper trailers. Besides Yoo-hoo, another beverage company, Coors Brewing Company, added West Coast Choppers logos and pictures of bikes to their product in a mutually beneficial brand tie-in.

== Trademark style ==
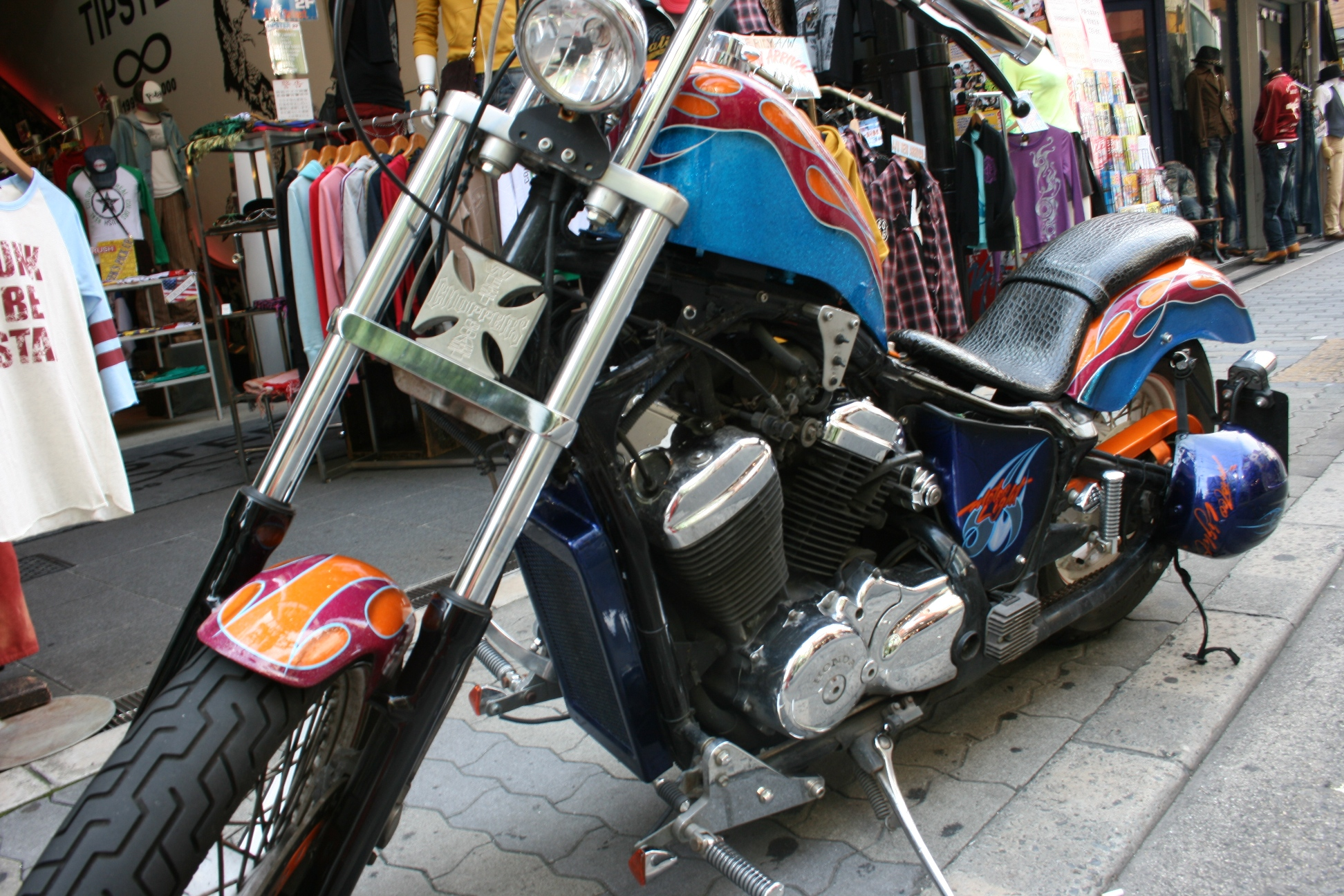
A chopper in Japan with a West Coast Choppers accessory cross.

West Coast Choppers motorcycles are described as old school and minimalist. WCC bikes have been called more stripped down when contrasted with decades-long established chopper builders like Arlen Ness, that is, a bike with, "not much there but engine, what the law requires, and something to hold onto." In spite of this characterization, a WCC trademark is the use of 9×19mm and .44 Magnum shell casings as purely non-functional decorations, adorning the fuel or oil filler caps or top of the motorcycle's handlebar risers, or elsewhere. The presence of this 20th-century gun ammunition is intended to evoke Jesse James' distant ancestor, old west outlaw and gunfighter Jesse James. A strong metaphorical tie between the chopper-riding biker and old west outlaws is a mainstay of biker culture, established by "the biker world's Norman Rockwell," painter David Mann. The biker's cross logo, a version of the Iron Cross or the Maltese Cross, is also typical of a WCC bike, though that symbol is nearly ubiquitous in Kustom Kulture regardless.

The old school label of WCC bike designs fits loosely as well, especially in recent years as WCC has moved away from the traditional Harley-Davidson chopper, seen by James as too mainstream, and stretched the style in search of originality. Specific influences include Lambretta scooters, Honda 305 Scramblers, and Schwinn Black Phantom bicycles.

Logo and insignia designs used by West Coast Choppers have been farmed to professional design firm Akins Parker Creative, who carefully researched the colors and motifs related to "old school bikers," such as Vietnam war squadron patches. This is crafted to reproduce for mass consumption the "odd, imperfect shapes" of old hand-painted bike art in order to gratify the customer's "keen sense of authenticity." as stated by the company.
