= Jesse James (television personality) =

American entrepreneur, automotive mechanic and television personality (born 1969)

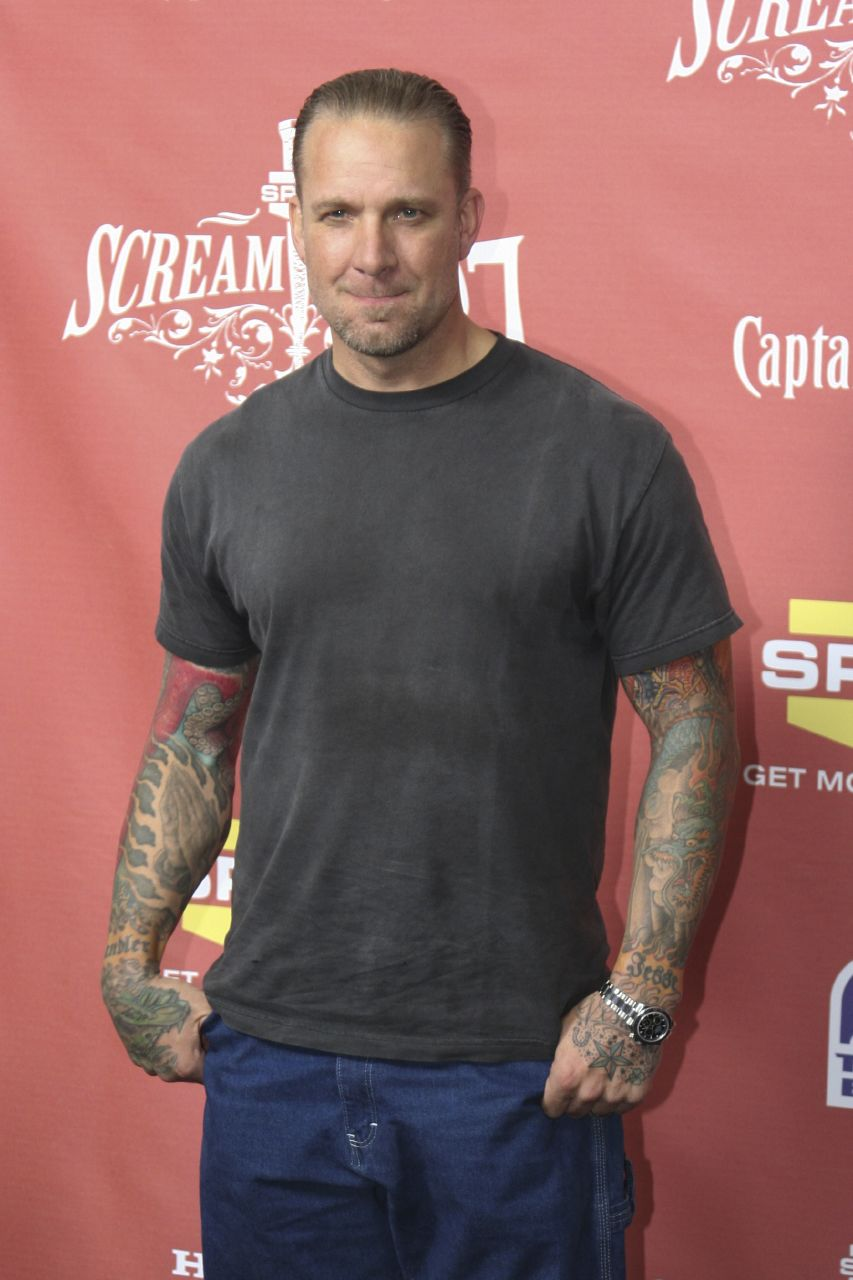
- James at the 2007 Scream Awards
- Born: Jesse Gregory James; April 19, 1969 (age 57); Long Beach, California, U.S.
- Occupations: Entrepreneur, television personality
- Years active: 1992–present
- Spouses: Karla James (m. 1991; div. 2002) Janine Lindemulder (m. 2002; div. 2004) Sandra Bullock (m. 2005; div. 2010) Alexis DeJoria (m. 2013; div. 2022) Bonnie Rotten (m. 2022)
- Children: 4

Jesse Gregory James (born April 19, 1969, Long Beach, California) is an American entrepreneur, automotive mechanic, and television personality. He is the founder of West Coast Choppers, ex-partner of Austin Speed Shop, and CEO of Jesse James Firearms Unlimited, also based in Austin, Texas.

James rose to fame as the host of the reality TV shows Monster Garage on the Discovery Channel and Jesse James Is a Dead Man on Spike TV. He also appeared in the 2004 skateboarding video game Tony Hawk's Underground 2.

== Career ==
Born in Long Beach California in 1969 James played as an outside linebacker at Riverside City College in Riverside, but two injuries forced him to end his playing career.

At age 19, he became a bouncer and then a bodyguard, notably for Slayer, Glenn Danzig, and Soundgarden.

In 1992, James founded West Coast Choppers in his mother's garage. In addition to his work with the company, he has built and is actively racing both an off-road Trophy Truck and a Figure-8 race car.

James was the owner of the Cisco Burger restaurant, which opened on April 28, 2006, across the street from West Coast Choppers which has officially closed. James also had partial ownership in Austin Speed Shop in Austin, Texas, which he left in 2013 to focus on the re-opening of West Coast Choppers in Austin.

Other business ventures include the fan club Chopperdogs and Jesse's Girl clothing line. James published the now-defunct custom-car magazine Garage.

In November 2013, Jesse James Firearms Unlimited unveiled its first two firearms, a 1911 pistol and an AR-15 rifle. His first rifle-caliber suppressor was a basic reworking of an original Maxim design that he claimed could impossibly bend the laws of physics by offering a 78 dB rating at the muzzle, lower than even what the De Lisle carbine achieved in testing; although James was careful to note that it only achieved that number with subsonic ammunition that does not produce a sonic boom.

As of 2020, James lives in Austin, Texas, operates Jesse James Fire Arms Unlimited, and manages the intellectual properties of West Coast Choppers.

== Television ==
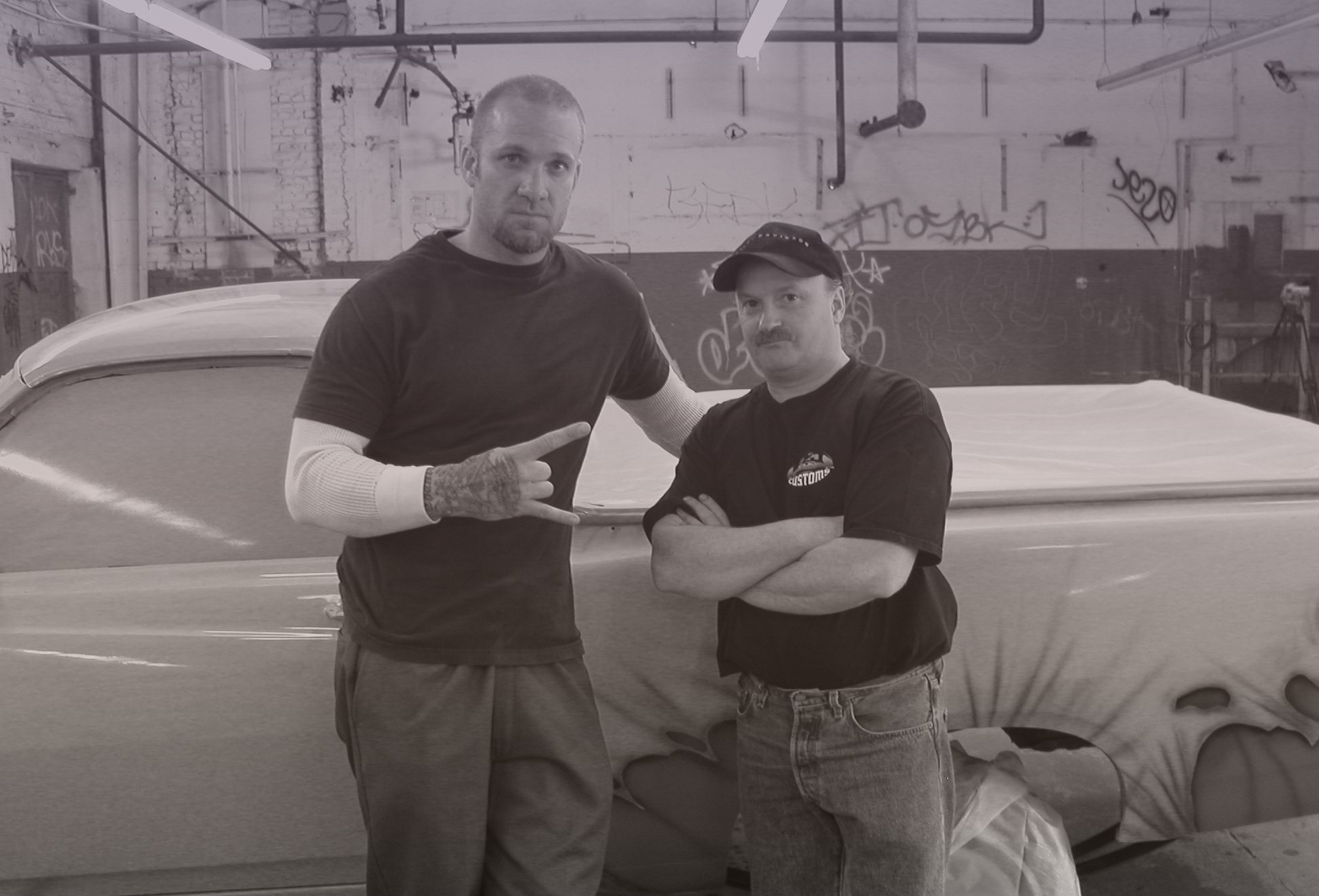
James (left) on the set of Monster Garage, 2003

In 2000, the Discovery Channel made the documentary Motorcycle Mania, which chronicled James' everyday life. Following the success of the documentary, the Discovery Channel approached James with an offer to host a new show called Monster Garage where James and a crew of mechanics modified vehicles under a short deadline. James later established Payupsucker Productions, under which he produced shows like History of the Chopper, Iraq Confidential with Jesse James and Green Scream, in which James plans to break the land speed record with an eco-friendly hydrogen car.

Through James' show "History of the Chopper" there are also glimpses of his involvement with the Hells Angels.

He also made an appearance on the Discovery Channel's Sons of Guns. He appeared on the second season of Celebrity Apprentice. Each celebrity played to raise money for a favorite charity; James selected to play for the Long Beach Education Foundation. Due to his poor performance in raising funds, James was eliminated by Donald Trump on the second-to-last show (ultimately placing third) which aired May 3, 2009. Trump repeatedly cited James' stoic refusal to contact then-wife Sandra Bullock to raise funds for the show's challenges, though other celebrities had no problem tapping high-rolling contacts for cash.

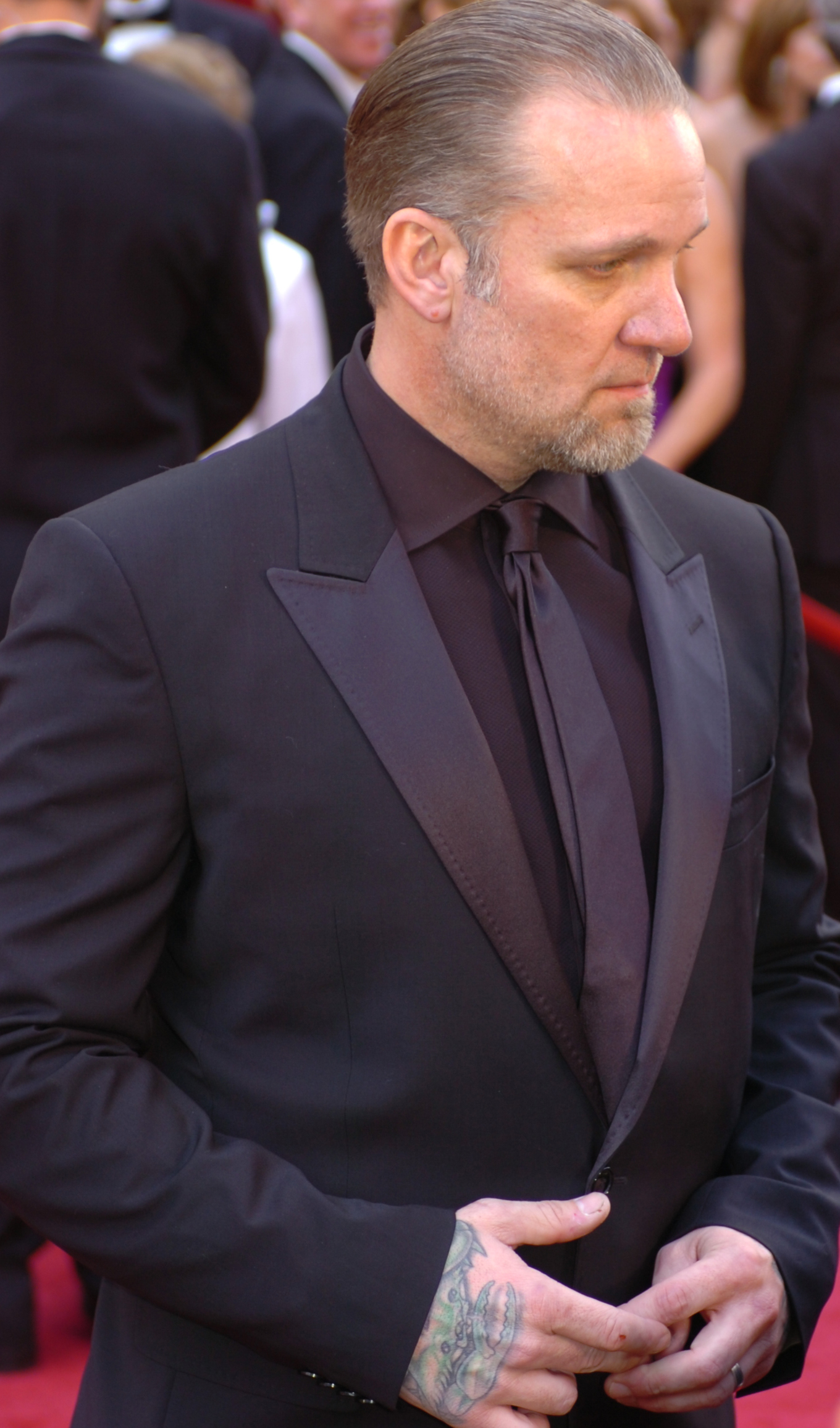
James at the 2010 Academy Awards

His show Jesse James Is a Dead Man premiered on Spike TV on May 31, 2009. The show features James doing death-defying stunts. The first episode set a rating record for Spike, drawing the largest audience ever for an unscripted series on the network, with 2 million viewers. The show is produced by Spike TV, BASE Productions and James' company, PayupSucker Productions. In conjunction with that appearance Marvel Comics created a special one-shot comic book where he evades death once again after considering retirement, and made it available in comic book stores for free distribution.

James appeared on an episode of Street Customs where he had his pickup truck customized by West Coast Customs.

He appeared in an advertisement for T-Mobile's Google mobile phone with Whoopi Goldberg and Phil Jackson. Jesse James appeared on Sons of Guns on March 28, 2012. He asked the Red Jacket Firearms team to build a customized Browning Automatic Rifle for him and even assisted in the build himself.

Jesse appeared in special "Biker Build-Off" episodes of American Chopper in 2011 and 2012 for bike build-off competitions with Paul Teutul Jr. (representing Paul Jr. Designs) and Paul Teutul Sr. (representing Orange County Choppers), with Gas Monkey Garage (featured on the Discovery series Fast N' Loud) entering the competition in 2012.

== Personal life ==
=== Family and relationships ===
James' Discovery Channel website states that his great-great-grandfather was the eponymous notorious outlaw's cousin. However, Eric James, president of the James Preservation Trust, which tracks claims of being a relative of the outlaw, says it cannot find a record of him in the family tree and has asked him to provide a family genealogy and DNA sample for the trust to review; he has not provided the requested information.

James has four children: a daughter and a son with his first wife, Karla James, to whom he was married from 1991 to 2002; a daughter with his second wife, stripper/adult actress Janine Lindemulder, to whom he was married from 2002 to 2004; and a son with his fifth wife, former porn actress and model Bonnie Rotten, whom he married in 2022.

On July 16, 2005, James married his third wife, actress Sandra Bullock. They met when she arranged for her ten-year-old godson, a fan, to tour the set of Monster Garage.

In October 2009, James' ex-wife Lindemulder, who had been in federal prison for six months for tax evasion, sought to regain custody of her then five-year-old daughter with James, after James had been granted sole guardianship of her. James sought to retain full guardianship, citing fear of the environment in which his daughter would be placed if returned to Lindemulder. In December, James won custody, and Lindemulder was given weekly visitation rights during the daytime.

In March 2010, a media scandal arose when several women claimed to have had affairs with James during his marriage to Bullock. Bullock canceled European promotional appearances for The Blind Side citing "unforeseen personal reasons." On March 18, 2010, James responded to the rumors of infidelity by issuing a public apology to Bullock. James declared that "There is only one person to blame for this whole situation, and that is me," and asked that his wife and children one day "find it in their hearts to forgive me" for their current "pain and embarrassment." James' publicist subsequently announced on March 30, 2010, that James had checked into a rehab facility "to deal with personal issues" and "save his marriage" to Bullock. However, on April 28, 2010, it was reported that Bullock had filed for divorce on April 23 in Austin, Texas. Bullock also stated that she had planned to adopt a baby boy born in New Orleans. Bullock and James had begun an initial adoption process four years earlier. The child began living with them in January 2010, but they kept the news private until after the Oscars in March 2010. However, given the couple's separation and then divorce, Bullock continued the adoption of the baby as a single parent. The divorce was finalized on June 28, 2010, with "conflict of personalities" cited as the reason.

In August 2010, tattoo artist Kat Von D confirmed reports that she and James were dating. James and Von D became engaged in January 2011. Von D announced that they had split in July 2011. However, in August 2011, James and Von D announced their engagement was back on. In September 2011, Von D announced that she and James had broken up again. Von D later accused James of cheating on her with multiple women during their relationship.

In late 2012, James became engaged to professional drag racer Alexis DeJoria. They married on March 24, 2013, at the estate of the bride's father, entrepreneur John Paul DeJoria. In March 2020, James announced his separation from DeJoria after seven years of marriage, stating, "Our lives were just headed in different directions."

Since late 2021, James has been in a relationship with former porn film star Bonnie Rotten. They married on June 25, 2022, and welcomed a son exactly one year later. It was reported on November 22, 2024, that Bonnie Rotten had filed for divorce. Both of them filed for restraining orders against each other citing abuse. The couple later reconciled and on January 6, 2025, they jointly filed a "notice of nonsuit" to dismiss their divorce proceedings. In March 2026, Rotten was arrested for assaulting James, though each denied reports that they were currently estranged, with James later publicly referring to Rotten as "my kind of devil."

=== Legal troubles ===
In 2007, James was fined $271,250 by the California Air Resources Board (CARB) after state officials determined that he had sold motorcycles violating California's clean-air laws. According to authorities, James' customized bikes were emitting 11 times the legal limits of hydrocarbons. Investigators also found that the motorcycles did not have state-certified emissions equipment on their fuel tanks. The bikes were sold between 1997 and 2006. James explained that he was unaware of rule changes that required small-volume manufacturers to comply with regulations. James said the CARB refused his offer to recall and modify the uncompliant choppers. Since 2005, West Coast Choppers has built emissions-compliant choppers. James said the fines were excessive and intended to make an example of him due to his company's fame and his celebrity marriage to actress Sandra Bullock, but CARB spokesmen stated their enforcement efforts were aimed at the entire custom industry and further that they were aware of no offer by West Coast Choppers to recall the motorcycles in question.

In July 2008, James faced a $422,680 breach of contract lawsuit from Michael Jones, a customer who hired James to build him a custom car, who contended that after paying $270,000 over two years, the car was not completed and that James informed him that it would cost between $600,000 and $700,000. That September, James faced another lawsuit from his former lawyer for $327,533 in unpaid fees.

In 2010, James was accused by Fortune Fashions Industries, LLC of working with Walmart and stealing one of Fortune Fashions Industries' executives to work on the clothing line after a failed collaboration between Jesse and Fortune Fashions. The company claimed over 6 million dollars in damage, and lawyer Lawrence H. Nagler, representing the LLC, claimed "Jesse has stolen the benefit of Fortune Fashions' work and manpower to put this together." James' lawyer Joseph A. Yanny pointed out that James was a prolific entrepreneur, selling his West Coast Choppers brand apparel in his shop and online, long before he met Fred Kayne (owner of Fortune Fashions). The trial concluded with a verdict in favor of James. When Fortune Fashion Industries asked the judge to quash the jury decision, the judge stated they were "not entitled to any proceeds from an unrelated line of clothing that came into being a year after the failed venture."

=== Controversial photos ===
After James entered rehab after giving a Nazi salute and wearing a Nazi-era cap, he explained to the ABC News show Nightline that the photo, taken in 2004 before his marriage to Bullock, was meant as a joke, and that he was not a racist. James' lawyer claimed that the hat was a gift from a Jewish mentor and that James is not a neo-Nazi. Us subsequently printed additional photos that had been posted to Facebook by former West Coast Choppers employees showing James and Nazi imagery. A friend of James explained to the magazine that the "swastika deal" is "part of biker culture".
