= Shinya Kimura =

Japanese born custom motorcycle builder

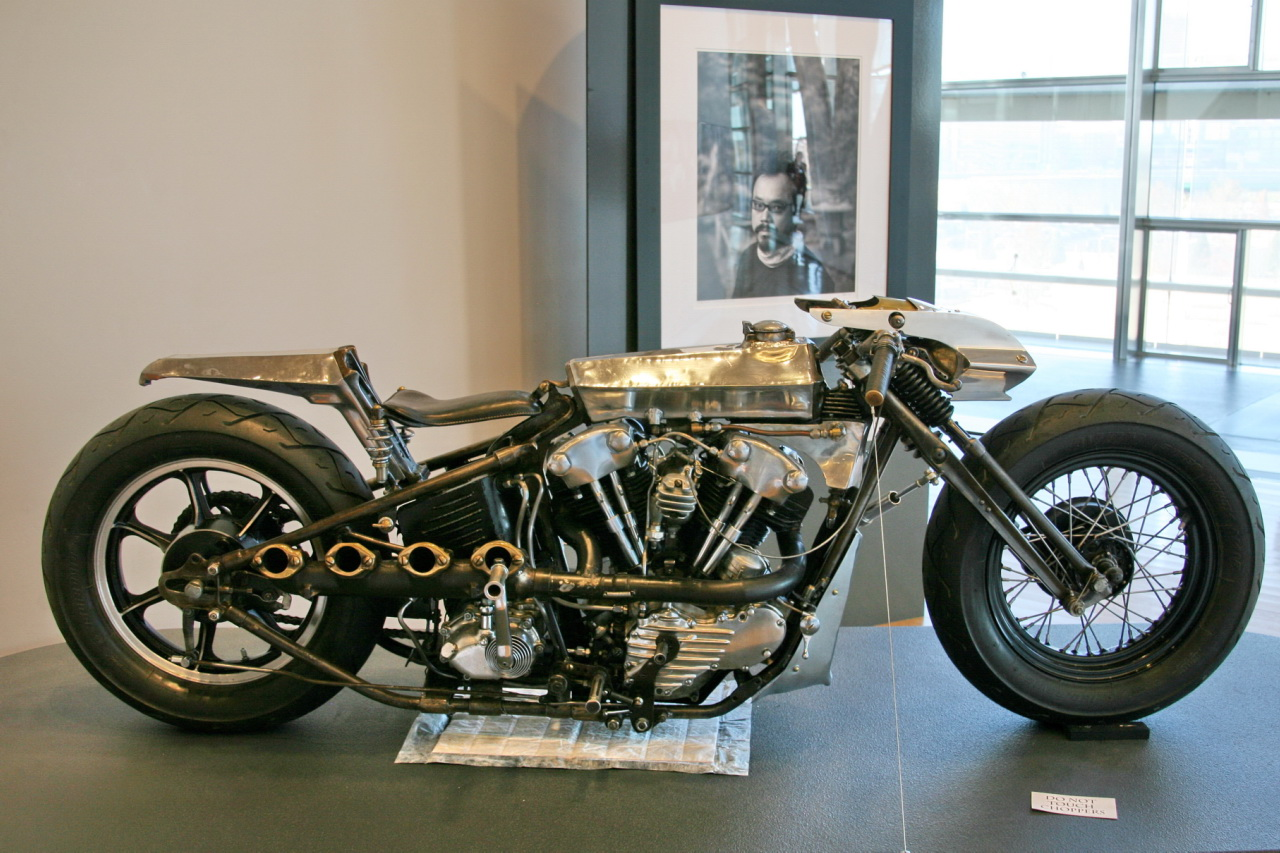
- Spike, a Shinya Kimura custom motorcycle
- Born: Shinya Kimura
- Occupations: Motorcycle builder Motorcycle mechanic Sculptor
- Years active: Since 1992

Shinya Kimura is a Japanese born custom motorcycle builder. He founded Zero Engineering in 1992 and Chabott Engineering in 2002. He is the originator of the "zero style" custom bike.

== Biography ==
=== Zero Engineering ===
Kimura founded Zero Engineering in Okazaki Japan in 1992. Initially his shop was named Repair Shop Chabo but the name was changed the following year to Zero Engineering. He soon gained a reputation for his minimalistic and vintage looking bikes that combine form and function. His name was soon synonymous with what people often refer to as Zero-style. A Zero-style bike is typically based around a rigid "gooseneck" frame, a pre-1984 Harley Davidson engine, springer front end, spoked wheels and often includes parts of the bike remaining in bare metal. The inspiration came from wabi sabi (austere refinement) and the beauty of the raw materials and incorporating the essence of wa (harmony) into his designs. Kimura and his crew were also known for putting their work to the test by participating in different vintage race series with their motorcycles.

In 2002 Kimura expanded his business by opening an office in Las Vegas, Nevada, where he in 2005 built his entry the Biker Build-Off against Joe Martin from the Martin Brothers. Other bikes were built in 10 days in front of a film crew, the riders then met up in Las Vegas and rode to Palm Springs, California where a popular vote was held which Joe Martin won.

Kimura left Zero Engineering to launch his own studio named Chabott Engineering. Meanwhile, Zero Engineering is still in Japan and Las Vegas and have to this date created more than 200 custom bikes, including the new line of production bikes built in their facility in Las Vegas. At this time their line includes models based on Harley Davidson's Shovelhead and Evolution engine with two models based on the Sportster being released in the future. Recently two of the company's bikes were used in the 2008 film Iron Man.

=== Chabott Engineering ===
In 2006 Kimura set up his own shop named Chabott Engineering in Azusa, California to build both custom bikes as well as moving himself toward the world of art.

Kimura said, "Since setting up in America, I've moved from being just a custom-bike builder to slightly changing my direction a little more toward the world of art. I don't know whether success or failure is awaiting me in the future. Can custom bikes become art? Maybe we'll know in 10 years' time."

Along with fellow bike builders Jesse James, Ian Barry and Billy Lane, Kimura was among the first custom bike builders to receive an invitation to the Legend of the Motorcycle - Concours d'Elegance exhibition.

In 2010, Kimura and Chabott Engineering were the subject of a documentary short by film maker Henrik Hansen, which was one of five documentaries to be nominated for a 2010 Vimeo documentary award.

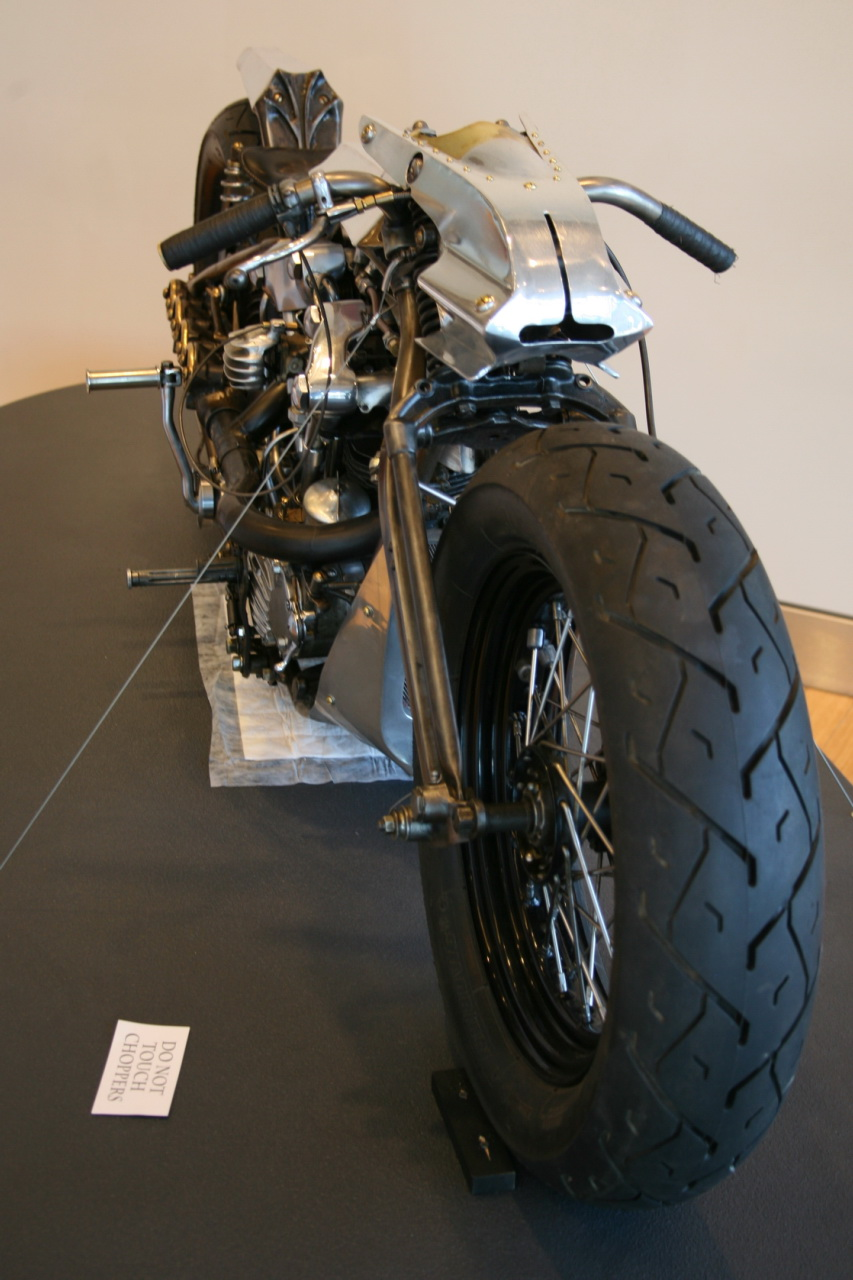
Spike

== Awards ==
- Third place at Easy-Rider Show in Pomona, California 2004
- Best of Show at the L.A. Calendar Show 2004
