= Metal Militia =

Metal Militia may refer to:

- Metal Militia (band)
- "Metal Militia", song by Metallica on the album Kill 'Em All
- "Metal Militia", (Robot Chicken episode), an episode of the TV series Robot Chicken
- Metal Mulisha, a clothing brand
