= Ritz-Carlton Half Moon Bay =

Luxury hotel in Half Moon Bay

Coordinates: 37°26′2″N 122°26′30″W

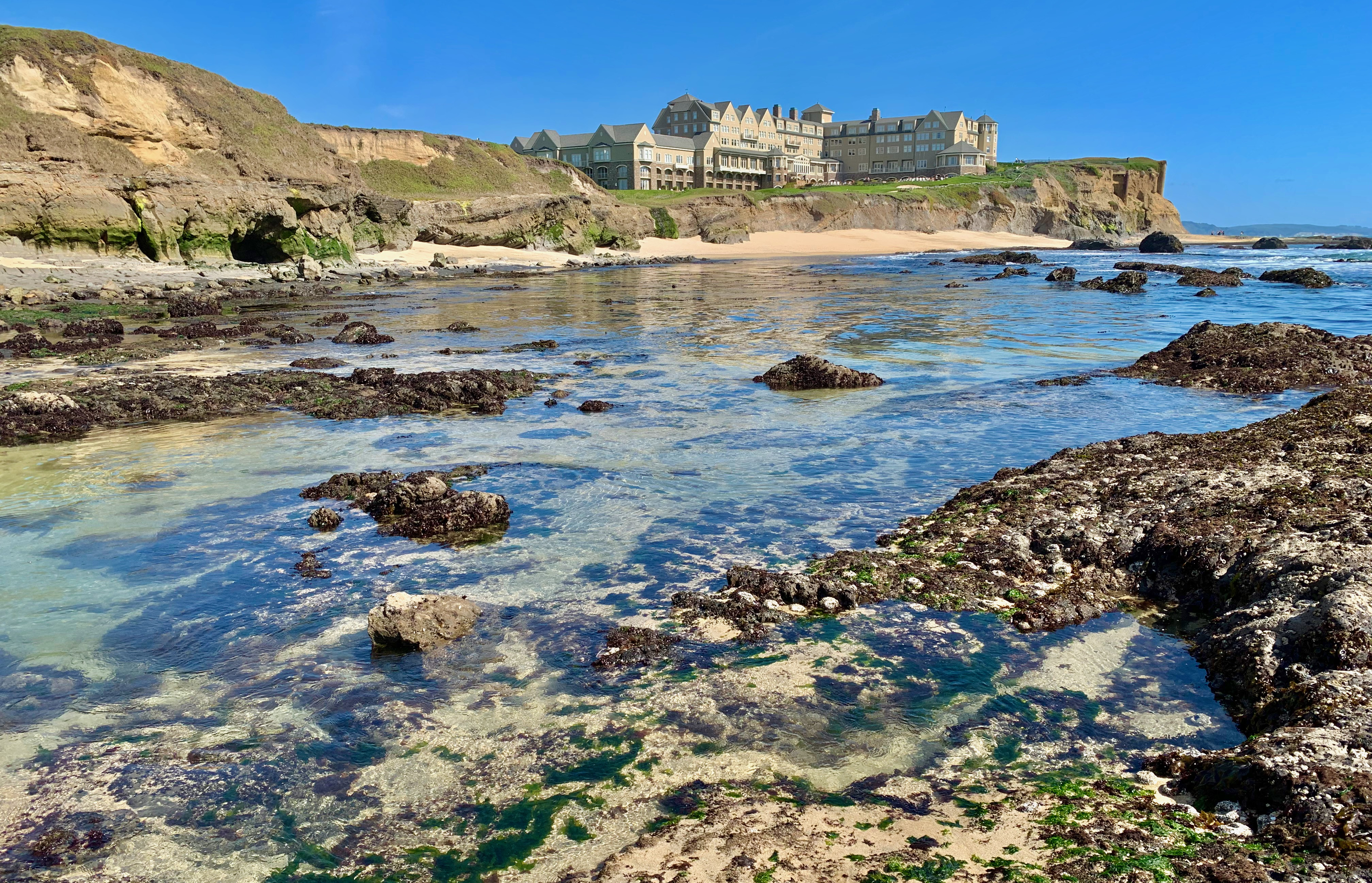
The Ritz Carlton from the beach access to the north of the hotel. The bluff in which the hotel is located was found to be vulnerable to sea level rise in a 2022 study by the local county.

The Ritz-Carlton Half Moon Bay is a luxury hotel and golf resort in Half Moon Bay in California, United States. The hotel is a Forbes Five Star hotel, and was featured on the travel channel series Great Hotels. The hotel has 261 rooms, that in 2019, started at US$920 a night. The hotel began construction in 1998, and finished in 2001.

The hotel is the biggest employer for the town of Half Moon Bay, California, with approximately 550 jobs. The hotel was purchased by Anbang Insurance Group in 2015, and after its bankruptcy has had repeated offers from other buyers, but as of September 2021 there were no buyers.

The hotel sits on a point in the bay, that allows for views along a long section of the coast. Parts of the hotel services are themed around the Scottish Highlands. One of the two golf courses was designed by Arnold Palmer. The hotel services also include a 16,000 square feet (1,500 m^{2}) spa and three tennis courts.

On November 6, 2026, it was reported that the University of California’s investment arm purchased the property, most likely to be used as an investment.

== Issues ==
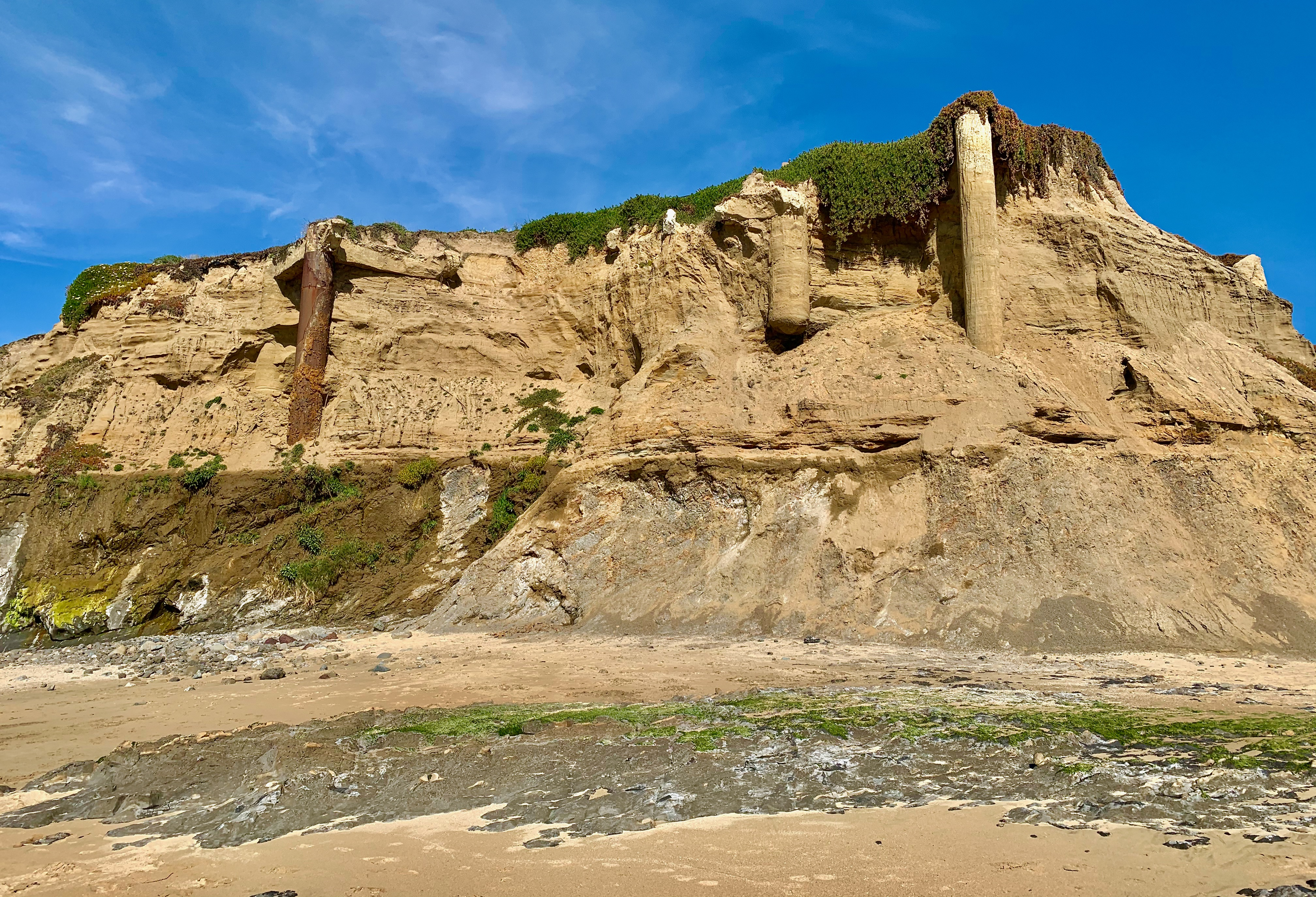
Remnants of a foundation laid in the early construction of the hotel that was later revised out of the plans. Since then the foundations have been exposed by coastal erosion.

The hotel contributes most of the tourism income for the local Half Moon Bay, California government, including both transient resident and property taxes. A 2022 study published by the local government also found that the hotel and its infrastructure were vulnerable to sea level rise. A February 2017 storm eroded significant sections of the bluff, which the builders had previously intended to be included in the building.

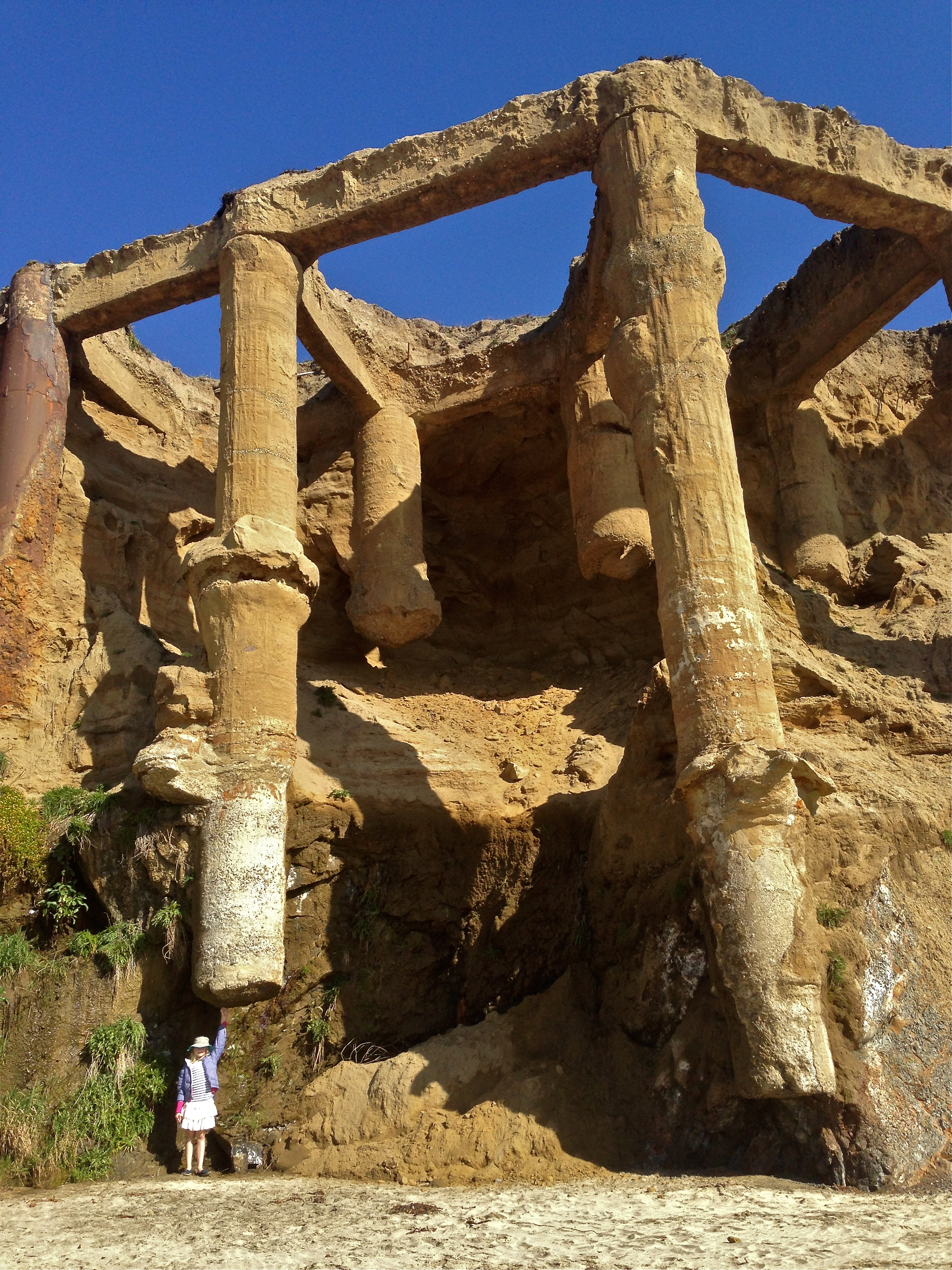
Exposed foundations in the Sandstone Cliffs from a 2014 erosion event

In 2019, the hotel was fined 1.6 million dollars by the California Coastal Commission for impeding beach access for non-guests. Some of the money from the fine was given to local conservation group Peninsula Open Space Trust.

== Legend of the Motorcycle ==
Legend of the Motorcycle International Concours d’Elegance
- Status: Inactive
- Genre: Concours d'Elegance, motorcycle show and auction
- Frequency: Annually
- Location: Half Moon Bay, California
- Country: United States
- Years active: 2006–2008
- Attendance: c. 3,000
- Website: legendofthemotorcycle.com

The Legend of the Motorcycle International Concours d’Elegance was an international motorcycle exhibition held at the hotel, for 3 years from 2006-2008. It was the first motorcycle Concours d'Dlegance held in the United States with a team of judges and exhibited motorcycles brought in from around the world, and was notable for several first-ever or largest-ever displays of Brough Superiors, Crockers, Excelsior-Hendersons, etc. The event was organized by husband and wife team Jared Zaugg and Brooke Roner of San Francisco, with major corporate sponsorship by Kiehl's and Men's Vogue.

The three-day-event included art and ephemera exhibitions inside the Ritz-Carlton hotel itself, a Friday evening reception dinner, the Saturday Concours d'Elegance and prize-giving ceremony, and a Sunday 'Legends Ride', a 44-mile (72 km) scenic loop over the mountain ridge-top that overlooks the Pacific Ocean and included Highway 1 and Skyline Boulevard. The inclusion of a ride with the Concours d'Elegance reinforced the requirement that any motorcycle winning an award at the LOTM Concours must be in running condition (with specific exceptions, such as Land Speed Racers and Grand Prix racers); motorcycles that could not be started and ridden over the awards podium forfeited their prize.

This atypical concours d’elegance was established to create a competitive event for motorcycles that previously had been associated with fine automobiles. The Concours exhibited up to two hundred motorcycles on the lawn of the Ritz-Carlton golf course, and represented motorcycle history from its origins in 1869 (with a replica of Sylvester Roper's steamer present), to the present, with factory prototypes and custom motorcycles. Each year a different motorcycle factory was specially featured, including Vincent, Excelsior-Henderson, and Crocker.

Custom motorcycles were included for the first time in a major Concours d'Elegance, recognizing the impact of these hand-made works of art on the motorcycle industry as a whole. The builders featured included the Japanese master Shinya Kimura, and the noted bike builder, stuntman, and innovator, Indian Larry, and TV celebrity motorcycle customizer Jesse James, founder of the West Coast Choppers, who showed his Radial Hell aero bike, which is powered by a 7-cylinder Rotec radial aircraft engine. West Coast Choppers unveiled their Airstream Bike at the Legend show, which cost over $300,000 and was made for Airstream CEO, Bob Wheeler. Ian Barry at Falcon Motorcycles also unveiled The Bullet Falcon, at the 2008 concours. It was custom-created for the skateboarder and actor Jason Lee, and won "Best Custom" at the show.

On average, 6,000 visitors attended the event, including iconic motorcycle riders such as Peter Fonda, Chad McQueen, Ewan McGregor, and the famed stuntman and racer Bud Ekins.

== In popular culture ==
The hotel was a filming location for the 2003 movie American Wedding.
