= Roland Sands =

American motorcycle racer and designer

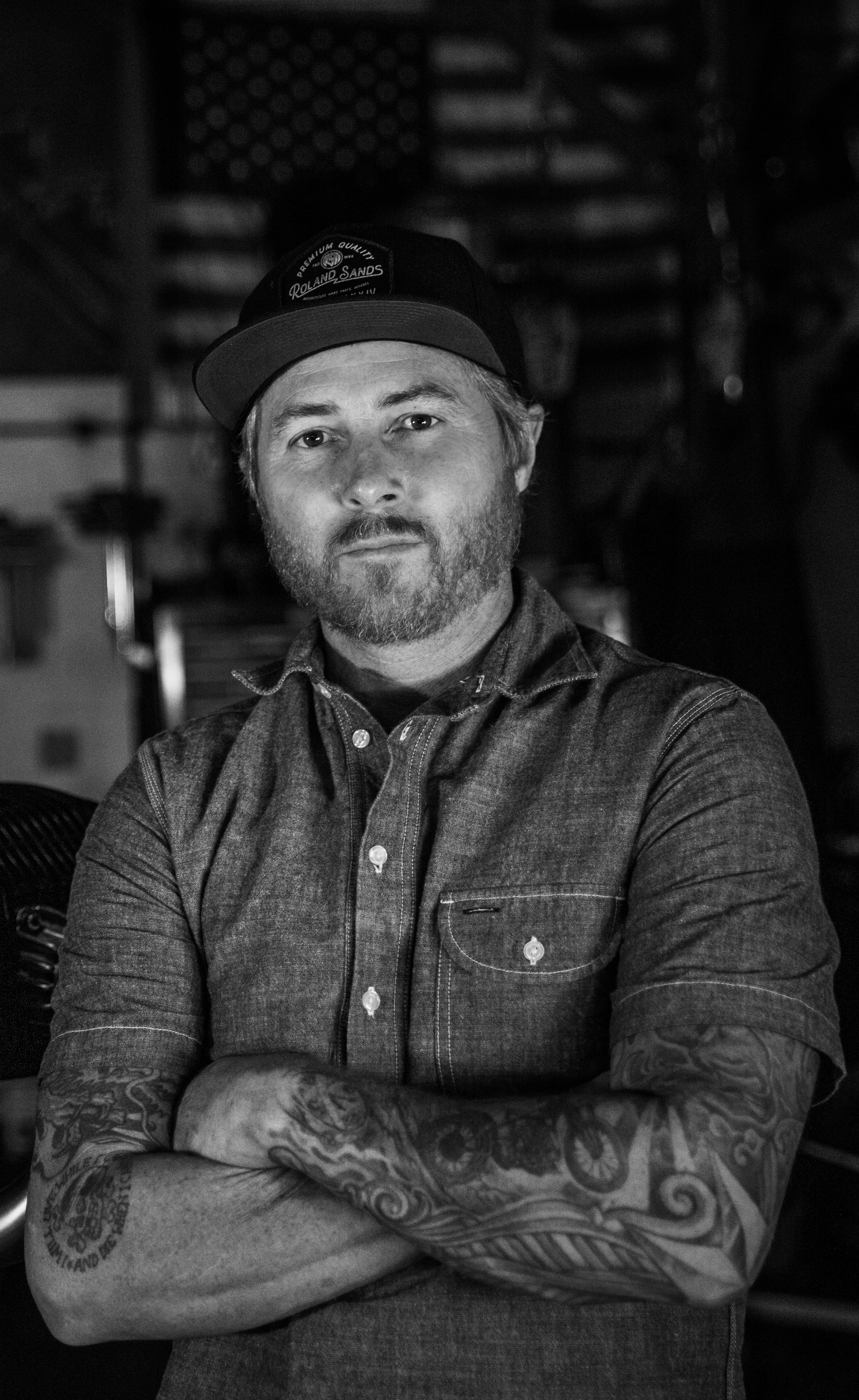

Roland Sands (born August 12, 1974) is an American motorcycle racer and designer of custom motorcycles. In his career as a professional motorcycle racer, he won the 1998 AMA 250GP National Champion road racer championship. Sands is also the owner and founder of Roland Sands Design.

== Background ==
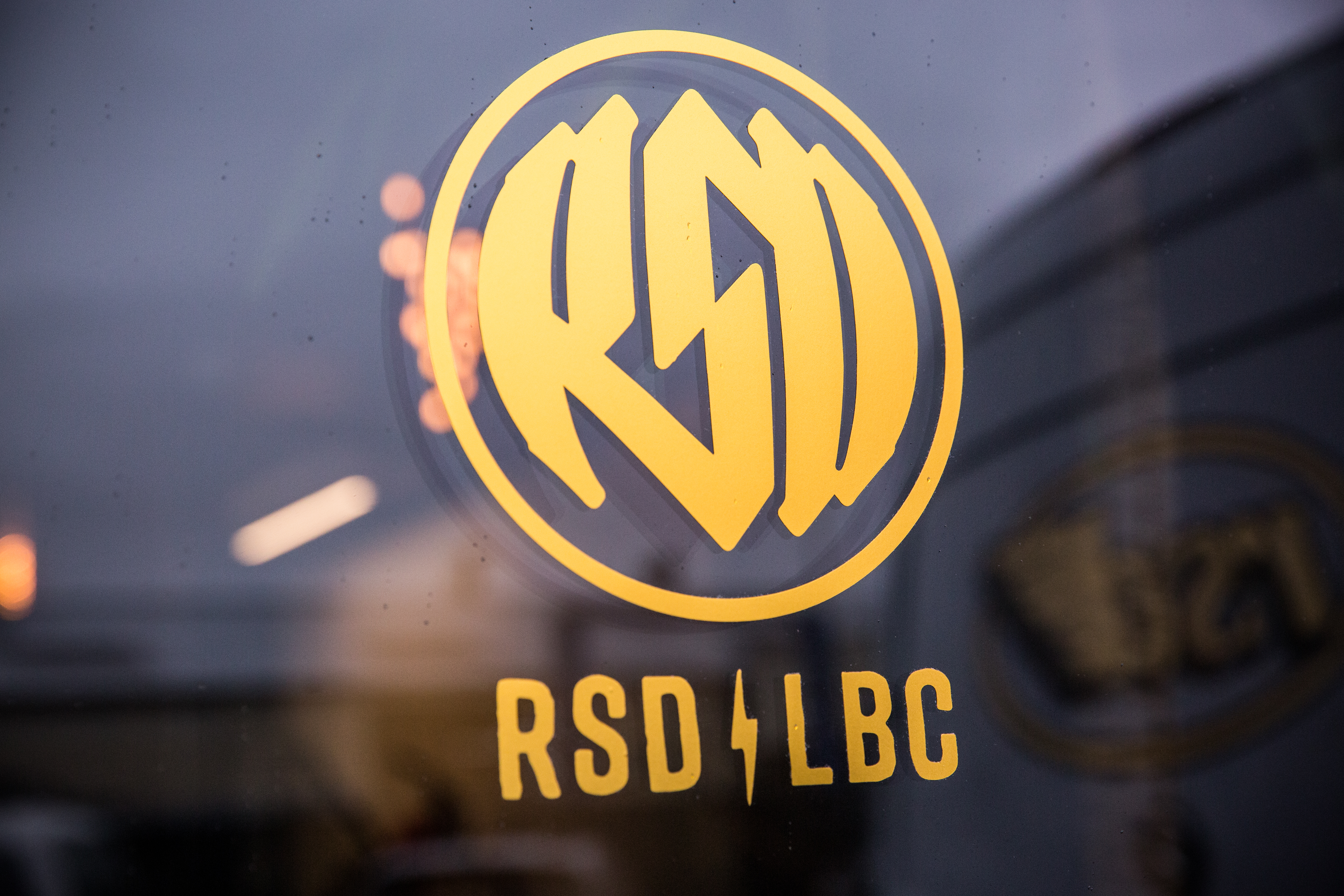
1365 Obispo Ave, Long Beach CA 90804

Sands is from Long Beach, California.

== Pro racing career ==
During Sands' professional racing career, from 1994 to 2002, Sands gained 10 wins.

At the age of 19, Sands' father sent him to Keith Code's California Superbike School.

Sands won his first novice 250GP race at Willow Springs Raceway in California, Sands had a nine-year professional racing career at the top of the AMA 250GP ranks, including a national championship in 1998.

In 2000, Sands did a stint in the British Super Cup series on a factory Honda.

Sands currently holds four track records, including Daytona, Sears Point, and Mazda Raceway Laguna Seca.

In 2004, designer Chip Foose awarded Sands with the Award of Design Excellence for his design on the motorcycle 'The Hard Way'.

In 2005, Sands was voted Rookie of the Year on the Discovery Channel Biker Build-Off award show.

Since his first television appearance on Biker Build-Off, Sands has been featured on ESPN2's Chopper Nation and Super Bikes, Speed Channel's American Thunder and Build or Bust, and crowned champion of Biker Build-Off in 2006 against Jesse Rooke.

== Awards and accomplishments ==
- AMA 250 GP Champion 1998
- V-Twin Wheel Design of the Year 2002
- V-Twin Control Design of the Year 2004
- V-Twin Wheel Design of the Year 2004
- Chip Foose Design of Excellence Award, Sturgis, 2004
- Modified Harley Class at the World Championship of Custom Bike Building 2nd, 3rd, and 4th place in 2005
- V-Twin Award Trendsetter of the Year, Daytona, 2005
- Discovery Channel's Ultimate Chop Biker Build-Off Season Finale and Awards Ceremony Rookie of the Year 2005
- V-Twin Award Trendsetter of the year, Daytona, 2005
- Discovery Channel's Biker Build-Off Champion for Sands vs. Rooke episode 1, 2006

== Press and publicity ==
=== Covers ===
- Xtreme Bikes (Spain), Issue No. 20
- Xtreme Bikes (Spain), Issue No. 22
- Freeway Magazine (France), May 2005

Hardcore Chopper(Japan), November 2005

- Sport Bike (United States), 2006 Issue
- Wild Motorcycles (France), June 2006
- Barnett's (United States), September 2006
- Bike Works (United States), September 2006
- Xtreme Bike (Spain), Issue No. 22
- Superstreet Bikes (United States), October 2006
- Performance Bikes (UK), October 2006
- American Iron (United States), September 2011

=== Articles ===
- Hot Rod Bikes (United States) Feb. 2003: The Racer's Edge: Roland Sands Builds his First American Custom
- Freeway Magazine (France) Feb. 2003 Rolling with the Homies: V-Rod Motorcycle Performance Machine's Roland Sands Designs Whiskey Tang No. 10 Team PM Family Affair: Perry and Roland
- V-Twin Motorcycles (United States) Sept. 2003 Performance Machine Master Builder Triple Threat Talents
- Wild Motorcycles (France) April 2004 The Hard Way 70 : PM raises the bar with Roland's new V-ROD Like Father, Like Son: Perry and Roland Sands Interview
- Hot Bike 2005 Calendar January: The Hard Way 70
- Freeway Magazine (France) May 2005: Daytona Hard Rock El Grande Moco from Sands
- Orange County Register – Sept. 2005: Architect in Motion
- Barnett's (United States) Aug./Sept 2005 Laughlin River Run: El Grande Moco
- Harley Davidson's Dream Machine (Germany) Sept. 2005: Performance Machine's Roland Sands #35 V-Rod and Street Rod Specials
- Robb Report Motorcycling (United States) Nov./Dec. 2005 Green Machine: Roland Sands builds for both style and Substance the Grande Moco
- Xtreme Bikes (Spain) No. 20 Roland Sands' The Glory Stomper
- Playboy Magazine (United States) March 2006 On the Scene: Custom official Roland Sands is fueling next generation of custom motorcycles
- Biker Journalen (Norway) No. 3 2006 Roland Sands Biker Build-Off: The Glory Stomper
- McNytt (Denmark) May 2006 Back to Nature: RSD's the Grunt
- Cycle News (United States) Issue #19 May 17, 2006 Build or Bust: Roland Sands' No Regrets
- Wild Motorcycles (France) June 2006 Wild Wheels: RSD's Grunt
- Easyriders (United States) 35th Anniversary Special June 2006 Something Different from Roland Sands: The Art of Function, the Glory Stomper
- Motociclismo (Spain) Aug. 2006 El Grande Moco
- Cycle News (United States) August 9, 2006: Sands Gets His Hands on MotoGP Engine ... Watch Out!
- Freeway (France) Aug. 2006: The Roland Sands Story: Street Warrior Grunt, the RSD Grunt Roland Sands Performance Superboy The Glory Stomper El Burracho
- Sport Bike (United States) 2006 Issue: Roland Sands' New Blood United States's baby! Speed Dating: A United States and Bunny Tale
- MotorRad (Germany) August 18, 2006: Intro News: RSD KRV5 Tracker
- Wild Magazine (France) Sept. 2006: RSD's KRV5 Tracker RSD's No Regrets
- V-Twin News (United States) Sept. 2006: RSD Vintage Cover Line
- Performance Bike (Japan) Performance Machine PM's Roland Sands
- Bike Works (United States) Sept. 2006: Biker Build Off Race: Roland Sands vs. Jesse Rooke Roland Sands vs. Jesse Rooke at Willow Springs Raceway
- Barnett's (United States) Sept. 2006 Roland Sands Interview
- Super Street Bike (United States) Oct. 2006: Biker Build-Off Winner: Roland Sands New World Order
- Performance Bikes (UK) Oct. 2006: Roland Sands' Radical 2-litre Harley Racer U.S. Bike-building Genius Injects some West Coast attitude into Goodwood: No Regrets
- Hot Bike (United States) Vol. 38 No. 12 Oct. 24, 2006 Custom Looks, Reliability, and Good Manners: Roland Sands comes up another winner 'The Vintage Kit'
- Xtreme Bikes Magazine (Spain) Issue 20 Dec 2004 The Glory Stomper (Cover)
- Xtreme Bikes Magazine (Spain) Issue 22 Feb 2005 Grande Moco (Cover)

=== Television appearances ===
- Discovery Channel's Biker Build-Off : Chop Off finale September 4, 2006
- Discovery Channel's Biker Build-Off : two episodes, 2005
- ESPN2's SuperBikes : one episode, 2006
- ESPN2's Chopper Nation : two episodes, 2005
- Speed Channel's American Thunder : ten episodes, 2004, 2005, 2006
- Speed Channel's Build or Bust : three episodes, 2005
- MTV's Nitro Circus : One Episode, 2009
- Esquire Network's Wrench Against the Machine: Judge for Season 1 (Episodes 1 through 5 {5 of 5}) 2016, 2017

== Retail Expansion ==
July 2021 Roland Sands Design (RSD) moved their retail store to Long Beach, CA.

== Sources ==
- Hot Bike Magazine
- Motorcycle USA Magazine
- Bikernet.com
- Livingwithgravity.com

Roland Sands brings the high-quality motorcycle Johnny Jacket
