= Ian Barry =

Ian Barry may refer to:

- Ian Barry (motorcycle builder), founder of Falcon Motorcycles
- Ian Barry (director), Australian film and television director
