= Albert Crocker =

American inventor

Albert Crocker (1887–1961) was an American inventor and the founder of Crocker Motorcycles. His innovations had a substantial influence on the motorcycle and racing business.

== History ==
=== College and racing years ===
Crocker graduated from Armour Institute, part of [[Illinois Institute of Technology]], with an engineering degree. His first job out of college was with the Aurora Automatic Machine Company; he worked in the motorcycle division, engineering new products. Although he was an engineer, he loved motorcycles and racing, competing in and winning many endurance contests.

In late 1910, Crocker left Aurora, and was employed by Indian as a traveling salesman, covering "Kansas, Nebraska, and part of the adjacent states in the interests of Indian motorcycles."

=== Marriage and move to the West Coast ===
Crocker's personal life was deeply affected by the 1912 accident in which the famous board track motorcycle racer Eddie Hasha was severely injured in a race and died from his injuries shortly after. Crocker later met Hasha's widow, Gertrude Jefford Hasha, in 1912, while both were working at the Indian branch in Denver, Colorado. They were married in 1913 and had one son also named Albert.

In that same year, Crocker took over the Indian motorcycle dealership in Kansas City. The dealership functioned as a distributor for several Midwest states. Eventually, however Crocker moved to Los Angeles.

== Crocker motorcycles ==
In Los Angeles, Crocker moved into a former furniture store on 1346 Venice Blvd to sell and repair used motorcycles.

Al Crocker and Paul Bigsby in 1931 introduced a dirt track racing motorcycle.

Crocker invented the Crocker 30–50 cu in (490–820 cc) single-cylinder speedway bike. It became the bike of choice for many of the best riders on the Pacific coast when speedway racing was at its height. Crocker ultimately built about thirty speedway bikes.

He later sold his Indian dealership and moved on to create Crocker Motorcycle Company in a small factory at 1346 Venice Blvd in downtown Los Angeles.

== The Crocker Twin ==
In the mid-1930s, Crocker and Bigsby began to work on a heavyweight, high-performance, overhead valve, v-twin motorcycle and in 1936 the first Crocker rolled out of the factory. Crocker knew there was a good market for high-speed touring bikes, but even he was surprised when he received more orders than he could possibly fill for his new 1936 Crocker "Small Tank" 61 cubic inch 1000 cc Hemi-Head model. The Crocker Twin was widely regarded as the fastest production motorcycle in the world. In 1939 Crocker introduced a new and improved model named the Crocker "Big Tank". However, as Crocker was producing during the height of the Depression, it became increasingly difficult for him to manufacture vehicles in small quantities, and in 1942 he abandoned production of motorcycles altogether.

Al Crockers son worked in the Crocker Motorcycle factory machining oil pumps and other parts on weekends and between School. In 1998 Al Crocker Jr. attended the induction of his late father into the Motorcycle Hall of Fame and accepted the medal on his behalf. Al Crocker Jr.now lives in northern California with his wife Mary Jane. They and their entire family attended both the 2006 and 2007 "Legend Of The Motorcycle" Concours d'Elegance at the Ritz Carlton in Half Moon Bay California where the brand his father created over seventy years ago was one of two featured marques. Today Al enjoys a close relationship with the team at the resurrected Crocker Motorcycle Company.

Many Crocker Twin motorcycles are still in existence and are among the most highly prized collectible motorcycles today. Crocker parts are still sought after and coveted. The most recent conservative estimate of the value of an original Crocker in restored condition hovers between $225,000 and $300,000 U.S.

== The company ==
The Crocker Motorcycle Company of today was resurrected in 1997 by Michael Schacht and Markus Karalash to produce the two original models, the Big Tank and Small Tank models that were manufactured by Al Crocker in his factory at 1346 Venice Blvd in Los Angeles.

== See also ==
- Crocker Motorcycles
