= Jerry Covington =

American motorcycle builder (1955–2024)

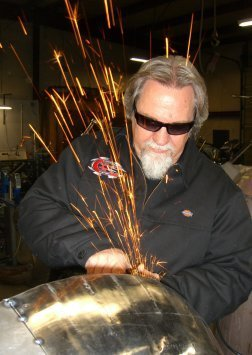
- Covington in 2008
- Born: February 15, 1955; Fort Worth, Texas, U.S.
- Died: October 9, 2024 (aged 69); Woodward, Oklahoma, U.S.
- Occupation: Custom motorcycle builder
- Website: https://www.covingtonscustoms.com/

Jerry Covington (February 15, 1955 – October 9, 2024) was an American custom motorcycle builder and owner of Covingtons Customs.

== Biography ==
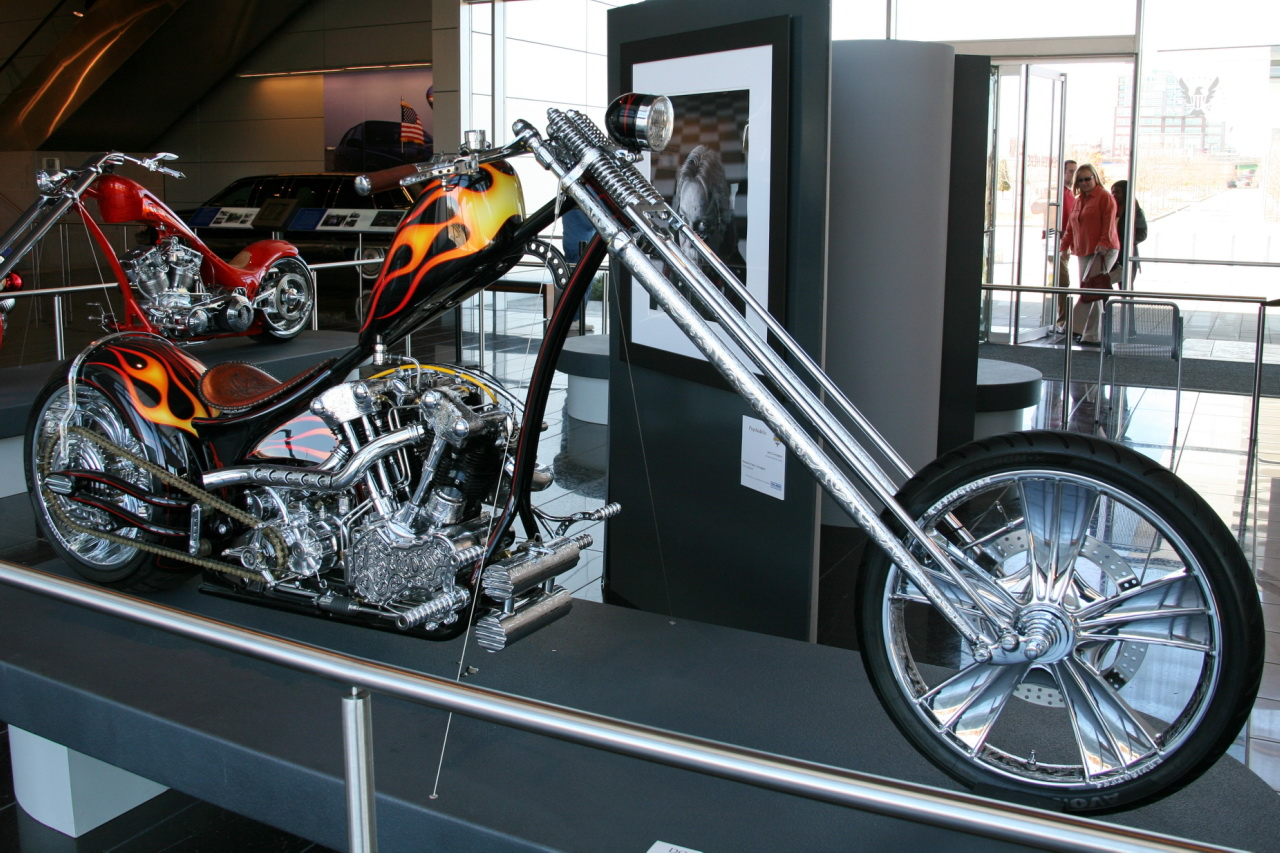
Psychedelic by Jerry Covington

Jerry started building custom motorcycles (choppers) in the early seventies and founded Covingtons Customs in Woodward, Oklahoma, in 1993.

Covington became well known in the motorcycle industry as one of the top custom builders for his clean designs and high quality custom motorcycles, and appeared in numerous television shows including the Discovery Channel's Biker Build-Off series, Carlos Mencia's Mind of Mencia, and Corbin's Ride On.

Covington was also been featured in several custom motorcycle related books including "Art of The Chopper", and "Top Chops".

Covington's unique motorcycles won many awards, have been featured in dozens of magazines, including Easyriders, HotBike, and Street Chopper, and have been photographed by Michael Lichter Photography.

Covington built motorcycles for celebrities such as comedian Carlos Mencia, musician Sammy Hagar, and race car driver Billy Boat.

Covington died on October 9, 2024, at the age of 69.

== Press and publicity ==
=== Magazine covers ===
- American Bagger (U.S.) Apr. 2009
- HotBike (U.S.) Feb. 2009
- Easyriders (Germany) Mar. 2009
- Easyriders (U.S.) May. 2008
- American Cycle (U.S.) Jan. 2008
- Bikers Life (U.S.) Sep. 2008
- Easyriders (U.S.) Oct. 2007
- Biker Zone (Mexico) 2007 Vol 168
- Street Chopper (U.S.) Nov. 2006
- Hot Rod Bikes (U.S.) Jan. 2005
- Easyriders (U.S.) May. 2004
- V-Twin (U.S.) Mar. 2004
- Hot Rod Bikes (U.S.) Oct. 2003
- Street Chopper (U.S.) Apr. 2002

=== Magazine articles ===
- V-Twin (U.S.) Aug. 2009: To Russia, With Love: An International Success Story
- Distinctly Oklahoma (U.S.) Jul. 2009: "Get your Motor Runnin... Head Out on the Highway..."
- American Bagger (U.S.) Apr. 2009: "Covingtons: Retro Custom Bagger"
- HotBike (U.S.) Feb. 2009: Finned with Finess: Covingtons Classy Shovel
- American Bagger (U.S.) Feb. 2009: "Covingtons Customs: Billet Covers Part 2"
- Easyriders (Germany) Mar. 2009: Interview mit Jerry Covington
- V-Twin (U.S.) Apr. 2009: Jerry Covington: In For the Long Haul
- American Bagger (U.S.) May. 2008: The Fabricators Motorcycle: A Covingtons Showcase Bagger
- Easyriders (U.S.) May. 2008: Lucifer II: Giving the Devil His Due
- American Cycle (U.S.) Mar. 2008: Whiskey: Russell Orr's Covington Chopper
- American Cycle (U.S.) Jan. 2008: Covington vs Covington
- AMD (U.S.) Jan. 2008: Covingtons Cycle City: It's a Family Affair
- V-Twin Annual (U.S.) Jan. 2008: A Fist Full of Dollars: Covingtons Hi-Tech Pro-Street
- Hot Bike Baggers (U.S.) Jul. 2008: Sweet Glide: Covingtons Customs FLHX
- Bikers Life (Mexico) Sep. 2008: Psychodelic Chopper
- Easyriders (U.S.) Oct. 2007: One For The Books: Drag Specialties FatBook Sourced by Jerry Covington
- Barnetts (U.S.) Oct. 2007: Covingtons Customs Bobber: Featured Custom
- Easyriders (U.S.) Aug. 2007: A Fist Full of Dollars: Covingtons Hi-Tech Pro-Street
- V-Twin (U.S.) Jun. 2007: One Hundred Bucks Bought It: One lucky ticket holder got the deal of a lifetime
- American Bagger (U.S.) May. 2007: Covingtons Black Bagger Goes to South Africa: A Stunningly Subtle Two Wheeler
- Biker Zone (Mexico) 2007 Vol 168: Covingtons Black Bagger Goes to South Africa: A Stunningly Subtle Two Wheeler
- HotBike (U.S.) 2007 Vol.39 No.9: Covingtons El Capitan: Two Firsts For Covingtons Custom Cycles
- Easyriders (U.S.) Jan. 2006: Covingtons Pagan Gold Hot Rod: Lucifer 1
- Street Chopper (U.S.) Nov. 2006: Covingtons Hot Rod Twin Cam
- Hot Rod Bikes (U.S.) Jan. 2005: Scaring Soccer Moms Everywhere: Ultra Classic Redux
- Iron Works (U.S.) Aug. 2004: Shop Bike Special: Old School Bobber
- American Iron (U.S.) Jun. 2004: Covington Built Bagger: To Mark, It's the best of everything in one machine
- Hot Bike (U.S.) May. 2004: Old School Looks: At an Old School Price
- Easyriders (U.S.) May. 2004: Spirit Of The Chopper: Covingtons Keeper
- V-Twin (U.S.) Mar. 2004: When quality alone does all the selling: It's a Keeper
- Best of American Iron (U.S.) Softail Special 2004: Hold That E: An extreme machine for Xtreme Machine
- Best of American Iron (U.S.) Softail Special 2004: In Spades: Rodeo rider keeps it on two wheels
- Hot Bike (U.S.) Nov. 2003: Stretch Limo: Low Long and Aggressive
- Hot Rod Bikes (U.S.) Oct. 2003: Searchin: It all Began With an Axle Cover
- Street Chopper (U.S.) Jan. 2003: A Builders Bike: Or So He Thought
- V-Twin (U.S.) Dec. 2002: Master Builder Covington: Jerry's Lean, Clean, Running Machines
- Hot Rod Bikes (U.S.) Aug. 2002: Green, Clean, Riding Machine: A Pro Street Built for Two
- V-Twin (U.S.) July. 2002: A Herd of Choppers is Hittin' The Trails: Meanwhile, Back at The Ranch
- Street Chopper (U.S.) Apr. 2002: Arrogant Attitude: You'd Have One Too
- American Iron (U.S.) Apr. 2002: Hold That E: An extreme machine for Xtreme Machine
- Hot Bike (U.S.) Sep. 1998: Jerry's New Bike: All it cost was a shop ticket
- Easyriders (U.S.) Apr. 1997: Mutual Admiration Society

=== Books ===
- Today's Top Custom Bike Builders 2009
- Art of The Bobber 2006
- Top Chops Oct. 2005
- Art of the Chopper Sep. 2005

=== Television appearances ===
- Discovery Channel’s Biker Build-Off : Jerry Covington vs. Warren Vesely January 11, 2005
- Corbin's Ride On!
- Mind of Mencia : Season-1 Episode-9
- V-Twin TV
- Speedvision
- Discover Oklahoma
- Oklahoma Horizon

== Awards and accomplishments ==
- Induction into Sturgis Motorcycle Hall of Fame 2016
- Easyriders Invitational - Dallas 2008, Best of Show
- AMD World Championship 2006, 2nd place: Production Manufacturer
- Discovery Channel’s Biker Build-Off Champion for Jerry Covington vs. Warren Vesely January 11, 2005
- V-Twin Magazine, Best Custom Fabricated Bike
- All American Motorcycle Show 2004, Best of Show: Pro-Builders Class
- Easyriders Invitational - Houston 2004, 2nd place: Best of Show
- Easyriders Invitational - Louisville 2003, 1st place: Best Street Custom
- Easyriders Invitational - Louisville 2003, 2nd place: Best Radical
- Easyriders Invitational - Columbus 2003, 1st place: Best Radical
- Hot Bike Magazine, High Tech Product of 2000, for TC88B frame
