= Larry Linkogle =

American motocross rider (born 1977)

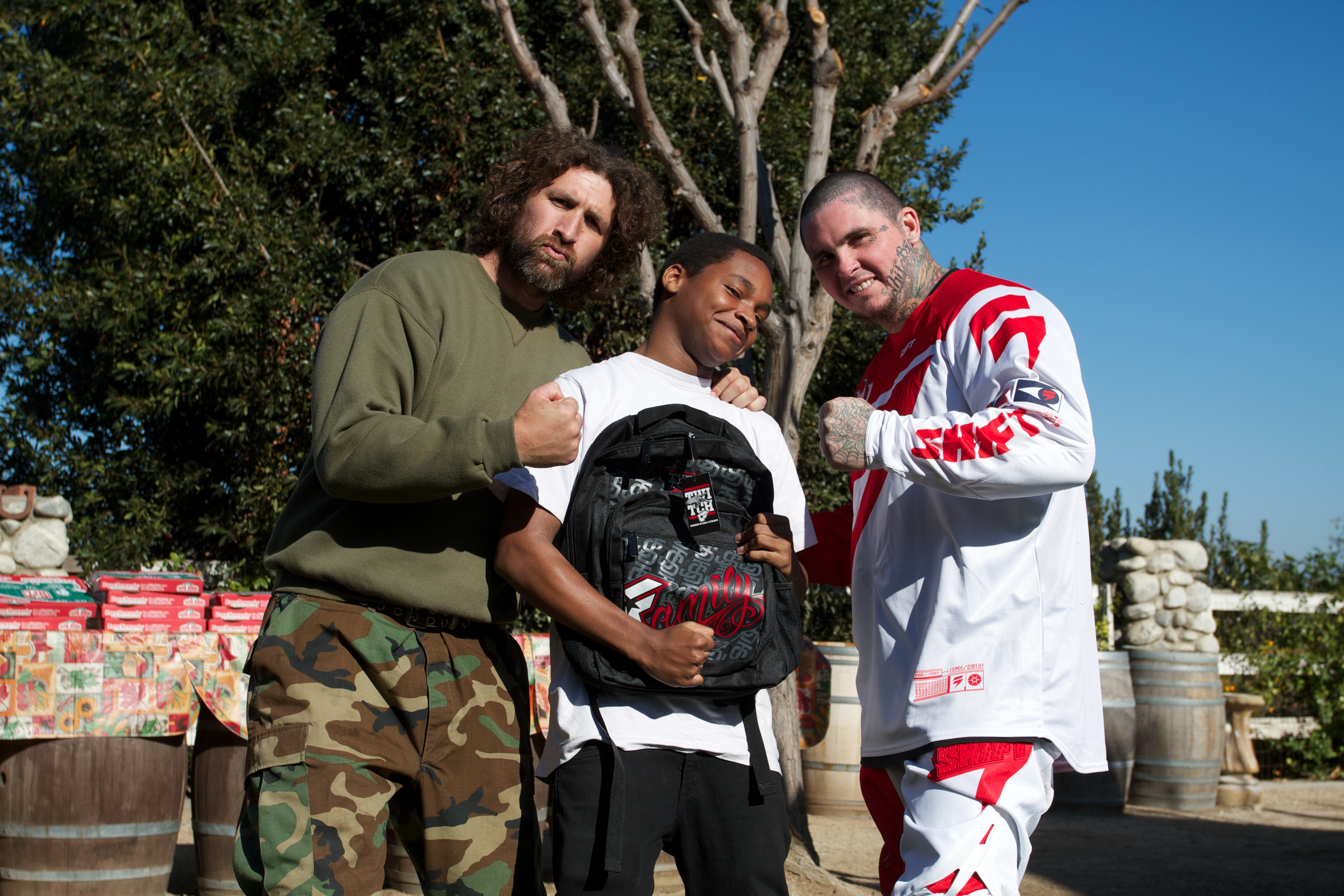
- Linkogle (left) and Bobby Lee at community outreach event in December 2012

Larry "Link" Linkogle (born February 12, 1977, in Orange, California) is a professional freestyle motocross rider and the co-founder and owner of Metal Mulisha, LLC. Linkogle holds the world record for long-distance motorcycle jumps and has appeared in feature films as a stuntman. He is regarded as a founder of freestyle motocross.

Metal Mulisha is a freestyle motocross team and lifestyle apparel line. The brand originated with Linkogle and other riders wearing Metal Mulisha apparel while practicing at the Metal Mulisha Compound, a freestyle motocross (FMX) course built at Linkogle's childhood home.

On December 6, 2001, while serving as a stunt double for Vin Diesel in the film XXX, Linkogle was accidentally struck by a helicopter blade. Initially believed to be minor, his injuries were later found to include frontal lobe damage, a snapped ACL, and a separated shoulder from the resulting fall.

== Early life ==
Linkogle began riding motorcycles in the desert at age 11 and soon began competing in amateur contests. At 16, he became a professional rider. He later transitioned from traditional circuit racing to freestyle riding, focusing on jumps and airborne tricks.

During the early development of freestyle motocross, Linkogle, along with Nathan Fletcher and Trigg Gumm, formed Metal Mulisha. Linkogle placed the Metal Mulisha name on his bike at contests and created branded apparel for the group, which began competing under the name. The group practiced at a freestyle motocross course built at Linkogle's childhood home, which became known as the Metal Mulisha Compound.

== World-record jump ==
On May 5, 2005, at Queensland Raceway, Ipswich, Australia, Linkogle set the world's long-distance record for the 250cc Motorbike class by jumping 255.4 feet. The world-record jump occurred at an event promoted by the Crusty Demons production company. During the event, five other riders set world records.

== Notable achievements ==
1993 - Won AMA Amateur National Supercross Series

1996 - Created Metal Mulisha company

1996 - Created Metal Mulisha Compound

1996 - Won the first freestyle motocross event in Castaic Lake, California, which was promoted by Shane Trittler.

1998 - Performed nationwide on the Vans Warped Tour

1998 - Won second place in the Jump Contest in Portland, Oregon

1998 - Won third place at Free Air Festival

1998 - Promoted first-ever Freestyle Extreme Moto-X Show with the Metal Mulisha Troops at the Winchester Arena, Winchester, California

1998 - Won fifth place in the Freeride Motocross Championship

1999 - Won second place in the Zero Gravity Festival

1999 - Won sixth place in the ESPN X Games in San Francisco, California

2001 - Featured rider in Crusty Demons film Crusty 6

2001 - Won first place in MX 2002 Moto Survival Tour

2002 - Voted the most popular extreme natural terrain rider in the world by Fox Sports/Bluetorch TV during the 2002 Moto Survival Tour

2003 - Nominated for World Stunt Awards and Tories Award for stunts performed in XXX.

2005 - Featured rider in 10th Anniversary Crusty Demons World Tour Australia

2005 - Performed fire jump stunt off Docklands Wharf in Australia

2005 - Performed "superman" stunt into Waitemata Harbour at Princess Wharf in New Zealand

2005 - World-record jump (see above)

2006 - Competed with Mike Metzger in the first-ever Freestyle Biker Build-Off by Discovery Channel

== Entertainment ==
1991 - Stunt double for Edward Furlong as John Connor in Terminator 2: Judgment Day.

1998 - Featured in MTV Sports and Music Festival 2 as himself

2002 - Biker double for Vin Diesel in the film XXX

2002 - Crusty Demons of Dirt, Vol. 4: God Bless the Freaks as himself.

2006 - Biker Build-Off TV series documentary - "Mike Metzger vs. Larry Linkogle" (Episode #5.3)

2009 - Mind of the Demon: The Larry Linkogle Story, a documentary directed and produced by Adam Barker based on Linkogle's memoir. The film won Best Jury International Documentary at the 2009 Bel Air Film Festival and the Audience Award for Best Documentary Feature at the 2010 Slamdance Film Festival.

2013 - Linkogle and other members of Metal Mulisha appeared in the music video "Smash It" by Suicidal Tendencies
