= Build or Bust =

American reality television series

- Starring: Gard Hollinger Russell Mitchell
- Country of origin: United States
- No. of episodes: 23

Production
- Running time: 45 minutes

Original release
- Release: February 23, 2005 – August 9, 2006

Build or Bust is a reality television series.

== Premise ==
The concept for Build or Bust was that host and custom motorcycle builder Russell Mitchell took in a member of the public who thought it would be easy to build a bike "just like the guys on TV." Russell gave the guy (or girl) access to all the tools and parts necessary to make a custom motorcycle, allowing the contestant one month to assemble it. If at the end of that time the contestant built a bike that met Russell's standards, they get to keep it. If they did not, they lost the motorcycle.

== Episode guide ==
=== Season 1: 2005 ===
Season 1 Episode 1: Fat Fingers A short-fused jock attempts to build a bike and inject his own ideas only to discover his head is not as big as his forearms.

Season 1 Episode 2: The Snake Sweet-talking, overly confident Chad slithers his way into the shop.

Season 1 Episode 3: The Sage Professional blacksmith Joe brings an old world discipline and aesthetic to the art of bike building.

Season 1 Episode 4: Girls Can Build, Too Female mechanic Alex is all passion and sass.

Season 1 Episode 5: Bicycle By Day, Chopper By Night - Part 1 Alan converts bicycles into motor bikes in his spare time; Jesse Rooke joins the crew at Exile Cycles.

Season 1 Episode 6: Bicycle By Day, Chopper By Night - Part 2 Tensions rise as the guys at Exile Cycles question Jesse Rooke's motives.

Season 1 Episode 7: The Real Ron Army vet Ron reminisces over life as he fights a new battle, a costume chopper.

Season 1 Episode 8: The William Wall Show Bill Wall builds a custom bike from the ground up.

Season 1 Episode 9: Johnny Comes Marchin' Home Exile bad boy Johnny returns as a master builder. Young Texan Adam brings a lot of confidence and attitude.

Season 1 Episode 10: The Accident Seattle custom woodworker Chris attempts to transfer his knowledge of building with wood to building with metal.

Season 1 Episode 11: The Diva Bike enthusiast and TV personality Kerry Casem attempts to build a custom chopper.

=== Season 2: 2006 ===
Season 2 Episode 1: The Detroit Designer JC builds a bike.

Season 2 Episode 2: Delivery Man by Day, Bike Builder by Night Robb Harbison builds the bike of his dreams.

Season 2 Episode 3: The Farmhand Satya, a hardworking farm worker tries to win a bike in 30 days.

Season 2 Episode 4: Massachusetts Man Jason Roche.

Season 2 Episode 5: Simply 'Mr. Finner'

Season 2 Episode 6: Canada Represents

Season 2 Episode 7: So-Cal Rebel Bike builder Johnathan Smith.

Season 2 Episode 8: Kick Start John Hot rod builder John Schiess.

Season 2 Episode 9: Mini Bike Builder Justin Taylor.

Season 2 Episode 10: Jim the Survivor Jim Silba.

Season 2 Episode 11: Brian the Engineer Tragedy threatens the build.

Season 2 Episode 12: EPISODE: 12 Brian pushes forward in his build though still mourning the passing of his friend.

== See also ==
- Biker Build-Off
