= Quail Motorcycle Gathering =

- Genre: Motorcycle rally and Concours d'Elegance
- Frequency: Annual
- Locations: Quail Lodge, Carmel, California, USA
- Years active: 2009–2019, 2022–
- Previous event: 3 May 2019
- Next event: 13 May 2022
- Participants: c. 400 motorcycles displayed
- Attendance: c. 2,700
- Organizer: Gordon McCall

The Quail Motorcycle Gathering is a motorcycle rally and Concours d'Elegance held annually since 2009 at Carmel, California. Quail participants show bikes, and 100 of them ride the California Highway Patrol motor unit escorted 112 mile Quail Ride around Carmel Valley, which includes three fast laps on the track at Mazda Raceway Laguna Seca. This event evolved from "Legends of the Motorcycle" which had been held at the Ritz-Carlton Hotel in Half Moon Bay, CA for a run of three previous years (2006-2008). The location was changed by organizer Gordon McCall to the Quail Lodge and Golf Club, and is run by Peninsula Events. The Quail Ride is held the Friday before the Saturday show date in May, and there is also another ride on show morning called the Cycle World Tour, a fifty-mile organized but unescorted ride that includes a buffet breakfast along the ocean waterfront in Pacific Grove, CA.

The 2011 3rd Annual event, attended by 1,500, showed over 250 classic motorcycles (150 being judged). The 8th Annual event on May 14, 2016, the show featured paid admissions of 2,700 and over 400 displayed motorcycles, with 237 being judged. In 2017, the event expanded to a three-day affair, and the organizers announced they planned to extend it to a week. The May 3, 2019 event had its first discussion panel on women in motorcycling.

This gathering has been on hiatus since 2020 caused by the COVID-19 pandemic.
