= Metal Mulisha =

American clothing brand

- Type: Private
- Industry: Apparel/Retail
- Genre: Clothing, lifestyle
- Founded: 1997
- Founder: Larry Linkogle, Brian Deegan [Trigger Gumm]
- Headquarters: El Segundo, California, United States
- Products: Action Sports Apparel
- Number of employees: 450
- Divisions: Vendorasia™
- Website: metalmulisha.com

Metal Mulisha is an American lifestyle clothing brand which was created in 1997 by Larry Linkogle and Brian Deegan. Metal Mulisha Inc. products are sold at various retail stores and company owned stores. It also offers Metal Mulisha energy drinks under the same brand in a joint venture with Rockstar. About 450 people work for MMI. The Metal Mulisha Monster Jam truck debuted in 2012. The truck was in competitions until 2017; during this time, Todd Leduc won the Monster Jam World Finals Freestyle competition in 2014, and the World Finals Racing competition in 2015.
