= Biker Build-Off =

Reality television series

- Created by: Thom Beers
- Starring: Hugh King (Master of Ceremonies)
- Narrated by: Thom Beers
- Composer: Ken Mazur
- Country of origin: United States
- No. of episodes: 33

Production
- Running time: 45 minutes
- Production company: Original Productions

Original release
- Network: Discovery Channel
- Release: September 28, 2002 – 2007

Biker Build-Off is a reality television series for the Discovery Channel. Created and narrated by Thom Beers, the series was originally conceived as a single special called The Great Biker Build-Off. The show proved so popular that more episodes were produced in succeeding years, to the point that it was turned into a regular series (and its name shortened to just Biker Build-Off) in 2005.

== Premise of the Show ==
Two custom motorcycle builders from different parts of the country—usually with very different styles of building—each build a unique custom bike in their respective style, pitting their teams and expertise against each other to see who is the better builder according to the contests.

== Format ==
Biker Build-Off was originally an irregularly-grouped series (termed "rounds") of contests that spanned a calendar year. The original Great Biker Build-Off was a single competition. In 2003, the second round had three contests, and the third round (2004) had six. In 2005, the program was turned into a regular series in which each round would feature a total of 13 contests each. There has also been a World Biker Build-Off special (pitting three international bikers) in 2004.

== The rules ==
Various aspects of the rules have evolved over the course of the series. When the show became a regular series, the current rules of the Biker Build-Off were defined as follows:

1. Each builder has 10 days to build a working custom motorcycle in his or her respective style.

- They must obtain a framework, engine, and other necessary parts, construct their unique body, have it painted, and then complete assembling the bike and make it operational before midnight of the tenth day. During this build period, the show switches perspectives back and forth between the two builders as they and their respective teams plan and build their bikes.

2. Upon completion, the two builders bring their bikes to a mutually-agreed neutral location.

- Custom motorcycle master of ceremonies Hugh King (co-executive producer of the series) will meet the two builders at the agreed location and declare where the ride will go and where the bikes will ultimately be judged.

3. When they meet, the two builders and their teams will begin a lengthy ride to a bike show.

- The ride is designed to "break in" each bike and ensure they're both truly road-worthy before they reach the bike show. If a problem emerges that prevents the bike from running, the builder is allowed one hour to repair it before he/she is disqualified. (The disqualification may be waived by the competing builder; several shows have featured instances where the bike would have been disqualified ("DQ'ed") but the other builder did not enforce the rule.)

4. At the bike show, the two bikes will be showcased and a winner decided by an audience ballot.

- Exceptions may occur for specific competitions. A 2007 contest designed to build drag bikes was decided by a best-of-three set of drag races.

== Episode guide ==
=== Round 1: 2002 ===
1. Billy Lane vs. Roger Bourget : Original run : September 28, 2002

=== Round 2: 2003 ===
1. Billy Lane vs. Dave Perewitz : Original run : September 1, 2003
2. Indian Larry vs. Paul Yaffe : Original run : September 1, 2003
3. Billy Lane vs. Indian Larry : Original run : September 1, 2003

Builder 1	Builder 2	Winner
Billy Lane	Dave Perewitz	Billy Lane
Indian Larry	Paul Yaffe	Indian Larry
Billy Lane	Indian Larry	Indian Larry

=== Round 3: 2004 ===
1. Chica vs. Hank Young : Original run : June 21, 2004
2. Cory Ness vs. Arlen Ness : Original run : June 22, 2004
3. Russell Mitchell vs. Eddie Trotta : Original run : June 23, 2004
4. Mitch Bergeron vs. Kendall Johnson : Original run : June 24, 2004
5. Matt Hotch vs. Joe Martin : Original run : June 27, 2004
6. Combined Genius : Original run : June 27, 2004

=== World Biker Build-Off 2004 ===
1. Joe Martin vs. Russell Mitchell vs. Scotty Cox : Original run : September 6, 2004

=== Round 4: 2005 ===
1. Jerry Covington vs. Warren Vesely : Original run : January 11, 2005
2. Joe Martin vs. Shinya Kimura : Original run : January 18, 2005
3. Jesse Rooke vs. Ron Finch : Original run : January 25, 2005
4. Russell Mitchell vs. the Detroit Brothers : Original run : February 1, 2005
5. Indian Larry vs. Mondo : Original run : February 8, 2005
6. Chica vs. Mike Pugliese : Original run : February 15, 2005
7. Cory Ness vs. Eric Gorges : Original run : February 22, 2005
8. Hank Young vs. Cole Foster : Original run : March 1, 2005
9. Billy Lane vs. Mike Brown : Original run : March 8, 2005
10. Kendall Johnson vs. Eddie Trotta : Original run : March 15, 2005
11. Matt Hotch vs. Rick Fairless : Original run : March 22, 2005
12. Arlen Ness vs. Roland Sands : Original run : March 29, 2005
13. The Ultimate Chop : Original run : April 3, 2005

=== Round 5: 2006 ===
1. Billy Lane vs. Russell Mitchell : Original run : August 7, 2006
2. Trevelene vs. Scott Long : Original run : August 14, 2006
3. Mike Metzger vs. Larry Linkogle : Original run : August 21, 2006
4. Kevin Alsop vs. Ivy Tosclair : Original run : August 28, 2006
5. Roland Sands vs. Jesse Rooke : Original run : September 4, 2006
6. Ell Pitts vs. Harold Pontarelli : Original run : September 11, 2006
7. Marcus Walz vs. Michael Prugh : Original run : September 18, 2006
8. Detroit Brothers vs. Jason Kangas : Original run : September 25, 2006
9. Gypsy Charro vs. Kim Suter : Original run : October 2, 2006
10. Paul Yaffe vs. Dave Perewitz : Original run : October 9, 2006
11. Craig Whitford vs. Mike Long : Original run : October 16, 2006
12. Brian Klock vs. Jason Hart : Original run : October 23, 2006
13. Matt Hotch vs. Roger Goldammer : Original run : October 30, 2006

=== Round 6: 2007 ===
1. Gard Hollinger vs. Jason Hart
2. Paul Cox & Keino vs. Trevelen
3. Chica vs. Michael Barragan
4. Bryan Fuller vs. Greg Westbury
5. Dawn Norakas vs. Scott Webster
6. Andrew Williams vs. James Compton
