= Aero bike =

Aero bike also known as "Aerodynamic bike" is a type of road bike that uses aerodynamics principles in its operation. The bike's geometrical makeup allows the hands and body position of the rider to change given the terrain, rider's preference, and race situation. The term is also used for aerodynamic motorcycles.

== History ==
The first construction of aero bike started out as a styling project that featured an extended aerodynamic front with spoilers and advance guard bodywork in early 1985. In the same year, the first aero bike named "Aero-D-Zero" was constructed around a steel trellis frame and bevel drive Ducati motor of Mike Brosnan. The bike was first used in March 1987 BEARS speed trial. It later won the 1988 and 1990 speed trials with speeds of 242.72 km/h and 247.80 km/h respectively.

Meanwhile, increased use of aero bikes was seen 1989 when US road riders started showing great concern with aerodynamics in bicycle riding games. That was when Greg LeMond won the Tour de France over Laurent Fignon by 58 seconds in the final stage time trial. Shortly after the event, bike manufacturers started producing aero wheels, aero helmets, and aero clothing materials meant for road bike-racing. Since that time till date, most multi-sport bike companies have continued to manufacture aero bikes. Today, almost every bike vendor offers aero bikes of various brands across the globe.

== Components ==
Modern day aero bike comes with aerodynamic components such as aero wheels and aero helmets. Most brands also come with a combination of gears, carbon framing and strong durable wheels.

== Uses ==
Aero bike is generally used for bike riding competitions, riding tours and personal bike riding sport.

== Advantages ==
Aero bike comes with the following advantages:

- Makes use of aerodynamics principles
- Comes with durable wheels that withstand friction in motion
- Easy changing of gears
- Fast operation

== Disadvantages ==
Aero bike comes with the following disadvantages:

- Heavier than a comparable non-aero bike
- Could be stiff sometimes when in use
- Long and low race geometry

== See also ==
- Aerodynamics
- Fixed-gear bicycle
- Hybrid bicycle
- Racing bicycle
- Road bicycle
- Time trial bicycle
- Velomobile
