= Falcon Motorcycles =

American company

- Type: Private company
- Industry: Motorcycles
- Founded: 2008
- Headquarters: Los Angeles, California, USA
- Key people: Ian Barry, Amaryllis Knight
- Products: Custom motorcycless
- Number of employees: 1 or 2 (2012)

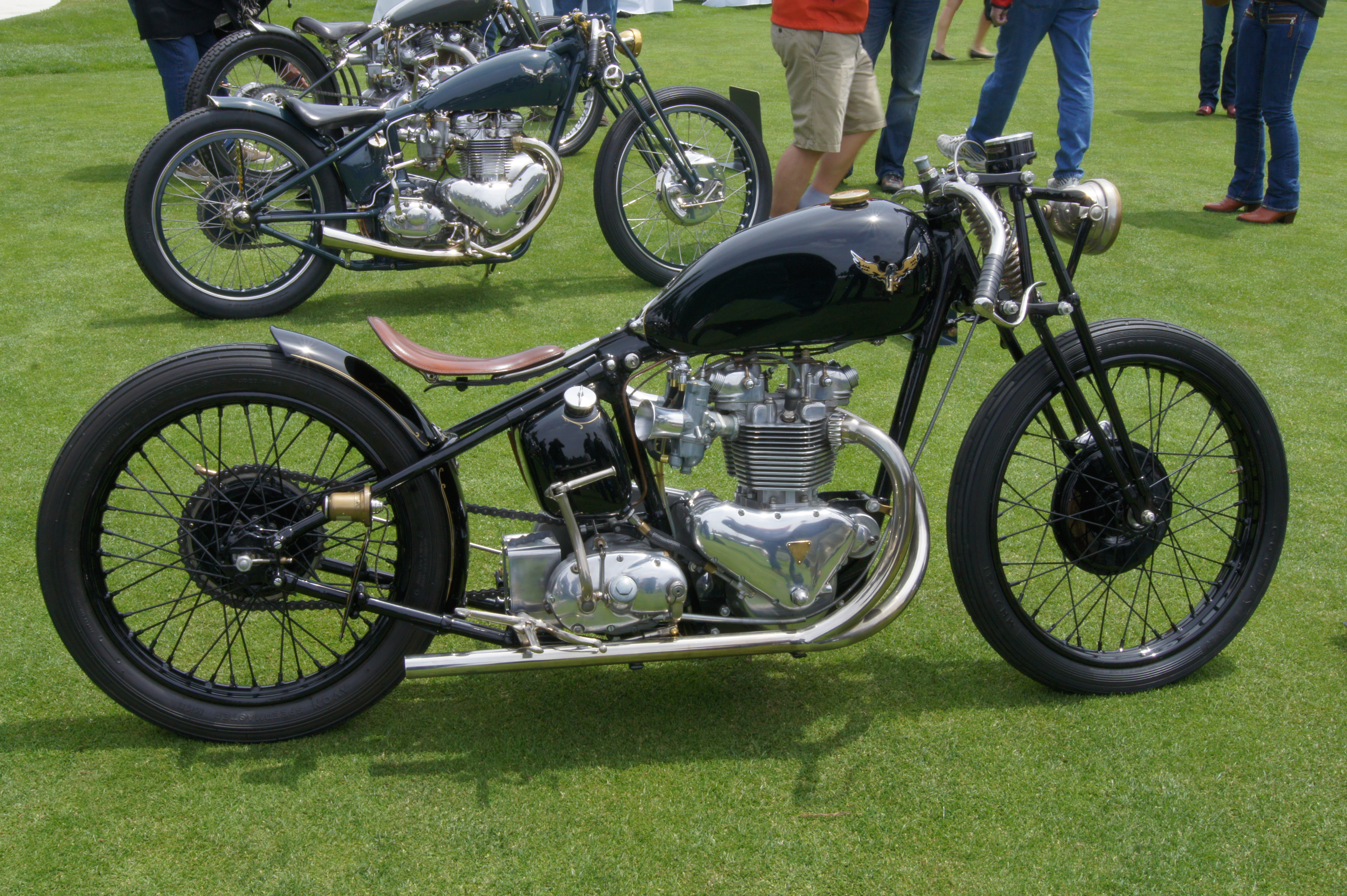
Falcon Bullet in front of the Kestrel, with the Black Falcon in background, at the Quail Motorcycle Gathering

Falcon Motorcycles is a company founded by Ian Barry and Amaryllis Knight in Los Angeles, California in 2008 to build a series of custom motorcycles. Barry set out to design, engineer, and fabricate ten custom motorcycles built around rare engines in a series entitled The Falcon Ten.

== Motorcycles ==
The Falcon Ten series is named after the raptor genus known as Falco. The ten motorcycles are individually titled after various species of falcon: the Bullet, Kestrel, Black, White, Altai, Merlin, Peregrine, Grey, Saker, and Vespertine. Barry has completed The Bullet (2008), The Kestrel (2010), and The Black (2011). inspired and powered by a 1950 Triumph Thunderbird, a modified 1970 Triumph Bonneville, and a 1952 Vincent Black Shadow engine, respectively.

Barry has previously engaged a staff of up to six craftsmen to assist with the fabrication process of various aspects of his motorcycles. Preferring to work on each part personally, Barry currently employs only one CNC programmer. The Bullet was a customized factory-made bike. Since completing The Bullet in 2008, Barry has stopped customizing motorcycles and instead has developed a practice of designing, engineering, and machining each entire motorcycle, with the exception of the engine, carburetor, rims, and tires. Barry starts each motorcycle with a rare or iconic engine, creating an overall design. He then engineers and fabricates each part with CNC machine tools and by hand. According to the Los Angeles Times, Barry's work reflects an "ethos of extreme evolution and design", and each motorcycle is "an engineering feat as much as it's a piece of art".

The first motorcycle in The Falcon Ten series, The Bullet, was a customized 1950 Triumph Thunderbird built out with parts from other rare bikes as well as newly fabricated parts. Commissioned by skateboarder and actor Jason Lee, over 1,000 hours went into its fabrication.

The second motorcycle in the collection, The Kestrel was designed around a 1970 Triumph Bonneville engine that was cut in half and completely re-engineered. The only other parts on The Kestrel that came from factory-made motorcycles are a BSA transmission, the rims, the Dunlop tires, and a portion of the gas tank. Each original part was made by hand or with CNC machine tools and was finished by hand. The Kestrel was named one of Cycle World's 2010 "World's coolest bikes" and was noted for its "purity and depth in both aesthetic and functional execution", for the "mind-bending volume of time spent on the details."

Falcon's third motorcycle, the 'Black', was built around a 1950 Vincent Black Shadow engine unit. Their fourth machine, the 'White' is currently under construction (as of November 2012), and is based on a 1967 Velocette Thruxton motor and gearbox. The 'Black' was displayed for one year at the Petersen Museum in Los Angeles in the 'Custom Revolution' exhibition in 2018.

=== Awards ===
- Legend of the Motorcycle International Concours (2008)
- The Quail Motorcycle Concours (2010)
- The Quail Motorcycle Concours (2011)
