= Crocker Motorcycles =

US motorcycle manufacturer

The Crocker Motorcycle Company is an American manufacturer, based in Los Angeles, California, founded by Albert Crocker. Located at 1346 Venice Blvd, Crocker produced a series of kits and whole motorcycles between 1931 and 1941: an overhead-valve conversion kit for the Indian 101 Scout motor (1932), a single-cylinder speedway racer (1934), powerful V-twin road motorcycles (1936–40), and the Scootabout (1940–41)motor scooter. Production ceased in 1941.

In 1999 Crocker Motorcycle Company was revived to manufacture replacement parts and complete Small and Big Tank Crockers in Southern California, following the original specifications. Michael Schacht is Crocker Motorcycle company President.

== Original Crocker company ==
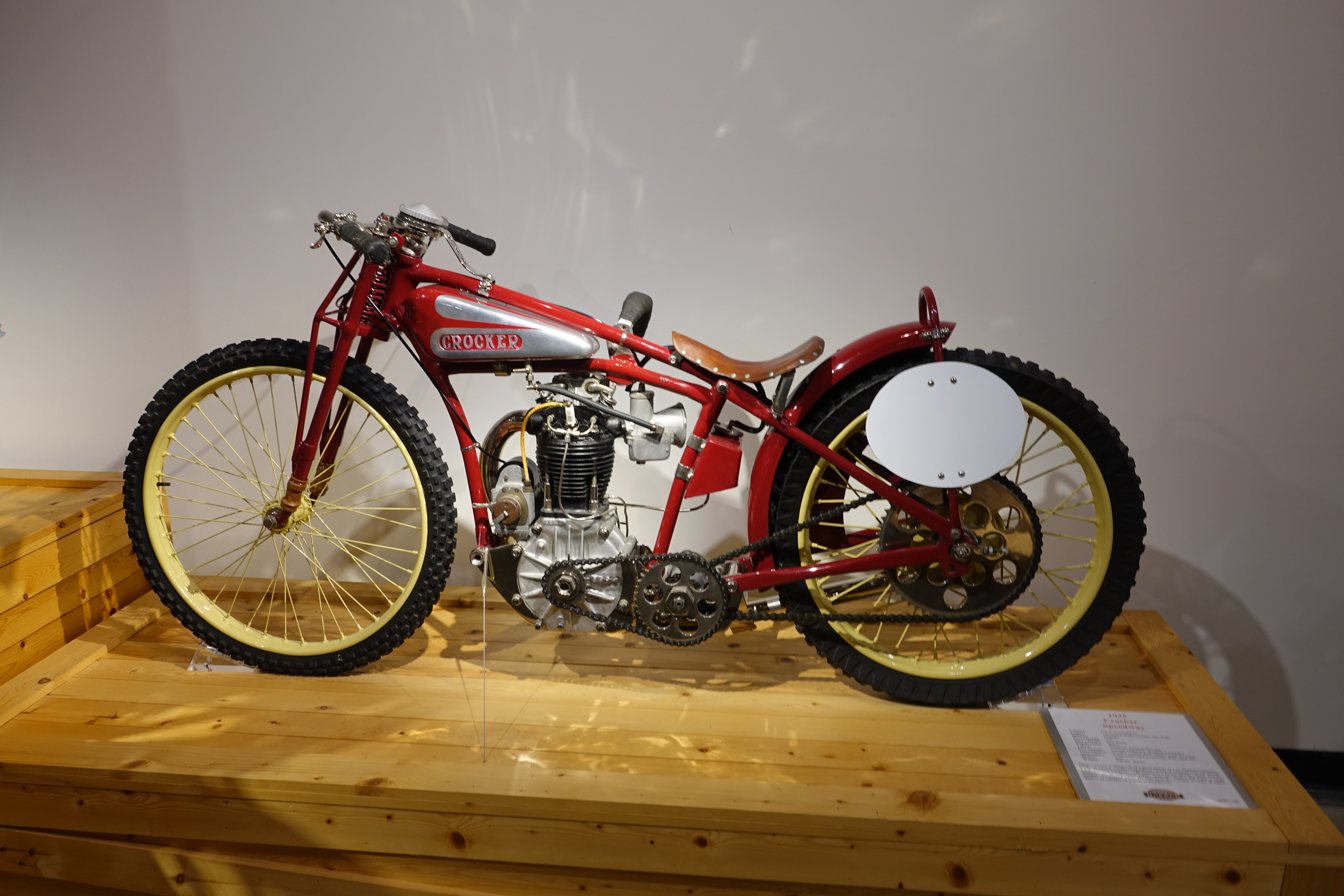
1935 Crocker Speedway motorcycle on display at the Barber Vintage Motorsports Museum, Birmingham, Alabama. The single-cylinder motorcycle had a displacement of 499cc and weighed 220 pounds.

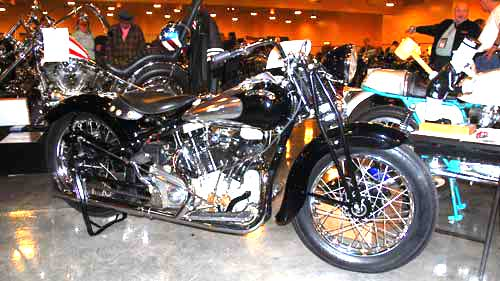
This 1941 Crocker sold for $230,000 at auction in 2007.

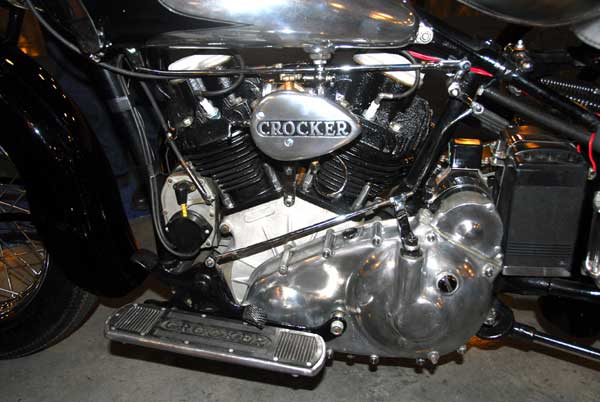
Crocker engine

Crocker's first manufacturing projects focused on accessory parts for Indian motorcycles, including steering dampers. Crocker next designed an overhead-valve conversion kit for Indian 101 Scout V-twins, intended for dirt track racing. The first example of the Crocker-Indian was raced by Paul Lannon in 1931. Subsequent limited production of the OHV Indian kit in 1932 used a reduced engine capacity of 500cc to comply with AMA racing rules. Crocker advertised these "30:50" racing motors in his catalog / magazine 'Throttle Crax' in August 1932. The motor proved fast, it was heavier than the dominant single-cylinder racers from Douglas and Harley-Davidson, etc. The October 1933 issue of 'The Motorcyclist' notes that Crocker built four of these motors.

Crocker next designed and built a single-cylinder speedway racing motorcycle in 1933, according to 'The Motorcyclist' in October 1933, "An American-Made Speedway Machine." The Crocker Speedway used an overhead-valve 30.50 cubic inch/500cc engine installed in a chassis designed by Crocker, and based on the dominant racing Rudge speedway motorcycle. The official AMA magazine The Motorcyclist (December 1930) noted the debut of the Crocker Speedway motorcycle: "…two spotless and keen pieces of racing equipment surely worthy of the best the country had to offer as their pilots. The first race was ridden by Jack Milne…speedman par excellence…and Cordy Milne….Two American-built night speedway racing engines swept the boards…9 first places and 3 second spots out of 12 starts…The call came suddenly for the builder, for Al Crocker who was in the pits…[He] came to the microphone. His speech was short, brief; just the sort of thing that the situation called for…He was glad that they [the bikes] were good…They would be better.”

Crocker later (c.1933) designed and built a prototype of an experimental overhead-camshaft single-cylinder speedway racing engine, with a chain-driven camshaft. No record exists of this engine being raced, although one example is known to survive.

In 1934–35, working with Paul Bigsby, Crocker designed a new overhead-valve V-twin with 61 in^{3} (1,000 cc) engine, initially with hemispherical combustion chambers (Hemi head)producing 50 hp, making it one of the most powerful motorcycles in the world, and exceeding the horsepower of rivals the Indian Chief and Harley-Davidson EL 'Knucklehead'. The Crocker V-twin was 80 lbs lighter than the Harley-Davidson EL, with an increase of 10-15 hp. The design of the Crocker chassis was unique, with the steel casting for the 3-speed transmission brazed directly into the frame.

Production appears to have begun in late 1935, as the first mention of the Crocker V-twin was in the February 1936 issue of 'The Motorcyclist'. Crocker Motorcycles had no manufacturing capacity, and used Paul Bigsby's technical drawings to outsource production of parts: aluminum fuel tanks, crankcases, and footboards, steel gears, shafts, and flywheels, etc. There is some suggestion that Al Crocker hoped to sell the design of his V-twin to Indian, who did not produce an OHV V-twin road machine, unlike its rival Harley-Davidson. According to Floyd Clymer, a contemporary of Al Crocker who also owned an Indian dealership in the Los Angeles area, "After about four years, Mr. Crocker discontinued manufacturing, as his costs for custom-made limited production units were too high to compete with the large manufacturers". Thus, Crocker V-twins were most likely built only between 1935 and 1940.

In 1940, Crocker advertised a new machine, the Scootabout scooter, using a Lauson TLC sidevalve engine of 2.3 hp, with an automatic (CVT) transmission. The Scootabout was advertised by Crocker through December 1941. It is unknown how many Scootabouts were produced.

Crocker V-twins are among the world's most expensive motorcycles today. At the MidAmerica Auctions motorcycle auction in January 2007 in Las Vegas, a 1941 Crocker big tank motorcycle sold for $230,000. At the Gooding & Co. auction in 2006 in Chandler, a 1931 Crocker 61 sold for $236,500. At the Bonhams & Butterfield 2006 auction in New York, a 1937 Crocker "Hemi-head" V-Twin brought $276,500. At the 2006 auction of Bator International in California, a 1939 Crocker 61 cubic-inch side valve model sold for $200,000. The most recent Crocker Motorcycle sold through Mecum Motorcycle Auction in Las Vegas, January 2019, and achieved a record-breaking $704,000 sale price. At the Mecum Monterey Auction, August 2019 1936 Crocker Small Tank achieved a record $750,000. On Feb. 1 2025, a 1938 Crocker Small Tank, engine number 38.61.46, was sold for a record auction price of $880,000.
