= Billy Lane =

American builder of custom motorcycles

- Born: February 6, 1970 (age 56); Miami, Florida
- Education: Florida State University; Florida International University
- Known for: Actor, motorcycle customizer

William David Lane (born February 6, 1970, in Miami, Florida) is an American builder of custom motorcycles, owner of Choppers Inc. in Melbourne, Florida, known for his 2009 conviction and imprisonment in Florida for a drunk-driving incident in 2006, where Lane's driving caused the death of another biker.

Lane became well known from his appearances on the Discovery Channel show Biker Build-Off.

Lane has authored two books, an autobiography, Billy Lane's Chop Fiction: It's not a Motorcycle, Baby, It's a Chopper (2004, Motorbooks International) and Billy Lane's How to Build Old School Choppers, Bobbers And Customs (2005, Motorbooks International). Lane also holds an associate degree from Florida State University as well as a Bachelor of Science degree in mechanical engineering from Florida International University, graduating in 1997.

== September 2006 drunk-driving fatal crash ==
On September 5, 2006, driving a promotional 2006 Dodge Ram on Florida Route A1A, his driving license having been revoked in a previous incident in North Carolina, Lane crossed a double yellow line to pass two cars, striking head-on the 1983 Yamaha motorcycle ridden by 56-year-old Gerald Morelock, a park ranger at Sebastian Inlet State Park, in the oncoming lane. Morelock suffered extensive injuries, and was pronounced dead at the scene.

Lane turned himself in on Monday, September 21 in connection with the fatal crash, facing charges including driving under the influence and manslaughter, his BAC having registered 0.192 at the scene of the crash, more than twice the Florida legal limit of 0.08. Gerald Morelock's family filed a lawsuit against Lane and Chrysler. Billy Lane entered a plea of "not guilty" the day he was officially charged with the second-degree felony.

The incident drew a range of responses from the motorcycle community, with some calling for stiffer penalties because Lane was himself a motorcyclist, and others calling for leniency for the same reason.

On August 14, 2009, Lane was convicted (pleading no contest) on one count of vehicular homicide and sentenced to 6 years in prison, 3 years of supervised probation, and loss for life of his driver's license. In arguing for the maximum sentence, the prosecuting attorney cited speeding violations and a pattern of poor driving on Lane's driving record. A judge had earlier approved a plea deal where prosecutors dropped the felony DUI and manslaughter charges. Prior to the plea deal, Lane had been facing up to 30 years in prison. Lane was incarcerated at the Avon Park Work Camp with a projected release date of 10/20/2014. As of 02/24/2013, according to the Florida Department of Corrections website, he was at the Orlando Transition Center (male facility) and released 09/18/2014.

Previously, in June 2006, Lane had also been arrested by the North Carolina Highway Patrol and charged with drunk driving. After refusing to take a breathalyzer test at the scene and leaving prosecutors without evidence presentable in court, Lane was found not guilty. Because his license had, however, been revoked in North Carolina, he had lost his right to drive in Florida at the time of the fatal crash.

Closures at his Choppers, Inc. shop at the time of his arrests were coincidental; it had been closed for renovation.

== Video appearances ==
- Monster Garage
- Big!
- Corbin's Ride On!
- Blood, Sweat, and Gears Tour DVD starring Aaron Green, Kendall Johnson, Mondo Porras, Paul Cox and Jennifer Scott
- Biker Build-Off
- American Biker
