= Christopher Kimball's Milk Street =

American cooking instruction media company

- Company type: Private
- Founder: Christopher Kimball
- Headquarters: Milk Street, Boston, Massachusetts, United States
- Products: TV and radio shows, magazine, podcasts
- Services: Cooking instruction
- Website: 177milkstreet.com

Christopher Kimball's Milk Street is a multimedia, instructional food preparation organization created by Christopher Kimball. The organization comprises a weekly half-hour television program seen on public television stations, a magazine called Christopher Kimball's Milk Street, a cooking school, a weekly one-hour radio program heard on public radio stations called Milk Street Radio, a website for video podcasts, as well as Milk Street Live! which broadcasts live cooking events.

== Name and location ==
The organization is named after Milk Street in Boston, Massachusetts. It is headquartered in the Flour and Grain Exchange Building on Milk Street, which is in the Custom House District near Boston Harborwalk.

== History ==
=== America's Test Kitchen Lawsuit ===
On October 31, 2016, Boston Commons Press sued Kimball. The then-Brookline based company (now based in Boston), which owns America's Test Kitchen (ATK) and Cook's Country, filed a lawsuit in Suffolk Superior Court against Kimball that alleged he "literally and conceptually ripped off America’s Test Kitchen".

The lawsuit claimed that Kimball was in breach of trust when he built his new business while still employed by ATK and that he used their company's recipes and databases to enable Milk Street to be in direct competition with ATK. Jack Bishop, the chief creative officer at ATK, stated that the Milk Street magazine was very similar to Boston Commons Press-owned Cook's Illustrated. Kimball founded that magazine and was editor until November 2015 when he left over a contract dispute. The lawsuit was settled in 2019.

=== Milk Street Cafe Lawsuit ===
Kimball's Milk Street Organization was also sued by the Milk Street Cafe, owned by Marc Epstein, for trademark infringement. Epstein's Milk Street Cafe, established 35 years earlier, is located nearby at 50 Milk Street. The lawsuit was decided in Kimball's favor.

== Television ==
List of episodes

=== Season 1 ===
No. overall	No. in season	Title	Original release date
1	1	"Home Cooking, Chinese Style"	September 9, 2017
2	2	"The New Baking"	September 15, 2017
3	3	"From Thailand with Love"	September 23, 2017
4	4	"Tahini Rules!"	September 30, 2017
5	5	"Mexico Every Single Day"	October 7, 2017
6	6	"Milk Street Suppers"	October 14, 2017
7	7	"Milk Street Italian"	October 21, 2017
8	8	"Simply Spanish"	October 28, 2017
9	9	"Not Your Mother's Cake"	November 4, 2017
10	10	"Milk Street Menu"	November 11, 2017
11	11	"Milk Street Holidays"	November 18, 2017
12	12	"Crazy Noodles"	November 25, 2017
13	13	"Japan Fries Chicken"	December 2, 2017

=== Season 2 ===
No. overall	No. in season	Title	Original release date
14	1	"Home Cooking in Taiwan"	September 8, 2018
15	2	"Quick Suppers From Madrid"	September 15, 2018
16	3	"Middle East Classics"	September 22, 2018
17	4	"Japanese Tuesday Nights"	September 29, 2018
18	5	"Easy French Desserts"	October 6, 2018
19	6	"Secrets of Thailand"	October 13, 2018
20	7	"Pizza and Pasta"	October 20, 2018
21	8	"Tunisian Couscous"	October 27, 2018
22	9	"New Mexico, Old Mexico"	November 3, 2018
23	10	"Taipei Cooking Lesson"	November 10, 2018
24	11	"South African Barbecue"	November 17, 2018
25	12	"Porchetta At Home"	November 24, 2018
26	13	"Chicken From Paris To The Middle East"	December 1, 2018
27	14	"The Japanese Quick Cook"	December 8, 2018
28	15	"Middle East Favorites"	December 15, 2018
29	16	"New Breads"	December 22, 2018
30	17	"A Trip to Senegal"	December 29, 2018
31	18	"Chicken the Chinese Way"	January 5, 2019
32	19	"South American Classics"	January 12, 2019
33	20	"Everyday Turkish Favorites"	January 19, 2019
34	21	"From Vietnam to Burma"	January 26, 2019
35	22	"Singapore Satay, Soup and Sling"	February 2, 2019
36	23	"West African Weeknight Supper"	February 9, 2019

=== Season 3 ===
 15

No. overall	No. in season	Title	Original release date
37	1	"The Oaxacan Kitchen"	September 7, 2019
38	2	"The Joy of Cooking Lebanon"	September 14, 2019
39	3	"Italian the Right Way"	September 21, 2019
40	4	"Baking in Paris"	September 28, 2019
41	5	"The Secrets of Stir Fry"	October 5, 2019
42	6	"Chicken Around the World"	October 12, 2019
43	7	"Greece Every Day"	October 19, 2019
44	8	"Milk Street Italian Classics"	October 26, 2019
45	9	"Enchiladas and Molletes"	November 2, 2019
46	10	"On The Road: Portland, Maine"	November 9, 2019
47	11	"Milk Street Sweets"	November 16, 2019
48	12	"Beirut Fast Food"	November 23, 2019
49	13	"Tuesday Night Italian"	November 30, 2019
50	14	"Holiday Entertaining"	December 7, 2019
51	15	"The New Paris"	December 14, 2019
52	16	"Amazing One-Layer Cakes"	December 21, 2019
53	17	"The Austrian Table"	December 28, 2019
54	18	"Cooking With Chilies"	January 4, 2020
55	19	"Thailand North to South"	January 11, 2020
56	20	"New French Classics"	January 18, 2020
57	21	"Secrets of Oaxaca"	January 25, 2020
58	22	"From Morocco to Egypt"	February 1, 2020
59	23	"The New Australia"	February 8, 2020

=== Season 4 ===
No. overall	No. in season	Title	Original release date
60	1	"Weeknight Italian"	September 12, 2020
61	2	"Mexican Favorites"	September 19, 2020
62	3	"From Spain with Love"	September 26, 2020
63	4	"Everyday Middle Eastern Cooking"	October 3, 2020
64	5	"Best European Desserts"	October 10, 2020
65	6	"Milk Street Bakes!"	October 17, 2020
66	7	"Entertaining Favorites"	October 24, 2020
67	8	"Lasagna Bolognese"	October 31, 2020
68	9	"French Showstopper Desserts"	November 7, 2020
69	10	"Weeknight Mexican"	November 14, 2020
70	11	"Vegetable Makeovers"	November 21, 2020
71	12	"Middle East Favorites"	November 28, 2020
72	13	"Vietnamese Every Day"	December 5, 2020
73	14	"All-New Italian"	December 11, 2020
74	15	"The Greek Kitchen"	December 18, 2020
75	16	"Secret Italian Recipes"	December 26, 2020
76	17	"New Israeli Cuisine"	January 1, 2021
77	18	"Meatballs And More"	January 8, 2021
78	19	"Indian Classics At Home"	January 15, 2021
79	20	"Quick Pasta"	January 22, 2021
80	21	"New American Bakery"	January 29, 2021
81	22	"Argentina Favorites"	February 5, 2021
82	23	"Cake And Scones"	February 12, 2021

=== Season 5 ===
No. overall	No. in season	Title	Original release date
83	1	"Mexico City Favorites"	September 11, 2021
84	2	"Middle Eastern Meets London"	September 18, 2021
85	3	"Tuesday Night Bologna"	September 25, 2021
86	4	"Portuguese Classics"	October 1, 2021
87	5	"Israel New and Old"	October 8, 2021
88	6	"Milk Street Vegetarian"	October 15, 2021
89	7	"The Secrets of Amalfi"	October 22, 2021
90	8	"Cheryl Day Bakes Cakes!"	October 29, 2021
91	9	"Taste of Vietnam"	November 5, 2021
92	10	"Everyday Venice"	November 12, 2021
93	11	"The Turkish Kitchen"	November 19, 2021
94	12	"The New NY Cheesecake!"	November 26, 2021
95	13	"Summer Kitchens"	December 3, 2021
96	14	"Milk Street Chocolate Cakes"	December 10, 2021
97	15	"Udon Noodles at Home"	December 17, 2021
98	16	"A Taste of Crete"	December 24, 2021
99	17	"Schnitzel and Mashed!"	December 31, 2021
100	18	"Cooking of Ukraine"	January 7, 2022
101	19	"La Cocina de Puerto Vallarta"	January 14, 2022
102	20	"The Art of Japanese Cooking"	January 21, 2022
103	21	"Tuesday Night Mediterranean"	January 28, 2022
104	22	"Souvlaki and Flatbread"	February 4, 2022
105	23	"Flavors of Ethiopia"	February 11, 2022

=== Season 6 ===
No. overall	No. in season	Title	Original release date
106	1	"L.A.'s Best Tacos"	September 10, 2022
107	2	"Greek Meze"	September 17, 2022
108	3	"The Real Fettuccine Alfredo"	September 24, 2022
109	4	"Moroccan Flatbread"	October 1, 2022
110	5	"Quick Desserts"	October 8, 2022
111	6	"New Wave Pizzas"	October 15, 2022
112	7	"All-Star Vegetables"	October 22, 2022
113	8	"Mexico City Tacos"	October 29, 2022
114	9	"Venetian Pastas"	November 5, 2022
115	10	"Salad for Dinner"	November 12, 2022
116	11	"Stir-Fry Favorites"	November 19, 2022
117	12	"Mexican Shrimp"	November 26, 2022
118	13	"Breakfast Baking"	December 3, 2022
119	14	"Favorite Chicken Soups"	December 10, 2022
120	15	"The Pies of Yelapa"	December 17, 2022
121	16	"Milk Street Pantry Staples"	December 24, 2022
122	17	"The Best Falafel"	December 31, 2022
123	18	"Hearty Stews"	January 7, 2023
124	19	"Breads from Around the World"	January 14, 2023
125	20	"Pasta Secrets"	January 21, 2023
126	21	"The Turkish Table"	January 28, 2023
127	22	"Best Beef Stews"	February 4, 2023
128	23	"Simple Cakes"	February 11, 2023
129	24	"Brazilian Pizza"	February 18, 2023
130	25	"A Jordanian Supper"	February 25, 2023
131	26	"Weeknight Soups"	March 4, 2023

=== Season 7 ===
No. overall	No. in season	Title	Original release date
132	1	"The Cooking of Colombia"	September 10, 2023
133	2	"Simple Italian"	September 17, 2023
134	3	"The Joy of Cooking, Jalisco-Style"	September 24, 2023
135	4	"Skillet Dinners"	October 1, 2023
136	5	"Chicken Three Ways"	October 8, 2023
137	6	"Miso: The Magic Ingredient"	October 15, 2023
138	7	"Meaty Stews"	October 22, 2023
139	8	"Bundt Cake, Butter Bars and Meringue"	October 29, 2023
140	9	"Cook What You Have"	November 5, 2023
141	10	"The Middle Eastern Kitchen"	November 12, 2023
142	11	"Best Roasted Chicken"	November 19, 2023
143	12	"One-Dish Skillet Dinners"	November 26, 2023
144	13	"Quick Noodles"	December 3, 2023
145	14	"London: New Indian Food"	December 10, 2023
146	15	"Kebab, Hummus and Date Cookies"	December 17, 2023
147	16	"Loaf Cakes: Chocolate, Plum and Lemon"	December 24, 2023
148	17	"Scones, Doughnuts and Banana Bread"	December 31, 2023
149	18	"Thai Street Food"	January 7, 2024
150	19	"Rome: Spaghetti, Gnocchi and Cloud Bread"	January 14, 2024
151	20	"Shakshuka and Tagine"	January 21, 2024
152	21	"Paris: Bahn Mi, Pork Rice Bowls and Vietnamese Wings"	January 28, 2024
153	22	"Favorite Italian Classics"	February 4, 2024
154	23	"Korean Fried Chicken"	February 11, 2024

=== Season 8 ===
No. overall	No. in season	Title	Original release date
155	1	"New Bistro Classics"	September 11, 2024
156	2	"Mexico's Riviera"	September 18, 2024
157	3	"Vegetables for Meat Lovers"	September 25, 2024
158	4	"In Search of Cacio e Pepe"	October 2, 2024
159	5	"Blender Cakes"	October 9, 2024
160	6	"The Real Chicken Kyiv"	October 16, 2024
161	7	"The Spice Kitchen"	October 23, 2024
162	8	"Italy's Forgotten Pastas"	October 30, 2024
163	9	"Milk Street Thanksgiving"	November 6, 2024
164	10	"Parisian Sweets"	November 13, 2024
165	11	"New Potatoes"	November 20, 2024
166	12	"The Weekend Baker"	November 27, 2024
167	13	"Thai Takeout"	December 4, 2024
168	14	"Milk Street Holiday"	December 11, 2024
169	15	"The Sichuan Kitchen"	December 18, 2024
170	16	"Basque Cheesecake"	December 25, 2024
171	17	"Flatbreads 101"	January 1, 2025
172	18	"Dressing Up Chicken"	January 8, 2025
173	19	"Biryani and Curry"	January 15, 2025
174	20	"Milk Street Steakhouse"	January 22, 2025
175	21	"Back Streets Rome"	January 29, 2025
176	22	"New Cookie Classics"	February 5, 2025
177	23	"Chicken Paprikash"	February 12, 2025

=== Season 9 ===
No. overall	No. in season	Title	Original release date
178	1	"The Real Spaghetti and Meatballs"	September 5, 2025
179	2	"New Salads"	September 12, 2025
180	3	"Best Romanian Baking"	September 20, 2025
181	4	"Tomato Makeovers"	September 29, 2025
182	5	"Hong Kong Classics"	October 3, 2025
183	6	"Milk Street Pizza Party"	October 10, 2025
184	7	"Apple Strudel & Schnitzel"	October 18, 2025
185	8	"Coconut Curry and Stir-Fried Chicken"	October 24, 2025
186	9	"Everyone is Wrong About Pie!"	October 31, 2025
187	10	"Cheese Bread & Garlic Chicken"	November 7, 2025
188	11	"New Holiday Vegetables"	November 14, 2025
189	12	"Best Italian Desserts"	November 21, 2025
190	13	"The New Chicken Noodle Soup"	November 28, 2025
191	14	"New Christmas Cookies"	December 5, 2025
192	15	"Backroads Romania"	December 12, 2025
193	16	"Professional Breads at Home"	December 19, 2025
194	17	"Favorite Italian Soups"	December 26, 2025
195	18	"Fearless Fish"	January 2, 2026
196	19	"Easy Enchiladas"	January 9, 2026
197	20	"Favorite Forgotten Cakes"	January 17, 2026
198	21	"The Secrets of Curry"	January 23, 2026
199	22	"Eggs Around the World"	January 30, 2026
200	23	"Simple Italian Pastas"	February 6, 2026

== Milk Street Radio ==
Milk Street also produces a weekly hour-long radio program titled Milk Street Radio, distributed by the Public Radio Exchange to a number of public radio stations and networks for weekend airing. It also features TV chef and cookbook author Sara Moulton. It premiered on October 20, 2016. Milk Street Radio is also distributed as a podcast.

== Magazine ==
Each issue of the magazine is 30 to 40 pages and is published 6 times each year.
