= List of Cook's Country episodes =

The following is a list of episodes of the public television cooking show, Cook's Country, in the United States. The program started with 13 shows in 2008.

== Series overview ==
Season	Episodes	Originally released	
Season	Episodes	First released	Last released
1	13	September 6, 2008	November 29, 2008
2	13	September 5, 2009	November 28, 2009
3	13	September 4, 2010	November 27, 2010
4	13	September 10, 2011	January 14, 2012
5	13	September 15, 2012	December 8, 2012
6	13	September 7, 2013	November 23, 2013
7	13	August 30, 2014	November 22, 2014
8	13	September 13, 2015	December 6, 2015
9	13	August 27, 2016	November 19, 2016
10	13	August 26, 2017	November 18, 2017
11	13	August 25, 2018	November 17, 2018
12	13	August 24, 2019	November 16, 2019
13	13	September 12, 2020	December 5, 2020
14	13	September 18, 2021	December 11, 2021
15	18	August 20, 2022	December 17, 2022
16	15	September 9, 2023	December 16, 2023
17	26	September 21, 2024	May 24, 2025
18	26	September 20, 2025	May 23, 2026
19	26	September 19, 2026	May 22, 2027

== Season 1 (2008) ==
No.	Title	Original release date
1	"Forgotten Cakes"	September 6, 2008
Recipes for chocolate blackout cake and strawberry poke cake. Featuring a Taste Test on milk chocolate.
2	"Sunday Dinner"	September 13, 2008
Recipes for Sunday-best garlic roast beef and mashed potato casserole. Featuring an Equipment Review covering liquid dish soap. Axel appears in this episode.
3	"Feeding a Crowd, Italian-Style"	September 20, 2008
Recipes for meatballs and marinara and Italian Sunday gravy. Featuring a Taste Test on jarred pasta sauce and an Equipment Review covering large saucepans.
4	"Southern Regional Recipes"	September 27, 2008
Recipes for Lexington-Style pulled pork for charcoal grill and Memphis chopped coleslaw. Featuring a Taste Test on hot dogs and an Equipment Review covering tabletop grills. Julia Collin-Davison cooks both recipes with Christopher Kimball.
5	"Autumn Supper"	October 4, 2008
Recipes for old-fashioned roast pork and cranberry-apple crisp. Featuring an Equipment Review covering pepper mills. Axel appears in this episode.
6	"All-American Picnic"	October 11, 2009
Recipes for extra-crunchy fried chicken, all-American potato salad, and hard-cooked eggs. Featuring a Taste Test on potato chips. Erin McMurrer appears in this episode.
7	"Easy as Pie"	October 18, 2008
Recipes for no-fear pie crust and raspberry chiffon pie. Featuring a Taste Test on pie crusts. Bridget Lancaster cooks with Christopher Kimball.
8	"Steakhouse Favorites"	October 25, 2008
Recipes for super-stuffed baked potatoes and broiled steaks. Featuring Equipment Reviews covering electric knife sharpeners and steak knives. Axel appears in this episode.
9	"Barbecued Chicken"	November 1, 2008
Recipes for best potluck macaroni and cheese, classic barbecued chicken, classic barbecued chicken on a gas grill, and basic pantry BBQ sauce. Axel appears in this episode.
10	"Regional Chops"	November 8, 2008
Recipes for Tennessee-whiskey pork chops, smoked double-thick pork chops, and smoked double-thick pork chops on a gas grill.
11	"Midwestern Favorites"	November 15, 2008
Recipes for Cincinnati chili and Chicago-style barbecued ribs. Featuring a Taste Test on cheddar cheese.
12	"California Grilling"	November 22, 2008
Recipes for Santa Maria salsa and California barbecue tri-tip and beans. Featuring Taste Tests on salsas and jarred medium salsa, and an Equipment Review covering essential grilling gadgets. Bridget Lancaster cooks with Christopher Kimball.
13	"Diner Favorites"	November 29, 2008
Recipes for short-order home fries and fluffy diner-style cheese omelet. Featuring an Equipment Review covering cast-iron skillets and a Taste Test on frozen orange juice concentrate.

== Season 2 (2009) ==
No.	Title	Original release date
14	"Old-Fashioned Roast Beef Dinner"	September 5, 2009
Recipes for classic roast beef and gravy, and perfect poppers. Featuring an Equipment Review covering plastic wrap. This episode was hosted by Bridget Lancaster along with Christopher Kimball.
15	"Pucker-Up Pies"	September 12, 2009
Recipes for mile-high lemon meringue pie and icebox key lime pie. Featuring an Equipment Review covering stand mixers. This episode is the first regular appearance of Erin McMurrer.
16	"Rise and Shine"	September 19, 2009
Recipes for ultimate cinnamon buns and better-than-the-box pancake mix. Featuring an Equipment Review covering stovetop griddles and a Tasting Lab on maple and pancake syrup.
17	"Surefire Seafood"	September 26, 2009
Recipes for wood-grilled salmon and baked stuffed shrimp. Featuring a Tasting Lab on tartar sauce.
18	"Super Fudgy Cake"	October 3, 2009
A recipe for tunnel of fudge cake. Featuring a Tasting Lab on boxed brownie mixes and top tips for oven baking. This episode was hosted by Bridget Lancaster along with Christopher Kimball.
19	"Chili and Cornbread"	October 10, 2009
Recipes for chili con carne and Southern-style skillet cornbread. Featuring an Equipment Review covering can openers. This episode was hosted by Bridget Lancaster along with Christopher Kimball.
20	"Southern BBQ"	October 17, 2009
Recipes for Alabama BBQ chicken and tangy apple-cabbage slaw. Featuring a Tasting Lab on iced tea. This episode was hosted by Bridget Lancaster along with Christopher Kimball, with Tim Pennell as a call-in guest.
21	"Fail-Safe Thanksgiving"	October 24, 2009
Recipes for old-fashioned roast turkey with gravy, and garlic mashed potatoes. Featuring a Tasting Lab on frozen dinner rolls and tips for how to buy a chef's knife. This episode was hosted by Bridget Lancaster along with Christopher Kimball.
22	"Fried Chicken"	October 31, 2009
Recipes for creole fried chicken and grilled corn on the cob. Featuring an Equipment Review covering dutch ovens, a Tasting Lab on microwave popcorn, and tips for fool-proof deep frying. This episode was hosted by Bridget Lancaster along with Christopher Kimball.
23	"Texas Beef Barbecue"	November 7, 2009
Recipes for shredded barbecued beef and ranch potato salad. Featuring an Equipment Review covering ice cream makers and a Tasting Lab on whole wheat bread. This episode was hosted by Bridget Lancaster along with Christopher Kimball.
24	"Stovetop Desserts"	November 14, 2009
Recipes for skillet peach cobbler and blueberry grunt. Featuring a Tasting Lab on fresh lemon substitutes.
25	"Perfect Pork"	November 21, 2009
Recipes for grilled mustard-glazed pork loin and cider-braised pork chops. Featuring a Tasting Lab on coarse-grain mustard and tips for prepping a gas grill.
26	"Historical Cakes"	November 28, 2009
Recipes for red velvet cake with cream cheese frosting and cold oven pound cake. Featuring an Equipment Review covering loaf pans and tips for perfectly baked cakes.

== Season 3 (2010) ==
No.	Title	Original release date
27	"Two Perfect Pies"	September 4, 2010
Recipes for shaker lemon pie and icebox strawberry pie. Featuring an Equipment Review covering pie plates and a Tasting Lab on low-fat strawberry yogurt.
28	"Family Supper"	September 11, 2010
Recipes for glazed meatloaf and crunchy potato wedges. Featuring an Equipment Review covering dish towels and tips for avoiding common cooking mistakes. This episode was hosted by Bridget Lancaster only.
29	"Old Fashioned Pork"	September 18, 2010
Recipes for pan-fried pork chops, slow cooker pork pot roast, and mashed sweet potatoes. Featuring an Equipment Corner covering vacuum sealers.
30	"Southern Comfort Food"	September 25, 2010
Recipes for sweet corn spoonbread and batter-fried chicken. Featuring a Tasting Lab on bottled ice teas with lemon.
31	"Beef Meets Grill"	October 2, 2010
Recipes for classic steak sauce, char-grilled steaks, and Texas barbecued beef ribs. Featuring an Equipment Review covering paper plates.
32	"Everybody Loves Chocolate"	October 9, 2010
Recipes for Texas sheet cake and chocolate cream cupcakes. Featuring a Tasting Lab on hot cocoa.
33	"Hearty Italian Meals"	October 16, 2010
Recipes for Italian pot roast and baked manicotti with meat sauce. Featuring an Equipment Review covering pizza wheels.
34	"Northern Cookout"	October 23, 2010
Recipes for Cornell chicken, Syracuse salt potatoes, and Juicy Lucy burgers. Featuring a Tasting Lab on bottled barbecue sauce.
35	"The Chemistry of Cakes"	October 30, 2010
Recipes for angel food cake and lemon pudding cake. Featuring an Equipment Review covering hand-held mixers and tube pans.
36	"Southwestern Suppers"	November 6, 2010
Recipes for easy chicken tacos and beef enchiladas. Featuring a Tasting Lab on canned baked beans and top freezer tricks.
37	"Breakfast Showstoppers"	November 13, 2010
Recipes for monkey bread and Dutch baby. Featuring an Equipment Review covering inexpensive 4-slice toasters and a Tasting Lab on decaffeinated coffees.
38	"Chicken Two Ways"	November 20, 2010
Recipes for roast lemon chicken and skillet chicken Parmesan. Featuring a Tasting Lab on canned chicken noodle soup and tips for cooking with chicken.
39	"Ultimate Ham Dinner"	November 27, 2010
Recipes for cider-baked ham, Delmonico potatoes, and cornmeal biscuits. Featuring an Equipment Review covering electric knives.

== Season 4 (2011–2012) ==
No.	Title	Original release date
40	"Roast Beef Dinner"	September 10, 2011
Recipes for herbed roast beef and whipped potatoes. Featuring an Equipment Review covering multi-event kitchen timers and tips for top sirloin cooking with salt.
41	"Icebox Desserts"	September 17, 2011
Recipes for French silk chocolate pie and lemon icebox cheesecake. Featuring a Tasting Lab on chocolate ice cream.
42	"Fancy Chicken"	September 24, 2011
Recipes for foolproof chicken cordon bleu and apple cider chicken. Featuring a Tasting Lab on black forest deli ham and tips for how to cut a whole chicken.
43	"Tropical Barbecue"	October 1, 2011
Recipes for Huli Huli chicken and Chinese-style barbecued ribs. Featuring an Equipment Review covering pastry brushes and a Tasting Lab on reduced-fat potato chips.
44	"Bayou Classics"	October 15, 2011
Recipes for gumbo and lane cake. Featuring a Tasting Lab on long-grain rice.
45	"Retro Desserts"	October 22, 2011
Recipes for banana pudding and Chiffon cake. Featuring an Equipment Review covering fine-mesh strainers.
46	"Family Favorites"	October 29, 2011
Recipes for Swiss steak and baked potato fans. Featuring an Equipment Review covering immersion blenders and a Tasting Lab on tomato paste.
47	"Not Just for Kids"	November 5, 2011
Recipes for chicken nuggets, and macaroni and cheese with tomatoes. Featuring an Equipment Review covering broiler-safe baking dishes and a Tasting Lab on yellow mustard.
48	"Fried Chicken and Biscuits"	November 12, 2011
Recipes for Nashville hot fried chicken and cat head biscuits. Featuring an Equipment Review covering spider skimmers and a Tasting Lab on whole Kosher dill pickles.
49	"Road Food at Home"	January 7, 2012
Recipes for slow cooker BBQ beef brisket and beer-battered onion rings. Featuring an Equipment Review covering slow cookers.
50	"Autumn Desserts"	November 19, 2011
Recipes for baked apple dumplings and old-fashioned pecan pie. Featuring an Equipment Review covering cake carriers.
51	"Grilling"	December 31, 2011
Recipes for grilled thin-cut pork chops, grilled potato hobo packs, and grilled butterflied lemon chicken. Featuring an Equipment Review covering grill tongs.
52	"St. Louis Cooking"	January 14, 2012
Recipes for St. Louis-style pizza and St. Louis-style BBQ pork steaks. Featuring a Tasting Lab on supermarket pepperoni.

== Season 5 (2012) ==
No.	Title	Original release date
53	"Hearty Autumn Dinner"	September 15, 2012
Recipes for smothered pork chops and apple fritters. Featuring a Tasting Lab on breakfast sausage patties.
54	"Breakfast Breads"	September 22, 2012
Recipes for morning buns and Morning Glory muffins. Featuring an Equipment Review covering muffin tins and a Tasting Lab on pancake mix.
55	"Dixie Chicken"	September 29, 2012
Recipes for Moravian chicken pie and chicken and slicks.
56	"Italian Favorites Revisited"	October 6, 2012
Recipes for slow-cooker meatballs and marinara, and spinach lasagna. Featuring an Equipment Review covering oven mitts and a Tasting Lab on jarred spaghetti sauce.
57	"Simple Summer Supper"	October 13, 2012
Recipes for grilled steakhouse steak tips and dill potato salad. Featuring an Equipment Review covering one-handed pepper grinders.
58	"Fun Modern Cakes"	October 20, 2012
Recipes for strawberry dream cake and chocolate eclair cake. Featuring an Equipment Review covering cake lifters and a Tasting Lab on milk chocolate.
59	"Upscale Meat and Potatoes"	October 27, 2012
Recipes for herb-crusted beef tenderloin and duchess potatoes. Featuring an Equipment Review covering fondue pots.
60	"Thrill of the Grill"	November 3, 2012
Recipes for South Carolina pulled pork and grilled chicken wings. Featuring an Equipment Review covering portable charcoal grills and a Tasting Lab on ice cream bars.
61	"Forgotten Cookies"	November 10, 2012
Recipes for melting moments and fairy gingerbread cookies. Featuring an Equipment Review covering toasters.
62	"Super-Easy Comfort Food"	November 17, 2012
Recipes for chuck roast in foil and slow-cooker French onion soup. Featuring an Equipment Review covering inexpensive stockpots.
63	"Chicken for Everyone!"	November 24, 2012
Recipes for chicken chimichangas and one-pan roast chicken with root vegetables. Featuring an Equipment Review covering kitchen shears and a Tasting Lab on tomato soup.
64	"Great American Cookout"	December 1, 2012
Recipes for Baltimore pit beef and barbecued country-style ribs. Featuring a Tasting Lab on ketchup.
65	"Dinner at the Diner"	December 8, 2012
Recipes for patty melts and crispy potato tots. Featuring an Equipment Review covering travel mugs and a Tasting Lab on macaroni and cheese.

== Season 6 (2013) ==
No.	Title	Original release date
66	"Picnic in the Country"	September 7, 2013
Recipes for honey fried chicken and Amish potato salad. Featuring an Equipment Corner covering cutting boards and tips for quick homemade chicken broth.
67	"Company's Coming"	September 14, 2013
Recipes for crown roast of pork and parmesan-crusted asparagus. Featuring an Equipment Review covering measuring spoons and tips for food safety.
68	"Old-Fashioned Sweet Endings"	September 21, 2013
Recipes for peaches and cream pie, and cream cheese pound cake. Featuring an Equipment Review covering rolling pins and a Tasting Lab on ready-made pie crusts.
69	"Great American Meat and Potatoes"	September 28, 2013
Recipes for Atlanta brisket and roasted salt-and-vinegar potatoes. Featuring a Tasting Lab on steak sauce.
70	"Italian Made Easy"	October 5, 2013
Recipes for grandma pizza and slow-cooker minestrone. Featuring a Tasting Lab on supermarket tortellini.
71	"Backyard Barbecue"	October 12, 2013
Recipes for barbecued pulled chicken and South Dakota corncob-smoked ribs. Featuring an Equipment Review covering electric charcoal starters and a Tasting Lab on ice cream cones.
72	"Homespun Breakfast Treats"	October 19, 2013
Recipes for fluffy cornmeal pancakes and English muffin bread. Featuring a Tasting Lab on multigrain bread.
73	"Irish Country Cooking"	October 26, 2013
Recipes for Guinness beef stew and brown soda bread. Featuring an Equipment Review covering all-purpose whisks.
74	"Sweet on Texas"	November 2, 2013
Recipes for tres leches cake and magic chocolate flan cake. Featuring a Tasting Lab on sweetened condensed milk.
75	"Get your Chile Fix"	November 9, 2013
Recipes for green chile cheeseburgers and five-alarm chili. Featuring a Tasting Lab on mayonnaise.
76	"Dessert on Bourbon Street"	September 28, 2013
Recipes for New Orleans bourbon bread pudding and beignets. Featuring an Equipment Review covering confectioners' sugar shakers and a Tasting Lab on grits.
77	"Favorites with a Chinese Accent"	November 16, 2013
Recipes for Chinese-style glazed pork tenderloin and Chinese chicken salad. Featuring an Equipment Review covering grill pans and a Tasting Lab on ready rice.
78	"Comfort Food Classics"	November 23, 2013
Recipes for meatloaf with mushroom gravy and herb roast chicken. Featuring an Equipment Review covering inexpensive 12-inch skillets.

== Season 7 (2014) ==
No.	Title	Original release date
79	"Short Order Breakfast Classics"	August 30, 2014
Recipes for quicker cinnamon buns and "impossible" ham-and-cheese pie. Featuring a Tasting Lab on frozen orange juice concentrate.
80	"Dressing Up Meat and Potatoes"	September 6, 2014
Recipes for holiday strip roast, salsa verde, and olive oil potato gratin. Featuring a Tasting Lab on country hams.
81	"Black and White Desserts"	September 13, 2014
Recipes for chocolate angel pie, and black and white cookies. Featuring an Equipment Review covering cookie sheets and a Tasting Lab on processed egg whites.
82	"Fresh and Spicy Spins to Roast Pork and Tacos"	September 20, 2014
Recipes for pork pernil and California fish tacos. Featuring a Tasting Lab on jarred medium salsa.
83	"Old-Fashioned Sunday Suppers"	September 27, 2014
Recipes for skillet-roasted chicken and stuffing, and pork chops with vinegar peppers. Featuring an Equipment Review covering food storage gadgets.
84	"Steakhouse Specials Off the Grill"	October 4, 2014
Recipes for grilled cowboy-cut ribeyes and grilled Caesar salad. Featuring an Equipment Review covering salad spinners.
85	"Dinner From the Prairie"	October 11, 2014
Recipes for milk-can supper and Dakota bread. Featuring an Equipment Review covering roasting pans.
86	"Memphis Ribs and Pretzel Salad"	October 18, 2014
Recipes for Memphis-style wet ribs for a crowd and strawberry pretzel salad. Featuring a Tasting Lab on blue cheese dressing.
87	"Sweet Endings from the Icebox"	October 25, 2014
Recipes for Italian cream cake and summer berry pudding. Featuring an Equipment Review covering round cake pans.
88	"New Orleans Shrimp and Creamy Grits"	November 1, 2014
Recipes for New Orleans barbecue shrimp and creamy cheese grits. Featuring a Tasting Lab on pepper jack cheese.
89	"Great Grilled Chicken and Texas Potato Salad"	November 8, 2014
Recipes for grilled chicken leg quarters with lime dressing, Texas potato salad, and hard-cooked eggs. Featuring an Equipment Review covering aprons.
90	"Oklahoma Onion Burgers and Louisiana Meat Pies"	November 15, 2014
Recipes for Oklahoma fried onion burgers and Natchitoches meat pies. Featuring a Tasting Lab on frozen straight-cut French fries.
91	"Colorado Chili and Slow-Cooker Baked Ziti"	November 22, 2014
Recipes for Colorado green chili and slow-cooker baked ziti. Featuring an Equipment Review covering small slow cookers and a Tasting Lab on egg noodles.

== Season 8 (2015) ==
Season 8 is hosted by Christopher Kimball. Test cooks Bridget Lancaster, Julia Collin Davison, and Erin McMurrer demonstrate recipes. Jack Bishop is in charge of the Tasting Lab and Adam Ried features new products during the Equipment Review.

No.	Title	Original release date
92	"American Classics with a Twist"	September 13, 2015
Recipes for frosted meatloaf and apple pie with cheddar cheese crust. Featuring a Tasting Lab on frozen pizzas.
93	"Muffins and Doughnuts Get a Makeover"	September 20, 2015
Recipes for muffin tin doughnuts and whole-wheat blueberry muffins. Featuring an Equipment Review covering top pod coffee makers and a Tasting Lab on grapefruit juice.
94	"A Hearty Fall Dinner"	September 27, 2015
Recipes for skillet roast chicken and potatoes, secret ingredient biscuits, and brussels sprout salad. Featuring an Equipment Review covering wine aerating and a Tasting Lab on brown mustard.
95	"Grilled and Smoked"	October 4, 2015
Recipes for barbecued burnt ends and smoky potato salad. Featuring an Equipment Review covering grill spatulas and a Tasting Lab on lemonade.
96	"Pasta for Every Palate"	October 11, 2015
Recipes for pork ragu and pasta with roasted garlic sauce, arugula, and walnuts. Featuring an Equipment Review covering dish towels.
97	"Fried Chicken and Grilled Peppers"	October 18, 2015
Recipes for Latin fried chicken and perfect grill-roasted peppers. Featuring an Equipment Review covering deep fry/candy thermometers and a Tasting Lab on green salsa.
98	"All-American Sweet Dough Desserts"	October 25, 2015
Recipes for Dakota peach kuchen and kolaches. Featuring a Tasting Lab on peach jam.
99	"Break Out the Bourbon"	November 1, 2015
Recipes for smoked bourbon chicken and sweet potato pie. Featuring an Equipment Review covering liquid dish soap.
100	"Southern Comfort"	November 8, 2015
Recipes for delta hot tamales and Charleston shrimp perloo. Featuring tips to take the bite out of garlic.
101	"Simplified Showstoppers"	November 15, 2015
Recipes for one-pan prime rib, roasted vegetables, and blitz torte. Featuring a Tasting Lab on frozen dinner rolls.
102	"Grilled Salmon and Stuffed Tomatoes"	November 22, 2015
Recipes for grilled salmon steaks with lemon-caper sauce and stuffed tomatoes. Featuring an Equipment Review covering tomato coring tools and a Tasting Lab on breadcrumbs.
103	"Bringing Home Tex-Mex Favorites"	November 29, 2015
Recipes for Tex-Mex cheese enchiladas and huevos rancheros. Featuring an Equipment Review covering tortilla keepers and a Tasting Lab on corn tortillas.
104	"Chinese Comes Home"	December 6, 2015
Recipes for chicken chow mein and slow-cooker Chinese barbecued pork. Featuring an Equipment Review covering slow cookers.

== Season 9 (2016) ==
Season 9 is the final season hosted by Christopher Kimball. Test cooks Bridget Lancaster, Julia Collin Davison, Erin McMurrer, Ashley Moore, and Christie Morrison demonstrate recipes. Jack Bishop is in charge of the Tasting Lab and Adam Ried features new products during the Equipment Review.

No.	Title	Original release date
105	"Badger State Favorites"	August 27, 2016
Recipes for spicy cheese bread and old-fashioned vanilla frozen custard. Featuring a Tasting Lab on sharp cheddar cheese.
106	"Picnic Game Changers"	September 3, 2016
Recipes for ranch fried chicken and husk-grilled corn. Featuring an Equipment Review covering potholders and tips for five easy tuna salads.
107	"Sweet Indulgences"	September 10, 2016
Recipes for milk chocolate cheese cake and Swiss hazelnut cake. Featuring an Equipment Review covering cake stands.
108	"Surf and Turf Goes Regional"	September 17, 2016
Recipes for cedar-planked salmon with cucumber yogurt sauce, lemon and herb red potato salad, and grilled sugar steak. Featuring an Equipment Review covering water bottles.
109	"Big Family Breakfast"	September 24, 2016
Recipes for mixed berry scones and breakfast pizza. Featuring an Equipment Review covering pizza cutters and a Tasting Lab on honey.
110	"A Taste of Tennessee"	October 1, 2016
Recipes for Tennessee pulled pork sandwiches on hoecakes and French coconut pie. Featuring a Tasting Lab on shredded coconut.
111	"The Devil Made Me Do It"	October 8, 2016
Recipes for grilled chicken diavolo and deviled beef short ribs. Featuring an Equipment Review covering insulated food carriers and a Tasting Lab on hard cider.
112	"Latin Heat"	October 15, 2016
Recipes for puffy tacos and chicken chilaquiles. Featuring an Equipment Review covering dish drying racks and a Tasting Lab on tortilla chips.
113	"All Wrapped Up"	October 22, 2016
Recipes for bacon-wrapped meatloaf and chicken baked in foil with sweet potato and radish. Featuring an Equipment Review covering vacuum sealers and a Tasting Lab on salted butter.
114	"Southern Stews"	October 29, 2016
Recipes for Brunswick stew, and shrimp and grits. Featuring an Equipment Review covering shrimp tools and a Tasting Lab on brown rice.
115	"Biting Into the Big Easy"	November 5, 2016
Recipes for pork grillades and New Orleans muffulettas. Featuring an Equipment Review covering slicing knives and a Tasting Lab on Creole seasoning.
116	"Prime Rib with All the Fixings"	November 12, 2016
Recipes for prime rib and potatoes with red wine-orange sauce and roasted green beans with goat cheese and hazelnuts. Featuring an Equipment Review covering roasting racks and tips for green goddess dressing.
117	"Big Flavors from Little Italy"	November 19, 2016
Recipes for zeppoles and pasta with mushroom sauce. Featuring an Equipment Review covering splatter screens, a Tasting Lab on shredded parmesan, and tips for slow-cooker chicken stock.

== Season 10 (2017) ==
Season 10 is the first season hosted by Bridget Lancaster and Julia Collin Davison. Test cooks Bryan Roof, Christie Morrison, and Ashley Moore demonstrate recipes. Jack Bishop is in charge of the Tasting Lab and Adam Ried features new products during the Equipment Review.

No.	Title	Original release date
118	"Pork and Pierogi"	August 26, 2017
Recipes for cider-braised pork roast and authentic Pittsburgh-style potato-cheddar pierogi. Featuring a Tasting Lab on sauerkraut.
119	"Spicy and Sour for Supper"	September 2, 2017
Recipes for arroz con pollo and sour orange pie. Featuring a Tasting Lab on supermarket whipped toppings.
120	"Smoky Barbecue Favorites"	September 9, 2017
Recipes for Texas thick cut smoked pork chops and backyard barbecue beans. Featuring an Equipment Review covering dry measuring cups.
121	"Smothered and Dowdied"	September 16, 2017
Recipes for Southern-style smothered chicken and apple pandowdy. Featuring an Equipment Review covering kitchen timers.
122	"BBQ Thighs and Fried Peach Pies"	September 23, 2017
Recipes for barbecued chicken thighs and fried peach pies. Featuring a Tasting Lab on bagged popcorn.
123	"Ribs and Mashed Potatoes Revisited"	September 30, 2017
Recipes for slow-cooker Memphis-style wet ribs and mashed potato cakes. Featuring a Tasting Lab on apple cider vinegar.
124	"Bourbon and Broccoli Hit the Grill"	October 7, 2017
Recipes for grilled bourbon steaks and grilled broccoli with lemon and parmesan. Featuring an Equipment Review covering digital thermometers and a Tasting Lab on dill pickle spears.
125	"Straight from So-Cal"	October 14, 2017
Recipes for citrus-braised pork tacos and So-Cal churros. Featuring an Equipment Review covering piping sets and a Tasting Lab on mild jarred red salsa.
126	"Southern Discoveries"	October 21, 2017
Recipes for South Carolina smoked fresh ham and smashed potato salad. Featuring an Equipment Review covering potato mashers and a Tasting Lab on spiral-sliced ham.
127	"Cast Iron Comforts"	October 28, 2017
Recipes for cast-iron skillet pizza margherita and cast-iron skillet chocolate chip cookie. Featuring an Equipment Review covering cast-iron skillets.
128	"Plenty of Garlic and Parm"	November 4, 2017
Recipes for garlic-fried chicken and crispy parmesan potatoes. Featuring an Equipment Review covering Dutch ovens.
129	"When Only Chocolate Will Do"	November 11, 2017
Recipes for Mississippi mud pie and whoopie pies. Featuring an Equipment Review covering small food processors.
130	"The Italian-American Kitchen"	November 18, 2017
Recipes for fluffy baked polenta with red sauce and pasta with sausage ragu. Featuring a Tasting Lab on fettucine.

== Season 11 (2018) ==
Season 11 is the first season to be filmed at the new farmhouse set at America's Test Kitchen's test facility in Boston, Massachusetts.

No.	Title	Original release date
131	"Ultimate Comfort Foods"	August 25, 2018
Recipes for Wellesley fudge cake, and chicken and pastry. Featuring an Equipment Review covering immersion blenders.
132	"Ballpark Classics"	September 1, 2018
Recipes for grilled sausages with bell peppers and onions, and ballpark pretzels. Featuring an Equipment Review covering paper plates a Tasting Lab on whole wheat bread.
133	"A Trip to Tarheel Country"	September 8, 2018
Recipes for North Carolina dipped fried chicken and North Carolina lemon pie. Featuring a Tasting Lab on chocolate ice cream.
134	"New Recipes for the Grill"	September 15, 2018
Recipes for grill-fried chicken wings and grilled pork burgers. Featuring an Equipment Review covering ice packs and a Tasting Lab on barbecue sauce.
135	"Spaghetti House Classics"	September 22, 2018
Recipes for hearty beef lasagna and chicken scarpariello. Featuring a Tasting Lab on block mozzarella.
136	"Tex-Mex Favorites"	September 29, 2018
Recipes for flank steak in adobo and Texas breakfast tacos. Featuring an Equipment Review covering inexpensive blenders.
137	"Pacific Northwest Supper"	October 6, 2018
Recipes for Oregon blackberry pie and roasted salmon with broccoli and red potatoes. Featuring a Tasting Lab on extra sharp cheddar cheese.
138	"Summer Steak and Salad"	October 13, 2018
Recipes for grilled thick-cut porterhouse steaks and Caesar green beans. Featuring an Equipment Review covering paring knives and a Tasting Lab on crumbled blue cheese.
139	"Re-imagining Italian-American Classics"	October 20, 2018
Recipes for Detroit style pizza and fettuccine with butter and cheese. Featuring an Equipment Review covering rasp-style graters.
140	"Southern Specialties"	October 27, 2018
Recipes for Tennessee pulled turkey sandwiches and North Carolina fish stew. Featuring an Equipment Review covering paper towels.
141	"Tri-state Treats"	November 3, 2018
Recipes for New Jersey crumb buns and cheese blintzes with raspberry sauce. Featuring an Equipment Review covering non-stick skillets.
142	"Holiday Roast and Potatoes"	November 10, 2018
Recipes for boneless rib roast with Yorkshire pudding and Lighthouse Inn potatoes. Featuring a Tasting Lab on black tea.
143	"Pub-Style Seafood"	November 17, 2018
Recipes for fish and chips, and shrimp burgers. Featuring a Tasting Lab on hamburger buns.

== Season 12 (2019) ==
No.	Title	Original release date
144	"BBQ Brisket and Fritters"	August 26, 2019
A recipe for Texas barbecue brisket. Featuring an Equipment Review covering coolers.
145	"Italian Comfort Food Classics"	August 31, 2019
Recipes for Chicago thin-crust pizza with homemade Italian sausage and pasta e fagioli. Featuring a Tasting Lab on jarred pasta sauce.
146	"Tacos Two Ways"	September 7, 2019
Recipes for smoked fish tacos and grilled steak fajitas. Featuring an Equipment Review covering chimney starters.
147	"Beef, Dressed Up"	September 14, 2019
Recipes for spice-crusted steaks and grilled bacon burgers with caramelized onion. Featuring an Equipment Review covering electric griddles and a Tasting Lab on supermarket bacon.
148	"Regional Italian-American Favorites"	September 21, 2019
Recipes for prosciutto bread with provolone and drop meatballs. Featuring a Tasting Lab on provolone.
149	"Aloha State Favorites"	September 28, 2019
Recipes for Hawaiian-style fried chicken and Hawaiian macaroni salad. Featuring an Equipment Review covering plastic wrap and a Tasting Lab on potato chips.
150	"Chicken and Cornbread"	October 5, 2019
Recipes for cast iron baked chicken and blueberry cornbread with honey butter. Featuring a Tasting Lab on hot sauce.
151	"The Perfect Cake"	October 12, 2019
A recipe for blueberry jam cake. Featuring an Equipment Review covering long-slot toasters.
152	"Roast Beef and Potatoes"	October 19, 2019
Recipes for classic roast beef tenderloin and Lyonnaise potatoes. Featuring an Equipment Review covering kitchen tongs.
153	"Pork and Pie"	October 26, 2019
Recipes for Monroe County-style pork chops and coconut cream pie. Featuring an Equipment Review covering pie servers.
154	"Holiday Feast"	November 2, 2019
Recipes for crumb-crusted rack of lamb and brussels sprout gratin. Featuring an Equipment Review covering electric knives.
155	"A Trip to the Big Easy"	November 9, 2019
Recipes for shrimp po' boys and chicken sauce piquant. Featuring a Tasting Lab on mail-order king cakes.
156	"Comfort Food Done Right"	November 16, 2019
Recipes for double-crust chicken pot pie and cowboy cookies. Featuring a Tasting Lab on creamy peanut butter.

== Season 13 (2020) ==
No.	Title	Original release date
157	"Regional Seafood Specialties"	September 12, 2020
Recipes for Monterey Bay cioppino and shrimp mozambique. Featuring an Equipment Review covering can openers.
158	"Taste of Summer"	September 19, 2020
Recipes for grilled flank steak with basil dressing and fresh tomato oil galette. Featuring an Equipment Review covering herb keepers.
159	"Beef Kebabs and Cheese Bread"	September 26, 2020
Recipes for shashlik-style beef kebabs and adjaruli khachapuri. Featuring a Tasting Lab on ground cumin.
160	"Grilled Chicken, Two Ways"	October 3, 2020
Recipes for grilled jerk chicken and smoked chicken wings. Featuring an Equipment Review covering grill brushes.
161	"Tacos Two Ways"	October 10, 2020
Recipes for pork carnitas and shrimp tacos. Featuring a Tasting Lab on lard.
162	"Bread, Cheese and Meat Can't Be Beat"	October 17, 2020
Recipes for sliders and croque monsieur. Featuring a Tasting Lab on ketchup.
163	"Herbaceous Chicken and Potatoes"	October 24, 2020
Recipes for Greek chicken and crushed red potatoes with garlic and herbs. Featuring an Equipment Review covering liquid measuring cups and a Tasting Lab on crumbled feta.
164	"Italian Comfort Food"	October 31, 2020
Recipes for cheesy stuffed shells and eggplant pecorino. Featuring an Equipment Review covering 13-by-9-inch broiler-safe baking dishes.
165	"Chicken and Biscuits"	November 7, 2020
Recipes for one-batch fried chicken and North Carolina cheese biscuits. Featuring a Tasting Lab on strawberry spreads.
166	"Pennsylvania Dutch Country"	November 14, 2020
Recipes for Pennsylvania Dutch apple pie and Amish cinnamon bread. Featuring a Tasting Lab on vanilla ice cream.
167	"Motor City Favorites"	November 21, 2020
Recipes for bottom round roast beef with zip-style sauce and almond boneless chicken. Featuring an Equipment Review covering measuring spoons.
168	"Never Enough Chocolate"	November 28, 2020
Recipes for triple-chocolate sticky buns, and thin and crispy chocolate chip cookies. Featuring a Tasting Lab on milk chocolate.
169	"Spring Feast"	December 5, 2020
Recipes for slow-roasted fresh ham and gooey butter cake bars. Featuring an Equipment Review covering inexpensive blenders.

== Season 14 (2021) ==
No.	Title	Original release date
170	"Fried Bites"	September 18, 2021
Recipes for popcorn chicken, gobi manchurian, and crispy vegetable fritters. Featuring an Equipment Review covering electric deep fryers.
171	"Roast Chicken and Salad"	September 25, 2021
Recipes for green goddess roast chicken; perfect pesto; and potato, green bean, and tomato salad.
172	"Summer Berry Desserts"	October 2, 2021
Recipes for mixed berry buckle, strawberry cheesecake bars, and strawberry-basil compote.
173	"Carne Guisada and Enchiladas"	October 9, 2021
Recipes for carne guisada and easy green chili chicken enchiladas. Featuring an Equipment Review covering oven mitts.
174	"One-Pot Meals"	October 16, 2021
Recipes for one-pot chicken jardinière and one-pan Mediterranean shrimp. Featuring an Equipment Review covering bird's beak paring knives.
175	"Italian-American Comforts"	October 23, 2021
Recipes for Italian meatloaf, chicken scampi, and asparagus baked in foil with parmesan and thyme. Featuring a Tasting Lab on garlic substitutes.
176	"Regional Sandwich Roundup"	October 30, 2021
Recipes for crispy Iowa skinny, Boogaloo Wonderland sandwiches, and a St. Paul sandwich. Featuring an Equipment Review covering 12-inch nonstick skillets.
177	"Thanksgiving Simplified"	November 6, 2021
Recipes for one-pan turkey breast and stuffing, roasted butternut squash with apple, and pear-cranberry chutney.
178	"Paprikash and Stroganoff"	November 13, 2021
Recipes for chicken paprikash, buttered spaetzle, and ground beef stroganoff. Featuring an Equipment Review covering wooden spoons.
179	"Pork, Peaches and Potatoes"	November 20, 2021
Recipes for bacon-wrapped pork roast with peach sauce, Texas potato pancakes, and easy homemade mayonnaise. Featuring an Equipment Review covering graters.
180	"French Fare"	December 4, 2021
Recipes for easy steak frites and French onion soup. Featuring an Equipment Review covering braisers.
181	"Chicken Soup and Cheesy Bread"	December 11, 2021
Recipes for old-fashioned chicken noodle soup, beer-batter cheese bread, make-ahead hot chocolate, and spinach salad with gorgonzola and pear. Featuring a Tasting Lab on broth.
182	"Elegant and Orange"	December 18, 2021
Recipes for slow-roasted salmon with chives and lemon, and Clementine cake.

== Season 15 (2022) ==
No.	Title	Original release date
183	"Cast Iron Everything"	August 20, 2022
Recipes for Japanese steakhouse steak and vegetables; charred cherry tomatoes with bell peppers and mozzarella. Review of cast iron skillets.
184	"New England for Everyone"	August 27, 2022
Recipes for clam chowder; hot buttered lobster rolls. Review of inexpensive blenders.
185	"Low Country Party"	September 3, 2022
Recipes for okra and shrimp soup; pickled shrimp. Review of lightweight dutch ovens.
186	"Midwestern Favorites"	September 10, 2022
Recipes for tator tot hotdish; buckeye candies; butter burgers. Review of corn strippers.
187	"Fried Chicken and Biscuits"	September 17, 2022
Recipes for lard-fried chicken; BLT salad; blueberry biscuits. Taste test of regional barbeque potato chips.
188	"Thai Comforts"	September 24, 2022
Recipes for khao man gai; pad gra prow.
189	"Seafood Two Ways"	October 1, 2022
Recipes for seafood fra diavolo; roasted garlic-parmesan bread; salmon picatta.
190	"Two Tastes from the Bay Area"	October 8, 2022
Recipes for sinigang; neorm sach moan (chicken salad with cabbage and fish sauce).
191	"Never Enough Chocolate"	October 15, 2022
Recipes for Chocolate Babka; Chocolate Fudge. Taste test of Espresso Powder.
192	"Pennsylvanian Melting Pot"	October 22, 2022
Recipes for Transylvanian Goulash; Beans and Greens; Shredded Swiss Chard Salad with Prosciutto, Basil, and Blue Cheese. All About Heirloom Beans.
193	"Cajun Country"	October 29, 2022
Recipes for Cajun Rice Dressing; Stuffed Turkey Wings.
194	"Endless Dessert"	November 5, 2022
Recipes for Banana Pudding Pie; No-Churn Ice Cream. Vanilla 101.
195	"Old New Mexico"	November 12, 2022
Recipes for Gorditas; New Mexico Biscochitos. Review of Tortilla Presses.
196	"Chuck Roast and Potatoes"	November 19, 2022
Recipes for Roasted Beef Chuck with Horseradish-Parsley Sauce; Torn and Fried Potatoes; Creamed Spinach. Review of Kitchen Timers.
197	"Saucy Italian-Inspired Dinners"	November 26, 2022
Recipes for Spaghetti Carbonara; Instant Mashed Potato Gnocchi Al Forno; Fried Artichokes.
198	"Pork Roast and Orange Cake"	December 3, 2022
Recipes for Roast Pork Loin with 40 Cloves of Garlic; Orange Upside-Down Cake. Review of Hand Mixers.
199	"Bar Snacks"	December 10, 2022
Recipes for New England Bar Pizza; Lemon Pepper Wings; Spinach-Artichoke Dip. Review of Grill Pans.
200	"The Cuban Sandwich Show"	December 17, 2022
Recipes for Cuban Sandwich: Cuban Roast Pork with Mojo; Cuban Bread. Must-Have Mustards.

== Season 16 (2023) ==
No.	Title	Original release date
201	"Texas Cookout"	September 9, 2023
Recipes for Texas-styled smoked beef ribs; Charcoal; The History of Self-Rising Flour; Easy Blueberry Cobbler. A visit to El Paso, Texas.
202	"Fish Tacos and Fried Shrimp"	September 16, 2023
Recipes for San Diego fish tacos; Tortilla chips; The History of Shrimping in America. Crispy fried shrimp.
203	"Never Enough Citrus"	September 23, 2023
Recipes for smoked citrus chicken; The Origins of key lime pie. Making key lime pie.
204	"Sisig and Wings"	September 30, 2023
Recipes for sisig and garlic fried rice; The Importance of Knorr's Liquid Seasoning in Filipino cooking; The History of chicken wings as a bar snack. Soy sauce chicken wings.
205	"Hawaiian Melting Pot"	October 7, 2023
Recipes for tuna poke and salmon teriyaki poke; Freeze-dried backpacking meals. Malasadas.
206	"Grilled Lamb and Cheesecake"	October 14, 2023
Recipes for grilled bone-in leg of lamb with charred scallion sauce; Spray mops. La Vina-style cheesecake.
207	"Puerto Rican Classics"	October 21, 2023
Recipes for guanimes con bacalao; Pina coladas; A visit to Puerto Rico. All about salt cod.
208	"A Love Letter to the South"	October 28, 2023
Recipes for pan-fried pork chops with milk gravy; Disposable utensils; Jarred peppers; The Origins of Pimento cheese. Creamy Pimento Mac and cheese.
209	"Biscuits and Chicken"	November 4, 2023
Recipes for butter and lard biscuits; The Debate Between Lard and Shortening; The Benefits of full-sized and mini food processors. Mimosa fried chicken.
210	"Jamaican Feast"	November 11, 2023
Recipes for Jamaican oxtail; Dishes around the world; Countertop compost bins. Jamaican rice and peas.
211	"New Mexican Bounty"	November 18, 2023
Recipes for new Mexican bean and cheese turnovers with green chili; The History of tomato clubs in the USA. Southwestern tomato and corn salad.
212	"Mediterranean Meze"	November 25, 2023
Recipes for mana'eesh za'atar; Baba ghanoush; Different eggplants. Roasted beets with lemon-tahini dressing.
213	"The Best Diner Food"	December 2, 2023
Recipes for diner-style patty melts; Automatic drip coffee makers. The ultimate extra crunchy onion rings.
214	"French-Inspired Dinner"	December 9, 2023
Recipes for trout amandine; How Julia Child made French cuisine accessible in the U.S.; A deep dive into freshwater fish; Bench scrapers. lentilles du puy with spinach and creme fraiche.
215	"Sausages and Salad"	December 16, 2023
Recipes for choucroute garnie; Belgian endive; European-style sausages. Endive salad with oranges and blue cheese.

== Season 17 (2024-2025) ==
No.	Title	Original release date
216	"E01 North Carolina Barbecue"	September 21, 2024
Recipes for North Carolina barbecue; Fire pits for cooking; Lemonade with honey.
217	"E02 Inspired by Japanese Immigrants"	September 28, 2024
Recipes for Seattle chicken teriyaki; Sweet potato salad with cumin; Smoked paprika and almonds; Chef Nobu. Miso black cod.
218	"E03 Southwestern Vegetarian Fare"	September 30, 2024
Recipes for vegetarian chili; International Chili Society; Kansas City-style barbecue sauce. Jalapeño-cheddar scones.
219	"E04 Unexpected Beef and Potatoes"	October 5, 2024
Recipes for smoked prime rib; Foods that started as leftovers; Grill gloves. Torn potato salad with toasted garlic and herb dressing.
220	"E05 A Bold Bunch"	October 7, 2024
Recipes for brunch burgers; Browned butter chocolate chunk muffins. A review of cooking sprays.
221	"E06 Mexican American Comfort Food"	October 12, 2024
Recipes for Quesabirria tacos; A visit to Tucson, Arizona; The origins of the birria craze in the United States. Sopa seca.
222	"E07 Spiced Chicken Dinners"	October 26, 2024
Recipes for kombdi; Cumin-scented chicken; Hot-honey chicken. Honey.
223	"E08 From the Indigenous Pantry"	November 9, 2024
Recipes for cider-braised turkey; Grilled sweet potatoes with maple chili crisp.
224	"E09 Darn Good Desserts"	November 16, 2024
Recipes for s'mores pie; Rolling pins. M&M's cookies.
225	"E10 Short Ribs and Baked Potatoes"	November 23, 2024
Recipes for slow-roasted rare beef short ribs; Beef steaks; A fun baked potato story. Twice-baked potatoes with bacon and cheese.
226	"E11 The Power of Southern Cooking"	November 30, 2024
Recipes for hoppin' john; A visit to Edisto Beach, South Carolina. Orange rolls.
227	"E12 Duck and Dessert with Flair"	December 7, 2024
Recipes for duck breast with port wine-fig sauce; The story of the Tatin sisters and the history of their namesake dish. Tarte tatin.
228	"E13 From the Dairyland"	December 14, 2024
Recipes for cream cheese kringle; How kringle made to Wisconsin from Denmark. Fried cheese curds with ranch dressing.
229	"E14 Southern Staples"	December 21, 2024
Recipes for crispy fried catfish with comeback sauce; Serrated black knifes. Extra-cheesy grits.
230	"E15 Pantry Suppers"	December 28, 2024
Recipes for Okinawan taco rice; Herb and spice blends. Pepperoni French bread pizza.
231	"E16 Snack Cake and Sandwich Cookies"	January 4, 2025
Recipes for carrot snack cakes; Water bottles. Oatmeal creme pies.
232	"E17 Italian Food From Philly"	January 11, 2025
Recipes for Philadelphia pork sandwiches; The origins of Philly tomato pie.
233	"E18 Seafood in a Skillet"	January 18, 2025
Recipes for clams with chorizo; A visit to Basque Block in Idaho; Worcestershire sauce; Shrimp and garlic. Spanish-style sizzling garlic shrimp.
234	"E19 Pork Any Way You Like"	January 25, 2025
Recipes for pork chops with bourbon-cherry sauce and sweet potatoes; South Carolina delicacy. South Carolina barbecue hash.
235	"E20 Crescent City Comforts"	February 1, 2025
Recipes for beef yakamein; Soft coolers. Bourbon chicken.
236	"E21 Skillet Dinners at the Ready"	February 8, 2025
Recipes for chicken and vegetables; Can openers; Hamburger Helper. Cheeseburger mac.
237	"E22 Hearty and Light Pastas"	February 15, 2025
Recipes for sausage lasagna; Canned diced tomatoes; The first industrial pasta factory in America. Spaghetti with garlic and olive oil.
238	"E23 Fresh Mexican-Inspired Dinners"	February 22, 2025
Recipes for ahi-chili tostadas; The differences between lard and shortening; Chorizo's journey from Europe to North America. Skillet corn with Mexican chorizo.
239	"E24 Classic Cookout"	March 1, 2025
Recipes for blueberry cream pie; The rarity of blue foods in nature; Travel utensil sets. Sweet tea-brined fried chicken.
240	"E25 Grilled Short Ribs and Carrot Salad"	March 8, 2025
Recipes for Korean grilled flanken-style short ribs; Vegetable and fruit peelers. Shredded carrot and serrano chili salad.
241	"E26 Celebrating Springtime"	March 15, 2025
Recipes for pomegranate-glazed grilled lamb chops; Radishes. Asparagus salad with radishes.

== Season 18 (2025-26) ==
This is the final season to star test cook Elle Simone before her death on January 5, 2026. Hannah Crowley now takes over the Equipment Corner segment.

No.	Title	Original release date
242	"E01 Georgia Food on My Mind"	September 20, 2025
Recipes for Coastal Georgia Paella and Peach Ripple Ice Cream.
243	"E02 Portuguese Baking"	September 27, 2025
Recipe for Portuguese Pastéis de Nata (Portuguese Custard Tarts). Tasting of canned diced tomatoes.
244	"E03 Italian-American Feast"	October 4, 2025
Recipes for Porchetta Abruzzese and Quick-Braised Broccoli Rabe with Garlic and Anchovies. Talk about pig farming in early North America and hardy greens.
245	"E04 Chips on the Menu"	October 11, 2025
Recipes for Frito Pie and Chocolate-Dipped Potato Chip Cookies. Review of The Best Panini (sandwich) Presses.
246	"E05 Bar Snacks, Perfected"	October 18, 2025
Recipes for Indoor Barbecued Ribs and Air-Fryer Jalapeño Poppers. Taste test of The Best Nonalcoholic Beer.
247	"E06 Southern Sandwiches"	October 25, 2025
Recipes for Pickle-Brined Fried Chicken Sandwich and Chocolate-Marshmallow Sandwich Cookies. Talk about cucumbers and Moon Pies.
248	"E07 Chocolate Baked Delights"	November 1, 2025
Recipes for Double-Chocolate Banana Bread and Chocolate Brownie Cookies. Talk about the history of bananas in the United States and a review of cold-brew coffee makers.
249	"E08 New England Sandwiches"	November 8, 2025
Recipes for Jitto’s-Style Steak Bombs and Cutty’s-Inspired Eggplant Spuckie. Talk about the origins of different sandwich names and review of the world of squash.
250	"E09 Elevated Friendsgiving Mains"	November 15, 2025
Recipes for Slow-Roasted Ducks with Blackberry Sauce Bean Bourguignon. Talk about the best uses for different tinned fish.
251	"E10 Jewish Donuts and Potatoes"	December 6, 2025
Recipes for Sufganiyot (Hanukkah Jelly Doughnuts) and Cast Iron Potato Kugel. Talk about the importance of schmaltz in Jewish cuisine. Review of a lineup of leave-in temperature probes.
252	"E11 Feast of the Seven Fishes"	December 13, 2025
Recipes for Clams Casino and Seafood Risotto with Shrimp, Mussels, and Squid.
253	"E12 Greens for Dinner"	January 3, 2026
Recipes for Pesto Lasagna and Ultimate Caesar Salad. Talk about the history of lasagna. Review of electric wine openers.
254	"E13 Upper Midwest Classics"	January 10, 2026
Recipes for Supper Club Chicken Cordon Bleu and Cornish Pasties.
255	"E14 Inspiring Shrimp Suppers"	January 17, 2026
Recipes for Shrimp with Garlic and Jalapeño Butter and Zephyr Wright–Inspired Shrimp Curry. Review of Swedish dishcloths.
256	"E15 Glazed Pork and Potatoes"	January 24, 2026
Recipes for Honey-Glazed Pork Shoulder and Creamy Potatoes and Leeks. Tasting of Sheep’s-Milk Cheese. History of leek becoming the National vegetable Wales.
257	"E16 Chinese Noodles and Egg Rolls"	January 31, 2026
Recipes for Shanghai Scallion Oil Noodles and American-Style Egg Rolls. The story of Grace Young (author) and her work supporting Chinatowns across America.
258	"E17 When Southern Women Cook"	February 7, 2026
Recipes for Aunt Jule’s Pie and Gullah Lowcountry Red Rice. Taste test of Louisiana-Style Hot Sauces.
259	"E18 Cajun Cooking"	February 14, 2026
Recipes for Rillons and Cajun Meatball Fricassee .
260	"E19 Sweet and Savory Brunch"	April 4, 2026
Recipes for Conchas and Skillet Eggs Sardou.
261	"E20 Mediterranean Burgers and Fritters"	April 11, 2026
Recipes for Lamb Burgers and Sweet Potato Fritters with Feta, Dill, and Cilantro. Grill cookware equipment review.
262	"E21 Tucson Tacos and Tomatillos"	April 18, 2026
Recipes for Mesquite-Grilled Tacos Rasurados. Portable Burner equipment review.
263	"E22 From Texas, With Love"	April 25, 2026
Recipes for Barbecued Chuck Roast and Tomatillo and Bibb Lettuce Salad with Tomatillo Ranch.
264	"E23 Spring Dinner and Dessert"	May 2, 2026
Recipes for Grilled Brined Pork Chops with Garlic-Herb Oil and Rhubarb Shortcakes with Buttermilk Whipped Cream. Review of Ceramic Skillets.
265	"E24 Flavorful Chicken Fonduta"	May 9, 2026
Recipes for Grilled Hilltribe Chicken with Kua Txob and Tomatoes with Fontina Sauce and Cornichon Dressing. Walk through the difference between fondue and fonduta.
266	"E25 Puerto Rican Flavors"	May 16, 2026
Recipes for Alcapurrias and Coquito cocktails. A story of Coco López and piña coladas.
267	"E26 Seafood in a Snap"	May 23, 2026
Recipes for Grilled Mussels and One-Pot Shrimp Piccata Pasta. A story of Texas Shrimp Diva.

== Season 19 (2026-27) ==
No.	Title	Original release date
268	"E01 Hearty Weeknight Comforts"	September 19, 2026
Recipes for Roasted Poblano and White Bean Chili and Baked Pasta e Fagiole. A taste test of vegan mayo.
269	"E02 Mexican for Dinner and Dessert"	September 26, 2026
Recipes for Tacos Árabes (Pueblan Pork Tacos with Chipotle and Yogurt Sauces) and Mini Chocoflanes. Talk about ice cream scoops.
270	"E03 L.A. Sandwiches"	October 3, 2026
Recipes for Little Fish–Inspired Fried Fish Sandwiches and L.A.–Style Chili Cheeseburgers.
271	"E04 Surprising Sheet Pan Suppers"	October 10, 2026
Recipes for Crispy-Creamy Sheet-Pan Macaroni and Cheese and Sheet-Pan Maque Choux. Talk about glass storage containers and history of Alabama Fire Crackers.
272	"E05 Cozy Baking"	October 17, 2026
Recipes for Dollywood-Style Cinnamon Bread and Pumpkin Cream Cheese Blondies. Talk about test kitchen’s favorite mixing bowls.
273	"E06 Dinners with Big, Bold Flavors"	October 24, 2026
Recipes for Roast Chicken with Schug and Fall Panzanella. Talk about sweet potatoes.
274	"E07 Takeout at Home"	October 31, 2026
Recipes for Pepperoni Sheet-Pan Pizza and Meatball Subs. Talk about meat grinders.
275	"E08 Skillet Suppers"	November 7, 2026
Recipes for Skillet Chicken and Rice with Peas and Pancetta and Sweet Potato Shepherd’s Pie. Talk about tart pans.
276	"E09 Two-Hour Turkey and Amish Potato Filling"	November 14, 2026
Recipes for Two-Hour Turkey & Gravy and Amish Potato Filling. Talk about history behind the Cherry Bounce cocktail.
