= America's Test Kitchen: The Next Generation =

- Genre: Cooking competition
- Presented by: Jeannie Mai Jenkins
- Country of origin: United States
- Original language: English
- No. of seasons: 2
- No. of episodes: 20

Production
- Executive producers: Jack Bishop; Madeline Langlieb; Mark Phinney Levine; Jenn Van Persaud; Teri Weideman
- Editors: Jordan Ackerman; John Gehrke

Original release
- Network: Amazon Freevee
- Release: December 9, 2022 – February 10, 2023
- Network: Amazon Prime Video
- Release: April 1, 2025

America's Test Kitchen: The Next Generation is an American cooking competition television series hosted by Jeannie Mai Jenkins. The first season premiered on Amazon Freevee on December 9, 2022. The second season premiered on April 1, 2025, on Amazon Prime Video following the discontinuation of Freevee.

== Summary ==
The series follows 11 home chefs who present their dishes through a series of challenges testing their culinary abilities and personalities. Each episode, the contestants stand before the judges' panel of America's Test Kitchen alums Dan Souza, Elle Simone, Jack Bishop, and Julia Collin Davison, as well as guest judges including Claudette Zepeda, Gesine Bullock-Prado, Jamie Bissonnette, Karen Akunowicz, Kwame Onwuachi, and Nick DiGiovanni. The last cook standing earns a starring role as a new host of America's Test Kitchen, as well as a $100,000 prize to fund their own culinary business, and the opportunity to write their own cookbook.

== Contestants ==
- Antoinette Johnson
- Basil Maqbool
- Brooke Baevsky
- Christina Phan
- Corrina Sepulveda
- Garrett Schlichte
- Jessica Lawson
- Marc Sievers
- Peter Cardoz
- Rachmi Primlani
- Robbie Guevarra

== Production ==
On May 2, 2022, it was reported that America's Test Kitchen: The Next Generation would be a new unscripted competition series for Amazon Freevee, a spinoff of the PBS cooking show America's Test Kitchen. On October 18, 2022, it was announced that Jeannie Mai Jenkins, former co-host of talk show The Real, would host the series. Teri Weideman is the series' showrunner.

Co-executive producers for the series include Jack Bishop, David Lonner, and David Nussbaum.

== Release ==
The trailer for the series was released on November 10, 2022. The 10-episode first season premiered on Amazon Freevee on December 9, 2022, with a new episode released each week through February 10, 2023. The 10-episode second season premiered April 1, 2025, on Amazon Prime Video.
