= Blind taste test =

Market research tool

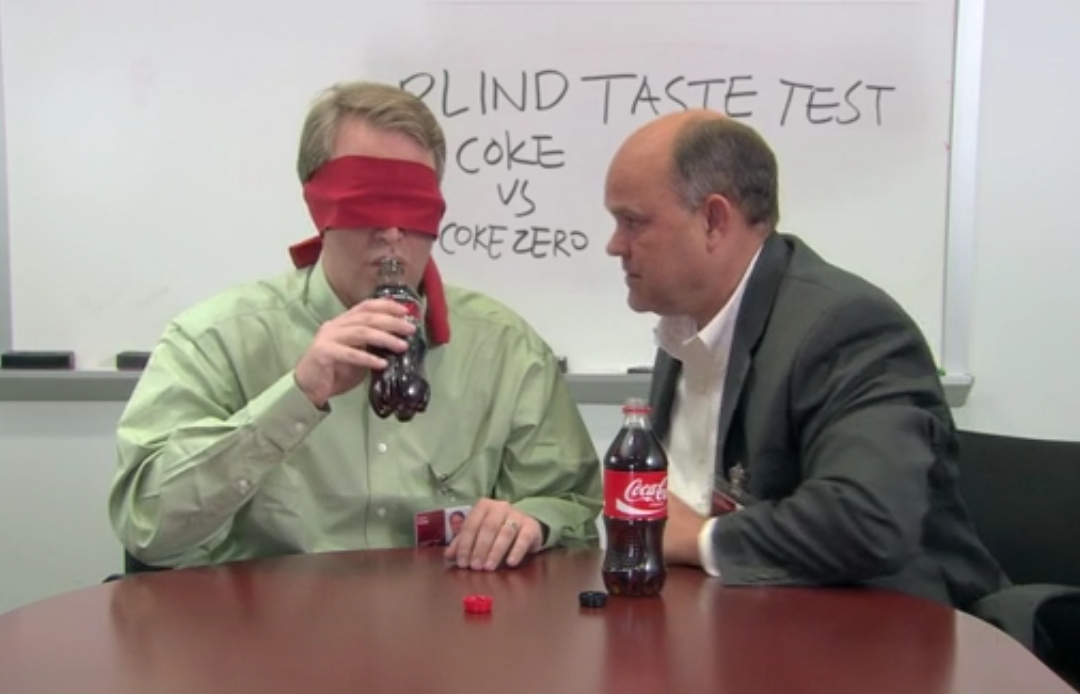
In this single blind taste test of two cola brands, the experimenter knows which bottle is which

In marketing, a blind taste test is often used as a tool for companies to compare their brand to another brand. For example, the Pepsi Challenge is a famous taste test that has been run by Pepsi since 1975. Additionally, taste tests are sometimes used as a tool by companies to develop their brand or new products.

Blind taste tests are ideal for goods such as food or wine (see blind wine tasting) that are consumed directly. Researchers use blind taste tests to obtain information about customers' perceptions and preferences on the goods. Blind taste test can be used to:

- Track views on a product over time
- assess changes or improvements made to a product
- gauge reactions to a new product
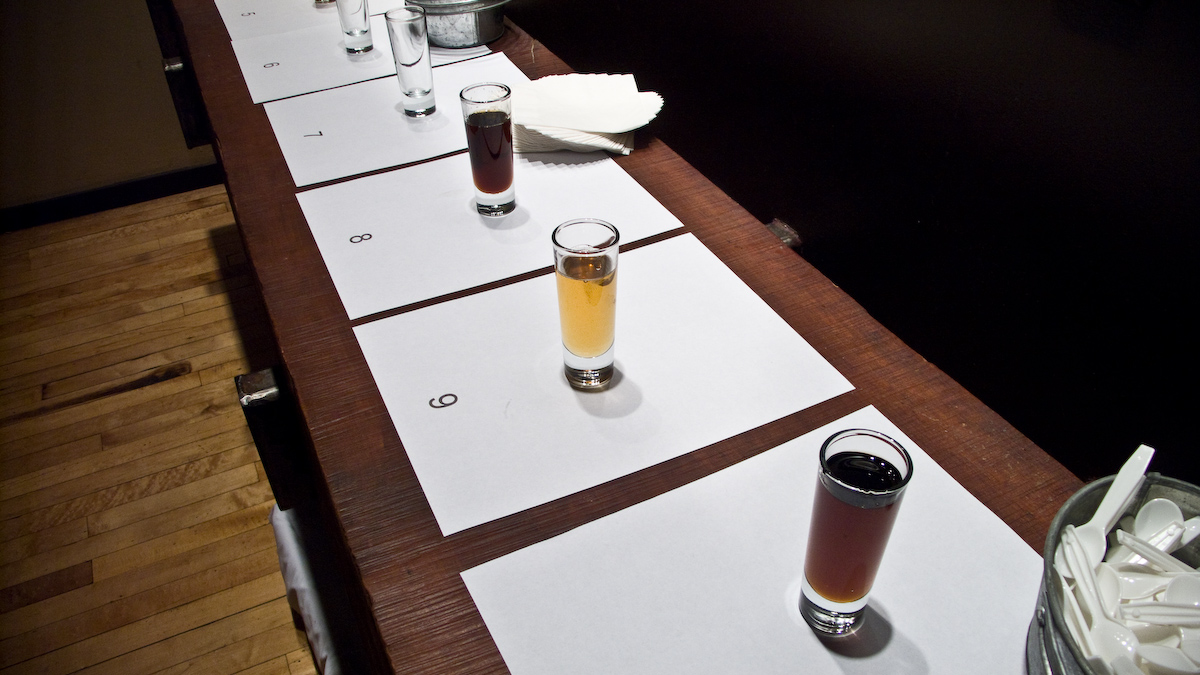
  Maple syrup Tasting

== Overview ==
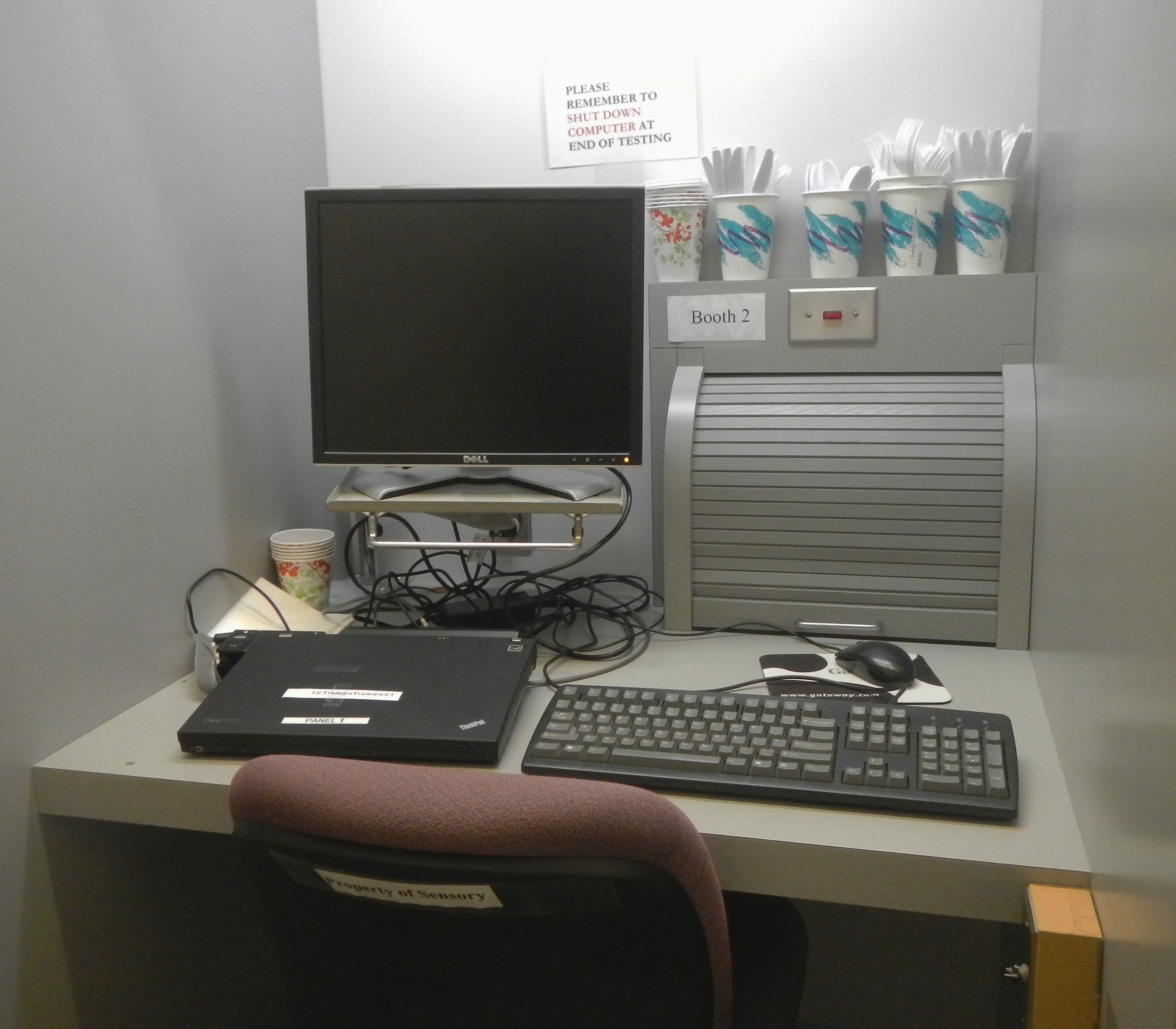
Isolation booth for taste testing for an independent lab. Tasters will receive samples through the box on the right.

Blind taste tests require a "blind testing" meaning the people taking the blind taste test are unaware of the identity of the brand being tested, or if done at home this can be as simple as a blindfold over the person taking the test. This means that any bias, preconceived ideas about a particular brand or food, is eliminated. The people taking the test will also be unaware of any changes done to the product.

In the famous Pepsi Challenge, people took a sip from two different unlabelled glasses, not knowing which was Coke and which was Pepsi.

== Types of blind taste tests ==
There are two types of blind taste tests:

- In a single blind taste test, experimenters know information about the participants, but the participants know nothing about the experimenters or the product they are testing. The aforementioned Pepsi Challenge is an example of a single blind test.
- In a double blind taste test, the experimenters know nothing about the participants, and the participants know nothing about the experimenters or the product they are testing.

== Blind wine tasting ==
The blind approach is routine for wine professionals (wine tasters, sommeliers and others) who wish to ensure impartiality in the judgment of the quality of wine during wine competitions or in the evaluation of a sommelier for professional certification. Blind tasting, at a minimum, involves denying taster(s) the ability to see the wine label or wine bottle shape. Informal tastings may simply conceal the bottles in a plain paper bag. More exacting competitions or evaluations utilize more stringent procedures, including safeguards against cheating. For example, the wine may be tasted from a black wine glass to mask the color.

Scientific research has long demonstrated the power of suggestion in perception as well as the strong effects of expectancies. For example, people expect more expensive wine to have more desirable characteristics than less expensive wine. When given wine that they are falsely told is expensive they virtually always report it as tasting better than the very same wine when they are told that it is inexpensive. French researcher Frédéric Brochet "submitted a mid-range Bordeaux in two different bottles, one labeled as a cheap table wine, the other bearing a grand cru etiquette." Tasters described the supposed grand cru as "woody, complex, and round" and the supposed cheap wine as "short, light, and faulty."

Similarly, people have expectations about wines because of their geographic origin, producer, vintage, color, and many other factors. For example, when Brochet served a white wine he received all the usual descriptions: "fresh, dry, honeyed, lively." Later he served the same wine dyed red and received the usual red terms: "intense, spicy, supple, deep."

=== Professional wine tasting judges ===
Perhaps the most famous instance of blind testing of professional wine tasters was the so-called Judgment of Paris, a wine competition held in 1976 wherein the French judges blind-tested wines from France and California. Against all expectations, California wines bested French wines according to the judges, a result which would have been unlikely in a non-blind contest. These results were both highly controversial and influential. The event had a revolutionary impact on expanding the production and prestige of wine in the New World. They also "gave the French a valuable incentive to review traditions that were sometimes more accumulations of habit and expediency, and to reexamine convictions that were little more than myths taken on trust." (The Judgment of Paris was described in the 2005 book Judgment of Paris by George M. Taber and depicted in the 2008 movie Bottle Shock.)

In 1999, Richard E. Quandt and Orley Ashenfelter published a paper in the journal Chance that questioned the statistical interpretation of the results of the 1976 Judgment of Paris. The authors noted that a "side-by-side chart of best-to-worst rankings of 18 wines by a roster of experienced tasters showed about as much consistency as a table of random numbers," and reinterpreted the data, altering the results slightly, using a formula that they argued was more statistically valid (and less conclusive). Quandt’s later paper "On Wine Bullshit" poked fun at the seemingly random strings of adjectives that often accompanied experts' published wine ratings. More recent work by Robin Goldstein, Hilke Plassmann, Robert Hodgson, and other economists and behavioral scientists has shown high variability and inconsistency both within and between blind tasters; and little correlation has been found between price and preference, even among wine experts, in tasting settings in which labels and prices have been concealed.

Robert Hodgson, a California vintner and retired oceanographer noticed that the results of wine competitions were surprisingly inconsistent. With some expertise in statistics, Hodgson approached the organizers of the California State Fair wine competition in 2005 with a proposal. In the course of their routine duties, he would sometimes present the judges with samples from the same bottle three times without their knowledge. The judges were among the top experts in the American wine industry: winemakers, sommeliers, critics and buyers as well as wine consultants and academics. The results were "disturbing"... "Over the years he has shown again and again that even trained, professional palates are terrible at judging wine." The results were published in the Journal of Wine Economics in 2008 and '09. Hodgson continued to analyze the results of wine competitions across the state and found that the medals awarded for wine excellence "were distributed at random". Although he concedes that "there are individual expert tasters with exceptional abilities", the objective evaluation of large numbers of wines as currently attempted at wine competitions is, he asserts, "beyond human ability".

=== Studies on non-professional consumers ===
In 2001, researchers from the University of Bordeaux asked 54 undergraduate oenology students to test two glasses of wine: one red, one white. The participants described the red as "jammy" and commented on its crushed red fruit. The participants failed to recognize that both wines were from the same bottle. The only difference was that one had been colored red with a flavorless dye.

For six years (1999-2005), Texas A&M University invited people to taste wines labeled "France", "California", "Texas", and while nearly all ranked the French as best, in fact, all three were the same Texas wine. The contest is built on the simple theory that if people don't know what they are drinking, they award points differently than if they do know what they are drinking.

Another well-publicized double-blind, but not peer reviewed, taste test was conducted in 2011 by Prof. Richard Wiseman of the University of Hertfordshire. In a wine tasting experiment using 400 participants, Wiseman found that general members of the public were unable to distinguish expensive wines from inexpensive ones. "People just could not tell the difference between cheap and expensive wine." Expensive wines are an example of a Veblen good, a luxury good for which the demand increases as the price increases.

== In popular culture ==
Taste tests are commonly employed by the public television show America's Test Kitchen and its spin-off series Cook's Country, typically administered by Jack Bishop.
