= Guy Crosby =

American professor and writer

Guy A. Crosby
- Born: June 10, 1942; Beverly, Massachusetts
- Died: February 3, 2026 (aged 83)
- Scientific career
- Fields: Organic chemistry, food science
- Workplaces: America's Test Kitchen; Cook's Illustrated
- Website: www.cookingscienceguy.com

Guy Crosby was an American professor, writer, and editor in the fields of organic chemistry and food science. He was known as the "Cooking Science Guy" for his work with the television show America's Test Kitchen. He wrote and edited three books on the topic of food science: The Science of Good Cooking in 2012, the James Beard nominated Cook's Science in 2016, both with America's Test Kitchen; and Cook, Taste, Learn in 2019.
