= Christopher Kimball =

American chef, editor, publisher, and radio/TV personality

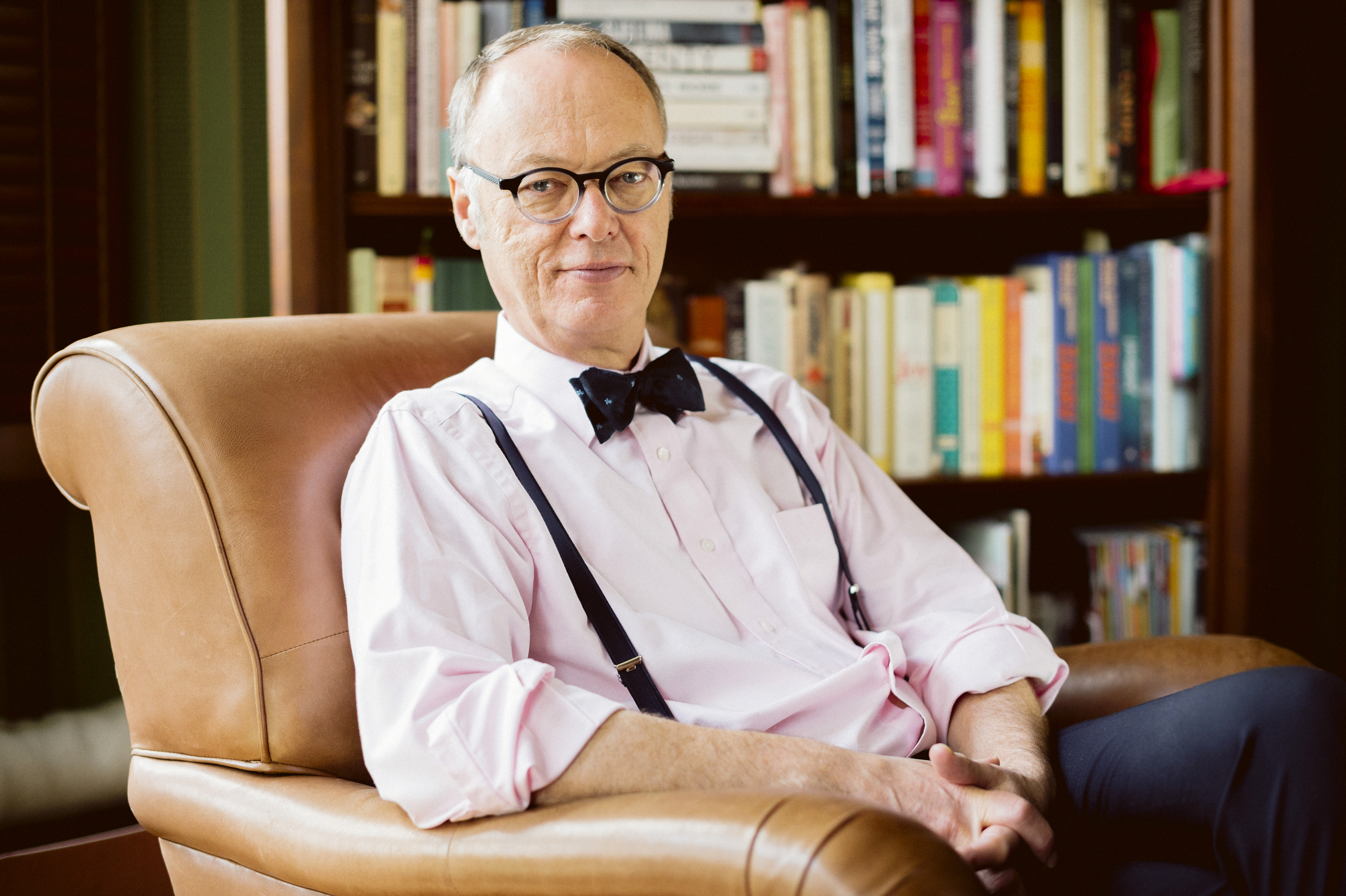
- Christopher Kimball in 2016
- Born: June 5, 1951 (age 75); Rye, New York, U.S.
- Education: Columbia University (B.A., 1973)
- Spouses: Adrienne Kimball (m. 1987; div. 2012) Melissa Lee Baldino (m. 2013)
- Culinary career
- Television shows
- Hosts; Christopher Kimball's Milk Street (2016-present); America's Test Kitchen (2000–2015); Cook's Country from America's Test Kitchen (2008–2015); Appears on Weekend Today, The Early Show
- Website: https://www.177milkstreet.com/

Christopher Kimball (born June 5, 1951) is an American editor, publisher, and radio and TV personality. He is one of the founders of America's Test Kitchen and Cook's Country and the creator of Christopher Kimball's Milk Street.

== Early life and education ==
Kimball was born and raised in Westchester County, New York, the son of Mary Alice White and Edward Norris Kimball. The family had a cabin in southwestern Vermont.

He graduated from Phillips Exeter Academy and then Columbia University (1973) with a degree in Primitive Art.

== Career ==
=== Early career ===
After graduating from Columbia, Kimball worked with his stepbrother in a publishing company. Soon after, he worked for The Center for Direct Marketing in Westport, Connecticut and also started taking cooking courses. In 1980, after securing $100,000 in angel investments from friends and family, he started Cook’s Magazine out of an office in Weston, Connecticut. He sold the magazine to the Bonnier Group in 1989.

=== America's Test Kitchen ===
Kimball was a co-founder, as well as editor and publisher, of America's Test Kitchen, which produces television and radio shows, and publishes magazines, including Cook's Illustrated, which Kimball launched in 1992. It also publishes Cook's Country magazine, which was launched in 2004. The company's revenue comes from its readers, rather than advertisers, which differentiates it from the competitors.

Its cookbook publisher division is Two Pigs Farm. Boston Common Press, a private partnership between Kimball, Eliot Wadsworth II, and George P. Denny III, owned Kimball's publishing activities. Kimball also hosted the syndicated public television cooking shows America's Test Kitchen and Cook's Country from America's Test Kitchen.

On November 16, 2015, a news release from Boston Common Press, parent company of Cooks Country, Cooks Illustrated and America's Test Kitchen, announced Kimball's departure. The 2016 TV programs had already been filmed and Kimball appeared as host, but his direct participation in the company ended immediately.

=== Christopher Kimball's Milk Street ===
In 2016, Kimball created Christopher Kimball's Milk Street, located on Milk Street in Boston, Massachusetts. On October 31, 2016, Boston Common Press (the parent company of America's Test Kitchen and Cook's Illustrated) filed a lawsuit against Kimball in Suffolk Superior Court, claiming that Kimball "literally and conceptually ripped off" his former employer. In the lawsuit, Boston Common Press claims Kimball built his new venture while still on their payroll, using company resources in the form of recipes and databases to help shape Milk Street Kitchen into a direct competitor. The lawsuit was settled in August 2019. As part of the settlement, Kimball sold his remaining ATK stock back to the company.

He was further sued by his ex-wife Adrienne who alleged his departure from Cook's Illustrated devalued the company and affected his payments to her.

=== Other ===
He is the author of The Cook's Bible, The Yellow Farmhouse Cookbook, Dear Charlie, The Dessert Bible, and Fannie's Last Supper, and is a columnist for the New York Daily News and the Boston-based Tab Communications.

His other television appearances include This Old House and the morning shows Weekend Today and The Early Show.

He has been a regular contributor on National Public Radio. On January 8, 2011, Kimball began hosting WGBH-FM's America's Test Kitchen Radio distributed by PRX. In 2015, when he left the America's Test Kitchen TV shows, his association with the radio program also ended. He began hosting a new weekly radio cooking show in 2016, Milk Street Radio, also heard on WGBH-FM in Boston, airing Sundays at 3 p.m., and syndicated to other US public radio stations.

== Personal life ==
He has been married three times. He has a son and three daughters with his second wife, Adrienne. They divorced in December 2012.

On June 30, 2013, Kimball married Melissa Lee Baldino, executive producer of the America's Test Kitchen television show. She is now co-founder of Christopher Kimball's Milk Street. Their son, Oliver Kimball, was born on May 4, 2017. A daughter, Rike, was born in 2019.

== Sources ==
- Metcalf, Stephen (October 13, 2003). "Sexy Food Nerds: Cooking geeks get hot on America's Test Kitchen". Slate.
- "In the Test Kitchen With Christopher Kimball". Powell's Books. Archived from the original on 2006-11-13.
- "Tour the Test Kitchen: Cast Biographies". America's Test Kitchen. americastestkitchen.com.
