= Jeannie Mai =

American television host (born 1979)

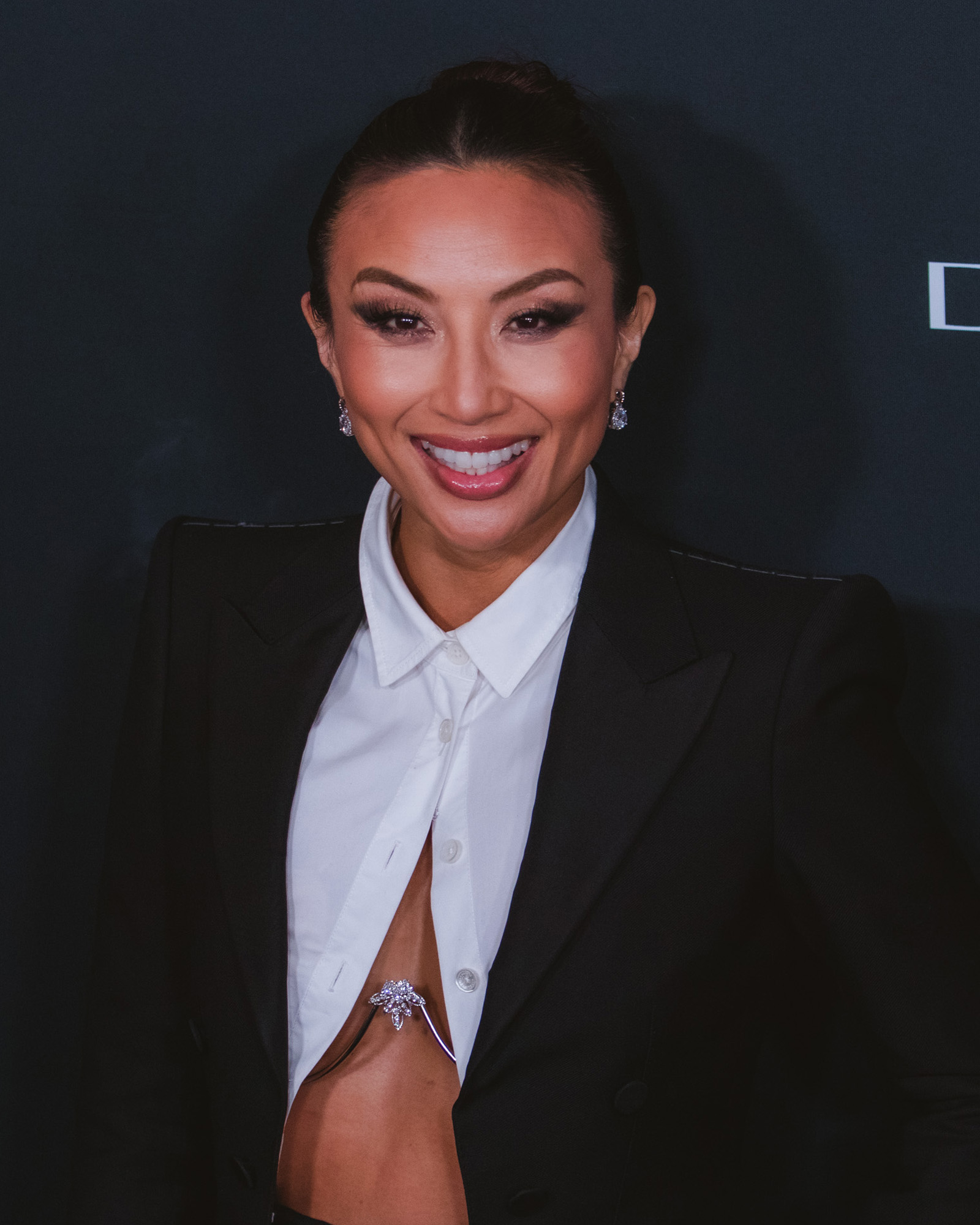
- Mai in 2026
- Born: Jeannie Camtu Mai; January 4, 1979 (age 47); San Jose, California, U.S.
- Other name: Jeannie Mai Jenkins
- Occupations: Television host; stylist
- Years active: 1998–present
- Television: How Do I Look?; The Real; Holey Moley
- Spouses: Freddy Harteis (m. 2007; div. 2018) Jeezy (m. 2021; div. 2024)
- Children: 1

Jeannie Camtu Mai (born January 4, 1979) is an American television personality and stylist, best known for her work on the makeover show How Do I Look? and the syndicated daytime talk show The Real, for which she also won a Daytime Emmy Award for Outstanding Entertainment Talk Show Host in 2018. As a fashion expert, she is frequently featured on television programs such as Today, Extra TV, Entertainment Tonight, and Insider. She has also appeared as a host for E! and as a red carpet host for the American Music Awards. Mai was a correspondent for the 2011, 2012, and 2013 Miss Universe pageants; she co-hosted the 2022 and 2023 editions as well.

== Early life ==
Jeannie Mai was born and raised in San Jose, California, to a Chinese Vietnamese father and a Vietnamese mother. She attended Milpitas High School. During an episode of her YouTube series Hello Hunnay, Mai disclosed that she was sexually abused by a family member starting at the age of nine.

== Career ==
=== 1997–2012 ===
At age 18, Mai launched her career as a makeup artist for MAC Cosmetics while still living in San Jose. As a trainer, she worked her way from face to face until she was eventually traveling the world to work for celebrities such as Christina Aguilera and Alicia Keys. This led her to also serve as a celebrity-makeup stylist for MTV's Total Request Live, KCAL Los Angeles, and Good Day Sacramento.

In 2003, Mai began auditioning for local television networks with self-written scripts to demonstrate her hosting talents. She was hired to co-host the Asian-American magazine-style show Stir on the International Channel. Later, the San Francisco-based California Music Channel hired her to host her own music countdown. Mai went on to become an entertainment reporter and producer of the WB's The Daily Mixx.

In 2005, Mai landed her first primetime hosting role on Character Fantasy on the USA Network, where she inspired guests each week to live their fantasies. Following this, she moved to Los Angeles to appear on MTV's Granted alongside Frankie Muniz and hosted segments related to fashion and entertainment news on networks such as E!, Lifetime, TLC, and NBC on the lattermost's talk morning program Today. She also started appearing as a member of the beauty squad on TLC's 10 Years Younger. In 2008, Mai hosted TLC's Miss America Reality Check. She also starred in the makeover special Dude, Where's Your Style, and became spokesperson of the cosmetics Never Accept Ordinary. The following year, Mai became host of the Style Network's fashion makeover show How Do I Look? She also served as a correspondent and weekend host on NBC's Extra TV with Mario Lopez. In the digital realm, Mai was the resident contributor to Perez Hilton's fashion site Cocoperez.com. In 2011, Mai began hosting the Miss Universe pageant and was a fashion consultant on the NBC weight-loss competition The Biggest Loser. Furthermore, Mai also hosted the stylist competition The Next Style Star from Maker Studios, and was the digital correspondent for NBC's Fashion Star. In 2012, she appeared as a guest judge on Asia's Next Top Model, Cycle 1.

=== 2013–present ===
In 2013, Mai became the host of a live weekly series titled Style Pop, which ran for one season on the Style Network. Mai served as one of the co-hosts of the syndicated daytime talk show The Real from 2013 until 2022. Known for her lively personality and candid discussions, Mai brought her unique perspective to the panel, which included co-hosts Tamera Mowry, Adrienne Bailon, Loni Love, Tamar Braxton, and later, Garcelle Beauvais. The show premiered on July 15, 2013. Following a trial summer run during 2013 on the Fox Television Stations group, it was picked up to series the following year. In 2018, Mai and her co-hosts won the Daytime Emmy Award for Outstanding Entertainment Talk Show Host for their work.

In 2015, Mai hosted the reality competition Steampunk'd on GSN. She was also a fashion correspondent on Entertainment Tonight.

In 2016, Mai brought her show How Do I Look? to Asia's Diva network. The following year, she portrayed Lady Luck on the American game show The Joker's Wild. Mai also became an ambassador for ReimagineMyself.com a program encouraging people living with relapsing multiple sclerosis (MS) to reimagine life with the chronic disease.

From 2019 to 2022 Mai appeared as a sideline correspondent on the hit mini-golf competition show Holey Moley on ABC.

On September 2, 2020, Mai was announced as one of the celebrities competing on the 29th season of Dancing with the Stars. She was forced to exit the show on November 2, 2020, after being diagnosed with epiglottitis, an inflammatory condition that can cause swelling and block airflow to the lungs.

On October 18, 2022, Mai was announced as the host of America's Test Kitchen: The Next Generation, which premiered on December 9, 2022.

On January 4, 2023, Mai and former Miss Universe Olivia Culpo were announced as hosts for the 71st Miss Universe pageant to be held at New Orleans, Louisiana on January 14.

Mai, Miss Universe 2022 R'Bonney Gabriel and Alden Richards were announced as hosts for the Miss Universe Philippines 2024 to be held at the SM Mall of Asia Arena in Pasay, Metro Manila, Philippines, on May 22, 2024.

In November 2024, Mai had a supporting role in the Lifetime television film, Christmas In The Spotlight," a holiday-themed romantic comedy loosely based on the real-life relationship between Travis Kelce and Taylor Swift.

== Personal life ==
Mai is a Christian. She married Freddy Harteis on August 11, 2007; the couple divorced in December 2018.

In 2019, Mai announced that she had started dating rapper Jeezy. The couple married in 2021 at their home in Atlanta, Georgia. In January 2022, it was announced that Mai had given birth to a daughter. On September 14, 2023, Jenkins filed for divorce from Mai, seeking joint legal custody of their daughter. On June 12, 2024, the divorce was finalized.

== Awards and nominations ==
Year	Award	Category	Nominated work	Result	Ref.
2016	Daytime Emmy Awards	Outstanding Entertainment Talk Show Host	The Real (shared with Adrienne Houghton, Tamar Braxton, Loni Love and Tamera Mowry-Housley)	Nominated	
2017	Daytime Emmy Awards	Outstanding Entertainment Talk Show Host	The Real (shared with Braxton, Houghton, Love and Mowry-Housley)	Nominated	
2018	NAACP Image Awards	Outstanding Talk Series	The Real (shared with Houghton, Love and Mowry-Housley)	Won	
2018	Daytime Emmy Awards	Outstanding Entertainment Talk Show Host	The Real (shared with Houghton, Love and Mowry-Housley)	Won	
2019	NAACP Image Awards	Outstanding Talk Series	The Real (shared with Houghton, Love and Mowry-Housley)	Won	
2019	Daytime Emmy Awards	Outstanding Entertainment Talk Show Host	The Real (shared with Houghton, Love and Mowry-Housley)	Nominated	

Media offices
Preceded by Steve Harvey	Hosts of Miss Universe; 2022 – 2023; With: Olivia Culpo	Succeeded by Mario Lopez
