= James Beard Foundation Award =

Annual awards for culinary professionals in the US

James Beard Foundation Awards
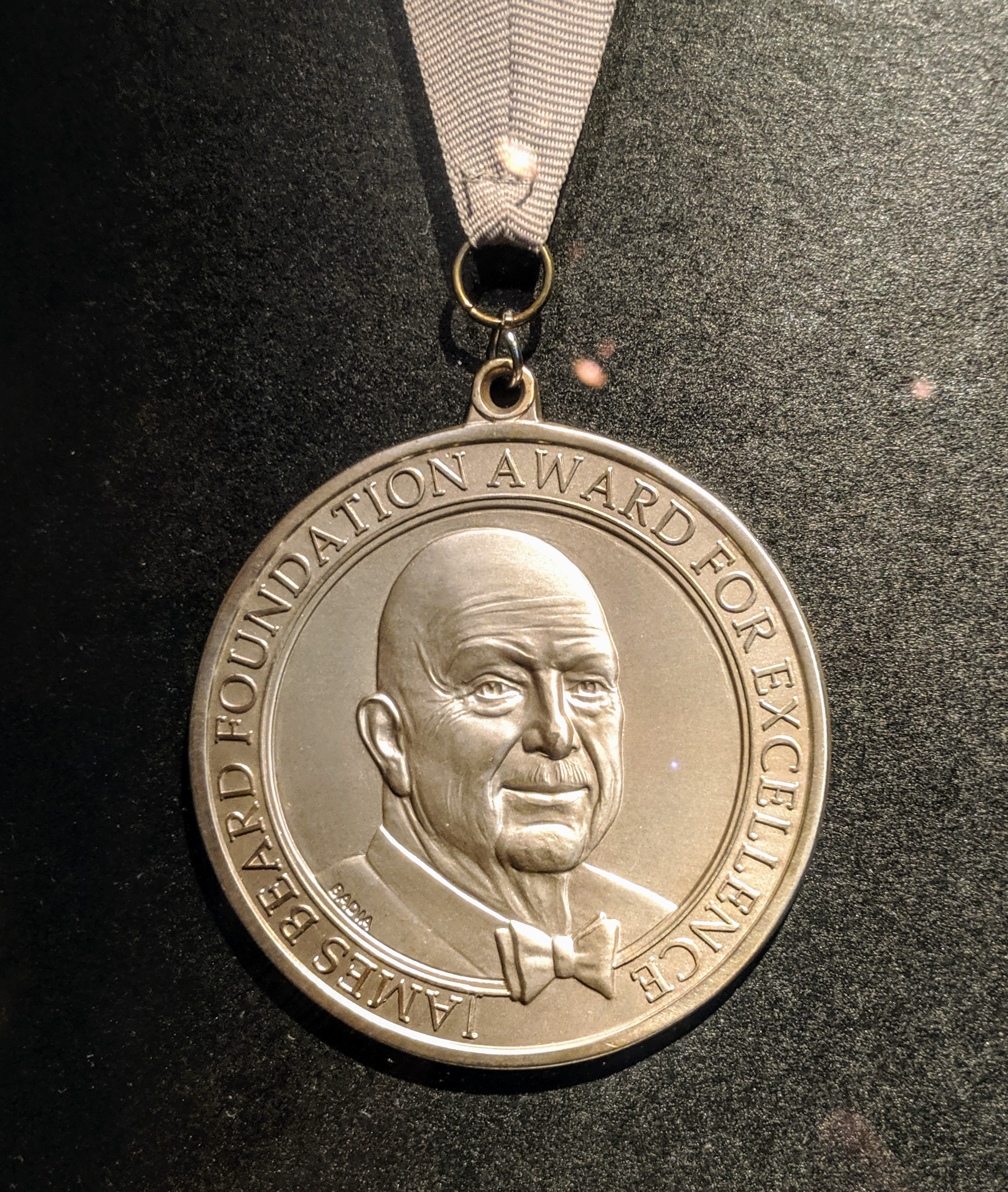
- James Beard Foundation Award for Excellence medallion
- Country: United States
- First award: 1991
- Website: www.jamesbeard.org

The James Beard Foundation Awards are annual awards presented by the James Beard Foundation to recognize chefs, restaurateurs, food writers, cookbooks, critics and journalists in the United States. The James Beard Foundation Awards have been likened to the Academy Awards of the food world due to its prestige and recognition.

The awards are voted on by more than 600 culinary professionals, including previous award winners. Recipients receive a medallion etched with the image of James Beard and a certificate from the foundation.

== History ==
The James Beard Foundation Award was officially established in 1990 through a merger with Who's Who of American Cooking and French's Food and Beverage Book Awards from Cook's Magazine (the predecessor to Cook's Illustrated). In addition to the chef, restaurant, and book awards, journalism awards were added in 1993, which expanded to broadcast media in 1994, and restaurant design awards were first given in 1995.

The first award ceremony took place in 1991, with ceremonies following every year until 2020, when the chef and restaurant awards (for 2019) were canceled, due to the COVID-19 pandemic. Instead, the book and media awards were announced online on May 27, 2020. A virtual event was broadcast from Chicago on September 25, 2020. In August 2020, the James Beard Foundation announced that no awards for a 2020 ceremony (held in 2021) would be given. Award ceremonies fully resumed in 2022.

In 2018, the James Beard Foundation changed the award's rules to be more inclusive, to fight race and gender imbalances in the industry. Changes include judges reflecting the demographics of the United States, retiring the Who's Who of Food and Beverage in America awards (which were judged by previous winners), adding leadership awards which focus on social justice issues, in addition to waiving some media entry fees.

The award ceremonies are usually scheduled around James Beard's May 5 birthday. The media awards are presented at a dinner in New York City; the chef and restaurant awards were also presented in New York until 2015, when the foundation's annual gala moved to Chicago. Chicago will continue to host the Awards until 2027.
