= Bridget Lancaster =

American television presenter and chef

Bridget Lancaster is an American chef, food writer, and television personality who is best known for co-hosting and executive producing America's Test Kitchen and Cook's Country, which air on American Public Television (PBS). She co-hosts with Julia Collin Davison.

== Early life and education ==
Lancaster was born and raised in Cross Lanes, West Virginia, attended Nitro High School and later attended Boston University where she graduated with a degree in anthropology.

== Culinary career ==
Lancaster focuses on the details of recipes during cooking, including the chemical interactions and their influence on the final dish. She takes this role in America's Test Kitchen, a show that conducts analysis of recipes to determine the best technique to reach the final dish perfectly.

Lancaster has authored several cookbooks, including Cooking at Home With Bridget & Julia: The TV Hosts of America's Test Kitchen Share Their Favorite Recipes for Feeding Family and Friends.

== Philanthropy ==
Lancaster is a board member of Lovin' Spoonfuls, a non-profit organization that collects and distributes food to the underserved in Boston. She is also an activist for sustainable farming and has worked to help farms (and food producers) to reach sustainability.
