= Cook's Country =

American television series

- Genre: Cooking
- Directed by: Herb Sevush
- Presented by: Bridget Lancaster (2017–present); Julia Collin Davison (2017–present); Toni Tipton-Martin (2021-2025)
- Starring: Bridget Lancaster (2008–present); Julia Collin Davison (2008–present); Christopher Kimball (2008–2016); Jack Bishop (2008–present); Adam Ried (2008–2024); Rebecca (Becky) Hays (2020- present); Dan Souza (2008-)(Cook's Illustrated Editor-in-Chief 2017); Hannah Crowley (2025-present); Erin McMurrer (2008–2016); Ashley Moore (2017–present); Christie Morrison (2017–present); Bryan Roof (2017–present); Elle Simone (2016-26); Lan Lam (2018); Lawman Johnson (2019–2025); Natalie Estrada (2019); Morgan Bolling (2020-Present)
- Opening theme: "Right Between Your Eyes" by Hot Buttered Rum (Seasons 1–11); New theme song (Seasons 12–present)
- Ending theme: Instrumental
- Country of origin: United States
- Original language: English
- No. of seasons: 19
- No. of episodes: 267 (list of episodes)

Production
- Executive producers: Mary Agnes; Jack Bishop; Julia Collin Davison; Bridget Lancaster
- Production locations: Rupert, Vermont (seasons 1–10); Boston, Massachusetts (seasons 11–present)
- Running time: 27 minutes
- Production company: America’s Test Kitchen Productions

Original release
- Network: American Public Television
- Release: September 6, 2008 – present

Cook's Country is an American half-hour television cooking show on public television stations and Create and distributed by American Public Television. The show is based on Cook's Country magazine (published by the same company as Cook's Illustrated). In July 2025, America's Test Kitchen announced that publication of Cook's Country magazine would cease after the October-November 2025 issue.

== Cast ==
The structure of Cook's Country is similar to sister show America's Test Kitchen, with many of the same cast. Bridget Lancaster and Julia Collin Davison host the show. Jack Bishop is in charge of the Tasting Lab, while Adam Ried features new products in the Equipment Corner.

Christopher Kimball hosted the show for the first nine seasons.

On November 16, 2015, a news release from Boston Commons Press, parent company of Cooks Country, Cooks Illustrated, and America's Test Kitchen, announced the departure of Christopher Kimball over a contract dispute. Season 9's TV programs had already been filmed with Kimball as the host, but he would not appear on any future episodes.

Due to the departure of Christopher Kimball, Bridget Lancaster and Julia Collin Davison began hosting Cook's Country in season 10. Also in season 10, America's Test Kitchen staff members Ashley Moore, Christie Morrison, and Bryan Roof were added to the cast, while Erin McMurrer, having moved to the America's Test Kitchen cast, is no longer seen on air on Cook's Country.

Season 11 added Lan Lam to the Cast. New staff members Lawman Johnson and Natalie Estrada were added in season 12, while Lan Lam is no longer seen on Cook's Country. Morgan Bolling joined the cast in 2020, while Natalie Estrada departed the show.

Toni Tipton-Martin joined as Editor-in-Chief in season 14, giving a history lesson on each episode's primary recipe or ingredient. She also began introducing segments for the show. She no longer appears.

Beginning Season 18, Hannah Crowley is now featured in the Equipment Segment replacing Adam Ried.

Season 19 now added Kelly Song and Lidey Heuck to the cast. Also Morgan Bolling now host new segment Recipe Revival. Lawman Johnson departed at the end of Season 18. In addition, Bridget Lancaster and Julia Collin Davidson opens up the intro.

== Episodes ==
Season	Episodes	Originally released	
Season	Episodes	First released	Last released
1	13	September 6, 2008	November 29, 2008
2	13	September 5, 2009	November 28, 2009
3	13	September 4, 2010	November 27, 2010
4	13	September 10, 2011	January 14, 2012
5	13	September 15, 2012	December 8, 2012
6	13	September 7, 2013	November 23, 2013
7	13	August 30, 2014	November 22, 2014
8	13	September 13, 2015	December 6, 2015
9	13	August 27, 2016	November 19, 2016
10	13	August 26, 2017	November 18, 2017
11	13	August 25, 2018	November 17, 2018
12	13	August 24, 2019	November 16, 2019
13	13	September 12, 2020	December 5, 2020
14	13	September 18, 2021	December 11, 2021
15	18	August 20, 2022	December 17, 2022
16	15	September 9, 2023	December 16, 2023
17	26	September 21, 2024	May 24, 2025
18	26	September 20, 2025	May 23, 2026
19	26	September 19, 2026	May 22, 2027

In contrast to its predecessor, Cook's Country focuses on regional recipes across the United States. The hosts begins each segment with a historical perspective on each recipe prior to the demonstration.

The first nine seasons were recorded on location at a farmhouse in Rupert, Vermont. The next season, the show was filmed at a set that replicated the location's kitchen. Beginning in season 11, taping and production were moved to a purpose-built farmhouse studio set at America's Test Kitchen headquarters in Boston, Massachusetts. The Tasting Lab segments are filmed before a live studio audience.

The theme music for seasons 1–11, "Right Between Your Eyes", is performed by the San Francisco bluegrass band Hot Buttered Rum. As of season 12, the theme music is instrumental.

== Awards ==
Year	Title	Award
2016	Cook's Country from America's Test Kitchen	Daytime Emmy Award Nomination: Outstanding Culinary Program
2012	Cook's Country from America's Test Kitchen	Daytime Emmy Award Nomination: Outstanding Directing in a Lifestyle/Culinary Program
