= Jack Bishop =

American celebrity chef and food author

- Spouse: Lauren Chattman
- Culinary career
- Cooking style: Italian
- Television show(s): America’s Test Kitchen (PBS) Cook’s Country (PBS) The Today Show (NBC)

Jack Bishop is an American celebrity chef and food author whose specialty is Italian cuisine and vegetarian cooking. He is the chief creative officer of America's Test Kitchen on PBS.

== Personal life ==
Bishop studied cooking in Florence, Italy. He graduated from Mountain Lakes High School, New Jersey and considers Mountain Lakes his hometown. His mother first taught him to cook at home when he was 12 years old, as she worked late hours and his father was not a very good cook. He lives in Sag Harbor, New York, with his food-writer wife Lauren Chattman and their two daughters. Bishop is a decade-long member of his local community farm.

== Career ==
In 1988, Jack Bishop started working at Cook's Magazine and collaborated on the launch of Cook's Illustrated in 1993. During his tenure with Cook's, he established tasting conventions later used at America's Test Kitchen. Bishop edited The Best Recipe (1999), co-directed Cook's Country magazine in 2005, and became a cast member of America’s Test Kitchen and Cook’s Country on PBS, hosting the Testing Lab segments and serving as an executive producer. Jack also regularly appears on Today (NBC). A Year in a Vegetarian Kitchen was nominated for a James Beard Foundation Award (Vegetarian) in 2005.

=== Cookbooks ===
- Lasagna
- Something Sweet
- The Complete Italian Vegetarian Cookbook
- Pasta e Verdura
- Vegetables Every Day
- Italian Cooking Essentials for Dummies (co-authored with Cesare Casella)
- A Year in a Vegetarian Kitchen

=== Television ===
- America's Test Kitchen (PBS)
- Cook's Country (PBS)
- The Today Show (NBC)
