= Elle Simone =

American chef (1976–2026)

- Born: LaShawnda Sherise Simone Scott; November 28, 1976; Detroit, Michigan, U.S.
- Died: January 5, 2026 (aged 49); Boston, Massachusetts, U.S.
- Occupations: Chef; culinary producer; test cook; food stylist

Elle Simone (born LaShawnda Sherise Simone Scott; November 28, 1976 – January 5, 2026), also known as Elle Simone Scott, was an American chef, culinary producer, test cook and food stylist. She was the first Black woman to appear as a regular host on the PBS television show America's Test Kitchen. She was the founder of the mentoring organization SheChef.

== Early life and education ==
Elle Simone was born LaShawnda Sherise Simone Scott on November 28, 1976 and grew up in Detroit, Michigan, in a middle-class Seventh-day Adventist family. She attended Eastern Michigan University. Her first cooking job was at a kosher bakery in Oak Park, Michigan. Before entering the culinary field, Simone worked as a social worker in Detroit. She moonlighted as a prep cook. She attended the Culinary Institute of New York. She had a master's degree in entertainment business.

== Culinary career ==
Simone lost her job as a social worker, her car, and her home during the 2008 recession. She took a job on a cruise ship as a cook for two years. In 2009 she moved to New York, working at a women's shelter, and in 2010 attended culinary school. She did an internship with Food Network. She worked as a food stylist for Cabot Creamery and The Chew. She worked in culinary production for Cook's Country, Food Network, Bravo, and Cooking Channel.

Simone was the first African American woman to appear as a regular host on the PBS television show America's Test Kitchen starting in 2016. She was a test cook and food stylist for the show. She also developed videos for the show's online cooking school.

She was featured in a segment of NBC's The Hub Today in 2018 and in 2019 hosted 28 Days of Edna, a monthlong America's Test Kitchen series focused on Edna Lewis.

Simone was a member of the board of Women Chefs and Restaurateurs. She said she wanted to become the "culinary Oprah".

== Philanthropy ==
Simone founded SheChef, a for-profit mentoring and networking organization for women of color in the culinary field, in 2013. As of November 2018 it had over 1000 members. She was motivated to do so after realizing that although 90% of her culinary school classmates had been women or persons of color, this group was underrepresented among chefs.

After her 2016 ovarian cancer diagnosis, Simone became active with the Ovarian Cancer Research Alliance, joining the board of directors of the organization and chairing or emceeing various events, especially focused on raising funds or awareness about ovarian cancer among women of color.

== Personal life and death ==
Simone was diagnosed with ovarian cancer in 2016, at the age of 40, and served on the board of directors for Ovarian Cancer Research Alliance. She was openly queer and dated another woman at a christian college, and when her family found out they became estranged. She died at her home in Boston on January 5, 2026, at age 49.

== Books ==
- Simone Scott, Elle (2022). Boards: Stylish Spreads for Casual Gatherings. Boston: America's Test Kitchen. ISBN 9781954210011. OCLC 1261878262. OL 39641456M.
- Simone Scott, Elle (2024). Food Gifts: 150+ Irresistible Recipes for Crafting Personalized Presents. Boston: America's Test Kitchen. ISBN 9781954210820. OCLC 1429158479. OL 51108654M.
