= Cook's Illustrated =

American cooking magazine

- Cover of the November–December 2024 issue
- Categories: Cooking
- Frequency: Bimonthly
- Circulation: 1,000,000 (2007)
- Founded: 1993; 33 years ago
- Company: Marquee Brands; (via America's Test Kitchen Limited Partnership)
- Based in: Brookline, Massachusetts
- Website: www.cooksillustrated.com
- ISSN: 1068-2821

Cook's Illustrated is an American cooking magazine published every two months by America's Test Kitchen Limited Partnership (ATK) in Brookline, Massachusetts. On February 2, 2023, Cook's Illustrated was one of ATK's brands included in the sale of its controlling interest to Marquee Brands.

It accepts no advertising and is characterized by extensive recipe testing and detailed instructions. The magazine also conducts thorough evaluations of kitchen equipment and branded foods and ingredients.

== History ==
Founder and former editor Christopher Kimball launched Cook's magazine in 1980 with money raised from investors. Kimball eventually sold Cook's to Condé Nast Publications, which discontinued the magazine in 1989. Kimball later reacquired rights to the name, hired several former Cook's staff members, and launched a rebranded Cook's Illustrated in 1993.

Circulation grew from an initial 25,000 to 600,000 in 2004 and one million subscribers in 2007, maintaining a growth rate substantially higher than the general category of cooking magazines. In 2009, Cook's Illustrated magazine had 1.2 million subscribers, a figure that grew by 11% on average over the previous nine years. The 78% renewal rate is twice the 35–40% rate for all consumer magazines. The website enjoys 300,000 paid subscribers, about half of whom also subscribe to one of the magazines.

The magazine's staff also produces the PBS cooking shows America's Test Kitchen and Cook's Country, and publishes cookbooks including The Best Recipe and America's Test Kitchen series. A sister magazine, Cook's Country, which emphasizes home-style cooking and reader submissions, launched in October 2004; the two magazines come out in alternate months. Though the company is still officially known as Boston Common Press, most of its publishing activity is done under the America's Test Kitchen brand.

On November 16, 2015, a news release from Boston Commons Press announced the departure of Kimball over a contract dispute. The 2016 TV programs had already been filmed and Kimball appeared as host, but his direct participation in the company was ended immediately. He remains a minority stockholder in the closely held company. There had been signs of a dispute between the corporate leadership and Kimball ever since September 2015 when David Nussbaum was appointed from outside the company as CEO, above Kimball.

On February 2, 2023, Marquee Brands became a majority owner of America's Test Kitchen Limited Partnership and its associated brands, including Cook's Illustrated and Cook's Country. Also David Nussbaum was replaced by Dan Suratt as CEO of ATK.

== Format ==
Each issue of Cook's Illustrated is 32 pages in length. While formerly printed almost entirely in black-and-white, the magazine received full color photos and illustrations in 2018, aligning with 25th anniversary of the magazine. The front and back covers contain color illustrations of various foods and ingredients, and the inside of the back cover contains color photographs of the recipes featured in the issue.

Founder Kimball's philosophy, which his magazine reflects, is that there is a "single best way to make a dish" that leads to "nearly bulletproof" results. About 10,000 "friends of Cook's'" provide feedback that help the magazine choose recipes. Approximately ten recipes are presented in each issue, taking the form of a narrative in which the author discusses the recipe's evolution. The author of each article usually begins by relating the reason why they decided to create the recipe. For instance, they might have enjoyed the dish from their childhood, wanted to simplify a typically time-consuming recipe, or tried a dish in a restaurant that they wanted to recreate. The article then follows the recipe's development, which invariably begins with numerous problems in its original incarnation. The author then describes iteratively modifying the recipe's ingredients and cooking method, each time presenting the recipe to a panel of tasters who provide feedback. At the end of the article, the author reaches a final recipe and lists the ingredients and preparation instructions, often with minor variants. Recipes typically include hand-drawn illustrations of any difficult cuts or other uncommon preparation.

Recipes in the magazine often utilize unorthodox, but easy, inexpensive, and commonplace ingredients and instructions. For instance, a recipe for Chinese barbecued pork substitutes ketchup for the traditional red bean curd, which can be difficult to find in the United States; a method for improving inexpensive beef roasts suggests turning off the oven during the final hour of cooking to improve the beef's texture; and a recipe for low-fat cookies includes pureed dates, an unorthodox ingredient that the author preferred over more traditional low-fat alternatives.

Each magazine also includes a detailed taste test, in which a panel of tasters evaluates different brands of ingredients such as ketchup, dark chocolate or balsamic vinegar. In addition to testing each ingredient by itself, tasters also try the ingredient in several recipes, such as pots de crème and brownies in the case of dark chocolate. Often, a category is sub-organized into purposes, such as "best teas plain" and "best teas with milk". The magazine also applies this process of testing and evaluating to kitchen tools and products.

Every issue includes a detailed equipment test, where a panel of users tries a variety of items such as knives, cutting boards or baking sheets. In the case of more expensive pieces of equipment, an overall winner as well as a "best buy" are selected. Both types of tests sort their results into four categories: Highly Recommended, Recommended, Recommended with Reservations, and Not Recommended. As with recipes, much space is devoted to explaining the selection and testing process, and any exceptions to the general conclusions.

In addition to the featured test, most issues test a few other products with less detail, where the best and worst brands in each category are presented with a brief description of the products' highlights and drawbacks. The magazine also features a "Kitchen Notes" section, providing tips on completing common cooking chores, often relevant to the recipes in the issue; a "Recipe Update", in which the magazine provides variations on recipes from previous issues; "Quick Tips" submitted by readers; and "Notes from Readers", in which the magazine's editors respond to reader questions. Many issues also include a two-page spread illustrating details on a general method or task, such as "Mastering the Art of Stew" or "Stocking a Baking Pantry".

== Other media ==
=== Books ===
Year Published	Title	Description	New York Times Best Seller
2016	Cook's Science	How to Unlock Flavor in 50 of our Favorite Ingredients	
2016	All-Time Best Appetizers	A perfectly curated selection of our favorite appetizer recipes	
2016	All-Time Best Soups	Definitive takes on classic soups and new recipes that blend favorite flavors with delicious results	
2015	Kitchen Hacks	How Clever Cooks Get Things Done	
2014	The Cook's Illustrated Meat Cookbook	The Game-Changing Guide That Teaches You How to Cook Meat and Poultry with 425 Bulletproof Recipes	
2013	The Cook's Illustrated Baking Book	Baking Demystified with 450 Foolproof Recipes from America's Most Trusted Food Magazine	
2012	The Science of Good Cooking	Master 50 Simple Concepts to Enjoy a Lifetime of Success in the Kitchen	Yes
2011	The Cook's Illustrated Cookbook	2,000 Recipes from 20 Years of America's Most Trusted Cooking Magazine	Yes
2009	More Best Recipes		
2007	The Best International Recipe		
2004	Baking Illustrated	The Practical Kitchen Companion for the Home Baker	
2004	The New Best Recipe	The timeless kitchen companion featuring 1,000 foolproof recipes, illustrated kitchen tutorials, and unbiased product ratings	

== See also ==
- List of food and drink magazines
