= America's Test Kitchen =

American television program

- Also known as: America's Test Kitchen from Cooks Illustrated Magazine
- Genre: Cooking
- Presented by: Christopher Kimball (2001–2016); Julia Collin Davison (cast member, 2001–present; host, 2017–present); Bridget Lancaster (cast member, 2001–present; host, 2017–present)
- Country of origin: United States
- Original language: English
- No. of seasons: 26
- No. of episodes: 649 (list of episodes)

Production
- Executive producers: Jack Bishop; Kaitlin Keleher; Julia Collin Davison; Bridget Lancaster
- Production locations: Brookline, Massachusetts (seasons 1–18); Boston, Massachusetts (seasons 19–present)
- Camera setup: Multi-camera
- Running time: 27 minutes
- Production companies: WETA; America's Test Kitchen Productions

Original release
- Network: syndication/Create
- Release: August 4, 2001 – present

Related
- Cook's Country

America's Test Kitchen (originally America's Test Kitchen from Cook's Illustrated Magazine) is a half-hour long American cooking show broadcast by public television stations and Create and distributed by American Public Television. Originally hosted by Christopher Kimball, the program currently is co-hosted by Julia Collin Davison and Bridget Lancaster.

On the show, a handful of test cooks are filmed in a real, working test kitchen, including hosts Davison and Lancaster and chefs Keith Dresser, Becky Hayes, Lan Lam, Erin McMurrer, and Dan Souza. Also, Bryan Roof, Christie Morrison, Ashley Moore, Lawman Johnson, and Morgan Bolling prepare recipes as they discuss what works, what doesn't, and why, highlighting the rigorous recipe testing process at the core of the test kitchen's mission. Equipment expert Adam Ried, gadget critic Lisa McManus, and tasting expert Jack Bishop help viewers understand what to look for when buying gear and ingredients.

The show is affiliated with America's Test Kitchen, publishers of Cook's Illustrated and Cook's Country magazines. Beginning in Season 19, the show is recorded at ATK's test kitchen facility at the Innovation and Design Building in Boston, Massachusetts. Although the show's studios are in Boston, it is produced by WETA-TV, a PBS station in Washington, DC, rather than Boston PBS station WGBH.

On February 2, 2023, Marquee Brands became a majority owner of ATK (America's Test Kitchen Limited Partnership) and its associated brands, including Cook's Illustrated and Cook's Country.

On March 24, 2023, America's Test Kitchen laid off 23 workers or about 10 percent of its staff. That included the entire team that worked on the ATK Kids brand.

== Episode format ==
A typical episode of the show consists primarily of two or three recipes that are consistent with the theme of the episode. Each recipe is tested 40-60 times before appearing on the show or in the books, at an average cost of $10,000; they also have a network of 35,000 people who have volunteered to test them. For broadcast, each recipe is presented by a test cook to one of the hosts, Julia Collin Davison or Bridget Lancaster, who walk through recipe steps, explain common problems that can occur when cooking it, and explain how to cook it the right way by sharing discoveries made during the testing and the science behind the recipe using instructional graphics. Periodically throughout the episode, other segments are inserted, usually consisting of two or more of the following:

- An Equipment-Testing segment, where Adam Ried reviews kitchen equipment and explains the best product to buy.
- A Tasting Lab segment, where an ingredient or several representative supermarket brands of a prepared food product is run through expert and audience tasting panels and taste-tested by one of the hosts
- A Science Desk segment, discussing the science behind a pertinent technique used in the recipe
- A Quick Tips segment, demonstrating tips and tricks from Cook's Illustrated magazine and viewers' emails and letters
- A Gadget Expert segment, where Lisa McManus reviews and ranks smaller kitchen gadgets

Through season 6 the show was taped in standard definition, 4:3 video; season 7 saw the show switch to widescreen 16:9 video. The high definition version of the show is broadcast as part of PBS HD's master digital schedule, and by some PBS affiliates as part of their normal schedules.

During recording, 26 episodes are videotaped during a three-week period. Six recipes are recorded per day, and there are two recipes demonstrated per episode.

== Cast ==
America's Test Kitchen features several recurring cast members, although not every cast member appears in each episode; usually only one or two of the chefs appears in an episode.

=== Current ===
- Julia Collin Davison, executive food editor for the cookbook division, took over as co-host of America's Test Kitchen alongside Bridget Lancaster with the start of season 17 in January 2017 and took over Kimball's role in introducing the recipes featured in each episode. Collin Davison appeared in most episodes of ATK seasons 1–16, and in all episodes thereafter. Collin Davison continues cooking selected recipes on each episode with the help of others.
- Bridget Lancaster, executive food editor for television, radio and new media, appeared as a regular cast member in seasons 1–16 and joined Collin Davison as host in all episodes beginning in season 17. Lancaster continues to cook through select recipes on new episodes alongside other cast members.
- Jack Bishop, Chief Creative Officer for ATK, appears in most episodes hosting the Tasting Lab segment. In the Tasting Lab, he describes a tasting panel's opinions on different brands of the food or ingredient in question, as Kimball, Lancaster or Davison tastes several of the items blind. After Lancaster or Collin Davison provides their thoughts on the different varieties, Bishop reveals the brands that Kimball, Lancaster or Collin Davison tasted and compares their thoughts to those of the tasting panel. Bishop also hosts the Cook's Illustrated podcast.
- Dan Souza joined the cast in 2013, appearing as a cook and sometimes in the role of science expert. In 2017, Souza became editor-in-chief of Cook's Illustrated magazine.
- Adam Ried appears in most episodes as the host of the Equipment Corner segment, where he shows several brands of a piece of kitchen equipment and often asks Lancaster or Collin Davison to use several of the items or eat food prepared with different brands. In the end, he identifies the test kitchen's preferred brand and demonstrates its key features. For particularly expensive items, he often identifies a best buy: an item that was ranked highly but is significantly less expensive than the top brand. Occasionally the Equipment Corner segment does not focus on a single piece of equipment; instead, a "buy it/don't buy it" format is used to pick the best items among newer kitchen gadgets.
- Lisa McManus first appeared as the show's gadget expert in season 10, reviewing smaller kitchen gadgets in short segments. She is executive editor on the ATK Reviews team, which conducts equipment testing and ingredient tasting reviews.
- Odd Todd (Todd Rosenberg) designs animations for the Science Desk segment, illustrating such concepts as flambé, brining, marinating vs. dry spice rubs, and whether plastic or wooden cutting boards are better for overall kitchen hygiene. His segments made their debut in season 5 but were replaced by non-animated segments with Jeremy Sauer in season 6. The animations returned for season 7, interspersed with non-animated science segments done by Kimball and Sauer.
- Rebecca "Becky" Hays, Dan Souza, Keith Dresser, Erin McMurrer and Lan Lam are the chefs who explain and prepare the recipes in each episode as the host watches and comments. Usually only one or two of the chefs will appear in an episode. Hays joined the permanent cast in season 5, Souza in season 15, Dresser and McMurrer in season 17, and Lam in season 19.

=== Former ===
- Christopher Kimball, the show's host for seasons 1–16, was the co-founder, editor and publisher of America's Test Kitchen and its associated magazine, book, television and radio programs from their inception through 2016. Kimball and ATK parted company in the fall of 2016 over a contract dispute.
- Elle Simone joined the program in 2016 as the first Black cast member. She was featured in regular cooking segments until her death from ovarian cancer in 2026.
- John "Doc" Willoughby hosted the Science Desk segment in the show's first two seasons but was gradually phased out during season 3. After he became executive editor of Gourmet magazine, there was no Science Desk segment for two seasons. Willoughby returned to America's Test Kitchen in 2010, though he left again.
- Kay Rentschler was a regular cast member on season 1. He moved to the positions of Culinary Producer and Executive Chef by season 2 and appeared in only one episode that season, before leaving the show by Season 3.
- Guy Crosby was the science adviser for America's Test Kitchen. He began working for Cook's Illustrated as a consulting editor in early 2005.

== Episodes ==
Season	Episodes	Originally released	
Season	Episodes	First released	Last released
1	13	August 4, 2001	October 27, 2001
2	26	January 5, 2002	June 29, 2002
3	26	January 4, 2003	June 28, 2003
4	26	January 3, 2004	June 26, 2004
5	26	January 1, 2005	June 25, 2005
6	26	January 7, 2006	July 1, 2006
7	26	January 6, 2007	June 30, 2007
8	26	January 5, 2008	June 28, 2008
9	26	January 3, 2009	June 27, 2009
10	26	January 2, 2010	June 26, 2010
11	26	January 8, 2011	June 25, 2011
12	26	January 7, 2012	June 30, 2012
13	26	January 5, 2013	June 29, 2013
14	26	January 4, 2014	June 28, 2014
15	26	January 3, 2015	July 18, 2015
16	26	January 2, 2016	July 30, 2016
17	26	January 7, 2017	July 1, 2017
18	26	January 6, 2018	June 30, 2018
19	26	January 5, 2019	August 3, 2019
20	26	January 4, 2020	June 27, 2020
21	26	January 2, 2021	June 26, 2021
22	26	January 8, 2022	July 2, 2022
23	26	January 7, 2023	July 1, 2023
24	26	January 7, 2024	August 3, 2024
25	26	September 21, 2024	May 24, 2025
26	26	September 20, 2025	May 23, 2026

== Other media ==
=== Books ===
Date Published	Title	Description	New York Times Best Seller
February 15, 2011	Slow Cooker Revolution	One Test Kitchen. 30 Slow Cookers. 200 Amazing Recipes.	Yes
March 15, 2013	Pressure Cooker Perfection	100 Foolproof Recipes That Will Change the Way You Cook	
September 10, 2013	Slow Cooker Revolution Volume 2	The Easy-Prep Edition	
October 15, 2013	The America's Test Kitchen Cooking School Cookbook	Everything You Need to Know to Become a Great Cook.	
March 4, 2014	The How Can it Be Gluten Free Cookbook	Revolutionary Techniques. Groundbreaking Recipes.	Yes
October 13, 2014	100 Recipes	The Absolute Best Ways To Make The True Essentials	
October 20, 2014	The Cook's Illustrated Meat Book	The Game-Changing Guide That Teaches You How to Cook Meat and Poultry with 425 Bulletproof Recipes	
October 27, 2014	The New Family Cookbook	All-New Edition of the Best-Selling Classic with 1,100 New Recipes	
January 1, 2015	Healthy Slow Cooker Revolution	One Test Kitchen. 40 Slow Cookers. 200 Fresh Recipes.	
March 1, 2015	The Complete Vegetarian Cookbook	A Fresh Guide to Eating Well with 700 Foolproof Recipes	Yes
April 15, 2015	The Best Mexican Recipes	Kitchen-Tested Recipes Put the Real Flavors of Mexico Within Reach	
August 11, 2015	Cook's Country Eats Local	150 Regional Recipes You Should Be Making No Matter Where You Live	
October 13, 2015	The How Can It Be Gluten-Free Cookbook Volume 2	New Whole-Grain Flour Blend. 75+ Dairy-Free Recipes.	
October 27, 2015	The Complete America's Test Kitchen TV Show Cookbook 2001-2016	Every Recipe from the Hit TV Show with Product Ratings and a Look Behind the Scenes	
February 23, 2016	Cook It in Cast Iron	Kitchen-Tested Recipes for the One Pan That Does It All	
April 26, 2016	Master of the Grill	Foolproof Recipes, Top-Rated Gadgets, Gear & Ingredients Plus Clever Test Kitchen Tips & Fascinating Food Science	
April 26, 2016	Foolproof Preserving	A Guide to Small Batch Jams, Jellies, Pickles, Condiments, and More	
August 23, 2016	Naturally Sweet	Bake All Your Favorites with 30% to 50% Less Sugar	
September 6, 2016	Bread Illustrated	A Step-By-Step Guide to Achieving Bakery-Quality Results At Home	
October 4, 2016	Cook's Science	How to Unlock Flavor in 50 of our Favorite Ingredients	Yes
October 4, 2016	The Best of America's Test Kitchen 2017	The Year's Best Recipes, Equipment Reviews, and Tastings	
October 25, 2016	What Good Cooks Know	20 Years of Test Kitchen Expertise in One Essential Handbook	
December 27, 2016	The Complete Mediterranean Cookbook	500 Vibrant, Kitchen-Tested Recipes for Living and Eating Well Every Day	
April 4, 2017	Vegan for Everybody	Foolproof Plant-Based Recipes for Breakfast, Lunch, Dinner, and In-Between	
July 11, 2017	The Complete Make-Ahead Cookbook	From Appetizers to Desserts 500 Recipes You Can Make in Advance	
November 28, 2017	The Complete Cooking for Two Cookbook	650 Recipes for Everything You'll Ever Want to Make	
February 6, 2018	How to Roast Everything	A Game-Changing Guide to Building Flavor in Meat, Vegetables, and More	
February 27, 2018	Just Add Sauce	A Revolutionary Guide to Boosting the Flavor of Everything You Cook	
March 27, 2018	The Perfect Cake	Your Ultimate Guide to Classic, Modern, and Whimsical Cakes	
April 17, 2018	Multicooker Perfection	Cook it Fast or Cook it Slow - You Decide	
April 17, 2018	Dinner Illustrated	175 Meals Ready in 1 Hour or Less	
August 28, 2018	The Complete Cook's Country TV Show Season 11 Edition	Every Recipe, Every Ingredient Tasting, Every Equipment Rating From All 11 Seasons	
September 4, 2018	All Time Best Brunch	Standout recipes and time-tested tips	
September 4, 2018	All Time Best Dinners for Two	Leave it to America's Test Kitchen to help you get a perfectly scaled dinner for two on the table - no guesswork required	
September 25, 2018	The New Essentials Cookbook	A Modern Guide to Better Cooking	
September 25, 2018	Sous Vide For Everybody	The Easy, Foolproof Cooking Technique That's Sweeping the World	
October 2, 2018	The Best of America's Test Kitchen TV Show Cookbook 2001-2019	Every Recipe From The Hit TV Show With Product Ratings and a Look Behind the Scenes.	
October 16, 2018	The Complete Cookbook for Young Chefs	100 kid-tested, kid approved recipes for every kid chef	Yes
October 16, 2018	123 the Farm and Me	Readers will have fun counting along as they go from the farm, to the store, to their kitchen, to their table to share a dinner	
October 16, 2018	A is for Artichoke	Words and definitions that are sure to delight babies and foodies alike	
October 23, 2018	Cook's Illustrated Revolutionary Recipes	Groundbreaking techniques. Compelling voices. One-of-a-kind Recipes.	
November 6, 2018	The Complete Diabetes Cookbook	The Healthy Way to Eat the Foods You Love	
December 4, 2018	Cook it in Your Dutch Oven	150 Foolproof Recipes Tailor-Made for Your Kitchen's Most Versatile Pot	
January 29, 2019	Air Fryer Perfection	From Crispy Fries and Juicy Steaks to Perfect Vegetables, What to cook & How to Get the Best Results	
February 12, 2019	How to Braise Everything	Classic, Modern, and Global Dishes Using a Time-Honored Technique	
March 5, 2019	Vegetable Illustrated	An Inspiring Guide with 700+ Kitchen-Tested Recipes	
April 2, 2019	The Complete Baby and Toddler Cookbook	The Very Best Purees, Finger Foods, and Toddler Meals for Happy Families	
April 30, 2019	The Ultimate Burger	Plus DIY Condiments, Sides, and Boozy Milkshakes	
May 14, 2019	Spiced	Unlock the Power of Spices to Transform Your Cooking	
June 11, 2019	Instant Pot Ace Blender Cook Book	Foolproof Recipes for the Blender That Also Cooks	
August 27, 2019	The Complete Cook's Country TV Show Season 12 Edition	Every Recipe, Every Ingredient Testing, Every Equipment Rating From All 11 Seasons	
September 3, 2019	Stir Crack Whisk Bake	A Little Book about Little Cakes	
September 3, 2019	Cookies for Santa	The Story of How Santa's Favorite Cookie Saved Christmas	
September 10, 2019	The Perfect Pie	Your Ultimate Guide to Classic and Modern Pies, Tarts, Galettes, and More	
October 1, 2019	The Complete Baking Book for Young Chefs	100+ Sweet & Savory Recipes That You'll Love To Bake, Share & Eat!	Yes
October 8, 2019	How to Cocktail	Recipes and Techniques for Building the Best Drinks	
November 5, 2019	Side Dish Bible	1001 Perfect Recipes for Every Vegetable, Rice, Grain, and Bean Dish You Will Ever Need	
December 17, 2019	Bowls	Vibrant Recipes with Endless Possibilities	
December 31, 2019	Mediterranean Instant Pot	Easy, Inspired Meals for Eating Well	
January 28, 2020	Big Flavors from Italian America	Family-Style Favorites from Coast to Coast	
January 28, 2020	Everything Chocolate	A Decadent Collection of Morning Pastries, Nostalgic Sweets, and Showstopping Desserts	
March 3, 2020	My First Cookbook	Fun recipes to cook together	Yes
March 31, 2020	Easy Everyday Keto	Healthy Kitchen-Perfected Recipes	
April 7, 2020	100 Techniques	Master a Lifetime of Cooking Skills, from Basic to Bucket List	
April 21, 2020	The Complete Summer Cookbook	Beat the Heat with 400 Recipes that Make the Most of Summer's Bounty	
May 5, 2020	Foolproof Fish	Modern Recipes for Everyone, Everywhere	
September 1, 2020	Cooking for One	Scaled Recipes, No-Waste Solutions, and Time-Saving Tips for Cooking for Yourself	
October 27, 2020	Meat Illustrated	A Foolproof Guide to Understanding and Cooking with Cuts of All Kinds	
October 27, 2020	The Complete America's Test Kitchen TV Show Cookbook 2001-2021	Every Recipe	
November 3, 2020	Complete One Pot Cookbook	400 Complete Meals	
November 17, 2020	How Can It Be Gluten Free Cookbook Collection	350+ Groundbreaking Recipes for All Your Favorites	
December 1, 2020	Complete Plant-Based Cookbook	500 Inspired, Flexible Recipes for Eating Well without Meat	
October 5, 2021	The Complete America's Test Kitchen TV Show Cookbook 2001-2022	Every Recipe	

=== Radio shows ===
In 2012, America's Test Kitchen Radio was launched, with series creator Christopher Kimball as host. Kimball described the program as featuring "all-new shows with new recipes, new interviews, new call-ins, and new feature segments." Following his departure from the TV program, he continued to host the radio show until 2016 when it was discontinued.

== Awards ==
Year	Title	Award
2016	America's Test Kitchen	Daytime Emmy Award Nomination: Outstanding Culinary Program
2012	America's Test Kitchen	Daytime Emmy Award Winner: Outstanding Directing in a Lifestyle/Culinary Program
2011	America's Test Kitchen	Daytime Emmy Award Nomination: Outstanding Lifestyle/Culinary Host
2011	America's Test Kitchen	Daytime Emmy Award Nomination: Outstanding Culinary Program
2010	America's Test Kitchen	Daytime Emmy Award Nomination: Outstanding Culinary Program
