= List of Scariest Places on Earth episodes =

This is a complete list of episodes of Scariest Places on Earth, an American paranormal documentary reality television series that originally aired from October 23, 2000 to October 29, 2006 on Fox Family. Hosted by actress Linda Blair, the series visited a wide array of reportedly haunted locations around the world, giving historical context, interviews, and reality TV-style segments featuring people staying overnight in the locations.

== Series overview ==
Season	Episodes	Originally released		
Season	Episodes	First released	Last released	Network
1	5	October 23, 2000	October 27, 2000	Fox Family
2	25	March 26, 2001	October 26, 2001	Fox Family
3	8	April 21, 2002	October 30, 2002	Fox Family
4	4	October 22, 2005	October 23, 2005	Fox Family
5	2	October 29, 2006	October 29, 2006	Fox Family

== Episodes ==
=== Season 1 ===
No. overall	No. in season	Title	Location(s)	Original release date
1	1	"Satan's Dormitory"	City of Athens, Ohio, U.S.: • Athens Lunatic Asylum • Wilson Hall, Ohio University; Villisca Murder House in Villisca, Iowa; Haydon Bridge, Northumberland, England	October 23, 2000
2	2	"Eastern State Penitentiary"	Eastern State Penitentiary in Philadelphia, Pennsylvania, U.S.; New Jersey Pine Barrens, U.S.; Paris Catacombs in Paris, France	October 24, 2000
3	3	"Fortress of Blood"	Walls of Genoa in Genoa, Italy; New London Ledge Light in New London, Connecticut, U.S.; Amargosa Opera House in Death Valley, California, U.S.; Metropolitan State Hospital in Waltham, Massachusetts, U.S. (Note: The location is presented as an "unnamed mental hospital" in New England, but it is in fact the Metropolitan State Hospital in Waltham, Massachusetts.)	October 25, 2000
4	4	"Ghost Ship"	Alcatraz Island in San Francisco, California, U.S.; Edinburgh Vaults in Edinburgh, Scotland; RMS Queen Mary in Long Beach, California, U.S.; Legend of Rene Rondolia in Savannah, Georgia, U.S.	October 26, 2000
5	5	"Chillingham"	Chillingham Castle in Northumberland, England	October 27, 2000

=== Season 2 ===
No. overall	No. in season	Title	Location(s)	Original release date
6	1	"Curse of the Roman Gladiators"	Colosseum in Rome, Italy; Oranmore Castle in Oranmore, Ireland; Bunnyman's Bridge in Fairfax County, Virginia, U.S.	March 26, 2001
7	2	"Village of the Damned"	McPike Mansion in Alton, Illinois, U.S.; Fort Pulaski in Savannah, Georgia, U.S.; Catacombe dei Cappuccini in Palermo, Sicily	March 27, 2001
8	3	"White Witch"	Rose Hall Great House in Montego Bay, Jamaica; Mansfield Reformatory in Mansfield, Ohio, U.S.	March 28, 2001
9	4	"Cemetery of the Angry Undead"	Dorsey Mansion in Abbott, New Mexico, U.S.; Greyfriars Kirkyard in Edinburgh, Scotland; Leap Castle in Coolderry, Ireland	March 29, 2001
10	5	"Magnolia Lane Plantation"	Magnolia Lane Plantation in Derry, Louisiana, U.S.	March 30, 2001
11	6	"A House Possessed"	Schilling family house in Johnstown, Missouri, U.S.; Charleville Castle in Tullamore, Ireland; Westminster Hall and Burying Ground in Baltimore, Maryland, U.S.; Old Bell Hotel in Malmesbury, Wiltshire, England	April 6, 2001
12	7	"Charleville: Haunted Irish Castle Dare"	Charleville Castle in Tullamore, Ireland	April 13, 2001
13	8	"Lair of the Wickedest Man on Earth"	La Purisima Mission in Lompoc, California, U.S.; Abbey of Thelema in Cefalù, Italy; Sloss Furnaces in Birmingham, Alabama, U.S.	April 20, 2001
14	9	"Lucedio: Cursed Italian Monastery Dare"	Lucedio Abbey in Province of Vercelli, Italy	April 27, 2001
15	10	"Exorcism"	Haydon Bridge, Northumberland, England	May 4, 2001
16	11	"Ornamore Castle"	Oranmore Castle in Oranmore, Ireland	May 11, 2001
17	12	"Haunted Voodoo Plantation"	Magnolia Lane Plantation in Derry, Louisiana, U.S.	May 18, 2001
18	13	"Haunting the Heartland"	Schilling family house in Johnstown, Missouri, U.S.; Village of Alton, Illinois, U.S.: • Alton Military Prison • Mineral Springs Hotel • First Unitarian Church; Villisca Axe Murder House in Villisca, Iowa, U.S.	May 25, 2001
19	14	"Urban Legends"	Bunnyman Bridge in Fairfax County, Virginia, U.S.; Ohio University in Athens, Ohio, U.S.; New Jersey Pine Barrens, U.S.; New London Ledge Light in New London, Connecticut, U.S.	June 16, 2001
20	15	"Rituals of Evil"	Lucedio Abbey in Province of Vercelli, Italy; Rose Hall Great House in Montego Bay, Jamaica; Walls of Genoa in Genoa, Italy	June 23, 2001
21	16	"Lost Souls"	Capuchin Catacombs in Palermo, Sicily	July 6, 2001
22	17	"Castle of Cursed Souls"	Dalhousie Castle in Midlothian, Scotland	July 20, 2001
23	18	"Island of No Return: The Venice Dare"	Poveglia, Venice, Italy	August 19, 2001
24	19	"The Untold Stories"	Poveglia, Venice, Italy	August 24, 2001
25	20	"Return to Chillingham"	Chillingham Castle in Northumberland, England	October 21, 2001
26	21	"Return to Lucedio: The Cursed Italian Monastery Dare"	Lucedio Abbey in Province of Vercelli, Italy	October 22, 2001
27	22	"Contagion of Fear"	Waverly Hills Sanatorium in Louisville, Kentucky, U.S.; Unnamed castle in Scotland; Seul Choix Light in Schoolcraft County, Michigan, U.S.	October 23, 2001
28	23	"Return to Charleville: The Haunted Irish Castle Dare"	Charleville Castle in Tullamore, Ireland	October 24, 2001
29	24	"Goldfield Ghost Hunt"	Goldfield Hotel in Goldfield, Nevada, U.S.; Mummies of Guanajuato, Mexico; Montpelier Hill in Dublin, Ireland; Hot Lake Hotel in Hot Lake, Oregon, U.S.	October 25, 2001
30	25	"A Night in Dracula's Castle: The Transylvania Dare"	Bran Castle in Bran, Brașov, Romania	October 26, 2001

=== Season 3 ===
No. overall	No. in season	Title	Location(s)	Original release date
31	1	"Return to Romania Dare"	Bran Castle in Bran, Brașov, Romania	April 21, 2002
32	2	"Woodchester Mansion"	Woodchester Mansion in Woodchester, Gloucestershire, England	October 20, 2002
33	3	"Return to Transylvania"	Hunedoara Castle in Hunedoara, Romania	October 21, 2002
34	4	"Return to Magnolia Lane"	Magnolia Lane Plantation in Derry, Louisiana, U.S.	October 21, 2002
35	5	"Best of Scariest Places"	Various locations	October 22, 2002
36	6	"Castle of the Blood Countess"	Čachtice Castle in Čachtice, Slovakia	October 29, 2002
37	7	"Legendary Haunts"	West Virginia State Penitentiary in Moundsville, West Virginia, U.S.; Dixmont State Hospital in Pittsburgh, Pennsylvania, U.S.; USS Hornet in Alameda, California, U.S.	October 29, 2002
38	8	"Waverly Hills Sanatorium"	Seul Choix Light in Schoolcraft County, Michigan, U.S.; Balgonie Castle in Milton of Balgonie, Scotland; Waverly Hills Sanatorium in Louisville, Kentucky, U.S.	October 30, 2002

=== Season 4 ===
No. overall	No. in season	Title	Location(s)	Original release date
39	1	"Fear Force: Thunderbird"	Thunderbird Lodge in Lake Tahoe, Nevada, U.S.	October 22, 2005
40	2	"Monahan Family Castle Transylvania Dare"	Poenari Castle in Arefu, Romania	October 22, 2005
41	3	"Best of Scariest Places"	Various locations	October 22, 2005
42	4	"Urban Legends II"	Lizzie Borden House in Fall River, Massachusetts, U.S.; Shawnee Amusement Park in Lake Shawnee, West Virginia, U.S.; Cheesman Park in Denver, Colorado, U.S.	October 23, 2005

=== Season 5 ===
No. overall	No. in season	Title	Location(s)	Original release date
43	1	"Castle of the Blood Countess"	Báthory Castle in Șimleu Silvaniei, Romania	October 29, 2006
