= Gretna Historic District =

Historic district in Louisiana, United States

- U.S. National Register of Historic Places
- U.S. Historic district
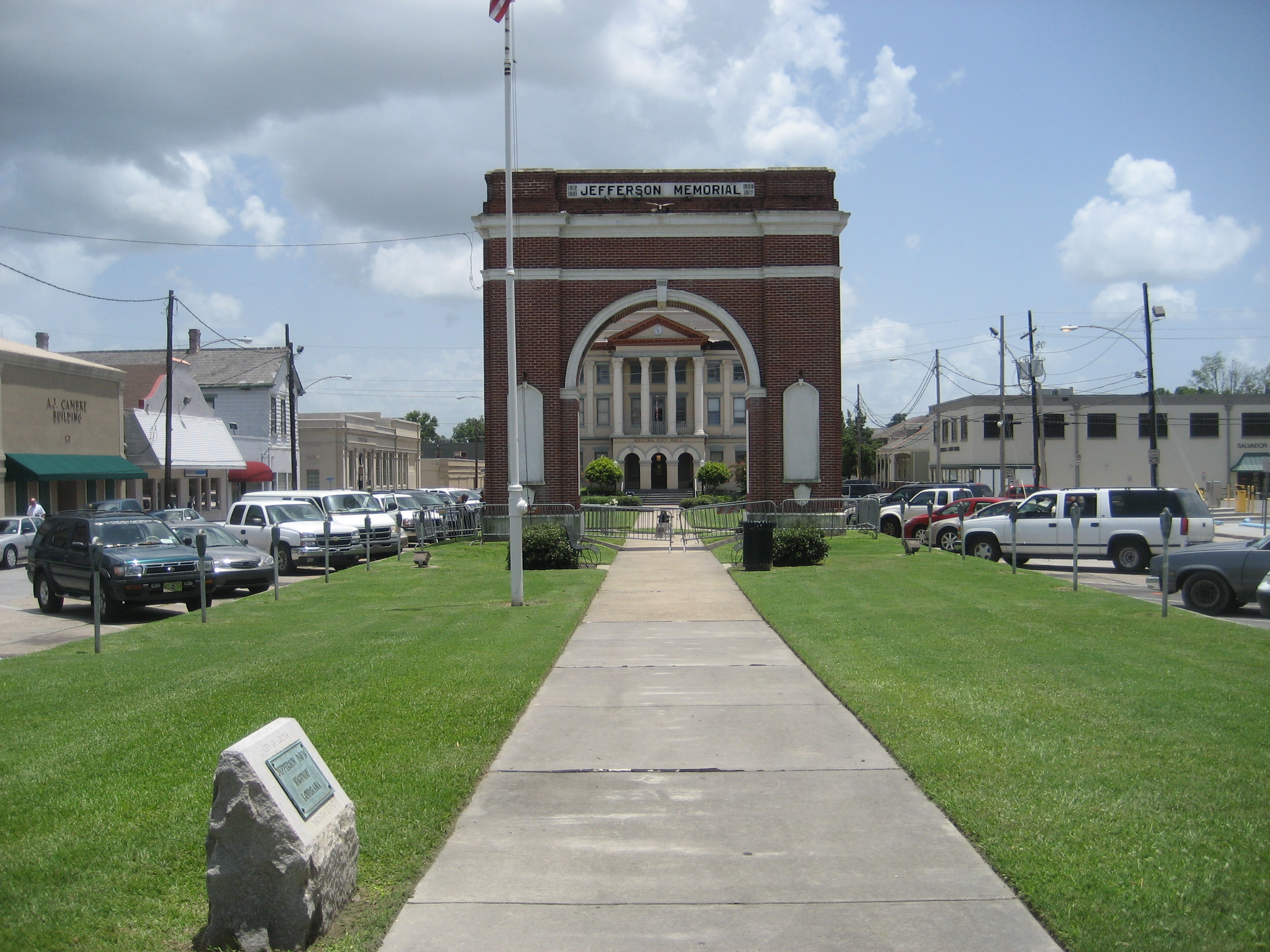
- Jefferson Memorial Arch and view towards the City Hall.

- Location within Louisiana Location within the United States

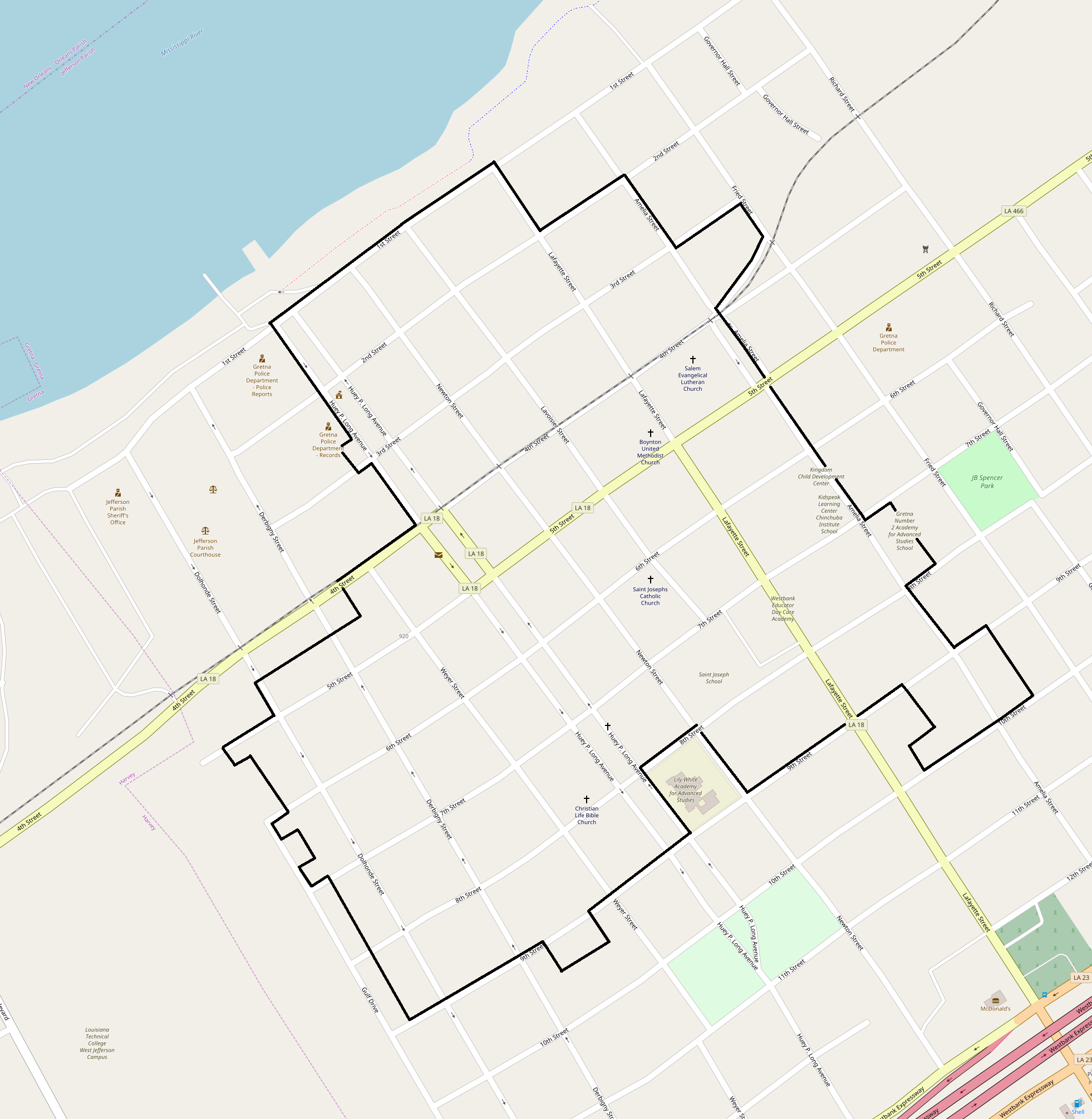
- Location: Roughly bounded by 1st Street, Amelia Street, 9th Street, Gulf Drive, 4th Street and Huey P. Long Avenue, Gretna, Louisiana
- Coordinates: 29°54′56″N 90°03′47″W
- Area: 130 acres (53 ha)
- NRHP reference No.: 85000954
- Added to NRHP: May 2, 1985

Gretna Historic District is a historic district in downtown Gretna, Louisiana, United States, roughly bounded by 1st Street, Amelia Street, 9th Street, Gulf Drive, 4th Street and Huey P. Long Avenue.

The 130-acre (53 ha) area comprises a total of 737 buildings and structures, of which 553 are considered contributing properties, and 4 are also listed on the National Register of Historic Places as individual properties. Building dates vary from c.1845 to 1935 and are mostly creole cottages, shotgun houses, bungalows and corner commercial buildings. Styles vary from the Greek Revival and Italianate of 1845-1879 structures, to the Italianate, Eastlake and Colonial Revival of the 1880-1910 buildings, to the Colonial Revival, 20th century eclectic and bungalow style.

The historic district was listed on the National Register of Historic Places on May 2, 1985.

== Local Landmarks ==
Of the 553 contributing properties of the district, 14 are considered Local Landmarks and are greatly responsible for the overall district architectural quality:

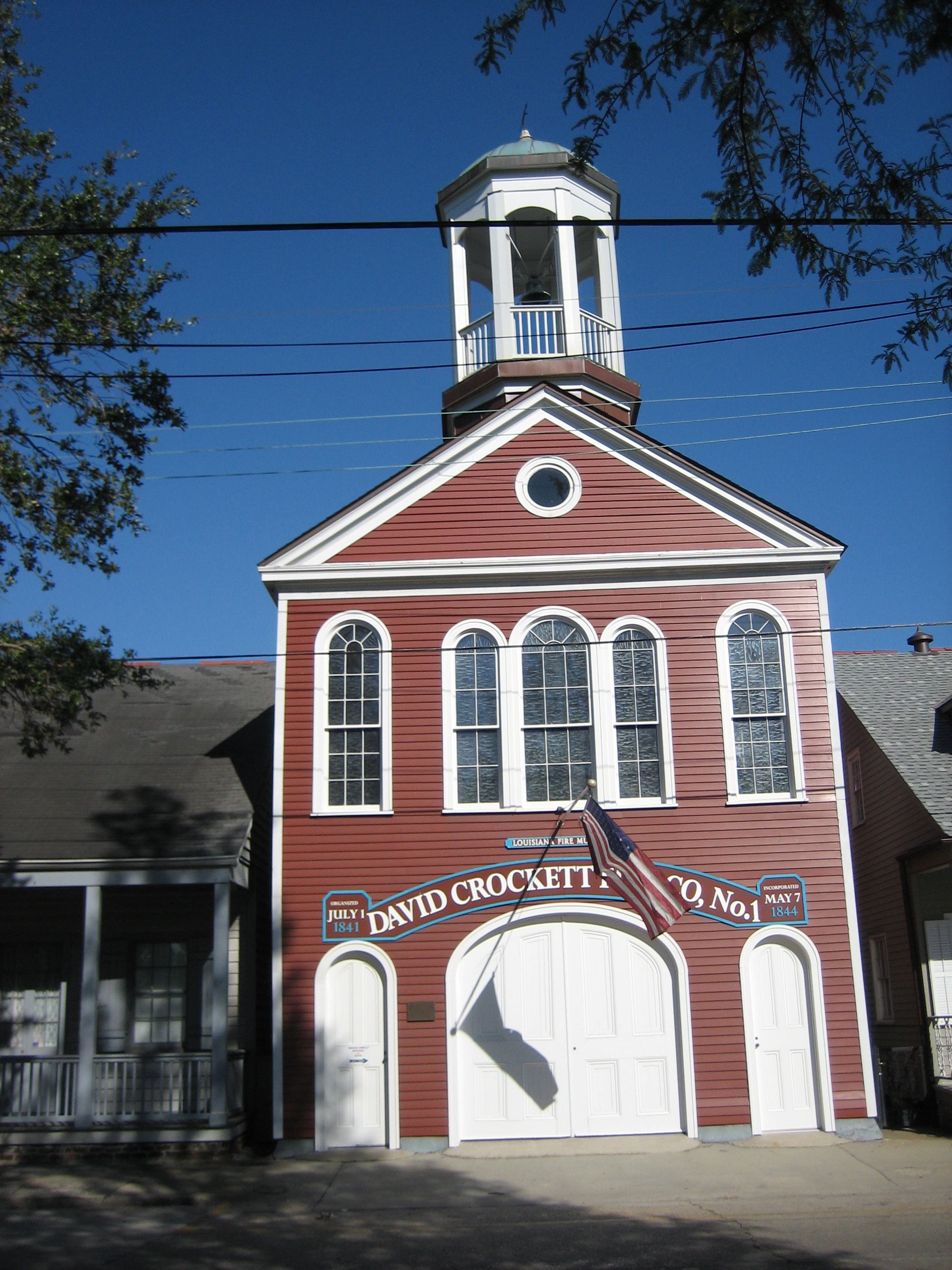
David Crockett Fire Hall at 205 Lafayette Street

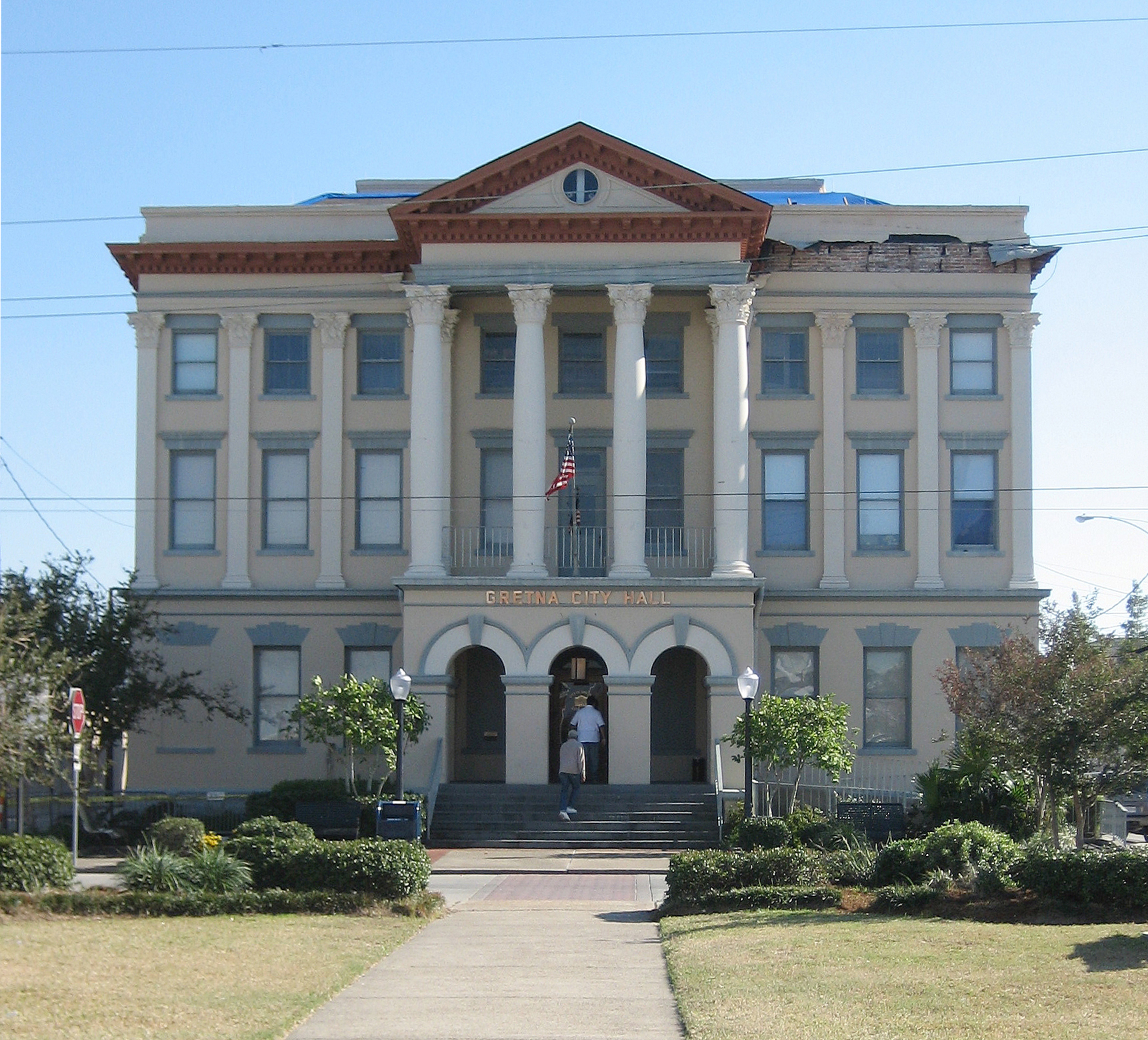
Old Jefferson Parish Courthouse at 740 2nd Street

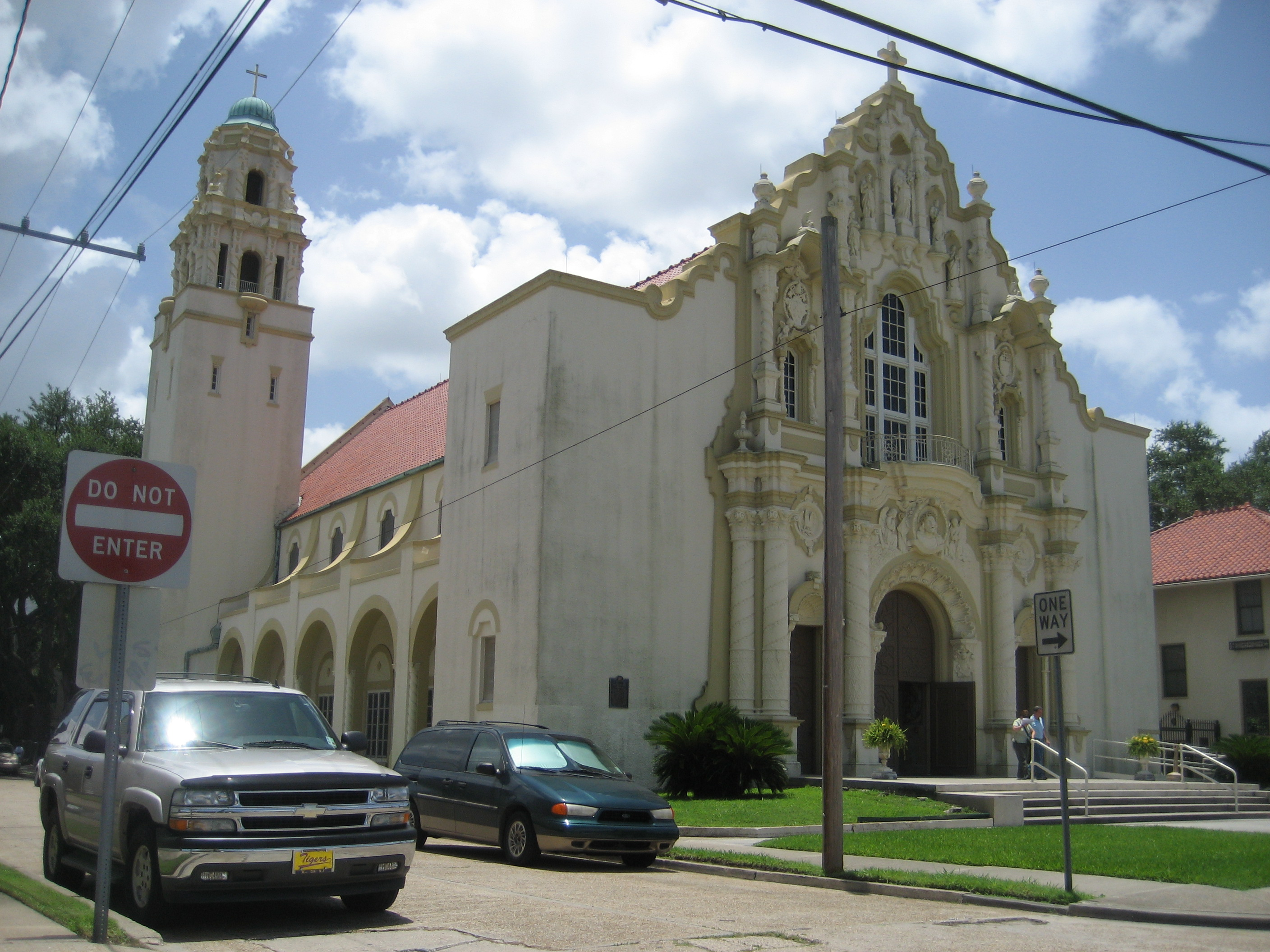
Saint Josephs Roman Catholic Church at 610 6th Street

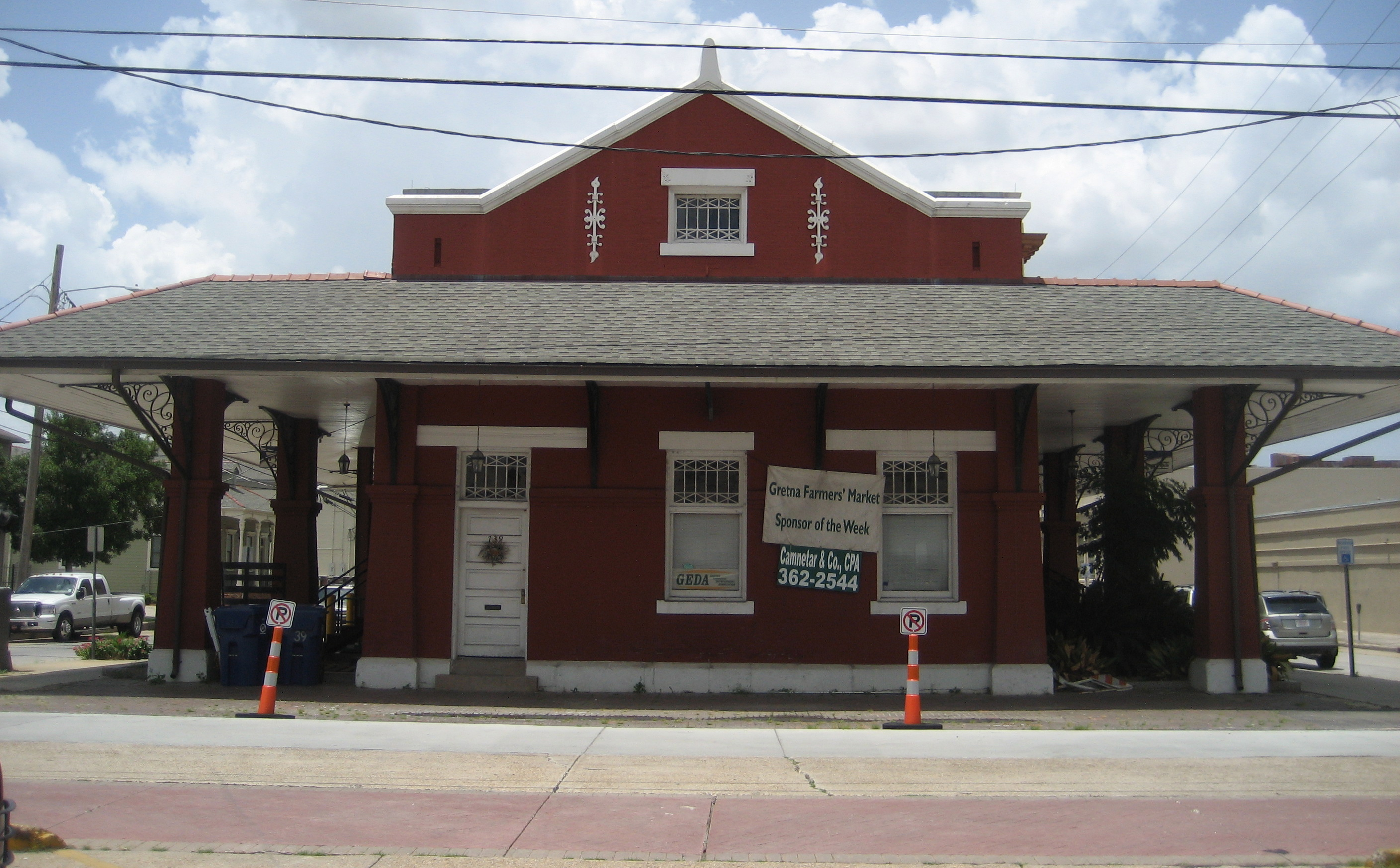
Texas-Pacific Railroad Station at 739 3rd Street

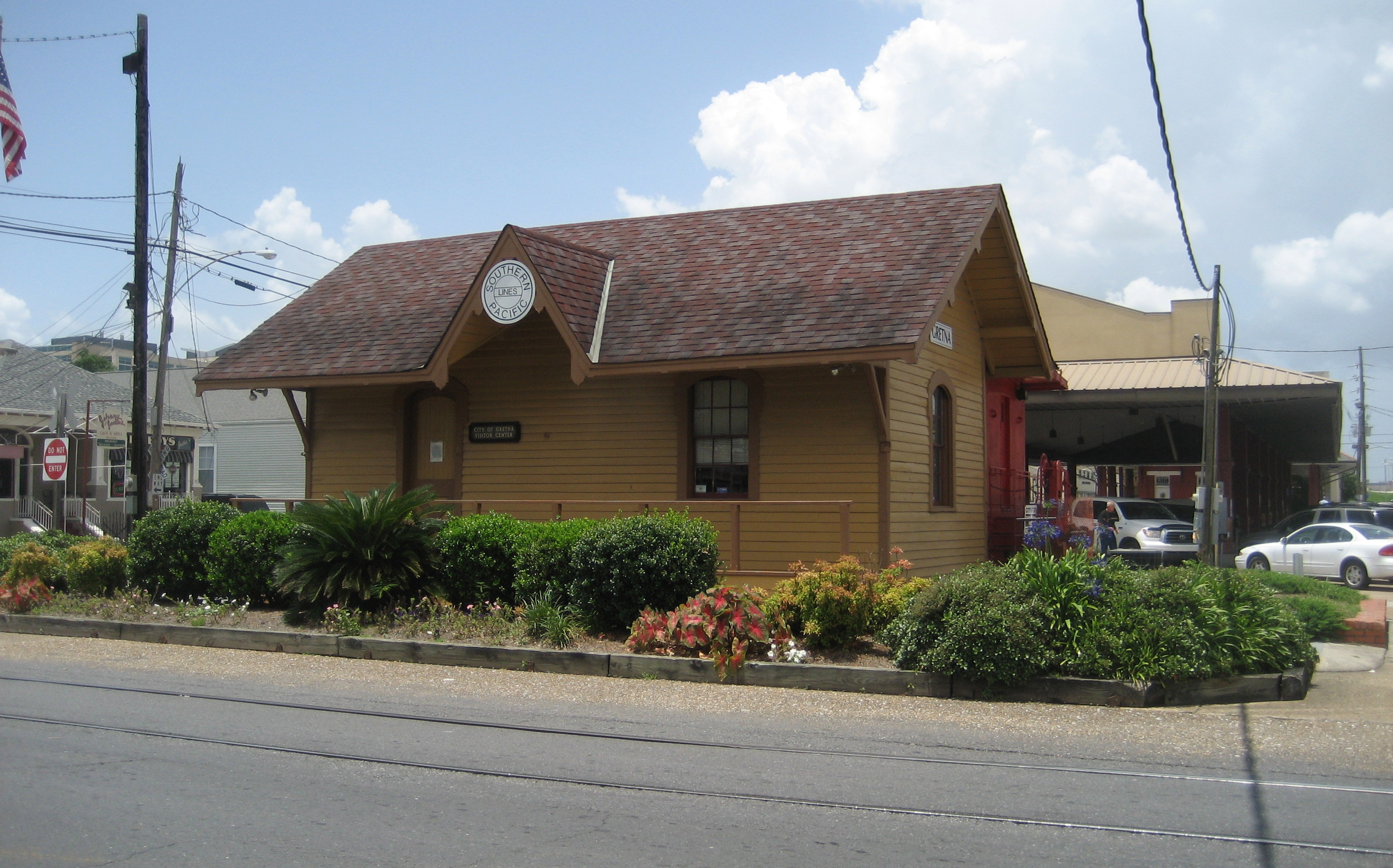
Southern Pacific Depot on 4th Street

- Jefferson Memorial Arch on Huey P. Long Avenue, 29°55′03″N 90°03′58″W, built 1923.
- Old Jefferson Parish Courthouse at 740 2nd Street, 29°55′01″N 90°03′56″W, built 1907. Also individually listed and now hosting the Gretna City Hall.
- Texas-Pacific Railroad Station at 739 3rd Street, 29°54′59″N 90°03′55″W, built c.1910.
- Southern Pacific Depot on 4th Street, 29°54′57″N 90°03′53″W, built 1906. Now hosting the Gretna Visitor Center.
- Large villa at 720 Huey P. Long Avenue, 29°54′46″N 90°03′46″W, built c.1930.
- Raised bungalow at 225 Newton Street, 29°55′02″N 90°03′52″W, built c.1915.
- Commercial building at 600 2nd Street, 29°55′05″N 90°03′51″W, built c.1890.
- Saint Josephs Roman Catholic Church at 610 6th Street, 29°54′53″N 90°03′42″W, built 1926. Also individually listed.
- House at 216 Lafayette Street, 29°55′06″N 90°03′47″W, built c.1850.
- Lee Hall at 301 Lavoisier Street, 29°55′03″N 90°03′48″W, built c.1910. No more standing.
- Most Holy Sacrament College at 614 7th Street, 29°54′50″N 90°03′40″W, built 1899. Also individually listed.
- David Crockett Fire Hall at 205 Lafayette Street, 29°55′08″N 90°03′47″W, built 1859. Also individually listed.
- Gretna Elementary School at 701 Amelia Street, 29°54′55″N 90°03′30″W, built c.1925.
- Mansion at 919 Amelia Street, 29°54′49″N 90°03′26″W.

== See also ==
- National Register of Historic Places listings in Jefferson Parish, Louisiana
- Old Jefferson Parish Courthouse
- St. Joseph Church-Convent of the Most Holy Sacrament Complex
- David Crockett Fire Hall and Pumper
