= National Register of Historic Places listings in Jefferson Parish, Louisiana =

Location of Jefferson Parish in Louisiana

This is a list of the National Register of Historic Places listings in Jefferson Parish, Louisiana.

This is intended to be a complete list of the properties and districts on the National Register of Historic Places in Jefferson Parish, Louisiana, United States. The locations of National Register properties and districts for which the latitude and longitude coordinates are included below, may be seen in a map.

There are 27 properties and districts listed on the National Register in the parish, and one former listing.

This National Park Service list is complete through NPS recent listings posted January 30, 2026.

== Current listings ==
	Name on the Register	Image	Date listed	Location	City or town	Description
1	Barataria Unit of Jean Lafitte Historical Park Historic District	Barataria Unit of Jean Lafitte Historical Park Historic District	October 15, 1966 (#66000966)	6588 Barataria Boulevard; 29°47′56″N 90°07′24″W	Marrero vicinity	The 1,855 acres (751 ha) area Nature Preserve is roughly bounded by Bayou Coquilles, Bayou des Familles, Bayou Barataria, Bayou Villars, and Lake Salvador.
2	L.J. Bernard Hardware Store	L.J. Bernard Hardware Store	September 22, 2000 (#00001144)	275 Sala Avenue; 29°54′50″N 90°08′36″W	Westwego	Now hosting the Westwego Historical Museum.
3	Conrad A. Buchler House	Conrad A. Buchler House	September 9, 1999 (#99001114)	236 Sala Avenue; 29°54′53″N 90°08′36″W	Westwego	
4	Camp Parapet Powder Magazine	Camp Parapet Powder Magazine	May 24, 1977 (#77000671)	2812 Arlington Street; 29°57′40″N 90°09′20″W	Jefferson	Civil War fortification
5	David Crockett Fire Hall and Pumper	David Crockett Fire Hall and Pumper	January 27, 1983 (#83000510)	205 Lafayette Street; 29°55′08″N 90°03′47″W	Gretna	Historic firehouse, now part of Gretna Historical Society Museum. Also part of Gretna Historic District since its creation on May 2, 1985.
6	Felix-Block Building	Felix-Block Building	July 18, 1985 (#85001587)	303 Williams Boulevard; 29°58′24″N 90°14′49″W	Kenner	Now hosting the Kenner Heritage Hall.
7	Fort Livingston	Fort Livingston	August 30, 1974 (#74000925)	Western end of Grande Terre Island; 29°16′23″N 89°56′43″W	Grand Isle vicinity	Ruins of early 19th century fort
8	Gretna Historic District	Gretna Historic District	May 2, 1985 (#85000954)	Roughly bounded by 1st Street, Amelia Street, 9th Street, Gulf Drive, 4th Street and Huey P. Long Avenue; 29°54′56″N 90°03′47″W	Gretna	
9	Harahan Elementary School	Harahan Elementary School	April 14, 1983 (#83000511)	6723 Jefferson Highway; 29°56′16″N 90°11′47″W	Harahan	
10	Humble Oil Camp Historic District		April 15, 2020 (#100005188)	101-143 Marlin Ln. 29°14′41″N 89°58′43″W	Grand Isle	
11	Kenner Town Hall	Kenner Town Hall	January 23, 1986 (#86000112)	1903 Short Street; 29°58′31″N 90°14′53″W	Kenner	
12	Kerner House	Kerner House	January 28, 2000 (#00000008)	1012 Monroe Street; 29°55′44″N 90°03′03″W	Gretna	
13	Kirby-Adam House		December 4, 2018 (#100003192)	142B Community Ln. 29°14′15″N 89°59′47″W	Grand Isle	
14	Magnolia Lane Plantation House	Magnolia Lane Plantation House	February 13, 1986 (#86000253)	Along River Road (LA 541) at Nine Mile Point; 29°56′59″N 90°09′12″W	Westwego vicinity	Plantation house at Nine Mile Point; originally Fortier Plantation
15	Ed Martin Seafood Company Factory and House	Ed Martin Seafood Company Factory and House	September 29, 2000 (#00001170)	300 and 306 Sala Avenue; 29°54′50″N 90°08′38″W	Westwego	
16	McDonoghville Historic District	McDonoghville Historic District	July 26, 2022 (#100007945)	Roughly bounded by the Crescent City Connection, Jefferson Parish Line, Hancock St., 4th St. extension, Ocean Ave., and the Mississippi R. Trail; 29°55′43″N 90°03′09″W	Gretna	
17	Old Jefferson Parish Courthouse	Old Jefferson Parish Courthouse	January 21, 1983 (#83000512)	740 2nd Street; 29°55′01″N 90°03′56″W	Gretna	Now hosting the Gretna City Hall. Also part of Gretna Historic District since its creation on May 2, 1985.
18	The Oleander Hotel		July 25, 2025 (#100012046)	166-176 Ludwig Lane; 29°14′00″N 89°59′52″W	Grand Isle	
19	Vic Pitre House	Vic Pitre House	August 20, 1998 (#98001080)	476 Sala Avenue; 29°54′40″N 90°08′44″W	Westwego	
20	Poche House		December 4, 2018 (#100003193)	102 Community Ln. 29°14′14″N 89°59′46″W	Grand Isle	
21	Raziano House	Raziano House	August 14, 1998 (#98001058)	913 Minor Street; 29°58′54″N 90°14′45″W	Kenner	
22	Robin House		December 4, 2018 (#100003194)	176 Coulon Riguard Rd. 29°14′03″N 89°59′51″W	Grand Isle	
23	St. Joseph Church-Convent of the Most Holy Sacrament Complex	St. Joseph Church-Convent of the Most Holy Sacrament Complex	April 15, 1983 (#83000513)	Corner of Lavoisier Street and 7th Street; 29°54′52″N 90°03′40″W	Gretna	Also part of Gretna Historic District since its creation on May 2, 1985.
24	Stewart Building	Stewart Building	January 23, 2026 (#100012603)	110 Veterans Memorial Boulevard; 29°59′57″N 90°07′27″W	Metairie	
25	United States Coast Guard Station No. 79		December 4, 2018 (#100003195)	170 Ludwig Ln. 29°14′02″N 89°59′53″W	Grand Isle	
26	Valence House		March 23, 2023 (#100008740)	205 Cemetery Ln. 29°14′11″N 89°59′27″W	Grand Isle	
27	Young Men's Protective League Union Benevolent Association Hall	Young Men's Protective League Union Benevolent Association Hall	January 23, 2026 (#100012604)	1008 S. Causeway Blvd. 29°57′56″N 90°09′25″W	Jefferson	African-American benevolent organization meeting hall and event venue.

== Former listings ==
	Name on the Register	Image	Date listed	Date removed	Location	City or town	Description
1	Old Kenner High School	Old Kenner High School	February 7, 2008 (#08000014)	March 19, 2024	1601 Reverend Richard Wilson Drive; 29°58′30″N 90°15′09″W	Kenner	Building heavily damaged by fire on February 19, 2018.

== See also ==
- List of National Historic Landmarks in Louisiana
- National Register of Historic Places listings in Louisiana
