= Aaron Broussard =

American politician (b.1949)

President of Jefferson Parish, Louisiana
- In office 2003–2010
- Succeeded by: John Young

Personal details
- Born: Aaron Francis Broussard; January 6, 1949 (age 77) Marksville, Louisiana, U.S.
- Party: Democratic
- Education: University of New Orleans (BA); Loyola University New Orleans (JD)

Aaron Francis Broussard (born January 6, 1949) is a former American politician who served as the president, a combined municipal-parish position, of Jefferson Parish, Louisiana, from 2003 to 2010. A Democrat, Broussard became known nationally for appearances he made in the aftermath of Hurricane Katrina.

== Early life and education ==
Broussard was born in Marksville, the seat of Avoyelles Parish in south central Louisiana. He moved to Kenner, a city in Jefferson Parish, in 1958. He earned a Bachelor of Arts degree from the University of New Orleans and a Juris Doctor degree from Loyola University New Orleans in 1973.

== Career ==
In 1974, Broussard was elected to the Jefferson Parish School Board and re-elected in 1976. In 1977, he was elected as a district chairman to the Jefferson Parish Council and re-elected in 1981. He successfully ran for mayor of Kenner in 1982, and he was reelected in 1986, 1990, and 1994. Broussard was elected chairman of the Jefferson Parish Council in 1995, and reelected in 1999.

In 2003, Broussard was elected Jefferson Parish president. He defeated Republican John M. McDonald by a huge margin, 72–28 percent, even though Jefferson Parish is considered a GOP stronghold in Louisiana.

Broussard was president of Parishes Against Coastal Erosion (PACE) and in a June 14, 2005, press release predicted:

With the National Hurricane Center predicting another active hurricane season, PACE President Aaron Broussard said he fears that it is going to take a major storm and significant loss of life before the nation acts responsibly.

=== Hurricane Katrina lawsuit ===
Many Jefferson Parish residents joined in a class action lawsuit against Broussard after he followed a years-old "doomsday plan" in the wake of Hurricane Katrina and evacuated more than 200 drainage pump operators north to Washington Parish. The pumps remained off for more than two days and sections of the parish, including Metairie and Kenner, experienced severe flooding as a result of rain water, backflow from Lake Pontchartrain and flood waters from the broken 17th Street Canal. Broussard defended his actions, saying that he wanted to protect the pump operators' lives, even though some pump operators were willing to stay. Other public officials, such as police and fire departments, did not evacuate. Water department workers also stayed.

=== First Meet the Press appearance ===
The most famous of Broussard's post Katrina interviews was one on the television program Meet the Press. In the course of that interview, he was critical of the disaster-response effort. He finished with a tearful account of the death by drowning of his emergency services manager's mother. Broussard's account of that incident was subsequently shown to be inaccurate, in that the long sequence of telephone calls to the mother that he described as having taken place in the aftermath of the hurricane could not have happened, since she apparently drowned before the dates in question.

In an appearance on Meet the Press three weeks later, Broussard was questioned about his account. He said that the story had been relayed to him by his staff, and that he had chosen not to ask his emergency manager for the exact circumstances of her death.

Broussard and his employees were directly involved in the initial disaster-recovery efforts that followed Hurricane Katrina. On September 4, 2005 he was interviewed on NBC's Meet the Press, still inside his parish. Broussard called the response to Katrina "One of the Worst Abandonments of Americans on American Soil Ever" and went on to say that FEMA had not only failed to meet his parish's need but actively withheld aid and cut his lines of communication:

Three quick examples. We had Wal-Mart deliver three trucks of water. FEMA turned them back. They said we didn’t need them. This was a week ago. FEMA, we had 1,000 gallons of diesel fuel on a Coast Guard vessel docked in my parish. When we got there with our trucks, FEMA says don’t give you the fuel. Yesterday — yesterday — FEMA comes in and cuts all of our emergency communication lines. They cut them without notice. Our sheriff, Harry Lee, goes back in, he reconnects the line. He posts armed guards and said no one is getting near these lines...

after this, Broussard began to break out in tears.

He said:

The guy who runs this building I'm in, Emergency Management, he's responsible for everything. His mother was trapped in St. Bernard nursing home, and every day she called him and said, 'Are you coming, son? Is somebody coming?' And he said, 'Yeah, Momma, somebody's coming to get you. Somebody's coming to get you on Tuesday. Somebody's coming to get you on Wednesday. Somebody's coming to get you on Thursday. Somebody's coming to get you on Friday' — and she drowned on Friday night. She drowned on Friday night. Nobody's coming to get us, nobody's coming to get us. The secretary has promised, everybody's promised. They've had press conferences — I'm sick of the press conferences. For God's sake, shut up and send us somebody!

Other local politicians criticized the way the federal government handled the aftermath of Hurricane Katrina. New Orleans Mayor Ray Nagin and Parish Presidents Junior Rodriguez from St. Bernard and Benny Rousselle from Plaquemines are among the most notable ones.

=== St. Rita nursing home deaths ===
Subsequent news reports identified the son in the story as Tom Rodrigue, Jefferson Parish's emergency services director. Rodrigue's 92-year-old mother, Eva, lived in the St. Rita's nursing home. It appears from a CNN interview with Rodrigue that he made phone calls to the nursing home on Saturday, August 27, 2005, and on Sunday, August 28, 2005, and urged that the home be evacuated. That evacuation did not take place, and at least 30 residents of the nursing home drowned on Monday, August 29, 2005.

A September 19, 2005, MSNBC story quotes Rodrigue as saying, in response to being told about Broussard's statements on Meet the Press, "No, no, that's not true." A Broussard spokesperson described Broussard's statements about Rodrigue's mother on Meet the Press as "a misunderstanding."

=== Second Meet the Press appearance ===
On September 25, 2005, Broussard reappeared on Meet the Press, and host Tim Russert challenged Broussard's account of the tragedy on the basis that his anecdote about the woman in the nursing home contained factual discrepancies noted in the MSNBC story. Broussard did not directly account for those discrepancies, repeating the statement that "this gentleman's mother died on that Friday before I came on the show." In his subsequent remarks, though, he said that:

- The story as related by him in his earlier appearance was the story told to him by his staff.
- Tom Rodrigue was very distraught over his mother's death, and he (Broussard) wasn't inclined to interrogate him as to the specifics because of that.
- Mistakes were made at all levels of the disaster response, including the evacuation of Jefferson Parish pump operators.
- He hadn't had a full night's sleep in the past 30 days, and would be happy to debate someone as to the specifics of his story after having one.

Broussard has never acknowledged making an error in his original appearance though he did give this response:

Sir, with everything I said on Meet the Press, the last punctuation of my statements were the story that I was going to tell in about maybe two sentences. It just got emotional for me, sir.

To date, Broussard's comments with regard to the federal government have not been formally addressed. Broussard was also excluded from the formal investigation conducted into the response to Hurricane Katrina and thus was not called to explain his role in the $3 billion of flood damage to the East Bank of Jefferson Parish.

=== Recall petition ===
On December 6, 2005 the Jefferson Parish Action Committee filed a petition with the Louisiana Secretary of State to recall Broussard and remove him as President of Jefferson Parish.

The group cited numerous lapses in judgment by Broussard both pre and post Katrina, including the following:

- Federal investigators issued grand jury subpoenas to Broussard and 24th District Judge Kernan "Skip" Hand for records of political donations to Hand's campaigns from Bail Bonds Unlimited.
- Broussard ordered the evacuation of pump operators prior to Hurricane Katrina 100 miles (160 km) to Washington Parish. As a consequence the pump operators were not on duty at the pumping stations until 3:30 am August 30, 2005.
- The resulting flooding of Jefferson Parish has been estimated by insurance industry sources at $3 to $5 billion.
- Under emergency powers granted to the Parish President, Broussard appropriated the Meadowcrest hospital to use as a hotel for parish employees. When Meadowcrest notified the parish that it was planning on re-opening the hospital, Broussard moved to block this reopening despite a dire need for both hospital and emergency medical services. He cited his need for hotel accommodations for parish employees. He declined to return control of the hospital, forcing Meadowcrest Hospital to lay off employees and inform over 800 employees that they may face layoffs.
- In four full-page ads in the [Times-Picayune] costing $38,000, Broussard defended his actions taken during Hurricane Katrina, including his decision to evacuate the pump operators. Broussard's spokesman, Greg Buisson, said that the cost of the ads could be reimbursed by FEMA. FEMA spokesman Mike McCormick said that he knew of no category under which the cost of the ads would be reimbursed.
- Broussard also appropriated private property to use for various post hurricane clean up purposes. Several of these property owners sued Jefferson Parish for compensation to repair significant damage to their property caused by parish operations. Broussard acknowledged the damage but told the property owners to collect the debt from FEMA.

The recall campaign obtained over 49,000 signatures, but this was fewer than the 93,000 signatures (1/3 of the registered voters in Jefferson parish) required under Louisiana law.

=== 2008 reelection campaign ===
On May 2, 2007, Allen Leone, a Republican businessman, announced that he was entering the race to challenge Broussard for president of Jefferson Parish.

Broussard won re-election narrowly with 52 percent of the vote over Leone. The East Bank of Jefferson went for Leone while Broussard carried the West Bank.

At the Alliance for Good Government forum Broussard refused to say he would stop taking money from Parish contractors. The alliance instead endorsed Leone but it was not enough to carry him to victory. Broussard resigned his position on January 8, 2010, in the face of a grand jury investigation of his staff.

=== Guilty plea ===
On September 24, 2012, Broussard pleaded guilty in federal court to two felony counts based on payroll fraud involving his ex-wife. On February 15, 2013, he was sentenced to 46 months in prison. He began serving his sentence in May 2013. Citing misconduct within the local U.S. Attorney's Office, Broussard filed a motion asking Judge Hayden Wilson Head Jr. to vacate the conviction or, alternately, his sentence.

== See also ==
- Political effects of Hurricane Katrina
- List of mayors of Kenner, Louisiana
