= 2019 Louisiana lieutenant gubernatorial election =

- October 12, 2019
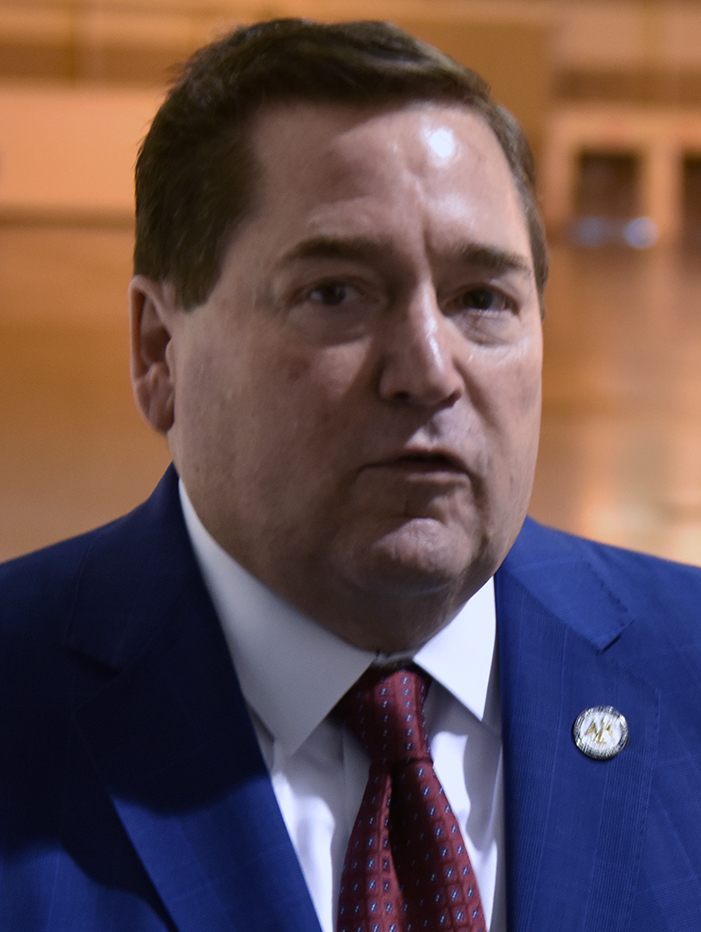

Nominee	Billy Nungesser	Willie Jones
Party	Republican	Democratic
Popular vote	884,309	413,556
Percentage	68.14%	31.86%
- Nungesser: 50–60% 60–70% 70–80% 80–90% >90% Jones: 50–60% 60–70% 70–80% 80–90% >90% Tie: 50% No votes
Lieutenant Governor before election
Billy Nungesser
Republican
Elected Lieutenant Governor
Billy Nungesser
Republican

The 2019 Louisiana lieutenant gubernatorial election was held to elect the Lieutenant Governor of Louisiana. Incumbent Republican Lieutenant Governor Billy Nungesser won re-election to a second term with more than 68% of votes outright in the October 12 jungle primary.

Louisiana is the only state that has a jungle primary system where all candidates appear on the same ballot, regardless of party, and voters may vote for any candidate, regardless of their party affiliation. If no candidate had received an absolute majority of the vote during the primary election on October 12, 2019, a runoff election would have been held on November 16, 2019, between the top two candidates in the primary. (California and Washington have a similar "top two primary" system).

== Candidates ==
=== Republican Party ===
==== Declared ====
- Billy Nungesser, incumbent Lieutenant Governor of Louisiana

=== Democratic Party ===
==== Declared ====
- Willie Jones, activist

== General election ==
=== Results ===
Louisiana lieutenant gubernatorial election, 2019
Party	Candidate	Votes	%	±%
Republican	Billy Nungesser (incumbent)	884,309	68.13%	+12.75%
Democratic	Willie Jones	413,556	31.87%	−12.75%
Total votes		1,297,865	100%	N/A
Republican hold				

==== By congressional district ====
Nungesser won five of six congressional districts.

District	Nungesser	Jones	Representative
1st	80%	20%	Steve Scalise
2nd	36%	64%	Cedric Richmond
3rd	76%	24%	Clay Higgins
4th	69%	31%	Mike Johnson
5th	72%	28%	Ralph Abraham
6th	73%	27%	Garret Graves

== See also ==
- United States elections, 2019
- Lieutenant Governor of Louisiana
