= Kenner Town Hall =

- U.S. National Register of Historic Places
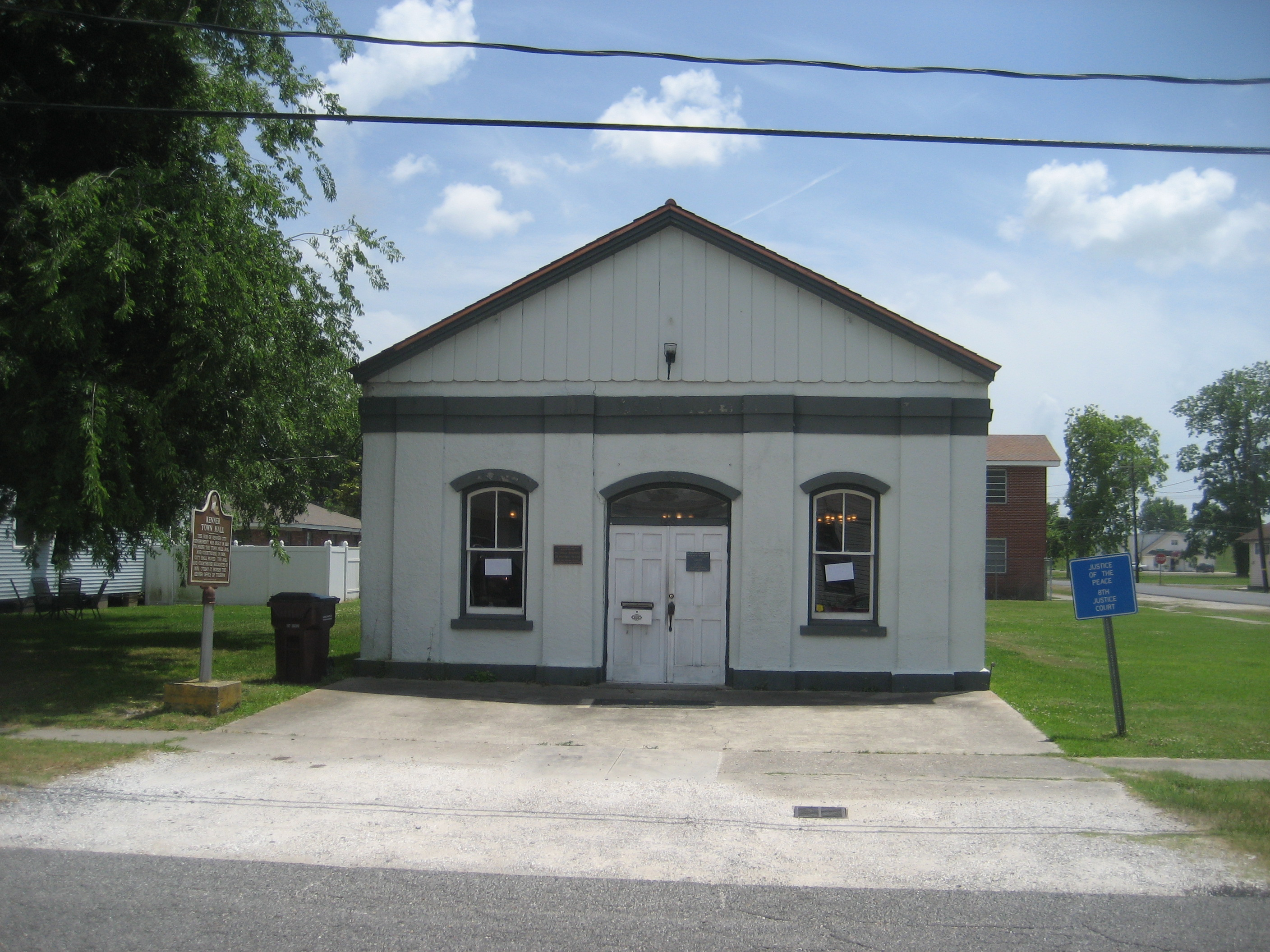
- The building in 2010

- Location within Louisiana
- Location: 1903 Short Street, Kenner, Louisiana
- Coordinates: 29°58′31″N 90°14′53″W
- Area: 0.5 acres (0.20 ha)
- Built: 1925
- Built by: J.E. Louviere
- NRHP reference No.: 86000112
- Added to NRHP: January 23, 1986

The Kenner Town Hall is a historic building in Kenner, Louisiana. It was built in 1925 by J.E. Louviere, and it was the city hall until 1956. It was later used as a courthouse and a jail, and offices for Kenner's tourism department. It has been listed on the National Register of Historic Places since January 23, 1986.

== See also ==
- List of mayors of Kenner, Louisiana
