= Junior Rodriguez =

American politician

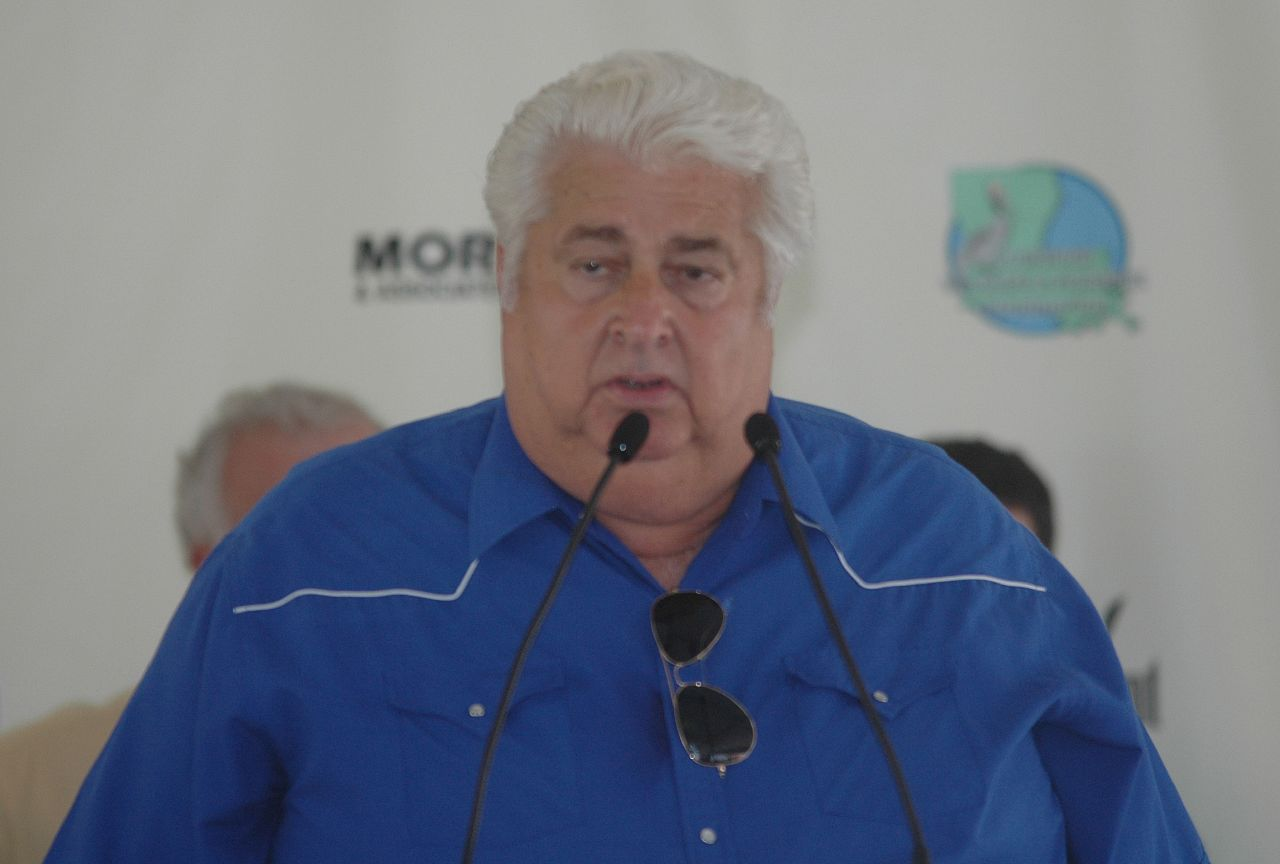
- Henry "Junior" Rodriguez

Personal details
- Born: September 27, 1935 New Orleans, Louisiana
- Died: May 3, 2018 (aged 82) St. Bernard Parish, Louisiana
- Party: Independent
- Profession: Politician

Henry Joseph Rodriguez, Jr. (September 27, 1935 – May 3, 2018), known as Junior Rodriguez, was an American politician from St. Bernard Parish in the Greater New Orleans section of the U.S. state of Louisiana. He was of Isleño descent and was registered as an independent. He served as Councilmember on the St. Bernard Parish Council from 1976 to 2004 and as President of the St. Bernard Parish Council, from 2004 to 2008. St. Bernard Parish is a Louisiana Parish (the equivalent of counties in other states) that is adjacent to New Orleans' Lower Ninth Ward neighborhood.

== During Katrina and it’s aftermaths ==
During Katrina, he and his councilors requested boats and rescued hundreds of people who took refuge on rooftops when the flood occurred. However, Rodriguez reached national fame in the aftermath of Hurricane Katrina, as a regular guest to CNN news show Anderson Cooper 360°. Hurricane Katrina and related levee failures resulted in almost all homes and businesses of St. Bernard Parish being catastrophically flooded. Most had to permanently evacuate their house, and as of early 2006 the majority of the returned population were in the Federal Emergency Management Agency (FEMA) housing trailers.

Known for his matter-of-fact style and his sometimes colorful language, he used his presence on the show to criticize the Federal Emergency Management Agency for the slow pace of the recovery in St. Bernard Parish and asked for a more effective response. Among other aspects, he claimed that FEMA's bureaucratic approach kept victims of the hurricane from getting proper assistance.

Other local politicians criticized the way the federal government handled the aftermath of Hurricane Katrina. New Orleans Mayor Ray Nagin and Parish Presidents Benny Rousselle from Plaquemines and Aaron Broussard from Jefferson are among the most notable ones.

Junior Rodriguez was one of the participants to Movie Director Spike Lee's documentary When The Levees Broke: A Requiem In Four Acts.

== Election history ==
Police Juror, Ward K, 1987

Threshold > 50%

First Ballot, October 24, 1987

Candidate	Affiliation	Support	Outcome
Junior Rodriguez	Democratic	1,169 (41%)	Runoff
Melvin Guerra	Democratic	762 (27%)	Runoff
Others	n.a.	928 (32%)	Defeated

Second Ballot, November 21, 1987

Candidate	Affiliation	Support	Outcome
Junior Rodriguez	Democratic	1,505 (59%)	Elected
Melvin Guerra	Democratic	1,060 (41%)	Defeated

Councilman, District E, 1991

Threshold > 50%

First Ballot, October 19, 1991

Candidate	Affiliation	Support	Outcome
Junior Rodriguez	Independent	2,655 (50%)	Elected
Melvin Guerra	Democratic	1,038 (20%)	Defeated
Others	n.a.	1,603 (30%)	Defeated

Councilman, District E, 1995

Threshold > 50%

First Ballot, October 21, 1995

Candidate	Affiliation	Support	Outcome
Junior Rodriguez	Independent	1,898 (41%)	Runoff
Douglas Dean	Republican	1,474 (32%)	Runoff
Others	n.a.	1,261 (27%)	Defeated

Second Ballot, November 18, 1995

Candidate	Affiliation	Support	Outcome
Junior Rodriguez	Independent	2,625 (54%)	Elected
Douglas Dean	Republican	2,280 (46%)	Defeated

Councilman at Large, Eastern Division, 1999

Threshold > 50%

First Ballot, October 23, 1999

Candidate	Affiliation	Support	Outcome
Craig Taffaro, Jr.	Republican	7,926 (37%)	Runoff
Junior Rodriguez	Independent	7,705 (36%)	Runoff
Roddy Rodriguez, Jr.	Democratic	5,682 (27%)	Defeated

Second Ballot, November 20, 1999

Candidate	Affiliation	Support	Outcome
Junior Rodriguez	Independent	10,358 (51%)	Elected
Craig Taffaro, Jr.	Republican	9,801 (49%)	Defeated

St. Bernard Parish President, 2003

Threshold > 50%

First Ballot, October 4, 2003

Candidate	Affiliation	Support	Outcome
Junior Rodriguez	Independent	8,701 (34%)	Runoff
Scott Wolfe	Republican	8,650 (34%)	Runoff
Clay Cossé	Republican	6,488 (25%)	Defeated
Kent Diaz	Independent	1,689 (7%)	Defeated

Second Ballot, November 15, 2003

Candidate	Affiliation	Support	Outcome
Junior Rodriguez	Independent	13,916 (56%)	Elected
Scott Wolfe	Republican	10,851 (44%)	Defeated

St. Bernard Parish President, 2007

Threshold > 50%

First Ballot, October 20, 2007

Candidate	Affiliation	Support	Outcome
Craig Taffaro, Jr.	Republican	5,710 (50%)	Runoff
Junior Rodriguez	Independent	3,294 (29%)	Runoff
Donald Serpas	Independent	1,158 (10%)	Defeated
Henry Joseph Rodriguez, III	Independent	711 (6%)	Defeated
William "Bill" Villavaso	Independent	610 (5%)	Defeated

Second Ballot, November 17, 2007

Candidate	Affiliation	Support	Outcome
Craig Taffaro, Jr.	Republican	6,545 (59%)	Elected
Junior Rodriguez	Independent	4,518 (41%)	Defeated

== Sources ==
- New Orleans Magazine : http://www.neworleansmagazine.com/
- Louisiana Secretary of State : http://www.sos.louisiana.gov/
- St. Bernard Parish: http://www.sbpg.net

Political offices
Preceded by John Metzler, Jr. (D)	Councilman, District E 1992–2000	Succeeded by Ricky Melerine (D)
Preceded by Danny Dysart (D)	Councilman at Large, Eastern Division; 2000–2004	Succeeded by Lynn Dean (R)
Preceded by Charles Ponstein (D)	St. Bernard Parish President; 2004–2008	Succeeded by Craig Taffaro, Jr. (R)
