= Kerner House =

- U.S. National Register of Historic Places
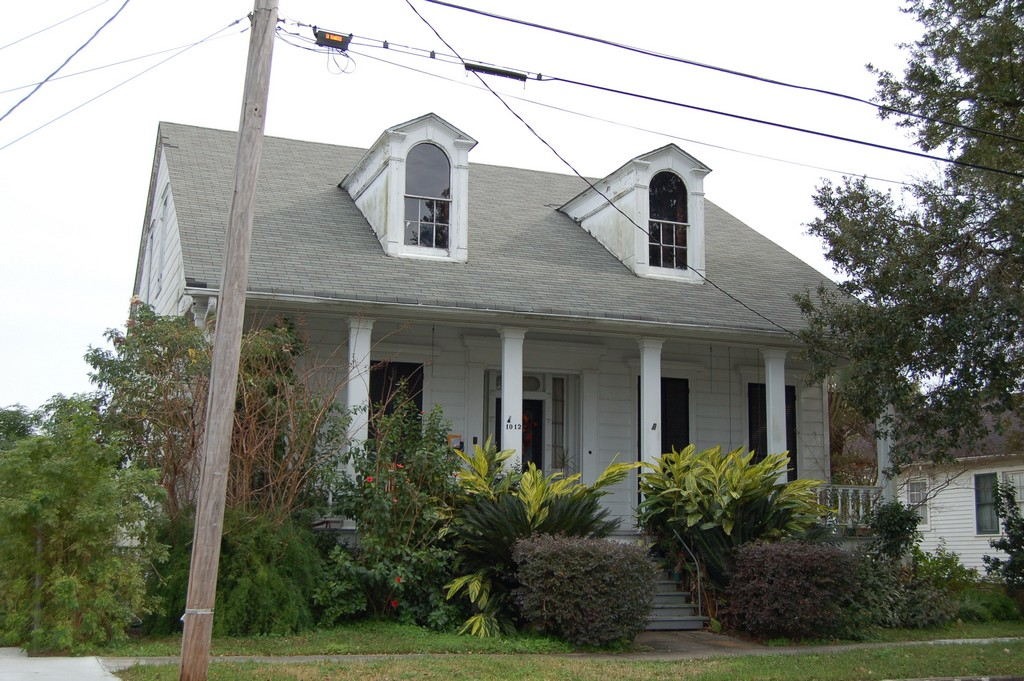

- Location within Louisiana Location within the United States
- Location: 1012 Monroe Street, Gretna, Louisiana
- Coordinates: 29°55′44″N 90°03′03″W
- Area: 0.25 acres (0.10 ha)
- Built: c.1870
- Architectural style: Greek Revival, Italianate
- NRHP reference No.: 00000008
- Added to NRHP: January 28, 2000

Kerner House is a historic house located at 1012 Monroe Street in Gretna, Louisiana, United States. The house was built sometime in the 1870s by the Kerner family. the house is a one-story frame raised cottage in Greek Revival/Italianate style. The house is currently privately owned and is in a state of disrepair and is heavily damaged by plant growth and termites.

The house was listed on the National Register of Historic Places on January 28, 2000.

== See also ==
- National Register of Historic Places listings in Jefferson Parish, Louisiana
- Timothy P. Kerner Sr., descendant of the original owner
