= L.J. Bernard Hardware Store =

- Bernard, L.J. Hardware Store
- U.S. National Register of Historic Places
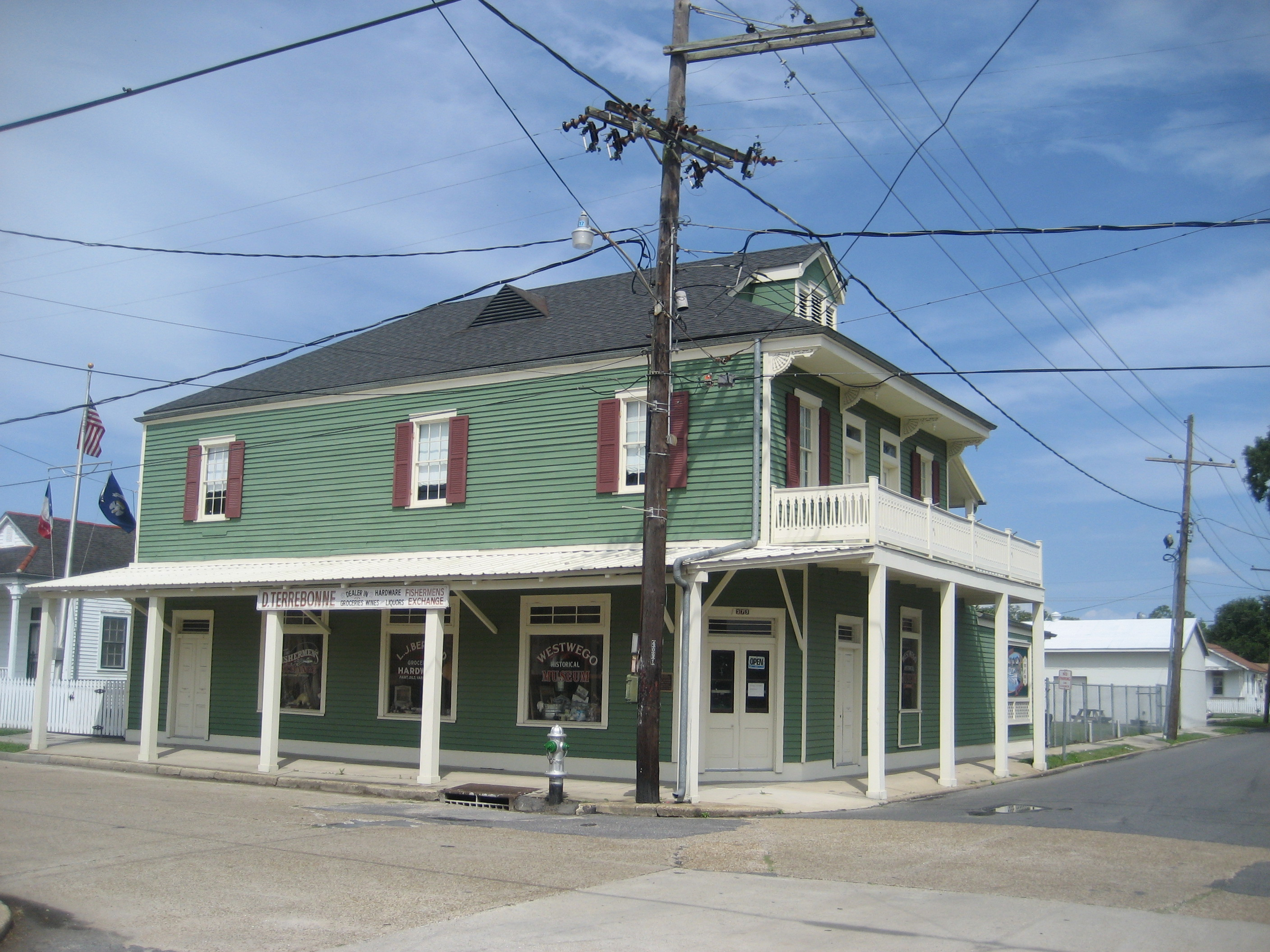
- The building in 2009

- Location within Louisiana
- Location: 275 Sala Avenue, Westwego, Louisiana
- Coordinates: 29°54′49″N 90°08′36″W
- Area: less than one acre
- Built: 1907
- Website: www.visitwestwego.com/westwego-historical-museumm
- NRHP reference No.: 00001144
- Added to NRHP: September 22, 2000

The L.J. Bernard Hardware Store is a historic building in Westwego, Louisiana. It was built in 1907, and remodelled as a hardware store by L. J. Bernard a decade later. It remained in the Bernard family until 1997, and it became the Westwego Historical Museum in 1999. It has been listed on the National Register of Historic Places since September 22, 2000.
