= St. Joseph Church-Convent of the Most Holy Sacrament Complex =

Historic church in Louisiana, United States

- U.S. National Register of Historic Places
- U.S. Historic district – Contributing property
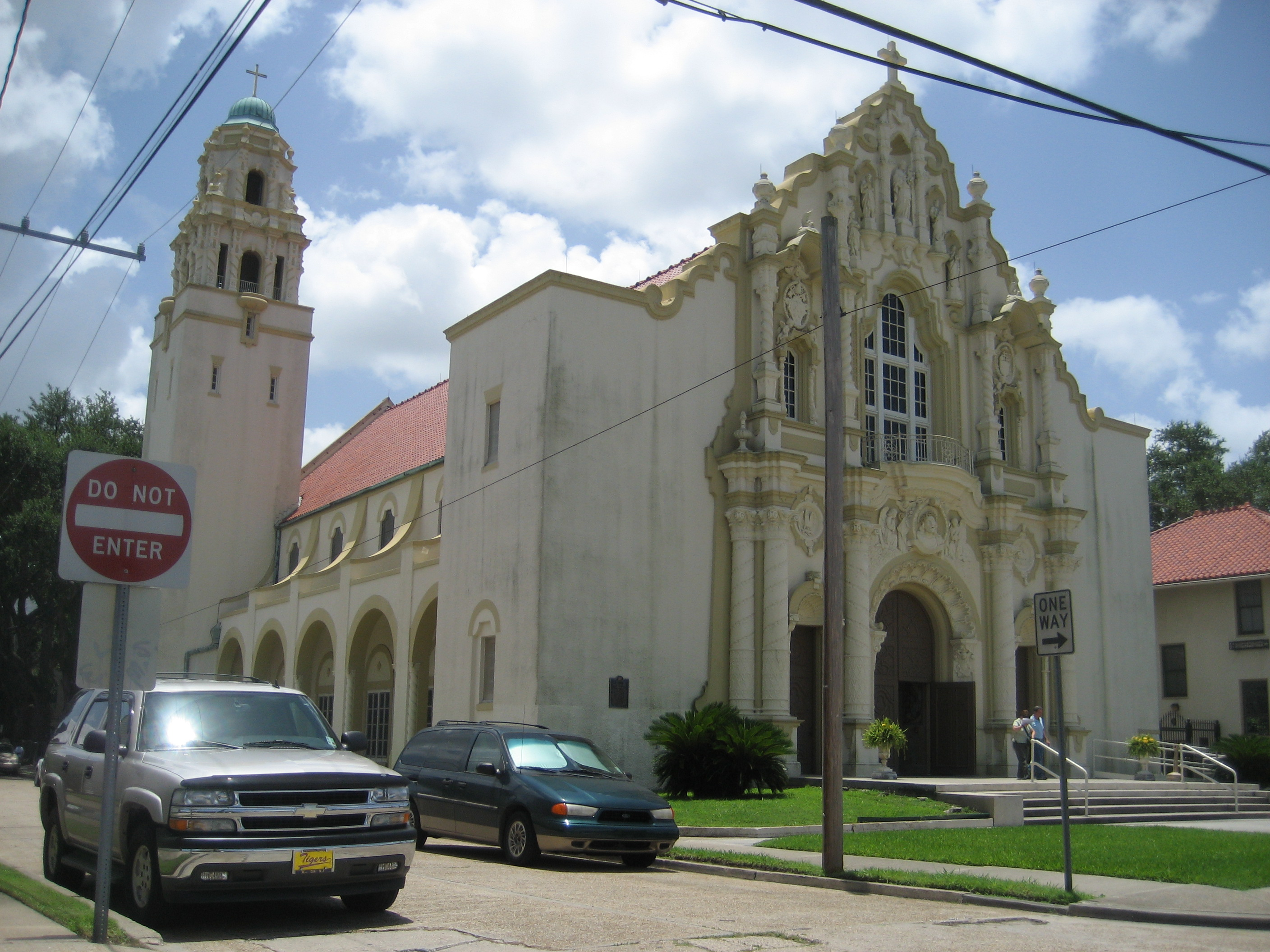

- Location within Louisiana Location within the United States
- Location: Corner of Lavoisier Street and 7th Street, Gretna, Louisiana
- Coordinates: 29°54′52″N 90°03′40″W
- Area: 2 acres (0.81 ha)
- Built: 1899, 1907, 1926
- Built by: William Richard Burk; James McNally
- Part of: Gretna Historic District (ID85000954)
- NRHP reference No.: 83000513

Significant dates
- Added to NRHP: April 15, 1983
- Designated CP: May 2, 1985

The St. Joseph Church-Convent of the Most Holy Sacrament Complex is a historic church complex located at the corner of Lavoisier Street and 7th Street in Gretna, Louisiana.

The 2 acres (0.81 ha) area includes:

- The St. Joseph Church, built in 1926 in Colonial Revival style with Spanish Baroque details.
- A convent and boarding school built in 1899. The three-story brick structure was enlarged, with the addition of a wing containing the chapel, in 1907.
- A two-story stuccoed masonry school building built c.1940, considered a non contributing resource.
- A landscaped yard with an ornamental terra cotta fountain at its center.

The complex was added to the National Register of Historic Places on April 15, 1983. It was also included in Gretna Historic District at the time of its creation on May 2, 1985.

== See also ==
- National Register of Historic Places listings in Jefferson Parish, Louisiana
- Gretna Historic District
