= Felix-Block Building =

- U.S. National Register of Historic Places
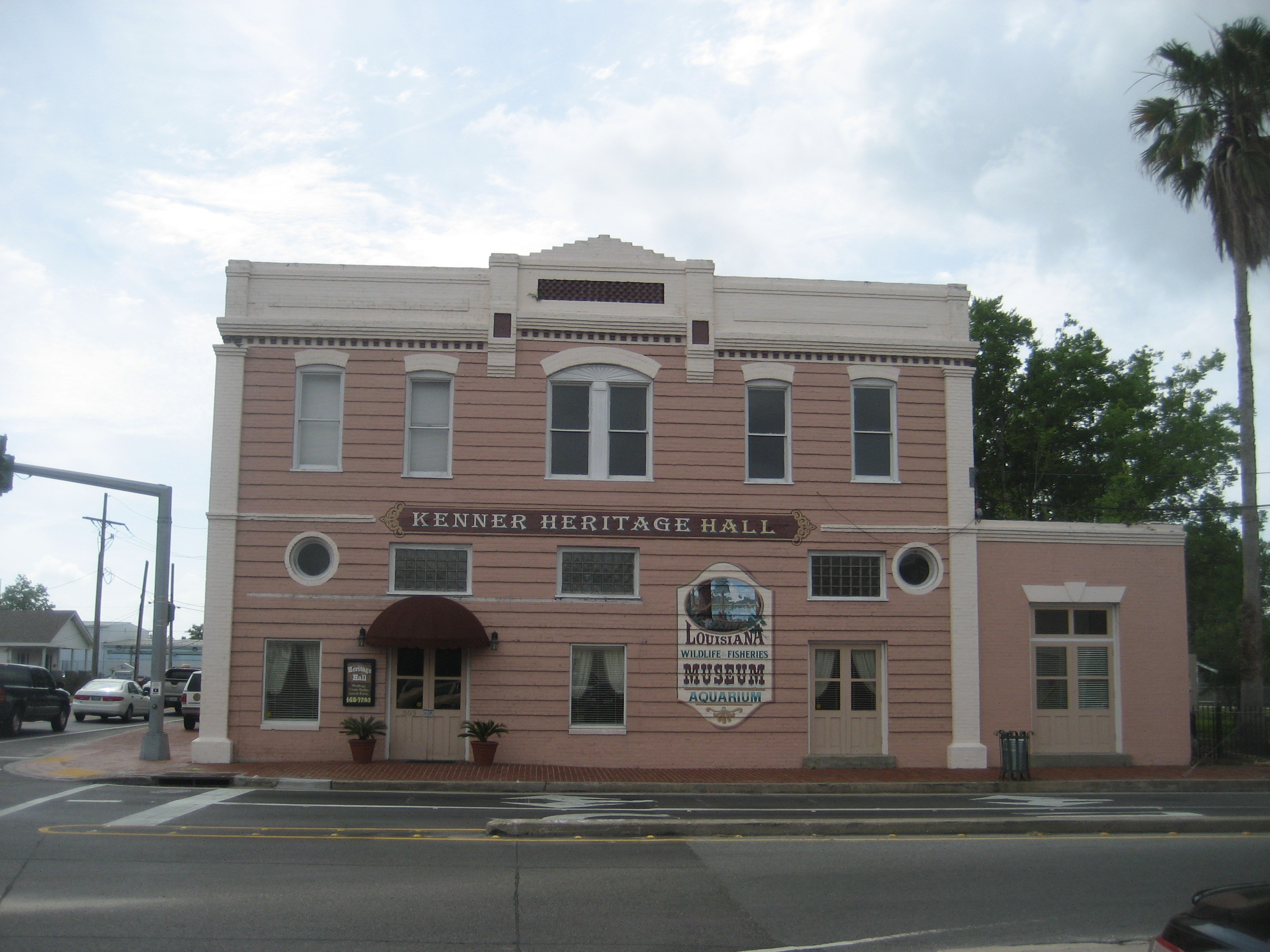
- The building in 2010

- Location within Louisiana
- Location: 303 Williams Boulevard, Kenner, Louisiana
- Coordinates: 29°58′25″N 90°14′49″W
- Area: 0.3 acres (0.12 ha)
- Built: 1907
- Architectural style: Italianate
- NRHP reference No.: 85001587
- Added to NRHP: July 18, 1985

The Felix-Block Building is a historic two-story building in Kenner, Louisiana. It was designed in the Italianate style, and built in 1907. It has been listed on the National Register of Historic Places since July 18, 1985.
