= Benny Rousselle =

American politician (born 1951)

Benedict G. "Benny" Rousselle

Louisiana House of Representatives District 105 (Jefferson, Lafourche, and Plaquemines parishes)
- In office 1996–1999
- Preceded by: Frank Patti
- Succeeded by: Ernest Wooton

President of Plaquemines Parish, Louisiana
- In office 1999 – January 2, 2007
- Preceded by: Clyde Giordano
- Succeeded by: Billy Nungesser

Member of the Plaquemines Parish Council
- In office 1987–1994

Personal details
- Born: January 20, 1951 (age 75) New Orleans, LA
- Party: Independent
- Education: Belle Chasse High School; University of New Orleans
- Occupation: Realtor, Politician

Benedict G. Rousselle, known as Benny Rousselle (born January 20, 1951), is a Realtor and an Independent politician from Plaquemines Parish in Greater New Orleans, Louisiana.

Plaquemines Parish is adjacent to the Algiers district (also known as Fifteenth Ward) of New Orleans. Hurricane Katrina struck Plaquemines Parish during Rousselle's second term as parish president. Katrina and related levee failures resulted in almost all homes and businesses of Plaquemines Parish being catastrophically flooded. Belle Chasse, the location of the Naval Air Station and the Joint Reserve Base, was spared from flood destruction as it is flanked by the Mississippi River on the northern and eastern sides and the Industrial Canal on the west side and naturally sits on high ground. Most had to evacuate permanently from their houses, and many remained for months in Federal Emergency Management Agency trailers.

Rousselle blamed the national administration for the way it handled the aftermath of Katrina. Other politicians who criticized the way the U.S. government handled the aftermath of Hurricane Katrina were Mayor Ray Nagin of New Orleans and parish presidents Junior Rodriguez from St. Bernard and Aaron Broussard from Jefferson.

Rousselle was constitutionally ineligible for a third consecutive term as Plaquemines parish president.

== Election history ==
Member of Parish Council, District 2, 1990

Threshold > 50%

First Ballot, October 6, 1990

Candidate	Affiliation	Support	Outcome
Benny Rousselle	Democratic	709 (65%)	Elected
Richie DiFebbo	Republican	158 (15%)	Defeated
Others	n.a.	221 (20%)	Defeated

State Representative, 105th Representative District, 1995

Threshold > 50%

First Ballot, October 21, 1995

Candidate	Affiliation	Support	Outcome
Benny Rousselle	Democratic	2,985 (31%)	Runoff
Jerry Hodnett	Democratic	2,551 (26%)	Runoff
Others	n.a.	4,118 (43%)	Defeated

Second Ballot, November 18, 1995

Candidate	Affiliation	Support	Outcome
Benny Rousselle	Democratic	5,111 (53%)	Elected
Jerry Hodnett	Democratic	4,565 (47%)	Defeated

Plaquemines Parish President, 1998

Threshold > 50%

First Ballot, October 3, 1998

Candidate	Affiliation	Support	Outcome
Benny Rousselle	Democratic	4,965 (61%)	Elected
Clyde Giordano	Democratic	3,140 (39%)	Defeated

Plaquemines Parish President, 2002

Threshold > 50%

First Ballot, October 5, 2002

Candidate	Affiliation	Support	Outcome
Benny Rousselle	Democratic	3,354 (39%)	Runoff
Clyde Giordano	Democratic	2,518 (29%)	Runoff
Janice Acosta	Democratic	2,163 (25%)	Defeated
Tyronne Edwards	Independent	610 (7%)	Defeated

Second Ballot, November 5, 2002

Candidate	Affiliation	Support	Outcome
Benny Rousselle	Democratic	5,430 (56%)	Elected
Clyde Giordano	Democratic	4,310 (44%)	Defeated

== Sources ==
ThinkExist.com :

Louisiana Secretary of State : https://web.archive.org/web/20060911211304/http://www.sos.louisiana.gov/

Plaquemines Parish: http://www.plaqueminesparish.com/

Preceded by Frank Patti	Louisiana State Representative from District 105; 1996–1999	Succeeded by Ernest Wooton
Preceded by Clyde Giordano	Plaquemines Parish President; 1999–2007	Succeeded by Billy Nungesser
