= Raziano House =

Historic house in Louisiana, US

- U.S. National Register of Historic Places
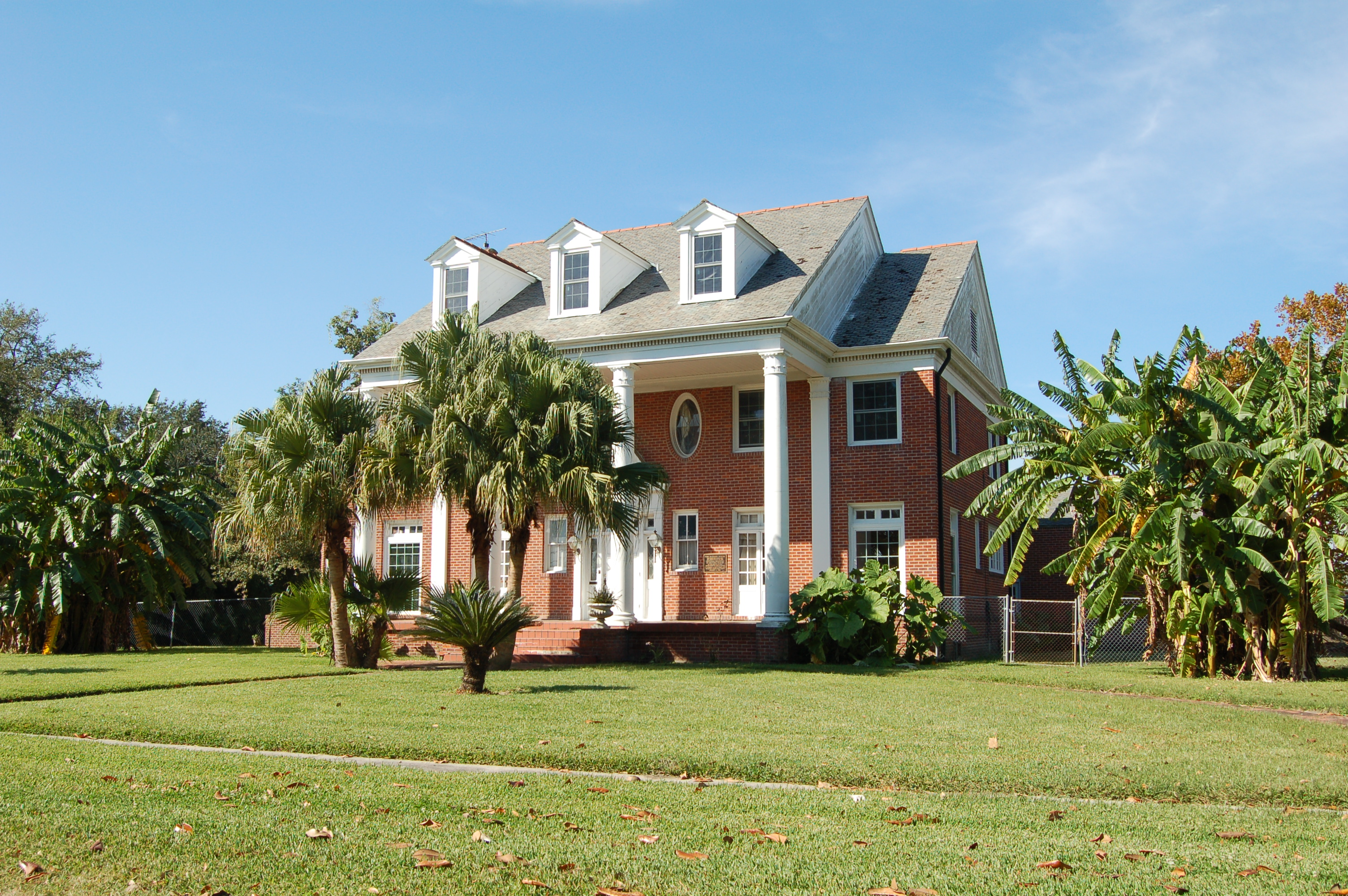

- Location within Louisiana Location within the United States
- Location: 913 Minor Street, Kenner, Louisiana
- Coordinates: 29°58′54″N 90°14′45″W
- Area: 0.6 acres (0.24 ha)
- Built: 1946
- Built by: Preston LeDoux
- Architectural style: Colonial Revival
- NRHP reference No.: 98001058
- Added to NRHP: August 14, 1998

The Raziano House, also known as Mahogany Manor, is a historic house located at 913 Minor Street in Kenner, Louisiana.

Built in 1946 for Henry Raziano and his wife Amelia, the house is a two-story brick residence in the Colonial Revival style.

The house was listed on the National Register of Historic Places on August 14, 1998.

== See also ==
- National Register of Historic Places listings in Jefferson Parish, Louisiana
