= Edmond J. Muniz =

American mayor (1940–2023)

20th Mayor of Kenner, Louisiana
- In office July 2006 – 2010
- Preceded by: Phil Capitano
- Succeeded by: Mike Yenni

Personal details
- Born: February 10, 1940 Kenner, Louisiana, U.S.
- Died: May 20, 2023 (aged 83)
- Party: Republican
- Spouse: Peggy Nette
- Profession: Broadcasting

Edmond J. Muniz (February 10, 1940 – May 20, 2023) was an American politician who served as mayor of Kenner, Louisiana. He was first elected in July 2006 to succeed former mayor, Phil Capitano. He was also the founder and Captain of the Krewe of Endymion, which annually hosts the largest parade and party of the New Orleans Mardi Gras season.

== Political career ==
Edmond J. Muniz was serving his first term as mayor of the city of Kenner, Louisiana — a municipality of 75,000 in the northwest corner of Jefferson Parish. Having served on the Jefferson Parish Council from 1987 through 2003, he came out of political retirement to run for mayor and posted a decisive win in the April 29, 2006, runoff election. While a parish councilman, he was re-elected twice without opposition and two other times with large vote margins.

Muniz was described as a supporter of open government and conducting the public's business in public. Muniz was a fiscal conservative who supported privatization of government services where quality service can be maintained at a cost saving. He supported strict adherence to zoning laws, the preservation of residential neighborhoods, a cleaner environment and protection of Lake Pontchartrain, the economic well-being of local businesses.

Prior to joining the Jefferson Parish Council, Muniz served as an at-large councilman on the Kenner City Council.

Muniz joined the Kenner Council in 1980, when he was elected to fill an unexpired term created when his predecessor vacated the post to become Mayor of Kenner. In 1982, Muniz was reelected unopposed to a full four-year term as councilman at-large and was reelected by a landslide to the post in 1986. During his tenure on the Kenner Council, Muniz served as its president, having been elected to that post by his colleagues. He also served on the council's budget and traffic committees.

Although Muniz began his political career as a Democrat, he became a Republican in October 1984, because he felt the national party more closely represented his political ideals and better addressed the needs of the nation. Shortly after changing parties, Muniz was among a group of local officials invited to the White House to be personally congratulated by President Ronald Reagan.

After becoming a Republican, Muniz received the "Outstanding Service" award five different times from the True Democratic Organization of Jefferson Parish. In 1988, Muniz received the Past President's Award from the Alliance for Good Government, and organization of citizens from throughout Metropolitan New Orleans which monitors the activities of local and state governments. In September 1991, the Alliance gave its prestigious award for "Good Government" to Muniz for successfully sponsoring laws making parish government more open and requiring public disclosure of campaign contributions. In 1999, 2001 and 2003, Muniz was named "Best Jefferson Councilman" by Gambit Weekly newspaper.

== New Orleans Mardi Gras ==
In 1966 Muniz founded and organized the Krewe of Endymion, a parade organization of more than 3,100 maskers that has become the largest in the New Orleans Mardi Gras and judged "Best" parade of the city's Carnival seasons nearly every year since 1994.

Traditionally, the highest-ranking official in a New Orleans Carnival organization is the captain. Muniz was captain and chairman of the board of Endymion from its inception until his death.

Endymion's post-parade party, an entertainment extravaganza comparable to anything Las Vegas can offer, is so large that it is staged in the Louisiana Superdome, site of the 1988 GOP National Convention and eight Super Bowls. In 2006 the event was staged in the New Orleans Convention Center because the Superdome was damaged by Hurricane Katrina.

== Professional and civic activities ==
Muniz began his career in broadcasting in 1959 and, during subsequent years, was associated with half a dozen New Orleans commercial radio stations in all phases of their operation.

Muniz was president of Phase II Broadcasting Inc., which owned commercial radio stations in six Southern states. In 1999, he sold his radio broadcast group to a national radio chain. He was a member of the New Orleans Association of Broadcasters, former media co-chairman for the United-Way of Greater New Orleans and has served on the board of educational station and PBS affiliate WLAE-TV 32. In July 1996, Muniz was inducted into the New Orleans Broadcasters Hall of Fame.

Other memberships have included the Chateau Estates Civic Association, the United Way and St. Elizabeth Seton Catholic Church. He also was a member of the New Orleans Police and Fire Tragedy Fund Inc. and the East Jefferson Business Association. New Orleans Magazine has listed Muniz as one of Greater New Orleans "Most Influential Persons." The New Orleans Men of Fashion named him as one of the 10 Best Dressed Businessmen/Civic Leaders in Greater New Orleans. He was honored as an Outstanding Alumnus of St. Rose of Lima School in New Orleans for his leadership in civic and religious affairs and his dedication to the ideals of Catholic Education.

During the summer of 2006, Muniz was named by City Business newspaper as one of Greater New Orleans business leaders "To Watch." In February, 2001, Muniz was selected "Kingfish of the Month" by New Orleans' Kingfish Magazine for his community leadership in business and government. He was selected "Irish" Grand Marshal of the Irish-Italian Parade of Jefferson in 1997, and he served as Grand Marshal of the St. Patrick's Irish Parade in Metairie in 2002. Muniz also served as Grand Marshal of the 1995 Krewe of Argus Parade in Metairie.

== Personal life and death ==
Muniz was a graduate of St. Rose of Lima Elementary School and St. Aloysius High School. He attended Loyola University. He served in the Louisiana Air National Guard.

Muniz was married to the former Peggy Nette. They had three daughters and four grandchildren. He died on May 20, 2023, at the age of 83.

== See also ==
- List of mayors of Kenner, Louisiana
