= River Ranch, Louisiana =

Neighborhood in Lafayette, United States

Coordinates: 30.173°N 92.042°W

Village of River Ranch

River Ranch is a neighborhood within the city of Lafayette in Lafayette Parish, Louisiana, United States. It lies to the south of the Vermilion River near the intersection of Kaliste Saloom Road and Camellia Boulevard. It is home to over 2,553 people.

River Ranch is home to many commercial and independently owned businesses including dozens of retail shops, health professionals, restaurants and bars.

Dwellings include a mix of owned homes, rental homes, attached townhomes and numerous residential apartment buildings with businesses on the first floor, located within the planned community of River Ranch.

The aesthetic influences found at River Ranch can be traced through the history and heritage of Louisiana. These seven major architectural influences are Caribbean, French, American Colonial, Creole, Acadian, Spanish and Neoclassical Revival.

== Notable person ==
- Billy Nungesser, Lieutenant Governor of Louisiana since 2015 and former president of Plaquemines Parish
