= List of mayors of Kenner, Louisiana =

The following is a list of mayors of the city of Kenner, Louisiana, United States.

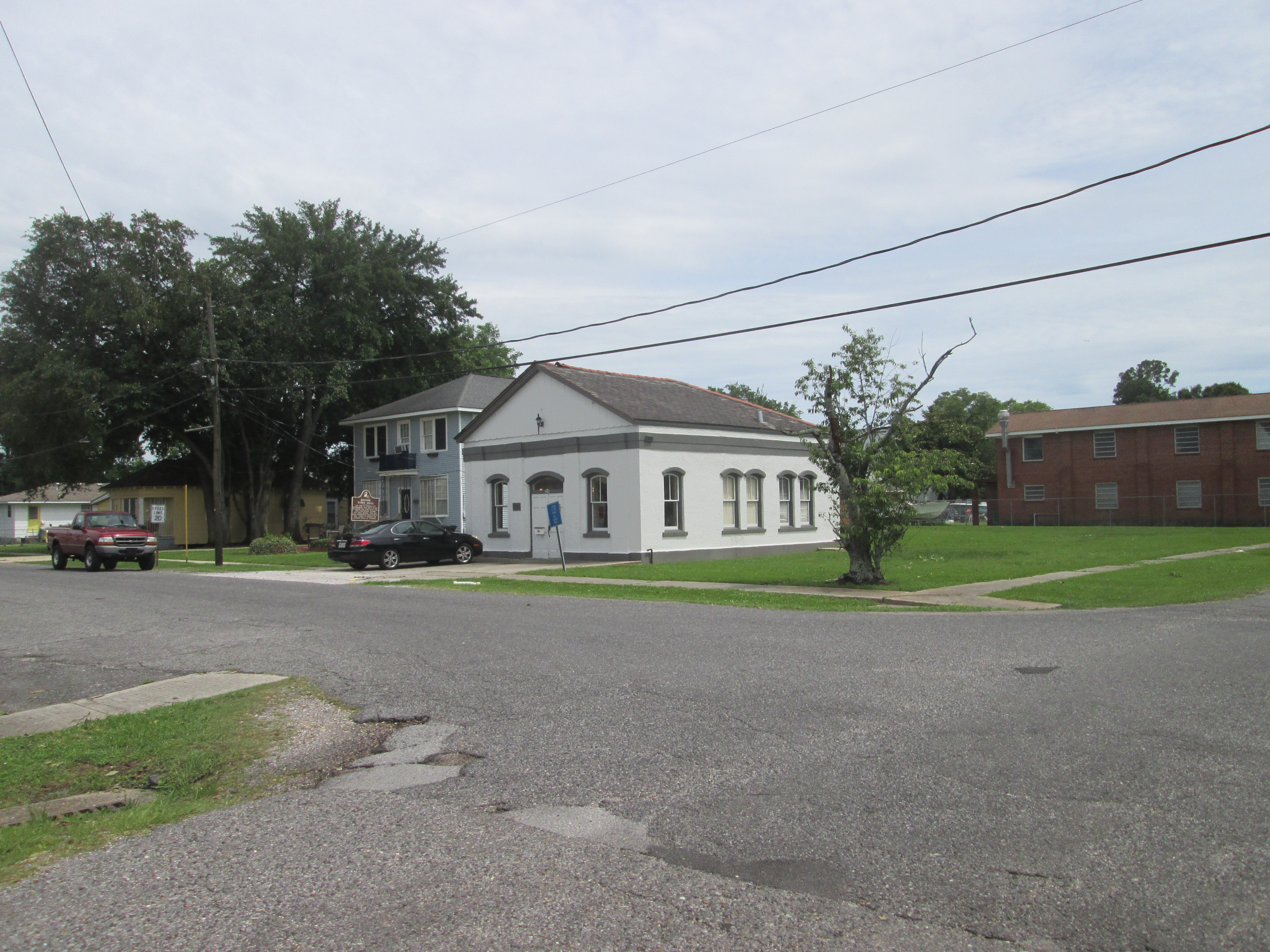
Former town hall building in Kenner, Louisiana; in use 1925-1956 (photo 2015)

- Antoine E. Wattigny, 1913-1916
- Paul Felix, 1916-1920
- George Thompson, 1920-1921
- August Cristina, 1921-1922
- Angelo Maggiore, 1922-1924
- Emile Deshautreaux, 1924-1928
- Anthony Centanni, 1928-1930
- Victor D’Gerolamo, 1930-1942
- Joseph Kopfler, 1942-1957
- Nona A. Kopfler, 1957-1958
- Joseph S. Maggiore, 1958-1962
- Edward J. D’Gerolamo, 1962-1970
- Joseph S. Yenni, 1970-1980
- Larry Hooper, 1980-1982
- Aaron F. Broussard, 1982-1996
- Terry McCarthy, 1996
- Louis J. Congemi, 1996-2003
- Dominic Weilbaecher, 2004
- Phil Capitano, 2004-2006
- Edmond J. Muniz, 2006-2010
- Michael S. Yenni, 2010-2016
- Michael G. Sigur, 2016-2017
- Earl B. "Ben" Zahn, 2017-2022
- Michael J. Glaser, 2022–present

== See also ==
- Kenner Town Hall
- Kenner history
