= Billy Nungesser =

Lieutenant Governor of Louisiana since 2016

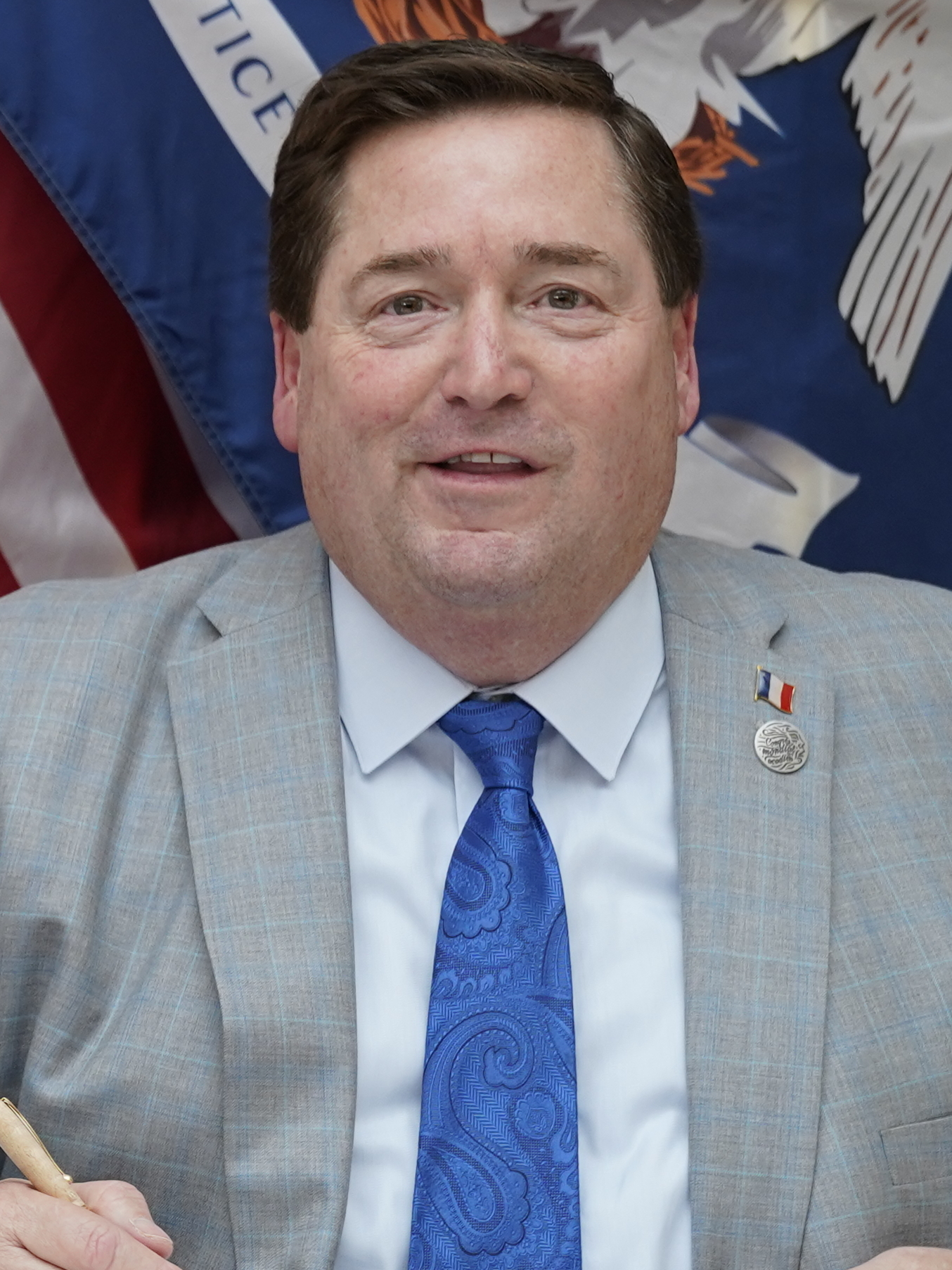
- Nungesser in 2019

54th Lieutenant Governor of Louisiana
- Incumbent
- Assumed office January 11, 2016
- Governor: John Bel Edwards; Jeff Landry
- Preceded by: Jay Dardenne

60th Chair of the National Lieutenant Governors Association
- In office 2019–2020
- Preceded by: Mike Cooney
- Succeeded by: Bethany Hall-Long

President of Plaquemines Parish
- In office January 2, 2007 – January 5, 2015
- Preceded by: Benny Rousselle
- Succeeded by: Amos Cormier

Chair of the Louisiana Republican Party
- In office 1988–1992
- Preceded by: Donald Bollinger
- Succeeded by: Dud Lastrapes

Personal details
- Born: William Harold Nungesser; January 10, 1959 (age 67) New Orleans, Louisiana, U.S.
- Party: Republican
- Spouse: Cher Taffarro

William Harold Nungesser (/ˈnʌnɡɛsər/ NUN-ghess-ər; born January 10, 1959) is an American politician serving as the 54th lieutenant governor of Louisiana since 2016. A member of the Republican Party, Nungesser is also the former president of the Plaquemines Parish Commission, having been re-elected to a second four-year term against two opponents in the 2010 general election with more than 71 percent of the vote. His second term as parish president began on January 1, 2011, and ended four years later.

== Early life ==
Nungesser is the son of William Nungesser and Ruth Amelia Nungesser (née Marks) (1932–2012). From 1980 to 1984, the senior Nungesser was the chief of staff during David C. Treen's term as governor of Louisiana. He was later the state chairman of the Louisiana Republican Party. Ruth Nungesser was also active in Republican politics as a charter member of Republican Women of Louisiana and a delegate to state and national GOP conventions.

== Early career ==
In 1983, Treen appointed Nungesser to the Lake Pontchartrain and Maurepas Study Commission; in 1985 his father was appointed to the Orleans Levee Board.

While working in his family's offshore catering business, Nungesser found an alternative use for metal ship containers. In 1991, he established General Marine Leasing Company, a business which provides portable living quarters for offshore workers. The company grew to employ two hundred people and reach $20 million in sales.

In 2004, Nungesser was the chairman for the Plaquemines Parish United Way. In 2004 and 2005, Nungesser worked with local business leaders to form the Plaquemines Association of Business and Industry or PABI, separate from the statewide Louisiana Association of Business and Industry. He served on the PABI board during its early years.

== Parish President ==
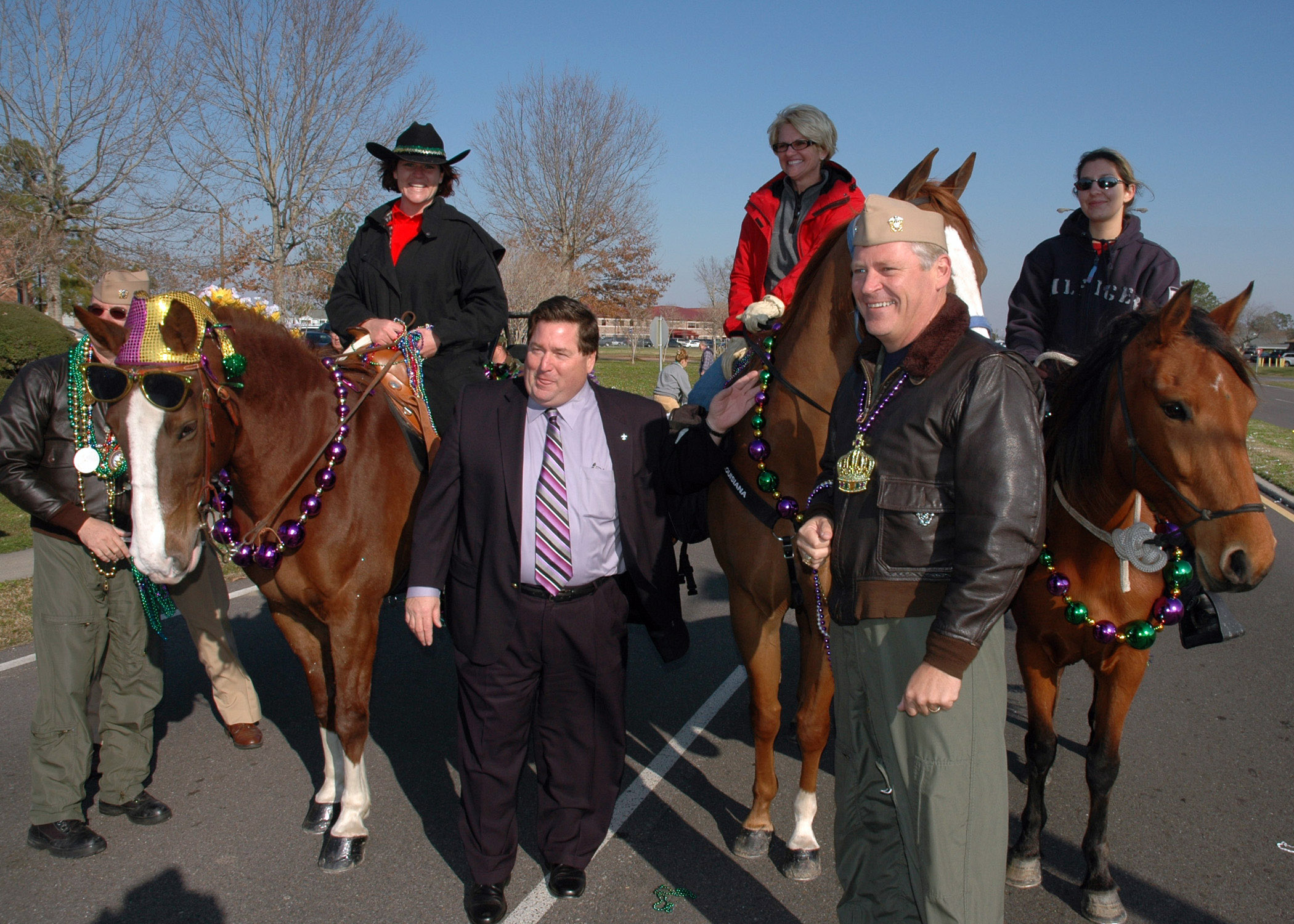
Nungesser (standing center left) at 2007 Plaquedilla Parade

=== First term ===
In 2006, Nungesser ran for the open position of president of the Plaquemines Parish Commission; the population of the parish is about 25,000 people. The incumbent president, Democrat Benny Rousselle, a former state representative, was term-limited. Nungesser defeated then-Democrat Amos Cormier, Jr., with 4,096 votes (51.1 percent) to Cormier's 3,920 votes (48.9 percent).

==== Hurricane Katrina ====
Plaquemines Parish consists of the final stretch of the Mississippi River before it flows into the Gulf of Mexico. In 2005, Hurricane Katrina first made landfall in the southern end of Plaquemines Parish in the town of Empire, and the eye passed over the parish community of Buras-Triumph.

Much of Nungesser's work in his first two years was on hurricane recovery. The Federal Emergency Management Agency (FEMA) originally obligated $400,000 to rebuild the marina at Port Eads after Katrina. Nungesser went to Washington, D.C. to appeal the amount; FEMA then authorized $12 million for the project.

==== 2008 hurricanes ====
Before Hurricane Gustav made landfall in August 2008, Nungesser used a helicopter to count the number of barges that could potentially become a safety issue to people, property, and the levee system during the hurricane. His team called the owners of about 150 barges and told them to move them or the parish would sink them. Seventy did not move, and were sunk, either by the parish or their owners. Less than three weeks later, most of the barges were back up and running.

In September 2008, Hurricane Ike passed hundreds of miles south of Plaquemines, but its tide surge greatly affected the parish. The water began rising against the levees on the east bank of Plaquemines near the Caernarvon freshwater diversion at Braithwaite. The structure allows fresh water from the Mississippi River to flow into the marsh on the east side of the river. Parish officials noticed the water in the river was not rising at the same rate. After consulting the Army Corps of Engineers, a quick decision was made to open the floodgates to permit the rising water flow into the Mississippi, relieving pressure on the levees.

In February 2009, Governor Bobby Jindal appointed Nungesser to the Louisiana Coastal Protection and Restoration Authority, a 20-member panel assigned to develop a master plan on coastal protection for the state.

==== Deepwater Horizon Oil Spill ====
Nungesser was heavily involved in the response to the 2010 Deepwater Horizon oil spill. He made countless media appearances, including almost nightly guest appearances on the CNN alongside journalist Anderson Cooper. Nungesser was recognized as the "face of the oil spill" by major media outlets such as the New Orleans Times-Picayune, The New York Times, Associated Press, CNN, Reuters, and ABC News.

=== Second term ===
In 2010, Nungesser won re-election to parish president, defeating former parish presidents Cormier and Rousselle. Nungesser got 5,632 votes (71 percent) to Cormier's 1,772 (22 percent) and Rousselle's 499 (6 percent).

Nungesser began his second term with a public cry for help in removing oil from eroded land at Bay Jimmy.

Nungesser collaborated with the U.S. Army Corps of Engineers in Vicksburg, Mississippi, to create the Plaquemines Restoration and Protection Plan, released in 2009. The plan proposed multiple lines of defense along with the levee system to protect the parish from future tropical systems. "If Plaquemines Parish is going to get better hurricane protection, then it’s going to need more than levees," Nungesser said.

Nungesser, who was term-limited, was not able to run for re-election in 2014. Cormier, who had switched parties and was now running as a Republican, won a runoff election on December 6, 2014, defeating fellow Republican Jerry Hodnett.

== Lieutenant governor ==
=== 2011 race ===
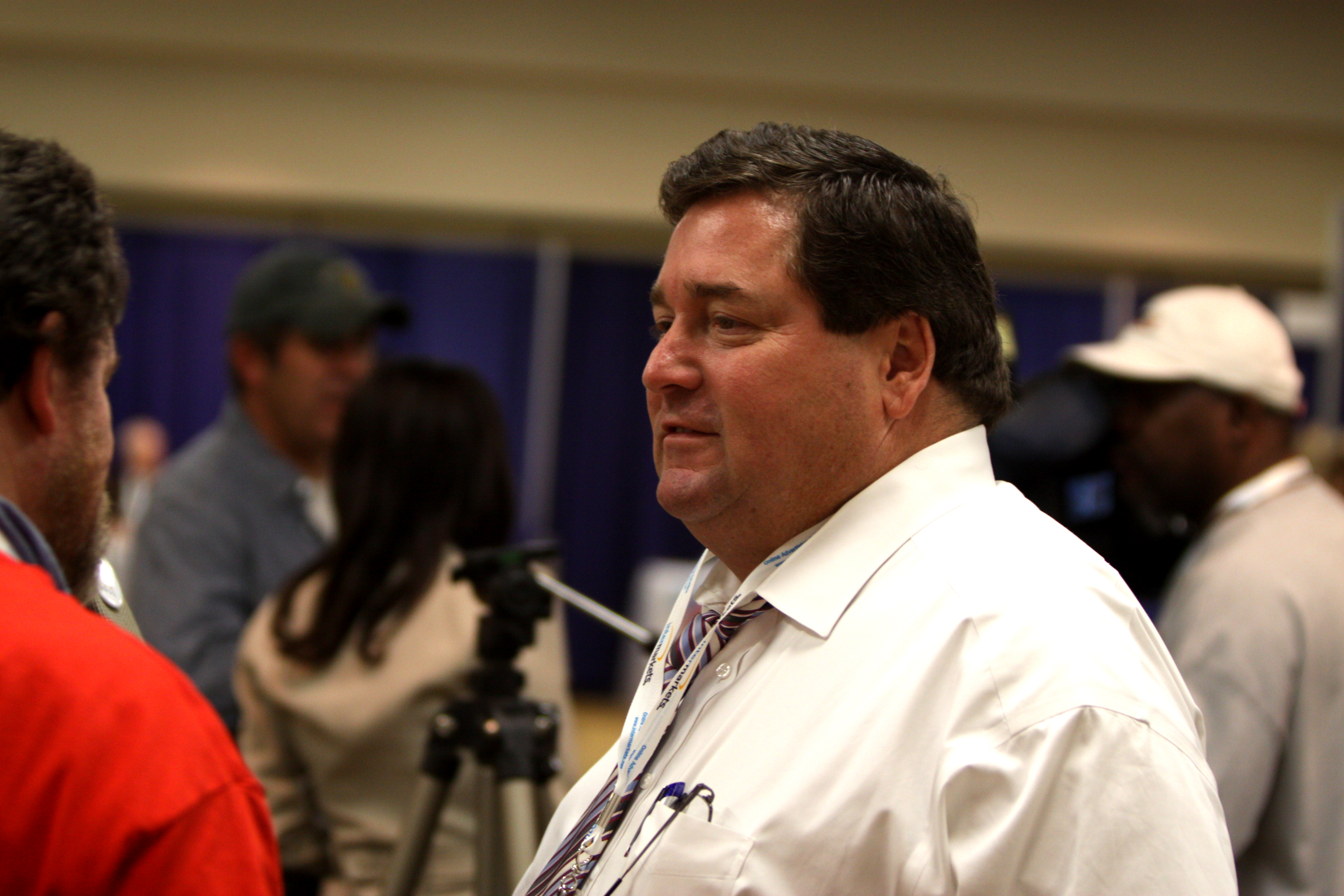
Nungesser in 2011

In 2011, Nungesser waged an unsuccessful race to unseat Lieutenant Governor Jay Dardenne. Dardenne, a fellow Republican, had been a state senator from Baton Rouge and the Louisiana secretary of state; he had been elected in 2010 to the final year of one-year unexpired term created when Lt. Governor Mitch Landrieu was elected the Mayor of New Orleans.

Dardenne received 504,228 votes (53.1 percent) to Nungesser's 444,750 (46.9 percent). Nungesser won in seventeen parishes, all in south Louisiana, including Orleans, Iberia, Jefferson, Lafayette, and St. Bernard, as well as Plaquemines Parish, his former residence.

=== 2015 election ===
Nungesser ran again for lieutenant governor in 2015. Dardenne did not seek reelection but ran instead for governor.

In his campaign, Nungesser said that his business and political experience made him ideal to manage the state tourism industry, the principal function of the Lieutenant Governor's office. His sentimental political advertisements used background music from the song "You Are My Sunshine" by the late Democratic Governor Jimmie Davis.

Nungesser finished second in the primary election with 324,654 votes (30 percent), setting him up for the run-off against Kip Holden, the Democratic Mayor-President of East Baton Rouge Parish, who led the four-candidate field with 360,679 votes (33.3 percent). In a strong third-place was Republican John Young, the president of Jefferson Parish, who received 313,183 votes (28.9 percent). Departing Republican State Senator Elbert Guillory of Opelousas ran last with 85,460 votes (7.9 percent).

Nungesser won the 2015 general election, 628,864 votes (55.38 percent) to Holden's 506,578 (44.62 percent). Democrat John Bel Edwards won the gubernatorial race over Republican U.S. Senator David Vitter. Edwards and Nungesser, of opposite parties, assumed office on January 11, 2016.

=== Tenure ===
Shortly after taking office, Nungesser named Robert J. Barham of Morehouse Parish, the former secretary of the Louisiana Department of Wildlife and Fisheries under former Governor Jindal, as the new director of state parks and historic sites. Nungesser became acquainted with Barham when the two worked closely together in the aftermath of the Deepwater Horizon oil spill of 2010.

In April 2016, Nungesser's communications director, Kriss Fairbairn Fortunato quit her position, saying that "It was not a comfortable environment and not a good fit"; she was returned full-time to her private communications company. Fortunato left Nungesser's office a week before The Baton Rouge Advocate published a story about how Nungesser and state Republican chairman Roger Villere had attempted to negotiate an unusual oil trade deal with Iraq. Nungesser signed letters in the negotiations invoking the name of Governor Edwards but never informed Edwards of the idea which he and Villere were promoting.

In July 2016, Nungesser said that he believes voter fraud by the Democratic Party was still a serious hurdle for Republicans in Louisiana. Nungesser said that in local elections in his native Plaquemines Parish and also in 2015 elections statewide, registered and unregistered voters had shown up by the busload at early voting sites, signed a sheet of paper, and had their votes count. Secretary of State Tom Schedler, a fellow Republican, called Nungesser's comments "at a minimum uninformed. [He] quite possibly [made] an insult to not only my office, but also our hard-working clerks of court and registrars of voters who are our trusted partners for every election." Nungesser said his comments were taken out of context because he was referring to a local election in Plaquemines Parish in 2005. He said that he admired how Schedler handled the office of Secretary of State.

In April 2017, Nungesser was accused of "political interference" in the operation of the Louisiana State Museum in New Orleans. Timothy Joseph "Tim" Chester, the interim director of the Louisiana State Museum in New Orleans, resigned in a public dispute with Nungesser. Chester said that Nungesser had used an apartment at the Lower Pontalba Building in Jackson Square as well as space in other state museum buildings in the French Quarter for Nungesser's personal convenience. He also accused the lieutenant governor of interfering in the operation of the museum. Nungesser said that Chester had not been moving with sufficient speed to find a permanent director or to implement Nungesser's recommendations regarding the museum, which includes historic buildings in both New Orleans and Baton Rouge and was operated by the state Department of Culture, Recreation and Tourism, an agency overseen by the lieutenant governor. The museum, however, also has a semi-independent operating board.

Nungesser opposed the removal of Confederate monuments honoring Jefferson Davis, Robert E. Lee, and Pierre G.T. Beauregard from Lee Circle in New Orleans. With only one dissent, the New Orleans City Council agreed with the request of Mayor Mitch Landrieu to remove the monuments. In a 2017 letter to U.S. President Donald Trump, Nungesser asked that executive power be exerted under the Antiquities Act of 1906, by which the chief executive can "declare by public proclamation, historic and prehistoric structures and other objects of historic significance as national monuments." Trump did not reply.

Nungesser called upon Landrieu to transfer the four monuments to the jurisdiction of the Department of Recreation, Culture, and Tourism, under Nungesser's jurisdiction. Instead, Landrieu planned to place the monuments up for competitive bidding. Nungesser said that he would make an offer for the monuments but needed state legislative approval.

In 2017, Nungesser proposed that public-private partnerships be established for many of the financially strapped state parks under his jurisdiction, particularly citing two popular facilities in Sabine Parish: North Toledo Bend State Park and Hodges Gardens State Park. At the parks, operating costs vastly exceeded revenues from the $1 park admission fees.

In July 2018, Nungesser appeared on a radio program to reject claims by the more conservative members of his party that he has become a "Republican in Name Only" (RINO) because he is "too friendly" with Democratic Governor Edwards. Nungesser said that state officials must work together, and "I think sometimes the political maneuvering gets in the way of what’s best for the state." Nungesser noted that by working with Edwards, he saved a $17 million appropriation for the state park system, preventing closures and layoffs.

=== 2019 and 2023 re–elections ===
Nungesser was re-elected to a second term as lieutenant governor on October 12, 2019 and a third term on October 14, 2023.

== Personal life ==
Nungesser has a younger brother, Eric, and two sisters, Nancy and Heidi.

After his second term as parish president, Nungesser relocated to River Ranch in Lafayette Parish. He then moved to Plaquemines Parish with his wife.

In 2022, his Plaquemines house was burglarized and partially burned, with the robbers making off with political and sports memorabilia. Nungesser stated afterwards that he intended to sell the house and move.

== Electoral history ==
Plaquemines Parish President Election, 2006
| Party | Candidate | Votes | % |
| Republican | Billy Nungesser | 4,096 | 51 |
| Democratic | Amos Cormier, Jr. (inc.) | 3,920 | 49 |

Plaquemines Parish President Election, 2010
| Party | Candidate | Votes | % |
| Republican | Billy Nungesser (inc.) | 5,632 | 71 |
| Democratic | Amos Cormier, Jr. | 1,772 | 22 |
| Independent | Benny Rousselle | 499 | 6 |

Louisiana Lieutenant Governor Election, 2011
| Party | Candidate | Votes | % |
| Republican | Jay Dardenne (inc.) | 504,451 | 53 |
| Republican | Billy Nungesser | 445,049 | 47 |

Louisiana Lieutenant Governor Election, 2015
| Party | Candidate | Votes | % |
| Democratic | Melvin "Kip" Holden | 361,092 | 33 |
| Republican | Billy Nungesser | 324,849 | 30 |
| Republican | John Young | 313,364 | 29 |
| Republican | Elbert Lee Guillory | 85,520 | 8 |

Louisiana Lieutenant Governor Runoff Election, 2015
| Party | Candidate | Votes | % |
| Republican | Billy Nungesser | 628,876 | 55 |
| Democratic | Melvin "Kip" Holden | 506,640 | 45 |

Louisiana Lieutenant Governor Election, 2019
| Party | Candidate | Votes | % |
| Republican | Billy Nungesser | 884,309 | 68 |
| Democratic | Willie Jones | 413,556 | 32 |

Louisiana Lieutenant Governor Election, 2023
| Party | Candidate | Votes | % |
| Republican | Billy Nungesser | 678,531 | 65 |
| Democratic | Willie Jones | 211,988 | 20 |
| Republican | Elbert Guillory | 64,058 | 6 |

Party political offices
| Preceded by Jay Dardenne | Republican nominee for Lieutenant Governor of Louisiana; 2015, 2019, 2023 | Most recent |
Political offices
| Preceded by Benny Rousselle | President of Plaquemines Parish; 2007–2015 | Succeeded by Amos Cormier |
| Preceded by Jay Dardenne | Lieutenant Governor of Louisiana; 2016–present | Incumbent |
