= Magnolia Lane Plantation =

Historic house in Louisiana, United States

- Magnolia Lane Plantation House
- U.S. National Register of Historic Places
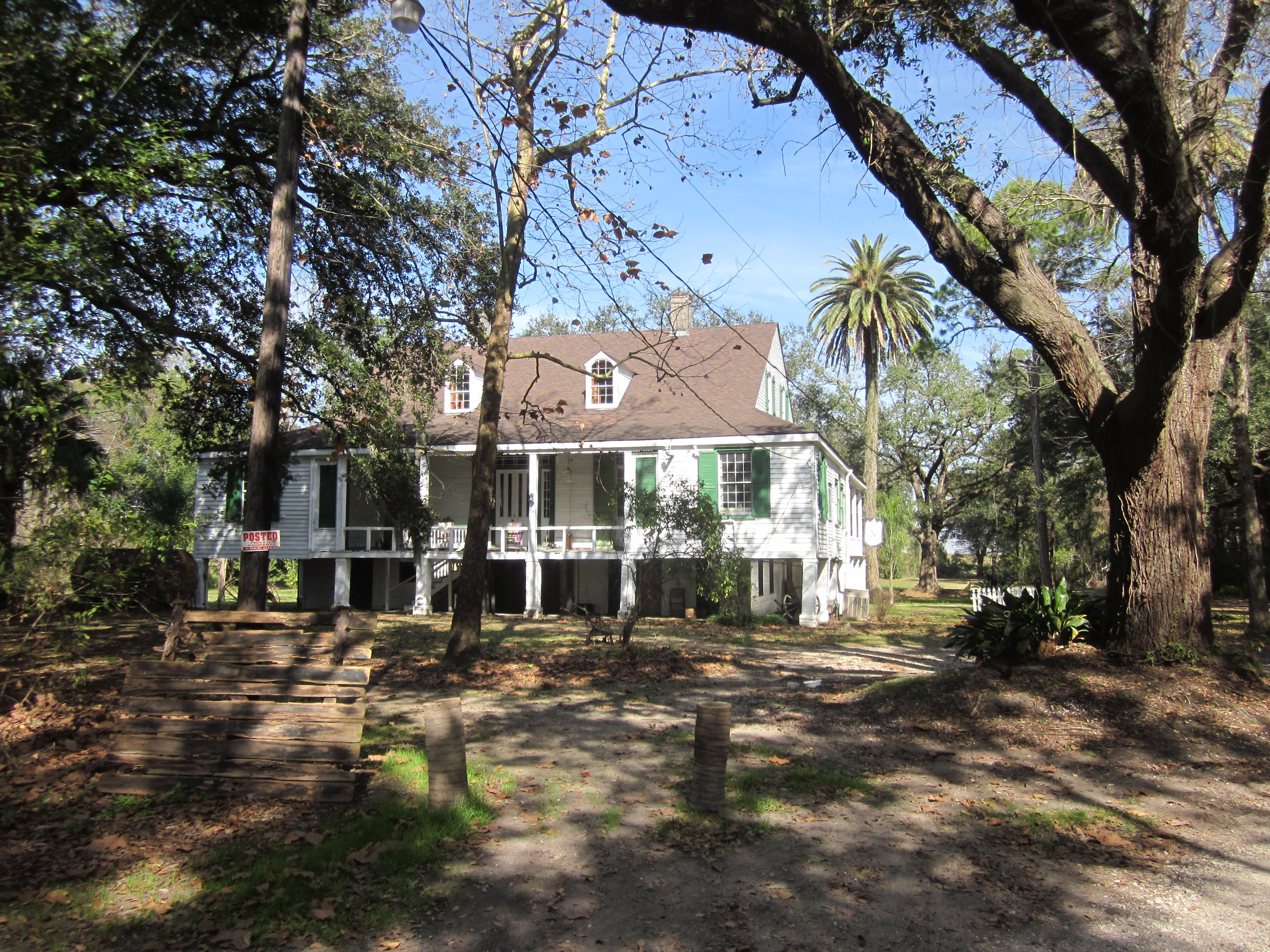

- Location within Louisiana Location within the United States
- Location: Along River Road (LA 541) at Nine Mile Point
- Nearest city: Westwego, Louisiana
- Coordinates: 29°56′59″N 90°09′12″W
- Area: 13.25 acres (5.36 ha)
- Built: c.1830
- Built by: Edward Fortier
- Architectural style: Greek Revival, Federal
- NRHP reference No.: 86000253
- Added to NRHP: February 13, 1986

The Magnolia Lane Plantation, also known as the Fortier Plantation, is a historic plantation located on the Mississippi River in Jefferson Parish, Louisiana along LA 541. The plantation was owned in 1784 by Edward Fortier, during the Spanish colonial period. After being purchased in 1867 the plantation changed its name.

The plantation house and a 13.25 acres (5.36 ha) area comprising several non contributing structures was added to the National Register of Historic Places on February 13, 1986.

The plantation home and property has been used for many major motion picture productions filmed in the New Orleans area.

== See also ==
- List of plantations in Louisiana
- National Register of Historic Places listings in Jefferson Parish, Louisiana
