= David Crockett Fire Hall and Pumper =

- U.S. National Register of Historic Places
- U.S. Historic district – Contributing property
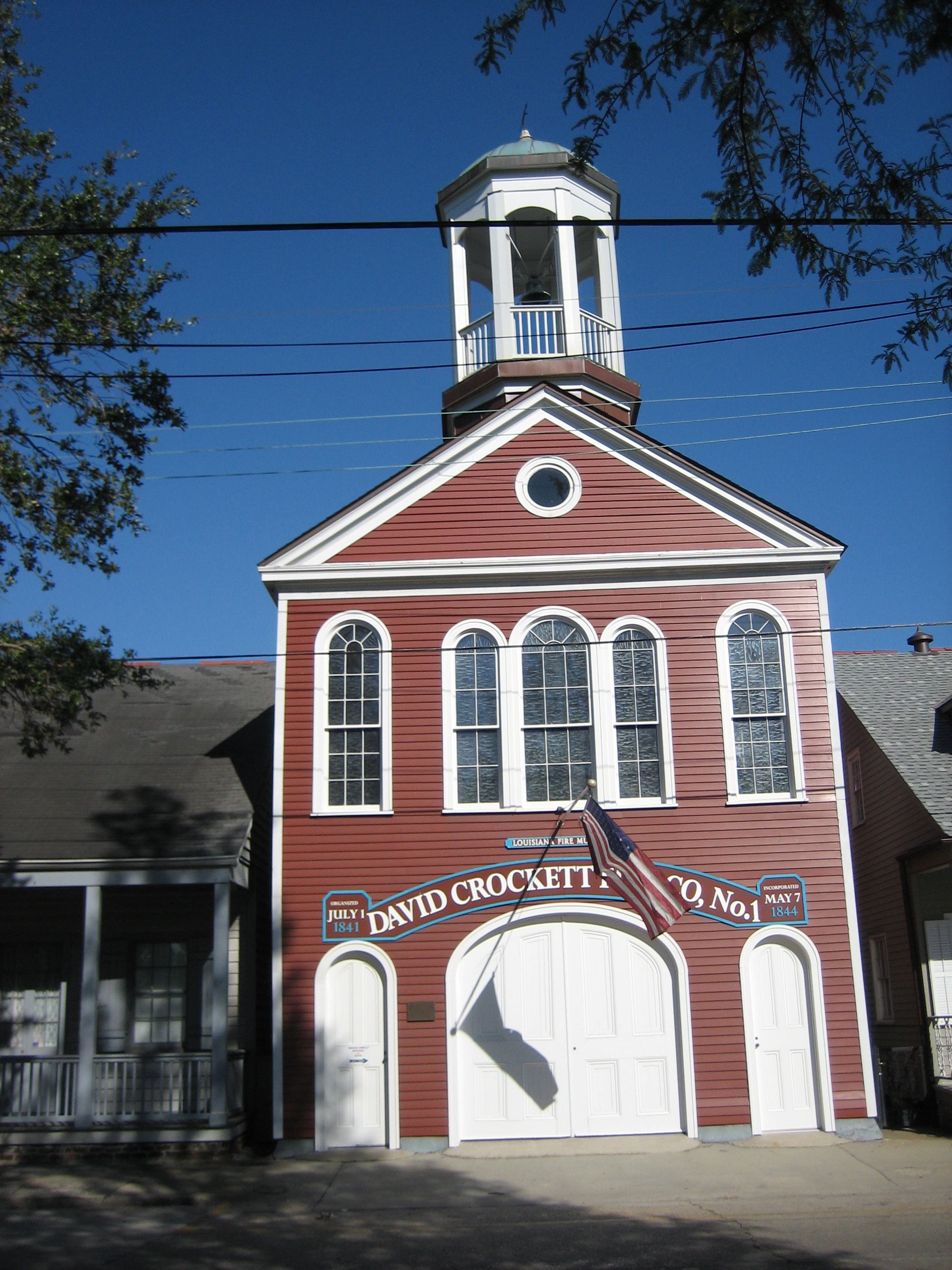

- Location within Louisiana Location within the United States
- Location: 205 Lafayette St., Gretna, Louisiana
- Coordinates: 29°55′08″N 90°03′47″W
- Area: 0.2 acres (0.081 ha)
- Built: 1859
- Manufacturer: R. Gould Co.
- Part of: Gretna Historic District
- NRHP reference No.: 83000510

Significant dates
- Added to NRHP: January 27, 1983
- Designated CP: May 2, 1985

The David Crockett Fire Hall and Pumper, at 205 Lafayette St. in Gretna, Louisiana, was listed on the National Register of Historic Places in 1983. The fire station was built in 1859. It is a two-story wood-frame structure, which was later modified.

The firehouse is part of Gretna Historical Society Museum. It is also a contributing property of the Gretna Historic District.
