= Old Jefferson Parish Courthouse =

- U.S. National Register of Historic Places
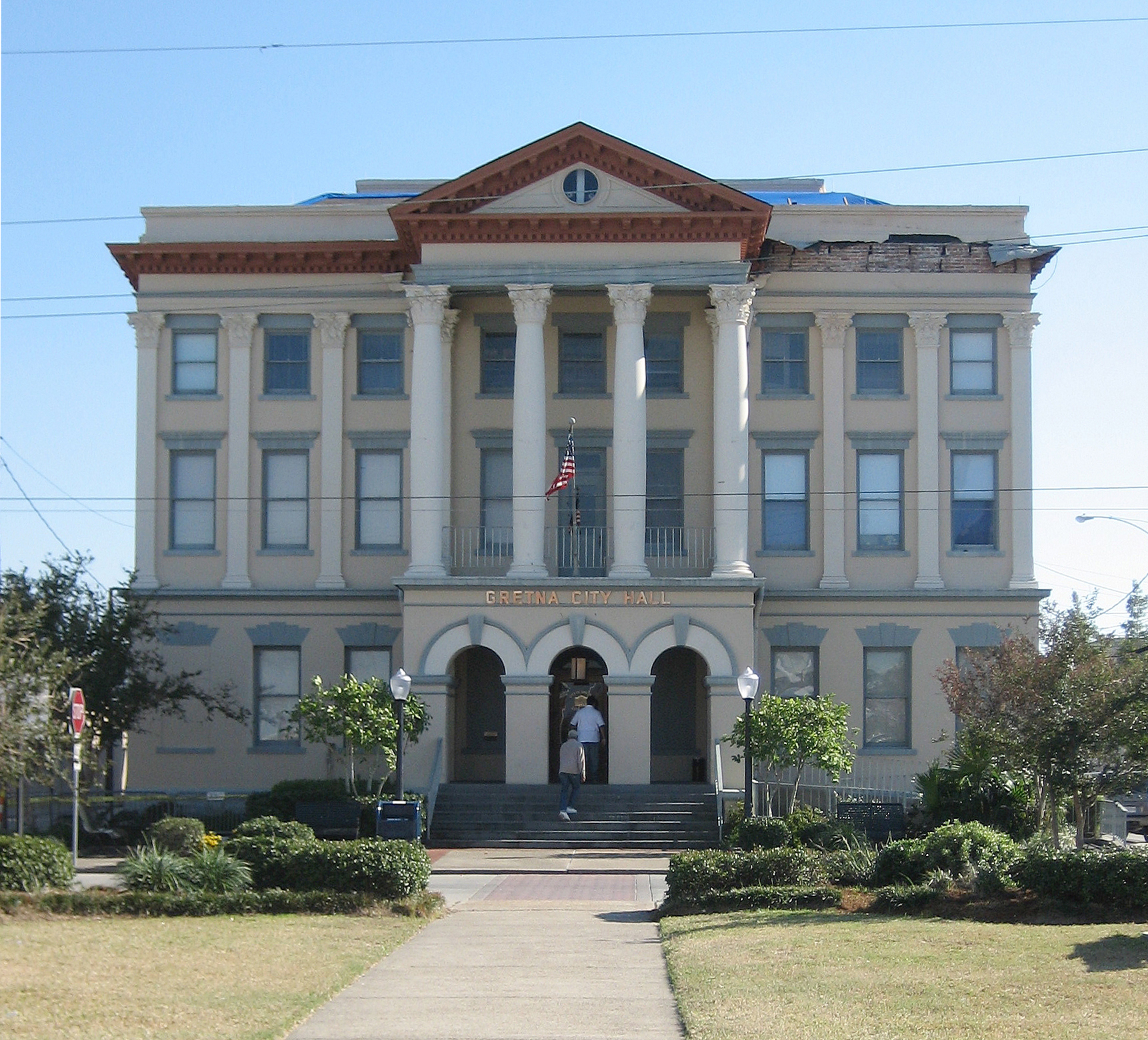
- The building in 2005

- Location within Louisiana
- Interactive map showing the location of Old Jefferson Parish Courthouse
- Location: 200 Huey P. Long Avenue, Gretna, Louisiana
- Coordinates: 29°54′59″N 90°03′55″W
- Area: 0.5 acres (0.20 ha)
- Built: 1907
- Architect: R.S. Soule
- Architectural style: Renaissance
- NRHP reference No.: 83000512
- Added to NRHP: January 21, 1983

The Old Jefferson Parish Courthouse is a historic three-story building in Gretna, Louisiana. It was designed in the Renaissance Revival style by architect R.S. Soule, and built in 1907. It was the parish courthouse until 1956. It is now the Gretna city hall. It has been listed on the National Register of Historic Places since January 21, 1983.
