= Lists of American non-fiction television episodes =

This is a list of lists of American non-fiction television episodes.

== 0–9 ==
- List of 30 for 30 films
- List of 60 Minutes episodes

== A ==
- List of AEW Dynamite special episodes
- List of America ReFramed episodes
- List of America's Test Kitchen episodes
- List of American Chopper episodes
- List of American Chopper: Senior vs. Junior episodes
- List of American Experience episodes
- List of American Greed episodes
- List of American Masters episodes
- List of American Pickers episodes
- List of American Restoration episodes
- List of Animal World episodes
- List of Are You the One? episodes
- List of Auction Hunters episodes
- List of Autopsy: The Last Hours of... episodes

== B ==
- List of Barefoot Contessa episodes
- List of BattleBots episodes
- List of Bethenny Ever After episodes
- List of Brunch at Bobby's episodes

== C ==
- List of Cajun Pawn Stars episodes
- List of Cake Boss episodes
- List of Catfish: The TV Show episodes
- List of Celebrity Family Feud episodes
- List of Celebrity Rehab with Dr. Drew episodes
- List of Chase (2008 TV series) episodes
- List of Chasing Classic Cars episodes
- List of Chelsea episodes
- List of The Chris Gethard Show episodes
- List of City Confidential episodes
- List of Computer Chronicles episodes
- List of Conan episodes
- List of Cook's Country episodes
- List of Counting Cars episodes
- List of Counting On episodes
- List of Couples Therapy episodes
- List of Criss Angel Mindfreak episodes
- List of The Crocodile Hunter episodes
- List of Cupcake Wars episodes
- List of Cutthroat Kitchen episodes

== D ==
- List of The Dead Files episodes
- List of Deadliest Catch episodes
- List of Deadly Women episodes
- List of Destination Truth episodes
- List of Digging for the Truth episodes
- List of Dirty Jobs episodes
- List of Dirty Jobs home video releases
- List of Disappeared episodes
- List of Don't Be Tardy... episodes
- List of Drew Carey's Improv-A-Ganza episodes
- List of Dual Survival episodes
- List of Duck Dynasty episodes

== E ==
- List of Endurance episodes
- List of The Eric Andre Show episodes
- List of Extreme Makeover: Home Edition episodes

== F ==
- List of Face Off episodes
- List of The FBI Files episodes
- List of Finding Bigfoot episodes
- List of Finding Your Roots episodes
- List of Firing Line episodes (1966–1969)
- List of The First 48 episodes
- List of Fixer Upper episodes
- List of Flip or Flop episodes
- List of Forensic Files episodes
- List of Fox News Specials
- List of French in Action episodes
- List of Frontline (American TV program) episodes
- List of Full Frontal with Samantha Bee episodes

== G ==
- List of The Generation Gap episodes
- List of Ghost Adventures episodes
- List of Ghost Hunters episodes
- List of Ghost Hunters International episodes
- List of Good Bones episodes

== H ==
- List of A Haunting episodes
- List of History's Lost & Found episodes
- List of Hoarders episodes
- List of Hot Ones episodes

== I ==
- List of Ice Road Truckers episodes
- List of Impractical Jokers episodes
- List of In Concert episodes
- List of Independent Lens films
- List of Insane Coaster Wars episodes
- List of Inside the Actors Studio episodes
- List of Intervention episodes
- List of IRT: Deadliest Roads episodes

== J ==
- List of The Jay Leno Show episodes
- List of The Jimmy Dean Show episodes
- List of The Joe Schmo Show episodes
- List of The Joseph Smith Papers episodes
- List of The Joy of Painting episodes

== K ==
- List of Kelsey's Essentials episodes
- List of Kendra episodes

== L ==
- List of Larrymania episodes
- List of Last Week Tonight with John Oliver episodes
- List of The Late Late Show with James Corden episodes
- List of The Late Late Show with Craig Ferguson episodes
- List of Late Night with Jimmy Fallon episodes
- List of Late Night with Seth Meyers episodes
- List of Late Night with Conan O'Brien episodes
- List of The Late Show with Stephen Colbert episodes
- List of Lip Sync Battle episodes
- List of Summer House (2017 TV series) episodes
- List of Little Britches Rodeo episodes
- List of Live episodes
- List of Live PD episodes
- List of Live Rescue episodes
- List of Live with Kelly and Mark episodes
- List of Live with Kelly and Michael episodes
- List of Live with Kelly and Ryan episodes
- List of Live with Kelly episodes
- List of Live with Regis and Kelly episodes
- List of Lizard Lick Towing episodes
- List of Lost Tapes episodes
- List of Love It or List It episodes
- List of Lucha Libre USA: Masked Warriors episodes

== M ==
- List of Man vs. Wild episodes
- List of Manzo'd with Children episodes
- List of Marie episodes
- List of Marriage Boot Camp episodes
- List of guests appearing on The Midnight Special
- List of Modern Marvels episodes
- List of Most Shocking episodes
- List of My Super Sweet 16 episodes
- List of Mysteries and Scandals episodes
- List of Mystery Diagnosis episodes

== N ==
- List of Nailed It! episodes
- List of Naked and Afraid episodes
- List of Naked Science episodes
- List of Nathan for You episodes
- List of Nature episodes
- List of The New Detectives episodes
- List of The Nightly Show with Larry Wilmore episodes (2016)
- List of Nova episodes
- List of Nova episodes (seasons 1–20)
- List of Nova episodes (seasons 21–40)
- List of Nova episodes (seasons 41–present)

== O ==
- List of The Opposition with Jordan Klepper episodes
- List of Oprah's Lifeclass episodes
- List of Oprah Prime episodes

== P ==
- List of Paranormal State episodes
- List of Penn & Teller Tell a Lie episodes
- List of Penn & Teller: Bullshit! episodes
- List of Pimp My Ride episodes
- List of The Pioneer Woman episodes
- List of POV episodes
- List of Property Brothers episodes

== Q ==
- List of Queer Eye episodes

== R ==
- List of The Real Housewives of Dallas episodes
- List of The Real Housewives of Miami episodes
- List of The Real Housewives of Potomac episodes
- List of Real Time with Bill Maher episodes
- List of Rescue 911 episodes
- List of The Riveras episodes
- List of Rock and Roll Road Trip with Sammy Hagar episodes
- List of The Rosie Show episodes

== S ==
- List of Scariest Places on Earth episodes
- List of Seconds from Disaster episodes
- List of Secret Millionaire (American TV series) episodes
- List of Secrets of a Restaurant Chef episodes
- List of Shahs of Sunset episodes
- List of Shark Tank episodes
- List of Shipping Wars episodes
- List of Sightings episodes
- List of Sister Wives episodes
- List of Sons of Guns episodes
- List of Soul Train episodes
- List of Southern at Heart episodes
- List of Storage Wars episodes
- List of Storm Chasers episodes
- List of Supernanny (American TV series) episodes

== T ==
- List of T.I. & Tiny: The Family Hustle episodes
- List of Talking Dead episodes
- List of Teen Mom episodes
- List of Teen Mom 2 episodes
- List of Texas Flip N Move episodes
- List of Time Warp episodes
- List of Toddlers & Tiaras episodes
- List of Tom Green Live episodes
- List of The Tonight Show Starring Jimmy Fallon episodes
- List of The Tonight Show Starring Johnny Carson episodes
- List of The Tonight Show with Jay Leno episodes
- List of The Tonight Show episodes
- List of Too Cute episodes
- List of Top Chef episodes
- List of Top Chef VIP episodes
- List of Top Gear (American TV series) episodes
- List of Total Divas episodes
- List of Trisha's Southern Kitchen episodes
- List of True Life episodes
- List of TV Nation episodes

== U ==
- List of Unsolved History episodes
- List of Unsolved Mysteries episodes
- List of Unsung episodes

== V ==
- List of Vanderpump Rules episodes
- List of The Vanilla Ice Project episodes
- List of Vice episodes

== W ==
- List of War Stories with Oliver North episodes
- List of WCG Ultimate Gamer episodes
- List of Wicked Tuna episodes
- List of Wicked Tuna: Outer Banks episodes
- List of Wide Angle episodes
- List of Wild Kingdom episodes
- List of Wives with Knives episodes
- List of The Woodwright's Shop episodes
- List of Worth It episodes
- List of WWF Shotgun Saturday Night episodes

== Y ==
- List of Yo Momma episodes
