= List of Southern at Heart episodes =

The American cooking series Southern at Heart aired on Food Network from 2013 to 2016. 53 episodes of the series aired over five seasons.

== Episodes ==
=== Season 1 (2013) ===
No.	Title	Original air date	Production code
1	"Southern Sweets"	October 27, 2013	TBA
2	"Ultimate Down-Home Breakfast"	November 3, 2013	TBA
3	"Game Day!"	November 10, 2013	TBA
4	"Southern Comforts"	November 17, 2013	TBA
5	"Taste of Home"	November 24, 2013	TBA
6	"Touch of Bourbon"	December 1, 2013	TBA

=== Season 2 (2014) ===
No.	Title	Original air date	Production code
1	"Movie Snacking"	March 16, 2014	TBA
2	"Southern Italian"	March 23, 2014	TBA
3	"Pizza Party"	March 30, 2014	TBA
4	"Big Southern Salad"	April 6, 2014	TBA
5	"Family Feast"	April 13, 2014	TBA
6	"When the Flavors Come Marching In"	April 20, 2014	TBA
7	"Derby Party"	April 27, 2014	TBA
8	"Taco Tuesday"	May 4, 2014	TBA
9	"Ladies' Tea Party"	May 11, 2014	TBA
10	"Dinner for Two"	May 18, 2014	TBA
11	"Strong is the New Skinny"	May 25, 2014	TBA
12	"Grill and Chill"	June 1, 2014	TBA
13	"30 Dollar Date"	June 8, 2014	TBA

=== Season 3 (2014) ===
No.	Title	Original air date	Production code
1	"Late Night Feast"	October 26, 2014	TBA
2	"Tailgate at the Big Game"	November 2, 2014	TBA
3	"Picnic Day at the Races"	November 9, 2014	TBA
4	"Friends-Giving Leftovers"	November 16, 2014	TBA
5	"Light on Your Feet"	November 23, 2014	TBA
6	"Cocktail Party Bites"	November 30, 2014	TBA
7	"Gift Basket of Food"	December 7, 2014	TBA
8	"Card Game with Grampy"	December 14, 2014	TBA

=== Season 4 (2015) ===
No.	Title	Original air date	Production code
1	"Rainy Day Egg Hunt"	March 29, 2015	TBA
2	"Elevated Comfort Dinner"	April 5, 2015	TBA
3	"Treat Yourself Supper"	April 12, 2015	TBA
4	"Fancy Fun Finger Foods"	April 19, 2015	TBA
5	"Bourbon, Bacon, Boots Up!"	April 26, 2015	TBA
6	"Spicy Feast in the Bluegrass"	May 3, 2015	TBA
7	"Freezer Pleasers for Mom"	May 10, 2015	TBA
8	"Southern Fried Friendship"	May 24, 2015	TBA
9	"Phillips Family Grilltacular"	May 31, 2015	TBA
10	"Pecan-Encrusted With Love"	June 7, 2015	TBA
11	"PB&J Came to Play"	June 14, 2015	TBA
12	"Grampy's Got a Sweet Tooth"	June 21, 2015	TBA
13	"Pizza Jammin' All Night"	July 5, 2015	TBA

=== Season 5 (2015–2016) ===
No.	Title	Original air date	Production code
1	"Close to Home"	October 4, 2015	TBA
2	"Picking and Picnicking"	October 11, 2015	TBA
3	"Grandma's Cookbook"	October 18, 2015	TBA
4	"Carved and Sweetly Starved"	October 25, 2015	TBA
5	"Fairest of the Fair"	November 1, 2015	TBA
6	"Arrow to My Heart"	November 8, 2015	TBA
7	"Turkey Two Ways and Sweet Potato Heaven"	November 15, 2015	TBA
8	"Dinner Under the Stars"	November 29, 2015	TBA
9	"Newlyweds Under the Mistletoe"	December 6, 2015	TBA
10	"Catch Me If You Can"	January 3, 2016	TBA
11	"Game Night"	January 17, 2016	TBA
12	"Halftime Ham Sandwich"	January 31, 2016	TBA
13	"Home Alone"	February 28, 2016	TBA
