= List of Good Bones episodes =

Good Bones is an American reality television series airing on HGTV starring Karen E Laine and Mina Starsiak Hawk, based in Indianapolis, Indiana.

== Episodes ==
=== Series overview ===
Season	Episodes	Originally released	
Season	Episodes	First released	Last released
1	11	March 22, 2016	June 20, 2016
2	13	May 30, 2017	August 29, 2017
3	13	April 3, 2018	June 26, 2018
4	15	May 14, 2019	August 20, 2019
5	14	June 9, 2020	September 8, 2020
6	14	June 29, 2021	September 2021
7	13	July 12, 2022	November 2022
8	10	August 15, 2023	October 17, 2023

=== Season 1 (2016) ===
No. overall	No. in season	Title	Original release date
1	1	"Tiny House, Huge Transformation"	March 22, 2016
Mina and Karen purchase the Barth House for $15,000 in Fountain Square. Can they stay on budget and make a profit?
2	2	"An Old Victorian House Gets a New Facelift"	March 29, 2016
Mina and Karen purchase the Sanders House for $30,000 in Bates Hendricks. Can they stay on budget and make a profit?
3	3	"Tiny House Turns Into a Bohemian Bungalow"	April 5, 2016
Mina and Karen purchase the Elm House for $50,000 in North Square. Can they stay on budget and make a profit?
4	4	"A Neighborhood Eyesore That's a Horrible Before Becomes an Amazing After"	April 12, 2016
Mina and Karen purchase the Parkway House for $4,000 in Bates Hendricks. Can they stay on budget and make a profit?
5	5	"Making Space in the Suburbs for a Large Family"	April 19, 2016
Mina and Karen help renovate a House in Mooresville for a couple who desperately need more space for their large family without adding an addition. Can they provide more space for the couple?
6	6	"Family Reunion Renovation"	April 26, 2016
Mina and Karen renovate Mina's father Caseys House. Caseys wanted to renovate for five years but will he go through with it this time?
7	7	"An Old House Attracts New Neighbors"	May 3, 2016
Mina and Karen buy the North Square House next door to Mina for $130,000 in Fountain Square. Can they stay on budget and make a profit?
8	8	"A Structure Worth Saving"	May 10, 2016
Mina and Karen buy the Terrace House for $4,500 in Bates Hendricks. Can they stay on budget and make a profit?
9	9	"New Clients in the Countryside"	May 17, 2016
Mina and Karen travel to the Vanilla House in Mooresville to help Mike and Karen renovate their house. Can they liven the house up for the couple?
10	10	"Duplex Remodel is Double the Trouble"	May 24, 2016
Mina and Karen buy the Duplex House on Woodlawn for $15,000 in East of State. Can they stay on budget and make a profit?
11	11	"Mother and Daughter Duo Renovate Neighborhoods One House at a Time"	June 20, 2016
Mina and Karen buy the Wright Street House for $7,000 in Bates Hendricks. Can they stay on budget and make a profit?

=== Season 2 (2017) ===
No. overall	No. in season	Title	Original release date
12	1	"Decaying Duplex Gets a Transformation"	May 30, 2017
Mina and Karen buy the Orange Street Duplex House for $4,000 in Bates Hendricks. Can they stay on budget and make a profit?
13	2	"Abandoned Partially Built Home Gets Rescued"	June 6, 2017
Mina and Karen buy the Woodlawn Partial Build House for $45,000 in East of State. Can they stay on budget and make a profit?
14	3	"An Office Becomes a Home"	June 13, 2017
Mina and Karen buy the East Street Former Office House for $50,000 in Bates Hendricks. Can they stay on budget and make a profit?
15	4	"Little White House on a Hill"	June 20, 2017
Mina and Karen buy the Little Sanders House for $30,000 in Bates Hendricks. Can they stay on budget and make a profit?
16	5	"Flooded Two-Story Restored"	June 27, 2017
Mina and Karen buy the Terrace Avenue 2-Story House for $4,000 in Bates Hendricks, Can they stay on budget and make a profit?
17	6	"Big House, Big Potential"	July 11, 2017
Mina and Karen buy the Big Sanders House for $50,000 in Bates Hendricks. Can they stay on budget and make a profit?
18	7	"Facelift for a Tiny Victorian"	July 18, 2017
Mina and Karen buy the Little Woodlawn House for $40,000 in East of State. Can they stay on budget and make a profit?
19	8	"Client Renovation Rescue"	July 25, 2017
Mina and Karen help a homeowner Andy renovate his Fletcher Place Duplex House. Can they renovate Andys home into an income apartment while staying on budget?
20	9	"Eyesore Overhaul"	August 1, 2017
Mina and Karen buy the House on Sanders for $45,000 in Bates Hendricks. Can they stay on budget with making a profit?
21	10	"Beautifying a Boring Boxy Home"	August 8, 2017
Mina and Karen buy the Parkway Duplex House for $4,000 in Bates Hendricks. Can they stay on budget and make a profit?
22	11	"Small House, Big Problems"	August 15, 2017
Mina and Karen buy the Tiny Kennington House for $5,000 in bates Hendricks. Can they stay on budget and make a profit?
23	12	"Bugging Out on a Budget"	August 22, 2017
Mina and Karen buy the Singleton House for $35,000 in Bates Hendricks. Can they stay on budget and make a profit?
24	13	"Historical Hot Mess"	August 29, 2017
Mina and Karen buy the Little Lexington House for $65,000 in Fletcher Place. Can they stay on budget and make a profit?

=== Season 3 (2018) ===
No. overall	No. in season	Title	Original release date
25	1	"Smelly Shotgun House to Chic Downtown Home"	April 3, 2018
Mina and Karen buy the East Street House for $40,000 in Bates Hendricks. Can they stay on budget and make a profit?
26	2	"Saddest Home on Sanders Street"	April 10, 2018
Mina and Karen buy the Sanders House for $50,000 in Bates Hendricks. Can they stay on budget and make a profit?
27	3	"The Shabbiest Townhouse"	April 17, 2018
Mina and Karen buy the Sanders Townhome:East Side for $20,000 in Bates Hendricks. Can they stay on budget and make a profit?
28	4	"Outdated Townhome Gets a Funky Facelift"	April 24, 2018
Mina and Karen buy the Sanders Townhome:West Side for $25,000 in Bates Hendricks. Can they stay on budget and make a profit?
29	5	"Starting from Scratch in the Southside Neighborhood"	May 1, 2018
Mina and Karen buy the Orange Street House for $9,000 in Old Southside. Can they stay on budget and make a profit?
30	6	"The Half Million Dollar House"	May 8, 2018
Mina and Karen buy the Olive Street House for $125,000 in Bates Hendricks. Can they stay on budget and make a profit?
31	7	"Empty Lot to Home Sweet Home"	May 15, 2018
Mina and Karen buy the Hoyt Property for $35,000 in Fountain Square. Can they stay on budget and make a profit?
32	8	"The Little Brick House"	May 22, 2018
Mina and Karen buy the Orange Street House for $20,000 in the Old Southside. Can they stay on budget and make a profit?
33	9	"A Backyard Barn for Karen"	May 29, 2018
Mina and Karen tackle a special project, Karen's new barn-shaped guesthouse that she has been dreaming of for years. Can Karen achieve her dream?
34	10	"Risky Reno with Historic Charm"	June 5, 2018
Mina and Karen buy the Meridian Street House for $25,000 in Old Southside. Can they stay on budget and make a profit?
35	11	"A Stately Home Full of Slithering Surprises"	June 12, 2018
Mina and Karen team up with their friend Josh on a high-stakes property on Olive Street in Fountain Square. Will they be able to stick to the agreed budget?
36	12	"Poltergeist Property"	June 19, 2018
Mina and Karen buy the Orange Street House for $20,000 in Old Southside. Can they stay on budget and make a profit?
37	13	"Budget-Busting Victorian"	June 26, 2018
Mina and Karen buy the Capitol Street House for $18,000 in Old Northside. Can they stay on budget and make a profit?

=== Season 4 (2019) ===
No. overall	No. in season	Title	Original release date
38	1	"A Stately House on Sanders"	May 14, 2019
Mina and Karen buy the Sanders House for $65,000 in Bates Hendricks. Can they stay on budget and make a profit?
39	2	"New House, Old Spirit"	May 21, 2019
Mina and Karen buy the Market House for $4,000 just East of Downtown. Can they stay on budget and make a profit?
40	3	"Little Pink House on Palmer"	May 28, 2019
Mina and Karen buy the Palmer Street Duplex House for $30,000 just South of Downtown. Can they stay on budget and make a profit?
41	4	"Mina's Forever Home"	June 4, 2019
Mina plans to build her Forever Home on a lot she bought years previous, her plans are rushed with news of her pregnancy.
42	5	"Shiplap Surprise in Fountain Square"	June 11, 2019
Mina and Karen buy the Fletcher House for $100,000 in Fountain Square. Can they stay on budget and make a profit?
43	6	"Nothin's Easy on East Street"	June 18, 2019
Mina and Karen buy the East Street House for $50,000 in Bates Hendricks. Can they stay on budget and make a profit?
44	7	"Chop and Pop"	June 25, 2019
Mina and Karen buy the East Street House for $50,000 in Bates Hendricks. Can they stay on budget and make a profit?
45	8	"Battle of the Two Chicks"	July 2, 2019
Mina and Karen buy the East Street Townhomes for $140,000 in Bates Hendricks. Can they stay on budget and make a profit?
46	9	"First House on the Block"	July 9, 2019
Mina and Karen buy the Talbott Street House for $30,000 in Old Southside. Can they stay on budget and make a profit?
47	10	"Tiny Condo, Giant Upgrade"	July 16, 2019
Mina and Karen buy the Union Condo for $30,000 in Old Southside. Can they stay on budget and make a profit?
48	11	"Big Money in Fountain Square"	July 23, 2019
Mina and Karen buy the Lexington House for $100,000 in Fountain Square. Can they stay on budget and make a profit?
49	12	"Townhome of Trouble"	July 30, 2019
Mina and Karen buy the Talbott Street Townhome for $15,000 in Old Southside. Can they stay on budget and make a profit?
50	13	"Old Doors, New Wall"	August 6, 2019
Mina and Karen buy the Talbott Street Townhome for $15,000 in Old Southside. Can they stay on budget and make a profit?
51	14	"The Brickyard Brick House"	August 13, 2019
Mina and Karen buy the Minnesota Street House for $40,000 in Bates Hendricks. Can they stay on budget and make a profit?
52	15	"Keeping It in the Family"	August 20, 2019
Mina and Karen buy the Upstairs Condo for $40,000 in Old Southside. Can they stay on budget and make a profit?

=== Season 5 (2020) ===
No. overall	No. in season	Title	Original release date
53	1	"Fountain Square Flashback"	June 9, 2020
Mina and Karen return to Fountain Square to renovate a bungalow.
54	2	"Mina's East Street Investment"	June 16, 2020
Mina and her husband, Steve, decide it's time to renovate and sell their rental property to start a college fund for their son.
55	3	"Chelsea Vibes in Old Southside"	June 23, 2020
Mina and Karen buy a duplex of townhouses in Old Southside and want to give the left side a Chelsea flat theme full of eclectic colors like the New York City neighborhood; potential issues inside and out cause more challenges than expected.
56	4	"The Greenwich Village Townhome"	June 30, 2020
Mina and Karen return to Old Southside to renovate the right side of their duplex townhome using a Greenwich Village design; Karen shares a major announcement about her position in the company, and the ramifications of that change come to light.
57	5	"DIY Reno Rescue"	July 7, 2020
Mina and Karen are called to help their friends Mel and Curtis transform their traditional home, but their ideas are dependent on the local historical society; they expand the dining room and kitchen, and convert the master into a gorgeous en suite.
58	6	"Updated Victorian in Old Southside"	July 14, 2020
Mina and Karen are back in Old Southside, where they've purchased a hoarder house filled with garbage and hiding fire damage; as demo gets underway, they uncover a slew of other issues as they turn this home into an updated Victorian beauty.
59	7	"Old Biker Bar"	July 21, 2020
Mina and Karen return to the Old Southside neighborhood to transform an old motorcycle biker bar into a single-family home; the former hangout gets a massive two-story addition and industrial-modern designs that pay homage to its biker roots.
60	8	"Free House, Expensive Reno"	July 28, 2020
Mina and Karen venture into a new neighborhood where Mina acquired a home from a real estate friend; a serious problem arises with the small cottage and making a profit becomes an hurdle.
61	9	"MJ's Dream Home"	August 4, 2020
Two Chicks and a Hammer's design assistant, MJ, and his husband recently bought their first home, and Mina and Karen want to make MJ's dreams a reality. The duo works to blend traditional and modern styles.
62	10	"The Boho Bungalow"	August 11, 2020
Mina and Karen begin work on a home in Garfield Park; with a tight budget and narrow profit margin, the team must harness its creative juices to turn the tiny property into a boho-themed bungalow that is worthy of an aspiring artist.
63	11	"Cottage Becomes Artistic Oasis"	August 18, 2020
Jim and Shauta run a nonprofit helping artists find affordable housing in the Garfield Park neighborhood of Indianapolis, and they've enlisted Mina and Karen to help give one of their dilapidated properties a big makeover on a small budget.
64	12	"Tad's Tiny Home"	August 25, 2020
Mina and Karen are back in the Bates-Hendricks neighborhood for a different kind of home renovation; an old garage on one of their existing rental properties is the ideal location to build a tiny home for Mina's brother, Tad.

=== Season 6 (2021) ===
No. overall	No. in season	Title	Original release date
65	1	"Scary to Chic in Old Southside"	June 29, 2021
66	2	"A Charred Charmer for Cory"	July 6, 2021
67	3	"Tiny Condo, Big Reno"	July 13, 2021
68	4	"Bringing in the Buyers"	July 20, 2021
69	5	"New Babies and New Neighborhoods"	July 27, 2021
70	6	"Big Build, Big Risk"	August 3, 2021
71	7	"Claire's Crooked Cottage"	August 10, 2021
72	8	"From Warehouse to Storefront"	August 17, 2021
Mina and Karen decide to update their commercial building in Bates-Hendricks. They turn the bedraggled storage space into a boutique store and bistro called "Two Chicks District Co."
73	9	"From Teardown to Italian Treasure"	August 24, 2021
74	10	"Pricey Paradise with Big Problems"	August 31, 2021
75	11	"Starting From Scratch in the Old Southside"	September 7, 2021
76	12	"Eclectic Artistry in Garfield Park"	September 14, 2021
77	13	"California Dreaming in Indy"	September 21, 2021
78	14	"Historic Cottage for First-Time Flippers"	September 28, 2021

=== Season 7 (2022) ===
No. overall	No. in season	Title	Original release date
79	1	"Quaint Cottage With Vintage Vibes"	July 12, 2022
Mina and Karen are back in Fountain Square with a quaint but expensive cottage; in order to list this pricey property high enough to make a profit, they must figure out how to add plenty of bells and whistles without losing its vintage charm.
80	2	"Eastside Americana Cottage"	July 19, 2022
In Near Eastside, Mina and Karen hope a two-story addition with an Americana cottage design will turn a heftier profit than the area's last project; after finding a series of mysterious holes, the team worries the home will become a money pit.
81	3	"Budget-Busting Basic Bombshell"	July 26, 2022
Mina and Karen make a risky move and purchase a huge house in a relatively new neighborhood. With one budget-busting issue after another, the team has to make money - saving design choices to create a neutral home that has bombshell appeal.
82	4	"Big Red Urban Barn"	August 2, 2022
Mina and the team return to Old Southside to tackle the smallest home on the block. The house needs to get bigger to make a profit, so Mina plans to add a second floor and red siding for an urban barn feel, but a snafu could set the team back weeks.
83	5	"From Burned Out to Boho Nordic"	August 9, 2022
Mina and Karen have bought one of the worst homes in Old Southside that has major fire damage. And with a tiny yard and a small footprint, they'll need to transform this burned-out ramshackle into a stunning two-story boho or it may be another bust.
84	6	"Major Mansion Makeover"	August 16, 2022
Mina is renovating the home of professional basketball player Justin Holiday and his family. In hopes of expanding her business into more client renovations, Mina's goal is to turn this outdated mansion into a modern oasis before Justin's season begins.
85	7	"Two Chicks Forever Home"	August 30, 2022
The Two Chicks team is ready to break ground on their new headquarters, and Mina hopes the 6,000 square foot building will provide plenty of storage and office space. Now, the race is on to finish the new location before their current lease expires.
86	8	"Framing Fiasco in the Valley"	October 18, 2022
Mina and the team take on their first home in the Valley, a neighborhood they've never ventured into before. But with no comps in the area and major framing issues, Mina must pull out all the stops if she wants to see a return on this risky investment.
87	9	"The Wedding Studio"	October 25, 2022
Mina tackles her biggest challenge yet as she renovates her best friend's 6,000 square foot bridal shop. This could be the project that jump-starts more high-end commercial renos, and with only 60 days to the grand opening, Mina and the team must deliver.
88	10	"Soft Stark Southside House"	November 1, 2022
Mina and the team are back in Old Southside to take on a house Mina has purchased sight unseen. The structure has no foundation and must be torn down, and with an aggressive time line, the problematic property could sink her plans of turning a quick sale.
89	11	"Little But Luxurious"	November 22, 2022
Mina and the team are back in the Valley to build one of their smallest homes yet. With a driveway-sized property that's only 16 feet wide, the team must figure out how to create a long and skinny new build that packs all the luxury for a potential buyer.
90	12	"An Itty Bitty Beach Bungalow"	August 23, 2022
Mina and Karen are back in Old Southside where they look to transform a small, two-bedroom home into a beautiful beach bungalow on a modest budget. If they make a decent profit, Mina plans to realize her dream of building a Two Chicks Headquarters.
91	13	"Twinning Is Winning"	November 8, 2022
After the success of her last Charles Street home, Mina decides to create a twin property by duplicating the floorplan and adding a cabin chic vibe. But with one failed inspection after another, the team faces delays that place the entire project at risk.

=== Season 8 (2023) ===
No. overall	No. in season	Title	Original release date
92	1	"Income Property Issues"	August 15, 2023
The season opener follows Mina, Karen and the team as they revamp a junk-filled duplex, complete with an attic space and a basement located in the Bates-Hendricks neighborhood. To turn a profit, Mina transforms the attic into a rental income unit for the new homeowners by adding bedrooms, a kitchen and living room, all with a modern touch.
93	2	"Secret Sanctuary on Singleton"	August 22, 2023
Mina and the team return to Bates-Hendricks to take on their second home on Singleton Street; with vaulted ceilings and a secret room in the kitchen, this serene, spa-like house needs serious wow factor to lure in the area's picky buyers.
94	3	"Historical Hiccups on Hill Street"	August 29, 2023
Mina and the team are in Irvington renovating a charming historical house on Hill Street. But after running into issues with the city, Mina has her work cut out for her to create an eclectic mid-mod villa while upholding its historical integrity.
95	4	"Money Pit Mishaps"	September 5, 2023
Mina and the team are back in Bates-Hendricks to remodel an old home with a two story addition and a separate income suite. But after major issues arise during framing, Mina is challenged to stay on budget to create a durable, deluxe getaway.
96	5	"Falling Head Ova Heels in Fountain Square"	September 12, 2023
Mina is helping her friend convert a historic Fountain Square home into a salon for her own beauty business. They plan to add a coffee shop into the renovation, but things could turn ugly when the health department steps in with other ideas.
97	6	"City Slickers Go Country"	September 19, 2023
Mina and the team take on the family home of Two Chicks' build manager, Brittany, in the country town of New Castle. To get top dollar for her client, Mina must figure out how to step out of her urban comfort zone and adapt to a more rural market.
98	7	"New Build, New Business"	September 26, 2023
After losing money on their last house, Mina and the team hope to get top dollar by doing an upscale new build on the lot next door. Mina decides to balance out the new construction blandness with antique doors, but a mishap could derail the project.
99	8	"The Problem Project Pivot"	October 3, 2023
Mina and the team take on a four-dwelling new build consisting of a duplex and a carriage house. But when things go wrong with the foundation of the duplex, the focus shifts to executing the carriage house so it can begin earning rental income.
100	9	"All in the Family"	October 10, 2023
The Two Chicks team takes on dream home renovations for Mina's brother, Tad, and her sister, Kelsy. Tad's ready for the next big steps in his life with his girlfriend and new business, while Mina and Kelsey try to find common ground with design choices.
101	10	"Tad's Next Chapter"	October 17, 2023
Tad and Anna's dream home nears completion, but their moody and quirky design style poses a challenge for Mina. And despite the pressure of the renovation, Tad considers taking yet another big, life-changing step with Anna.
