= List of Total Divas episodes =

Total Divas is an American reality television series that premiered on July 28, 2013, on E! The series gave viewers an inside look of the lives of female WWE Superstars (formerly known as Divas) from their work within WWE to their personal lives. Behind the scene footage of the Divas is also included.

In June 2021, Essentially Sports reported that the E! Network had cancelled Total Divas and its sister show Total Bellas, citing low ratings and a lack of interest from those involved.

== Series overview ==
Season	Episodes	Originally released	
Season	Episodes	First released	Last released
1	14	July 28, 2013	December 15, 2013
2	11	March 16, 2014	June 1, 2014
3	20	September 7, 2014	March 8, 2015
4	13	July 7, 2015	September 29, 2015
5	14	January 19, 2016	April 19, 2016
6	16	November 16, 2016	May 10, 2017
7	12	November 1, 2017	January 31, 2018
8	10	September 19, 2018	November 28, 2018
9	10	October 1, 2019	December 10, 2019

== Episodes ==
=== Season 1 (2013) ===
No. overall	No. in season	Title	Original release date	Prod. code	U.S. viewers (millions)
1	1	"Welcome to the WWE"	July 28, 2013	101	1.34
2	2	"A Tango With Fandango"	August 4, 2013	102	1.52
3	3	"Planet Funk is Funked Up"	August 11, 2013	103	1.67
4	4	"The Fat Twin"	August 18, 2013	104	1.34
5	5	"Feuding Funkadactyls"	August 25, 2013	105	1.46
6	6	"Diva Las Vegas"	September 1, 2013	106	1.52
7	7	"A Leg Up"	September 8, 2013	107	1.09
8	8	"No Longer The Bridesmaid"	September 15, 2013	108	1.03
-	-	"Total Divas After Party"	September 15, 2013	-	0.93
9	9	"Summer Slam"	November 10, 2013	109	1.25
10	10	"Nurse Nikki"	November 17, 2013	110	1.41
11	11	"Seeing Red"	November 24, 2013	111	0.92
12	12	"Get That Chingle Chingle"	December 1, 2013	112	1.44
13	13	"Saying Goodbye"	December 8, 2013	113	1.20
14	14	"Ready to Ride"	December 15, 2013	114	1.29

=== Season 2 (2014) ===
Summer Rae joined the cast of Total Divas; JoJo departed as a series regular.

No. overall	No. in season	Title	Original release date	Prod. code	U.S. viewers (millions)
15	1	"New Diva on the Block" "Without John"^{1}	March 16, 2014	201	1.07
16	2	"The Braniel Bus"	March 23, 2014	202	1.28
17	3	"On Brie's Bad Side"	March 30, 2014	203	1.55
18	4	"Inhale, Exhale"	April 13, 2014	204	1.16
19	5	"For Better or For Worse"	April 20, 2014	205	1.39
20	6	"The House Sitters"	April 27, 2014	206	1.14
21	7	"Flirting With Fandango"	May 4, 2014	207	0.96
22	8	"Red and Gold"	May 11, 2014	208	0.75
23	9	"What Happens In Cabo"	May 18, 2014	209	1.31
24	10	"Digging A Hole"	May 25, 2014	210	1.04
25	11	"Wedding Mania"	June 1, 2014	211	1.54

Notes

1. "New Diva On The Block" was renamed "Without John" when it was added to the WWE Network.

=== Season 3 (2014–15) ===
Alicia Fox, Paige, and Rosa Mendes joined the cast of Total Divas; Naomi and Summer Rae departed as series regulars.

No. overall	No. in season	Title	Original release date	Prod. code	U.S. viewers (millions)
26	1	"Eggs Over Freezing"	September 7, 2014	301	1.20
27	2	"Mo' Marriage, Mo' Problems"	September 14, 2014	302	0.97
28	3	"Roadside Rumble"	September 21, 2014	303	1.18
29	4	"Divas Unchained"	September 28, 2014	304	0.99
30	5	"Scared Straight"	October 5, 2014	305	1.05
31	6	"Paint the Island Red"	October 12, 2014	306	0.88
32	7	"The Double-Cross"	October 12, 2014	307	0.97
33	8	"Cross Country Catastrophe"	October 19, 2014	308	0.86
34	9	"Daddy's Little Girl"	October 19, 2014	309	0.83
35	10	"The Divas Are Taking Over"	October 26, 2014	310	1.13
36	11	"Her Highness"	January 4, 2015	311	1.41
37	12	"Baby Not On Board"	January 11, 2015	312	1.30
38	13	"Twin Leaks"	January 18, 2015	313	1.25
39	14	"Insecurity Breach"	January 25, 2015	314	1.25
40	15	"Girl vs. Girl Bye"	February 8, 2015	315	1.08
41	16	"All Hail Brie Mode"	February 15, 2015	316	0.91
42	17	"Mo' Money, Mo' Purses"	February 22, 2015	317	1.06
43	18	"Model Behavior"	March 1, 2015	318	1.40
44	19	"Indecent Exposure"	March 8, 2015	319	1.21
45	20	"The New Divas Champion"	March 8, 2015	320	1.28

=== Season 4 (2015) ===
Naomi rejoined the cast of Total Divas; Cameron and Rosa Mendes departed as series regulars.

No. overall	No. in season	Title	Original release date	Prod. code	U.S. viewers (millions)
46	1	"Diva Divide"	July 7, 2015	401	0.97
47	2	"She Said, She Said"	July 14, 2015	402	1.03
48	3	"Eat Your Heart Out"	July 21, 2015	403	0.99
49	4	"Divas on Overdrive"	July 28, 2015	404	1.08
50	5	"Tea Mode"	August 4, 2015	405	1.01
51	6	"Good Diva, Bad Diva"	August 11, 2015	406	1.17
52	7	"No Holds Barre"	August 18, 2015	407	1.03
53	8	"It's a Beautiful Life?"	August 25, 2015	408	0.92
54	9	"Clash of the Divas"	September 1, 2015	409	1.02
55	10	"Gone With the Wine"	September 8, 2015	410	1.14
56	11	"An Unwanted Proposal"	September 15, 2015	411	0.80
57	12	"Some Like It Hot"	September 22, 2015	412	0.79
58	13	"Return of the Ex"	September 29, 2015	413	1.15

=== Season 5 (2016) ===
Mandy Rose joined the cast of Total Divas, as well as Rosa Mendes rejoining; Naomi departed as a series regular.

No. overall	No. in season	Title	Original release date	Prod. code	U.S. viewers (millions)
59	1	"Love Triangle"	January 19, 2016	501	1.12
60	2	"A SummerSlam Engagement"	January 26, 2016	502	0.94
61	3	"The Truth About Cats and Divas"	February 2, 2016	503	0.84
62	4	"Talk of The Town"	February 9, 2016	504	0.81
63	5	"Come Reign or Shine"	February 16, 2016	505	0.80
64	6	"End of a Friendship?"	February 23, 2016	506	0.77
65	7	"Hart of the Matter"	March 1, 2016	507	0.59
66	8	"Peace of Cake"	March 8, 2016	508	0.58
67	9	"Rocky Road to Recovery"	March 15, 2016	509	0.65
68	10	"No Retreat"	March 22, 2016	510	0.66
69	11	"Clothes Quarters"	March 29, 2016	511	0.56
70	12	"Baby Talk"	April 5, 2016	512	0.64
71	13	"C'est La Divas (Part 1)"	April 12, 2016	513	0.63
72	14	"C'est La Divas (Part 2)"	April 19, 2016	514	0.62

=== Season 6 (2016–17) ===
Lana, Maryse, and Renee Young joined the cast of Total Divas, as well as Naomi rejoining; Alicia Fox, Mandy Rose, and Rosa Mendes departed as series regulars.

No. overall	No. in season	Title	Original release date	Prod. code	U.S. viewers (millions)
73	1	"Total Superstars"	November 16, 2016	601	0.72
74	2	"Orlando Strong"	November 23, 2016	602	0.46
75	3	"A Big Flippin' Deal"	November 30, 2016	603	0.59
76	4	"Gone Girl"	December 7, 2016	604	0.56
77	5	"Mother of the Groom"	December 14, 2016	605	0.55
78	6	"Too Many Cooks"	December 21, 2016	606	0.70
79	7	"A Win-Wine Situation"	January 4, 2017	607	0.73
80	8	"Pain in The Neck"	January 11, 2017	608	0.58
81	9	"What Happens in Vegas..."	January 18, 2017	609	0.58
82	10	"The Big Day"	January 25, 2017	610	0.69
83	11	"The Draft"	April 5, 2017	611	0.66
84	12	"Feel the Glow"	April 12, 2017	612	0.59
85	13	"Group-Sext"	April 19, 2017	613	0.58
86	14	"Runaway Bride"	April 26, 2017	614	0.56
87	15	"Swimming With Pigs"	May 3, 2017	615	0.57
88	16	"Total Summerslam"	May 10, 2017	616	0.68

=== Season 7 (2017–18) ===
Alexa Bliss, Carmella, and Nia Jax joined the cast of Total Divas; Eva Marie, Paige, and Renee Young departed as series regulars.

No. overall	No. in season	Title	Original release date	Prod. code	U.S. viewers (millions)
89	1	"This Is Make or Break"	November 1, 2017	701	0.55
90	2	"Dressed Like A Champ"	November 8, 2017	702	0.50
91	3	"Breaking All The Rules"	November 15, 2017	703	0.62
92	4	"The Diva Divide"	November 29, 2017	704	0.54
93	5	"The Bella Rush"	December 6, 2017	705	0.56
94	6	"Divas Gone Wild"	December 13, 2017	706	0.51
95	7	"Fake It 'Til You Make It"	December 20, 2017	707	0.61
96	8	"Single in the City"	January 3, 2018	708	0.68
97	9	"Three Alarm Fire"	January 10, 2018	709	0.51
98	10	"Shall We Dance?"	January 17, 2018	710	0.59
99	11	"Let's Get Naked!"	January 24, 2018	711	0.60
100	12	"Breaking the News"	January 31, 2018	712	0.66

=== Season 8 (2018) ===
Paige rejoined the cast of Total Divas; Alexa Bliss, Carmella, and Maryse departed as series regulars.

No. overall	No. in season	Title	Original release date	Prod. code	U.S. viewers (millions)
101	1	"Good Girls Don't Make History"	September 19, 2018	801	0.45
102	2	"This Is My House"	September 26, 2018	802	0.39
103	3	"The Real Nicole" "Risky Behavior"	October 3, 2018	803	0.36
104	4	"Paige's Secret"	October 10, 2018	804	0.38
105	5	"Pink Hair Don't Care"	October 17, 2018	805	0.34
106	6	"Welcome to Miami"	October 24, 2018	806	0.39
107	7	"Chase Your Dreams"	October 31, 2018	807	0.38
108	8	"Hate Is a Strong Word"	November 7, 2018	808	0.38
109	9	"A Sisterhood Beyond Blood"	November 14, 2018	809	0.41
110	10	"Unbreakable Force"	November 28, 2018	810	0.41

=== Season 9 (2019) ===
Ronda Rousey and Sonya Deville joined the cast of Total Divas, as well as Carmella rejoining; Brie & Nikki Bella, Lana, and Paige departed as series regulars.

No. overall	No. in season	Title	Original release date	Prod. code	U.S. viewers (millions)
111	1	"The Baddest Women on the Planet"	October 1, 2019	901	0.25
112	2	"All Is Fair In Love and War"	October 8, 2019	902	0.26
113	3	"Rowdy Ronda"	October 15, 2019	903	0.28
114	4	"Damage Control"	October 22, 2019	904	0.27
115	5	"The Real Ronda"	October 29, 2019	905	0.28
116	6	"MountainMania"	November 5, 2019	906	0.19
117	7	"I Will Prevail"	November 12, 2019	907	0.25
118	8	"35 Years in the Making"	November 19, 2019	908	0.29
119	9	"Hawaiian Punch"	December 3, 2019	909	0.24
120	10	"The Next Wave"	December 10, 2019	910	0.22
