= List of Tom Green Live episodes =

Tom Green Live is a talk show television series hosted by Tom Green that aired weekly on AXS TV from October 2013 to November 2014. This is not to be confused with Green's 2006-2011 web show of the same title, which was later renamed "Tom Green's House Tonight". The show was a one-hour format show with Green interviewing his guest(s).

The following is a complete list of Tom Green Live episodes.

== Series overview ==
Season	Episodes	Originally released	
Season	Episodes	First released	Last released
1	7	October 3, 2013	November 14, 2013
2	13	January 9, 2014	April 3, 2014
3	24	June 12, 2014	November 20, 2014

== Episodes ==
=== Season 1 (2013) ===
No. overall	No. in season	Guest(s)	Original release date
1	1	Richard Belzer	October 3, 2013
2	2	Howie Mandel	October 10, 2013
3	3	Tony Hawk	October 17, 2013
4	4	Eric Andre and Henry Rollins	October 24, 2013
5	5	Artie Lange	November 7, 2013
6	6	Andrew Dice Clay	November 14, 2013
7	7	Russell Peters	November 20, 2013

=== Season 2 (2014) ===
No. overall	No. in season	Guest(s)	Original release date
8	1	Norm Macdonald	January 9, 2014
9	2	Dan Rather	January 16, 2014
10	3	Andy Dick	January 23, 2014
11	4	Cheech & Chong	January 30, 2014
12	5	Carrot Top	February 6, 2013
13	6	Sandra Bernhard	February 13, 2014
14	7	The Workaholics (Blake Anderson, Adam DeVine and Anders Holm)	February 20, 2014
15	8	Jason Ellis	February 27, 2014
16	9	Sebastian Bach and Kat Von D	March 6, 2014
17	10	Brody Stevens, Neil Hamburger and Tom Green's parents (Richard & Mary Jane)	March 13, 2014
18	11	Seth Green	March 20, 2014
19	12	Tim Matheson	March 27, 2014
20	13	Dr. Drew	April 3, 2014

=== Season 3 (2014) ===
No. overall	No. in season	Guest(s)	Original release date
21	1	Steve Carell	June 12, 2014
22	2	Stacy Keach, David Faustino and Nick Thune	June 19, 2014
23	3	Carl Reiner	June 26, 2014
24	4	Dana Carvey and Buzz Aldrin	July 3, 2014
25	5	Bob Saget and La Toya Jackson	July 10, 2014
26	6	Adam Carolla	July 17, 2014
27	7	"Weird Al" Yankovic	July 24, 2014
28	8	Alan Thicke and family	July 31, 2014
29	9	Marlon Wayans and Harland Williams	August 7, 2014
30	10	Steve-O and Charlyne Yi	August 14, 2014
31	11	Paul Rodriguez	August 21, 2014
32	12	Larry King	August 28, 2014
33	13	Chris D'Elia, Bryan Callen and Will Sasso	September 4, 2014
34	14	Trailer Park Boys	September 11, 2014
35	15	Ed Asner and Bobby Lee	September 18, 2014
36	16	Chris Kattan and Super Dave Osborne	September 25, 2014
37	17	Kevin Nealon	October 2, 2014
38	18	Bill Burr and Garrett Morris	October 9, 2014
39	19	Dane Cook and Heather McDonald	October 16, 2014
40	20	John Mulaney and Aisha Tyler	October 23, 2014
41	21	Jay Mohr and Bobak Ferdowsi	October 30, 2014
42	22	Dick Cavett and Sammy Hagar	November 6, 2014
43	23	Verne Troyer and Jimmy Pardo	November 13, 2014
44	24	Andrew Dice Clay	November 20, 2014
