= List of The Late Show with Stephen Colbert episodes =

1,801 episodes of The Late Show with Stephen Colbert aired from September 8, 2015, to May 21, 2026. The hour-long show American late-night talk show aired weeknights at 11:35 pm Eastern/10:35 pm Central on CBS in the United States, hosted by actor, comedian and critic Stephen Colbert, an alumnus of The Daily Show and former host of The Colbert Report. Louis Cato and The Late Show Band served as the show's house band.
