= List of Brunch at Bobby's episodes =

The American cooking-themed television series Brunch at Bobby's has aired on Food Network since 2016, after initially airing on sister station Cooking Channel from 2010 to 2015. As of June 2021, 92 episodes of the series have aired over seven seasons, with the most recent episode airing on January 7, 2017.

== Episodes ==
=== Season 1 (2010–2011) ===
No.	Title	Original air date	Production code
1	"South of the Border" (Note: "South of the Border" was produced as the eighth episode of the first season, but it aired as the first episode of the season.)	October 6, 2010	CCBAB-108H
2	"Cuisine du Jour" (Note: "Cuisine du Jour" was produced as the fourth episode of the first season, but it aired as the second episode of the season.)	October 23, 2010	CCBAB-104H
3	"Buon Appetito" (Note: "Buon Appetito" was produced as the first episode of the first season, but it aired as the third episode of the season.)	October 30, 2010	CCBAB-101H
4	"Luck of the Irish" (Note: "Luck of the Irish" was produced as the second episode of the first season, but it aired as the fourth episode of the season.)	November 6, 2010	CCBAB-102H
5	"Siesta Fiesta"	November 13, 2010	CCBAB-105H
6	"Stephanie's Favorites" (Note: "Stephanie's Favorites" was produced as the seventh episode of the first season and "The Big Easy" was produced as the sixth episode of the season, but the two episodes aired in opposite order.)	November 20, 2010	CCBAB-107H
7	"The Big Easy"	November 27, 2010	CCBAB-106H
8	"Off to the Races" (Note: "Off to the Races" was produced as the third episode of the first season, but it aired as the eighth episode of the season.)	December 4, 2010	CCBAB-103H
9	"Bite Size Brunch" (Note: "Bite Size Brunch" was produced as the tenth episode of the first season and "Slumber Party" was produced as the ninth episode of the season, but the two episodes aired in opposite order.)	December 11, 2010	CCBAB-110H
10	"Slumber Party"	December 25, 2010	CCBAB-109H
11	"Brunch That Does a Body Good"	January 1, 2011	CCBAB-111H

=== Season 2 (2011) ===
No.	Title	Original air date	Production code
1	"Tuscan Brunch" (Note: "Tuscan Brunch" was produced as the third episode of the second season, but it aired as the first episode of the season.)	October 8, 2011	CCBAB-203H
2	"A Royal Brunch" (Note: "A Royal Brunch" was produced as the seventh episode of the second season, but it aired as the second episode of the season.)	October 15, 2011	CCBAB-207H
3	"Brunch on the Go" (Note: "Brunch on the Go" was produced as the fifth episode of the second season, but it aired as the third episode of the season.)	September 10, 2011	CCBAB-205H
4	"Brunch Americain" (Note: "Brunch Americain" was produced as the ninth episode of the second season, but it aired as the fourth episode of the season.)	September 24, 2011	CCBAB-209H
5	"Deli-Icious Brunch" (Note: "Deli-Icious Brunch" was produced as the first episode of the second season, but it aired as the fifth episode of the season.)	October 1, 2011	CCBAB-201H
6	"Southern Comfort Brunch"	October 8, 2011	CCBAB-206H
7	"Brasserie Brunch" (Note: "Brasserie Brunch" was produced as the fourth episode of the second season, but it aired as the seventh episode of the season.)	October 15, 2011	CCBAB-204H
8	"Brunch for a Bunch" (Note: "Brunch for a Bunch" was produced as the tenth episode of the second season and "Caribbean Brunch" was produced as the eighth episode of the season, but the two episodes aired in opposite order.)	October 22, 2011	CCBAB-210H
9	"Chocolate Lovers Delight" (Note: "Chocolate Lovers Delight" was produced as the second episode of the second season, but it aired as the ninth episode of the season.)	October 27, 2011	CCBAB-202H
10	"Caribbean Brunch"	November 5, 2011	CCBAB-208H

=== Season 3 (2013) ===
No.	Title	Original air date	Production code
1	"Tasty Trattoria Brunch" (Note: "Tasty Trattoria Brunch" was produced as the third episode of the third season, but it aired as the first episode of the season.)	January 3, 2013	CCBAB-303H
2	"Brunch Bites Across Europe" (Note: "Brunch Bites Across Europe" was produced as the fifth episode of the third season and "Southern Brunch" was produced as the second episode of the season, but the two episodes aired in opposite order.)	January 10, 2013	CCBAB-305H
3	"Vermont Bed & Breakfast Style" (Note: "Vermont Bed & Breakfast Style" was produced as the sixth episode of the third season, but it aired as the third episode of the season.)	January 17, 2013	CCBAB-306H
4	"Best of the Pacific Northwest" (Note: "Best of the Pacific Northwest" was produced as the tenth episode of the third season and "Bay City Brunch" was produced as the fourth episode of the season, but the two episodes aired in opposite order.)	January 24, 2013	CCBAB-310H
5	"Southern Brunch"	January 31, 2013	CCBAB-302H
6	"Bourbon Street" (Note: "Bourbon Street" was produced as the eleventh episode of the third season, but it aired as the sixth episode of the season.)	February 14, 2013	CCBAB-311H
7	"Sizzling South Beach Brunch" (Note: "Sizzling South Beach Brunch" was produced as the first episode of the third season, but it aired as the seventh episode of the season.)	February 21, 2013	CCBAB-301H
8	"Bold Southwestern Brunch" (Note: "Bold Southwestern Brunch" was produced as the twelfth episode of the third season, but it aired as the eighth episode of the season.)	February 28, 2013	CCBAB-312H
9	"Open House Brunch" (Note: "Open House Brunch" was produced as the thirteenth episode of the third season, but it aired as the ninth episode of the season.)	March 7, 2013	CCBAB-313H
10	"Bay City Brunch"	March 14, 2013	CCBAB-304H
11	"A Basket of Brunch Goodies" (Note: "A Basket of Brunch Goodies" was produced as the seventh episode of the third season, but it aired as the eleventh episode of the season.)	March 21, 2013	CCBAB-307H
12	"Flavors of New England" (Note: "Flavors of New England" was produced as the ninth episode of the third season, but it aired as the twelfth episode of the season.)	March 28, 2013	CCBAB-309H
13	"Beach-y Keen Brunch" (Note: "Beach-y Keen Brunch" was produced as the eighth episode of the third season, but it aired as the thirteenth episode of the season.)	April 4, 2013	CCBAB-308H
14	"A French Countryside Picnic"	April 11, 2013	CCBAB-314H
15	"Brunch on Bourbon Street" (Note: "Brunch on Bourbon Street" was produced as the eleventh episode of the third season, but it aired as the final episode of the season.)	November 23, 2013	CCBAB-311H

=== Season 4 (2014) ===
No.	Title	Original air date	Production code
1	"New Orleans Brunch" (Note: "New Orleans Brunch" was produced as the eleventh episode of the fourth season, but it aired as the first episode of the season.)	March 4, 2014	CCBAB-411H
2	"French-American Brunch" (Note: "French-American Brunch" was produced as the third episode of the fourth season, but it aired as the second episode of the season.)	March 11, 2014	CCBAB-403H
3	"Southwest Brunch" (Note: "Southwest Brunch" was produced as the seventh episode of the fourth season, but it aired as the third episode of the season.)	March 18, 2014	CCBAB-407H
4	"Wine Country" (Note: "Wine Country" was produced as the eighth episode of the fourth season, but it aired as the fourth episode of the season.)	March 25, 2014	CCBAB-408H
5	"Winter Weekend Brunch" (Note: "Winter Weekend Brunch" was produced as the twelfth episode of the fourth season, but it aired as the fifth episode of the season.)	April 1, 2014	CCBAB-412H
6	"Springtime Brunch" (Note: "Springtime Brunch" was produced as the final episode of the fourth season and "Marrakesh Express Brunch" was produced as the sixth episode of the season, but the two episodes aired in opposite order.)	April 8, 2014	CCBAB-413H
7	"Trattoria Brunch" (Note: "Trattoria Brunch" was produced as the ninth episode of the fourth season, but it aired as the seventh episode of the season.)	April 15, 2014	CCBAB-409H
8	"Bread-Y for Brunch" (Note: "Bread-Y for Brunch" was produced as the tenth episode of the fourth season, but it aired as the eighth episode of the season.)	April 22, 2014	CCBAB-410H
9	"Mexican Brunch" (Note: "Mexican Brunch" was produced as the first episode of the fourth season, but it aired as the ninth episode of the season.)	April 29, 2014	CCBAB-401H
10	"Impress Your Guests" (Note: "Impress Your Guests" was produced as the fifth episode of the fourth season, but it aired as the tenth episode of the season.)	May 6, 2014	CCBAB-405H
11	"Farmer's Market Brunch" (Note: "Farmer's Market Brunch" was produced as the second episode of the fourth season, but it aired as the eleventh episode of the season.)	May 13, 2014	CCBAB-402H
12	"Chocolate Brunch" (Note: "Chocolate Brunch" was produced as the fourth episode of the fourth season, but it aired as the twelfth episode of the season.)	May 20, 2014	CCBAB-404H
13	"Marrakesh Express Brunch"	May 27, 2014	CCBAB-406H

=== Season 5 (2015) ===
No.	Title	Original air date	Production code
1	"Waffles Gone Wild" (Note: "Waffles Gone Wild" was produced as the fourth episode of the fifth season, but it aired as the first episode of the season.)	January 3, 2015	CCBAB-504H
2	"Wake Up Brunch" (Note: "Wake Up Brunch" was produced as the fifth episode of the fifth season, but it aired as the second episode of the season.)	January 17, 2015	CCBAB-505H
3	"Say Cheese" (Note: "Say Cheese" was produced as the eighth episode of the fifth season, but it aired as the third episode of the season.)	January 24, 2015	CCBAB-508H
4	"Brunch on the Run" (Note: "Brunch on the Run" was produced as the twelfth episode of the fifth season, but it aired as the fourth episode of the season.)	January 31, 2015	CCBAB-512H
5	"Chocoholic Brunch" (Note: "Chocoholic Brunch" was produced as the eleventh episode of the fifth season, but it aired as the fifth episode of the season.)	February 7, 2015	CCBAB-511H
6	"Breakfast in Bed" (Note: "Breakfast in Bed" was produced as the third episode of the fifth season, but it aired as the sixth episode of the season.)	February 14, 2015	CCBAB-503H
7	"New Diner Favorites" (Note: "New Diner Favorites" was produced as the first episode of the fifth season, but it aired as the seventh episode of the season.)	February 28, 2015	CCBAB-501H
8	"Big Apple Brunch" (Note: "Big Apple Brunch" was produced as the final episode of the fifth season, but it aired as the eighth episode of the season.)	March 7, 2015	CCBAB-513H
9	"Irish Style Brunch" (Note: "Irish Style Brunch" was produced as the seventh episode of the fifth season, but it aired as the ninth episode of the season.)	March 14, 2015	CCBAB-507H
10	"Brunch in Bloom" (Note: "Brunch in Bloom" was produced as the second episode of the fifth season, but it aired as the tenth episode of the season.)	March 21, 2015	CCBAB-502H
11	"Bread Lovers' Brunch" (Note: "Bread Lovers' Brunch" was produced as the sixth episode of the fifth season, but it aired as the eleventh episode of the season.)	September 19, 2015	CCBAB-506H
12	"Retro Revamp Brunch" (Note: "Retro Revamp Brunch" was produced as the ninth episode of the fifth season, but it aired as the twelfth episode of the season.)	September 26, 2015	CCBAB-509H
13	"Weekend Staycation" (Note: "Weekend Staycation" was produced as the tenth episode of the fifth season, but it aired as the final episode of the season.)	October 3, 2015	CCBAB-510H

=== Season 6 (2015–2016) ===
No.	Title	Original air date	Production code
1	"Pancake House Favorites"	November 8, 2015	AS0601H
2	"Thanksgiving Brunch"	November 15, 2015	AS0602H
3	"Entertaining Middle Eastern Style"	November 29, 2015	AS0603H
4	"Holiday Leftover Brunch"	December 6, 2015	AS0604H
5	"Home for the Holidays Brunch"	December 13, 2015	AS0605H
6	"Guilt-Free Brunch"	January 3, 2016	AS0606H
7	"Breaking Bread for Brunch"	January 10, 2016	AS0607H
8	"Money-Saving Showstoppers"	January 17, 2016	AS0608H
9	"Buttermilk Brunch"	January 24, 2016	AS0609H
10	"Big Game Brunch"	January 31, 2016	AS0610H
11	"Cocoa-Licious Brunch" (Note: "Cocoa-Licious Brunch" was produced as the twelfth episode of the sixth season and "The Savory Side of Brunch" was produced as the eleventh episode of the season, but the two episodes aired in opposite order.)	February 14, 2016	AS0612H
12	"The Savory Side of Brunch"	February 21, 2016	AS0611H
13	"Comfort Food Fake-Outs"	February 28, 2016	AS0613H
14	"Beachside Brunch"	May 1, 2016	AS0614H
15	"Ladies Who Brunch"	May 8, 2016	AS0615H
16	"Apples to Apples Brunch"	May 15, 2016	AS0616H
17	"Buzz-Worthy Brunch"	May 29, 2016	AS0617H

=== Season 7 (2016–17) ===
No.	Title	Original air date	Production code
1	"Keeping It Breezy"	August 28, 2016	AS0701H
2	"Barbecue in the Big Apple"	September 4, 2016	AS0702H
3	"Between the Bread"	September 11, 2016	AS0703H
4	"Get Your Fit On"	September 18, 2016	AS0704H
5	"Bobby Loves Biscuits"	September 25, 2016	AS0705H
6	"Time to Pull the Curtain on Crepes"	October 2, 2016	AS0706H
7	"Sophie's Sunday Funday"	October 9, 2016	AS0707H
8	"Updated Manhattan"	October 23, 2016	AS0708H
9	"Wake Up Your Sweet Tooth"	October 30, 2016	AS0709H
10	"Almost Home for Thanksgiving"	November 13, 2016	AS0710H
11	"Preaking Out"	November 27, 2016	AS0711H
12	"It's the Brunch After Christmas"	December 4, 2016	AS0712H
13	"Inspired By Italy"	January 7, 2017	AS0713H
