= List of The Pioneer Woman episodes =

The American cooking-themed television series The Pioneer Woman has aired on Food Network since its inception in 2011. As of April 2026, over 500 episodes have aired through the show's forty seasons.

== Episodes ==
=== Season 1 (2011) ===
No.	Title	Original air date	Production code
1	"Home on the Ranch"	August 27, 2011	WU0101H
2	"Surprise Birthday"	September 3, 2011	WU0102H
3	"Cowgirls and Cowboys"	September 10, 2011	WU0103H
4	"The Drummond Bunch"	September 17, 2011	WU0104H
5	"Frontier Family"	September 24, 2011	WU0105H
6	"Rancher's Dinner"	October 1, 2011	WU0106H
7	"Christmas"	December 17, 2011	WUSP01H

=== Season 2 (2012) ===
No.	Title	Original air date	Production code
1	"Ranching in the Mist"	January 14, 2012	WU0201H
2	"All Stocked Up"	January 21, 2012	WU0202H
3	"The Big Game"	January 28, 2012	WU0203H
4	"Little School House on the Prairie"	February 4, 2012	WU0204H
5	"Chocolate Day"	February 11, 2012	WU0205H
6	"Camping at the Creek"	February 18, 2012	WU0206H
7	"Potluck Sunday"	February 25, 2012	WU0207H
8	"Ladd's Birthday"	March 3, 2012	WU0208H
9	"Kidswap Sleepover"	March 10, 2012	WU0209H
10	"Triple Act"	March 17, 2012	WU0210H
11	"Rise and Shine"	March 24, 2012	WU0211H
12	"Family Matters"	March 31, 2012	WU0212H
13	"PW To Go"	April 7, 2012	WU0213H

=== Season 3 (2012–2013) ===
No.	Title	Original air date	Production code
1	"Burnin' Down the Barn"	August 4, 2012	WU0301H
2	"All Work and Some Play"	August 11, 2012	WU0302H
3	"Paige and Friends"	August 18, 2012	WU0303H
4	"Eating for One"	August 25, 2012	WU0304H
5	"Frontier Fiesta"	September 1, 2012	WU0305H
6	"Girl Time and Burger Time"	September 8, 2012	WU0306H
7	"Horsing Around"	September 15, 2012	WU0307H
8	"Mike's Day Out"	September 22, 2012	WU0308H
9	"Alex's Birthday"	September 29, 2012	WU0309H
10	"B.F.F."	October 6, 2012	WU0310H
11	"For Papa"	October 13, 2012	WU0311H
12	"Make Hay While the Sun Shines"	October 20, 2012	WU0312H
13	"Family Favorites"	October 27, 2012	WU0313H
14	"Fourth of July" (Note: Although "Fourth of July" was produced after the fourth season, it is packaged as part of the third season.)	June 29, 2013	WU0314H

==== Specials ====
No.	Title	Original air date	Production code
—	"Thanksgiving"	November 17, 2012	WU0401H
—	"Christmas is Coming"	December 8, 2012	WU0402H

=== Season 4 (2013) ===
No.	Title	Original air date	Production code
1	"Ranch Games"	January 26, 2013	WU0403H
2	"Sixteen Minute Meals"	February 2, 2013	WU0404H
3	"Ten Things I Love"	February 9, 2013	WU0405H
4	"Cowboy Tailgating"	February 16, 2013	WU0406H
5	"Special Delivery"	February 23, 2013	WU0407H
6	"Beat the Clock"	March 2, 2013	WU0408H
7	"Food and Football"	March 9, 2013	WU0409H
8	"Cowboy Lunch"	March 16, 2013	WU0410H
9	"Sunday Brunch"	March 23, 2013	WU0411H
10	"School Day"	March 30, 2013	WU0412H
11	"Edna Mae's Birthday"	April 6, 2013	WU0413H
12	"The Sleepover Six"	April 13, 2013	WU0414H
13	"Investment Reunion Dinner"	April 20, 2013	WU0415H

=== Season 5 (2013) ===
No.	Title	Original air date	Production code
1	"Old Friends, New Friends"	June 1, 2013	WU0501H
2	"Pickup Picnic"	June 8, 2013	WU0502H
3	"Feeding Cows, Feeding Cowboys"	June 15, 2013	WU0503H
4	"The Building"	June 22, 2013	WU0504H
5	"Five Girls and a Baby"	July 6, 2013	WU0505H
6	"Time Tested"	July 13, 2013	WU0506H
7	"Fill the Freezer"	July 20, 2013	WU0507H
8	"Simply the Best"	July 27, 2013	WU0508H
9	"Breakfast Delivery"	August 3, 2013	WU0509H
10	"Big House Clean Up"	August 10, 2013	WU0510H
11	"Dear Pioneer Woman" (Note: "Alex's 16th Birthday" was produced as the eleventh episode of the fifth season and "Dear Pioneer Woman" was produced as the twelfth episode, but the two episodes aired in opposite order.)	August 17, 2013	WU0512H
12	"Alex's 16th Birthday"	August 24, 2013	WU0511H
13	"Building Pens"	August 31, 2013	WU0513H

=== Season 6 (2013–2014) ===
No.	Title	Original air date	Production code
1	"Cowboy and Cowgirl Lunch"	September 21, 2013	WU0601H
2	"Cutting Down Cedars"	September 28, 2013	WU0602H
3	"Moving Cattle"	October 5, 2013	WU0603H
4	"Make Ahead Marvels"	October 12, 2013	WU0604H
5	"Sweet Deliveries"	October 26, 2013	WU0605H
6	"Tex-Mex for Cowboys"	November 2, 2013	WU0606H
7	"Scrumptious 16-Minute Meals"	November 9, 2013	WU0607H
8	"Turkey Day Leftovers"	November 16, 2013	WU0608H
9	"Dinner for Dad"	November 30, 2013	WU0609H
10	"Christmas Cocktail Party"	December 7, 2013	WU0610H
11	"Bulk Buys"	January 18, 2014	WU0611H
12	"Football Camp"	January 25, 2014	WU0612H
13	"Make Ahead Potluck"	February 1, 2014	WU0613H

=== Season 7 (2014) ===
No.	Title	Original air date	Production code
1	"Us and Them"	February 8, 2014	WU0701H
2	"Shakespeare Movie Night"	February 15, 2014	WU0702H
3	"Lighten Up"	February 22, 2014	WU0703H
4	"Cowboy Mike"	March 1, 2014	WU0704H
5	"16 Minute Meals Around the World"	March 8, 2014	WU0705H
6	"B-Man"	March 15, 2014	WU0706H
7	"Gathering Bulls"	April 5, 2014	WU0707H
8	"Happy Birthday, Pa-Pa"	April 12, 2014	WU0708H
9	"Filling Edna Mae's Freezer"	May 10, 2014	WU0709H
10	"Breakfast, Lunch and Cowboys"	May 17, 2014	WU0710H
11	"Essential Cooking Tools"	May 24, 2014	WU0711H
12	"Spring Burning"	May 31, 2014	WU0712H
13	"Big Day at the Building"	June 7, 2014	WU0713H

=== Season 8 (2014) ===
No.	Title	Original air date	Production code
1	"16-Minute Meals: All Day Long"	October 25, 2014	WU0801H
2	"Takeout at Home"	July 12, 2014	WU0802H
3	"Engagement Dinner"	July 19, 2014	WU0803H
4	"Man Cave"	July 26, 2014	WU0804H
5	"Pet Parade"	August 2, 2014	WU0805H
6	"Kitchen Confessional: Comfort Food"	August 9, 2014	WU0806H
7	"Hitting the Road"	August 16, 2014	WU0807H
8	"Outdoor Cookout, Indoor Grilling"	August 30, 2014	WU0808H
9	"Working Calves at Tim's"	September 6, 2014	WU0809H
10	"16 Minute Meals: Pasta Pronto"	September 13, 2014	WU0810H
11	"One Thing Leads to Another"	September 20, 2014	WU0811H
12	"Sister Time"	September 27, 2014	WU0812H
13	"Fence Work"	October 18, 2014	WU0813H

=== Season 9 (2014–2015) ===
No.	Title	Original air date	Production code
1	"Tasty Treats to Go"	October 25, 2014	WU0801H
2	"Herbalicious"	November 1, 2014	WU0902H
3	"Perfect Pies"	November 8, 2014	WU0903H
4	"The Secrets in the Sides"	November 15, 2014	WU0904H
5	"Office Warming Party"	November 29, 2014	WU0905H
6	"Healthy 16-Minute Meals"	January 3, 2015	WU0907H
7	"Souper Good"	January 10, 2015	WU0908H
8	"Chicken in Bulk"	January 17, 2015	WU0909H
9	"Football, Football, Football"	January 24, 2015	WU0910H
10	"Ladies Who Brunch" (Note: "Ladies Who Brunch" was produced as the sixth episode of the ninth season, but it aired as the tenth episode of the season.)	January 31, 2015	WU0906H
11	"Kitchen Confessional: Chocolate"	February 7, 2015	WU0912H
12	"Shipping Cattle"	February 14, 2015	WU0913H
13	"Stacking the Hay and Stocking the Freezer" (Note: "Stacking the Hay and Stocking the Freezer" was produced as the eleventh episode of the ninth season, but it aired as the final episode of the season.)	February 21, 2015	WU0911H

=== Season 10 (2015) ===
No.	Title	Original air date	Production code
1	"Speedy Sweets"	March 21, 2015	WU1001H
2	"Easter Weekend"	March 28, 2015	WU1002H
3	"Freezer Fundamentals"	April 4, 2015	WU1003H
4	"Kitchen Confessional: Dinner Through the Decades"	April 18, 2015	WU1004H
5	"Breakfast for Dinner"	April 25, 2015	WU1005H
6	"Friendship Fiesta"	May 2, 2015	WU1006H
7	"Just Me and the Girls"	May 9, 2015	WU1007H
8	"Happy Birthday, Ladd"	May 23, 2015	WU1008H
9	"The Middles"	May 30, 2015	WU1009H
10	"Perfecting the Pantry"	June 13, 2015	WU1010H
11	"Chuck and Crew"	June 20, 2015	WU1011H
12	"Cooking, Feeding, and Eating"	June 27, 2015	WU1012H
13	"Color, Color, Color"	July 19, 2015	WU1013H

=== Season 11 (2015) ===
No.	Title	Original air date	Production code
1	"Stanton and Paige"	August 1, 2015	WU1101H
2	"Graduation Party"	August 8, 2015	WU1102H
3	"Fired Up"	August 15, 2015	WU1103H
4	"Packaged With Love"	August 22, 2015	WU1104H
5	"Surprise!"	September 5, 2015	WU1105H
6	"Perfect Picnic"	September 12, 2015	WU1106H
7	"16-Minute Meals: Cowboy Style"	September 19, 2015	WU1107H
8	"Kitchen Confessional: The Other Men in My Life" (Note: "Alone Again" was produced as the eighth episode of the eleventh season and "Kitchen Confessional: The Other Men in My Life" was produced as the twelfth episode, but the two episodes aired in opposite order.)	September 26, 2015	WU1112H
9	"Shipping Season"	October 10, 2015	WU1109H
10	"First Time for Everything"	October 17, 2015	WU1110H
11	"Alex's Care Pack"	October 24, 2015	WU1111H
12	"Alone Again"	October 31, 2015	WU1108H
13	"Cousins Campout"	November 14, 2015	WU1113H

=== Season 12 (2015–2016) ===
No.	Title	Original air date	Production code
1	"Dorm Room Dining" (Note: "Dorm Room Dining" originally aired during the eleventh season, but it is packaged as part of the twelfth season.)	November 7, 2015	WU1201H
2	"Party in the Fridge"	November 28, 2015	WU1202H
3	"Christmas Goodies"	December 5, 2015	WU1203H
4	"Anniversary"	December 12, 2015	WU1204H
5	"Meatless Marvels"	January 2, 2016	WU1205H
6	"Hay Day"	January 9, 2016	WU1206H
7	"Simple Meals"	January 16, 2016	WU1207H
8	"For Pete's Sake"	January 23, 2016	WU1208H
9	"Double Game Day"	January 30, 2016	WU1209H
10	"Special Day" (Note: "Kitchen Confessional: Four Seasons on the Ranch" was produced as the tenth episode of the twelfth season and "Special Day" was produced as the twelfth episode, but the two episodes aired in opposite order.)	February 6, 2016	WU1212H
11	"Four Shades of Chocolate"	February 13, 2016	WU1211H
12	"Kitchen Confessional: Four Seasons on the Ranch"	February 27, 2016	WU1210H
13	"Feeding 101"	March 12, 2016	WU1213H

=== Season 13 (2016) ===
No.	Title	Original air date	Production code
1	"Oh, Baby"	March 19, 2016	WU1301H
2	"A Tale of Four Lunches"	April 9, 2016	WU1302H
3	"FAQ"	April 16, 2016	WU1303H
4	"Market Meet-Up"	April 23, 2016	WU1304H
5	"Tequila"	April 30, 2016	WU1305H
6	"Mom's Day"	May 7, 2016	WU1306H
7	"Kit and Caboodle"	May 21, 2016	WU1307H
8	"Burning 101"	May 28, 2016	WU1308H
9	"Deli Food Showdown"	June 4, 2016	WU1309H
10	"Fixin' Fence, Fixin' Lunch"	June 11, 2016	WU1310H
11	"Well Done, Dad"	June 18, 2016	WU1311H
12	"16-Minute Meals: Summer"	July 2, 2016	WU1312H
13	"Chicken, Chicken, Chicken"	July 9, 2016	WU1313H

=== Season 14 (2016) ===
No.	Title	Original air date	Production code
1	"Afternoon Tea"	July 16, 2016	WU1401H
2	"Boxing Boys"	August 6, 2016	WU1402H
3	"Merc Deliveries"	August 13, 2016	WU1403H
4	"Night on the Town"	August 20, 2016	WU1404H
5	"Low Carb Lusciousness"	August 27, 2016	WU1405H
6	"Birthday Bash"	September 3, 2016	WU1406H
7	"The Couple That Cooks Together"	September 17, 2016	WU1407H
8	"Mash Up Mania"	October 8, 2016	WU1408H
9	"Deli Deliberation"	October 15, 2016	WU1409H
10	"FAQ Freezer"	October 22, 2016	WU1410H
11	"Crazy-Sweet Treats"	October 29, 2016	WU1411H
12	"Good Ol' Days"	November 5, 2016	WU1412H
13	"Frontier Friendsgiving"	November 12, 2016	WU1413H

=== Season 15 (2016–2017) ===
No.	Title	Original air date	Production code
1	"The Eleventh Hour"	November 26, 2016	WU1501H
2	"Christmas Unwrapped"	December 3, 2016	WU1502H
3	"Never Enough Puff"	December 10, 2016	WU1503H
4	"Lighter 16-Minute Meals"	January 7, 2017	—
5	"B-Man and Me"	January 14, 2017	—
6	"Other Cuts of Beef"	January 21, 2017	—
7	"Truly Madly Crazy"	January 28, 2017	—
8	"Merc Story"	February 4, 2017	—
9	"Sharing Chocolate"	February 11, 2017	—
10	"Kit for Cowboy Cameron"	February 18, 2017	—
11	"Old-Fashioned Comfort"	February 25, 2017	—
12	"Lunches to Go"	March 4, 2017	—
13	"Dinner's All Done"	March 11, 2017	—

=== Season 16 (2017) ===
No.	Title	Original air date	Production code
1	"All in One"	April 15, 2017	—
2	"All in a Morning's Work"	April 22, 2017	—
3	"Just for Kicks"	April 29, 2017	—
4	"16 Minute Dinners"	May 6, 2017	—
5	"Drummond Kids at the Merc"	May 13, 2017	—
6	"Breakfast Hacks"	May 20, 2017	—
7	"Cleaning Out the Fridge"	May 27, 2017	—
8	"Elevate This"	June 3, 2017	—
9	"Competing Breakfasts"	June 10, 2017	—
10	"The Way Things Used to Be"	June 17, 2017	—
11	"Ranch-Style Tex Mex"	June 24, 2017	—
12	"Summer Summer Summer"	July 1, 2017	—
