= List of Firing Line episodes (1966–1969) =

Firing Line is an American public affairs show founded and hosted by conservative William F. Buckley Jr.

This is a list of episodes that aired originally from 1966 to 1969.

== Episodes ==
=== Season 1 (1966) ===
No. overall	No. in season	Title	Guest	Taping date
1	1	"Poverty: Hopeful or Hopeless?"	Michael Harrington	April 4, 1966
2	2	"Prayer in the Public Schools"	James Pike	April 6, 1966
3	3	"Vietnam: Pull Out? Stay In? Escalate?"	Norman Thomas	April 8, 1966
4	4	"Capital Punishment"	Steve Allen	April 11, 1966
5	5	"Where Does the Civil-Rights Movement Go Now?"	James Farmer	April 18, 1966
6	6	"Should the House Committee on Un-American Activities Be Abolished?"	John Henry Faulk	April 21, 1966
7	7	"The Prevailing Bias"	David Susskind	May 2, 1966
8	8	"The New Frontier: The Great Society"	Richard N. Goodwin	May 6, 1966
9	9	"Civil Disobedience: How Far Can It Go?"	Dick Gregory	May 16, 1966
10	10	"McCarthyism: Past, Present, Future"	Leo Cherne	May 16, 1966
11	11	"Vietnam: What Next?"	Staughton Lynd	May 23, 1966
12	12	"The Future of States' Rights"	Harry Golden	May 23, 1966
13	13	"The Future of the Republican Party"	Clare Boothe Luce	May 26, 1966
14	14	"The Future of the American Theater"	David Merrick	June 6, 1966
15	15	"Bobby Kennedy and Other Mixed Blessings"	Murray Kempton	June 6, 1966
16	16	"The Future of Conservatism"	Barry Goldwater	June 9, 1966
17	17	"Public Power vs. Private Power"	Albert Gore Sr.	June 9, 1966
18	18	"Communists and Civil Liberties"	Joseph L. Rauh Jr.	June 10, 1966
19	19	"The Role of the Church Militant"	William Sloane Coffin	June 27, 1966
20	20	"Why Are the Students Unhappy?"	Theodore Bikel	June 27, 1966
21	21	"Senator Dodd and General Klein"	Thomas J. Dodd	August 22, 1966
22	22	"Extremism"	Dore Schary	August 22, 1966
23	23	"Civil Rights and Foreign Policy"	Floyd McKissick	August 22, 1966
24	24	"The President and the Press"	Pierre Salinger	September 12, 1966
25	25	"Are Public Schools Necessary?"	Paul Goodman	September 12, 1966
26	26	"The Playboy Philosophy"	Hugh Hefner	September 12, 1966
27	27	"Do Liberals Make Good Republicans?"	John Chafee	September 15, 1966
28	28	"Should Labor Power Be Reduced?"	Victor Riesel	September 19, 1966
29	29	"Communist China and the United Nations"	Max Lerner	September 19, 1966
30	30	"National Priorities and Disarmament"	Seymour Melman	October 3, 1966
31	31	"LBJ and Evans and Novak"	Rowland Evans	October 3, 1966
32	32	"Civilian Review Board: Yes or No?"	Theodore W. Kheel	October 7, 1966
33	33	"Criminals and the Supreme Court"	Aryeh Neier	November 7, 1966
34	34	"Open Housing"	John A. Morsell	November 7, 1966
35	35	"The Failure of Organized Religion"	Paul Weiss	November 14, 1966
36	36	"What to Do with the American Teenager?"	Murray the K	November 14, 1966
37	37	"Elections 1966 and 1968"	Robert Novak	November 21, 1966
38	38	"Sports, Persecution, and Christians"	Arnold Lunn	November 28, 1966
39	39	"The Warren Report: Fact or Fiction?"	Mark Lane	December 1, 1966

=== Season 2 (1967) ===
No. overall	No. in season	Title	Guest(s)	Taping date
40	1	"Rhodesia, the UN, and Southern Africa"	Conor Cruise O'Brien	January 12, 1967
41	2	"LBJ and the Intellectuals"	Hans Morgenthau	January 12, 1967
42	3	"Academic Freedom and Berkeley"	Harold Taylor	January 16, 1967
43	4	"Presidential Politics"	F. Clifton White	January 16, 1967
44	5	"The Role of the Advocate"	F. Lee Bailey	January 19, 1967
45	6	"The Future of the UN"	Francis T. P. Plimpton	January 19, 1967
46	7	"Do the States Have a Chance?"	Jesse M. Unruh	March 6, 1967
47	8	"LBJ and Vietnam"	Vance Hartke; C. Dickerman Williams	March 6, 1967
48	9	"Politics and the Press"	Tom Wicker	March 7, 1967
49	10	"Black Power"	Nat Hentoff	March 7, 1967
50	11	"Is There a Role for a Third Party?"	Franklin Delano Roosevelt Jr.	March 8, 1967
51	12	"U.S. Policy in Southeast Asia"	Clayton Fritchey	March 8, 1967
52	13	"Do We Have Anything Left to Fear from Socialism?"	Sidney Hook	March 9, 1967
53	14	"The World of LSD"	Timothy Leary	April 10, 1967
54	15	"Censorship and the Production Code"	Otto Preminger	April 10, 1967
55	16	"The Regular in Politics"	Carmine DeSapio	May 1, 1967
56	17	"How to Protest"	Dwight Macdonald	May 1, 1967
57	18	"The Liberals and LBJ"	John P. Roche	May 15, 1967
58	19	"The Poverty Problem"	Joseph S. Clark Jr.	May 15, 1967
59	20	"Is Ramparts Magazine Un-American?"	Robert Scheer	June 26, 1967
60	21	"Vietnam Protests"	Benjamin Spock	June 26, 1967
61	22	"The Mideast Crisis"	Alfred Lilienthal	June 29, 1967
62	23	"The Decline of Anti-Communism [1967]"	Fred Schwarz	June 29, 1967
63	24	"Is It Possible to Be a Good Governor? [1967]"	Ronald Reagan	July 6, 1967
64	25	"Is the World Funny?"	Groucho Marx	July 7, 1967
65	26	"Vietnam"	Robert Vaughn	July 8, 1967
66	27	"The Ghetto"	Kenneth B. Clark	August 28, 1967
67	28	"Municipal Government"	Sam Yorty	August 28, 1967
68	29	"A Foreign Policy for the GOP"	Charles H. Percy	September 11, 1967
69	30	"The Future of the GOP"	Richard Nixon	September 14, 1967
70	31	"Vietnam and the GOP"	Thruston Ballard Morton	September 25, 1967
71	32	"Medicare"	Wilbur J. Cohen	September 25, 1967
72	33	"Is There a New God?"	John Robinson	October 6, 1967
73	34	"The English Conservatives"	Peregrine Worsthorne	October 6, 1967
74	35	"The Union in Modern Society"	Clive Jenkins	October 7, 1967
75	36	"Is Socialism the Answer?"	Michael Foot	October 7, 1967
76	37	"War Crimes"	Ralph Schoenman	November 13, 1967
77	38	"The Struggle for Democracy in Brazil"	Carlos Lacerda	November 13, 1967
78	39	"Do We Need Public Schools?"	Ernest van den Haag	December 11, 1967
79	40	"Mobilizing the Poor"	Saul Alinsky	December 11, 1967
80	41	"Is There a Need for Intelligence?"	Allen Dulles	December 14, 1967
81	42	"Was Goldwater a Mistake?"	Mark Hatfield	December 14, 1967

=== Season 3 (1968) ===
No. overall	No. in season	Title	Guest(s)	Taping date
82	1	"The John Birch Society"	Slobodan M. Draskovich	January 8, 1968
83	2	"The Economic Crisis"	Milton Friedman	January 8, 1968
84	3	"Was the Civil-Rights Crusade a Mistake?"	Godfrey Cambridge	January 15, 1968
85	4	"Student Power"	Robert Theobald	January 15, 1968
86	5	"The Ghost of the Army-McCarthy Hearings: Part I"	James D. St. Clair; Roy Cohn; Leo Cherne; Emile de Antonio	January 19, 1968
87	6	"The Ghost of the Army-McCarthy Hearings: Part II"	James D. St. Clair; Roy Cohn; Leo Cherne; Emile de Antonio	January 19, 1968
88	7	"The Wallace Crusade"	George Wallace	January 24, 1968
89	8	"Wiretapping--Electronic Bugging"	Edward V. Long	January 24, 1968
90	9	"Philby and Treason"	Rebecca West	February 26, 1968
91	10	"The Culture of the Left"	Malcolm Muggeridge	February 26, 1968
92	11	"The Anti-Communist Left"	Melvin J. Lasky	February 27, 1968
93	12	"English Youth and Vietnam"	Ian Martin; Hilary Sears; Gerry Johnson; Bob Mathews	February 27, 1968
94	13	"Robert F. Kennedy"	Hodding Carter	April 15, 1968
95	14	"The Wallace Movement"	Leander Perez	April 15, 1968
96	15	"The New Left"	David Dellinger	April 25, 1968
97	16	"The Middle East [1968]"	Freda Utley	April 25, 1968
98	17	"Can We Win in Vietnam?"	Herman Kahn	May 7, 1968
99	18	"The Avant Garde"	Allen Ginsberg	May 7, 1968
100	19	"Governing the Cities"	Carl Stokes	May 24, 1968
101	20	"The Republicans and the Cities"	Seth Taft	May 24, 1968
102	21	"Armies of the Night"	Norman Mailer	May 28, 1968
103	22	"Journals of News and Opinion"	Otto Fuerbringer	May 28, 1968
104	23	"Unrest on the Campus"	Allan Boles; Roger Rapoport; Joel Kramer	June 20, 1968
105	24	"Violence"	Fredric Wertham	June 20, 1968
106	25	"The Rib Uncaged: Women and the Church"	Rosemary Radford Ruether; Mary Daly; Sidney Cornelia Callahan	June 24, 1968
107	26	"Obscenity and the Supreme Court"	Charles Rembar; Richard Kuh	June 24, 1968
108	27	"Has the Republican Party Anything to Offer?"	Gerald Ford	July 8, 1968
109	28	"The Washington Press"	Marianne Means; David Kraslow; David S. Broder	July 8, 1968
110	29	"Liberalism and the Intellectuals"	Marya Mannes	July 10, 1968
111	30	"The Socialist Workers' Party and American Politics"	Fred Halstead; Paul Boutelle	July 10, 1968
112	31	"Capital Punishment"	Truman Capote	September 3, 1968
113	32	"The Hippies"	Lewis Yablonsky; Ed Sanders; Jack Kerouac	September 3, 1968
114	33	"Money Troubles"	Joseph W. Barr; Arthur Edward Burns	September 9, 1968
115	34	"The McCarthy Phenomenon"	Allard K. Lowenstein	September 9, 1968
116	35	"The Cold War"	Zbigniew Brzezinski	September 23, 1968
117	36	"Some Problems of the Freshman Senator"	Charles Goodell	September 23, 1968
118	37	"Korean War Defectors"	Morris Wills; Richard Tenneson; Virginia Pasley	October 7, 1968
119	38	"Politics and Show Biz"	Orson Bean	October 7, 1968
120	39	"Why Do So Many Canadians Hate America?"	Larry Zolf; Dennis Lee; Al Purdy	October 21, 1968
121	40	"Is South Africa Everybody's Business?"	Stephanus Steyn; George Houser	November 4, 1968
122	41	"The Influence of TV on American Politics"	Alistair Cooke; Robert MacNeil; F. Clifton White	November 4, 1968
123	42	"Cracking the Cities' Problem"	Joseph Alioto	November 13, 1968
124	43	"The Black Panthers"	Eldridge Cleaver	November 13, 1968
125	44	"Jerusalem and the Middle East"	Teddy Kollek	November 18, 1968
126	45	"The Republic of New Africa"	Milton Henry	November 18, 1968
127	46	"Does Science Emerge Supreme?"	Christiaan Barnard	December 9, 1968
128	47	"The American Challenge"	Jean-Jacques Servan-Schreiber; Evan G. Galbraith	December 9, 1968
129	48	"The Uses of Animals"	Barnaby Conrad; Cleveland Amory	December 12, 1968
130	49	"Muhammad Ali and the Negro Movement"	Muhammad Ali	December 12, 1968

=== Season 4 (1969) ===
No. overall	No. in season	Title	Guest(s)	Taping date
131	1	"The Issues in the School Strike"	Albert Shanker	January 6, 1969
132	2	"The Plight of the American Novelist"	Helen MacInnes; Louis Auchincloss	January 6, 1969
133	3	"The Walker Report"	Sidney Zion; Donald Rumsfeld	January 13, 1969
134	4	"The Tragedy of Lyndon Johnson"	Eric F. Goldman	January 13, 1969
135	5	"How Goes It with the Poverty Program?"	Bernard Shiffman; Major Owens	January 27, 1969
136	6	"The Unfinished Odyssey of Robert Kennedy"	David Halberstam; Ralph de Toledano	January 27, 1969
137	7	"The Ripon Society"	Tom Petri; Josiah Lee Auspitz	February 24, 1969
138	8	"The Fifth Amendment"	Harold J. Rothwax; C. Dickerman Williams	February 24, 1969
139	9	"Black Anti-Semitism"	Milton A. Galamison; Nathan Perlmutter	February 25, 1969
140	10	"Restructuring the University"	Allen Grossman; Alfred H. Conrad; Jeffrey Hart	February 25, 1969
141	11	"Police Power"	John J. Heffernan; Paul G. Chevigny	February 26, 1969
142	12	"Black Student Power"	John Felder; David Swedan; John R. Coyne	February 26, 1969
143	13	"Vietnam and the Intellectuals"	Noam Chomsky	April 3, 1969
144	14	"Urban Development and the Race Question"	Roy Innis	April 3, 1969
145	15	"Modernism in the Catholic Church"	Maisie Ward; Frank Sheed	April 21, 1969
146	16	"The Campus Destroyers"	Al Capp	April 21, 1969
147	17	"The ABM Conflict"	Albert Gore Sr.; James Burnham	April 28, 1969
148	18	"Problems of a Chief Executive"	Ray Price; Pat Buchanan	April 28, 1969
149	19	"Cornell and the Conflict of Generations"	Walter Berns; Ernest van den Haag	May 19, 1969
150	20	"The Trouble with Enoch"	Enoch Powell	May 19, 1969
151	21	"ABM"	Hans Bethe; Donald G. Brennan	June 2, 1969
152	22	"Afro-American Studies"	C. Eric Lincoln; David Brudnoy	June 2, 1969
153	23	"The Decline of Christianity"	Billy Graham	June 12, 1969
154	24	"Labor Unions and American Freedom"	James B. Carey	June 12, 1969
155	25	"Violence in America"	Hugh Davis Graham; Ted Robert Gurr	June 23, 1969
156	26	"The Population Explosion"	Colin Clark; Alan Sweezy	June 23, 1969
157	27	"Marijuana--How Harmful?"	Robert Baird; David E. Smith	July 7, 1969
158	28	"The Conservative Party and the Future of the GOP"	J. Daniel Mahoney	July 7, 1969
159	29	"The Irish Problem"	Denis Donoghue; Terence O'Neill	July 22, 1969
160	30	"The Decline of Anti-Communism [1969]"	Constantine Fitzgibbon	July 22, 1969
161	31	"Monarchy and the Modern World"	Otto von Habsburg	July 23, 1969
162	32	"The UN and World Affairs"	Hugh Foot, Baron Caradon	July 23, 1969
163	33	"Is There a Place for the Old Order?"	Brigid Brophy; John Hanbury Angus Sparrow	July 24, 1969
164	34	"American Popularity Abroad"	Anthony Lewis	July 24, 1969
165	35	"Post Office Reform"	Winton M. Blount	September 9, 1969
166	36	"Where Should the Nixon Administration Go?"	Barry Goldwater	September 9, 1969
167	37	"Biafra and English Foreign Policy"	Auberon Waugh	September 22, 1969
168	38	"Looking Back on de Gaulle"	Jacques Soustelle	September 22, 1969
169	39	"The Making of the President 1968"	Theodore H. White	September 22, 1969
170	40	"The Welfare-Reform Proposal"	Daniel Patrick Moynihan	October 7, 1969
171	41	"Race and Conservatism"	John E. Moss; John Conyers; Ed Koch	October 7, 1969
172	42	"Conservative vs. Progressive Republicanism"	Jacob K. Javits	October 24, 1969
173	43	"Abortion"	Frank Ayd; Alan Frank Guttmacher	October 24, 1969
174	44	"What Have We Learned from Socialism?"	Gunnar Myrdal	November 4, 1969
175	45	"Salvation, Rock Music, and the New Iconoclasm"	C. C. Courtney; Peter Link	November 4, 1969
176	46	"The Selling of the President 1968"	Joe McGinniss	November 10, 1969
177	47	"Negotiating for Peace"	Eugene V. Rostow; J. Robert Moskin	November 10, 1969
178	48	"Vietnam"	Harlan Cleveland	December 6, 1969
179	49	"Reflections on the Current Scene"	Clare Boothe Luce	December 6, 1969
180	50	"The Future of the Democratic Party"	Pat Brown	December 9, 1969
181	51	"Why Don't Conservatives Understand?"	Roger Rapoport; Harvey H. Hukari; Wes Nisker	December 9, 1969
182	52	"Tariffs"	Henry Wallich; O. R. Strackbein	December 18, 1969
183	53	"The Kennedy Years"	John Kenneth Galbraith	December 18, 1969
