= List of In Concert episodes =

The following is a list of episodes from the American television series In Concert.

== Series overview ==
Season	Episodes	Originally aired	
Season	Episodes	Premiere	Finale
1	15	November 24, 1972	August 17, 1973
2	26	September 14, 1973	August 30, 1974
3	16	September 13, 1974	April 25, 1975

== Season 1 (1972–1973) ==
Episode	Guests	Original airdate
1	Alice Cooper, Curtis Mayfield, Seals & Crofts, Bo Diddley	November 24, 1972
2	The Allman Brothers Band, Chuck Berry, Blood, Sweat & Tears, Poco	December 8, 1972
3	Grand Funk Railroad, Freddie King, Blackgrass	January 19, 1973
4	Edgar Winter, The Doobie Brothers, Jim Croce, War	February 2, 1973
5	Loggins & Messina, Billy Preston, The Hollies	February 16, 1973
6	B.B. King, Melanie, The Guess Who	March 2, 1973
7	Stephen Stills & Manassas, Randy Newman, Brewer & Shipley	March 16, 1973
8	Al Green, Taj Mahal, Eric Weissberg, Mahavishnu Orchestra, Dr. Hook & the Medicine Show, Muledeer & Moondog	March 30, 1973
9	Bee Gees, Focus, J. Geils Band, Steely Dan	April 13, 1973
10	Gladys Knight & the Pips, Hot Tuna, Jerry Lee Lewis, New Riders of the Purple Sage	May 11, 1973
11	Albert King, Dr. John, Miles Davis, Dan Hicks & the Hot Licks, Slade	May 25, 1973
12	Johnny Nash, T. Rex, John Kay, The Grass Roots, Beck, Bogert & Appice	June 8, 1973
13	Deep Purple, Rare Earth, Buddy Miles, Rory Gallagher	July 6, 1973
14	Mandrill, Eagles, Ike & Tina Turner, Jim Croce, Triumvirat	August 3, 1973
15	Black Oak Arkansas, John Sebastian, Electric Light Orchestra, Nitty Gritty Dirt Band	August 17, 1973

== Season 2 (1973–1974) ==
Episode	Guests	Original airdate
1	Gladys Knight & the Pips, Sha Na Na, Earth, Wind & Fire, Manu Dibango	September 14, 1973
2	Uriah Heep, Canned Heat, Shawn Phillips, Mott the Hoople, Country Joe McDonald	September 28, 1973
3	Bobby Womack, Blood, Sweat & Tears, The Persuasions, Savoy Brown, Roy Buchanan	October 12, 1973
4	Chubby Checker, The Coasters, Jackie Wilson, Bobby Rydell, Dion, The Crystals	October 26, 1973
5	Cat Stevens, Dr. John, Linda Ronstadt	November 9, 1973
6	Sly & The Family Stone, B.B. King, Johnny Winter, The Lockers	November 23, 1973
7	Joe Walsh, Cheech & Chong, Tower of Power, Bonnie Bramlett, Stories	December 7, 1973
8	Chuck Berry, Robert W. Morgan, Ike & Tina Turner, The Staple Singers, Bobby Blue Bland	December 14, 1973
9	Seals & Crofts, Jesse Colin Young, Eddie Kendricks, Walter Heath	January 4, 1973
10	Jerry Lee Lewis, Del Shannon, Little Anthony & the Imperials	January 18, 1974
11	Billy Preston, Steve Miller, Todd Rundgren, James Cotton Blues Band	February 1, 1974
12	Barry White, Love Unlimited, Al Wilson, Maureen McGovern	February 15, 1974
13	James Brown, Commander Cody, Jackson Browne, Linda Ronstadt, Peter Yarrow	March 1, 1974
14	Three Dog Night, Four Tops, Bobby Sandler, Iris	March 15, 1974
15	KISS, Foghat, Melissa Manchester, Redbone, Kool & the Gang	March 29, 1974
16	Chuck Berry, Johnny Rivers, Bo Diddley, Ingrid Gibson, Spoon River Band	April 12, 1974
17	Bachmann-Turner Overdrive, Brownsville Station, Loggins & Messina, The Pointer Sisters	April 26, 1974
18	California Jam: Deep Purple, Emerson, Lake & Palmer, Black Sabbath, Seals & Crofts, Black Oak Arkansas, Eagles, Rare Earth	May 10, 1974
19	California Jam: Deep Purple, Black Sabbath, Rare Earth	May 24, 1974
20	California Jam: Emerson, Lake & Palmer, Black Oak Arkansas	June 7, 1974
21	California Jam: Eagles, Earth, Wind & Fire, Seals & Crofts	June 21, 1974
22	Procol Harum, Jim Stafford, Foghat, The Sensational Alex Harvey Band	July 5, 1974
23	Rod Stewart & the Faces, Maggie Bell, Electric Light Orchestra, Locomotiv GT	July 19, 1974
24	America, Leo Sayer, Focus, Graham Central Station	August 2, 1974
25	Humble Pie, The Kinks, Roxy Music, Blue Swede	August 16, 1974
26	The O'Jays, Flash Cadillac & the Continental Kids, The Hues Corporation, Chris Jagger Band	August 30, 1974

== Season 3 (1974–1975) ==
Episode	Guests	Original airdate
1	Bad Company, Rufus, Blue Magic, PFM	September 13, 1974
2	Anne Murray, Suzi Quatro, The Spinners, Ohio Players	October 11, 1974
3	David Bowie film Ziggy Stardust & the Spiders from Mars	October 25, 1974
4	"In Concert Second Anniversary Special" hosted by Keith Moon. New and old performances by James Brown, Loggins & Messina, Humble Pie, Bad Company, America, Bachman-Turner Overdrive, The Allman Brothers, Three Dog Night, Seals & Crofts, Chuck Berry, Rod Stewart, Sparks, The Spinners, Edgar Winter, Eagles, Jim Croce, Elvin Bishop	November 8, 1974
5	Rick Wakeman	November 22, 1974
6	Sly & the Family Stone, Rush, Minnie Ripperton, Donovan	December 6, 1974
7	James Brown, Linda Ronstadt, Dan Fogelberg	December 20, 1974
8	Souther Hillman Furay Band, Gentle Giant, Climax Blues Band, The Isley Brothers	January 3, 1975
9	Earth, Wind & Fire, Kool & the Gang, Triumvirate, Bobby Vinton	January 17, 1975
10	Fleetwood Mac, Wet Willie, Al Wilson, Formula IV	January 31, 1975
11	Frankie Valli & the Four Seasons, Four Tops, Jay & the Americans, Martha Reeves	February 14, 1975
12	Kris Kristoferson, Ray Stevens, Rita Coolidge, Billy Swan, Charlie Daniels Band	February 28, 1975
13	Roy Clark, Tanya Tucker, Diana Trask, Mel Tillis, Freddy Weller, Johnny Rodriguez, Minnie Pearl	March 14, 1975
14	Tammy Wynette, Conway Twitty, Hank Williams Jr	March 28, 1975
15	Charlie Pride, Gary Stewart, Jerry Reed, Ronnie Milsap, Chet Atkins, Dolly Parton	April 11, 1975
16	Alice Cooper presents Welcome To My Nightmare	April 25, 1975
