= List of Top Chef episodes =

Top Chef is an American reality competition television series which premiered in March 2006 on Bravo. The show features chefs competing against each other in various culinary challenges. They are judged by a panel of professional chefs and other notables from the food and wine industry with one or more contestants eliminated in each episode. Since its inception, the series has aired over 300 episodes.

== Series overview ==
Season	Episodes	Originally released		Location
Season	Episodes	First released	Last released	Location
1	12	March 8, 2006	May 24, 2006	San Francisco
2	13	October 18, 2006	January 31, 2007	Los Angeles
3	17	June 13, 2007	October 10, 2007	Miami
4	16	March 12, 2008	June 18, 2008	Chicago
5	15	November 12, 2008	March 4, 2009	New York City
6	16	August 19, 2009	December 16, 2009	Las Vegas
7	15	June 16, 2010	September 22, 2010	Washington, D.C.
8	17	December 1, 2010	April 6, 2011	New York City
9	18	November 2, 2011	March 7, 2012	Texas
10	17	November 7, 2012	February 27, 2013	Seattle
11	17	October 2, 2013	February 5, 2014	New Orleans
12	15	October 15, 2014	February 11, 2015	Boston
13	15	December 2, 2015	March 17, 2016	California
14	14	December 1, 2016	March 2, 2017	Charleston
15	14	December 7, 2017	March 8, 2018	Colorado
16	15	December 6, 2018	March 14, 2019	Kentucky
17	14	March 19, 2020	June 18, 2020	Los Angeles
18	14	April 1, 2021	July 1, 2021	Portland
19	14	March 3, 2022	June 2, 2022	Houston
20	14	March 9, 2023	June 8, 2023	London
21	14	March 20, 2024	June 19, 2024	Wisconsin
22	14	March 13, 2025	June 12, 2025	Canada
23	14	March 9, 2026	June 8, 2026	Carolinas

== Episodes ==
=== San Francisco (season 1) ===
No. overall	No. in season	Title	Original release date
1	1	"Who Deserves to Be Here?"	March 8, 2006
2	2	"Food of Love"	March 15, 2006
3	3	"Nasty Delights"	March 22, 2006
4	4	"Food on the Fly"	March 29, 2006
5	5	"Blind Confusion"	April 5, 2006
6	6	"Guess Who's Coming to Dinner"	April 12, 2006
7	7	"Restaurant Wars"	April 19, 2006
8	8	"Wedding Bell Blues"	April 26, 2006
9	9	"Napa's Finest"	May 3, 2006
10	10	"Reunion"	May 10, 2006
11	11	"Vegas Finale - Part 1"	May 17, 2006
12	12	"Vegas Finale - Part 2"	May 24, 2006

=== Los Angeles (season 2) ===
No. overall	No. in season	Title	Original release date
13	1	"Into the Fire"	October 18, 2006
14	2	"Eastern Promise"	October 25, 2006
15	3	"Food for the People"	November 1, 2006
16	4	"Less is More"	November 8, 2006
17	5	"Social Service"	November 15, 2006
18	6	"Thanksgiving"	November 22, 2006
19	7	"The Raw and the Cooked"	December 6, 2006
20	8	"Holiday Spirit"	December 13, 2006
21	9	"Seven"	January 3, 2007
22	10	"Unhappy Customers"	January 10, 2007
23	11	"Sense and Sensuality"	January 17, 2007
24	12	"Hawaii Finale, Part 1"	January 24, 2007
25	13	"Hawaii Finale, Part 2"	January 31, 2007

=== Miami (season 3) ===
No. overall	No. in season	Title	Original release date
26	0	"4-Star All-Stars"	June 6, 2007
27	1	"First Impressions"	June 13, 2007
28	2	"Sunny Delights"	June 20, 2007
29	3	"Family Favorites"	June 27, 2007
30	4	"Cooking By Numbers"	July 11, 2007
31	5	"Latin Lunch"	July 18, 2007
32	6	"Watch What Happens Special"	July 25, 2007
33	7	"Freezer Burn"	August 1, 2007
34	8	"Guilty Pleasures"	August 8, 2007
35	9	"Restaurant Wars"	August 15, 2007
36	10	"Second Helping"	August 22, 2007
37	11	"Chef Overboard"	September 5, 2007
38	12	"Snacks on a Plane"	September 12, 2007
39	13	"Manhattan Project"	September 19, 2007
40	14	"Finale, Part 1"	September 26, 2007
41	15	"Finale, Part 2"	October 3, 2007
42	16	"Reunion"	October 10, 2007

=== Chicago (season 4) ===
No. overall	No. in season	Title	Original release date
43	0	"Top Chef Holiday Special"	December 6, 2007
44	1	"Anything You Can Cook, I Can Cook Better"	March 12, 2008
45	2	"Zoo Food"	March 19, 2008
46	3	"Block Party"	March 26, 2008
47	4	"Film Food"	April 2, 2008
48	5	"The Elements"	April 9, 2008
49	6	"Tailgating"	April 16, 2008
50	7	"Improv"	April 23, 2008
51	8	"Common Threads"	April 30, 2008
52	9	"Wedding Wars"	May 7, 2008
53	10	"Serve and Protect"	May 14, 2008
54	11	"Restaurant Wars"	May 21, 2008
55	12	"High Steaks"	May 28, 2008
56	13	"Puerto Rico"	June 4, 2008
57	14	"Finale"	June 11, 2008
58	15	"Reunion"	June 18, 2008

=== New York (season 5) ===
No. overall	No. in season	Title	Original release date
59	1	"Melting Pot"	November 12, 2008
60	2	"Show Your Craft"	November 19, 2008
61	3	"A Foo Fighters Thanksgiving"	November 26, 2008
62	4	"Today Show"	December 3, 2008
63	5	"Gail's Bridal Shower"	December 10, 2008
64	6	"12 Days of Christmas"	December 17, 2008
65	7	"Focus Group"	January 7, 2009
66	8	"Down on the Farm"	January 14, 2009
67	9	"Restaurant Wars"	January 21, 2009
68	10	"Super Bowl Chef Showdown"	January 28, 2009
69	11	"Le Bernardin"	February 4, 2009
70	12	"The Last Supper"	February 11, 2009
71	13	"Finale - Part I"	February 18, 2009
72	14	"Finale - Part II"	February 25, 2009
73	15	"Watch What Happens Reunion"	March 4, 2009

=== Las Vegas (season 6) ===
No. overall	No. in season	Title	Original release date
74	1	"Sin City Vice"	August 19, 2009
75	2	"Bachelor/ette Party"	August 26, 2009
76	3	"Thunderbirds"	September 2, 2009
77	4	"Vivre Las Vegas"	September 9, 2009
78	5	"Camping"	September 16, 2009
79	6	"Penn & Teller"	September 23, 2009
80	7	"Dinner Party"	October 7, 2009
81	8	"Pigs and Pinot"	October 14, 2009
82	9	"Restaurant Wars"	October 21, 2009
83	10	"Meat Natalie"	October 28, 2009
84	11	"Top Chef All-Stars Dinner"	November 4, 2009
85	12	"Strip Around the World"	November 11, 2009
86	13	"Culinary Olympics"	November 18, 2009
87	14	"Napa Finale, Part 1"	December 2, 2009
88	15	"Napa Finale, Part 2"	December 9, 2009
89	16	"Watch What Happens Reunion"	December 16, 2009

=== D.C. (season 7) ===
No. overall	No. in season	Title	Original release date
90	1	"House of Chef-presentatives"	June 16, 2010
91	2	"Outside the Lunch Box"	June 23, 2010
92	3	"Capitol Grill"	June 30, 2010
93	4	"Room Service"	July 7, 2010
94	5	"Farm Policy"	July 14, 2010
95	6	"Cold War"	July 21, 2010
96	7	"Power Lunch"	July 28, 2010
97	8	"Foreign Affairs"	August 4, 2010
98	9	"Restaurant Wars"	August 11, 2010
99	10	"Covert Cuisine"	August 18, 2010
100	11	"Making Concessions"	August 25, 2010
101	12	"Gastro-nauts"	September 1, 2010
102	13	"Season Finale, Part I"	September 8, 2010
103	14	"Season Finale, Part II"	September 15, 2010
104	15	"Reunion"	September 22, 2010

=== All-Stars (season 8) ===
No. overall	No. in season	Title	Original release date	US viewers (millions)
105	1	"History Never Repeats"	December 1, 2010	1.66
106	2	"Night at the Museum"	December 8, 2010	2.03
107	3	"New York's Finest"	December 15, 2010	1.98
108	4	"Advantage Chef"	December 22, 2010	2.12
109	5	"Dim Sum Lose Some"	January 5, 2011	N/A
110	6	"We're Gonna Need a Bigger Boat"	January 12, 2011	2.36
111	7	"Restaurant Wars - One Night Only"	January 19, 2011	2.33
112	8	"An Offer They Can't Refuse"	February 2, 2011	2.34
113	9	"Feeding Fallon"	February 9, 2011	2.23
114	10	"Lock Down"	February 16, 2011	N/A
115	11	"For the Gulf"	February 23, 2011	2.61
116	12	"Give Me Your Huddled Masses"	March 2, 2011	2.48
117	13	"Fit For a King"	March 9, 2011	2.44
118	14	"Island Fever"	March 16, 2011	2.26
119	15	"The Last Supper"	March 23, 2011	2.38
120	16	"Finale"	March 30, 2011	2.77
121	17	"Reunion"	April 6, 2011	1.68

=== Texas (season 9) ===
No. overall	No. in season	Title	Original release date	US viewers (millions)
122	1	"Everything's Bigger in Texas"	November 2, 2011	1.59
123	2	"The Heat Is On"	November 9, 2011	1.64
124	3	"Quinceañera"	November 16, 2011	1.45
125	4	"Red Hot Chili Cook-Off"	November 23, 2011	1.67
126	5	"Don't Be Tardy for the Dinner Party"	November 30, 2011	1.86
127	6	"Higher Steaks"	December 7, 2011	1.70
128	7	"Game On"	December 14, 2011	1.74
129	8	"Tribute Dinner"	December 21, 2011	1.69
130	9	"BBQ Pit Wars"	January 4, 2012	1.94
131	10	"Restaurant Wars"	January 11, 2012	1.82
132	11	"Fit for an Evil Queen"	January 18, 2012	2.00
133	12	"Block Party"	January 25, 2012	1.83
134	13	"Bike, Borrow & Steal"	February 1, 2012	2.01
135	14	"Mentors at Work?"	February 8, 2012	2.02
136	15	"Culinary Games"	February 15, 2012	1.74
137	16	"Fire and Ice"	February 22, 2012	1.79
138	17	"Finale"	February 29, 2012	1.85
139	18	"Reunion"	March 7, 2012	1.04

=== Seattle (season 10) ===
No. overall	No. in season	Title	Original release date
140	1	"The Ultimate Chef Test"	November 7, 2012
141	2	"A Shock at the Space Needle"	November 14, 2012
142	3	"Tom vs. Emeril: Turkeypocalypse"	November 21, 2012
143	4	"'50s Food Flashback"	November 28, 2012
144	5	"Pike Place Pickle"	December 5, 2012
145	6	"Even the Famous Come Home"	December 12, 2012
146	7	"Foiled Again"	December 19, 2012
147	8	"Jalapeño Business"	December 26, 2012
148	9	"Past Suppers"	January 2, 2013
149	10	"Battle Before the War"	January 9, 2013
150	11	"Restaurant Wars"	January 16, 2013
151	12	"Wolfgang Clucks"	January 23, 2013
152	13	"Chefs at Sea"	January 30, 2013
153	14	"Kings of Alaska"	February 6, 2013
154	15	"Glacial Gourmand"	February 13, 2013
155	16	"Finale Part 1"	February 20, 2013
156	17	"Finale Part 2"	February 27, 2013

=== New Orleans (season 11) ===
No. overall	No. in season	Title	Original release date
157	1	"Soiree in the Swamp"	October 2, 2013
158	2	"Rebuilding New Orleans"	October 9, 2013
159	3	"Commander's Palace"	October 16, 2013
160	4	"Captain Vietnam"	October 23, 2013
161	5	"Lea Michele's Halloween Bash"	October 30, 2013
162	6	"Campfires, Cream Cheese and Countryside"	November 6, 2013
163	7	"Jazz Hands"	November 13, 2013
164	8	"Piggin' Out"	November 20, 2013
165	9	"Restaurant Wars"	December 4, 2013
166	10	"Like Mama Made"	December 11, 2013
167	11	"Giving It the College Try"	December 18, 2013
168	12	"Mississippi Mud Bugs"	January 1, 2014
169	13	"Oui Si a Challenge"	January 8, 2014
170	14	"Po' Boy Smackdown"	January 15, 2014
171	15	"Leaving New Orleans"	January 22, 2014
172	16	"Maui Wowie"	January 29, 2014
173	17	"Finale"	February 5, 2014

=== Boston (season 12) ===
No. overall	No. in season	Title	Original release date	US viewers (millions)
174	1	"Sudden Death"	October 15, 2014	1.09
175	2	"Boston's Bravest and Finest"	October 22, 2014	0.98
176	3	"The Curse of the Bambino"	October 29, 2014	1.05
177	4	"12 Chefs Walk Into a Bar..."	November 5, 2014	0.91
178	5	"It's War"	November 12, 2014	0.90
179	6	"The First Thanksgiving"	November 19, 2014	0.95
180	7	"Restaurant Wars"	December 3, 2014	0.96
181	8	"Clean Up in Aisle 2!"	December 10, 2014	0.98
182	9	"Big Sausage"	December 17, 2014	0.98
183	10	"For Julia & Jacques"	January 7, 2015	1.02
184	11	"Sous Your Daddy!"	January 14, 2015	1.09
185	12	"The Final Battle of Bean Town"	January 21, 2015	0.99
186	13	"Getting Prickly In Mexico"	January 28, 2015	1.11
187	14	"Holy Escamoly!"	February 4, 2015	0.89
188	15	"Mano a Mano"	February 11, 2015	0.96

=== California (season 13) ===
No. overall	No. in season	Title	Original release date	US viewers (millions)
189	1	"Stop the Presses"	December 2, 2015	0.80
190	2	"Pop Up Pandemonium"	December 3, 2015	0.84
191	3	"Spines and Vines"	December 10, 2015	0.89
192	4	"It's a Dry Heat"	December 17, 2015	0.85
193	5	"Big Gay Wedding"	January 7, 2016	0.91
194	6	"Banannaise"	January 14, 2016	0.90
195	7	"Back in the Day"	January 21, 2016	1.15
196	8	"Where's the Beef?"	January 28, 2016	0.97
197	9	"Restaurant Wars, Part 1"	February 4, 2016	0.93
198	10	"Restaurant Wars, Part 2"	February 11, 2016	0.86
199	11	"Hammer Time"	February 18, 2016	0.88
200	12	"Wok This Way"	February 25, 2016	0.83
201	13	"Where It All Started"	March 3, 2016	0.88
202	14	"Magic Hour"	March 10, 2016	0.92
203	15	"Finale"	March 17, 2016	1.17

=== Charleston (season 14) ===
No. overall	No. in season	Title	Original release date	US viewers (millions)
204	1	"Something Old, Something New"	December 1, 2016	0.80
205	2	"Southern Hospitality"	December 8, 2016	0.83
206	3	"Choke Holds and Clammy Hands"	December 15, 2016	0.82
207	4	"The Feast of Seven Trash Fishes"	December 22, 2016	0.78
208	5	"Smoke 'Em If You Got 'Em"	December 29, 2016	0.97
209	6	"A Southern Legend"	January 5, 2017	1.06
210	7	"Booty"	January 12, 2017	1.06
211	8	"Restaurant Wars"	January 19, 2017	1.01
212	9	"For the Kids"	January 26, 2017	1.13
213	10	"Shrimp Boats and Hat Ladies"	February 2, 2017	1.02
214	11	"Adiós Charleston, Hello James Beard"	February 9, 2017	0.88
215	12	"Cooking Away in Margaritaville"	February 16, 2017	1.04
216	13	"Trial By Fire"	February 23, 2017	0.97
217	14	"Comida Final"	March 2, 2017	1.29

=== Colorado (season 15) ===
No. overall	No. in season	Title	Original release date	US viewers (millions)
218	1	"It'll Take More than Pot Luck"	December 7, 2017	0.88
219	2	"Smile and Say Mise"	December 14, 2017	0.78
220	3	"Keep on Truckin"	December 21, 2017	0.81
221	4	"Little Tools, Big Challenge"	December 28, 2017	0.99
222	5	"This Is Not Glamping"	January 4, 2018	0.96
223	6	"Now That's a Lot of Schnitzel"	January 11, 2018	0.85
224	7	"Olympic Dreams"	January 18, 2018	0.86
225	8	"Restaurant Wars"	January 25, 2018	0.81
226	9	"Bronco Brouhaha"	February 1, 2018	0.88
227	10	"Red Rum and Then Some"	February 8, 2018	0.80
228	11	"Cooking High"	February 15, 2018	0.84
229	12	"Sunday Supper"	February 22, 2018	0.74
230	13	"A Little Place Called Aspen"	March 1, 2018	0.77
231	14	"Finale"	March 8, 2018	0.93

=== Kentucky (season 16) ===
No. overall	No. in season	Title	Original release date	US viewers (millions)
232	1	"The Fastest Two Minutes in Cooking"	December 6, 2018	0.83
233	2	"Bourbon, Barrels and Burgoo"	December 13, 2018	0.70
234	3	"Naughty and Nice"	December 20, 2018	0.87
235	4	"Surprise...It's Restaurant Wars"	December 27, 2018	0.96
236	5	"Restaurant Wars Part 2"	January 3, 2019	1.13
237	6	"Roaring Munchies"	January 10, 2019	0.98
238	7	"Carne!"	January 17, 2019	1.02
239	8	"Whatever Floats Your Boat"	January 24, 2019	0.98
240	9	"Music City USA"	January 31, 2019	1.03
241	10	"Hoop Dreams"	February 7, 2019	0.93
242	11	"The Greatest"	February 14, 2019	0.98
243	12	"Kentucky Farewell"	February 21, 2019	0.91
244	13	"Holy Macau!"	February 28, 2019	0.96
245	14	"The Tao of Macau"	March 7, 2019	0.94
246	15	"Finale"	March 14, 2019	0.91

=== All-Stars L.A. (season 17) ===
No. overall	No. in season	Title	Original release date	US viewers (millions)
247	1	"It's Like They Never Left!"	March 19, 2020	0.76
248	2	"The Jonathan Gold Standard"	March 26, 2020	0.82
249	3	"Strokes of Genius"	April 2, 2020	0.83
250	4	"You're So Fresh!"	April 9, 2020	0.91
251	5	"Bring Your Loved One to Work"	April 16, 2020	0.82
252	6	"Get Your Phil"	April 23, 2020	0.91
253	7	"Pitch Perfect"	April 30, 2020	0.89
254	8	"Restaurant Wars"	May 7, 2020	0.94
255	9	"Cabin Fever"	May 14, 2020	0.89
256	10	"Colossal Coliseum Kaiseki"	May 21, 2020	0.84
257	11	"Michael's Santa Monica"	May 28, 2020	0.90
258	12	"Lucca"	June 4, 2020	0.84
259	13	"Parma"	June 11, 2020	0.99
260	14	"Finito!"	June 18, 2020	1.04

=== Portland (season 18) ===
No. overall	No. in season	Title	Original release date	US viewers (millions)
261	1	"First Impressions"	April 1, 2021	0.82
262	2	"Trouble Brewing"	April 8, 2021	0.73
263	3	"Pan African Portland"	April 15, 2021	0.74
264	4	"Thrown for a Loop"	April 22, 2021	0.89
265	5	"Meet You at the Drive-In"	April 29, 2021	0.89
266	6	"Stumptown U.S.A."	May 6, 2021	0.90
267	7	"Feeding the Frontlines"	May 13, 2021	0.85
268	8	"Restaurant Wars"	May 20, 2021	0.78
269	9	"Portland-ia"	May 27, 2021	0.83
270	10	"Tournament of Tofu"	June 3, 2021	0.77
271	11	"Blind Ambitions"	June 10, 2021	0.83
272	12	"The Cheesier the Better"	June 17, 2021	0.89
273	13	"Shellfishly Delicious"	June 24, 2021	0.82
274	14	"The Next Top Chef Is..."	July 1, 2021	0.89

=== Houston (season 19) ===
No. overall	No. in season	Title	Original release date	US viewers (millions)
275	1	"Primal Instincts"	March 3, 2022	0.70
276	2	"Friday Night Bites"	March 10, 2022	0.79
277	3	"Noodles and Rice and Everything Nice"	March 17, 2022	0.75
278	4	"Doppelgängers"	March 24, 2022	0.76
279	5	"Don't Mess with BBQ"	March 31, 2022	0.83
280	6	"Texas Trailblaze-hers"	April 7, 2022	0.77
281	7	"Swallow the Competition"	April 14, 2022	0.66
282	8	"Restaurant Wars"	April 21, 2022	0.74
283	9	"Freedmen's Town"	April 28, 2022	0.73
284	10	"Dinner in Zero Gravity"	May 5, 2022	0.71
285	11	"Family Vacation"	May 12, 2022	0.69
286	12	"We're on a Boat"	May 19, 2022	0.72
287	13	"Cactus Makes Perfect"	May 26, 2022	0.63
288	14	"The Final Plate"	June 2, 2022	0.69

=== World All-Stars (season 20) ===
No. overall	No. in season	Title	Original release date	US viewers (millions)
289	1	"London Calling"	March 9, 2023	0.61
290	2	"Rice Rice, Baby"	March 16, 2023	0.66
291	3	"Cheeky Pints and Pub Bites"	March 23, 2023	0.66
292	4	"Spurred Lines"	March 30, 2023	0.52
293	5	"Holiday Vacation"	April 6, 2023	0.62
294	6	"Top Chef Is No Picnic"	April 13, 2023	0.57
295	7	"Hands Off"	April 20, 2023	0.67
296	8	"Street Food Fight"	April 27, 2023	0.55
297	9	"Restaurant Wars"	May 4, 2023	0.63
298	10	"Thali Time"	May 11, 2023	0.53
299	11	"Battle of the Wellingtons"	May 18, 2023	0.64
300	12	"Goodbye, London!"	May 25, 2023	0.73
301	13	"Champions in Paris"	June 1, 2023	0.64
302	14	"Fin."	June 8, 2023	0.68

=== Wisconsin (season 21) ===
No. overall	No. in season	Title	Original release date	US viewers (millions)
303	1	"Chef's Test"	March 20, 2024	0.49
304	2	"Living the High Life"	March 27, 2024	0.49
305	3	"Take It Cheesy"	April 3, 2024	0.49
306	4	"The Wright Way"	April 10, 2024	0.52
307	5	"Supper Club"	April 17, 2024	0.54
308	6	"Chaos Cuisine"	April 24, 2024	0.54
309	7	"Sausage Race"	May 1, 2024	0.58
310	8	"Restaurant Wars"	May 8, 2024	0.52
311	9	"The Good Land"	May 15, 2024	0.50
312	10	"Door County Fish Boil"	May 22, 2024	0.49
313	11	"Lay It All on the Table"	May 29, 2024	0.65
314	12	"Goodbye, Wisconsin"	June 5, 2024	0.51
315	13	"Set Sail"	June 12, 2024	0.69
316	14	"Cruising to a Win"	June 19, 2024	0.67

=== Destination Canada (season 22) ===
No. overall	No. in season	Title	Original release date	US viewers (millions)
317	1	"Across Canada, We Go!"	March 13, 2025	0.47
318	2	"Brunch à la Boulud"	March 20, 2025	0.44
319	3	"Best Served Cold"	March 27, 2025	0.33
320	4	"Top Chef Trivia"	April 3, 2025	0.45
321	5	"Line Cook for a Day"	April 10, 2025	0.48
322	6	"Pickle Me This"	April 17, 2025	0.41
323	7	"You Wanna Pizza Me?"	April 24, 2025	0.38
324	8	"Restaurant Wars"	May 1, 2025	0.44
325	9	"Cooking on the Edge"	May 8, 2025	0.39
326	10	"From Dep Till Dawn"	May 15, 2025	0.40
327	11	"Calgary, Yahoo!"	May 22, 2025	0.48
328	12	"Foraged in Fire"	May 29, 2025	0.46
329	13	"Viva Milano!"	June 5, 2025	0.54
330	14	"Finito"	June 12, 2025	0.46

=== Carolinas (season 23) ===
No. overall	No. in season	Title	Original release date	US viewers (millions)
331	1	"Carolina Roots"	March 9, 2026	0.37
332	2	"Puckerbutt"	March 16, 2026	0.28
333	3	"True Colors"	March 23, 2026	0.34
334	4	"Pick a Side"	March 30, 2026	0.34
335	5	"Cut and Dry"	April 6, 2026	0.41
336	6	"Going Whole Hog"	April 13, 2026	0.34
337	7	"Desserts Fit for a Queen"	April 20, 2026	0.36
338	8	"Restaurant Wars"	April 27, 2026	0.37
339	9	"The Ultimate Dinner Party"	May 4, 2026	0.33
340	10	"Hook, Line & Dinner"	May 11, 2026	0.38
341	11	"Down the Rabbit Hole"	May 18, 2026	0.20
342	12	"Appalachian Celebration"	May 25, 2026	0.40
343	13	"Plate Expectations"	June 1, 2026	0.35
344	14	"The Final Toast"	June 8, 2026	TBD
