= List of Dirty Jobs home video releases =

This is a list of Dirty Jobs DVDs and media that have been released in region 1 and 4 from the TV show Dirty Jobs.

== Media ==
=== Downloadable ===
This is a list of Dirty Jobs episodes that were released online for download individually or as sets on iTunes. Amazon.com and Netflix also feature select streamable episodes.

| Set name | No. of episodes | Run time (minutes) | Release |
|---|---|---|---|
| Dirty Jobs, Season 1 | 34 | Uncounted | July 31, 2006 |
| Dirty Jobs, Season 2 | 24 | Uncounted | November 28, 2006 |
| Dirty Jobs, Season 3 | 26 | Uncounted | January 15, 2008 |
| Dirty Jobs, Season 4 | 24 | Uncounted | January 20, 2009 |
| Dirty Jobs, Season 5 | 19 | Uncounted | October 19, 2010 |
| Dirty Jobs, Season 6 | 9 | 383 | December 11, 2011 |
| Dirty Jobs, Season 7 | 4 | 174 | August 22, 2012 |
| Dirty Jobs, Mike Rowe's Top Ten | 10 | 416 | October 12, 2009 |

=== DVD releases ===
==== Sets ====
| DVD name | No. of episodes | Run time (minutes) | Release |
|---|---|---|---|
| Dirty Jobs Season 1 DVD Set (original 5 DVD set) (two versions of box packaging) | 10 | 500 | Unknown |
| Dirty Jobs Season 1 DVD Set (2 DVD set) | 10 | 430 | July 2006 |
| Dirty Jobs Season 1 DVD Set (alternative set) | 16 | 800 | Unknown |
| Dirty Jobs Season 2 DVD Set | 25 | 1,080 | January 28, 2008 |
| Dirty Jobs Season 3 DVD Set | 23 | 1,032 | 2008 |
| Dirty Jobs Season 4 DVD Set | 25 | 1,075 | April 6, 2010 |
| Dirty Jobs Season 5 DVD Set | 17 | 817 | 2011 |
| Dirty Jobs – Collection 1 | 9 | 494 | September 4, 2007 |
| Dirty Jobs – Collection 2 | 12 | 502 | February 5, 2008 |
| Dirty Jobs – Collection 3 | 12 | 480 | August 26, 2008 |
| Dirty Jobs – Collection 4 | 13 | 576 | February 24, 2009 |
| Dirty Jobs – Collection 5 | 17 | 430 | January 26, 2010 |
| Dirty Jobs – Collection 6 | 11 | 430 | September 7, 2010 |
| Dirty Jobs – Collection 7 | 10 | 430 | May 3, 2011 |
| Dirty Jobs – Collection 8 | 10 | 450 | August 7, 2012 |
| Dirty Jobs – Something Fishy | 4 | 167 | February 23, 2010 |
| Dirty Jobs – Toughest Jobs | 5 | 220 | May 15, 2012 |
| Dirty Jobs Down Under | 4 | 176 | March 11, 2014 |

==== Individual DVDs ====
This is a list of individual DVDs that are not on season or collection sets. For example, episodes featured here may be included on a season or collection set, but were sold on a different DVD as well. All DVDs in this list were released by Discovery.

| DVD name | No. of episodes | Run time (minutes) | Release |
|---|---|---|---|
| Jobs That Bite & Jobs That Bite Harder | 2 | 100 | Unknown |
| Bat Cave Scavenger & Worm Dung Farmer | 2 | Unknown | Unknown |
| Bell Maker & Mosquito Control Officer | 2 | 86 | Unknown |
| Billboard Installer & Snake Wrangler | 2 | | Unknown |
| Bug Breeder & Poo Pot Maker | 2 | 86 | Unknown |
| Cave Digger & Salt Miner | 2 | 86 | Unknown |
| Chick Sexer & Vexcon | 2 | 100 | Unknown |
| Hoof Cleaner | 1 | 50 | Unknown |
| Micro Algae Man & Chimney Sweeper | 2 | 100 | Unknown |
| Mule Logger & Well Digger | 2 | 86 | Unknown |
| Ostrich Farmer & Cheese Maker | 2 | 100 | Unknown |
| Roadkill Cleaners & Chinatown Garbage Collector | 2 | 100 | Unknown |
| Sewer Inspector & Pig Farmer | 2 | 100 | Unknown |
| Shrimper and Bio-Diesel Man | 2 | 100 | Unknown |
| Sludge Cleaner & Hot Tar Roofer | 2 | 100 | Unknown |
| Snake Researcher & Penguin Keeper | 2 | 86 | Unknown |
| Wine Maker & Steam Ship Cleaner | 2 | 86 | Unknown |
| Avian Vomitologist & Turkey Farmer | 2 | 100 | Unknown |
| Alligator Farmer | 1 | 50 | Unknown |
| Mushroom Farmer & Plumber | 2 | 100 | Unknown |
| Termite Controller & Casino Food Recycler | 2 | 100 | Unknown |
| Parade Float Dismantler & Garbage Pit Technician | 2 | 100 | Unknown |
| Geoduck Farmer & Fuel Tank Cleaner | 2 | 100 | Unknown |
| Skull Cleaner & Coal Miner | 2 | 100 | Unknown |
| 100th Dirty Job 2-Hour Special | 1 | 120 | Unknown |

==== Sets featured on ====
This is a list of DVD sets that Dirty Jobs has been featured on, but which do not feature Dirty Jobs exclusively.

| DVD name | No. of episodes | Run time (minutes) | Release |
|---|---|---|---|
| Best of Discovery: Vol. 3 - Sewer Inspector, Pig Farming, Ostrich Farming | 3 | 52 | 2006 |
| Best of Discovery: Vol. 6 | ? | Unknown | Unknown |
| Men of Discovery (Man vs. Wild, Mythbusters, American Chopper, Dirty Jobs, Survivorman) | ? | Unknown | March 2, 2010 |
| Shark Week: The Great Bites Collection - Standard | ? | 356 | July 14, 2009 |

==== Region 4 ====
This is a list of DVD sets that were produced for region 4.

| DVD name | No. of episodes | Run time (minutes) | Release |
|---|---|---|---|
| Dirty Jobs: Elbow Grease Collection | ? | 504 | March 10, 2010 |
| Dirty Jobs: Daily Grind Collection | ? | 533 | May 5, 2010 |
| Dirty Jobs Down Under | 4 | 180 | October 2, 2013 |
