= List of Texas Flip N Move episodes =

Texas Flip N Move is an American reality television series airing on DIY Network, located between Fort Worth and Decatur.

== Series overview ==
Season	Episodes	Originally released	
Season	Episodes	First released	Last released
1	9	November 11, 2014	March 6, 2015
2	13	September 18, 2015	December 11, 2015
3	13	January 8, 2016	April 1, 2016
4	13	July 15, 2016	October 7, 2016
5	13	November 25, 2016	March 3, 2017
6	13	April 7, 2017	June 30, 2017
7	13	October 6, 2017	January 12, 2018
8	13	February 2, 2018	June 1, 2018
9	13 + 3 special	February 23, 2018	August 10, 2018
10	13 + 3 special	August 17, 2018	November 30, 2018
11	13	December 7, 2018	April 5, 2019
12	TBA	April 12, 2019	TBA

== Episodes ==
=== Season 1 ===
No.	Title	Original release date
1	"Old Houses Get Moved Out As Three Families Compete to Truck Them Aways and Flip Them for Pro"	November 11, 2014
2	"Old Houses Get New Addresses"	January 9, 2015
3	"Woman Cave vs Home Office"	January 16, 2015
4	"Glam Cabin vs. Rooster Reno"	January 23, 2015
5	"The Snow Sisters Renovate an Old Telephone House Built in 1925"	January 30, 2015
6	"Shipping Container House Vs Studio Loft House"	February 6, 2015
7	"Hardwood House Vs. Stinky Disaster"	February 13, 2015
8	"The Snow Sisters Flip a Quaint Cottage Against Randy's Texas-Sized Tiny House"	February 20, 2015
9	"Suzi's Custom Bling Closet Remodel"	February 27, 2015
10	"The Slay's School Building Transformation Vs the Snow Sister's Reconditioned Quick Flip"	March 6, 2015

=== Season 2 ===
No.	Title	Original release date
1	"The Young Guns' Over-the-Top Barn Meets the Lone Wolf's Live-and-Work Loft"	September 18, 2015
2	"Randy Gets a Gem of a House and the Snows Turn a Silo Into a Suite"	September 25, 2015
3	"An Old Piano Inspires a Country Melody Themed Home"	October 2, 2015
4	"Dual House Designer Duel"	October 9, 2015
5	"Captain Cody and the Houseboat of Horrors vs. Randy's Bayou Shack"	October 16, 2015
6	"The Snows Make Over a Duplex With a Bird Theme"	October 23, 2015
7	"The Young Guns' Dollar Deal vs. The Snows' Writer's Retreat"	October 30, 2015
8	"The Young Guns Duplex Debacle Brings Down the House"	November 6, 2015
9	"Young Guns' Camouflage Container Lodge vs. Snows' Petite Victorian Playhouse"	November 13, 2015
10	"The Snow Sisters Each Design One Half of a House"	November 20, 2015
11	"Randy's Far-Out Flip vs. Northwest Cabin"	November 27, 2015
12	"Snow's Rustic Western Themed Ranch House Renovation"	December 4, 2015
13	"Randy's Vintage Airstream Dream vs. Young Gun's Rolling Retreat"	December 11, 2015

=== Season 3 ===
No.	Title	Original release date
1	"The Snow Sisters Tiny Shack Shake-Up vs. Cousin Casey's Old Church Conversion"	January 8, 2016
2	"The Snow's Family Homestead Renovation"	January 15, 2016
3	"Casey's Two From One House Split?"	January 22, 2016
4	"Young Guns Garage Reboot vs. Randy's Modern Makeover"	January 29, 2016
5	"The Snow Sisters' Ramshackle Restoration?"	February 5, 2016
6	"The Lone Wolf vs. the Snows' Guest Ranch Houses"	February 12, 2016
7	"The Lone Wolf and Casey Team Up"	February 19, 2016
8	"The Snow Sisters Make Converting Containers Into a Family Affair"	February 26, 2016
9	"The Lone Wolf's Nightmare vs. Casey's Too Tall Lake House"	March 4, 2016
10	"The Snows vs. the Lone Wolf Rent House Rivalry?"	March 11, 2016
11	"Casey's Home Based Business Flip"	March 18, 2016
12	"The Lone Wolf's Empty Nest Syndrome"	March 25, 2016
13	"The Lone Wolf's Bottomless Cabin vs. the Snows Former Office Flip"	April 1, 2016

=== Season 4 ===
No.	Title	Original release date
1	"Snows Hit the Rails With a Vintage Passenger Train"	July 15, 2016
2	"Flipping Two With a Little Help"	July 22, 2016
3	"Cute House With Inner Catastrophe"	July 29, 2016
4	"Casey and Catrina's Bunkhouse vs. Gary's Girls' Flunk House"	August 5, 2016
5	"Tackling An Industrial Train Car And A House That Can't Move"	August 12, 2016
6	"Casey And Catrina's Woodsy Guest House"	August 19, 2016
7	"Randy's Coastal Home vs. Snow Sisters' Cozy Ranch"	August 26, 2016
8	"Half a House vs. Family Home"	September 2, 2016
9	"The Snow Sisters' Tuscan Villa vs. Gary's Girls' Modern Glam Makeover"	September 9, 2016
10	"The Container Collaboration"	September 16, 2016
11	"Eco-Friendly House vs. Hot Mess"	September 23, 2016
12	"Mediterranean House vs. Two Barns"	September 30, 2016
13	"No Living Room Blues"	October 7, 2016

=== Season 5 ===
No.	Title	Original release date
1	"Randy's Hidden Shiplap Shack"	November 25, 2016
2	"The Snows' Modern Build vs. Casey and Catrina's Contemporary Crib"	December 2, 2016
3	"Gary's Girls Big Bin vs. Randy's Disastrous Deadline"	December 9, 2016
4	"Casey and Catrina's Total knockdown vs. Randy's Lucky Seven Jackpot"	December 16, 2016
5	"Family Friendly Oasis vs. No-Go"	January 6, 2017
6	"Beautiful Barndominium vs. Junkyard Jewel"	January 13, 2017
7	"Wine Country Habitat"	January 20, 2017
8	"Gary's Girls' Catalogue Kit House vs. Randy's Grand Colonial Creation"	January 27, 2017
9	"From Box to Bunkhouse"	February 3, 2017
10	"Duplex Doozy"	February 10, 2017
11	"The Snow Sisters' Roach-Infested Home vs. Randy's Cabin in the Woods"	February 17, 2017
12	"Two-Story vs. Spanish Villa"	February 24, 2017
13	"The Zen Den"	March 3, 2017

=== Season 6 ===
No.	Title	Original release date
1	"The Snow Sisters' Bare Bones Home vs. Randy's Moldy Mansion"	April 7, 2017
2	"Casey And Catrina's Upscale Upgrade"	April 14, 2017
3	"The Snow's Custom Cottage vs. Gary's Girls' Tiled Townhouse"	April 21, 2017
4	"Gary's Girls' Craftsman House Update"	April 28, 2017
5	"The Snows' Cool Kitchen vs. Casey and Catrina's Contemporary Flip"	May 5, 2017
6	"Paige and Raf's Modern Style vs. Casey and Catrina's Family Tree House"	May 12, 2017
7	"The Snow Sisters' Industrial Surprise"	May 19, 2017
8	"Gary's Girls' Elevator Barn Build"	May 26, 2017
9	"Randy's Airy Atrium vs. the Snows' Raised Roof"	June 2, 2017
10	"Randy's Bay Window Beauty vs. Casey And Catrina's Porch View"	June 9, 2017
11	"Gary's Girls' Latin American Abode"	June 16, 2017
12	"The Duplex Double"	June 23, 2017
13	"Paige and Raf Go East"	June 30, 2017

=== Season 7 ===
No.	Title	Original release date
1	"Knotty Pine vs. Chic Shack"	October 6, 2017
2	"Randy's Big Bed and Breakfast"	October 13, 2017
3	"Casey and Catrina's Door Debate"	October 20, 2017
4	"Money-Saving Design"	October 27, 2017
5	"Super Salvage vs. Shiplap Pad"	November 3, 2017
6	"Hot Lodge vs. Art Deco Digs"	November 10, 2017
7	"Gary and Jerry's Portable Pad vs. Gary's Girls' Upscale Upset"	November 17, 2017
8	"Paige and Raf's Fitness Farmhouse"	November 24, 2017
9	"Randy's Rec Room Reno vs. Gary's Girls Starter Home"	December 1, 2017
10	"Snow Sister's Little House vs. Gary and Jerry's Beach Build"	December 8, 2017
11	"Paige and Raf's Lakeside Cabin"	December 15, 2017
12	"Casey and Catrina's Kid-Friendly Home"	January 5, 2018
13	"Snow Sisters' School Bus Flip"	January 12, 2018

=== Season 8 ===
No.	Title	Original release date
1	"Casey and Catrina's Kid-Friendly Home"	February 2, 2018
2	"Sun Sanctuary vs. Mod-Rustic"	February 9, 2018
3	"Sideways Silo"	February 16, 2018
4	"Classic Reno vs. Messy Flop"	March 9, 2018
5	"Modern vs. Creole Cottage"	March 16, 2018
6	"Ranch-Style Office Conversion"	March 23, 2018
7	"Baker's Dream vs. Craftsman"	April 6, 2018
8	"Gary's Girls' Airplane Overhaul"	April 13, 2018
9	"Winner, Winner, Steak Dinner"	April 20, 2018
10	"Gary's Girls' Fashionista Flourish"	May 4, 2018
11	"Casey and Catrina's Refined Refuge"	May 11, 2018
12	"Mod Escape vs. Music Lair"	May 18, 2018
13	"Plush Palace"	June 1, 2018

=== Season 9 ===
No.	Title	Original release date
1	"Snow Sisters' Hill Country vs. Gary's Girls' Cozy Cottage"	February 23, 2018
2	"Casey and Catrina's Southwestern Style vs. the Snow's Secret Room"	March 2, 2018
3	"Snow Sisters' Updated Ranch"	March 30, 2018
4	"Snow Sisters' Southern Colonial Home"	April 27, 2018
Special	"Vintage Passenger Train vs. Texas-Sized Tiny House"	May 18, 2018
5	"Gary's Girls' Mountain Lodge vs. Snow Sisters' Family Abode"	May 25, 2018
6	"Randy's Wood Ranch vs. Casey and Catrina's Chic Bungalow"	June 8, 2018
7	"Gary's Girls' Tiny Farmhouse vs. the Boys' Tiny Lodge"	June 15, 2018
Special	"Lakeside Cabin vs. Silo Suite"	June 22, 2018
8	"Paige and Raf's Super Suburban"	June 29, 2018
Special	"Feel Good Flips"	July 6, 2018
9	"Snow Sisters' American Gothic Allure"	July 13, 2018
10	"Randy's Upscale Country Vs. Paige And Raf's Snag"	July 20, 2018
11	"Cook's Kitchen vs. Atomic Ranch"	July 27, 2018
12	"Randy's Cedar Chateau vs. Snow Sisters' Diamond in the Rough"	August 3, 2018
13	"Snow Sisters' Fine Design vs. Randy's Rough Cabin"	August 10, 2018

=== Season 10 ===
No.	Title	Original release date
1	"Snow Sisters' Cozy Cottage vs. Gary's Girls' Architectural Abode"	August 17, 2018
2	"Hayhurst Brothers' Midcentury vs. Casey and Catrina's French Guesthouse"	August 24, 2018
3	"Gary's Girls' Seaside Set-Up vs. Randy's Sensible Studio"	August 31, 2018
4	"Classic Home vs. Eclectic Suite"	September 7, 2018
Special	"Flipping Disasters"	September 14, 2018
5	"Paige and Raf's Fancy Farmhouse vs. Snow Sisters' Addition Nightmare"	September 21, 2018
6	"Paige and Raf's Dutch Dwelling vs. Casey and Catrina's Cape Cod"	September 28, 2018
Special	"Best of the Lone Wolf"	October 5, 2018
7	"Casey and Catrina's Rustic Residence vs. Snow Sisters' Country Cottage"	October 12, 2018
Special	"The Snows' Historic Renovation and Writer's Retreat"	October 19, 2018
8	"Paige & Raf's Residential Roost vs. Hayhurst Brothers' Vibrant Villa"	October 26, 2018
9	"Snow Sisters' Rustic Ranch"	November 2, 2018
10	"Randy's Shotgun Shanty vs. Hayhurst Brothers' Garden District Digs"	November 9, 2018
11	"Snow Sisters' Divided Domicile"	November 16, 2018
12	"Hayhurst Brothers' Church House Revival"	November 23, 2018
13	"Casey and Catrina's Pooch Paradise vs. Randy's Functional Farmhouse"	November 30, 2018

=== Season 11 ===
No.	Title	Original release date
1	"Casey and Catrina's Rural Refurb vs Gary's Girls' Quaint Cottage"	December 7, 2018
2	"Snow Sisters’ Traditional Residence"	January 11, 2019
3	"Shaker-Style Bungalow"	January 18, 2019
4	"French Farmhouse and Scandinavian Design"	January 25, 2019
5	"Snow Sisters’ Craftsman Bungalow"	February 1, 2019
6	"From Trash to Treasure"	February 8, 2019
7	"Gary's Girls' Mid-Century Modern Masterpiece"	February 15, 2019
8	"Casey and Catrina's Crafty House vs. Hayhurst Brothers' Modern Mother-In-Law Suite"	February 22, 2019
9	"Gary's Girls' Rustic Ranch"	March 1, 2019
Spécial	"Wine Country vs. Lake House"	March 8, 2019
10	"Paige and Raf's Colonial Castle"	March 15, 2019
11	"Snow Sisters' Traditional Tudor"	March 22, 2019
12	"Snow Sisters' Arched Abode"	March 29, 2019
13	"Snow Sisters' Sophisticated Ranch"	April 5, 2019

=== Season 12 ===
No.	Title	Original release date
1	"The Hayhurst Brothers' Modern Rustic Mansion"	April 12, 2019
2	"Gary's Girls' Light and Bright Renovation"	April 19, 2019
3	"The Snow Sisters' Breathtaking Bungalowdate"	April 26, 2019
4	"House of Blues"	May 3, 2019
5	"Hayhursts' High-End Paradise"	May 10, 2019
Spécial	"Kid-Friendly Home vs Family- Friendly Home"	May 17, 2019
6	"Elegant Entertainer"	May 24, 2019
7	"Upscale Transitional"	May 31, 2019
8	"Casey and Catrina's Tuscan Abode"	June 7, 2019
