= List of America's Test Kitchen episodes =

The following is a list of episodes of the public television cooking show America's Test Kitchen in the United States. The program started with 13 episodes in 2001, its first season. Beginning with the second season (2002), the show grew to 26 episodes per season.

== Series overview ==
Season	Episodes	Originally released	
Season	Episodes	First released	Last released
1	13	August 4, 2001	October 27, 2001
2	26	January 5, 2002	June 29, 2002
3	26	January 4, 2003	June 28, 2003
4	26	January 3, 2004	June 26, 2004
5	26	January 1, 2005	June 25, 2005
6	26	January 7, 2006	July 1, 2006
7	26	January 6, 2007	June 30, 2007
8	26	January 5, 2008	June 28, 2008
9	26	January 3, 2009	June 27, 2009
10	26	January 2, 2010	June 26, 2010
11	26	January 8, 2011	June 25, 2011
12	26	January 7, 2012	June 30, 2012
13	26	January 5, 2013	June 29, 2013
14	26	January 4, 2014	June 28, 2014
15	26	January 3, 2015	July 18, 2015
16	26	January 2, 2016	July 30, 2016
17	26	January 7, 2017	July 1, 2017
18	27	January 6, 2018	July 7, 2018
19	26	January 5, 2019	August 3, 2019
20	26	January 4, 2020	June 27, 2020
21	26	January 2, 2021	June 26, 2021
22	26	January 8, 2022	July 2, 2022
23	26	January 7, 2023	July 1, 2023
24	26	January 7, 2024	August 3, 2024
25	26	September 21, 2024	May 24, 2025
26	26	September 20, 2025	May 23, 2026
27	26	September 19, 2026	May 22, 2027

== Season 1 (2001) ==
No.	Title	Original release date
1	"Tomato Sauces for Pasta"	August 4, 2001
Recipes for pasta and fresh tomato sauce with garlic and basil, and rustic slow-simmered tomato sauce with meat. Featuring a Tasting Lab on canned diced tomatoes and a Science Desk segment exploring taste.
2	"The Perfect Roast Turkey"	August 11, 2001
A recipe for roast crisped-skin turkey. Featuring an Equipment Corner covering instant read thermometers, a Tasting Lab on store-bought turkey, and a Science Desk segment exploring how brining works.
3	"Great Roast Chicken"	August 18, 2001
A recipe for easy roast chicken. Featuring an Equipment Corner covering roasting racks, a Tasting Lab on supermarket chicken, and a Science Desk segment exploring white vs. dark meat.
4	"Beef Stew"	August 25, 2001
Recipes for beef stew with bacon, mushrooms, and pearl onions; hearty beef stew; beef carbonnade; and beef goulash. Featuring an Equipment Corner covering dutch ovens and a Science Desk segment exploring how browning meat seals in juiciness.
5	"Perfect Pork"	September 1, 2001
Recipes for pan-seared, oven-roasted thick-cut pork chops; and garlic studded roast pork loin. Featuring an Equipment Corner covering electric knives and a Science Desk segment exploring the role of fat.
6	"How to Cook Salmon"	September 8, 2001
Recipes for simple pan-seared salmon, simple grilled salmon, and broiled salmon with mustard and crisp dilled crust. Featuring a Science Desk segment exploring fish fat.
7	"Stir-Fry Made Easy"	September 15, 2001
Recipes for stir-fried chicken and zucchini in ginger sauce; stir-fried tofu, snow peas, and red onion in hot and sour sauce; and stir-fried shrimp, asparagus, and yellow pepper in lemon sauce. Featuring an Equipment Corner covering chef's knives and a Tasting Lab on soy sauce.
8	"Sunday Dinner"	September 22, 2001
Recipes for bacon-wrapped meatloaf with brown sugar-ketchup glaze, and garlic mashed potatoes. Featuring a Tasting Lab on ketchup and a Science Desk segment exploring garlic's changing flavor.
9	"Cooking Eggs"	September 29, 2001
Recipes for fluffy scrambled eggs, poached eggs, foolproof hard-cooked eggs, and fried eggs for two. Featuring an Equipment Corner covering non-stick skillets, a Tasting Lab on bacon, and a Science Desk segment exploring egg science.
10	"Cookie Jar Classics"	October 6, 2001
Recipes for thick and chewy chocolate chip cookies, big chewy oatmeal raisin cookies, and big, super-nutty peanut butter cookies. Featuring a Tasting Lab on dark chocolate chips and a Science Desk segment exploring baking soda.
11	"The Perfect All-Purpose Cake"	October 13, 2001
Recipes for yellow layer cake, and classic vanilla buttercream frosting. Featuring an Equipment Corner covering round cake pans and a Science Desk segment exploring protein in flour.
12	"Holiday Pies"	October 20, 2001
Recipes for American pie dough, perfect pecan pie, and the best pumpkin pie. Featuring an Equipment Corner covering pie plates.
13	"Crisps, Cobblers, and Gratins"	October 27, 2001
Recipes for fresh berry gratin, and fruit crisp. Featuring an Equipment Corner covering food processors and a Taste Lab on cinnamon.

== Season 2 (2002) ==
No.	Title	Original release date
14	"Three Pureed Vegetable Soups"	January 5, 2002
Recipes for cream of tomato soup, and creamy mushroom soup. Featuring an Equipment Corner covering blenders and a Tasting Lab on commercial chicken broth.
15	"Pesto, Carbonara, and Salad"	January 12, 2002
Recipes for bow-tie pasta with pesto, leafy salad, and spaghetti alla carbonara. Featuring an Equipment Corner covering salad spinners and a Tasting Lab on supermarket extra-virgin olive oils.
16	"Spaghetti and Meatball Supper"	January 19, 2002
Recipes for spaghetti and meatballs, and American garlic bread. Featuring an Equipment Corner covering bread knives and a Tasting Lab on Parmesan cheese.
17	"Pizza Night"	January 26, 2002
A recipe for deep-dish pizza. Featuring an Equipment Corner covering box graters and a Tasting Lab on mozzarella cheese.
18	"Simple Sandwiches"	February 2, 2002
Recipes for classic tuna salad, classic grilled cheese sandwiches, and flank steak and arugula sandwiches with red onion. Featuring a Tasting Lab on canned tuna and a Science Desk segment exploring mayonnaise emulsification.
19	"Shrimp Classics"	February 9, 2002
Recipes for herb-poached shrimp cocktail sauce, shrimp fra diavolo with linguine, and shrimp scampi. Featuring an Equipment Corner covering garlic presses and a Science Desk segment exploring changing garlic's flavor.
20	"Steak Frites"	February 16, 2002
Recipes for pan-seared steaks, shallot butter sauce, red wine sauce, and french fries. Featuring an Equipment Corner covering corkscrews and a Tasting Lab on red wines for cooking.
21	"Fried Chicken and 'Fixens"	February 23, 2002
Recipes for crispy fried chicken, creamy coleslaw, and sweet-and-sour coleslaw. Featuring an Equipment Corner covering cutting boards and a Science Desk segment exploring successful frying.
22	"Chicken Cutlets 101"	March 2, 2002
Recipes for chicken marsala, and stuffed chicken cutlets with three fillings. Featuring a Tasting Lab on bread crumbs and a Science Desk segment exploring the role of "fond" in pan sauces.
23	"All-American Cookout"	March 9, 2002
Recipes for grilled hamburgers with many toppings, and grilled vegetables. Featuring a Tasting Lab on hot dogs.
24	"Middle Eastern Barbeque"	March 16, 2002
Recipes for grilled shish kebab and baba ghanoush. Featuring an Equipment Corner covering grill tongs and a Science Desk segment exploring how marinades work.
25	"Fajitas and Margaritas"	March 23, 2002
Recipes for chunky guacamole, classic fajitas, and fresh margaritas. Featuring an Equipment Corner covering zesters.
26	"Thanksgiving Dinner"	March 30, 2002
Recipes for crisp-skin high-roast, butterflied turkey with sausage dressing, and turkey gravy. Featuring an Equipment Corner covering sauce pans.
27	"Christmas Dinner"	April 6, 2002
Recipes for prime rib, pommes anne, and blanched green beans. Featuring an Equipment Corner covering roasting pans and a Science Desk segment exploring why aging tenderizes beef.
28	"Winter Dinner"	April 13, 2002
Recipes for short ribs braised in red wine with bacon, parsnips and pearl onions; and mashed potatoes. Featuring an Equipment Corner covering food mills and a Science Desk segment exploring starch in potatoes.
29	"Ham, Biscuits, and Greens"	April 20, 2002
Recipes for Coca-Cola ham, cream biscuits, and quick-cooked tough greens. Featuring a Tasting Lab on all-purpose flour.
30	"Muffins and Scones"	April 27, 2002
Recipes for cinnamon-sugar-dipped blueberry muffins, and cream scones. Featuring an Equipment Corner covering muffin tins and a Tasting Lab on butter.
31	"Bacon, Eggs, and Homefries"	May 4, 2002
Recipes for diner-style home fries, oven-fried bacon, and cheese omelet. Featuring an Equipment Corner covering colanders and a Tasting Lab on orange juice.
32	"French Toast, Waffles, and Breakfast Strata"	May 11, 2002
Recipes for buttermilk waffles, French toast for challah or sandwich bread, and breakfast strata with spinach and gruyère. Featuring an Equipment Corner covering waffle irons and a Tasting Lab on maple syrup.
33	"Bar Cookies"	May 18, 2002
Recipes for chewy, fudgy triple-chocolate brownies; and raspberry squares. Featuring an Equipment Corner covering coffee makers, a Tasting Lab on raspberry preserves, and a Science Desk segment exploring chocolate flavor diffusion.
34	"Two French Tarts"	May 25, 2002
Recipes for sweet tart pastry (pâte sucrée), lemon tart, and fresh fruit tart with pastry cream. Featuring a Tasting Lab on lemon zest and extracts and a Science Desk segment exploring eggs and acid.
35	"Diner Pies"	June 1, 2002
Recipes for chocolate cream pie, key lime pie, and whipped cream. Featuring an Equipment Corner covering whisks and a Science Desk segment exploring temperature and whipped cream.
36	"Apple Pies"	June 8, 2002
Recipes for apple pie dough, and classic apple pie. Featuring an Equipment Corner covering paring knives and a Science Desk segment exploring what makes pastry flaky.
37	"Peach Pie"	June 15, 2002
A recipe for lattice-top fresh peach pie. Featuring a Tasting Lab on vanilla ice cream and a Science Desk segment exploring how starches work.
38	"Chilled Summer Puddings"	June 22, 2002
Recipes for summer berry puddings, panna cotta, and rhubarb fool. Featuring a Science Desk segment exploring how gelatin works.
39	"Chocolate Desserts"	June 29, 2002
Recipes for espresso-mascarpone cream, dark chocolate ganache, and bittersweet chocolate roulade. Featuring a Tasting Lab on bittersweet chocolate and a Science Desk segment exploring how to beat egg whites.

== Season 3 (2003) ==
No.	Title	Original release date
40	"Party Foods"	January 4, 2003
Recipes for cheese nachos, fresh guacamole, one-minute salsa, and buffalo wings. Featuring a Tasting Lab on tortilla chips.
41	"Hearty Soups"	January 11, 2003
Recipes for ham and split pea soup, and rustic potato-leek soup. Featuring an Equipment Corner covering vegetable peelers and a Tasting Lab on salt.
42	"Dressing Up Vegetables"	January 18, 2003
Recipes for twice-baked potatoes, and classic stuffed bell peppers. Featuring an Equipment Corner covering pepper mills and a Tasting Lab on black pepper.
43	"Bistro Basics"	January 25, 2003
Recipes for steak au poivre with branded cream sauce, and classic cream brulee. Featuring an Equipment Corner covering torches and a Science Desk segment exploring how egg yolks thicken custard.
44	"Steak House Dinners"	February 1, 2003
Recipes for pan-seared filet mignon, and leafy salad with blue cheese dressing. Featuring an Equipment Corner covering steak knives and a Tasting Lab on blue cheese.
45	"Chinese Takeout"	February 8, 2003
Recipes for fried rice with shrimp, pork, and shiitake mushrooms; and kung pao shrimp. Featuring an Equipment Corner covering rice cookers and a Tasting Lab on long-grain rice.
46	"Chicken in a Flash"	February 15, 2003
Recipes for pan-roasted chicken with shallot and Vermouth sauce, and chicken piccata. Featuring an Equipment Corner covering inexpensive nonstick skillets.
47	"Pasta Classics"	February 22, 2003
Recipes for spaghetti puttanesca, and fettuccine with bolognese sauce. Featuring an Equipment Corner covering saute pans and a Science Desk segment exploring what makes some pasta so sticky.
48	"Pasta Quick and Easy"	March 1, 2003
Recipes for pasta with garlic and oil, and simple lasagna with hearty tomato-meat sauce. Featuring an Equipment Corner covering pasta paraphernalia and a Tasting Lab on no-boil lasagna noodles.
49	"Beef Burgundy"	March 8, 2003
A recipe for beef burgundy. Featuring an Equipment Corner covering oven thermometers.
50	"Texas Chili"	March 15, 2003
A recipe for chili con carne. Featuring an Equipment Corner covering pot scrubbers and a Science Desk segment exploring why we eat chilies.
51	"American Casseroles"	March 22, 2003
Recipes for baked macaroni and cheese, and turkey tetrazzini. Featuring a Tasting Lab on cheddar cheese and a Science Desk segment exploring why evaporated milk doesn't curdle.
52	"Pork Chops, Two Ways"	March 29, 2003
Recipes for gas-grilled pork chops, and smothered pork chops. Featuring an Equipment Corner covering gas grills, a Tasting Lab on enhanced pork, and a Science Desk segment exploring how braising works.
53	"Backyard BBQ"	April 5, 2003
Recipes for barbecued baby back ribs, and American potato salad with hard-boiled eggs and sweet pickles. Featuring an Equipment Corner covering wood chucks and chips and a Tasting Lab on barbecue sauce.
54	"Barbecued Salmon"	April 12, 2003
Recipes for barbecued salmon, and creamy dill cucumber salad. Featuring an Equipment Corner covering charcoal grills and a Tasting Lab on paprika.
55	"Thanksgiving from the Grill"	April 19, 2003
Recipes for grill-roasted turkey, mashed sweet potatoes, and basic cranberry sauce. Featuring an Equipment Corner covering potato mashers.
56	"Holiday Dinner"	April 26, 2003
Recipes for roast beef tenderloin, parsley sauce with cornichons and capers, and scalloped potatoes. Featuring an Equipment Corner covering boning knives.
57	"Ham Dinner"	May 3, 2003
Recipes for spiral-sliced ham, and green bean casserole. Featuring an Equipment Corner covering timers and thermometers and a Tasting Lab on spiral-sliced hams.
58	"Weekend Brunch"	May 10, 2003
Recipes for sour cream coffee cake with brown sugar-pecan streusel, and fruit with reduction sauces. Featuring an Equipment Corner covering coffee grinders and a Science Desk segment exploring how decaffeination works.
59	"Quick Breads"	May 17, 2003
Recipes for quick cinnamon buns with buttermilk icing, and banana bread. Featuring an Equipment Corner covering loaf pans and a Science Desk segment exploring the magic of buttermilk.
60	"Rustic Bread at Home"	May 24, 2003
A recipe for rustic country bread. Featuring an Equipment Corner covering dry measuring cups and a Tasting Lab on yeast.
61	"Cookie Jar Favorites"	May 31, 2003
Recipes for thick and chewy double-chocolate cookies, and molasses spice cookies. Featuring an Equipment Corner covering measuring spoons.
62	"Lemon Meringue Pie"	June 7, 2003
A recipe for lemon meringue pie. Featuring an Equipment Corner covering rolling pins and a Tasting Lab on store-bought pie crusts.
63	"Shortcake and Cobbler"	June 14, 2003
Recipes for strawberry shortcake, and sour cherry cobbler. Featuring a Tasting Lab on cherries and a Science Desk segment exploring baking soda and browning.
64	"Two Chocolate Cakes"	June 21, 2003
Recipes for hot fudge pudding cake, and flourless chocolate cake. Featuring an Equipment Corner covering digital kitchen scales and a Science Desk segment exploring the allure of chocolate.
65	"New York Cheesecake"	June 28, 2003
Recipes for cheesecake, and fresh strawberry topping. Featuring an Equipment Corner covering kitchen timers, a Tasting Lab on store-bought cheesecakes, and a Science Desk segment exploring vanilla extracts.

== Season 4 (2004) ==
No.	Title	Original release date
66	"Salad 101"	January 3, 2004
Recipes for Greek salad, and wilted green salad and bacon dressing. Featuring a Tasting Lab on red wine vinegars and quick tips for a basic tossed salad.
67	"Summer Tomatoes"	January 10, 2004
Recipes for gaspacho, and quick summer tomato tart. Featuring a Tasting Lab on mozzarella cheese.
68	"One-Pot Wonders"	January 17, 2004
Recipes for beef chili with kidney beans, and indoor clambake. Featuring an Equipment Corner covering crock pots and a Tasting Lab on tomato puree.
69	"East Coast Seafood"	January 24, 2004
Recipes for New England clam chowder, and Maryland crab cakes. Featuring a Tasting Lab on mayonnaise.
70	"New Orleans Menu"	January 31, 2004
Recipes for Jambalaya, and bananas Foster. Featuring an Equipment Corner covering ice cream scoops and a Tasting Lab on vegetable broth.
71	"Freedom from Red Sauce"	February 7, 2004
Recipes for pasta with mushrooms, orecchiette with broccoli, and rabe and sausage. Featuring an Equipment Corner covering herb choppers and a Tasting Lab on extra virgin olive oil.
72	"Quick Pasta"	February 14, 2004
Recipes for quick bolognese, and four cheese pasta. Featuring a Tasting Lab on tomato paste.
73	"Pot Roast"	February 21, 2004
Recipes for pot roast with root vegetables, and skillet green beans. Featuring an Equipment Corner covering vegetable choppers and quick tips for de-fatting liquids.
74	"Maple-Glazed Pork Roast"	February 28, 2004
Recipes for maple-glazed pork loin, and wild rice pilaf. Featuring an Equipment Corner covering food storage containers and quick tips for cleaning crusty pans.
75	"Truck Stop Favorites"	March 6, 2004
Recipes for chicken-fried steak with gravy, and coconut cream pie. Featuring a Tasting Lab on Graham crackers and quick tips for whipped cream.
76	"Chicken in a Skillet"	March 13, 2004
Recipes for pan-roasted chicken breasts, and almond-crusted chicken breasts with wilted spinach. Featuring an Equipment Corner covering traditional skillets and quick tips for carving whole chicken.
77	"Chicken in a Pot"	March 20, 2004
Recipes for chicken provençal, and chicken with 40 cloves of garlic. Featuring an Equipment Corner covering kitchen shears and a Tasting Lab on vermouth.
78	"Steak and Potatoes"	March 27, 2004
Recipes for blue cheese mashed potatoes with caramelized onions, and grilled steaks. Featuring an Equipment Corner covering large saucepans, a Tasting Lab on mail order steaks vs. supermarket steaks, and quick tips for charcoal chimneys.
79	"Steak Tips"	April 3, 2004
Recipes for steak tips, and steak fries. Featuring an Equipment Corner covering grill brushes, Food Facts about grills, and quick tips for charcoal chimneys.
80	"Stir-Fry 101"	April 10, 2004
Recipes for stir-fried pork with eggplant, and stir-fried beef and broccoli. Featuring an Equipment Corner covering electric woks and a Tasting Lab on oyster sauce.
81	"Asian Noodles"	April 17, 2004
Recipes for pad thai, and sesame noodles. Featuring an Equipment Corner covering flat-bottomed woks, Food Facts about tamarind, and quick tips for using instant-read thermometers.
82	"Favorite Italian Classics"	April 24, 2004
Recipes for chicken diavola, and Frico strawberries with balsamic vinegar. Featuring a Tasting Lab on balsamic vinegar and quick tips for grilling raw meat plates.
83	"French Food in a Flash"	May 1, 2004
Recipes for simplified cassoulet with pork and kielbasa, and tarte tatin. Featuring a Tasting Lab on diced canned tomatoes.
84	"Tea Time"	May 8, 2004
Recipes for lemon pound cake, and oatmeal scones. Featuring an Equipment Corner covering citrus juicers and reamers, a Tasting Lab on supermarket teas, Food Facts about tea parties, and quick tips for stabilizing mixing bowls.
85	"Sunday Brunch"	May 15, 2004
Recipes for Denver omelet, and classic corn muffins. Featuring an Equipment Corner covering rubber spatulas, a Tasting Lab on baking powder, and quick tips for egg buying.
86	"The Pancakes Show"	May 22, 2004
Recipes for blueberry pancakes, and German apple pancake. Featuring an Equipment Corner covering electric griddles, a Tasting Lab on fresh vs. frozen blueberries, Food Facts about pancakes, and quick tips for keeping pancakes warm.
87	"Cookie Jar Favorites"	May 29, 2004
Recipes for thin and crisp chocolate chip cookies, and coconut macaroons. Featuring an Equipment Corner covering pot holders and a Tasting Lab on refrigerator cookie dough.
88	"Summer Berry Desserts"	June 5, 2004
Recipes for summer berry pie, and berry gratin with sabayon. Featuring an Equipment Corner covering ice cream makers and quick tips for whipping cream.
89	"Easy Sheet Cakes"	June 12, 2004
Recipes for chocolate sheet cake, and carrot cake. Featuring a Tasting Lab on milk chocolate, Food Facts about baking, and quick tips for wrapping frosted cakes.
90	"Lemon Cheesecake"	June 19, 2004
A recipe for lemon cheesecake. Featuring an Equipment Corner covering springform pans, Food Facts about animal crackers, and quick tips for buying lemons.
91	"Showstopper Desserts"	June 26, 2004
Recipes for chocolate mousse cake, and frozen lemon soufflé. Featuring a Tasting Lab on unsweetened chocolate.

== Season 5 (2005) ==
No.	Title	Original release date
92	"Appetizers"	January 1, 2005
Recipes for spiced pecans with rum glaze, pita chips with creamy herb spinach dip, and beef satay with spicy peanut dipping sauce. Featuring an Equipment Corner covering meat cleavers, a Tasting Lab on jarred medium salsa, and quick tips for how to store nuts.
93	"Simple Soups"	January 8, 2005
Recipes for hearty chicken noodle soup, and pasta e faigoli (Italian pasta & bean soup). Featuring an Equipment Corner covering fat separators and quick tips for how to freeze soup and broth.
94	"A Soup Supper"	January 15, 2005
Recipes for quick cheese bread, and hearty lentil soup. Featuring an Equipment Corner covering vegetable peelers, a Tasting Lab on artisanal bacon, quick tips for freezing bacon, and uses for leftover bread.
95	"Regional Classics"	January 22, 2005
Recipes for Creole-style shrimp and sausage gumbo, and Cincinnati chili. Featuring an Equipment Corner covering useful kitchen gadgets and a Tasting Lab on long-grain rice.
96	"Pork Chops and Gravy"	January 29, 2005
Recipes for stuffed pork chops with all-purpose gravy, and glazed carrots. Featuring quick tips for measuring salt content and a Science Desk segment exploring how brining works.
97	"Two Roast Chickens"	February 5, 2005
Recipes for crispy roasted lemon chicken, and chicken under a brick with herb-roasted potatoes. Featuring an Equipment Corner covering countertop rotisseries.
98	"Flash in a Pan"	February 12, 2005
Recipes for chicken paillard (sauteed chicken cutlets with mustard-cider sauce), and pan-seared shrimp with garlic lemon butter. Featuring an Equipment Corner covering cookware cleaners, a Tasting Lab on chicken cutlets, and quick tips for non-alcoholic white wine substitutes.
99	"Family Favorites"	February 19, 2005
Recipes for sweet and tangy oven-barbecued chicken, and classic macaroni and cheese. Featuring an Equipment Corner covering stain removers, a Tasting Lab on microwave popcorn, and quick tips for electric burners.
100	"Restaurant Cooking at Home"	February 26, 2005
Recipes for flambéed pan-roasted lobster, and crab towers with avocado & gazpacho salsa. Featuring quick tips for Flambé-ing 101.
101	"Texas Rib House"	March 5, 2005
Recipes for Texas-style barbecued beef ribs, and Southern-style corn bread. Featuring an Equipment Corner covering cast-iron skillet care, a Tasting Lab on corn bread mixes, and quick tips for setting up charcoal grills.
102	"Grill-Roasted Beef Tenderloin"	March 12, 2005
Recipes for grill-roasted beef tenderloin with salsa verde, and broiled asparagus. Featuring an Equipment Corner covering kitchen gadgets and quick tips for setting up charcoal grills.
103	"New Flavors from the Grill"	March 19, 2005
Recipes for Gai Yang-inspired Thai-style grilled chicken with spicy sweet-and-sour dipping sauce, and grilled salmon with maple-soy glaze. Featuring an Equipment Corner covering portable gas grills and a Science Desk segment exploring the truth about cutting boards and bacteria.
104	"Mexican Favorites"	March 26, 2005
Recipes for chicken enchiladas with red chili sauce, and arroz a la Mexicana (Mexican rice). Featuring an Equipment Corner covering spice grinders.
105	"Quicker Pasta"	April 2, 2005
Recipes for farfalle with tomatoes, olives, and feta; campanelli with asparagus, basil, and balsamic glaze; pasta with arugula, goat cheese, and sun-dried tomato pesto; and penne with toasted nut and parsley pesto. Featuring a Tasting Lab on sun-dried tomatoes.
106	"A Passage to India"	April 9, 2005
Recipes for chicken biryani, and mulligatawny soup. Featuring a Tasting Lab on curry powder.
107	"Pissaladiere"	April 16, 2005
A recipe for Pissaladière (Provençal pizza with onions, anchovies, & olives). Featuring an Equipment Corner covering baking stones and pizza cutters.
108	"In an Italian-American Kitchen"	April 23, 2005
Recipes for eggplant Parmesan; and pasta with chicken, broccoli, and sun-dried tomatoes.
109	"More Italian Classics"	April 30, 2005
Recipes for pasta al'Amatriciana (pasta with tomato, bacon, and onion), and mushroom risotto. Featuring an Equipment Corner covering cheese graters and a Tasting Lab on jarred pasta sauce.
110	"Winter Supper"	May 7, 2005
Recipes for osso buco (braised veal shanks), and simple homemade polenta. Featuring a Tasting Lab on bottled water.
111	"Bistro Classics"	May 14, 2005
Recipes for salad with herbed baked goat cheese and vinaigrette, and french onion soup. Featuring an Equipment Corner covering Santoku knives and a Tasting Lab on goat cheese.
112	"Ultimate Sticky Buns"	May 21, 2005
A recipe for sticky pecan buns. Featuring an Equipment Corner covering innovative coffee makers and a Tasting Lab on supermarket coffee.
113	"Bake Sale Favorites"	May 28, 2005
Recipes for chewy brownies, and congo bars (blondies with coconut and chocolate chips). Featuring an Equipment Corner covering 13x9-inch baking pans and dishes and a Tasting Lab on boxed brownie mixes.
114	"Holiday Cookies"	June 4, 2005
Recipes for butter cookies with cream cheese glaze, and walnut crescent cookies. Featuring an Equipment Corner covering stand mixers and hand mixers.
115	"There's a Hole in Your Cake"	June 11, 2005
Recipes for chocolate sour cream Bundt cake, and angel food cake. Featuring an Equipment Corner covering Bundt pans, and quick tips for wet vs. dry measuring cups.
116	"Pumpkin Cheesecake"	June 18, 2005
A recipe for spiced pumpkin cheesecake with bourbon and brown sugar whipped cream. Featuring a Tasting Lab on cream cheese and quick tips for preventing cracked cheesecakes.
117	"Four-Star Desserts"	June 25, 2005
Recipes for chocolate volcano cake with espresso ice cream, and caramelized pears with blue cheese and black pepper-caramel sauce. Featuring an Equipment Corner covering hand mixers.

== Season 6 (2006) ==
No.	Title	Original release date
118	"Eggs for Brunch"	January 7, 2006
Recipes for asparagus, ham and Gruyère frittata, and quiche lorraine. Featuring a Tasting Lab on supermarket bacon, and quick tips for handling eggs.
119	"Tex-Mex Favorites"	January 14, 2006
Recipes for fresh tomato salsa, homemade quesadillas, and homemade beef tacos. Featuring a Tasting Lab on flour tortillas.
120	"South-of-the-Border Soups"	January 21, 2006
Recipes for black bean soup, and tortilla soup. Featuring an Equipment Corner covering inexpensive chef's knives and a Tasting Lab on chicken broth.
121	"Cooking with Squash"	January 28, 2006
Recipes for butternut squash soup, and butternut squash risotto. Featuring an Equipment Corner covering nutmeg graters.
122	"Dinner on a Dime"	February 4, 2006
Recipes for buttermilk mashed potatoes, and pan-seared cheap steaks with mustard-cream sauce. Featuring an Equipment Corner covering sauciers and steak knife sets and a Tasting Lab on cheap steaks.
123	"One-Skillet Dinners"	February 11, 2006
Recipes for skillet lasagna, and skillet jambalaya. Featuring an Equipment Corner covering celebrity skillets and a Tasting Lab on canned diced tomatoes.
124	"American Classics"	February 18, 2006
Recipes for chicken and dumplings, and Boston baked beans. Featuring an Equipment Corner covering plastic food storage bags and a Science Desk segment exploring how acidity affects cooking beans.
125	"Meat and Potatoes"	February 25, 2006
Recipes for onion-braised beef brisket, and smashed potatoes. Featuring an Equipment Corner covering electric knives.
126	"High-Roast Chicken Dinner"	March 4, 2006
Recipes for crisp-skin high-roast butterflied chicken with potatoes, and pan-roasted asparagus with toasted garlic and Parmesan. Featuring an Equipment Corner covering remote thermometers and a Tasting Lab on whole chickens.
127	"Let's Talk Turkey"	March 11, 2006
Recipes for roasted large 22-pound turkey for a crowd, and candied sweet potato casserole. Featuring an Equipment Corner covering turkey gadgets and fat separators.
128	"Pork Chops and Tenderloin"	March 18, 2006
Recipes for pork chops with vinegar and sweet peppers, and pan-seared oven-roasted pork tenderloins with dried cherry-port sauce. Featuring a Tasting Lab on white wine vinegars.
129	"Fish Steaks 101"	March 25, 2006
Recipes for pan-seared sesame-crusted tuna steaks with ginger soy sauce, and pan-roasted halibut steaks with Chipotle-garlic butter. Featuring an Equipment Corner covering oven mitts and a Tasting Lab on soy sauce.
130	"Seafood Classics"	April 1, 2006
Recipes for fish Meunière with browned butter and lemon, and pan-seared scallops with wilted spinach, watercress and orange salad. Featuring a Tasting Lab on butter alternatives.
131	"Classic Italian Dishes"	April 8, 2006
Recipes for fettuccine alfredo, and beef braised in barolo. Featuring a Tasting Lab on Parmesan cheese and a Science Desk segment exploring how braising works.
132	"Two Curry Traditions"	April 15, 2006
Recipes for shrimp curry with yogurt and peas, and Thai green curry with chicken, broccoli, and mushrooms. Featuring a Tasting Lab on coconut milk and quick tips for preserving ginger.
133	"Asian Chicken Classics"	April 22, 2006
Recipes for chicken teriyaki, and orange chicken. Featuring a Tasting Lab on store-bought teriyaki sauce and quick tips for cooking with rice cookers and cooking oil disposal.
134	"Paella Party"	April 29, 2006
Recipes for sangria, and paella. Featuring an Equipment Corner covering paella pans and a Tasting Lab on olive oil.
135	"Grilled Pizza"	May 6, 2006
A recipe for charcoal-grilled tomato and cheese pizzas with spicy garlic oil. Featuring a Science Desk segment exploring what yeast is and quick tips for starting charcoal with chimney starters.
136	"Grill-Roasted Pork Loin"	May 13, 2006
Recipes for charcoal grill-roasted pork loin, and French potato salad with Dijon mustard and herbs. Featuring an Equipment Corner covering kitchen twine, a Tasting Lab on Dijon mustard, and quick tips for gas grilling vs. charcoal grilling.
137	"Pulled Pork and Cornbread"	May 20, 2006
Recipes for barbecued pulled pork on a charcoal grill, and all-purpose cornbread. Featuring an Equipment Corner covering plastic wrap and liquid measuring cups and a Science Desk segment exploring lighter fluid vs. chimney starting for charcoal grills.
138	"Rethinking Barbecued Chicken"	May 27, 2006
Recipes for barbecued pulled chicken on a charcoal grill, and cabbage and red pepper salad with lime-cumin vinaigrette. Featuring an Equipment Corner covering mini food processors and a Tasting Lab on barbecue sauce.
139	"Summer Fruit Desserts"	June 3, 2006
Recipes for free-form summer fruit tart, and blueberry cobbler. Featuring an Equipment Corner covering food processors and a Science Desk segment exploring great pie crust.
140	"Deep-Dish Apple Pie"	June 10, 2006
A recipe for deep-dish apple pie. Featuring an Equipment Corner covering rolling pins and a Tasting Lab on premium butters.
141	"Cookies"	June 17, 2006
Recipes for spritz cookies, and chocolate oatmeal cookies with pecans and dried cherries. Featuring an Equipment Corner covering cookie presses and quick tips for convection ovens and freezing cookie dough.
142	"Old-Fashioned Birthday Cake"	June 24, 2006
A recipe for classic white layer cake with butter frosting and raspberry-almond filling. Featuring an Equipment Corner covering cake pans and a Tasting Lab on raspberry preserves.
143	"German Chocolate Cake"	July 1, 2006
A recipe for German chocolate cake with coconut-pecan filling. Featuring a Tasting Lab on cocoa powders, a Science Desk segment exploring butter temperature and baking, and quick tips for cake making.

== Season 7 (2007) ==
No.	Title	Original release date
144	"Meatloaf Dinner"	January 6, 2007
Recipes for all-beef meatloaf with ketchup glaze, and skillet-roasted red potatoes with olive oil. Featuring a Tasting Lab on ketchup.
145	"Streamlined Chicken Skillet Suppers"	January 13, 2007
Recipes for skillet chicken and rice with peas and scallions, and skillet chicken with broccoli, ziti, and asiago cheese. Featuring an Equipment Corner covering universal knife block sets and a Tasting Lab on white wine for cooking.
146	"Best Beef Stew"	January 20, 2007
Recipes for carbonnade a la flamande (Belgian beef, beer, and onion stew), and roasted acorn squash with brown sugar. Featuring an Equipment Corner covering paring knives, a Tasting Lab on beer for cooking, a comparison of stovetop and oven-baked stews, and a Science Desk segment exploring microwave power.
147	"Sunday Roast Chicken and Stuffing"	January 27, 2007
Recipes for butterflied roast chicken with stuffing, and sautéed garlic-lemon spinach. Featuring an Equipment Corner covering kitchen shears.
148	"Two Ways with Pork"	February 3, 2007
Recipes for cider-glazed pork chops, and bacon-wrapped pork tenderloin medallions. Featuring an Equipment Corner covering sauté pans.
149	"Faster Family Favorites"	February 10, 2007
Recipes for skillet tamale pie, and skillet chicken pot pie topped with biscuits. Featuring a Tasting Lab on Italian dressing.
150	"Lighter Family Favorites"	February 17, 2007
Recipes for lighter chicken Parmesan with tomato sauce, and lighter macaroni and cheese. Featuring an Equipment Corner covering indoor grills and a Tasting Lab on alternative pasta.
151	"Fish and Chips at Home"	February 24, 2007
A recipe for fish and chips. Featuring an Equipment Corner covering electric deep fryers and a Tasting Lab on low-fat mayonnaise.
152	"Chicken Kiev"	March 3, 2007
Recipes for chicken Kiev, and pan-roasted broccoli. Featuring an Equipment Corner covering cookbook holders and a Tasting Lab on white sandwich bread.
153	"Meat and Potatoes for Company"	March 10, 2007
Recipes for pepper-crusted filet mignon with blue cheese chive butter, and potatoes Lyonnaise. Featuring an Equipment Corner covering cocktail shakers, a Tasting Lab on filet mignon, and Quick Tips for taming peppercorn heat.
154	"Staying in For Chinese Takeout"	March 17, 2007
Recipes for stir-fried chicken and bok choy with crispy noodle cake, and hot and sour soup. Featuring an Equipment Corner covering small non-stick saucepans and a Science Desk segment exploring cornstarch.
155	"Not Your Average Stir-Fry"	March 24, 2007
Recipes for shrimp potstickers, and stir-fried Thai-style beef with chilies and shallots. Featuring an Equipment Corner covering inexpensive nonstick skillets.
156	"More Tex-Mex Favorites"	March 31, 2007
A recipe for huevos rancheros. Featuring an Equipment Corner covering kitchen tongs, a Tasting Lab on refried beans, and Quick Tips for stacking pans.
157	"Even More Italian Classics"	April 7, 2007
A recipe for spaghetti with marinara sauce. Featuring an Equipment Corner covering immersion blenders, a Tasting Lab on canned whole tomatoes, and Quick Tips for freezing stock and wine.
158	"Flambé at Home"	April 14, 2007
Recipes for steak Diane, and crêpes Suzette. Featuring a Tasting Lab on orange liqueurs.
159	"Hearty Eggs for Breakfast"	April 21, 2007
Recipes for scrambled eggs with sausage, sweet peppers, and cheddar cheese; and family sized tomato, bacon, and garlic omelette. Featuring an Equipment Corner covering non-stick spatulas, a Tasting Lab on breakfast sausage links, and a Science Desk segment exploring scrambled eggs.
160	"Summer Cooking"	April 28, 2007
Recipes for charcoal-grilled shrimp skewers, and spice-rubbed picnic chicken. Featuring an Equipment Corner covering grilling skewers and a Tasting Lab on lemonade.
161	"Barbecued Brisket and Corn Fritters"	May 5, 2007
Recipes for charcoal-grilled barbecued beef brisket, and farmstand corn fritters. Featuring an Equipment Corner covering charcoal grills, and a Tasting Lab on hot sauce.
162	"Beer Can Chicken Dinner"	May 12, 2007
Recipes for grill-roasted beer can chicken, and pasta salad with pesto. Featuring an Equipment Corner covering grilling gadgets.
163	"Rainy Day Barbecue"	May 19, 2007
Recipes for oven-barbecued spareribs with quick barbecue sauce, and buttermilk coleslaw. Featuring an Equipment Corner covering grill pans and Quick Tips for a spice rub container.
164	"Strawberry Cream Cake"	May 26, 2007
A recipe for strawberry cream cake. Featuring an Equipment Corner covering standing mixers and Food Facts about the differences between heavy cream and whipping cream.
165	"Dark Chocolate Desserts"	June 2, 2007
Recipes for chocolate cupcakes with vanilla bean buttercream, and dark chocolate mousse. Featuring an Equipment Corner covering inexpensive muffin tins and a Tasting Lab on dark chocolate.
166	"Old-Fashioned Chocolate Cake"	June 9, 2007
A recipe for old-fashioned chocolate layer cake with creamy bittersweet chocolate frosting. Featuring an Equipment Corner covering cake stands, a Tasting Lab on chocolate chips, and Quick Tips for "blooming" chocolate.
167	"Easy Apple Desserts"	June 16, 2007
Recipes for apple brown Betty, and apple strudel. Featuring an Equipment Corner covering silicone pastry brushes.
168	"Favorite Citrus Desserts"	June 23, 2007
Recipes for key lime bars, and lemon Bundt cake. Featuring an Equipment Corner covering non-stick baking sprays and Quick Tips for juicing citrus fruits.
169	"Lighter Cheesecake"	June 30, 2007
A recipe for light New York cheesecake with strawberry topping. Featuring a Tasting Lab on supermarket whole-bean coffee.

== Season 8 (2008) ==
No.	Title	Original release date
170	"Rainy Day BBQ Pork Chops"	January 5, 2008
Recipes for skillet-barbecued pork chops, and creamy macaroni salad. Featuring an Equipment Corner covering chef's knives and a Science Desk segment exploring marinades.
171	"Lemon Layer Cake"	January 12, 2008
A recipe for lemon layer cake. Featuring a Tasting Lab on yellow cake mixes and Quick Tips for baking techniques.
172	"Italian-American Classics"	January 19, 2008
Recipes for baked manicotti, and cheesy garlic bread. Featuring an Equipment Corner covering garlic presses and a Tasting Lab on supermarket Parmesan cheese.
173	"More Cookie Jar Favorites"	January 26, 2008
Recipes for triple-chocolate cookies, and brown sugar cookies. Featuring an Equipment Corner covering inexpensive coffee makers.
174	"Kansas City BBQ"	February 2, 2008
Recipes for charcoal-grilled Kansas City-style sticky ribs, and smoky Kansas City-style barbecue beans. Featuring an Equipment Corner covering barbecue thermometers and a Tasting Lab on pickles.
175	"French Classics"	February 9, 2008
Recipes for modern Coq au Vin (French chicken and red wine stew), and chocolate pots de creme. Featuring an Equipment Corner covering inexpensive dutch ovens and a Science Desk segment exploring how much alcohol evaporates when cooking.
176	"Coffeehouse Treats"	February 16, 2008
Recipes for blueberry scones, and bran muffins. Featuring an Equipment Corner covering commuter coffee mugs and a Tasting Lab on strawberry preserves.
177	"Asian Take-Out at Home"	February 23, 2008
Recipes for Thai-style chicken soup, and stir-fried portobello mushrooms with ginger-oyster sauce. Featuring an Equipment Corner covering soup ladles and a Tasting Lab on soy sauce.
178	"Holiday Beef Tenderloin Dinner"	March 1, 2008
Recipes for roast beef tenderloin with caramelized onion and mushroom stuffing, and creamy mashed potatoes. Featuring an Equipment Corner covering electric knife sharpeners.
179	"Pasta and Tomatoes, Reimagined"	March 8, 2008
Recipes for penne alla vodka (penne in vodka-tomato cream sauce), and pasta caprese (summer pasta with tomatoes, fresh mozzarella, and basil). Featuring an Equipment Corner covering stockpots and a Tasting Lab on penne.
180	"A New Way with Turkey"	March 15, 2008
Recipes for roast salted turkey, and roasted green beans with red onion and walnuts. Featuring an Equipment Corner covering roasting pans and a Tasting Lab on turkey.
181	"White Chicken Chili Supper"	March 22, 2008
Recipes for white chicken chili, and double-corn skillet corn bread. Featuring an Equipment Corner covering cast-iron skillets and a Tasting Lab on tortilla chips.
182	"French Apple Tart"	May 29, 2008
A recipe for apple galette (French apple tart). Featuring an Equipment Corner covering favorite baking equipment, and a Science Desk segment exploring flour and flour types.
183	"More Chicken in a Skillet"	April 5, 2008
Recipes for pan-roasted chicken breasts with potatoes, and Parmesan-crusted chicken cutlets. Featuring an Equipment Corner covering kitchen thermometers and a Science Desk segment exploring cooking with alcohol.
184	"Pizza Party"	April 12, 2008
Recipes for Chicago delivery-style pepperoni pan pizza, and antipasto pasta salad. Featuring an Equipment Corner covering convection toaster ovens and a Tasting Lab on frozen pizzas.
185	"Old-Fashioned Breakfast Cakes"	April 19, 2008
Recipes for Krümelkuchen (New York-style crumb cake), and blueberry boy bait. Featuring an Equipment Corner covering baking pans and a Tasting Lab on hot cocoa.
186	"Bistro Steak Dinner"	April 26, 2008
Recipes for pan-seared thick-cut strip steaks, and garlic and olive oil mashed potatoes. Featuring an Equipment Corner covering slotted spoons, a Science Desk segment exploring how thick-cut steaks stay tender, and Food Facts about salt.
187	"Lightening Up Chocolate Desserts"	May 3, 2008
Recipes for low-fat chocolate mousse, and low-fat brownies. Featuring a Tasting Lab on low-fat vanilla ice cream.
188	"Fish on the Grill"	May 10, 2008
Recipes for charcoal-grilled blackened red snapper, and sweet and saucy charcoal-grilled salmon with lime-Jalapeño glaze. Featuring an Equipment Corner covering barbecue mitts.
189	"Indian Favorites, Simplified"	May 17, 2008
Recipes for korma (Indian-style vegetable curry with potatoes, cauliflower, peas, and chickpeas), and chicken tikka masala. Featuring a Tasting Lab on crushed tomatoes and Quick Tips for organizing spices.
190	"Grilled Cornish Game Hens"	May 24, 2008
Recipes for charcoal grill-roasted Cornish game hens; and rice salad with oranges, olives, and almonds. Featuring an Equipment Corner covering chimney starters, a Tasting Lab on Basmati rice, and Quick Tips for cooking rice.
191	"Easy Skillet Suppers"	May 31, 2008
Recipes for baked ziti in the skillet, and beef stroganoff in the skillet. Featuring an Equipment Corner covering can openers and a Tasting Lab on supermarket extra-virgin olive oil.
192	"Four-Cheese Lasagna"	June 7, 2008
Recipes for four-cheese lasagna, and spicy salad with mustard and balsamic vinaigrette. Featuring an Equipment Corner covering box graters and a Tasting Lab on balsamic vinegar.
193	"Two Ways with Shrimp"	June 14, 2008
Recipes for garlicky shrimp with bread crumbs, and deli-style shrimp salad. Featuring an Equipment Corner covering kitchen timers and a Tasting Lab on canned tuna.
194	"Drive-In Specials"	June 21, 2008
Recipes for oven-fried onion rings, and well-done hamburgers done right. Featuring a Tasting Lab on pre-sliced cheddar cheese and a Science Desk segment exploring dry burgers.
195	"Favorite Slow-Cooker Classics"	June 28, 2008
Recipes for slow-cooker beef burgundy, and Belgian beer-braised short ribs. Featuring an Equipment Corner covering slow-cookers.

== Season 9 (2009) ==
No.	Title	Original release date
196	"The Best Blueberry Pie"	January 3, 2009
Recipes for vodka pie dough, and blueberry pie. Featuring an Equipment Corner covering rimmed baking sheets and a Science Desk segment exploring how vodka pie dough works.
197	"French Classics, Reimagined"	January 10, 2009
Recipes for poulet en cocotte (French chicken in a pot), and soupe à l'oignon (French onion soup). Featuring a Tasting Lab on Gruyère cheese.
198	"Dinner with a Spanish Accent"	January 17, 2009
Recipes for arroz con pollo (Latino-style chicken and rice), and Spanish-style garlic shrimp. Featuring an Equipment Corner covering onion goggles and pie gate.
199	"The Crunchiest Pork Chops Ever"	January 24, 2009
Recipes for crunchy baked pork chops, and apple sauce. Featuring an Equipment Corner covering nonstick skillets and a Tasting lab on Dijon mustard.
200	"Perfecting Pasta Sauces"	January 31, 2009
Recipes for simple but authentic Italian meat sauce, and pasta with creamy three-way tomato sauce. Featuring a Tasting Lab on supermarket extra-virgin olive oil and Quick Tips for how to use panades.
201	"More Easy Apple Desserts"	February 7, 2009
Recipes for apple pie in a skillet, and applesauce snack cake. Featuring an Equipment Corner covering automatic drip coffee makers.
202	"One Great Thanksgiving"	February 14, 2009
Recipes for herb-roasted turkey with gravy, and traditional mashed potatoes. Featuring an Equipment Corner covering potato ricers and a Science Desk segment exploring how starch affects texture in mashed potatoes.
203	"Soups of the Day"	February 21, 2009
Recipes for beef and vegetable soup, and ribollita (Tuscan bean stew). Featuring a Science Desk segment exploring glutamates and Quick Tips for brining beans.
204	"Bringing Home Italian Favorites"	February 28, 2009
Recipes for saltimbocca (chicken with prosciutto and sage), and tiramisù (ladyfinger cake with espresso and mascaparone cheese). Featuring an Equipment Corner covering refrigerator and freezer thermometers and a Tasting Lab on prosciutto.
205	"Everyone's Favorite Cake"	March 7, 2009
A recipe for fluffy yellow cake layered with chocolate buttercream frosting. Featuring a Tasting Lab on dark chocolate.
206	"Resurrecting the Roast Beef Dinner"	March 14, 2009
Recipes for slow-roasted beef with horseradish cream sauce, and root vegetable-flavored mashed potatoes. Featuring an Equipment Corner covering meat-probe thermometers and Quick Tips for salting meat.
207	"South-of-the-Border Supper"	March 21, 2009
Recipes for enchiladas verdes (enchiladas with New Mexican green chili sauce), and steak tacos with sweet and spicy pickled onions. Featuring an Equipment Corner covering silicone spatulas and a Tasting Lab on jarred hot salsa.
208	"Lunchtime Specials"	March 28, 2009
Recipes for pizza bianca (baked pizza dough topped with rosemary), and creamless "creamy" tomato soup with homemade croutons. Featuring an Equipment Corner covering digital weight scales.
209	"Fish Made Easy"	April 4, 2009
Recipes for water-poached salmon with herb and caper vinaigrette, and crunchy oven-fried fish with sweet and tangy tartar sauce. Featuring an Equipment Corner covering mandolines.
210	"A Grand, Sweet Finale"	April 11, 2009
Recipes for chocolate soufflé, and Grand Marnier soufflé. Featuring an Equipment Corner covering all-purpose balloon whisks and a Science Desk segment exploring soufflés.
211	"Holiday Ham and Biscuits"	April 18, 2009
Recipes for glazed spiral-sliced ham, and drop biscuits. Featuring an Equipment Corner covering cutting boards, a Tasting Lab on orange marmalade, and a Science Desk segment exploring bacteria on cutting boards.
212	"Let's Do Chinese"	April 25, 2009
Recipes for lo mein (pork and noodle stir fry), and teriyaki-style beef stir fry with green beans and shiitake mushrooms. Featuring an Equipment Corner covering rice cookers.
213	"Pork on the Grill"	May 2, 2009
Recipes for grilled pork loin with apple-cranberry filling on a charcoal grill, and sautéed baby spinach with almonds and golden raisins. Featuring a Tasting Lab on artisanal bacon.
214	"Old-Fashioned Snack Cakes"	May 9, 2009
Recipes for spice cake with cream cheese frosting, and oatmeal cake with broiled icing. Featuring an Equipment Corner covering dry measuring cups and Quick Tips for removing gumminess.
215	"Backyard Steak and Potatoes"	May 16, 2009
Recipes for grilled flank steak with garlic-shallot-rosemary marinade, and charcoal-grilled potatoes with garlic and rosemary. Featuring an Equipment Corner covering silicone spatulas and a Tasting Lab on mail-order porterhouse steaks.
216	"Grilled Rack of Lamb Dinner"	May 23, 2009
Recipes for charcoal-grilled rack of lamb with garlic and herbs, and summer vegetable gratin. Featuring an Equipment Corner covering broiler-safe gratin dishes.
217	"Four-Star Stuffed Chicken Breasts"	May 30, 2009
Recipes for French-style stuffed chicken breasts, and green beans amandine. Featuring an Equipment Corner covering meat pounders and a Tasting Lab on black peppercorns.
218	"Breadmaking, Simplified"	June 6, 2009
Recipes for bread for beginners, and Irish soda bread in a skillet. Featuring an Equipment Corner covering serrated knives and a Science Desk segment exploring kneading and autolysis.
219	"Weeknight Summer Supper"	June 13, 2009
Recipes for charcoal-grilled bone-in chicken breasts, and Greek-style cherry tomato salad. Featuring an Equipment Corner covering solar cookers.
220	"French Country Cooking"	June 20, 2009
Recipes for Daube Provençal (Provençal beef stew with olives, thyme, and cabernet), and traditional meringue cookies. Featuring an Equipment Corner covering pastry bags and a Science Desk segment exploring the twin stabilizers sugar and cornstarch.
221	"Puddings—from Simple to Spectacular"	June 27, 2009
Recipes for crème caramel (lightweight French custard with liquid caramel topping), and stove-top rice pudding with cinnamon and dried fruit. Featuring an Equipment Corner covering electric tea kettles.

== Season 10 (2010) ==
No.	Title	Original release date
222	"Triple-Chocolate Mousse Cake"	January 2, 2010
A recipe for triple-chocolate mousse cake. Featuring an Equipment Corner covering innovative teapots and a Tasting Lab on white chocolate.
223	"Chicken Classics, Reinvented"	January 9, 2010
Recipes for stovetop chicken noodle soup, and extra-crispy roasted chicken. Featuring a Tasting Lab on vegetable broth and a Science Desk segment exploring crisping chicken skin.
224	"Best Weekend Breakfast"	January 16, 2010
Recipes for blueberry muffins, and French omelets. Featuring an Equipment Corner covering omelet pans and Quick Tips for using frozen butter.
225	"Classic Beef Braises"	January 23, 2010
Recipes for goulash (Hungarian beef stew), and braised beef short ribs. Featuring a Tasting Lab on sweet paprika.
226	"Pork Two Ways"	January 30, 2010
Recipes for pan-seared thick-cut pork chops, and maple-glazed pork tenderloin. Featuring an Equipment Corner covering portable induction burners, electric citrus juicers, cut-resistant gloves, and electric egg cookers.
227	"The Cookie Jar"	February 6, 2010
Recipes for perfect chocolate chip cookies, and sablés (French butter cookies). Featuring a Tasting Lab on milk chocolate chips and dark chocolate chips.
228	"Saucy Italian Favorites"	February 13, 2010
Recipes for pesto alla trapanese (pasta with tomato and almond pesto), and Sunday gravy (Italian-American meat sauce). Featuring an Equipment Corner covering blenders and Food Facts about panades.
229	"Making Meat and Potatoes for Company"	February 20, 2010
Recipes for traditional oven-roasted beef tenderloin, and aligot (mashed potatoes with cheese and garlic). Featuring an Equipment Corner covering slicing knives and Quick Tips for processing potatoes.
230	"Rolls and Loaves"	February 27, 2010
Recipes for multigrain bread, and rustic dinner rolls.
231	"Egg Dishes with an Accent"	March 6, 2010
Recipes for French onion and bacon tart, and tortilla (Spanish omelet with roasted red peppers and peas). Featuring an Equipment Corner covering electric wine openers.
232	"Sensational Skillet Recipes"	March 13, 2010
Recipes for stove-top roasted chicken with lemon-herb sauce, and skillet lemon soufflé. Featuring an Equipment Corner covering inexpensive citrus juicers.
233	"An Austrian Supper"	March 20, 2010
Recipes for pork schnitzel (breaded pork cutlets), and Kartoffelsalat (Austrian potato salad). Featuring an Equipment Corner covering traditional skillets and wine aerators.
234	"Who Wants Pasta?"	March 27, 2010
Recipes for garlicky shrimp pasta, and baked ziti. Featuring an Equipment Corner covering cookware sets and a Tasting Lab on cottage cheese.
235	"An Old-Fashioned Thanksgiving"	April 3, 2010
Recipes for slow-roasted turkey with gravy, and pumpkin pie. Featuring a Tasting Lab on cinnamon.
236	"Coconut Layer Cake"	April 10, 2010
A recipe for coconut layer cake. Featuring a Tasting Lab on premium butter and Quick Tips for cake baking.
237	"Salmon—Indoors and Out"	April 17, 2010
Recipes for gas-grilled salmon fillets, and oven-roasted salmon. Featuring a Tasting Lab on California extra-virgin olive oil and a Science Desk segment exploring why fish sticks.
238	"Italian Bread and Sauce"	April 24, 2010
Recipes for ciabatta, and homemade tomato sauce. Featuring an Equipment Corner covering bowl scrapers.
239	"Great Glazed Chicken"	May 1, 2010
Recipes for roasted broccoli with (optional) garlic, and glaze-roasted chicken using a vertical roaster. Featuring an Equipment Corner covering vertical roasters and mini prep bowls.
240	"Chicken and Rice—Indian-Style"	May 8, 2010
Recipes for Tandoori chicken without a tandoor, and homemade rice pilaf. Featuring an Equipment Corner covering boning knives.
241	"All-Time Cookie Favorites"	May 15, 2010
Recipes for chewy chocolate cookies, and salty thin and crispy oatmeal cookies. Featuring an Equipment Corner covering environmentally-friendly skillets and a Tasting Lab on oats.
242	"Supper From South of the Border"	May 22, 2010
Recipes for carnitas (Mexican pulled pork), and Mexican-style charcoal-grilled corn. Featuring an Equipment Corner covering corn strippers.
243	"Best Burgers and Fries"	May 29, 2010
Recipes for drive-in style cheeseburgers, and shortcut Yukon gold french fries. Featuring an Equipment Corner covering electric deep fryers, Quick Tips for handling meat, and a Science Desk segment exploring cold oil frying.
244	"The Italian Grill"	June 5, 2010
Recipes for pollo al mattone (Sicilian chicken grilled under a brick), and braciole (grilled and stuffed flank steak pinwheels). Featuring an Equipment Corner covering grill presses and a Tasting Lab on provolone cheese.
245	"Classic Asian Appetizers"	June 12, 2010
Recipes for shrimp tempura (Japanese-style fried shrimp) using home kitchen techniques, and Thai pork lettuce wraps. Featuring an Equipment Corner covering mortars and pestles and a Tasting Lab on mirin (Japanese rice vinegar).
246	"Turkey on the Grill"	June 19, 2010
Recipes for charcoal grill-roasted boneless turkey breast, and crisp roasted potatoes. Featuring an Equipment Corner covering grill cookware for vegetables.
247	"Old-Fashioned Fruit Desserts"	June 26, 2010
Recipes for apple upside-down cake, and individual berry gratins. Featuring an Equipment Corner covering apple slicers and a Tasting Lab on vanilla extract.

== Season 11 (2011) ==
No.	Title	Original release date
248	"Old-Fashioned Sunday Dinners"	January 8, 2011
Recipes for traditional pot roast, and chicken pot pie with savory crumble topping. Featuring an Equipment Corner covering food storage containers and a Science Desk segment exploring the science of brining poultry.
249	"Desserts with an English Accent"	January 15, 2011
Recipes for traditional bread pudding, and traditional shortbread. Featuring an Equipment Corner covering best small appliances and a Science Desk segment exploring differences between stale bread and dried bread.
250	"Tostadas and Empanadas"	January 22, 2011
Recipes for beef empanadas, and tinga (spicy shredded pork tostadas).
251	"Chewy Brownies and Chocolate Cupcakes"	January 29, 2011
Recipes for chewy brownies, and chocolate cupcakes with ganache filling. Featuring an Equipment Corner covering baking gadgets.
252	"Italian Comfort Classics"	February 5, 2011
Recipes for chicken Canzanese (chicken braised in white wine and garlic), and creamy Parmesan polenta. Featuring an Equipment Corner covering kitchen gadget favorites.
253	"Fall Favorites"	February 12, 2011
Recipes for slow-roasted pork shoulder with peach sauce, and baked apples. Featuring an Equipment Corner covering inexpensive instant-read thermometers.
254	"Seafood in a Skillet"	February 19, 2011
Recipes for pan-seared scallops, and skillet-roasted fish fillets. Featuring an Equipment Corner covering inexpensive nonstick skillets and a Science Desk segment exploring the difference between caramelizing and browning.
255	"Coffee Break Sweets"	February 26, 2011
Recipes for banana bread, and cream cheese-stuffed coffee cake. Featuring an Equipment Corner covering adjustable electric kettles.
256	"Dutch Oven Classics"	February 26, 2011
Recipes for beef stew, and chicken and dumplings. Featuring a Tasting Lab on beef broth.
257	"Asian Favorites at Home"	March 5, 2011
Recipes for Thai-style ground chicken with basil, and Shu Mai (steamed Chinese dumplings). Featuring an Equipment Corner covering large saucepans.
258	"Southern Fare Reinvented"	March 12, 2011
Recipes for indoor pulled pork with sweet and tangy barbecue sauce, and simplified fried chicken. Featuring an Equipment Corner covering electric pressure cookers and a Science Desk segment exploring salting milk.
259	"Stuffed Beef Tenderloin"	March 19, 2011
Recipes for horseradish-crusted beef tenderloin, and roasted carrots. Featuring an Equipment Corner covering the Jamie Oliver flavour shaker and a Tasting Lab on horseradish and vegetable oil.
260	"Sweet Endings"	March 26, 2011
Recipes for chewy sugar cookies, and berry fool. Featuring an Equipment Corner covering innovative mixing bowls.
261	"Weeknight Workhorses"	April 2, 2011
Recipes for pan-seared chicken breasts with lemon and chive pan sauce, and sautéed pork cutlets with mustard-cider sauce. Featuring an Equipment Corner covering meat pounders and fire extinguishers.
262	"Thanksgiving Turkey"	April 9, 2011
A recipe for old fashioned stuffed turkey and gravy. Featuring an Equipment Corner covering hybrid chef's knives and a Science Desk segment exploring staling bread.
263	"Easier Italian Favorites"	April 16, 2011
Recipes for hearty minstrone, and simplified risotto with Parmesan and herbs. Featuring an Equipment Corner covering vacuum robots.
264	"Steak Frites"	April 23, 2011
Recipes for steak frites (rib-eye with french fries), and traditional French vinaigrette. Featuring an Equipment Corner covering metal and plastic spatulas.
265	"Shrimp in a Skillet"	April 30, 2011
Recipes for shrimp saganaki (Greek-style shrimp with tomatoes and feta), and hot and sour stir-fried shrimp with snow peas and red bell peppers. Featuring a Tasting Lab on feta cheese and a Science Desk segment exploring muscle in fish vs. muscle in meat.
266	"Deep-Dish Pizza"	May 7, 2011
Recipes for Chicago-style deep-dish pizza, and Mediterranean chopped salad.
267	"All-American Fruit Desserts"	May 14, 2011
Recipes for sweet cherry pie, and skillet apple crisp. Featuring an Equipment Corner covering ice cream scoops and a Tasting Lab on supermarket vanilla ice cream.
268	"Grilled Pork Chops and Ribs"	May 21, 2011
Recipes for charcoal-grilled Memphis-style barbecued spareribs, and charcoal grill-smoked pork chops. Featuring an Equipment Corner covering new grill gadgets.
269	"Simply Italian"	May 28, 2011
Recipes for rosemary focaccia, and cacio e pepe (spaghetti with pecorino romano and black pepper). Featuring a Tasting Lab on whole-wheat pasta.
270	"Great Grilled Roast Beef"	June 4, 2011
Recipes for charcoal grill-roasted beef with garlic and rosemary, and roasted smashed potatoes. Featuring an Equipment Corner covering smokers and a Science Desk segment exploring brining.
271	"Summertime Supper Fare"	June 11, 2011
Recipes for charcoal-grilled stuffed chicken breasts with prosciutto and fontina, and charcoal-grilled tuna steaks with red wine vinegar and mustard vinaigrette. Featuring an Equipment Corner covering summer gadgets.
272	"Grilled Steak and Gazpacho"	June 18, 2011
Recipes for charcoal-grilled Argentine steaks with chimichurri sauce, and creamy gazpacho andaluz. Featuring a Tasting Lab on canned diced tomatoes.
273	"Lazy Day Breakfast"	June 25, 2011
Recipes for buttermilk waffles, and french toast. Featuring an Equipment Corner covering waffle irons and a Science Desk segment exploring baking soda and browning.

== Season 12 (2012) ==
No.	Title	Original release date
274	"Simply Chicken"	January 7, 2012
Recipes for chicken fricassée (chicken braised in cream sauce and vegetables), and simple roast chicken without brining or salting. Featuring an Equipment Corner covering wooden cutting boards and a Science Desk segment exploring emulsification.
275	"Fall Classics"	January 14, 2012
Recipes for enchaud perigordine (French-style pot-roasted pork loin), and classic gingerbread cake. Featuring a Tasting Lab on premium pork and a Science Desk segment exploring the differences between baking soda and baking powder.
276	"Rise and Shine Breakfast"	January 21, 2012
Recipes for perfect scrambled eggs, and cranberry-pecan muffins. Featuring an Equipment Corner covering toaster ovens, a Tasting Lab on peanut butter, and a Science Desk segment exploring the science of scrambled eggs.
277	"Chocolate Torte"	January 28, 2012
A recipe for chocolate-raspberry torte (inspired by Austrian sachertorte). Featuring an Equipment Corner covering manual nut choppers and a Tasting Lab on unsweetened chocolate.
278	"Pasta, Please"	February 4, 2012
Recipes for classic spaghetti and meatballs for a crowd, and pasta primavera (Spring vegetable pasta). Featuring an Equipment Corner covering the Sous Vide machine.
279	"A Slow and Easy Thanksgiving"	February 11, 2012
Recipes for braised turkey with gravy, and bread stuffing with sausage, dried cherries, and pecans. Featuring an Equipment Corner covering oven thermometers.
280	"A Latin Celebration"	February 18, 2012
Recipes for pollo a la brasa (Peruvian roast chicken with garlic and lime), and moros y cristianos (Cuban-style black beans and rice). Featuring an Equipment Corner covering vertical roasters and a Tasting Lab on brown rice.
281	"New York-Style Pizza at Home"	February 25, 2012
A recipe for New York-style thin-crust pizza. Featuring a Tasting Lab on red wine vinegars.
282	"Shake and Bake Reinvented"	March 3, 2012
Recipes for nut-crusted chicken cutlets with lemon and thyme, and crispy pan-fried pork chops. Featuring an Equipment Corner covering food processors.
283	"Here's the Beef"	March 10, 2012
Recipes for Test Kitchen's favorite chili, and pub-style burgers with shallots and blue cheese. Featuring an Equipment Corner covering meat grinders.
284	"Crepes and Croissants"	March 17, 2012
Recipes for croissants, and crepes with sugar and lemon.
285	"Salmon and Sole"	March 24, 2012
Recipes for salmon with soy-mustard glaze, and baked sole fillets with herbs and bread crumbs. Featuring a Tasting Lab on canned tuna.
286	"Soup and Bread from Scratch"	March 31, 2012
Recipes for whole-wheat sandwich bread, and broccoli-cheddar cheese soup. Featuring an Equipment Corner covering Pullman loaf pans, a Tasting Lab on whole wheat flour, and a Science Desk segment exploring the problems with whole wheat flour.
287	"A Moroccan Feast"	April 7, 2012
Recipes for chicken tagine (Moroccan chicken with olives and lemon), and homemade couscous. Featuring an Equipment Corner covering compost buckets and steamer baskets.
288	"Vegetarian Pasta Night"	April 14, 2012
Recipes for vegetable lasagna, and spaghetti al limone (spaghetti with lemon and olive oil). Featuring a Tasting Lab on whole wheat lasagna noodles and a Science Desk segment exploring cornstarch.
289	"Cool and Creamy Desserts"	April 21, 2012
Recipes for creamy chocolate pudding, and homemade vanilla ice cream. Featuring an Equipment Corner covering ice cream makers and a Tasting Lab on vanilla beans.
290	"Backyard Chicken Dinner"	April 28, 2012
Recipes for grill-smoked chicken, and salt-baked potatoes with roasted garlic and rosemary butter. Featuring an Equipment Corner covering outdoor coolers.
291	"Slow-Cooker Revolution"	May 5, 2012
Recipes for slow-cooker chicken noodle soup, slow-cooker pork loin with cranberries and orange, and slow-cooker chocolate-hazelnut bread pudding. Featuring an Equipment Corner covering slow cookers.
292	"Mediterranean Specials"	May 12, 2012
Recipes for grilled beef and vegetable kebabs, and spanakopita (Greek spinach and feta pie). Featuring a Tasting Lab on nonfat Greek yogurt.
293	"Cold-Weather Comfort"	May 19, 2012
Recipes for easy caramel cake, and split peas and ham soup.
294	"Gnocchi and Panzanella"	May 26, 2012
Recipes for potato gnocchi with browned butter and sage, and panzanella (Italian bread salad with tomatoes and basil). Featuring an Equipment Corner covering rotary graters.
295	"Time to Grill"	June 2, 2012
Recipes for grilled bone-in pork roast, and grilled scallops. Featuring an Equipment Corner covering grilling baskets for whole fish, salt containers, beverage carbonators, steamer lids, and frozen ice pop makers.
296	"Sweet Summer Endings"	June 9, 2012
Recipes for fresh strawberry pie, and summer peach cake. Featuring an Equipment Corner covering paring knives and a Science Desk segment exploring vodka in pie dough.
297	"Southeast Asian Favorites"	June 16, 2012
Recipes for nasi goreng (Indonesian-style fried rice), and nuea yang nam tok (Thai grilled-beef salad). Featuring an Equipment Corner covering smoker boxes.
298	"Summertime Supper"	June 23, 2012
Recipes for grilled pork tenderloin stuffed with olive and sun-dried tomatoes, and corn chowder. Featuring an Equipment Corner covering liquid measuring cups.
299	"Bistro-Style Steak and Potatoes"	June 30, 2012
Recipes for pan-seared steak with herb sauce, and potato galette. Featuring an Equipment Corner covering wine openers.

== Season 13 (2013) ==
No.	Title	Original release date
300	"Meat and Potatoes à la Francaise"	January 5, 2013
Recipes for enchaud perigordine (French-style pot-roasted pork loin), and potatoes boulangere (potato casserole with bacon and caramelized onion). Featuring an Equipment Corner covering block knife sets and mandoline.
301	"Great American Classics"	January 12, 2013
Recipes for peanut butter sandwich cookies, and carrot layer cake for guests. Featuring an Equipment Corner covering springform pans.
302	"A Taste of Spain"	January 19, 2013
Recipes for escofat de bou (Catalan beef stew with mushrooms), and fideuà (Spanish-style toasted pasta with shrimp). Featuring a Tasting Lab on supermarket spaghetti.
303	"Simple & Satisfying Vegetable Mains"	January 26, 2013
Recipes for mushroom and leek galette with gorgonzola, and farmhouse vegetable and barley soup. Featuring an Equipment Corner covering vegetable cleavers.
304	"Pork Chops and Lentil Salad"	February 2, 2013
Recipes for pork chops braised in red wine; and lentil salad with olives, mint, and feta. Featuring Quick Tips for storing, chopping, and handling fresh herbs, and a Science Desk segment exploring braising.
305	"Ultimate Italian"	February 9, 2013
Recipes for fresh pasta without a machine (served with olive oil, anchovies, and parsley), and ragu alla bolognese (six-meat sauce with pappardelle). Featuring a Tasting Lab on supermarket mozzarella.
306	"Irish Comfort Classics"	February 16, 2013
Recipes for shepherd's pie, and New England-style corned beef and cabbage. Featuring an Equipment Corner covering quirky kitchen gadgets.
307	"Two Ways with Fish"	February 23, 2013
Recipes for olive oil-poached fish fillets with sherry-tomato vinaigrette, and skillet salmon cakes. Featuring an Equipment Corner covering oyster knives, a Tasting Lab on oyster crackers, and a Science Desk segment exploring oil-poaching.
308	"Big, Bold Chicken Braises"	March 2, 2013
Recipes for chicken marbella (chicken browned with prunes, olives, capers, and garlic), and Filipino-style chicken adobo with coconut milk. Featuring a Tasting lab on whole roasted chickens.
309	"Spicy Fall Sweets"	March 9, 2013
Recipes for pumpkin bread, and gingersnaps. Featuring a Tasting Lab on molasses and a Science Desk segment exploring why too much baking soda leads to crispier cookies.
310	"Company's Coming"	March 16, 2013
Recipes for prime rib, and roasted brussels sprouts. Featuring a Tasting Lab on unsalted butter.
311	"Breakfast Standbys"	March 23, 2013
Recipes for 10-minute steel cut oatmeal, and home fries. Featuring an Equipment Corner covering moka pots.
312	"Turkey on the Grill"	March 30, 2013
Recipes for grill-roasted turkey, and cranberry chutney with apple and crystallized ginger. Featuring an Equipment Corner covering all-purpose spray cleaners and Quick Tips for taking the temperature of turkey.
313	"Chicken Classics, Improved"	April 6, 2013
Recipes for skillet chicken fajitas, and Waldorf chicken salad. Featuring an Equipment Corner covering pizza pans and Espresso presses, and a Tasting Lab on flour tortillas.
314	"Great Italian Pasta Sauces"	April 13, 2013
Recipes for pasta al'Amatriciana (spaghetti with guanciale, tomato, chili, and pecorino), and mushroom ragu (spaghetti with mushroom and tomato sauce). Featuring an Equipment Corner covering box graters and a Tasting Lab on canned whole tomatoes.
315	"Asian Takeout Favorites"	April 20, 2013
Recipes for yu shiang (Sichuan-style pork in garlic sauce), and pad see ew (Thai-style stir-fried noodles with chicken and broccoli). Featuring an Equipment Corner covering blenders.
316	"Spicing Up the Grill"	April 27, 2013
Recipes for tacos al pastor (tacos with grilled pork marinated in guajillo chili sauce), and Jamaican-style jerk chicken. Featuring an Equipment Corner covering grilling tools and mortar and pestles.
317	"Perfecting Summer Classics"	May 4, 2013
Recipes for grilled steaks with New Mexican chili dry rub, and raspberry sorbet. Featuring an Equipment Corner covering ice cream machines and cone makers, a Tasting Lab on hot sauces, and a Science Desk segment exploring ice crystallization in sorbet.
318	"Rethinking Seafood Classics"	May 11, 2013
Recipes for crab cakes bound in shrimp mousse, and grill-smoked salmon. Featuring an Equipment Corner covering seafood scissors and a Tasting Lab on supermarket crab meat.
319	"Skewered and Wrapped"	May 18, 2013
Recipes for beef satay (grilled flank steak skewers basted with lemongrass, ginger, coconut milk, and fish sauce), and sung choi bao (Chinese chicken lettuce wraps). Featuring an Equipment Corner covering sauté pans.
320	"Short Ribs and Chops Hit the Grill"	May 25, 2013
Recipes for grilled boneless pork chops, and grill-roasted beef short ribs. Featuring an Equipment Corner covering pressure cookers and summertime gadgets.
321	"Indian Classics Made Easy"	June 1, 2013
Recipes for naan (Indian flatbread), and saang paneer (Indian-style spinach with fresh cheese). Featuring an Equipment Corner covering electric juicers and knife storage.
322	"Ultimate Grilled Turkey Burgers"	June 8, 2013
Recipes for grilled turkey burgers, and potato burger buns. Featuring an Equipment Corner covering oil misters and a Tasting Lab on artisanal cheddar cheese.
323	"Chili and Stew Go Vegetarian"	June 15, 2013
Recipes for vegetarian chili, and ciambotta (Italian vegetable stew). Featuring an Equipment Corner covering vegetable peelers.
324	"French Sweets, Refined and Rustic"	June 22, 2013
Recipes for chocolate truffles coated in cocoa powder, and French apple cake. Featuring a Tasting Lab on cocoa powder.
325	"Sunday Brunch"	June 29, 2013
Recipes for cinnamon swirl bread, and baked eggs Florentine. Featuring an Equipment Corner covering pancake dispensers and a Science Desk segment exploring properly baked eggs.

== Season 14 (2014) ==
No.	Title	Original release date
326	"Meat and Potatoes with Panache"	January 4, 2014
Recipes for modern beef burgundy using new oven techniques, and braised red potatoes with lemon and chives. Featuring an Equipment Corner covering potato ricers and a Science Desk segment exploring potato starch.
327	"A Fancy Finale"	January 11, 2014
A recipe for chocolate-espresso dacquoise. Featuring a Science Desk segment exploring the effect of sugar on whipped egg whites.
328	"Three Ways with Eggs"	January 18, 2014
Recipes for soft-cooked eggs, fluffy omelet, and perfect fried eggs. Featuring an Equipment Corner covering egg toppers.
329	"A Modern Take on Pizza and Grilled Cheese"	January 25, 2014
Recipes for thin-crust whole-wheat pizza with garlic oil, three cheeses, and basil; and grown-up grilled cheese sandwiches with cheddar and shallot. Featuring an Equipment Corner covering baking peels and baking steels and a Tasting Lab on goat cheese.
330	"French-Style Dutch Oven Dinners"	February 1, 2014
Recipes for poule au pot (French-style chicken and stuffing in a pot), and potée (French-style pork stew).
331	"From an Italian Bakery"	February 8, 2014
Recipes for Florentine lace cookies, and almond biscotti. Featuring a Tasting Lab on supermarket medium-roast coffee.
332	"Salmon and Latkes"	February 15, 2014
Recipes for herb-crusted salmon, and crispy potato latkes. Featuring an Equipment Corner covering stovetop smokers.
333	"Classic Italian Fare"	February 22, 2014
Recipes for chicken Parmesan, and pasta alla norcina (orecchiette with homemade sausage and cream sauce). Featuring an Equipment Corner covering cheese storage wraps and parchment cooking bags.
334	"Revisiting Julia Child's Roast Turkey"	March 1, 2014
Recipes for Julia Child's stuffed turkey, and roasted root vegetables. Featuring an Equipment Corner covering the ultimate turkey rack.
335	"Decadent Desserts"	March 8, 2014
Recipes for rich chocolate tart, and butterscotch pudding. Featuring an Equipment Corner covering butter keepers and peanut butter mixers.
336	"Special-Occasion Roasts"	March 15, 2014
Recipes for pepper-encrusted beef tenderloin, and butterflied leg of lamb with coriander, cumin, and mustard seeds. Featuring an Equipment Corner covering pepper mills.
337	"Let's Start with Soup"	March 22, 2014
Recipes for wild rice and mushroom soup, and cauliflower soup. Featuring a Tasting Lab on wild rice.
338	"It's Pasta Night!"	March 29, 2014
Recipes for spaghetti carbonara, and campanelle alla puttanesca (pasta with olives, capers, tomatoes, and anchovies). Featuring a Tasting Lab on pimento-stuffed green olives and a Science Desk segment exploring how starch affects egg protein.
339	"Oatmeal Muffins and Granola"	April 5, 2014
Recipes for oatmeal muffins, and almond granola with dried fruit. Featuring an Equipment Corner covering automatic-drip coffee makers.
340	"Hearty Spanish and Italian Soups, Revamped"	April 12, 2014
Recipes for wedding soup (Italian-American soup with meatballs and kale), and sopa de lentejas (Spanish-style lentil and chorizo soup). Featuring a Tasting Lab on chicken broth.
341	"Great American Sandwiches"	April 19, 2014
Recipes for philly cheesesteaks, and New England lobster roll. Featuring an Equipment Corner covering scrub brushes and knife sharpeners.
342	"At the Seafood Counter"	April 26, 2014
Recipes for garlicky roasted shrimp with parsley and anise, and oven-steamed mussels. Featuring an Equipment Corner covering lightweight cast-iron skillets and dutch ovens.
343	"Elegant Brunch Favorites"	May 3, 2014
Recipes for no-knead brioche, and lemon ricotta pancakes. Featuring an Equipment Corner covering brioche pans and a Tasting Lab on supermarket bacon.
344	"Spiced-Up Cuban Cuisine"	May 10, 2014
Recipes for picadillo (Cuban-style beef and pork hash), and vaca frita (Cuban-style shredded beef). Featuring an Equipment Corner covering tortilla presses.
345	"Best Barbecued Chicken and Cornbread"	May 17, 2014
Recipes for sweet and tangy barbecued chicken, and cornbread with fresh corn. Featuring a Tasting Lab on high-end barbecue sauces.
346	"Easy Summer Supper"	May 24, 2014
Recipes for grilled lemon chicken with rosemary, and beets with lemon and almonds. Featuring an Equipment Corner covering non-stick skillets and saucepans.
347	"Quick and Easy Rib Dinner"	May 31, 2014
Recipes for grilled and glazed baby back ribs, and grilled corn with basil and lemon butter. Featuring an Equipment Corner covering charcoal grills.
348	"Summertime Desserts"	June 7, 2014
Recipes for summer berry trifle, and fresh peach pie.
349	"Grilled and Glazed"	June 14, 2014
Recipes for grilled and glazed pork tenderloin, and grilled and glazed boneless skinless chicken breasts. Featuring an Equipment Corner covering chef's knives.
350	"Grilling Goes International"	June 21, 2014
Recipes for kofte (skewered and grilled ground lamb with pine nuts and spices), and mechouia (Tunisian-style grilled vegetables). Featuring an Equipment Corner covering skewers and a Tasting Lab on supermarket hummus.
351	"Sweet American Classics"	June 28, 2014
Recipes for lemon chiffon pie, and marbled blueberry bundt cake. Featuring an Equipment Corner covering new coffee gadgets.

== Season 15 (2015) ==
No.	Title	Original release date
352	"Comfort Food Revisited"	January 3, 2015
Recipes for best chicken stew, and cream cheese brownies. Featuring an Equipment Corner covering 13x9-inch baking pans.
353	"Almond Cake and British Scones"	January 10, 2015
Recipes for British-style currant scones, and best almond cake. Featuring a Tasting Lab on orange juice.
354	"Pork Tenderloin Dinner"	January 17, 2015
Recipes for broiled pork tenderloin, and rice and lentils with crispy onions (mujaddara). Featuring an Equipment Corner covering wine savers.
355	"Beefing Up Mexican Favorites"	January 24, 2015
Recipes for Mexican-style grilled steak (carne asada), and shredded beef tacos (carne deshebrada). Featuring a Tasting Lab on dark chocolate.
356	"Pasta Rustica"	January 31, 2015
Recipes for rigatoni with beef and onion ragu; and pasta with pesto, potatoes, and green beans. Featuring an Equipment Corner covering colanders and a Tasting Lab on canned white beans.
357	"Sweet on Custard and Cookies"	February 7, 2015
Recipes for perfect Latin flan, and chocolate crinkle cookies. Featuring an Equipment Corner covering cookie presses.
358	"Chicken and Rice Get an Upgrade"	February 14, 2015
Recipes for crispy-skinned chicken breasts with vinegar-pepper pan sauce, and rice and pasta pilaf. Featuring a Tasting Lab on jasmine rice.
359	"Seafood Specials"	February 21, 2015
Recipes for cioppino, and shrimp fra diavolo. Featuring an Equipment Corner covering home seltzer makers and a Tasting Lab on fire-roasted tomatoes.
360	"Classic Fare with Flair"	February 28, 2015
Recipes for herb-roasted Cornish game hens, and French apple tart. Featuring an Equipment Corner covering French press coffee makers.
362	"Springtime Sweets"	March 7, 2015
Recipes for lemon pudding cakes, and fresh strawberry mousse. Featuring an Equipment Corner covering high-end stand mixers.
363	"Mahogany Chicken and Asparagus Stir-Fry"	March 14, 2015
Recipes for mahogany chicken thighs, and stir-fried asparagus with shiitake mushrooms. Featuring an Equipment Corner covering red wine stain removers and tablet stands and covers.
364	"The Italian Vegetarian"	April 11, 2015
Recipes for eggplant involtini, and fusilli with ricotta and spinach. Featuring an Equipment Corner covering microwave pasta cookers and a Tasting Lab on supermarket prosciutto.
365	"Spa Cuisine Gets a Makeover"	April 18, 2015
Recipes for perfect poached chicken breasts, and carrot-ginger soup. Featuring an Equipment Corner covering chef's knives for kids and mandolines.
366	"Pizza and Cookies go Gluten-Free"	April 25, 2015
A recipe for the best gluten-free pizza. Featuring a Tasting Lab on gluten-free spaghetti.
367	"Southeast Asian Specialties"	May 2, 2015
Recipes for Vietnamese beef pho, and Singapore noodles.
368	"Great Grilled Burgers and Sweet Potato Fries"	May 9, 2015
Recipes for tender and juicy grilled burgers, and thick-cut sweet potato fries. Featuring a Tasting Lab on Swiss cheese.
369	"Favorite Ways with the Catch of the Day"	May 16, 2015
Recipes for grilled fish tacos, and sesame-crusted salmon with lemon and ginger. Featuring an Equipment Corner covering bench scrapers.
370	"Dinner in the Mediterranean"	May 23, 2015
Recipes for grilled chicken souvlaki, and tabbouleh. Featuring an Equipment Corner covering mixing bowls and Greek yogurt makers.
371	"Spicing Up the Backyard Barbecue"	May 30, 2015
Recipes for garlic-lime grilled pork tenderloin steaks; and quinoa pilaf with chipotle, queso fresco, and peanuts. Featuring an Equipment Corner covering grill brushes, pizza grilling kits, and burger presses.
372	"Scallops and Shrimps Hot Off the Grill"	June 6, 2015
A recipe for grilled bacon-wrapped scallops. Featuring an Equipment Corner covering wine chillers and a Tasting Lab on supermarket frozen yogurt.
373	"Introducing Caldo Verde and White Gazpacho"	June 13, 2015
Recipes for caldo verde, and Spanish chilled almond and garlic soup. Featuring an Equipment Corner covering soup ladles.
374	"Get a Rise out of Your Eggs"	June 20, 2015
Recipes for pasta frittata with sausage and hot peppers, and cheese soufflé.
375	"Let's Make Bread"	June 27, 2015
Recipes for easy sandwich bread, and zucchini bread. Featuring a Tasting Lab on artisanal cream cheese.
376	"Two Ways to Unlock Asian Flavor"	July 4, 2015
Recipes for Thai chicken curry with potatoes and peanuts, and Chinese braised beef. Featuring a Tasting Lab on five-spice powder.
377	"A Meal to Celebrate Fall"	July 11, 2015
Recipes for slow-roasted bone-in pork rib roast, and roasted butternut squash with browned butter and hazelnuts. Featuring an Equipment Corner covering food storage bags.
378	"Baguettes at Home"	July 18, 2015
A recipe for authentic baguettes at home.

== Season 16 (2016) ==
This is the final season hosted by Christopher Kimball.

No.	Title	Original release date
379	"French Bistro Favorites"	January 2, 2016
Recipes for simple pot-au-feu, and raspberry charlotte.
380	"New York Natives"	January 9, 2016
Recipes for foolproof New York cheesecake, and New York bagels.
381	"A Hearty Start to the Day"	January 16, 2016
Recipes for eggs pipérade, chocolate hazelnut spread, and 100 percent whole-wheat pancakes. Featuring a Tasting Lab on maple syrup.
382	"A Hearty Fall Feast"	January 23, 2016
Recipes for roasted brined turkey, roasted rack of lamb with sweet mint-almond relish, and root vegetable gratin. Featuring a Tasting Lab on Dijon mustard.
383	"Spanish Chicken and Israeli Couscous"	January 30, 2016
Recipes for Spanish braised chicken with sherry and saffron (pollo en pepitoria); and Israeli couscous with lemon, mint, peas, feta, and pickled shallots. Featuring a Tasting Lab on Israeli couscous.
384	"Pass the Pasta"	February 6, 2016
Recipes for sausage meatballs and spaghetti, and tagliatelle with prosciutto and peas. Featuring an Equipment Corner covering insulated shopping totes.
385	"Chocolate-Caramel Layer Cake"	February 13, 2016
A recipe for chocolate-caramel layer cake. Featuring an Equipment Corner covering large ice cream makers and ice cream scoops.
386	"Why Not Add Wine?"	February 20, 2016
Recipes for Tuscan-style beef stew, and coq au riesling. Featuring an Equipment Corner covering corkscrew wine openers.
387	"Saucing Up Chicken and Roasting Mushrooms"	February 27, 2016
Recipes for quick sauces (roasted red pepper, sun-dried tomato, and tomatillo) for sautéed chicken, and roasted mushrooms with Parmesan and pine nuts. Featuring an Equipment Corner covering serrated paring knives.
388	"Sweet and Spicy Asian Specialties"	March 26, 2016
Recipes for crispy salt and pepper shrimp, and Vietnamese-style caramel chicken with broccoli. Featuring a Tasting Lab on Sichuan peppercorns.
389	"A Roast for the Holidays"	April 2, 2016
Recipes for fennel-coriander top sirloin roast, and duck fat-roasted potatoes. Featuring an Equipment Corner covering carving boards.
390	"Pork and Pears"	April 9, 2016
Recipes for milk-braised pork loin, and roasted pears with dried apricots and pistachios. Featuring an Equipment Corner covering apple corers and a Tasting Lab on apricot preserves.
391	"Roast Chicken and Potatoes Revisited"	April 16, 2016
Recipes for slow-roasted chicken parts with shallot-garlic pan sauce, and boiled potatoes with black olive tapenade. Featuring an Equipment Corner covering carbon-steel knives.
392	"Dinner in Italy"	April 23, 2016
Recipes for thick-crust Sicilian-style pizza; pasta with cauliflower, bacon, and bread crumbs; and homemade ricotta cheese.
393	"Serving Up Noodles and Rice"	April 30, 2016
Recipes for Japanese-style stir-fried noodles with beef, and fried brown rice with pork and shrimp. Featuring an Equipment Corner covering knife sharpeners.
394	"Italian with Ease"	May 7, 2016
Recipes for semolina gnocchi (gnocchi alla romana), and Italian sausage with grapes and balsamic vinegar. Featuring a Tasting Lab on supermarket balsamic vinegar.
395	"French Pork Chops and Bisque"	May 14, 2016
Recipes for French-style pork chops with apples and calvados, and mushroom bisque. Featuring a Tasting Lab on supermarket brie.
396	"Ultimate Chinese"	May 21, 2016
Recipes for mu shu pork, and crispy orange beef. Featuring an Equipment Corner covering rice cookers.
397	"Vegetarian Essentials"	May 28, 2016
Recipes for black bean burgers, vegetable broth base, super-greens soup. Featuring a Tasting Lab on vegetarian broth.
398	"Braised to Perfection"	June 18, 2016
Recipes for braised halibut with leeks and mustard, and smoked salmon. Featuring an Equipment Corner covering warming trays.
399	"Dinner in Cuba"	June 25, 2016
Recipes for Cuban braised shredded beef (ropa vieja); and mango, orange and jicama salad. Featuring a Tasting Lab on fried sweet plantains (plátanos maduros).
400	"Country Ribs and Corn Muffins"	July 2, 2016
Recipes for sweet and tangy grilled country-style pork ribs, and savory corn muffins. Featuring an Equipment Corner covering laundry stain removers.
401	"Pork Kebabs and Steaks Hit the Grill"	July 9, 2016
Recipes for ultimate charcoal-grilled steaks, and grilled pork kebabs with hoisin and five spice. Featuring an Equipment Corner covering steak knives, jar spatulas, and jar openers.
402	"Mexican Mole and Drunken Beans"	July 16, 2016
Recipes for Mexican mole, and drunken beans. Featuring a Tasting Lab on Mexican lagers.
403	"Grilled Chicken and Salad with a Kick"	July 23, 2016
Recipes for peri peri grilled chicken, and pita bread salad with tomatoes and cucumber (fattoush).
404	"Revolutionizing Classic Fruit Desserts"	July 30, 2016
Recipes for strawberry-rhubarb pie, and cherry clafouti. Featuring an Equipment Corner covering cold brew coffee makers.

== Season 17 (2017) ==
This is the first season hosted by Bridget Lancaster and Julia Collin-Davison.

No.	Title	Original release date
405	"Cast Iron Staples"	January 7, 2017
Recipes for cast iron steak, and crisp roast butterflied chicken with rosemary and garlic. Featuring an Equipment Corner covering paper towel holders and a Science Segment on Cast Iron.
406	"Two Modern Stews"	January 14, 2017
Recipes for Portuguese-style beef stew (alcatra), and quinoa and vegetable stew. Featuring an Gadget Corner covering salad dressing shakers, potato mashers, manual spice grinders, and mason jar adapters, and a Tasting Lab on prepared pesto.
407	"Back to Basics"	January 21, 2017
Recipes for roasted bone-in chicken breasts, best baked potatoes, and jalapeño and cilandro sauce. Featuring an Equipment Corner covering new-generation kitchen trash cans.
408	"New England Classics"	January 28, 2017
Recipes for home-corned beef with vegetables, and snickerdoodles. Featuring a Tasting Lab on sherry vinegar.
409	"Flavorful Italian Favorites"	February 4, 2017
Recipes for cheese and tomato lasagna, and really good garlic bread. Featuring a Tasting Lab on anchovies.
410	"Seafood Supper"	February 11, 2017
Recipes for pan-seared salmon, mango-mint salsa, and shrimp scampi. Featuring a Tasting Lab on fish sauce and Science Segment on Wild and Farmed Salmon.
411	"The Ultimate Sticky Buns"	February 18, 2017
A recipe for sticky buns. Featuring an Equipment Corner covering electric waffle makers and a Tasting Lab on almond butter.
412	"Hearty One Pot Meals"	February 25, 2017
Recipes for best ground beef chili, and red lentil soup with North African spices. Featuring an Equipment Corner covering food processors.
413	"Outsmarting Thanksgiving"	March 4, 2017
Recipes for easier roast turkey and gravy, foolproof boiled corn, and chili-lime salt. Featuring an Gadget Corner covering oven thermometers.
414	"Korean Feast"	March 11, 2017
Recipes for Korean rice bowl (dolsot bibimbap), and Korean fried chicken wings. Featuring an Equipment Corner covering spider skimmers.
415	"Big Easy Favorites"	March 18, 2017
Recipes for red beans and rice, and chicken and sausage gumbo. Featuring a Tasting Lab on smoked paprika.
416	"Pantry Pastas"	March 25, 2017
Recipes for pasta e ceci (pasta with chickpeas), and penne arrabbiata. Featuring a Tasting Lab on supermarket Parmesan and a Science Segment on Cheese Interior.
417	"Refreshing Desserts"	April 1, 2017
Recipes for Ginger Frozen Yogurt and Lemon Posset with Berries. Featuring a Gadget Segment on the Personal Blenders and an Equipment Corner on Digital Scales.
418	"Baked Alaska Showstopper"	April 8, 2017
Recipe for Baked Alaska. Featuring a Science Segment on insulation and thermodynamics at work in Baked Alaska, Equipment Corner on Ice Cream Machines and a Gadget Segment on Offset Spatulas.
419	"Italian Chicken"	April 15, 2017
Recipes for Chicken Marsala and Lemon Skillet Chicken. Featuring an Equipment Corner on Manual Citrus Juicers.
420	"Autumn Desserts"	April 22, 2017
Recipes for Chewy Oatmeal Cookies and Ultranutty Pecan Bars. Featuring an Equipment Corner on Mini Prep Bowls and a Gadget Segment on Best Pie Carriers.
421	"Chinese Takeout, Revised"	April 29, 2017
Recipes for Beef Sti-Fry and Scallion Pancakes, with a soy sauce taste test.
422	"Elegant Fall Dinner"	May 6, 2017
Recipes for Roast Pork and Farro Salad, with equipment reviews of wine accessories.
423	"Canning Classics"	May 13, 2017
Recipes for Classic Strawberry Jam and Bread and Butter pickles, with reviews of canning tools.
424	"Steak and Veggies"	May 20, 2017
Recipes for Pan-Seared Flank Steak and Walkaway Rattatouille, with equipment reviews of carbon steel skillets.
425	"Mediterranean Grill"	May 27, 2017
Recipes for Grilled Shrimp and Vegetable Kebabs, and Persian Style Rice with Golden Crust, and a tasting of greek yogurt.
426	"A Spanish Affair"	June 3, 2017
Recipes for Paella on the Grill and Patatas Bravas, with equipment reviews of Paella pans.
427	"Fast Food Makeovers"	June 10, 2017
Recipes for Grilled Pizza and Shredded Chicken Tacos, with a tasting of olive oil, and review of avocado gadgets.
428	"Summer Dinner Party"	June 17, 2017
Recipes for Grill-Roasted Beef Tenderloin and Pear-Walnut Upside-Down cake, with reviews of gas grills and quirky gadgets.
429	"Summer Pork Supper"	June 24, 2017
Recipes for Smoked Pork Loin and Sweet Potato Soup, with reviews of grill gadgets.
430	"Comfort Classics"	July 1, 2017
Recipes for Roast Chicken and Almost No-Knead Sourdough Bread.

== Season 18 (2018) ==
This is the final season produced at ATK's original test facility in Brookline, Massachusetts.

No.	Title	Original release date
431	"Grown Up Comfort Classics"	January 6, 2018
Recipes for simple stovetop macaroni and cheese, and turkey meatloaf with ketchup-brown sugar glaze. Featuring an Equipment Corner for large saucepans, a Gadget Desk segment for lid holders, and a Science Department segment on the proper way to use a whisk.
432	"Flavors of Thailand"	January 13, 2018
Recipes for everyday pad Thai, and panang beef curry. Featuring a Tasting Lab for coconut milk.
433	"How to Roast Everything"	January 20, 2018
Recipes for beef tenderloin with smoky potatoes and persillade relish, and turkey breast en concotte with pan gravy. Featuring a Tasting Lab on turkey and a Gadget Desk segment on fat separators.
434	"All Chocolate, All the Time"	January 27, 2018
Recipes for Boston cream pie, and chocolate sheet cake with milk chocolate frosting. Featuring an Equipment Corner on silicone spatulas.
435	"Ultimate Italian"	February 5, 2018
Recipes for porchetta, and Parmesan farrotto. Featuring a Tasting Lab on ricotta and a Gadget Desk segment on wine coolers.
436	"Modern Weeknight Meals"	February 10, 2018
Recipes for one-hour broiled chicken and pan sauce, and modern cauliflower gratin. Featuring an Equipment Corner on blenders.
437	"Vegan for Everyone"	February 17, 2018
Recipes for vegan pinto bean-beet burger, and Buffalo cauliflower bites. Featuring a Tasting Lab on vegan mayo and a Gadget Desk segment on spiralizers.
438	"Just Add Apples"	February 24, 2018
Recipes for apple strudel, and cider-glazed apple bundt cake. Featuring an Equipment Corner on bundt pans.
439	"Soup for Dinner"	March 3, 2018
Recipes for chicken bouillabaisse, and avgolemono. Featuring a Tasting Lab on cinnamon.
440	"Pressure Cooker Perfection"	March 10, 2018
Recipes for farmhouse chicken noodle soup in the pressure cooker, and pressure-cooker pot roast. Featuring a Tasting Lab on gruyere and a Science Department segment on pressure cookers.
441	"Diner-Style Favorites with a Twist"	March 17, 2018
Recipes for Italian-style turkey meatballs, and kale Caesar salad. Featuring an Equipment Corner on dry storage containers and a Science Department segment on kale's unique flavor.
442	"Italian Seafood Suppers"	March 24, 2018
Recipes for linguine allo scoglio, and Tuscan shrimp and beans. Featuring an Equipment Corner on manual pasta machines and a Gadget Desk segment on restaurant tools that every home cook should use.
443	"Mexican Dinner Party"	March 31, 2018
Recipes for tamales with red chicken chile filling, and chorizo and potato tacos.
444	"Mediterranean Sweets"	April 7, 2018
Recipes for olive oil cake, and baklava.
445	"Weeknight Japanese Suppers"	April 14, 2018
Recipes for crispy pan-fried chicken cutlets, and miso-marinated salmon. Featuring an Equipment Corner on Santoku knives.
446	"Brunch at Home"	April 21, 2018
Recipes for foolproof eggs Benedict, and German pancake. Featuring an Equipment Corner on espresso machines.
447	"Simple Chinese Staples"	April 28, 2018
Recipes for three cup chicken, and smashed cucumbers. Featuring a Tasting Lab on firm tofu.
448	"Vibrant Mediterranean Cooking"	May 5, 2018
Recipes for swordfish skewers with tomato-scallion caponata on the grill, and Egyptian barley salad. Featuring a Tasting Lab on feta.
449	"Grilled Steak and Fruit Tart"	May 12, 2018
Recipes for grill-smoked and herb-rubbed flat iron steaks, and fresh fruit tart. Featuring a Tasting Lab on mascarpone and a Science Department segment on salting.
450	"Spicing Up the Grill"	May 19, 2018
Recipes for Thai grilled Cornish hens with chili dipping sauce, and grilled pita stuffed with lamb. Featuring a Tasting Lab on tahini and a Gadget Desk segment on grill tongs.
451	"Pork Chops and Corn Fritters, Perfected"	May 26, 2018
Recipes for pan-seared thick-cut boneless pork chops, and corn fritters. Featuring a Tasting Lab on white wine vinegar.
452	"Chinese Classics"	June 2, 2018
Recipes for Chinese barbecued pork, and Sichuan braised tofu with beef (mapo tofu). Featuring an Equipment Corner on wire racks and rimmed baking sheets.
453	"Summer Cookout"	June 9, 2018
Recipes for spice-rubbed chicken drumsticks on the grill, and New England baked beans. Featuring an Equipment Corner on baking peels.
454	"To Meat or Not to Meat (Sauce)"	June 16, 2018
Recipes for tagliatelle with bolognese sauce, and meatless "meat" sauce. Featuring a Tasting Lab on crushed tomatoes and a Science Department segment on why you can't overcook mushrooms.
455	"Elegant Desserts"	June 23, 2018
Recipes for millionaire's shortbread, and gateau Breton with apricot filling. Featuring an Equipment Corner on serrated knives.
456	"Pub-Style Favorites, Revisited"	June 30, 2018
Recipes for pub-style steak and ale pie, and Boston brown bread. Featuring an Equipment Corner on knife blocks.
457	"Home for the Holidays"	July 7, 2018
The America's Test Kitchen cast shares their favorite holiday memories and recipes.

== Season 19 (2019) ==
This is the first season produced at ATK's new test facility at the Innovation and Design Building in Boston, Massachusetts.

No.	Title	Original release date
458	"Pork Chops and Oven Fries"	January 5, 2019
Recipes for deviled pork chops, and thick-cut oven fries. Featuring a Tasting Lab on dark chocolate chips, a Gadget Desk segment on kids' oven mitts, and a Science segment on non-Newtonian fluids.
459	"Chocolate Delights"	January 12, 2019
Recipes for chocolate cream pie with foolproof all-butter dough, and dark chocolate fudge sauce. Featuring a Tasting Lab on cocoa powder.
460	"Roast Chicken and Sprouts"	January 19, 2019
Recipes for roast chicken with warm bread salad, and skillet-roasted brussels sprouts with chile, peanuts, and mint. Featuring a Tasting Lab on white miso.
461	"The Perfect Cake"	January 26, 2019
Recipes for gingerbread layer cake, and sticky toffee pudding cakes. Featuring a Gadget Desk segment on stovetop kettles.
462	"Chinese Favorites"	February 2, 2019
Recipes for flat hand-pulled noodles with chili oil vinaigrette, and Chinese-style barbecued spareribs. Featuring an Equipment Corner on meat cleavers.
463	"The Perfect Cookie"	February 9, 2019
Recipes for easy holiday sugar cookies, and best lemon bars. Featuring an Equipment Corner on parchment paper and a Gadget Desk segment silicone baking mats.
464	"Elegant Dinner Party"	February 16, 2019
Recipes for braised brisket with pomegranate, cumin, and cilantro; and duchess potato casserole. Featuring an Equipment Corner on twist corkscrews.
465	"Sous Vide for Everybody"	February 23, 2019
Recipes for sous vide perfect seared steaks, and sous vide soft-poached eggs. Featuring an Equipment Corner on sous vide machines.
466	"Chicken and Biscuits"	March 2, 2019
Recipes for indoor pulled chicken, and flaky buttermilk biscuits. Featuring a Tasting Lab on basmati rice and a Gadget Desk segment on gadgets you didn't know you needed.
467	"Cooking at Home with Bridget and Julia"	March 23, 2019
Recipes for hearty beef and vegetable stew, and cod baked in foil with leeks and carrots. Featuring an Equipment Corner on 13 by 9-inch glass baking dishes and a Science segment on the science behind the sound and flavor of food.
468	"Mexican Flare"	March 30, 2019
Recipes for crispy ground beef tacos, and roasted poblano and black bean enchiladas. Featuring a Gadget Desk segment on fire extinguishers and a Science segment on fast-freezing liquid nitrogen.
469	"Weeknight Italian"	April 6, 2019
Recipes for one-hour pizza, and beef short rib ragu. Featuring an Equipment Corner on baking stones and steels and a Gadget Desk segment on under-appliance dusters.
470	"Brunch Favorites"	April 13, 2019
Recipes for coffee cake with pecan-cinnamon streusel, and broccoli and feta frittata. Featuring a Tasting Lab on crunchy peanut butter and a Gadget Desk segment on smart gadgets for home cooks.
471	"Spring Dinner for Company"	April 20, 2019
Recipes for roasted whole side of salmon, and buttery spring vegetables. Featuring a Tasting Lab on turmeric, a Gadget Desk segment on kids' vegetable peelers, and a Science segment on the magic of emulsions.
472	"How to Braise Everything"	April 27, 2019
Recipes for braised oxtails with white beans, tomatoes, and Aleppo pepper; and fava beans with artichokes, asparagus, and peas. Featuring an Equipment Corner on Dutch ovens.
473	"A Taste of Brazil"	May 4, 2019
Recipes for Brazilian shrimp and fish stew, and Brazilian cheese bread. Featuring a Tasting Lab on Pecorino Romano and a Science segment on the importance of taking your time when you make an emulsion.
474	"Classic Chinese at Home"	May 11, 2019
Recipes for Chinese pork dumplings, and Beijing-style meat sauce and noodles. Featuring a Gadget Desk segment on ginger graters.
475	"Middle Eastern Dinner"	May 18, 2019
Recipes for falafel, and Moroccan lentil and chickpea soup (harira). Featuring a Tasting Lab on canned chickpeas.
486	"Better Breakfast"	May 25, 2019
Recipes for easy pancakes, and creamy French-style scrambled eggs. Featuring a Tasting Lab on turkey bacon, a Gadget Desk segment on syrup dispensers, and a Science segment on the science of baking soda and browning.
487	"Updated Italian"	June 22, 2019
Recipes for chicken piccata, and chocolate semifreddo. Featuring a Science segment on fat and temperature perception.
488	"Italian Classics"	June 29, 2019
Recipes for pane francese, and chicken vesuvio.
489	"New Flavors on the Grill"	July 6, 2019
Recipes for Vietnamese grilled pork patties (bun cha), and Japanese grilled steak and scallion rolls (negimaki). Featuring an Equipment Corner on kitchen shears.
490	"Latin Summer Favorites"	July 13, 2019
Recipes for grilled mojo-marinated skirt steak, and Peruvian-style ceviche. Featuring an Equipment Corner on boning knives.
491	"Pork Two Ways"	July 20, 2019
Recipes for perfect pan-seared pork tenderloin steaks, and crispy slow-roasted pork belly. Featuring an Equipment Corner on air fryers.
492	"Summer Picnic Party"	July 27, 2019
Recipes for grilled chicken thighs with mustard and tarragon, and Italian pasta salad. Featuring a Tasting Lab on fresh mozzarella.
493	"Latin Comfort Food"	August 3, 2019
Recipes for braised New Mexico-style pork in red chile sauce (carne adovada), and Mexican-style corn salad (esquites). Featuring an Equipment Corner on 9-inch tongs.

== Season 20 (2020) ==
No.	Title	Original release date
494	"Eggs for the Holidays"	January 4, 2020
495	"A Trip to Rome"	January 11, 2020
496	"Pork and Potatoes"	January 18, 2020
497	"Spiced and Sweet"	January 25, 2020
498	"Two Classic Pastas"	February 1, 2020
499	"Chicken and Biscuits"	February 8, 2020
500	"The Very Best Paris-Brest"	February 15, 2020
501	"Hearty Mediterranean at Home"	February 22, 2020
502	"Flavorful Chinese Favorites"	February 29, 2020
503	"Nutritious and Delicious"	March 7, 2020
504	"Springtime Feast"	March 14, 2020
505	"Savory and Sweet Italian"	March 21, 2020
506	"Sous Vide for Company"	March 28, 2020
507	"Childhood Favorites, Grown Up"	April 4, 2020
508	"Tasty Thai"	April 11, 2020
509	"The Most Important Meal"	April 18, 2020
510	"Something Hearty, Something Light"	April 25, 2020
511	"Thanksgiving for a Crowd"	May 2, 2020
512	"Rustic French Fare"	June 13, 2020
513	"Grill-Roasted Chicken and Green Beans"	June 20, 2020
514	"New Ways with Ribs and Mushrooms"	June 27, 2020
515	"Plum and Pear Desserts"	July 4, 2020
516	"Mexican Comfort Food"	July 11, 2020
517	"The Chicken or the Egg?"	July 18, 2020
518	"Summertime Staples"	July 25, 2020
519	"Pork and Greens"	August 1, 2020

== Season 21 (2021) ==
Due to the COVID-19 pandemic, season 21 episodes were recorded at the various cast member's homes with the shows being branded as America's Test Kitchen at Home.

No.	Title	Original release date
520	"A Taste of Mexico"	January 2, 2021
521	"Autumn Supper"	January 9, 2021
522	"Simple Chicken Dinner"	January 16, 2021
523	"Simple and Elegant Dinner"	January 23, 2021
524	"Breakfast Basics"	January 30, 2021
525	"French-Inspired Comfort Food"	February 6, 2021
526	"Japanese-Inspired Favorites"	February 13, 2021
527	"Crepes Two Ways"	February 20, 2021
528	"Rustic Italian Fare"	February 27, 2021
529	"Tagine and Hummus"	March 6, 2021
530	"Mediterranean Comfort Food"	March 13, 2021
531	"Schnitzel and Roesti"	March 20, 2021
532	"Indian Feast"	March 27, 2021
533	"Bistro Classics at Home"	April 3, 2021
534	"Salmon Steaks Done Right"	April 10, 2021
535	"Burgers and Chips"	April 17, 2021
536	"Bake Sale Favorites"	April 24, 2021
537	"Back to Grilling Basics"	May 1, 2021
538	"A Trip to Vietnam"	May 8, 2021
539	"Tacos, Guacamole, and Margaritas"	May 15, 2021
540	"Butter-Basted Fish and Succotash"	May 22, 2021
541	"Cook It in Cast Iron"	May 29, 2021
542	"Summer Dinner for Two"	June 5, 2021
543	"Farmers’ Market Fare"	June 12, 2021
544	"Grilled Cheese and Tomato Soup"	June 19, 2021
545	"Elegant French Desserts"	June 26, 2021

== Season 22 (2022) ==
No.	Title	Original release date
546	"Turkey Two Ways"	January 8, 2022
547	"Plant-Based Perfection"	January 15, 2022
548	"French Chicken and Potatoes"	January 22, 2022
549	"Prime Rib and Popovers"	January 29, 2022
550	"Bulgogi and Bokkeumbap"	February 5, 2022
551	"Jewish Baking"	February 12, 2022
552	"Shrimp, Fast and Slow"	February 19, 2022
553	"Italian-Inspired Dinners"	February 26, 2022
554	"Irish Staples"	March 5, 2022
555	"Shareable Spanish Fare"	March 12, 2022
556	"Holiday Dessert and Salad"	March 19, 2022
557	"Vindaloo and Chana Masala"	March 26, 2022
558	"Springtime Feast"	April 2, 2022
559	"Ode to Armenia"	April 9, 2022
560	"Breakfast with a Kick"	April 16, 2022
561	"Quick Fish Dinners"	April 23, 2022
562	"Italian Bites"	April 30, 2022
563	"Perfectly Fried Seafood"	May 7, 2022
564	"Chinese Noodles and Meatballs"	May 14, 2022
565	"Breakfast Baking"	May 21, 2022
566	"Pork Chops and Blondies"	May 28, 2022
567	"Flavor-Packed Chicken Dinner"	June 4, 2022
568	"Starring: Tomatoes"	June 11, 2022
569	"Summer Decadence"	June 18, 2022
570	"Pupusas and Yuca"	June 25, 2022
571	"Unexpected Salads"	July 2, 2022

== Season 23 (2023) ==
No.	Title	Original release date
572	"Ultimate Yule Log"	January 7, 2023
573	"Porchetta-Style Turkey and Fennel"	January 14, 2023
574	"Breakfast of Champions"	January 21, 2023
575	"Two Simple Pastas"	January 28, 2023
576	"Beef Wellington"	February 4, 2023
577	"Italian Sweets"	February 11, 2023
578	"Stir-Fry and Congee"	February 18, 2023
579	"Hearty Alpine Fare"	February 25, 2023
580	"French Pastries"	March 4, 2023
581	"Eggs Around the World"	March 11, 2023
582	"Chocolate Tart and Ice Cream"	March 18, 2023
583	"Chicken Two Ways"	March 25, 2023
584	"Thanksgiving for a Small Group"	April 1, 2023
585	"Pork Chops and Maple Cake"	April 8, 2023
586	"Scandinavian Brunch"	April 15, 2023
587	"Parathas and Pakoras"	April 22, 2023
588	"Seafood Feast"	April 29, 2023
589	"Spring Chicken Dinner"	May 6, 2023
590	"Sweet and Savory Choux"	May 13, 2023
591	"Hearty Soup and Salad"	May 20, 2023
592	"Grilled Short Ribs and Vegetable Casserole"	May 27, 2023
593	"Light Summer Meal"	June 3, 2023
594	"Blackened Chicken and Roasted Okra"	June 10, 2023
595	"Cherry and Berry Desserts"	June 17, 2023
596	"Spanish Summer Supper"	June 24, 2023
597	"Puerto Rican Cookout"	July 1, 2023

== Season 24 (2024) ==
No.	Title	Original release date
598	"Bienvenue à la Brasserie"	January 6, 2024
599	"Borscht and Rye"	January 13, 2024
600	"Mushroom Mains"	January 20, 2024
601	"A Heartier Taste of Italy"	January 27, 2024
602	"Game Day Favorites From Your Air Fryer"	February 3, 2024
603	"Steakhouse for Two"	February 10, 2024
604	"Multicooker Perfection"	February 17, 2024
605	"Japanese Comfort Food"	February 24, 2024
606	"Pies Big and Small"	March 23, 2024
607	"Fried Favorites"	March 30, 2024
608	"Dutch Oven Dinners"	April 6, 2024
609	"Flavors of Jamaica"	March 13, 2024
610	"Passover Celebration"	April 20, 2024
611	"Mexican Feast"	April 27, 2024
612	"A Taste of Thailand"	May 4, 2024
613	"Nuts over Chocolate"	May 11, 2024
614	"What's for Dinner? Bacon!"	May 18, 2024
615	"Chinese Stir-Fry and Salad"	May 25, 2024
616	"Colorful Cakes"	June 15, 2024
617	"Mediterranean Mains"	June 22, 2024
618	"Cast Iron Mornings"	June 29, 2024
619	"A Taste of Lebanon"	July 6, 2024
620	"Fish and Vegetables Hit the Grill"	July 13, 2024
621	"Holiday Cocktail Party"	July 20, 2024
622	"Better Burgers"	July 27, 2024
623	"Mediterranean Seafood"	August 3, 2024

== Season 25 (2024-25) ==
No.	Title	Original release date
624	"Pork and Apples"	September 21, 2024
625	"Chicken on the Grill"	September 28, 2024
626	"Fall Bounty"	October 5, 2024
627	"The Noodle Show"	October 12, 2024
628	"Breakfast for a Crowd"	October 19, 2024
629	"Easy Chicken Dinners"	October 26, 2024
630	"Savory Pies"	November 2, 2024
631	"Everything but the Turkey"	November 9, 2024
632	"New Thanksgiving Classics"	November 16, 2024
633	"A Showstopping Chocolate-Raspberry Trifle"	December 7, 2024
634	"Christmas Baking"	December 14, 2024
635	"Fish the French Way"	January 4, 2025
636	"Pub-Style Favorites"	January 11, 2025
637	"Pasta with Greens"	January 18, 2025
638	"Bold and Beefy"	January 25, 2025
639	"Dinner at the Bier Garten"	February 1, 2025
640	"Pork Chops for Everyone"	February 8, 2025
641	"Decadent Pasta Dishes"	February 15, 2025
642	"Spring Dinner for Two"	April 5, 2025
643	"Breakfast with a French Accent"	April 12, 2025
644	"Caramel Delights"	April 19, 2025
645	"Unexpected Burgers"	April 26, 2025
646	"Mexican Classics, Slow and Fast"	May 3, 2025
647	"Brunch at the Bistro"	May 10, 2025
648	"Saucy Mediterranean Nosh"	May 17, 2025
649	"E26 Chinese Dumplings and Soup"	May 24, 2025
Recipes for Har Gow and Hong Kong-Style Wonton Noodle Soup. Talks about Chicories.

== Season 26 (2025-26) ==
This is the final season to star test cook Elle Simone before her death on January 5, 2026.

No.	Title	Original release date
650	"E01 Make-Ahead Masterclass"	September 20, 2025
Recipes for tender Glazed Boneless Beef Short Ribs and Make-Way-Ahead Dinner Rolls. Review of tools and tips for easier meal prep.
651	"E02 Flavor-Packed Pastas"	September 27, 2025
Recipes for Spaghetti All’Assassina, a hyperlocal dish from Bari, Italy and Triple Mushroom Pasta. Tasting of whole canned tomatoes.
652	"E03 Corn Cakes and Chowder"	October 4, 2025
Recipes for Venezuelan Cheese-Filled Corn Cakes (Cachapas Con Queso De Mano) and Fresh Corn Chowder. Equipment review of dish towels and physics to demonstrate the importance of a sharp knife.
653	"E04 Turkey Lasagna and Chocolate Sorbet"	October 11, 2025
Recipes for Turkey Sausage Lasagna and Chocolate Sorbet. Talks all about sugar.
654	"E05 Farmer's Brunch"	October 18, 2025
Recipes for German Farmer’s Breakfast (Bauernfrühstück) and Appeltaart. Reviews of cookie sheets.
655	"E06 Ice Cream Cake"	October 25, 2025
Recipes for Ice Cream Cake. Discussion of unexpected powers of melting ice.
656	"E07 Two Takes on Chicken and Rice"	November 1, 2025
Recipes for Chicken Yassa (Senegalese Braised Chicken) and Peruvian Arroz con Pollo. Tasting of chicken broths.
656	"E08 Pan-Seared Halibut and Ma’amoul"	November 8, 2025
Recipes for Pan-Seared Halibut with Wilted Bitter Salad and buttery semolina cookies, Ma’amoul. Taste test of frozen puff pastries.
655	"E09 New Thanksgiving Favorites"	November 15, 2025
Recipes for Stuffed Spatchcocked Turkey and Shaved Celery Salad with Pomegranate-Honey Vinaigrette. Equipment review of slicing knives.
656	"E10 Taiwanese Staples"	December 6, 2025
Recipes for Gua Bao (Taiwanese steamed buns with braised pork belly) and Quick Taiwanese Pork Rice. Tasting review of hoisin sauce.
657	"E11 The Ultimate Holiday Dinner Party"	December 13, 2025
Recipes for Shrimp Cocktail and Easy Beef Tenderloin with Harissa Rub and Cilantro-Mint Relish.
658	"E12 Zesty Salmon and Salad"	January 3, 2026
Recipes for Double-Glazed Salmon with Lemon and Thyme and Kale Salad with Radishes, Grapefruit, and Candied Pepitas. Review of the Best Eco-Friendly Multipurpose Cleaners
659	"E13 Weeknight Chicken and Mashed Potatoes"	January 10, 2026
Recipes for Cold-Start Pan-Seared Chicken Breasts with Cherry and Rosemary Pan Sauce Easiest Mashed Potatoes. Review of paper towels.
660	"E14 Mediterranean Eggplant Dishes"	January 17, 2026
Recipes for Silky Roasted Eggplant with Tomato and Feta and Zaalouk (Moroccan Eggplant Meze). Tasting of hummus.
661	"E15 Catalonian Supper"	January 24, 2026
Recipes for Zarzuela (Spanish Seafood Stew) and Red Pepper Coques. Comparison of disposable and reusable plastic bags.
662	"E16 Breakfast from Scratch"	January 31, 2026
Recipes for Biscuit Breakfast Sandwiches and Spiced Pear, Buckwheat, and Almond Pancakes. Techniques to make picture-perfect pancakes.
663	"E17 A Taste of Sichuan"	February 7, 2026
Recipes for Dry Chili Chicken (Làzi Jī 辣子雞) and Suan La Bai Cai (Sour and Hot Nappa Cabbage). Talk about different miso.
664	"E18 A Tale of Two Pastas"	February 14, 2026
Recipes for Pici alla Boscaiola (Handmade Pasta with Mushrooms and Sausage) and Pasta with Creamy Lemon–Sichuan Peppercorn Sauce . Also, a Stone-Ground Flour 101 Taste Test .
665	"E19 Savory Mexican Classics"	April 4, 2026
Recipes for Chiles en Nogada and Tacos Gobernador. Also, oil shimmers.
666	"E20 Comforting Japanese Dinners"	April 11, 2026
Recipes for Tonkatsu (Japanese Fried Pork Chops) and Kare Raisu (Japanese Curry Rice with Chicken). Tasting reviews of Japanese rice types.
667	"E21 Maple Pork Chops and Squash Soup"	April 18, 2026
Recipes for Maple Pork Chops with Sweet Potato–Bacon Hash and Leek, Fennel, and Squash Soup with Sausage. Equipment review of enameled cast-iron skillets and an explanation of how to defrost food quickly.
668	"E22 Seafood Stew and Salmon Burgers"	April 25, 2026
Recipes for Crab and Shrimp Stew and Fresh Salmon Burgers with Sriracha Mayonnaise. Equipment review of gyuto knives.
669	"E23 New England Clambake"	May 2, 2026
Recipes for New England Clambake and Grilled Fresh Cornbread with Charred Jalapeños and Cheddar.
670	"E24 Tandoori Salmon and Broiled Zucchini"	May 9, 2026
Recipes Tandoori Salmon and Broiled Smashed Zucchini with Garlicky Yogurt. Review of kitchen gadgets under $15 and taste test of yogurt.
671	"E25 Petite French Pastries"	May 16, 2026
Recipes for Macarons with Raspberry Buttercream and Gougères.
672	"E26 Grilled Flank Steak and Chili Crisp Noodles"	May 23, 2026
Recipes for Grilled Flank Steak and Chili Crisp Noodles. Why cooking meat to medium makes it more tender. Review of aluminum foil.

== Season 27 (2026-27) ==
No.	Title	Original release date
673	"E01 A Taste of Mexico City"	September 19, 2026
Recipes for Enchiladas Suizas (Swiss Enchiladas) and Sopa de Tortilla (Tortilla Soup). Talk about black and red rice.
674	"E02 Lemon-Braised Chicken and Fattet Hummus"	September 26, 2026
Recipes for Lemon-Braised Chicken with Pearl Couscous, Artichokes, and Chickpeas and Fattet Hummus (Crispy Pita with Garlicky Yogurt and Chickpeas). Talk about the best dish soaps and sprays.
675	"E03 Apples for Dinner and Dessert"	October 3, 2026
Recipes for Roasted Pork Tenderloin with Apples and Shallots and a french dessert, Gâteau Invisible with Brown Sugar–Cinnamon Whipped Cream. Talk about using bubbles to show how stabilizers in whipped cream work.
676	"E04 Tuscan Feast"	October 10, 2026
Recipes for Pollo al Mattone (Chicken Under a Brick) and Gluten-Free Zucchini Scarpaccia. Talk about test kitchen’s favorite wine savers.
677	"E05 Soup and Bread, The Italian Way"	October 17, 2026
Recipes for Our Zuppa Toscana and Light and Airy Focaccia. Talk about The Best Store-Bought White Bread.
678	"E06 Peruvian Fusions"	October 24, 2026
Recipes for Peruvian Beef Stir-Fry and Peruvian Green Noodles. Talk about chili oil and chili crisp.
679	"E07 Two Pasta Classics"	October 31, 2026
Recipes for Cacio e Pepe and Pasta alla Vodka. Talk about packaged pastas.
680	"E08 British Baking"	November 7, 2026
Recipes for Banoffee Pie and Browned Butter Shortbread. Talk about air as an ingredient.
681	"E09 Fresh Takes on Thanksgiving Classics"	November 14, 2026
Recipes for Maple Roast Turkey Breast & Sausage and Apple Skillet Stuffing. Talk about cultured cream.
