= Arroz =

Arroz is a surname. As a Portuguese and Spanish surname it means rice. Notable people with the surname include:

- Eduardo Arroz (born 1981), Brazilian footballer
- Jefferson Arroz (born 1988), Brazilian footballer
- Linda Arroz, American model
- Rodrigo Arroz (born 1984), Brazilian footballer

== See also ==
- Arrows (disambiguation)
