= Jefferson Arroz =

Brazilian footballer

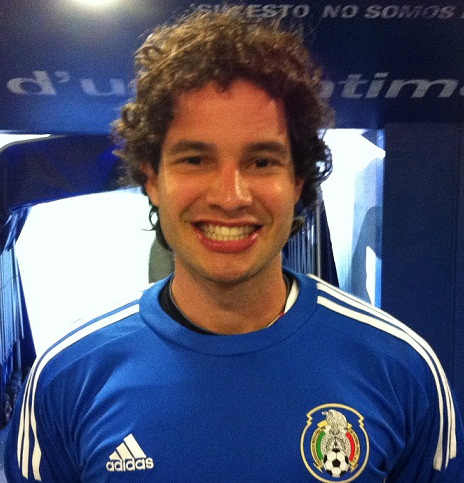

Personal information
- Full name: Jefferson de Souza Gonçalves
- Date of birth: 17 January 1988 (age 38)
- Place of birth: Cuiabá, Brazil
- Height: 1.78 m (5 ft 10 in)
- Position: Midfielder

Youth career
- Brasil Central
- Cruzeiro
- Cuiabá
- Mixto
- 2005–2008: Chievo

Senior career*
| Years | Team | Apps | (Gls) |
| 2008–2011 | Chievo | 0 | (0) |
| 2008 | → Ipatinga (loan) | | |
| 2011 | → Mixto (loan) | | |
| 2011 | Arieșul Turda | 5 | (0) |
| 2012–2013 | Castelldefels | 0 | (0) |
| 2013 | Gavà | 3 | (0) |
| 2014 | Novoperário | | |
| 2014 | Sant Andreu | 7 | (0) |
| 2015 | Boavista | 4 | (0) |
| 2017 | Moca | 17 | (0) |
| 2018 | Operário-MS | | |
| 2019 | Sinop | | |
- * Club domestic league appearances and goals

Jefferson de Souza Gonçalves (born 17 January 1988), known as Jefferson Arroz is a Brazilian professional footballer who plays as a midfielder for Sinop.

== Career ==
Jefferson Arroz had youth stints with Brasil Central, Cruzeiro, Cuiabá, Mixto prior to swapping Brazil for Italy in 2005 by joining Chievo. During his time with Chievo, Jefferson spent time out on loan with Ipatinga and former club Mixto. He departed Chievo in 2011, joining Liga II side Arieșul Turda in Romania. He made his debut on 20 August in a 2–0 defeat to Turnu Severin. Four further appearances followed during the 2011–12 season, which the club left mid-season. After Arieșul Turda, between 2012 and 2014, Jefferson spent time with Portuguesa and Novoperário in Brazil and in Spain with Gavà; the latter occurring in-between Portuguesa and Novoperário.

In August 2014, Jefferson Arroz agreed to join Sant Andreu of Segunda División B. He featured seven times for the club. Boavista of Rio de Janeiro, Brazil became Jefferson's ninth career club on 28 February 2015. He made his professional debut for the club on 14 March, featuring for twenty-five minutes of a Campeonato Carioca match with Barra Mansa. He left Boavista in 2015 after four appearances. Two years later, in January 2017, Jefferson completed a move to the Dominican Republic to play for Moca. In 2018, Jefferson returned to Brazil with Operário. In the succeeding year, Jefferson moved to Sinop of Série D.

== Career statistics ==
As of 3 April 2019.

Club statistics
| Club | Season | League | | | Cup | | League Cup | | Continental | | Other | | Total | |
| Club | Season | Division | Apps | Goals | Apps | Goals | Apps | Goals | Apps | Goals | Apps | Goals | Apps | Goals |
|---|---|---|---|---|---|---|---|---|---|---|---|---|---|---|
| Chievo | 2008–09 | Serie A | 0 | 0 | 0 | 0 | — | | — | | 0 | 0 | 0 | 0 |
| Chievo | 2009–10 | Serie A | 0 | 0 | 0 | 0 | — | | — | | 0 | 0 | 0 | 0 |
| Chievo | 2010–11 | Serie A | 0 | 0 | 0 | 0 | — | | — | | 0 | 0 | 0 | 0 |
| Chievo | Total | | 0 | 0 | 0 | 0 | — | | — | | 0 | 0 | 0 | 0 |
| Arieșul Turda | 2011–12 | Liga II | 5 | 0 | 0 | 0 | — | | — | | 0 | 0 | 5 | 0 |
| Sant Andreu | 2014–15 | Segunda División B | 7 | 0 | 0 | 0 | 0 | 0 | — | | 0 | 0 | 7 | 0 |
| Boavista | 2015 | Campeonato Carioca | — | | 0 | 0 | — | | — | | 4 (Note: Appearance(s) in Campeonato Carioca) | 0 | 4 | 0 |
| Moca | 2017 | Liga Dominicana | 17 | 0 | — | | — | | — | | 0 | 0 | 17 | 0 |
| Operário-MS | 2018 | Campeonato Sul-Mato-Grossense | — | | 0 | 0 | — | | — | | 0 | 0 | 0 | 0 |
| Sinop | 2019 | Série D | 0 | 0 | 0 | 0 | — | | — | | 0 | 0 | 0 | 0 |
| Career total | | | 29 | 0 | 0 | 0 | 0 | 0 | — | | 4 | 0 | 33 | 0 |
