= Richard Johnson (entrepreneur) =

American businessman (born 1961)

- Born: February 2, 1961 (age 65); Danville, Pennsylvania.
- Education: Bucknell University (B.A.)
- Occupations: Entrepreneur, Investor, Philanthropist
- Years active: 1988-Present
- Organization: Turtle Cove
- Known for: Hotjobs.com
- Notable work: Masonboro.org, Swanspoint, Penderlea Farms, Burgaw Now

Richard Johnson (born February 2, 1961) is an American businessman. As one of the first Silicon Alley pioneers, he started Hotjobs.com in 1996. He is also known for his philanthropic work, including founding Masonboro.org and Burgaw Now.

== Early life ==
Richard Johnson was born on February 2, 1961, in Danville, Pennsylvania. His parents were Berda Stout and John Van Wirt Johnson. Through his mother he is a descendent of Penelope Stout, who was a colonist of New Jersey in the 1660s. At the age of 11, Johnson moved with his family to New Jersey. After attending three different high schools in five years, Johnson studied at Bucknell University, where he was a member of Kappa Sigma fraternity. He graduated in 1984 with a B.A. in Political Science. In February of the following year, Johnson acquired his first job with Summit Staffing Partner s after answering their ad in the New York Times. Starting at $150/week, Johnson remained in their employ until December 1987, when he left to embark on his own business ventures.

== Business career ==
=== Early career ===
In January 1988, Johnson co-founded the RBL Agency with computer engineer Columbia graduate, Bennett Carroccio. RBL Agency, a specialized recruiting firm for technologists, was the first company to have a classified advertisement in The New York Times with an email address in 1993 and then a website in 1995. The agency went on to become OTEC Inc., one of New York City's largest technical recruiting firms. In 1997 OTEC Inc. opened its second office in San Francisco. By 1999, OTEC Inc. had over 65 recruiters in New York and San Francisco.

After seeing the success of his online efforts in 1995, Johnson realized the internet would be the biggest business opportunity in his lifetime; thus, he began to focus on building an internet company. His early efforts included creating New Media Labs, a Silicon Alley-based research and development firm, to construct technology for the Internet. Some of his first projects included building the largest transactional system in the world for Columbia House Records and network monitoring solutions for Merck Pharmaceuticals in early 1996.

=== HotJobs ===
Johnson soon realized he was conducting more project-based work than anything else and came to see the significance of the Internet in the workplace. It was then that Johnson, with help from Carroccio, started developing OTEC Inc.’s website into the job board that would later become HotJobs.com. By February 1996, the web site was launched as a separate company and HotJobs was established as the world's first truly interactive job board, where companies could post job openings directly onto the World Wide Web and applicants could interact with them via the simple click of a button..

As the founder and CEO of HotJobs, Johnson’s first advertising efforts included posting HotJobs as Yahoo!’s “site of the week” – an ad that could be purchased for $1,000 at the time. But, what he did next has been described as one of the “10 Gutsiest Moves in Entrepreneurial History.” In 1999, Johnson startled the advertising world when he mortgaged his house and other assets to spend $2 million on a single commercial ad during Super Bowl XXXIII, considering HotJobs’ total revenues were approximately $4 million at the time. It proved to be a very savvy investment, as over $50 million in publicity was generated when news broke about Johnson’s 30-second spot. Immediately following its air time, HotJobs' servers were overwhelmed with requests and overnight Johnson had transformed his company into a giant.

In May 1999, Johnson completed his first round of financing through a venture capital firm, Generation Partners, and then immediately filed to take his company public. On August 16, Johnson completed the 1st IPO of HotJobs, which he later followed up with a secondary offering in November 1999; his efforts succeeded in raising over $165 million in 1999 from outside public investors.

In March 2001, when Johnson realized his vision for the company was at odds with his board of directors, he stepped down as CEO and President of HotJobs, but remained an active chairman on the board. The next month, Johnson approached Andrew McKelvey, the CEO of TMP Worldwide Inc. and struck a deal to sell HotJobs to the owner of Monster.com. The transaction inevitably failed to close after the Federal Trade Commission (FTC) launched an Antitrust Case against the merger, allowing Yahoo to make an unsolicited bid and ultimately acquire HotJobs in February 2002 for $436 million.

=== Swanspoint ===
In 2014, Johnson bought the old Hatteras Yachts Plant in Swansboro, North Carolina, and anchored the facility, now under the name Swanspoint, with two core tenants, Armstrong Marine and Winter Custom Yachts. Swanspoint is now a boat manufacturing facility and full-service marine park.

In July 2022, Johnson successfully sold the marine manufacturing facility spanning over 60 acres, situated on the Intracoastal Waterway, to Marine Max.

=== Penderlea Farms ===
In 2016, Johnson bought a 575 acre farm in Burgaw, North Carolina, and started Penderlea Farms. Johnson purchased the farmland with a goal to grow and preserve historic Live Oak trees, namingly those mentioned in the Live Oaks Society—one of which was the Airlie Garden Live Oak, famously rooted in Wilmington, North Carolina. Johnson intends to carry on the DNA of these heirlooms into new generations.

== Philanthropy ==
In the following months of 2002, Johnson moved to Jackson Hole, Wyoming, shifting his focus on raising his family and helping non-profit organizations (NPO). Meanwhile, Johnson took a position on the board at The Old Wilson Schoolhouse. As an active board member, he implemented a fundraising campaign to restore the building, brought in an anchor tenant The Pumpkin Patch Preschool that transitioned the community center into a concrete educational tool, and developed a monthly speaker program relying on Jackson Hole’s most famous citizens.

=== WildAid ===
In 2005, Johnson joined the board of WildAid, a wildlife conservation group, eventually assuming the roles of Trustee and chairman. He enlisted Emily Hickey, a former employee of Hotjobs, to serve as the chief operating officer (COO) of the global NGO. Initially founded by four individuals, Emily strategically restructured WildAid, assigning two founders to concentrate on utilizing marketing campaigns to drive change. One of their most impactful taglines reads: “ When the buying stops, the killing will too.” This tagline was used in an effort to stop the illegal trade of killing endangered species.

=== Masonboro.org ===
In 2005, Johnson became a member of the Bucknell Alumni Board and after moving he and his family to Wilmington, North Carolina, became a member of UNCW’s Cameron School of Business Executive Advisory Board. In 2009, Johnson co-founded Masonboro.org to preserve and protect Masonboro Island, the largest barrier island in North Carolina. With Masonboro.org, Johnson developed the Island Explorers Program (ILX), an educational component through partnerships with the NC Coastal Reserve, Carolina Ocean Studies and New Hanover County Schools. ILX created a science-based field trip that would pair with the curriculum of 5th grade science objectives. The first of the ILX trips launched in Fall of 2013 with 50 students from Wrightsville Beach Elementary. Since then, the program has grown to bring in over 2000 students from every eligible school in New Hanover County.

By 2023, the program reached a significant milestone of 10,000 students completing the ILX trip.

=== Trout Unlimited ===
Johnson’s other non-profit work has included serving as a Trustee and Chairman on the Marketing Committee for Trout Unlimited between 2010 - 2018. During his years on the board for TU, Johnson helped grow their membership from 150,000 members to over 300,000 members.

=== Burgaw Now ===
In 2019, Johnson started the town revitalization project, Burgaw Now, aimed at investing in businesses to revitalize Burgaw’s historic town square. After purchasing several buildings downtown, Johnson partnered with Jay Kranchalk, a former Cape Fear Academy teacher, to open Fat Daddy’s Pizzeria. The business opened in 2020. Johnson then partnered with Kevin and Emmaline Kozak to open Burgaw Brewing, the town's first Brewpub in March 2023. In 2023, Johnson was honored with the David Brinkley Award by the Historic Wilmington Foundation in recognition of his exceptional large-scale preservation efforts. The award highlighted his work on projects such as Burgaw Now, live oak conservation at Penderlea Farms, and Masonboro.org.

=== Own Your Own ===
Founded in 2022, Own Your Own (OYO) comes as a culmination of Johnson’s two greatest passions: helping entrepreneurs and giving back to the community. OYO is designed to give hopeful entrepreneurs the opportunity to connect with investors, open small businesses and help revitalize historic downtowns. Expanding upon the work of Burgaw Now, OYO launched a nationwide restaurant challenge at the end of 2022 to give away a restaurant space in Burgaw, NC and up to one million dollars to outfit the space. The challenge attracted over 500 applicants from across the U.S. and Canada, each with their own concept and vision for the space. The goal of the competition was to find the best fit for the town of Burgaw and to provide the opportunity of ownership for an eager entrepreneur. On Oct 19, 2023, 24 finalists arrived in Burgaw to compete in a series of challenges that would help determine the winner. This included a Town-Square Cookoff where 200 community members cast their votes for their favorite concepts, as well as a number of challenges hosted by award-winning area chef judges. On October 29, Karoline Schwartz of Tabernash, Colorado was named the winner of the first OYO Nationwide Restaurant Challenge.

Shortly after the conclusion of the competition, Schwartz decided not to proceed with the restaurant in Burgaw. OYO has since shifted gears and is now planning for two restaurant openings by 2026. Runner-up Vincent Mangual, a beloved figure in town, will relocate from New York to Burgaw to establish a deli/marketplace on W. Fremont Avenue. Meanwhile, Khristen Hunter, the local restaurant standout from the top six will spearhead a southern farm-to-table restaurant on W. Courthouse Avenue.

OYO continues to explore opportunities to connect entrepreneurs with opportunities to open businesses that can help to revitalize small towns.

== Public Image ==
Johnson is widely recognized as a leading expert in both the recruiting and marketing fields, as well as a pioneer in the Internet business world. His efforts in Super Bowl XXXIII that took HotJobs from the 270th most recognized brand on the internet to the 6th most recognized overnight have cemented his reputation in entrepreneurial successes. Johnson’s success has led to a slew of interviews from all major print, digital, and on-air network news programs, including The Today Show, Good Morning America, NBC Nightly News, ABC World News Tonight, CNN, USA Today, Washington Post, New York Post, and Wall Street Journal as he frequently attracts media for interviews and quotes. Johnson has used his expertise to help Masonboro.org, and most recently, Burgaw Now, achieve significant brand awareness in each of their markets.

== Personal life ==
Johnson is a member of multiple country clubs, including Eagles Mere Country Club and Cape Fear Country Club. He enjoys fly fishing and has traveled internationally to fish.

Johnson and his wife, Carole, have four daughters: Virginia, Margaret, Lilli and Caroline.
