= McKelvey (disambiguation) =

McKelvey is a surname.

McKelvey may also refer to:

- McKelvey (horse), a racehorse
- McKelvey Valley, a valley in Antarctica
- Mount McKelvey, a mountain in Antarctica
- McKelvey Foundation, an American charitable organization
