= Michael Pfleger =

American Catholic priest and social activist (born 1949)

The Reverend Father Michael Pfleger
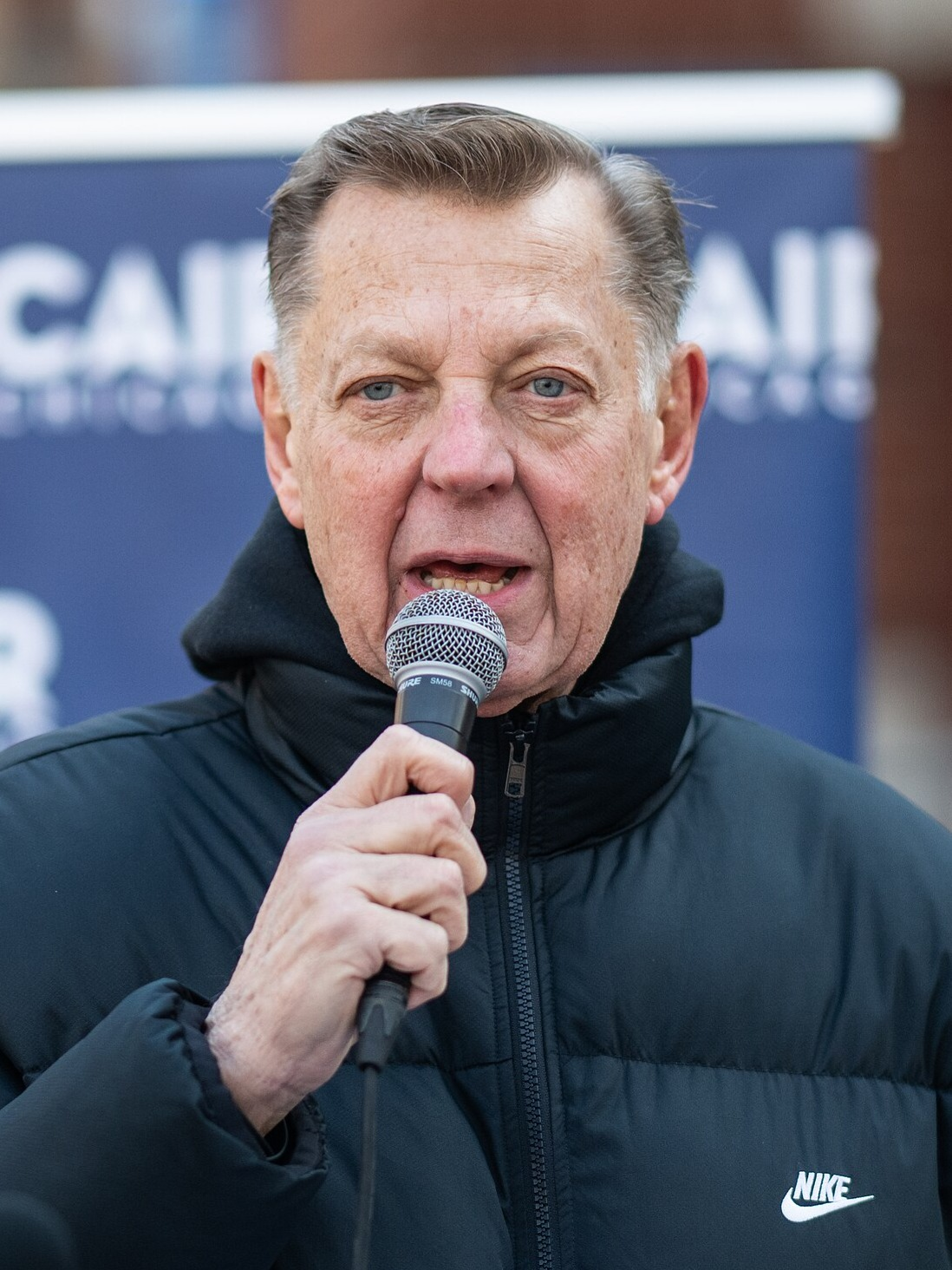
- Pfleger in 2026
- Born: Michael Louis Pfleger; May 22, 1949 (age 77); Chicago, Illinois, U.S.
- Education: Loyola University Chicago, Archbishop Quigley Preparatory Seminary, University of Saint Mary of the Lake.
- Occupations: Priest, social activist

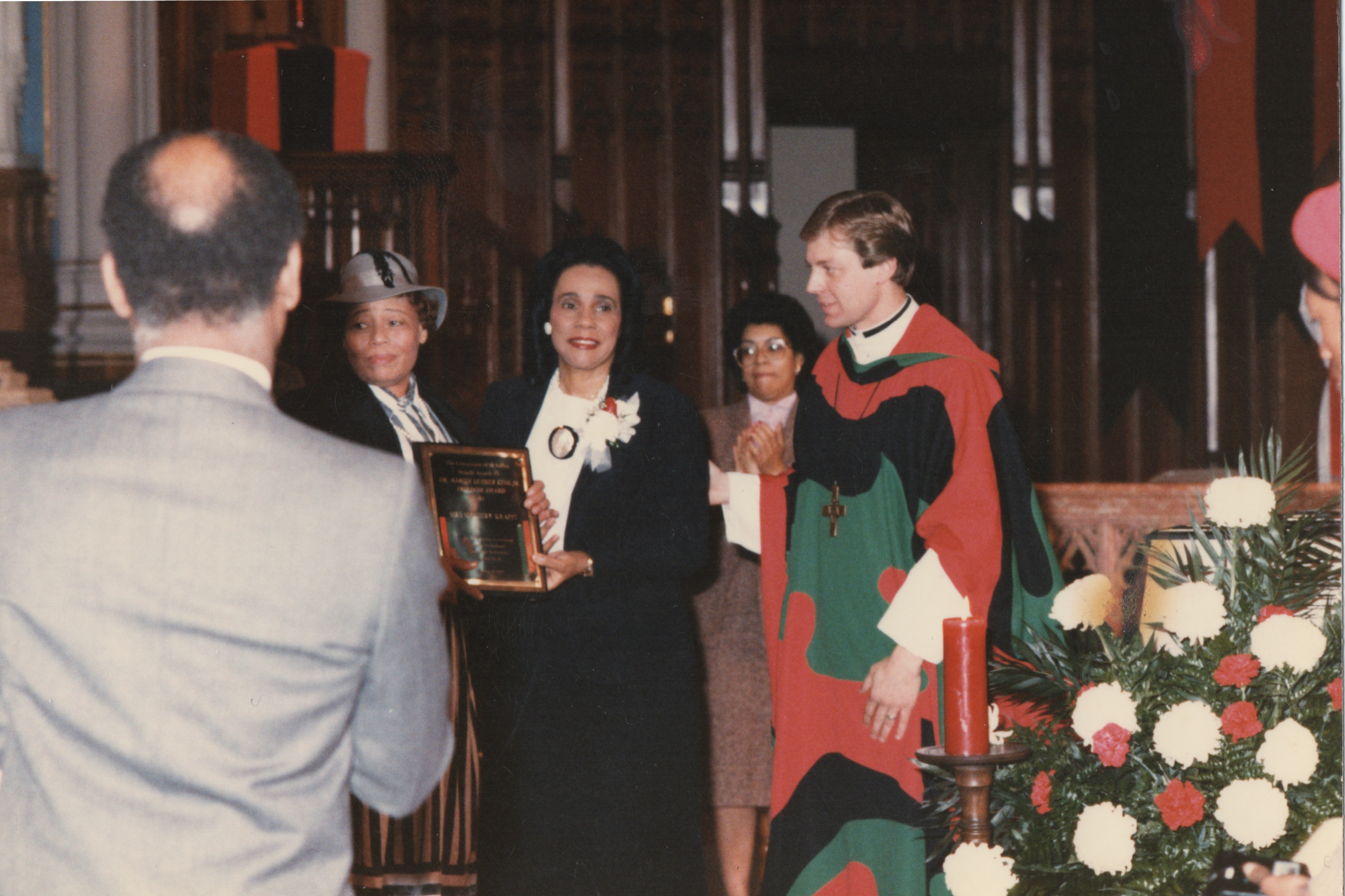
Coretta Scott King receiving award from Fr. Michael Pfleger (right)

Michael Louis Pfleger (born May 22, 1949) is an American Catholic priest and social activist located in Chicago. Since 1981, he has been pastor of St. Sabina Catholic Church, a Black parish in Chicago's Auburn Gresham neighborhood.

He has been the subject of a number of controversies, mostly involving his public comments and activities.

Pfleger has also been the subject of multiple sex abuse allegations, including three in 2021 and one in 2022 which were found to be unsubstantiated by the Archdiocese of Chicago. Another allegation was made in 2026.

== Biography ==
=== Background ===
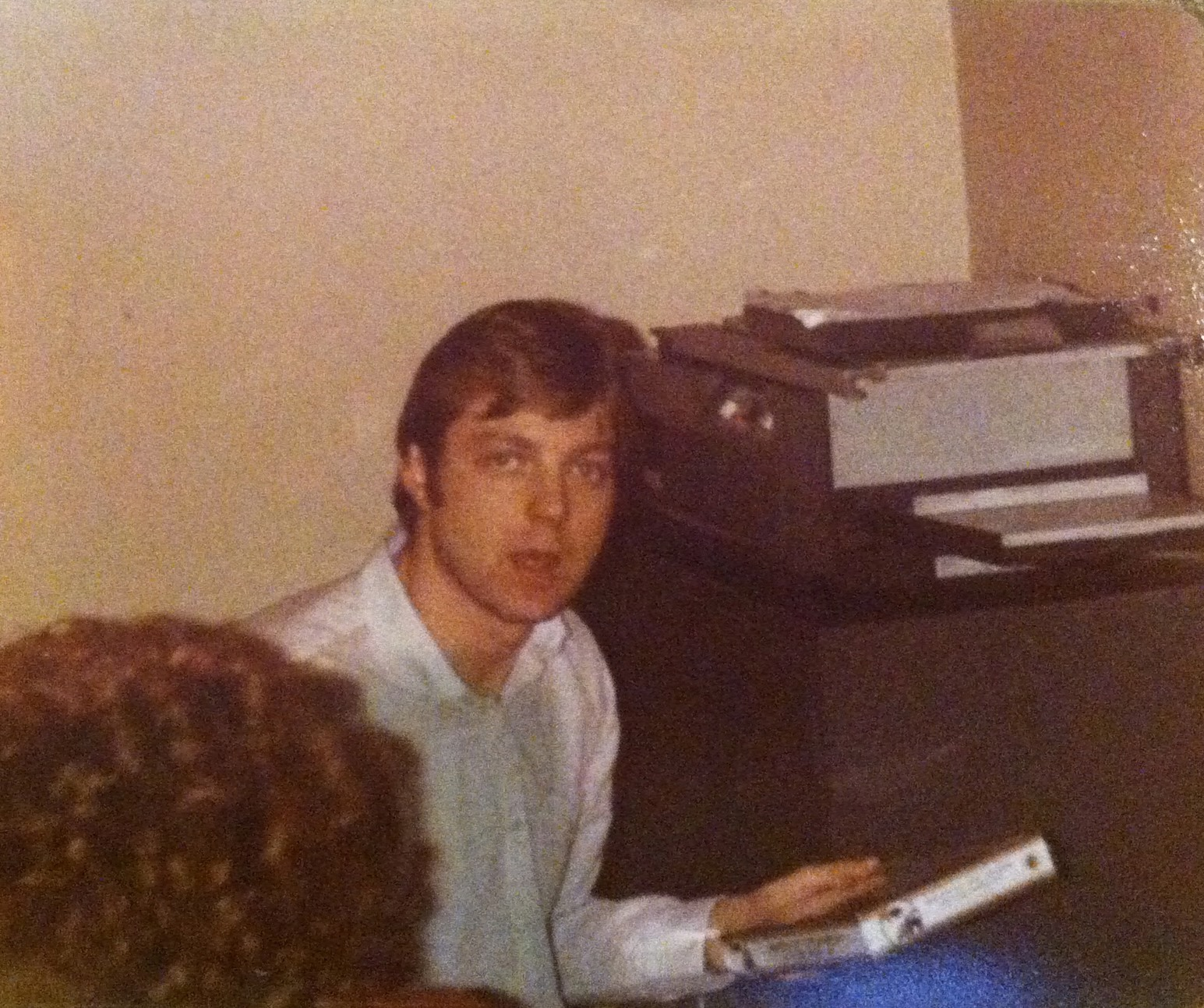
Fr. Pfleger circa 1980

A German American from the South Side of Chicago, Pfleger attended Archbishop Quigley Preparatory Seminary South, Loyola University and the University of Saint Mary of the Lake. He was ordained a priest for the Roman Catholic Archdiocese of Chicago on May 14, 1975.

=== Parish ministry ===
Since 1981, he has been pastor of the mostly African American parish of Saint Sabina, a Catholic church in Chicago's Auburn Gresham neighborhood. His uninterrupted tenure in just one parish is normally unheard of in a diocese where pastors usually serve for only six to twelve years. When he was appointed to his present position, at age 31, he became the youngest pastor in the Chicago archdiocese. Under his leadership, Saint Sabina has established an Employment Resource Center, a Social Service Center and also an Elders home. In May 2025, at the insistence of Chicago Cardinal Blase Cupich, he celebrated the 50th anniversary of his ordination with an all-day event that included a gun turn-in and gunlock giveaway, the distribution of 400 boxes of free food, and an afternoon carnival for kids.

=== Social activism ===
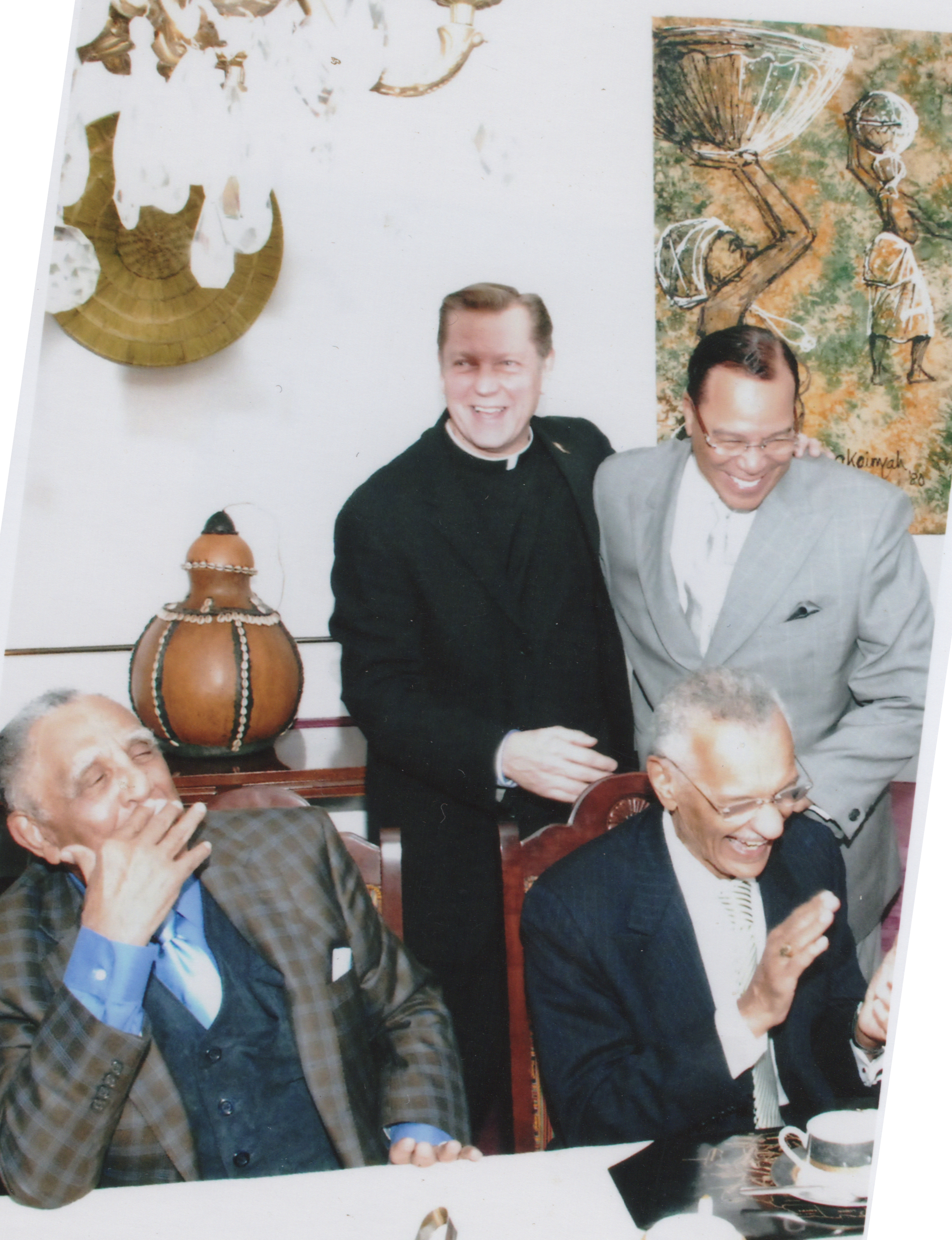
Fr. Michael Pfleger, Rev. Joseph Lowery, Min. Louis Farrakhan and C.T. Vivian

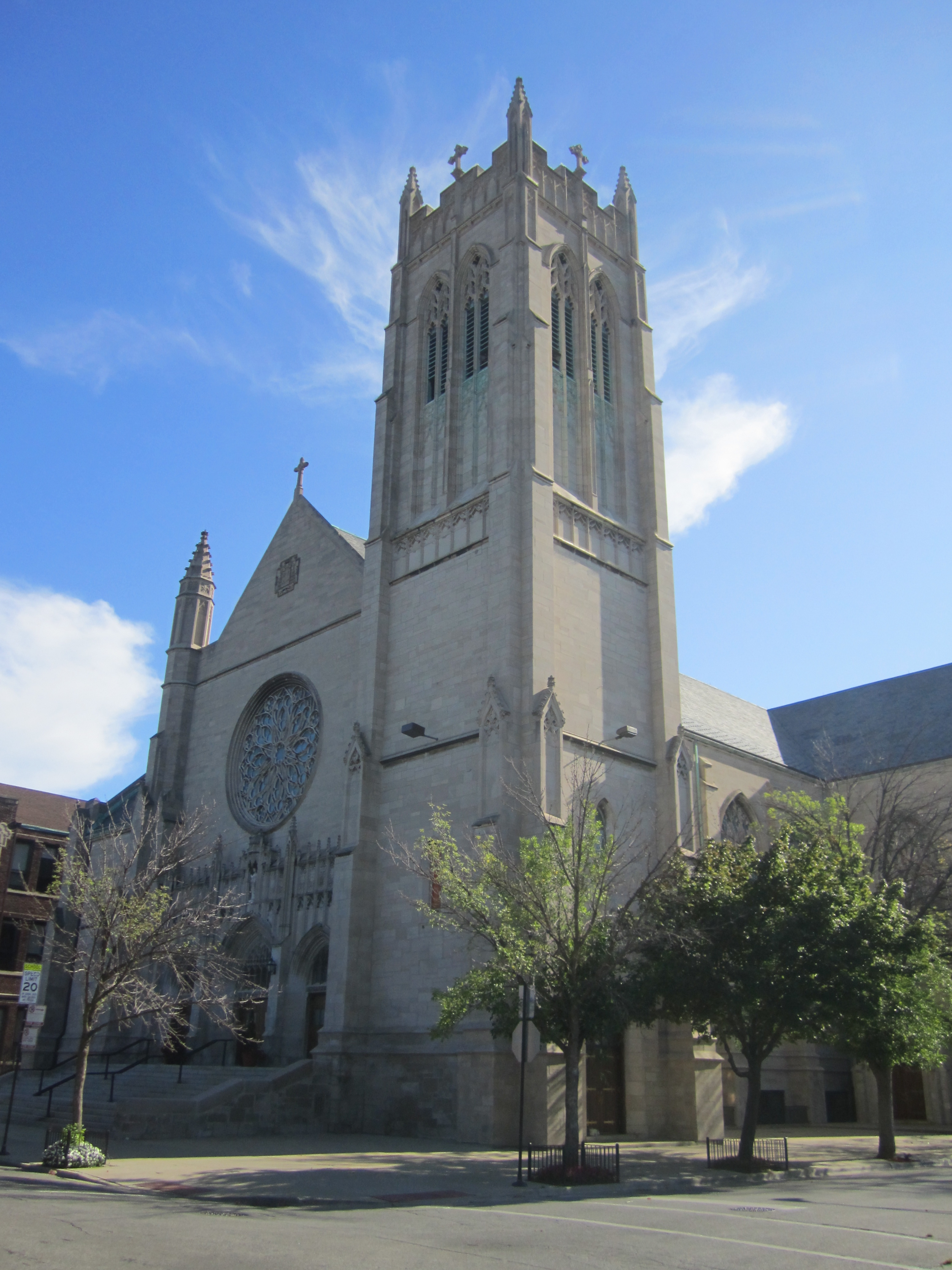
St. Sabina Church, Auburn Gresham, Chicago

Pfleger's social activism has brought him media coverage throughout Chicago and beyond. He has often collaborated and associated with African American religious, political and social activists such as Jeremiah Wright, Joseph Lowery, Jesse Jackson, Harry Belafonte, Cornel West and Louis Farrakhan.

=== Anti-drug campaigns ===
Under Pfleger's leadership, the community of St. Sabina demanded the shutdown of a number of Auburn Gresham businesses specializing in drug paraphernalia. His parish also campaigned for the removal of tobacco and alcohol billboards from their neighborhood. When billboard owners refused to cooperate in the early 1990s, he and others decided to climb ladders and deface the signs. He was charged with destruction of private property, but was acquitted by a jury in 1991.

In September 1997, the Chicago City Council voted 44–1 to eliminate tobacco and alcohol billboards from selected areas in Chicago. Pfleger described the decision as "a tremendous victory for the children of Chicago, for our neighborhoods, especially black and Hispanic neighborhoods."

=== Jerry Springer and Howard Stern ===
Pfleger has become one of the best known critics of The Jerry Springer Show, a controversial television program which was videotaped in Chicago. Believing the program to be immoral, he and his parishioners began picketing outside the show's studios in 1991. By 1998, he had organized a boycott of the show's advertisers. "[Springer is] glorifying violence every day.... Calling a woman a ho and a bitch is sick. This is not normal behavior", he declared. The show's producers eventually claimed that they would attempt to decrease the number of on-stage fights on the program.

Pfleger later targeted radio personality Howard Stern in response to Stern's late 2005 advertising campaign to promote his move to satellite radio. Pfleger specifically objected to a pair of Stern's billboards in Chicago that featured an image of the black power salute with the caption "Let freedom ring. And let it be rung by a stripper", a parody of a line in Martin Luther King Jr.'s 1963 "I Have a Dream" speech. Pfleger told the media, "As we prepare to celebrate Dr. King's birthday, we will not tolerate this kind of disrespect. We should not have to tolerate it in our communities." Viacom, the owner of the billboards, eventually removed the signs due to the protests.

Pfleger received criticism from Stern's fans, who questioned Pfleger's commitment to freedom of speech. Jesse Jackson came to Pfleger's defense, saying, "There are two freedoms at issue here. They have the right to advertise, and we have the right to resist it in our community. Sometimes freedom is challenged by a community's tolerance level. I think Father Pfleger is a man of great dignity and has an acute social conscience. And he deserves our support."

=== Outreach to sex workers ===
In 2000, Pfleger received international attention for encouraging his parishioners to buy time from prostitutes as a means of inviting the women to counseling and job training.

The Chicago Archdiocese largely distanced itself from Pfleger's activities, to which he responded, "How is what I'm doing not part of the gospel? The church leaders talk about evangelization. Well, if this isn't evangelization, I don't know what is." Saint Sabina raised several thousand dollars for his program, attracting many donors from outside their parish. St. Sabina has used similar methods to reach out to drug dealers.

=== Southside Catholic Conference controversy ===
In 2001, Pfleger fired racism accusations towards a mostly-white primary school athletic league, the Southside Catholic Conference, after they refused to admit Saint Sabina's parish school. The league claimed that visiting teams and parents would be unsafe in Saint Sabina's neighborhood. He responded, "Racism continues to be alive and well both inside society and inside the church. To be denied admission on the sole premise that certain coaches and parishes feared for the safety of their children is illegitimate, ridiculous, and insulting. It is very troubling that the conference would insinuate that we would place their children in harm's way." Chicago's Cardinal Francis George eventually pressured the league to reverse its decision.

=== Billboards against disrespectful rappers ===
In 2007, Pfleger and his Saint Sabina parishioners erected twenty billboards across Chicago with the words "Stop Listening To Trash", followed by a list of "disrespectful rappers", which included Fat Joe, Lil Wayne, Nelly, 50 Cent, G-Unit, Twista, Snoop Dogg and Ludacris. Pfleger said in a press release, "If we are going to end the violence and disrespect of women, we must fight every form of negativity, including the music industry." He explained to WMAQ-TV's Alex Perez, "When you disrespect women and you continue to demean a community or race by names and by language, that's unacceptable. ... We can kill with our words."

=== Pfleger and Jeremiah Wright ===
On March 28, 2008, Pfleger invited Jeremiah Wright, former pastor of then-U.S. Senator and presidential candidate Barack Obama, to deliver a blessing at Saint Sabina during a visit by poet Maya Angelou. Wright had been criticized by Obama, academics and political pundits on the left and right for several controversial sermons, but Pfleger came to Wright's defense. "I wanted him to come here so he could see that people really stand with him and support him while he's under all this attack. America, unfortunately, has been really cheated of knowing the real Dr. Wright," said Pfleger.

In a statement on Saint Sabina's website, Pfleger wrote, "Dr. Wright is one of the great biblical scholars of our country and the best of preachers in the prophetic tradition. Dr. Wright has been shamefully demonized by 30 second sound bites that have tried to re-define him into someone other than who he is."

== Controversy ==
=== Al Sharpton ===
In February 2003, Pfleger generated controversy by inviting Al Sharpton to speak at a Mass during Black History Month celebrations. Cardinal Francis George disapproved of Sharpton's appearance, due to Sharpton's pro-choice stance on abortion. Since Sharpton was a presidential candidate at the time, archdiocese officials were concerned that having a political candidate speak in church would cause them to lose their tax exemption. However, George decided that trying to stop Sharpton from coming "would be a futile gesture and a waste of effort".

Of his disagreements with George, Pfleger once said, "I can only assume the Cardinal sees my style of ministry to be something he doesn't agree with. In that sense, he sees me as a thorn. That's what I'm left to feel like. I don't revel in that. In fact, it's very difficult. It's a very difficult feeling [being] on the fringe, getting public reprimands, public criticisms. I don't enjoy that at all. [But] my focus right now is to try to continue building up the Church. A lot of what we do is [considered] out of the ordinary. That kind of puzzles me. It's not the Church I grew up in. The Church then was very involved in justice and civil rights issues."

=== Gun control advocacy ===
==== Chuck's Gun Shop campaign ====
In 2007, Pfleger and Jesse Jackson led a campaign protesting against Chuck's Gun Shop & Range. According to the Americans for Gun Safety Foundation, Chuck's Gun Shop & Range had sold over 2,000 weapons that were traced to crimes committed between 1996 and 2004. During one protest, Pfleger and Jackson were arrested by Riverdale police for blocking the entrance to the store. Both were later released without charge.

In May 2007, during a Rainbow/PUSH Coalition protest outside Chuck's Gun Shop & Range, Pfleger was accused of threatening the life of the owner, John Riggio. The Illinois State Rifle Association released a tape where Pfleger was heard telling the assembled crowd, "He's the owner of Chuck's. John Riggio. R-i-g-g-i-o. We're going to find you and snuff you out… You know you're going to hide like a rat. You're going to hide but like a rat we're going to catch you and pull you out." Pfleger later claimed his use of the phrase "snuff you out" had been misinterpreted.

Cardinal George rebuked Pfleger, saying, "Publicly delivering a threat against anyone's life betrays the civil order and is morally outrageous, especially if this threat came from a priest." Pfleger claimed that he did not intend to use the word "snuff" as a slang term for "kill", but rather as a substitute for "pull", as he used later in his statement.

==== Unlicensed armed bodyguard ====
On May 27, 2018, Eugene Hale, a member of Pfleger's security detail was arrested outside St. Sabina when officers noticed him brandishing a pistol. Upon investigation, the officers discovered that Hale did not possess a concealed carry license and was not legally licensed to carry a weapon in public nor to own the weapon as he did not possess Firearm Owner's Identification (FOID).

=== Controversy during 2008 presidential election ===
On May 25, 2008, Pfleger gave a sermon at Trinity United Church of Christ, then presidential candidate Barack Obama's church, where he made controversial statements concerning Senator Hillary Clinton, Obama's opponent for the Democratic Party nomination.

Pfleger said, "I really believe that she just always thought, 'This is mine. I'm Bill's wife. I'm white, and this is mine. I just gotta get up and step into the plate.' Then out of nowhere came, 'Hey, I'm Barack Obama,' and she said, 'Oh, damn! Where did you come from? I'm white! I'm entitled! There's a black man stealing my show!'" He then pretended to wipe tears from his face, a reference to Clinton's emotional speech before the New Hampshire primary, and added, "She wasn't the only one crying. There was a whole lot of white people crying."

After hearing about Pfleger's remarks, Obama said he was "deeply disappointed in Pfleger's divisive, backward-looking rhetoric". Pfleger later released a statement through St. Sabina that read, "I regret the words I chose Sunday. These words are inconsistent with Sen. Obama's life and message, and I am deeply sorry if they offended Sen. Clinton or anyone else who saw them."

On May 31, 2008, Obama resigned his membership in Trinity Church, saying that his campaign had caused the church to receive excessive media attention. On June 1, 2008, Pfleger released a longer apology to the St. Sabina parish regarding the incident and its aftermath.

On June 3, 2008, Cardinal George asked Pfleger to take a disciplinary leave of absence from St. Sabina. George said in a statement, "I have asked Father Michael Pfleger, Pastor of St. Sabina's Parish, to step back from his obligations there and take leave for a couple of weeks from his pastoral duties, effective today. Fr. Pfleger does not believe this to be the right step at this time. While respecting his disagreement, I have nevertheless asked him to use this opportunity to reflect on his recent statements and actions in the light of the Church's regulations for all Catholic priests. I hope that this period will also be a time away from the public spotlight and for rest and attention to family concerns." Pfleger resumed his parish duties on June 16, 2008.

=== Suspension ===
On April 27, 2011, the homepage of the website of the Archdiocese of Chicago released a statement from Cardinal Francis George in the form of a letter, temporarily suspending Pfleger from administering any of the sacraments (save for the administration of the Sacrament of Penance in an emergency, which even laicized or excommunicated priests may do) and from his active ministry as pastor of St. Sabina's Parish.

Cardinal George had suggested Pfleger take the position of president at Chicago's Leo Catholic High School, but Pfleger said he would consider leaving the Catholic Church if forced to leave his parish. Cardinal George replied, in part, "If that is truly your attitude, you have already left the Catholic Church." Cardinal George lifted the suspension on May 20, 2011.

=== Louis Farrakhan ===
In May 2019, Pfleger invited Farrakhan, the leader of the Nation of Islam to speak at Saint Sabina—a controversial act in and of itself, made even more newsworthy by Farrakhan's supposedly disparaging comments about Jews during the address. The event was reportedly in response to Farrakhan's being banned from Facebook.

Cardinal Blase Cupich thereafter apologized, reprimanded Pfleger for inviting Farrakhan to speak at the church, and asked Pfleger to visit the local Holocaust Museum to reflect.

=== Child sexual abuse allegations ===
On January 5, 2021, the Archdiocese of Chicago announced that Pfleger was removed from active ministry due to an allegation of sexual abuse of a minor, occurring over 40 years earlier. By January 25, another alleged victim had come forward, the brother of the first.

On March 3, 2021, a third person alleged that Pfleger provided him with alcohol and marijuana before sexually assaulting him. Unlike the other accusers, the victim was an 18-year-old man.

On May 24, 2021, following an investigation, the Archdiocese of Chicago said Pfleger would be reinstated as pastor. Cardinal Cupich wrote: "The review board has concluded that there is insufficient reason to suspect Father Pfleger is guilty of these allegations."

On October 15, 2022, another abuse allegation was reported and Pfleger again stepped away from ministry pending an investigation. The individual making the accusation stated that the abuse took place in the church rectory during practices of the Soul Children of Chicago Choir. In a letter to his parishioners, Pfleger denied the allegations and noted that they were brought by the same attorney that represented his previous alleged abuse victims. He also published a letter from an attorney representing the Soul Children of Chicago Choir, which supported Pfleger and noted that choir practices "always had chaperones and parent attendants watching over the children."

On December 10, 2022, the archdiocese announced that its investigation was complete and the charges could not be substantiated, and Pfleger was reinstated as pastor at St. Sabina.

On July 11, 2026, Pfleger was again placed on leave as the Archdiocese of Chicago investigated a fifth allegation against him, this time from a woman who attended the St. Sabina school from 1993 to 1995.

== Personal life ==
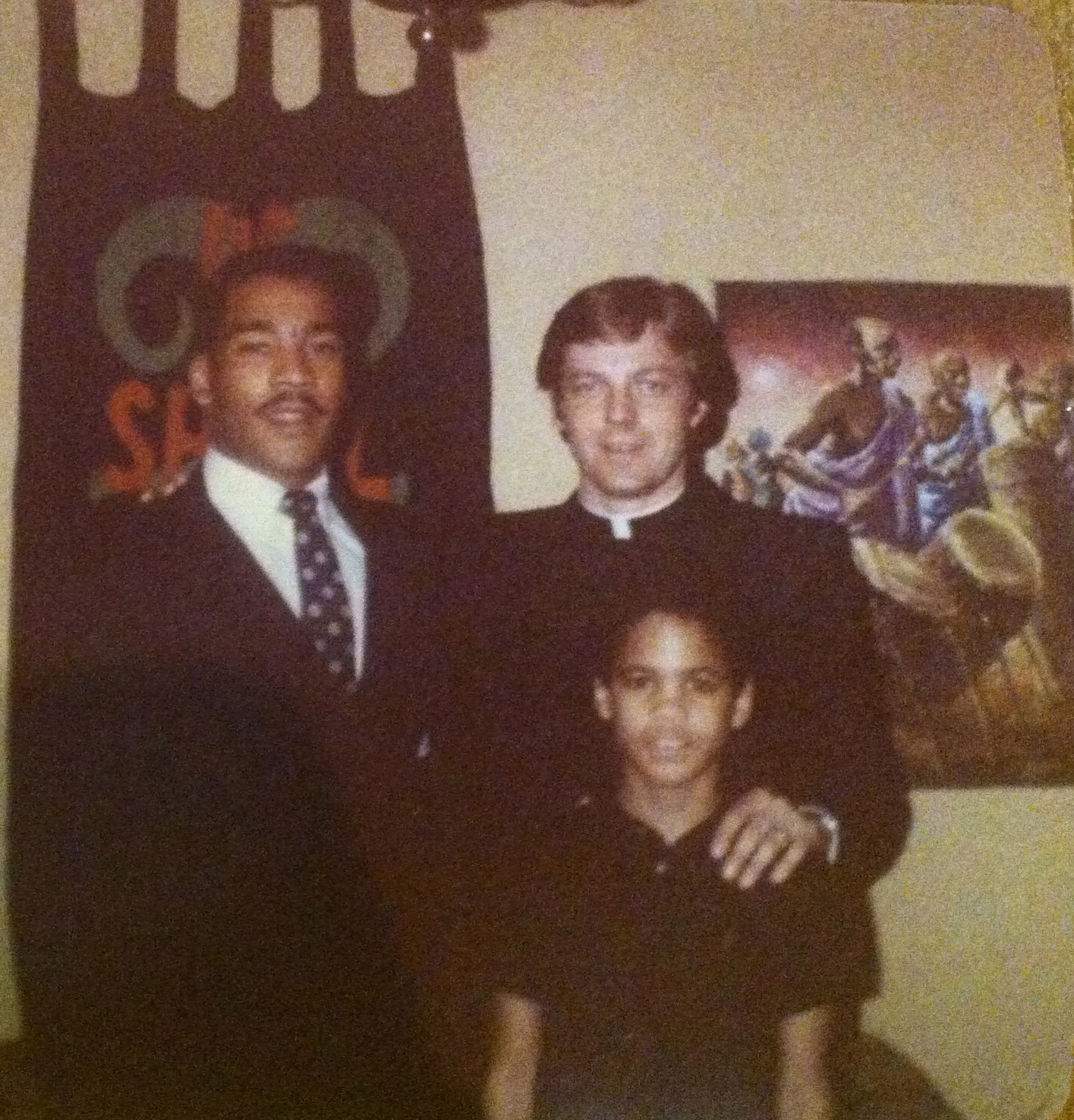
Fr. Pfleger with Dexter Scott King, and Pfleger's son Lamar

In 1981, Pfleger adopted an eight-year-old son, Lamar, in defiance of Cardinal John Patrick Cody, who had threatened to fire him if he went ahead with the adoption. Lamar graduated from college and got a job with Continental Airlines, which he lost after the September 11 attacks. He enlisted in the United States Army.

In 1992, Pfleger adopted another son, Beronti, who attended the University of Central Florida before his sudden death on May 20, 2012. Pfleger says his son had been coping with an illness the past few years.

In 1997, Pfleger became the foster father to Jarvis Franklin, who was killed by stray gunfire on May 30, 1998.

== In popular media ==
In 2009, a documentary film called Radical Disciple: The Story of Father Pfleger was released. It was directed by Bob Hercules.
