= Monster Employment Index =

Monthly analysis of online job demand

The Monster Employment Index was a monthly analysis of online job demand conducted by Monster.com, running from October 2003 through December 2012. Based on a monthly review of millions of opportunities culled from a large selection of corporate career sites and job boards, including itself, the Index presented a snapshot of employer online recruitment activity in the United States, Canada, and Europe. The Monster Employment Index (renamed to foundit Insights Tracker) is now managed by foundit.in (Formerly Monster.com) India for India , Middle east , Singapore , Malaysia and Philippines .

Because recruitment typically precedes actual hiring by a month or two, the Monster Employment Index was considered a labor market leading indicator and a rough gauge of the overall economy.

The U.S. Monster Employment Index was released the day prior to the Bureau of Labor Statistics' Employment Situation while the Monster Employment Index Europe was published on the second Tuesday of each month, with individual reports for the UK, Germany, France, Netherlands, Italy, Sweden, and Belgium. The Monster Employment Index Canada was released quarterly.

The index was discontinued in December 2012 by Monster US but continued for MONSTER India, Gulf and SEA region. Monster cited that as its business had moved past only online postings, the index no longer represented its business. The data is still stored by various data providers.

In 2026, Monster launched the Monster Research Institute, a research initiative focused on labor-market conditions and worker experiences. Its research includes the Monster Workforce Index, which tracks labor market activity, and the Monster Livelihood Index, which measures workers' economic security, career mobility, and future readiness.
