= Monster Inc. =

Monster Inc. may refer to:

- Monster Cable, an American company best known for audio and video cables
- Monster Worldwide, an American provider of employment services
- Monsters, Inc., a 2001 American animated comedy film
