= Callaway C12 =

American sportscar

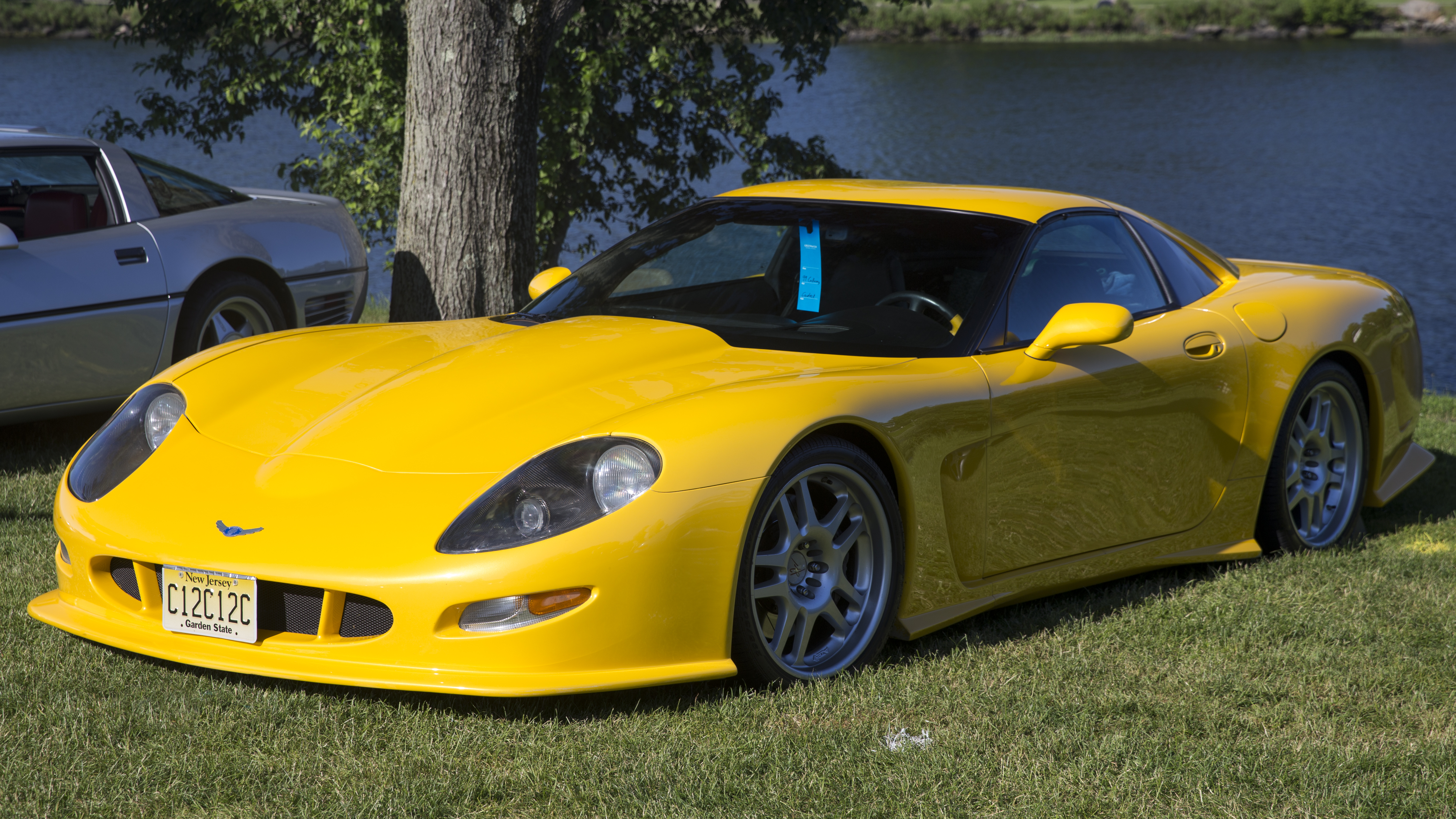

Overview
- Manufacturer: Callaway; IVM Automotive
- Production: 1998–2001; 20 produced
- Designer: Paul Deutschman

Body and chassis
- Class: Sports car (S)
- Body style: 2-door coupé; 2-door convertible; 2-door hardtop
- Related: Chevrolet Corvette (C5)

Powertrain
- Engine: 5.7 L LS1 OHV V8; 6.2 L LS6 OHV V8
- Transmission: 6-speed manual

Dimensions
- Wheelbase: 104.7 in (2,660 mm)
- Length: 191 in (4,900 mm)
- Width: 78.7 in (2,000 mm)
- Height: 47.1 in (1,200 mm)
- Curb weight: 1,480–1,565 kg (3,263–3,450 lb)

The Callaway C12 is a sports car, designed, developed and built by American manufacturer Callaway, between 1998 and 2001. It is based on the contemporary Chevrolet Corvette (C5), although unlike earlier Callaway efforts the bodywork was entirely different. The C12 retained the Corvette's glass and roof, door handles, and interior hardpoints.

== Specifications ==
The bodywork, designed by Paul Deutschman, is made of GRP and kevlar on a hydroformed steel skeleton. The bodywork was built by IVM Automotive of Germany. The design featured fixed headlights instead of the pop-up headlights on the C5 Corvette, as well as two taillights, taken from the Opel Tigra A, as opposed to the traditional four. The brakes are ventilated discs all around with four-piston calipers and an ABS system. The suspension is double control arms with coil springs over shock absorbers at all four corners. The interior featured complete leather-covered interiors dyed to the owner's specifications.

The C12 was either equipped with a 6.2 liter V8 engine, or a tuned version of the 5.7 liter LS1 used in the Corvette C5 with a number of modifications, many of which increased horsepower. The 5.7-liter "Supernatural" engine produces 440 hp (328 kW) at 6,300 rpm and 395 lb⋅ft (536 N⋅m) of torque at 4,400 rpm, with the later 6.2-liter version producing 482 hp (359 kW) at 6,100 rpm and 466 lb⋅ft (632 N⋅m) of torque. The larger LS6 engine was introduced after Chevrolet had introduced their more powerful Z06 derivative. Additionally, the C12 received modifications that enhanced handling capabilities. Callaway reported a 0-60 mph (97 km/h) time of 4.1 seconds and a top speed of 194 mph (312 km/h) for the 5.7 liter variant.

According to Callaway, the C12's were built "to a standard rather than a cost", and the company lost money on every car. C12s were sold to high-profile customers such as Dale Earnhardt Jr., Otis Chandler, Andrew McKelvey, Ely Callaway, Rick Hendrick and Tommy Mottola buying the car. Reportedly, 19-20 cars were produced, including two 2-door cabriolet "Speedster" models, and one fixed-roof coupe.

== IVM C12 ==
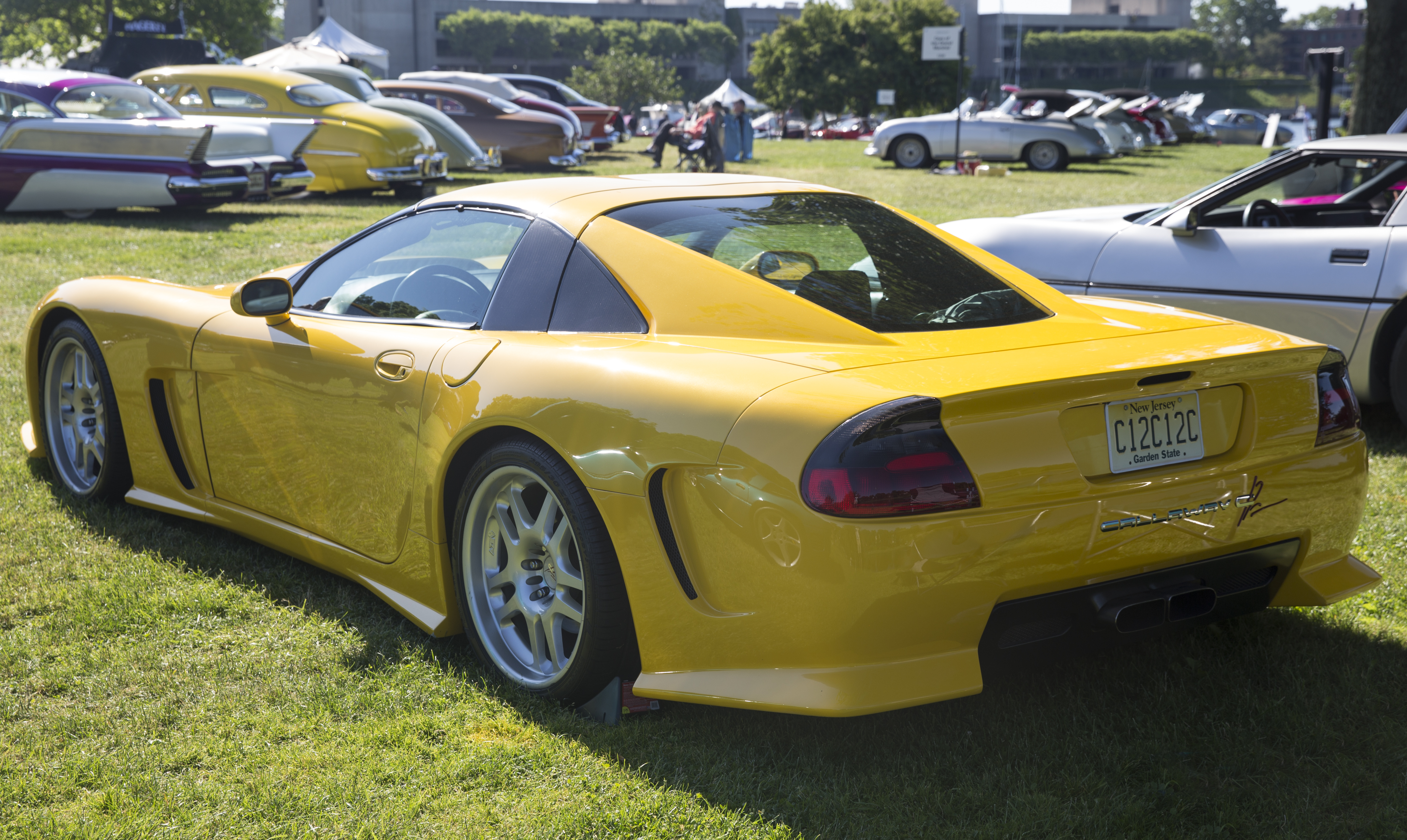
Callaway C12 rear

In Germany, the sports car model was built in Bad Friedrichshall by IVM Automotive (a part of the Ingenieurbüro für Verfahrenstechnik und Maschinenbau) as the IVM C12. The German version was available as a Coupé, Hardtop, or Cabriolet. It was offered as a small range model with the 5.7-litre V8, but tuned to 400 PS (294 kW) in European specs. In 2000, IVM added a 440 PS (324 kW) engine to the range. The IVM model was built from 1998 up to 2003. The prices for the IVM C12 ranged from 350,000 up to 370,000 DM.

== Racing ==
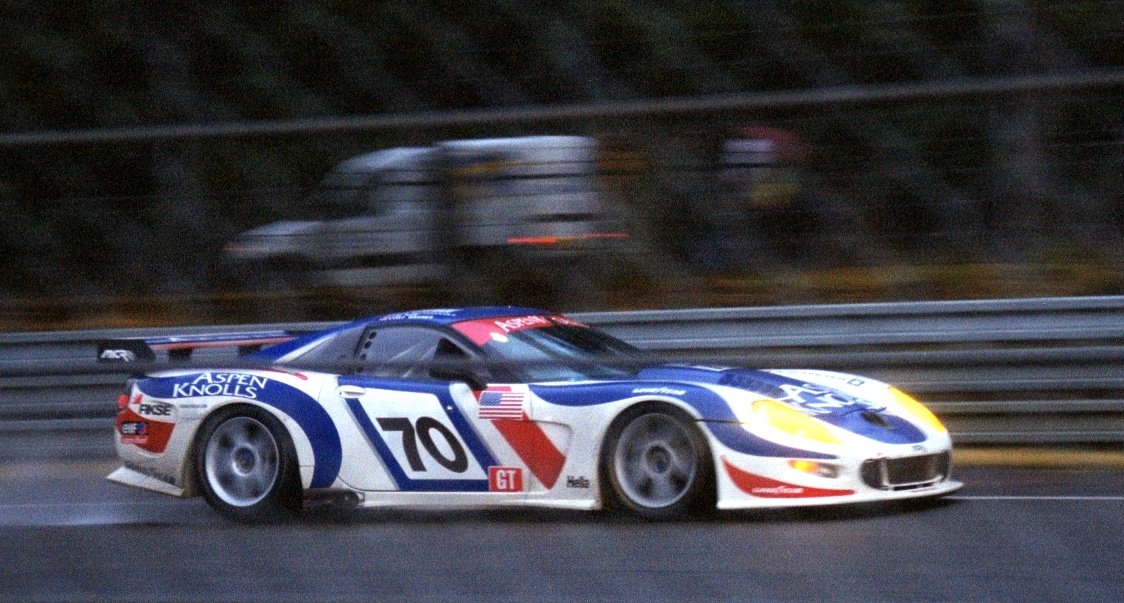
Callaway C12-R at the 2001 24 Hours of Le Mans

From 1997 to 2001, Reeves Callaway sought to compete in the GT2 Class at the famous 24 Hours of Le Mans with a racing version of the C12, the C12-R. The race car's crowning achievement was a pole position in 2001.
