= McKelvey =

McKelvey is a surname. Notable people with the surname include:

- Andrew McKelvey (1934–2008), American businessman
- Frank McKelvey (1895–1974), Irish painter
- Frank McKelvey Bell, Canadian soldier and writer
- George McKelvey (lawman), constable of Charleston, Arizona Territory
- George McKelvey (mayor), American politician
- George McKelvey (soccer), American soccer player
- Gerald McKelvey, American politician
- Grant McKelvey, Scottish rugby union coach and player
- Houston McKelvey (born 1942), Irish Anglican dean
- J. J. McKelvey (born 1980), American football player
- Jack Marston McKelvey (born 1941), American bishop
- Jim McKelvey (born 1965), American computer scientist
- Joan McKelvey, Canadian judge
- Joe McKelvey (died 1922), Irish republican
- John McKelvey (1847–1944), American baseball player
- Miguel McKelvey (born 1973/74), American billionaire
- Richard McKelvey (1944–2002), American political scientist
- Rob McKelvey (born 1969), American golfer
- Robert McKelvey, American football coach
- Susan Delano McKelvey, American botanist (1883-1964)
- Tara McKelvey, American journalist
- Trish McKelvey (born 1942), New Zealand cricketer
- Vincent Ellis McKelvey (1917–1987), American geologist
- William McKelvey (1934–2016), British politician
