= Chevrolet Corvette (C5) =

Fifth generation of the Corvette sports car

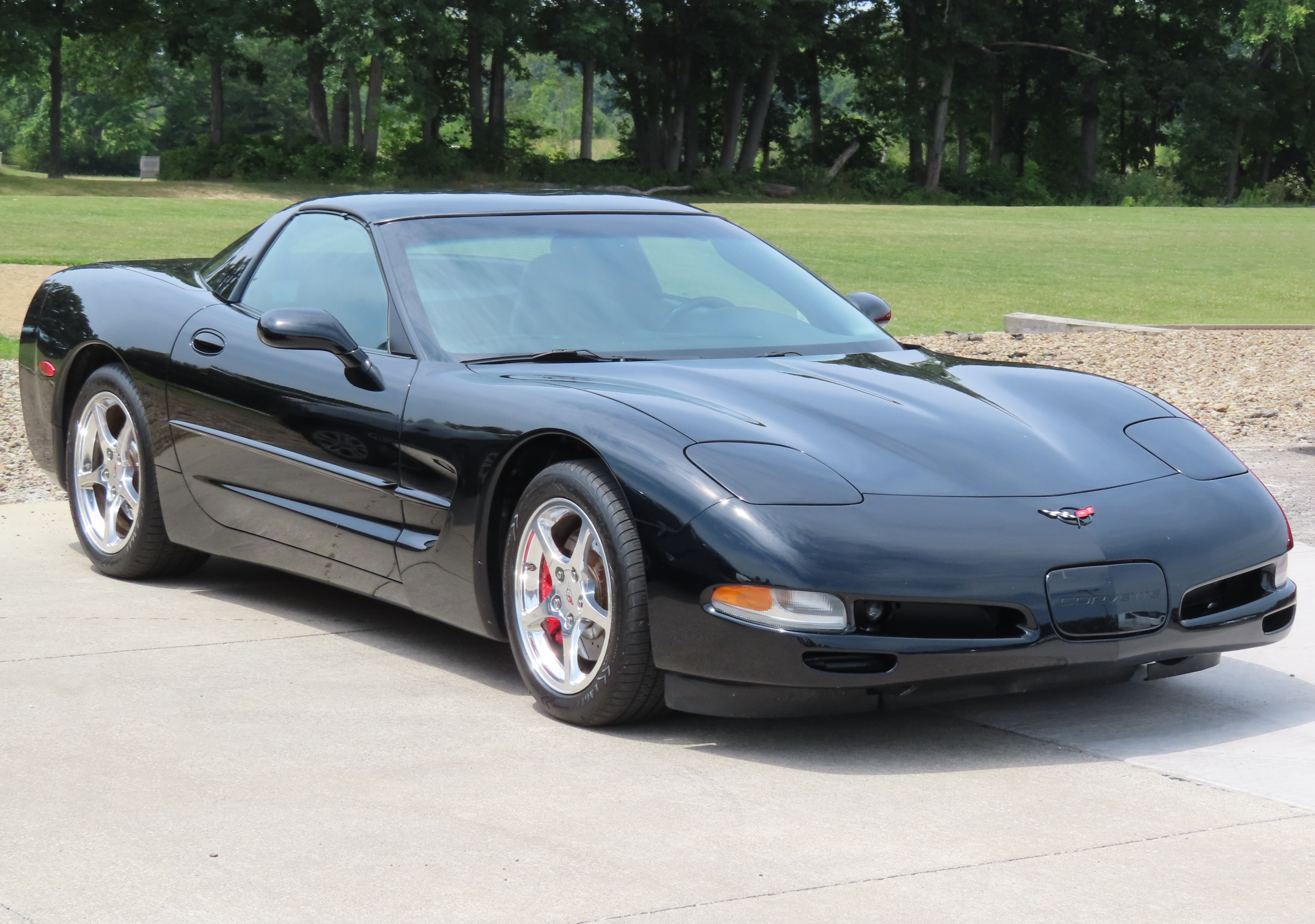

Overview
- Manufacturer: Chevrolet (General Motors)
- Production: October 1, 1996 – July 2, 2004
- Model years: 1997–2004
- Assembly: United States: Bowling Green, Kentucky (Bowling Green Assembly Plant)
- Designer: John Cafaro (1993)

Body and chassis
- Class: Sports car (S)
- Body style: 2-door coupé (1997–2004); 2-door convertible (1998–2004); 2-door hardtop (1999–2004)
- Layout: Front mid-engine, rear-wheel-drive
- Platform: Y-body
- Related: Callaway C12

Powertrain
- Engine: 5.7 L LS1 V8; 5.7 L LS6 V8 (Z06: 2001–04)
- Transmission: 6-speed manual T-56; 4-speed automatic 4L60E

Dimensions
- Wheelbase: 104.5 in (2,654 mm)
- Length: 179.7 in (4,564 mm)
- Width: 73.6 in (1,869 mm)
- Height: 47.7 in (1,212 mm); Convertible: 47.8 in (1,214 mm)
- Curb weight: 1,472 kg (3,245 lb); Convertible: 1,473 kg (3,247 lb); Hardtop: 1,439 kg (3,172 lb)

Chronology
- Predecessor: Chevrolet Corvette (C4)
- Successor: Chevrolet Corvette (C6)

The Chevrolet Corvette (C5) is the fifth generation of the Corvette sports car, manufactured and marketed by the Chevrolet division of General Motors for model years 1997 – 2004. Production variants included the high-performance Z06. Racing variants included the C5-R, a 24 Hours of Daytona and 24 Hours of Le Mans GTS/GT1 winner. The C5 Corvette was the first GM vehicle to feature the third generation small block "LS" engines, and the last generation Corvette with pop-up headlights.

== Overview ==
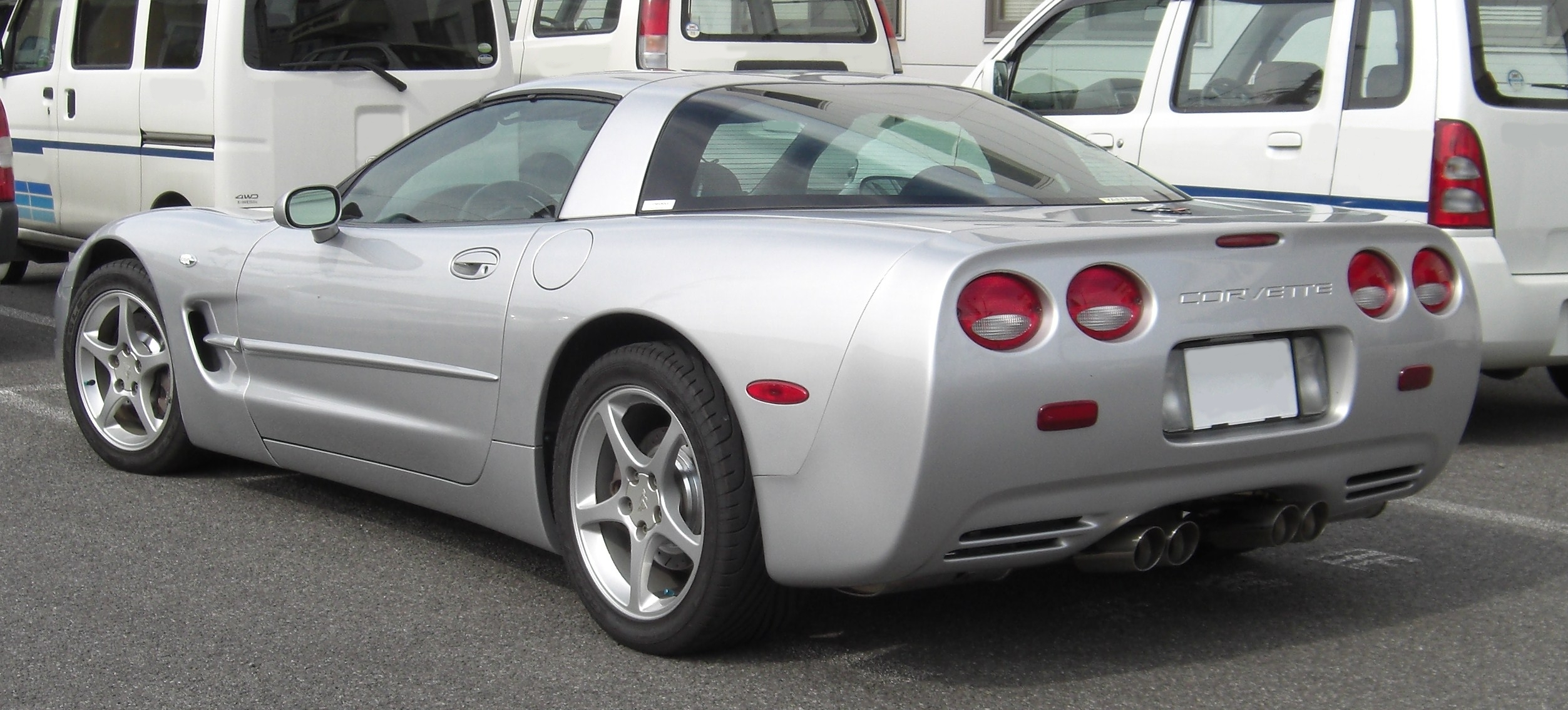
C5 Japan spec tail lights.

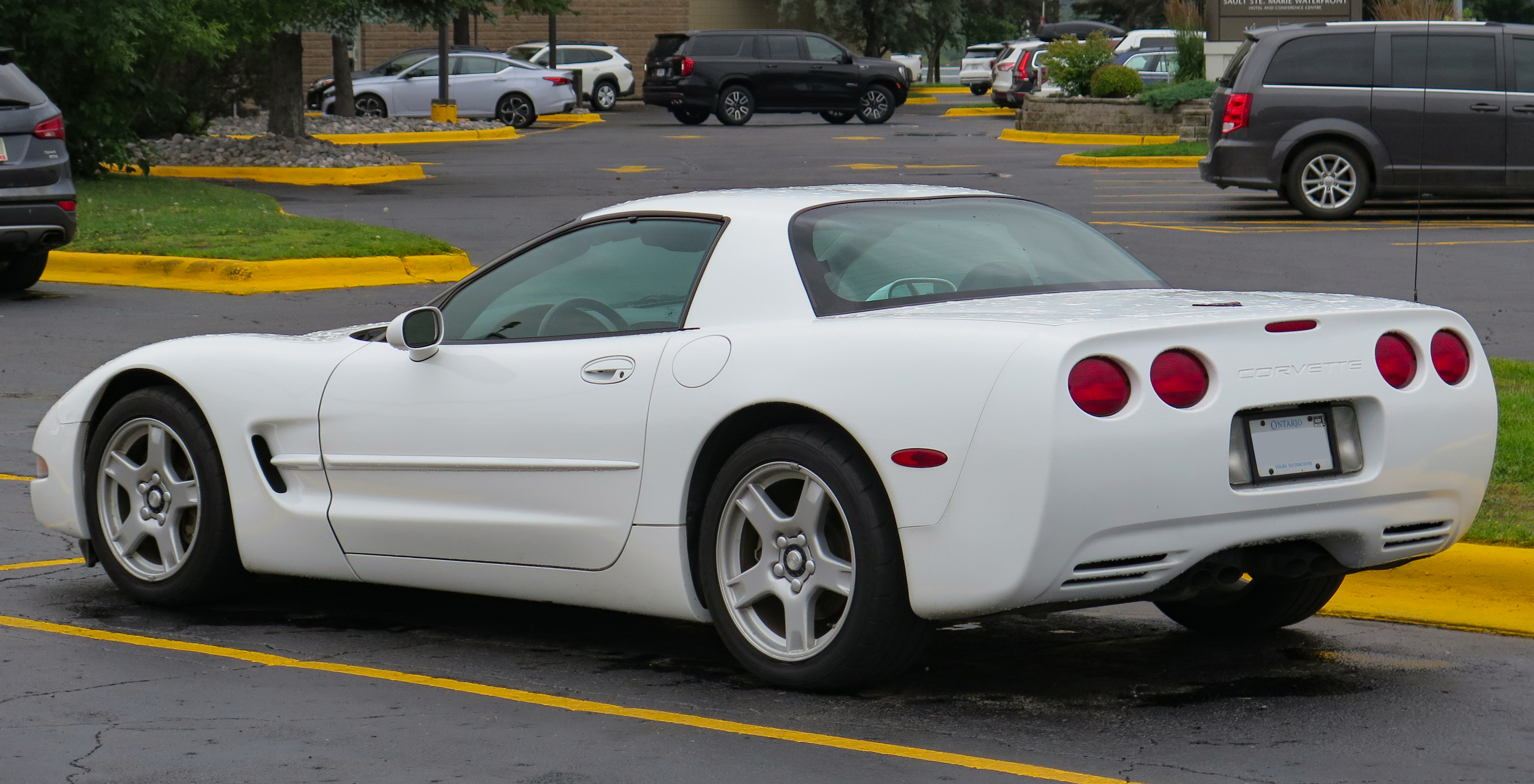
C5 hardtop

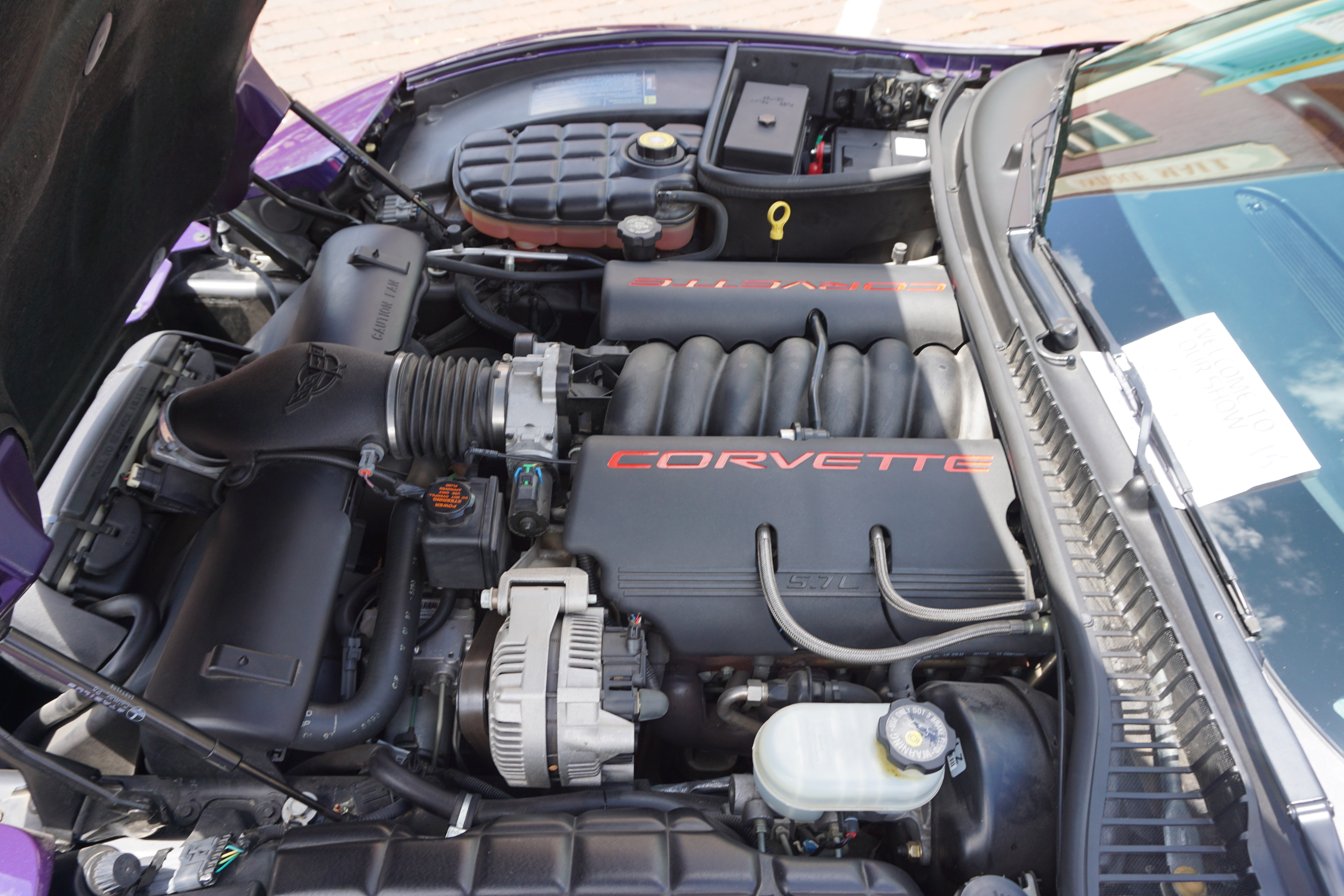
The LS1 V8 engine

The C5 was unveiled on January 6, 1997 at the North American International Auto Show in Detroit. The fifth generation was originally intended to debut in 1993 to celebrate the Corvette's 40th anniversary, but it was delayed by financial troubles and changes in staff within GM. A major change from its predecessor the C4, the C5 had a hydroformed box frame, a design that offered an improved structural platform, especially for a convertible bodystyle. To improve handling, the transmission was relocated to form an integrated, rear-mounted transaxle assembly. Connected to the all-new LS1 engine via a torque tube, the engine/transmission arrangement enabled a 50-50% front-rear weight distribution. The LS1 engine initially produced 345 hp (257 kW), subsequently increased in 2001 to 350 hp (261 kW). The 4L60-E automatic transmission carried over from previous models, but the manual was replaced by a Borg-Warner T-56 6-speed capable of a 282 km/h (175 mph) top speed. Relative to the C4, the new platform and structural design substantially reduced squeaks and rattles.

In the inaugural model year (1997), only the fastback coupé (more like a hatchback coupé) was offered, with the convertible – the first to offer a trunk since 1962 – following later in August 1997 for MY 1998. In the summer of 1998, a third bodystyle, the hardtop (also referred to as the "fixed-roof coupé" or "FRC"), was added to the 1999 MY lineup. This bodystyle, as its name suggests, featured a fixed top (no removable targa top panel as with the fastback coupé) with a roofline shape and trunk space similar to that of the convertible, as well as a distinctive notchback-style rear window.

Aside from cosmetic differences (new wheel styles, paint colors, pace car/commemorative editions in 1998, 2003, and 2004, etc.), engine power increase, and new offerings for optional equipment, there were few fundamental changes from one model year to the next within the production run of the C5. One of the more popular "high-tech" options introduced in the Corvette line was a head-up display or HUD, while another innovation was the Active Handling System (first available as an option for 1998, then standard on all 2001 models). The C5 was also the first Corvette to incorporate a drive-by-wire throttle; and variable-effort steering, whereby the assist level of the power steering is varied according to vehicle speed (more at lower speeds, less at higher speeds). The C5 generation was the first model to adopt the parallel or 'tandem' windshield wiper configuration, abandoning the opposed configuration that was used on every previous Corvette model since the first in 1953.

In contrast to the reputation of high-performance vehicles for poor fuel economy, the C5 achieves comparatively high EPA ratings of 18 mpg_{‑US} (13 L/100 km; 22 mpg_{‑imp}) / 25 mpg_{‑US} (9.4 L/100 km; 30 mpg_{‑imp}) mpg (city/highway) with the automatic transmission and 19 mpg_{‑US} (12 L/100 km; 23 mpg_{‑imp}) / 28 mpg_{‑US} (8.4 L/100 km; 34 mpg_{‑imp}) with the manual transmission, allowing it to avoid the "gas guzzler" tax that is levied against most other vehicles in the Corvette's class. A number of factors are responsible for this: the relatively light weight of the C5 (a curb weight under 3,300 lb (1,500 kg), Chevrolet going so far as to omit the spare tire as a weight-saving measure, relying upon run-flat tires instead), the C5's low drag coefficient, and the vehicle's tendency to upshift into the higher gears as soon as possible. The manual transmission's computer-aided gear shifting results in an obligatory shift from 1st gear directly into 4th gear under certain driving conditions; the system can be deactivated through PCM tuning or the use of an aftermarket device.

Suspension choices for the base model C5 were limited to the standard suspension (RPO FE1), with options for either the autocross-inspired FE3 Sport Suspension (included with the Z51 Performance & Handling Package and standard on the 1999–2000 FRC) or the F45 Selective Ride Control Suspension, which permitted "on-the-fly" driver selection of different ride characteristics (Tour, Sport, and Performance). Late in the production run (starting with the 2003 model year), the F55 Magnetic Selective Ride Control Suspension replaced the F45 as the third suspension choice. The racing-inspired FE4 suspension used for the Z06 is stiffer than any offered on the base model C5, and is unique to that model with no optional suspension offered. The C5's suspension consisted of independent unequal-length double wishbones with transverse fiberglass mono-leaf springs and optional magnetorheological dampers.

The C5 is considered competitive in regards to 0–60 mph (97 km/h) acceleration times with most premium sports cars of its era, including the Aston Martin DB7 Vantage, and the Ferrari 355. This speed is also competitive with a new 2026 Ford Mustang. A composite of published performance numbers for the base-model coupé and convertible gives a 0–60 mph time of around 4.5 seconds, and a standing quarter-mile time of around 13.3 seconds at 108 mph (both times for a vehicle equipped with the 6-speed manual transmission). Both the manual transmission and the automatic transmission had a top speed of around 175 mph, though many have found this to be a modest estimate, with some reporting speeds of 180 or more.

The C5's modular body panels use a lightweight composite material known in the automotive industry as SMC or Sheet Molded Composite, a type of fiberglass that is blended and bonded with resins. SMC provides better protection against direct impacts because it is very stiff and resists denting. The floor boards on the C5 are a composite consisting of SMC sandwiched with balsa wood. Balsa wood was chosen for its stiffness, light weight, and sound absorption qualities. The all aluminium LS1 overhead valve engine is much lighter than its bi-metal (cast iron block, aluminum heads) predecessor, the LT1, and provides for a much lower hoodline when compared to an overhead cam design of relative displacement. The composite leaf springs are much lighter and sit much lower than typical coil springs and help provide the C5 with its smooth ride characteristics and low ride height.

A license plate cover with the "Corvette" inscription on the front bumper for U.S. states without a mandatory license plate; the feature was inherited from the C4. The European version was equipped with additional lighting. Front parking lights were located in the bumper grille, nearby to the front fog lights (optional). The side marker lights remained, but the rear light became amber, turned on simultaneously with the front parking light. The front turn signals have lost their DRL function. Side turn signals were mounted on the fenders, and rear fog lights were mounted on the bumper. The rear license plate area, without reversing lights, accommodated a long license plate. The taillights had integrated turn signals and reverse lights.

Ending production on July 2, 2004, the C5 became both the last generation of Corvette, and alongside the Lotus Esprit (the last Esprit rolled off the production line on February 20, 2004), the last car overall to use pop-up headlamps.

== Z06 ==
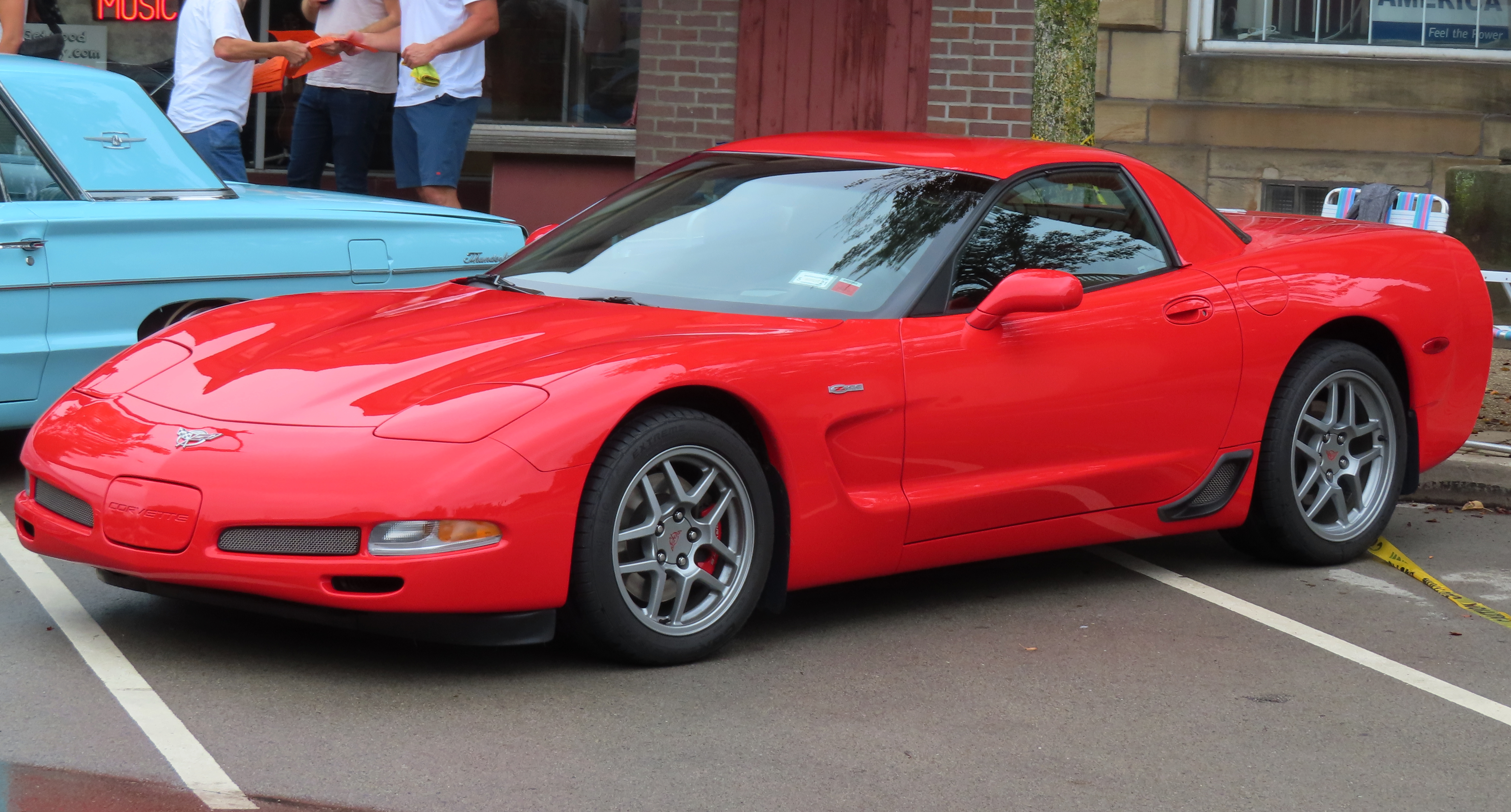
Chevrolet Corvette C5 Z06, with its distinctive black brake duct in front of the rear wheel and hardtop body style

A successor to the ZR-1 made its debut in 2001 as the Z06, giving a nod to the high-performance Z06 version of the C2 Corvette of the 1960s. The Z06 uses a tuned version of the standard LS1 engine (designated the LS6), with a higher power output of 385 hp (390 PS; 287 kW), later bumped to 405 hp (411 PS; 302 kW) starting in 2002. Although its total output was less than that of the previous late model ZR-1, the Z06 was much lighter, and could out-perform the ZR-1 in every category except top speed. It also cost substantially less than the ZR-1. The Z06 had a total curb weight of 3,118 lb (1,414 kg). The Z06 model was only available with the six-speed manual transmission.

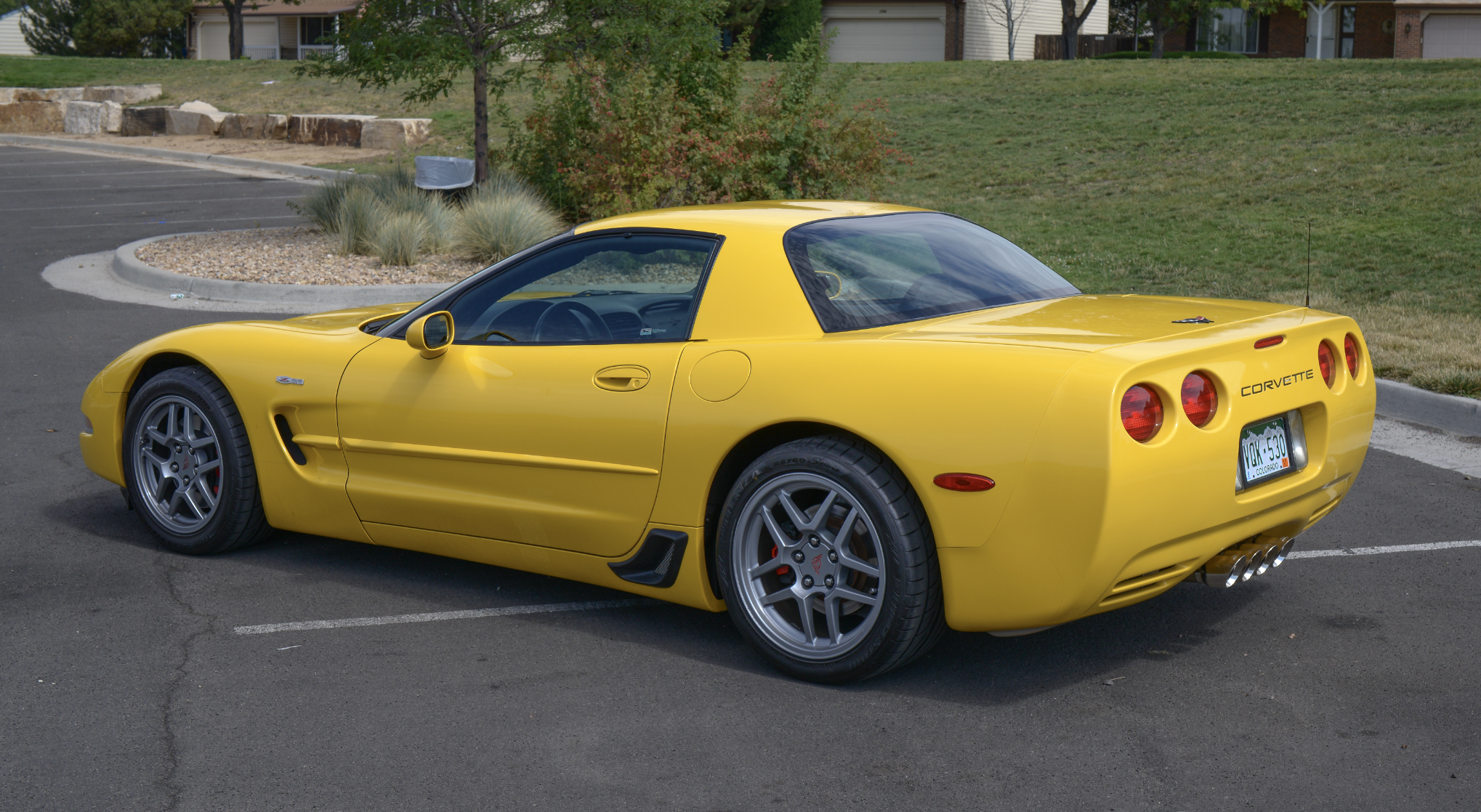
2002 Chevrolet Corvette Z06 in Millennium Yellow, showing the fixed roof body style.

Chevrolet engineered several modifications for the Z06 to put the increased power to its best use, starting with the most structurally rigid bodystyle — the hardtop or FRC (Fixed Roof Coupé). The new components added to the Z06 included: uprated FE4 suspension, larger wheels and tires, revised gearing ratios, and functional brake cooling ducts. The Z06 is 128 lb (58 kg) lighter than a standard C5 hatchback coupe due to weight-saving measures such as a titanium exhaust system, thinner glass, lighter wheels, non-EMT tires, reduced sound proofing, fixed rear radio aerial, and a lighter battery. Starting with the 2002 model year, power was increased to 405 hp (411 PS; 302 kW) at 6,000 rpm and 400 lb⋅ft (542 N⋅m) of torque at 4,800 rpm, due to a larger air intake, stiffer valve springs, lighter sodium-filled valves, more aggressive camshaft lift and timing, and a less restricted exhaust that eschewed the use of pre-catalytic converters.

The 2004 Z06 Commemorative Edition was equipped with a carbon fiber hood, saving an additional 10 lb (5 kg) of weight. Other unique characteristics of the Z16 (Commemorative Edition Z06) are the polished aluminum wheels, special paint color and striping, commemorative-edition badging and wheel center caps. The Z16 also received revised shock damping tuning for improved handling. The Z16 option accounted for the majority of Z06 Corvettes in 2004, totaling 2,025 units, with 325 units shipped overseas.

The performance figures for the 405 hp (411 PS; 302 kW) version of the Z06 include an acceleration time from 0–60 mph (97 km/h) in 3.9 seconds and 11.9 seconds in the 1/4 mile (402 m) as tested by GM High-Tech Performance magazine in October 2004. The top speed of the Z06 has been recorded to be 171 mph (275 km/h).

== Known issues ==
Common failure points on all C5 Corvettes include the hazard switch, fuel tank level sensors (requires cleaning due to dirty gas sulfur deposits), and steering column lock message (an aftermarket fix exists).

Other issues are tied to some parts that are no longer produced, and not necessarily reliability of parts. The Electronic Braking Control Module (EBCM) for example, is a part no longer produced by GM. On C5 Corvettes made before 2001, a failing ECBM module must be replaced outright. Model year 2001 and newer C5 Corvettes can have their EBCMs serviced in some, but not all, cases.

Some 2004 Corvettes have a redesigned dual fuel tank system which makes repair very labor intensive and expensive.

Valve spring failures are known to affect late production 2002-mid 2003 Z06s. The permanent fix is replacing the original yellow valve springs with inexpensive redesigned OEM GM valve springs, or with aftermarket valve springs.

== Special editions ==
=== Indianapolis 500 Pace Car Replica ===
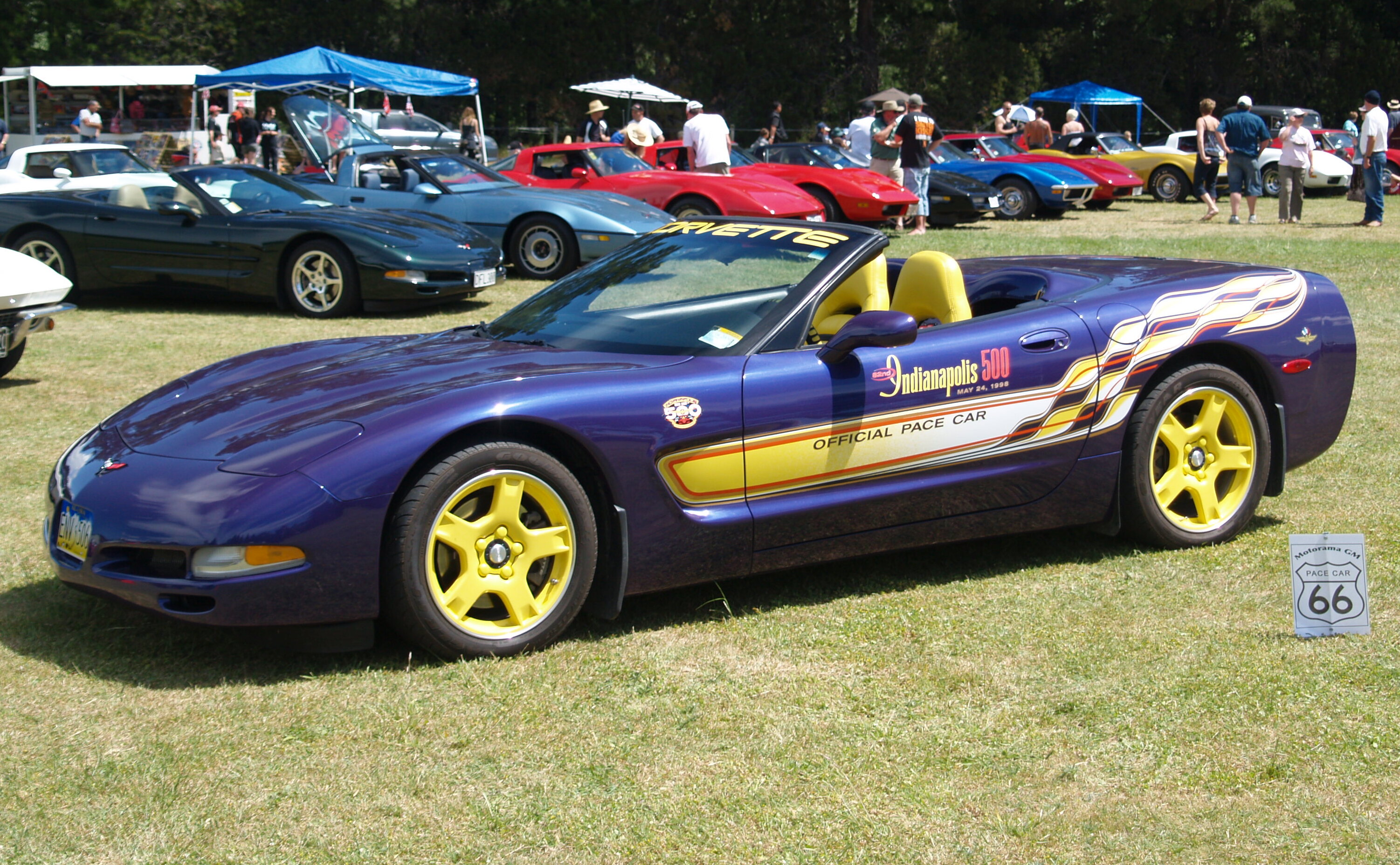
1998 Corvette Indy 500 Pace Car Replica

In 1998, the newly introduced convertible version of the C5 was chosen as the Pace Car for the Indianapolis 500 race, and a Pace Car Replica (RPO Z4Z) was offered to the public. Aside from lacking the equipment necessary for actual pace car duties (light bar, special racing harnesses, etc.), there was little difference between the Pace Car Replica C5 and the vehicle that actually saw duty during the race. The Pace Car Replica package consisted of a special paint color ("Radar Blue"), unique interior colors (black and yellow), painted yellow wheels, and special pace car decals. The Pace Car Replica package also included other optional equipment: the newly introduced Active Handling System (RPO JL4); an electronically tuned AM/FM radio with CD player and a Bose speaker system; an electronic dual-zone heating & air conditioning system; and leather adjustable sport bucket seats.

=== 50th Anniversary Edition ===
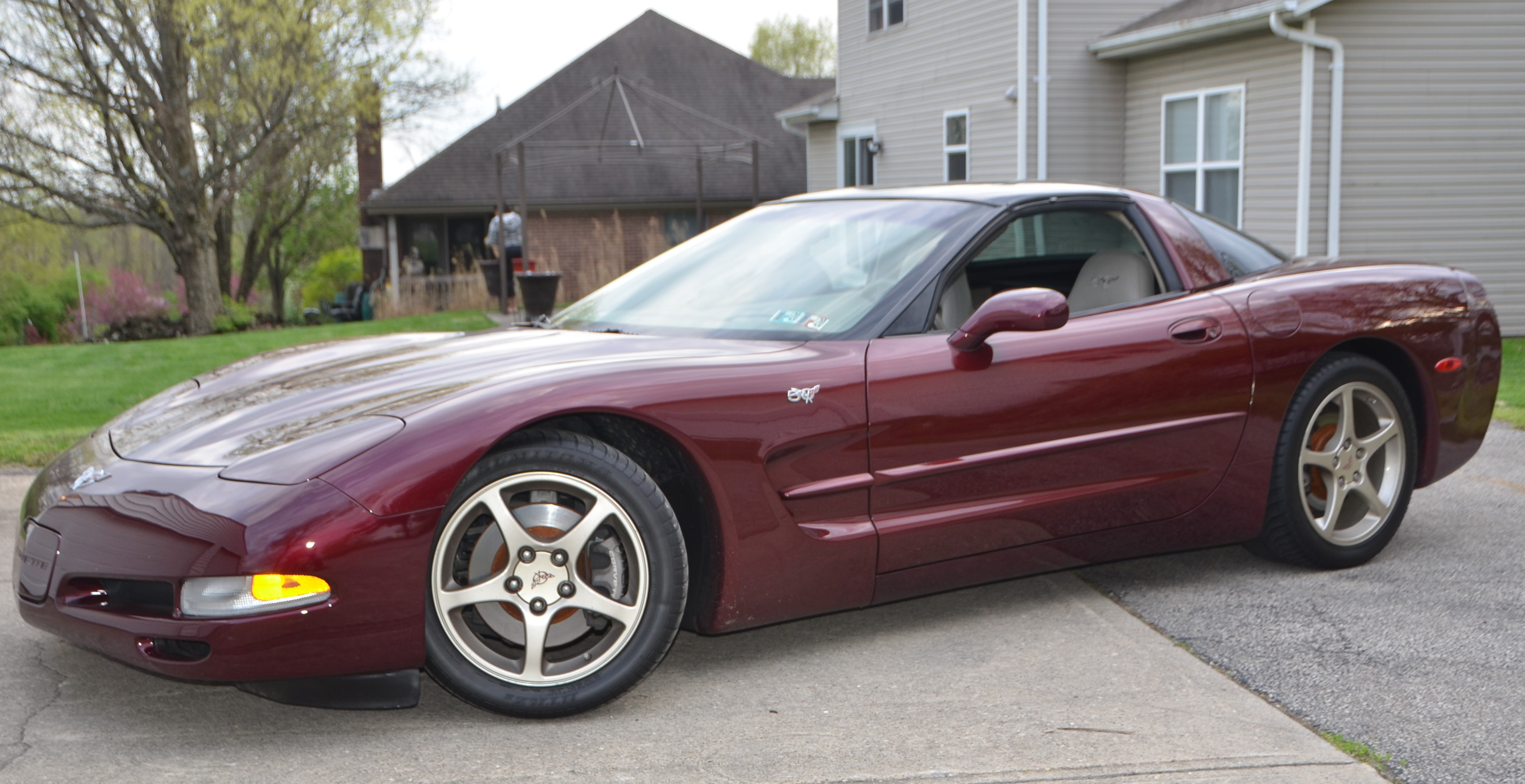
2003 Corvette 50th Anniversary Edition Coupe

A 50th Anniversary Edition (RPO Z25) was offered during the 2003 model year to commemorate a half-century of Corvette production. Available in convertible and coupé models, the 50th Anniversary Edition came with a special shade of red paint ("Anniversary Red Metallic") and shale two-tone leather interior; Anniversary Edition convertibles were adorned with a shale-colored soft top as well. A new option for Corvette in 2003, the F55 Magnetic Selective Ride Control Suspension was standard on the 1SC-equipped Anniversary Edition vehicles. Special ("Warm Nickel Metallic") painted aluminum wheels, embroidered upholstery trim, and badges completed the Anniversary Edition package. Also included were all of the convenience options offered on the upscale Corvette models such as the head-up display.

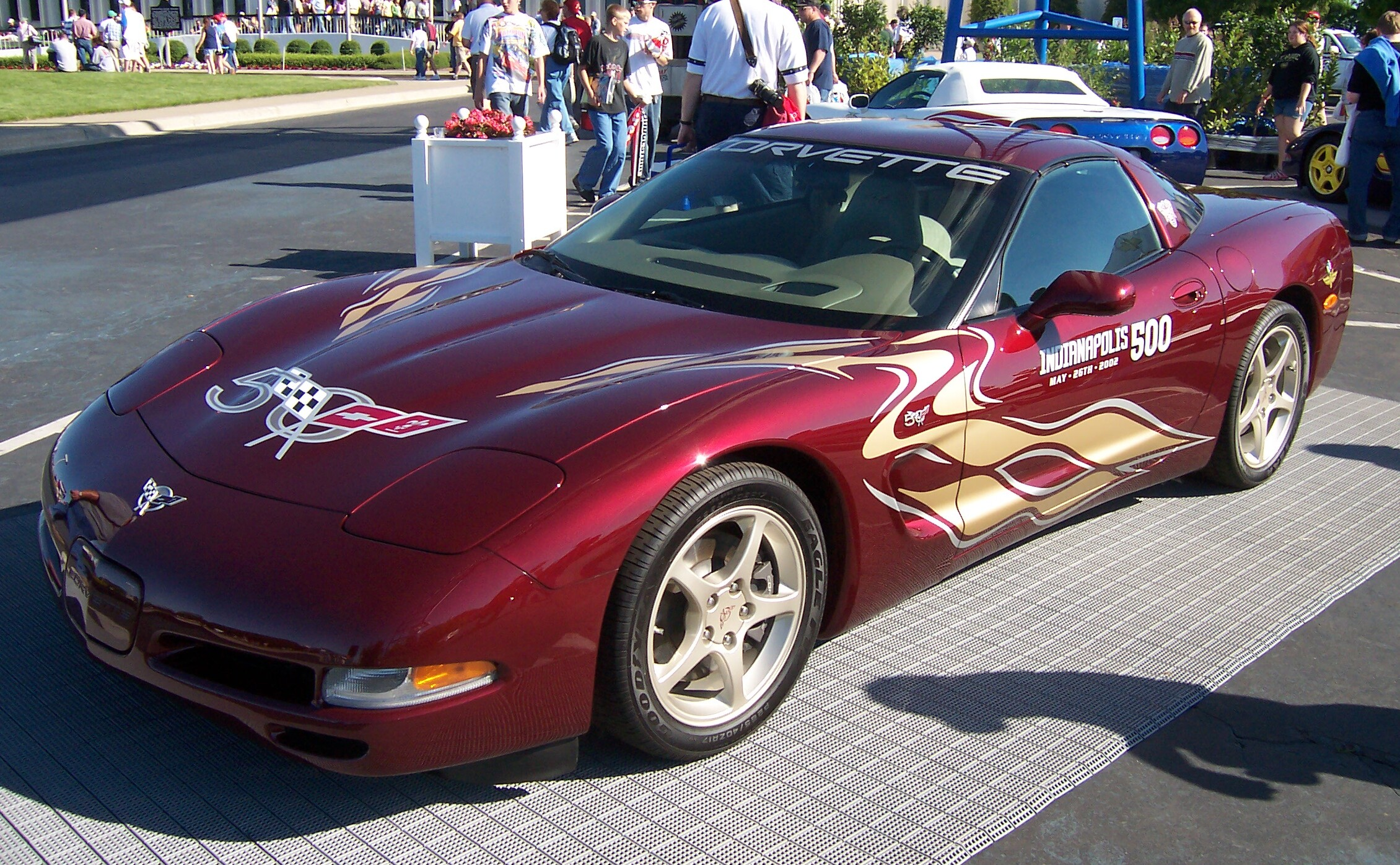
The 50th Anniversary Edition 2002 pace car

A slightly modified 50th Anniversary Edition Corvette was chosen to pace the Indianapolis 500 race in May 2002; then the production vehicle became a centerpiece of the subsequent 50th Anniversary Celebration, sponsored by Chevrolet. Festivities included gatherings in Nashville, Bowling Green, and St. Louis. Thousands of Corvettes and their owners arrived from all over the country to participate in the events marking the vehicle's 50th year of production.

=== Chevrolet Corvette Moray concept (2003) ===
The Corvette Moray is a concept car based on the Corvette coupe and designed by Giorgetto and Fabrizio Giugiaro of Italdesign, commemorating 50 years of the Chevrolet Corvette. It included a 6.0-litre V8 engine, door window half dome, and gull-wing windows hinged at the rear pillar.

The vehicle was unveiled at the 2003 Geneva Motor Show.

=== 24 Hours of Le Mans Commemorative Edition ===
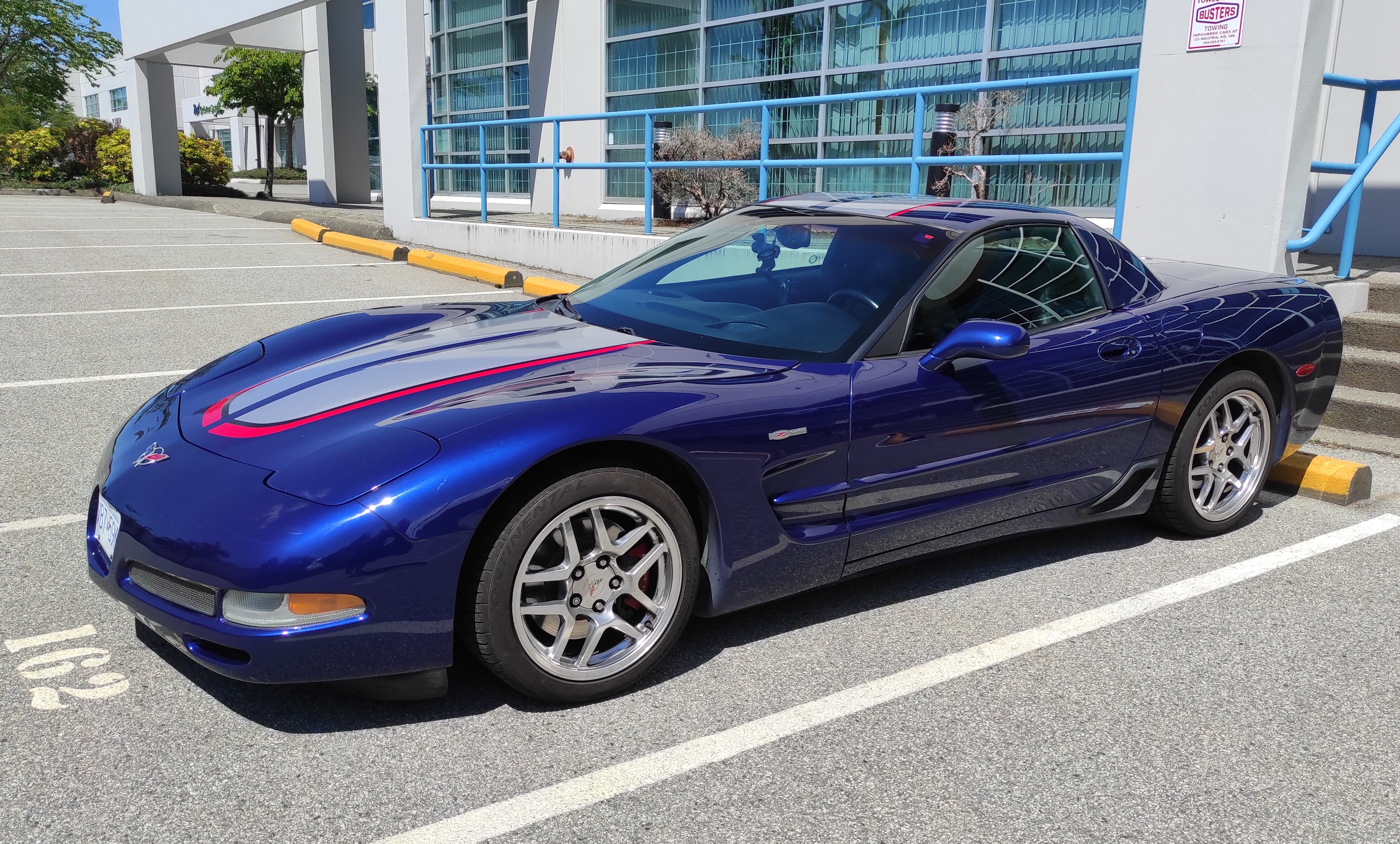
A 2004 Chevrolet Corvette commemorative edition showcasing the chrome wheels, paint and graphics included in the package

During the 2004 model year, a 24 Hours of Le Mans Commemorative Edition package (RPO's Z15 & Z16) were offered as an option for all three C5 models (fastback coupé, convertible, Z06) in celebration of the C5-R "1–2" in-class finishes at Le Mans. The package consisted of a special paint color ("Le Mans Blue Metallic"); shale two-tone leather interior (coupés and convertibles only); and wide, silver-and-red stripes optionally applied down the center of the car (Z06 only). Commemorative Edition convertibles received a shale-colored soft top, and the Z06 version (dubbed the "Z16" after its RPO for the Le Mans Commemorative Edition) received a carbon fiber hood as a further weight-reduction measure. Special commemorative badging, headrest embroidery, and brightly polished wheel (a first on the Z06) with unique center caps completed the package.

There were 2,025 Commemorative Edition (RPO Z16) Z06's built in 2004. The VIN's were sequenced numbers ranging from the first 100013, to the last 132518.

== C5-R ==
The C5-R was a racecar built by Pratt & Miller for GM Racing. It was based on the C5 road car but had a longer wheelbase, wider track, an enlarged 7.0 L V8 and different bodywork with exposed headlamps. It was raced in the American Le Mans Series in the GTS (later GT1) class, the Rolex Sports Car Series in the GTS (later GTO) class, and has been to four 24 Hours of Le Mans races.

- 2001 The car's 2001 racing season produced eight victories in ten races, including an overall win in the 24 Hours of Daytona and a one-two finish in the GTS class at Le Mans.
- 2002 In 2002 the C5-R repeated its one-two victory at Le Mans and also dominated the GTS class in the American Le Mans Series. A new transaxle unit replaced the previous year's separate transmission and differential. Corvette faced stiff competition from the new Prodrive Ferrari 550, which led for most of race but had problems late, leaving the victory to Corvette.
- 2003 In 2003, the Automobile Club de l'Ouest placed additional restrictions on all 24 Hours of Le Mans competitors, reducing power by 10% in an attempt to slow the cars. At the 2003 season-opening 12 Hours of Sebring race, the C5-Rs remained in winning form, with one of them finishing first in class and eighth overall. Also in 2003 the yellow paint was dropped in favor of a special red, white, and blue color scheme to commemorate the Corvette's 50th anniversary. However, at Le Mans the Prodrive Ferraris spoiled the anniversary and hopes for a three-in-a-row victory in the GTS class.
- 2004 Corvette C5-R came back in 2004 and won the 24 Hours of Le Mans in their class. The Prodrive Ferrari led most of the race, but with under 12 hours to go both the Prodrive cars had problems causing them to pit and lose laps. The Corvettes went on to finish 1–2, with the No. 64 car finishing 16 laps ahead of the lead Ferrari.
- 2005 Although in the process of becoming superseded by the C6-R, the Corvette C5-R was not finished with its racing successes. In FIA GT, the new Corvette Europe team won races at Imola and Zhuhai. The Euro team also managed a number of podium finishes. In the ALMS, the Pacific Coast Racing team achieved some podiums behind the factory C6-R.
- 2006 The C5-R returned to Le Mans (France) for the first time as a non-factory entry, run by Le Mans regular Luc Alphand. It finished third in the GT1 class behind the C6-R and Prodrive Aston Martin.
- 2007 Alphand's squad again ran the C5-R at the Le Mans 24 Hour race, in pairing with a C6-R acquired from Corvette Racing.

== Production notes ==
Year	Production	Base Price	Notes
1997	9,752	$37,495	LS1 engine debuts; the fastback coupé is the only bodystyle offered
1998	31,084	$38,995	Convertible C5 debuts with the first trunk in a Corvette convertible since 1962; Indianapolis 500 Pace Car Replica offered; Active Handling System introduced as optional equipment
1999	33,270	$38,777	Less-expensive hardtop coupé is offered as a base-model bodystyle
2000	33,682	$40,900	Newly-styled alloy wheels debut. Four new colors: Millennium Yellow, Magnetic Red ll, Ruby Star Red and Dark Bowling Green.
2001	35,627	$41,475	Hardtop coupé bodystyle becomes top-performance Z06, utilizing the new LS6 engine and suspension improvements; Second-Generation Active Handling System becomes standard equipment on all models; slight (5 hp) increase in base model engine power
2002	35,767	$42,450	20 hp (14.9 kW) increase for the Z06
2003	35,469	$45,895	50th Anniversary Edition package offered for coupe and convertible; F55 Magnetic Selective Ride Control Suspension supersedes F45 Selective Ride Control Suspension as base-model option
2004	34,064	$46,535	24 Hours of Le Mans Commemorative Edition package offered for all models
Total	248,715		

== See also ==
- Chevrolet Corvette
