= Radancy =

American technology company

- Industry: Technology
- Founded: 2006
- Headquarters: New York City
- Key people: Michelle Abbey, President & CEO
- Products: Recruitment software
- Number of employees: 1,136 (2023)

Radancy, formerly known as TMP Worldwide Advertising & Communications, LLC, is an independent technology company that provides SaaS for recruitment and talent acquisition. Headquartered in New York City, the company has 14 offices in the United States, as well as international locations in Brazil, Canada, Germany, France, Austria, the Netherlands, the United Kingdom, India and Singapore.

== History ==
In 1967, Andrew McKelvey founded Telephone Marketing Programs (TMP), a directional marketing company, focused on Yellow Pages advertising.

In 1993, McKelvey partnered with recruitment advertising innovator Don Tendler, formerly of Davis & Dorand, to launch and grow a recruitment division for TMP, which acquired The Monster Board and Online Career Center (OCC) in 1995. TMP Worldwide's career websites grew and eventually merged as Monster.com in 1999.

TMP Worldwide was officially renamed Monster Worldwide in May 2003, with its divisions Monster, TMP Worldwide Advertising & Communications and TMP Worldwide Directional Marketing all keeping their names. The former eResourcing and Executive Search divisions of TMP were also spun off to create Hudson Highland Group. The Yellow Pages directional marketing division was sold in 2005.

On August 31, 2006, Monster Worldwide's advertising and recruitment operations split to form TMP Worldwide Advertising & Communications, LLC in a $45 million management buyout.

In September 2007, TMP acquired UK-based People in Business Limited (PIB), an employer brand consultancy firm.

In September 2012, TMP acquired AIA, an employment and recruitment communications firm based in London. The company further expanded by establishing offices in Germany in 2011 and Brazil in 2014. In 2019, it acquired other companies including of CKR Interactive, Perengo, Carve and Maximum.

On January 26, 2021, TMP rebranded under the name Radancy and encompassed its various offerings under a single united recruitment marketing and metrics platform.

== Recognition ==
Radancy, then TMP Worldwide, won the Silver Specialist Agency of the Year award at the Indian Agency Awards in 2019.
