= McKelvey Foundation =

American charity awarding scholarships

McKelvey Foundation was a charitable organization based in New York City, established in 2000 by Andrew McKelvey, owner of Monster.com. It has awarded college scholarships to more than 600 young students.
