= Yahoo HotJobs =

Online job search engine

- Traded as: Nasdaq: HOTJ
- Genre: Job search engine
- Founded: 1996
- Founder: Richard Johnson
- Defunct: 2011
- Fate: Acquired by Monster, shut down
- Headquarters: New York, New York, U.S.
- Area served: Worldwide
- Key people: Richard Johnson, Dimitri Boylan, Earle Ady, Christopher G. Stach II, Allen Murabayashi
- Services: Job hunting
- Operating income: 138,000,000
- Owner: Yahoo
- Website: hotjobs.com

Yahoo HotJobs, formerly known as hotjobs.com, was an online job search engine. It provided tools and advice for job seekers, employers, and staffing firms. It was acquired by Yahoo in 2002, then acquired by Monster Worldwide, owner of its major competitor Monster.com in 2010—leading to its merger with Monster.com and eventual closure.

== History ==
The company was founded by Richard Johnson and was based at 24 West 40th Street, 12th floor in New York City, across from Bryant Park. Johnson had previously founded the RBL Agency with Ben Carroccio and Liz Johnson (RBL), a boutique employment agency for technologists. The initial website was launched in early 1996 as RBL Agency which evolved into the Online Technical Employment Center (OTEC) in 1999, and only featured technical jobs. Founding employees Christopher G. Stach II, Earle Ady, and Allen Murabayashi designed and coded the first iterations of the site on Silicon Graphics Indy workstations for C application development, Apple Macs for content creation, and the site ran on Sun and SGI hardware.

The company's first advertising effort was as a Yahoo "site of the week", which at the time could be purchased for $1000.

Hotjobs participated in one of Jupiter Communications' first conferences at the New York Sheraton in February 1996.

Thomas Chin joined the organization in October 1996 while attending Columbia University, and eventually became the company's chief scientist.

In the summer of 1997, Johnson decided to expand the operations, and brought Dave Carvajal over from the RBL Agency to build the salesforce and eventually recruit, hire and scale the organization with 8 offices. Dimitri Boylan also move from RBL to head up the sales and marketing effort.

Hotjobs developed a private label job board and applicant tracking system ("ATS") in 1997. Lucent Technologies was the first customer to purchase this product. Later customers for this "ASP" product included UBS, Merrill Lynch, UPS, and several other large companies. The term ASP was later replaced with SaaS, meaning software as a service.

In September 1997, hotjobs shed the technology-only focus by adding job categories for "Finance/Accounting" and "Sales/Marketing." The first hotjobs newsletter followed in October 1997. During this time the name was also officially changed from "HotJobs, Inc." to "HotJobs.com, Ltd" on the suggestion of Peter Connors.

The company startled the advertising world in 1999 when it bought a $1.6 million commercial during Super Bowl XXXIII, considering that its total revenues were approximately $2.5 million. McCann-Erickson Detroit was hired for the production. The company went public in late 1999.

Is spite of the low budget and steep competition from traditional Super Bowl advertisers, the HotJobs commercial was considered a commercial success.

In November 1999, the company hired its first chief marketing officer, Dean Harris, to oversee and manage the consumer image and marketing message.

In 2000, the company moved its headquarters to 406 West 31st Street. The company purchased the leading client-server ATS software company, Resumix, Inc. of Sunnyvale, California in 2000. As part of this effort, the company hired Tim Villanueva, formerly a leading developer at Intuit, as its chief technology officer, and Chuck Price, formerly chief architect at Broadvision, as the company's senior VP of engineering for the Resumix product. Steve Ellis resigned as the CFO and was replaced by Lowell Robinson that same year.

In March 2001, Richard Johnson resigned as chief executive officer and president. The board appointed COO Dimitri Boylan to fill those positions. Boylan quickly set about restructuring the company and expanding the customer base beyond its core market of start-ups and technology companies and deeper into health care, insurance, government, and financial services. Allen Murabayashi, Thomas Chin, and George Nassef left the company in 2001 to pursue new interests. In 2001 the company became profitable and cash flow positive.

In June 2001 George Nassef resigned as EVP engineering and chief information officer to pursue other startup ideas.

For the last six months of 2001, HotJobs was the most-visited career site on the Internet, according to independent research by Media Metrix. In 2001 Hotjobs.com reported total revenue of $117.6 million, exceeding the full year revenue in 2000 of $96.5 million by 21.8%, and ended the year with a balance of cash, cash equivalents and marketable securities of $65.8 million after making $18 million in merger-related expenditures which included Dimitri's payment to Monster of a breakup fee for not completing their merger - opening the door to the Yahoo! offer. HotJobs was ranked #14 in Bloomberg's "Tech 100" list.

Dimitri Boylan took HotJobs.com to the Super Bowl one last time in 2002 with his Parrot/Court Stenographer ad. The ad was well received, with MSU's Department of Advertising faculty experts ranking it 4th in their "Top Ten Touchdowns" list, awarding it 96 out of 111 possible points.

Yahoo purchased the company through an unsolicited bid in 2002, for $436 million, undercutting efforts by Monster Worldwide, owners of Monster.com, to acquire the company. Shortly after the acquisition, Boylan left Yahoo! to pursue new interests.

Monster announced in February 2010, that it would acquire HotJobs from Yahoo for $225 million. As part of the deal, Yahoo! would maintain a three-year profit sharing arrangement with the new owners in exchange for promoting Monster.com on its web properties post-acquisition. After the acquisition, HotJobs began to offer users a chance to migrate their job postings and information to a Monster.com account.

== Concept ==
Yahoo HotJobs' services were free to job seeking users and included posting up to ten versions of a resume. Once signed on, job searches could be saved, allowing ongoing results to be emailed to the user. Job seekers had the ability to pull up statistics that featured the number of times an employer/recruiter reviewed their resume and a complete history of sent cover letters and resumes. Various tools within the site allowed users to calculate ideal salaries, research plans and employee stock options as well as have a "Job Tip of the Day" emailed to them. The Career Tools tab listed other items they offered, like resume building, interviewing advice and an education center. Additionally, using the “HotBlock” feature, applicants could block some or all of HotJobs' companies from viewing their resumes.

Yahoo HotJobs provided employers access to their resume search engine and the ability to post, edit and delete job ads at any time and as often as they liked at no additional cost. Employers were given access to a variety of communication devices, including letter templates and notes, as well as the ability to track their postings.

== Hiring management software ==
Hotjobs developed software solutions, including its Resumix and Softshoe hiring management software.

Resumix's search technology utilized a comprehensive "skills database" called KnowledgeBase (patented) with over 25,000 skills that combined into more than 10 million matching combinations of search terms. The system's built-in intelligence recognized the contextual meaning of words within a resume by extracting relevant information, with a high degree of accuracy. It was a tool to more quickly assess the quality of the candidates. The US government jobs site USAJOBS.gov utilizes this tool.

== Awards ==
Job seekers voted Yahoo Hotjobs the (2002, 2003) "Best General Purpose Job Board for Job Seekers," and recruiters voted Yahoo HotJobs the (2003) "Most Recruiter-Friendly General Purpose Site" in a survey conducted by WEDDLE's.
