= Eons.com =

Former social networking website; domain reused for wellness products

- Company type: Private
- Website type: Social networking service (2006–2012); E-commerce wellness site (2020s–present)
- Available in: English
- Founded: 2006; 20 years ago, in Charlestown, Massachusetts, United States
- Headquarters: Emeryville, California, U.S.
- Area served: Worldwide
- Owners: Crew Media, LLC (former)
- Industry: Internet, Social Networking (former)
- Employees: 10+ (2011)
- Parent: Continuum Crew, LLC (former)
- Website: Eons.com
- Advertising: Banner ads, referral marketing, casual games (former)
- Registration: Required (age restricted) (former)
- Users: 800,000+ (registered users as of September 2011)
- Launched: 2006
- Current status: Defunct as a social network; domain repurposed

Eons.com was a social networking site marketed towards baby boomers and other internet users over age 40. The original service operated from 2006 until its shutdown in 2012.

As of the 2020s, the domain eons.com has been repurposed and is used by an unrelated company selling wellness products, including mushroom-based supplements and beverages.

== History ==
Launched by Monster.com founder Jeff Taylor in July 2006, Eons was backed by venture capital financing from General Catalyst Partners, Sequoia Capital, Charles River Ventures, Intel Capital and Humana, Inc.

In April 2011, it was announced that Crew Media had acquired Eons, and baby boomer online advertising network Eons BOOM Media.

In June 2012, the site shut down following unresolved issues with its service provider. To date, the original social networking platform has not returned.

== Domain reuse ==
After the shutdown of the original service, the eons.com domain was later acquired and repurposed by a separate business. By the early 2020s, it was being used by a wellness and nutritional supplement company focused on products derived from functional mushrooms, including coffee blends and gummy supplements.

The newer company, launched in 2021 according to interviews with its founder, operates independently and is not affiliated with the original Eons social networking service.
