= Variable prepaid forward contract =

A variable prepaid forward contract is an investment strategy that allows a shareholder with a concentrated stock holding to generate liquidity for diversification or other purposes. Additionally, the shareholder will receive cash in hand without paying the capital gains taxes that would apply to a security disposal.

The PVF allows the investor to receive an up-front payment (typically, 75-85% market value) in exchange for delivery of a variable number of shares or cash in the future. Since the contract establishes floor and threshold prices that govern how many shares (or cash equivalent) are returned at a given market price, the investor will be protected against downside risk below the floor while enjoying appreciation potential up to the threshold.

== See also ==
- Tax shelter
