= Chuck's Gun Shop & Range =

Gun store in Riverdale, Illinois

Coordinates: 41.6349°N 87.6176°W

Chuck's Gun Shop & Range was a gun store and indoor firing range in Riverdale, Illinois.

== History ==
The store has been in business since 1984, and is owned by John Riggio. Between 1996 and 2000, Chuck's sold 2,370 guns that were linked to crimes by police, more than any other gun shop in the area. Between 2009 and 2013 guns recovered from crime scenes in the city came from Chuck's more than any other gun dealer – a total of 1,516, 8% of all guns recovered from crimes scenes during that time period. At least three guns sold by the store were involved in fatal shootings of police officers.

The store has been the target of several public protests. Jesse Jackson led protests in 2007, 2012, and 2015. In 2015 activists sued the town of Riverdale for "lax or insufficient methods of administration in licensing and regulating gun dealers" specifically targeting Chuck's in the lawsuit.

The store closed on March 7, 2025
