= Jeff Taylor (entrepreneur) =

American businessman

Jeff Taylor is an American businessman who founded the online jobs site Monster.com.

== Education ==
He is a graduate of the University Without Walls program at the University of Massachusetts Amherst. He had dropped out when he was 17, but went back to get his degree in 1999. He also holds a Certificate-Owner/President Management Program, Executive Education, Harvard Business School; and an honorary doctorate from Bentley College.

== Career ==
In 1994, Jeff Taylor founded The Monster Board, an online jobs site later known as Monster.com. In August 2005, Taylor left Monster to start a new venture.

In 2006, Taylor launched a website called Eons.com, a social networking website for people over age of 50. As founder and CEO of Eons, Inc., he started four sites for baby boomers: Eons.com, Eons Boom Media, Meetcha.com, and Tributes.com. Eons, Inc. was sold to Crew Media in 2011.

In 2020, Taylor became the GM/Chief Customer Officer at Principles, a developer of people management software in Westport, Connecticut.

== Personal life ==
In 2001, Jeff Taylor announced he was selling his home in Holliston, Massachusetts for $1 on the condition that the buyer move the house off the property.

Taylor serves on the board of advisors of the Berklee College of Music. Taylor has been a disc jockey for almost 30 years under the name Jefr Tale and has a weekly show on Sirius/XM Electric Area. In 2011, he started Buffalo.Dj, a talent agency for disc jockeys.
