= Monster Worldwide =

American company

Monster Worldwide, Inc.
- Industry: Employment agency
- Founded: 1967; 59 years ago
- Area served: Worldwide
- Website: corporate.monster.com

Monster Worldwide, Inc., formerly TMP Worldwide, was an American company provider of employment services owned by Zen, JV, LLC. Just recently, Zen, JV, LLC entered into a Chapter 11 bankruptcy procedure where it sold some of its assets, including its job board technology operated by Monster Worldwide, to MCB Bermuda, Ltd, a subsidiary of Bold Holdings LLC.

== History ==
In 1967, Andrew McKelvey founded Telephone Marketing Programs (TMP), a directional marketing company, focused on Yellow Pages advertising. In 1993, McKelvey partnered with recruitment advertising innovator Don Tendler, formerly of Davis & Dorand, to launch and grow a recruitment division for TMP.

In 1995, TMP's recruitment division acquired The Monster Board and Online Career Center (OCC). TMP Worldwide went public in 1996 and its career websites grew and eventually merged as Monster.com in 1999.

Also in 1999, TMP Worldwide acquired LAI Worldwide, formerly Lamalie Associates, to create an executive search division.

=== Monster Worldwide ===
TMP Worldwide was officially renamed Monster Worldwide in May 2003, with its divisions Monster, TMP Worldwide Advertising & Communications and TMP Worldwide Directional Marketing all keeping their names. The former eResourcing and Executive Search divisions of TMP were also spun off to create Hudson Highland Group. The Yellow Pages directional marketing division was sold in 2005.

=== Radancy ===
On August 31, 2006, Monster Worldwide's advertising and recruitment operations split to form TMP Worldwide Advertising & Communications, LLC in a US$45 million management buyout.

=== Option backdating ===
James J. Treacy (1959-2020), who served as president and CEO of Monster, was charged of conspiring with other officers of the company to systematically backdate option grants over a period from 1997 to 2003. He was found guilty by a jury in May 2009 in the United States District Court for the Southern District of New York, and was ultimately sentenced to serve two years in prison.

=== Randstad ===
In August 2016, Monster Worldwide was acquired by Dutch resource services provider Randstad for US$429 million.

=== CareerBuilder ===
On 1 July 2024, Randstad agreed to transfer a controlling interest in Monster Worldwide to CareerBuilder, LLC, represented by the latter's investors, including Apollo Funds. Randstad was to continue to hold a minority stake. The new company structure was to include senior executives from both companies.

== See also ==
- Apollo Global Management
- CareerBuilder
- Monster.com
- Randstad NV
