= Andrew McKelvey =

American businessman (1934–2008)

Andrew McKelvey (October 13, 1934 – November 27, 2008) was an American business mogul and chairman and chief executive of Monster Worldwide. He was a billionaire and a philanthropist through the McKelvey Foundation.

== Personal life ==
McKelvey was born in New York City to Dr. Augustus and Elizabeth (née Gates) McKelvey.

Andrew McKelvey graduated from Westminster College in Pennsylvania. The Westminster College campus center is named in his honor.

== Career ==
After graduating from college, McKelvey operated a movie theater and served in the United States Army. After leaving the Army, he headed to Australia in the mid-1950s, where he hoped he could take advantage of the lag in social trends reaching that part of the world. While there, he began a jukebox business that became one of that country's largest.

He returned to the United States in the early 1960s, and took a job with an ad agency on Madison Avenue, promoting products including Vaseline Hair Tonic. At another agency, Meltzer, Aron & Lemen, he managed an account of a client that advertised in the Yellow Pages, which triggered the idea of pursuing the opportunity of advertising in telephone directories.

In 1967, he founded Telephone Marketing Programs (TMP) as an ad agency focusing on the Yellow Pages ad agency, and built the firm up through a series of acquisitions. The business expanded into help-wanted agencies in the 1990s, which provided his introduction into commerce online. In negotiating to purchase Adion, a help-wanted ad agency run by Jeff Taylor, he learned about the firm's Web site, known as the Monster Board. He purchased Adion in 1995 and eventually bought into the Internet strategy. He further solidified the prominence of Monster.com by acquiring rivals Online Career Center and FlipDog.com. Telephone Marketing Programs (TMP) was later known as TMP Worldwide, and eventually becoming Monster Worldwide. By 2007, the firm had more than 5,000 employees in 36 countries and had revenue of $1.35 billion.

== Philanthropy and Boards ==
As a billionaire philanthropist, McKelvey contributed $25 million to establish the Andrew J. McKelvey Lung Transplant Center at Emory University to support the research of Dr. E. Clinton Lawrence, who had treated him for a lung-scarring ailment. McKelvey helped organize the Families of Freedom fund after the September 11 attacks, headed by Bill Clinton and Bob Dole, which raised more than $100 million to be used toward college scholarships for the children of the attack's victims. He established the McKelvey Foundation in 2000 to fund college scholarships for high school students with an interest in entrepreneurship. He donated $3 million to fund what is now the Andrew J. McKelvey Lower School at New York City's Hewitt School.

McKelvey was a board member of Handgun Control, Inc. and in 2000, founded the Americans for Gun Safety Foundation.

== Controversy ==
McKelvey left Monster Worldwide in 2006 after questions were raised regarding his involvement in the company's backdating of stock options. McKelvey repaid $8 million to the firm and gave up the majority of his voting shares, relinquishing his super-voting B shares and converting them into A shares in order to reduce his voting control in the firm from approximately 31% to 7%. He also made a payment of approximately $276,000 to the Securities and Exchange Commission, which acknowledged that he had not been a beneficiary of the backdated options. Federal authorities had begun the investigation after an article in The Wall Street Journal raised questions about what the paper called "a series of improbably well-timed stock-option grants to senior executives".

== Death ==
McKelvey died in New York City at age 74 on November 27, 2008, of pancreatic cancer.

McKelvey's estate was party to the case Estate of McKelvey v. Commissioner over the taxation of variable prepaid forward contracts which he had signed shortly before his death.
