= Monster.com =

Puerto Rican employment website

Monster Worldwide, Inc.
- Website type: Employment website
- Available in: Multilingual
- Founded: January 1999; 27 years ago
- Headquarters: Guaynabo, Puerto Rico, PR
- Owner: BOLD www.bold.com
- Founder: Jeff Taylor
- Key people: Doug Jackson (co-CEO), Jamie Freundlich (co-CEO)
- Industry: Human resources
- Website: www.monster.com
- Commercial: Yes
- Registration: Required
- Current status: Active

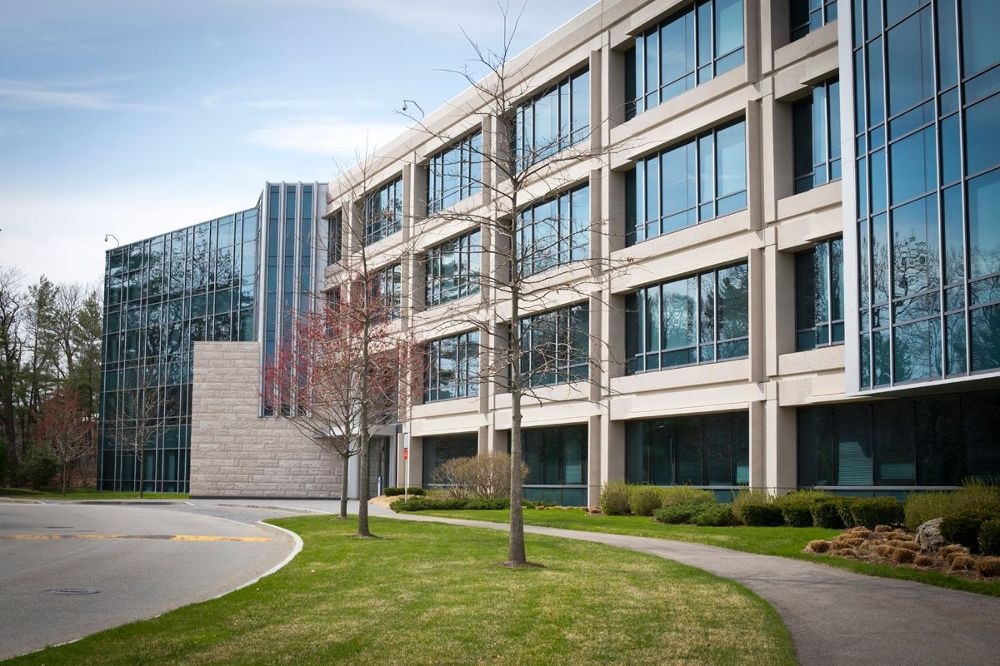
Monster.com's headquarters in Weston, Massachusetts

Monster.com is a global employment website and job search engine headquartered in Guaynabo, Puerto Rico. Along with its sister site, CareerBuilder, it is owned by BOLD Holdings.

== History ==
In the early 1990s, Jeff Taylor, the owner of human resources company Adion, contracted Net Daemons Associates to develop a facility whereby job seekers could search a job database with a web browser. The site went live in April 1994 as Monsterboard.com. It was populated with job descriptions from the newspaper segment of Adion's business.

It was one of the first employment websites.

Shortly thereafter, it was acquired by TMP Worldwide, led by Andrew McKelvey, for $930,000. TMP also acquired Online Career Center and, in 1999, merged it with Monster Board to form Monster.com.

In October 2000, Monster launched Monstermoving.com to provide resources to assist users with a successful move.

In April 2002, Monster purchased the Jobs.com domain name and trademark for $800,000.

In 2003, TMP completed the corporate spin-off of Monster.

In August 2005, founder Jeff Taylor left Monster to create Eons.com.

In 2006, the general counsel of the company was fired in connection with an options backdating scandal, and he was also investigated by the U.S. Securities and Exchange Commission. Andrew McKelvey refused to be interviewed as part of an internal investigation and resigned from the board of directors. James J. Treacy (1959–2020), who served as president and CEO of Monster, was found guilty by a jury in May 2009 and was sentenced to two years in prison. The options backdating scandal also required the company to restate earnings since 2001. In April 2007, Sal Iannuzzi was named chairman and CEO, replacing William M. Pastore, who resigned as part of the scandal.

In January 2008, Monster acquired Affinity Labs for $61 million.

In July 2008, it acquired Trovix, a semantic job search engine, for $72.5 million.

In February 2010, Monster acquired Yahoo HotJobs for $225 million and then integrated it into the Monster.com website.

In 2011, Monster launched mobile apps.

In the first quarter of 2014, Monster relocated its headquarters from Maynard, Massachusetts to Weston Corporate Center in Weston, Massachusetts.

In February 2014, Monster acquired TalentBin, a talent search engine, and Gozaik, a developer of social jobs aggregation and distribution technology.

In November 2014, Iannuzzi resigned under pressure after focusing on profits but failing to produce any.

In June 2016, Monster.com acquired Jobr, a job search mobile app, for $12.5 million.

In August 2016, Monster was acquired by Randstad NV, a multinational human resources and recruitment specialist, for $429 million in cash.

In January 2018, Quess acquired Monster's business in India, SE Asia and the Middle East. In November 2022, the name of this business was changed to Foundit, and the website became a talent management platform in the Asia-Pacific and the Middle East regions.

In September 2024, Monster merged with CareerBuilder, and funds managed by Apollo Global Management became the majority owner of the websites.

On June 24, 2025, CareerBuilder + Monster filed for Chapter 11 bankruptcy protection in an effort to facilitate a sale of its job board operations to JobGet. The company's software services business for federal and state governments are to be sold to Canadian software company Valsoft, while military.com and fastweb.com are to be sold to Canadian media company Valnet. The company listed assets between $50 million and $100 million, and liabilities between $100 million and $500 million.

However, in July/August 2025, BOLD won the final bid of $28.4 million.

In 2026, Monster launched a free resume builder and resume templates.

== Sponsorships ==
Monster's first Super Bowl ad, "When I Grow Up" (created by Mullen for the 1999 Super Bowl), asked job seekers, "What did you want to be?" It was the only commercial named on the "Best of Television 1999" list by Time.

Monster was the official online career management services sponsor of the 2002 Winter Olympics and the 2002 U.S. Olympic Team.

== Data breaches ==
In less than two weeks in August 2007, Monster had numerous leaks that resulted in the loss of millions of customers' data to identity theft. Monster waited several days to announce this leak, a delay that drew heavy criticism.

In January 2009, there was another large-scale leak at its UK-based site monster.co.uk, in which demographic information of up to 4.5 million people was obtained by hackers.

In 2019, the company revealed a data breach resulting in résumés from May 2017 being shared online.

== See also ==
- List of employment websites
