= List of employment websites =

This is a list of notable employment websites. An employment website is a web site dealing specifically with employment or careers.

Site	Location	Type of employment	Notes
Adzuna	U.K.	General	Content aggregator
AfterCollege	U.S.	College graduates	
AlJazeera Jobs	Middle East	General	Based in Bahrain (Jobs at Al Jazeera)
AngelList	U.S.	Startups	
Canadian Job Bank	Canada	General	Government affiliated, connected to Working in Canada
CareerArc Social Recruiting	U.S.	General	
CareerBuilder + Monster.com	U.S. and international	General	Merged in 2024
CareerStructure.com	U.K. and international	Construction industry	
Craigslist	U.S. and international	General classified ads	
CV-Library	U.K.	General	
Dice.com	U.S.	Engineering and I.T.	
Freelancer.com	Australia, London, Manila, Jakarta, U.S.	General	Based in Sydney, Australia
Glassdoor	U.S. and International	General	Includes anonymous employer reviews and salaries. Acquired by Recruit
Gumtree	U.K., Australia, and international	General classified ads	
Guru.com	U.S.	Freelance	
HackerRank	India and international	General	
IAESTE	International	Students in technical fields	Non-profit, based in Luxembourg
Indeed.com	U.S. and international	General	Acquired by Recruit
Insidetrak	Australia	General	Content aggregator. Part of Glassdoor.com
Internshala	India	Students, recent graduates, internships	
Jobindex	Denmark	General	Content aggregator
JobServe	U.S. and U.K.	General	
JobStreet	Southeast Asia	General	Based in Malaysia
JobTiger	Bulgaria	General	
Kalibrr	Philippines and Indonesia	General	
Kijiji	Canada and international	General classified ads	Part of eBay
LinkedIn	U.S. and international	Professional networking	Acquired by Microsoft on December 8, 2016
Naukri.com	India	General	
Oodle, Inc.	U.S.	General classified ads	Content aggregator
PageGroup	U.K.	Administration	FTSE company
PeoplePerHour	U.K.	Freelance	
Proven	U.S.	Small and Medium Sized Businesses	Hiring tools for employers
Reed.co.uk	U.K.	General	Employment agency
Rozee.pk	Pakistan	General	
SEEK	Australia	General	
SimplyHired	U.S. & International	General	Content aggregator. Acquired by Recruit
Snagajob	U.S.	Hourly jobs	Rebranded as "Snag" in 2018, then reverted to "Snagajob" in 2019
Swissnex	Switzerland	Science and technology	Professional networking resources, government affiliated
TheLadders.com	U.S.	High-salary	
The Muse	U.S.	General	
TimesJobs	India and the Middle East	General	Several industry-specific sites
Trovit	Europe and Latin America	General classified ads	Based in Spain
Universal Jobmatch	U.K.	General	Government affiliated, connected with Monster.com
Upwork	International	Freelance	Contract and freelance roles, not employment
USAJobs	U.S.	Federal civil service jobs	Government affiliated
WayUp	U.S.	General	
Working in Canada	Canada	General	Government affiliated, connected to Canadian Job Bank
Workopolis	Canada	General	Acquired by Recruit
XING	Germany	General	
Y Combinator	U.S.	Startups	
ZipRecruiter	U.S.	General	

== See also ==
- .jobs, a sponsored top-level domain for employment-related sites.
- Job hunting
