= National Incubation Center =

Public-private technology start-up program, Pakistan

- Type: Startup incubation program
- Industry: Seed accelerator, Business incubator
- Founded: July 19, 2016; 10 years ago
- Headquarters: Islamabad Capital Territory, Pakistan
- Number of locations: Islamabad; Lahore; Peshawar; Karachi; Quetta; Hyderabad; Faisalabad
- Website: nicpakistan.pk niclahore.lums.edu.pk nicpeshawar.pk nickarachi.com nicquetta.com nichyderabad.com nicf.pk

National Incubation Center (or NIC), is a Pakistan-based startup incubation program under a public-private partnership with the Ministry of Information Technology and Telecommunication (MoTT), and other entities in Pakistan including the Ignite National Technology Fund.

The Ignite National Technology Fund has established seven regional NICs. all across Pakistan as the resultant of the strategic infrastructure development component of MoTT's Digital Pakistan Policy. These NIC's Were created to give youth the proper training and facilities to start their own startups and businesses all across Pakistan.

== Notable Founders ==
- Monis Rehman CEO Rozee - Cohort 04, NIC Lahore
- Asif Peer CEO Systems Limited - NIC Lahore
