= RGF Staffing =

Dutch business services company

RGF Staffing B.V.
- Type: Naamloze vennootschap
- Industry: Recruitment
- Predecessor: USG People N.V.
- Founded: 1997
- Headquarters: Almere, Netherlands
- Key people: Rob Zandbergen (CEO), Cees Veerman (Chairman of the supervisory board)
- Products: Employment agencies, human resources services
- Revenue: €3.099 billion (2010)
- Operating income: €43.1 million (2010)
- Net income: €15.3 million (2010)
- Total assets: €1.677 billion (end 2010)
- Total equity: €740.8 million (end 2010)
- Number of employees: 7,160 (average, 2010)
- Website: www.rgfstaffing.com

RGF Staffing B.V. (Formerly known as USG People N.V.) is a Dutch-based recruitment and human resources company, headquartered in Almere. Recruit Global Staffing is Holland's second-largest employment company behind Randstad NV.

== Overview ==
The firm has a presence in thirteen countries in Central and Western Europe, operating temporary employment agencies and providing secondment and other HR services. Predecessor USG People was formed by the 1997 merger of the companies Unique International and Goudsmit and was known as United Services Group between 2001 and 2005. The company was listed on Euronext Amsterdam as well as a constituent of the mid-cap AMX stock market index. In 2016 the Recruit Holdings (based in Japan) acquired all shares of USG People for 1.42 billion euros.

== History ==
The company in its current form was founded from the 1997 merger between the Benelux staffing firm Unique International B.V. and the publicly traded Goudsmit N.V., a holding company involved in various sectors including recruitment. The enlarged group changed its name to United Services Group N.V. in 2001.

In 2002 United Services Group acquired a controlling stake in the job agency Start Holding, which had been privatised by the Dutch government six years earlier. This was later expanded to full control. The deal gave USG an increased presence in countries such as Spain and Italy.

The company acquired smaller Belgian peer Solvus Resource Group for around €585 million in August 2005, after which it again changed its name to USG People N.V.

In late 2008 the company adopted a "poison pill" defence against potential acquisitors by issuing preference shares to a company foundation.

== Operations ==
The company operates around 1,350 branches across 10 European countries. The Dutch market remains the largest for the company, contributing nearly 40% of all revenues. Belgium and Luxembourg, France, Germany and Spain are the next largest regional divisions of the firm.

By far the company's largest business segment is general temporary work agencies, which operate under the unified Start People brand across all countries. USG also owns several specialist staffing agencies, recruiting into professions such as administration, finance, secretarial work and health care. Its professional division covers the recruitment and secondment of staff in skilled fields including engineering, telecommunications and IT, while the company also provides various other services in the field of customer services.

== See also ==
- Luba Group
