= The Muse (website) =

Online career platform

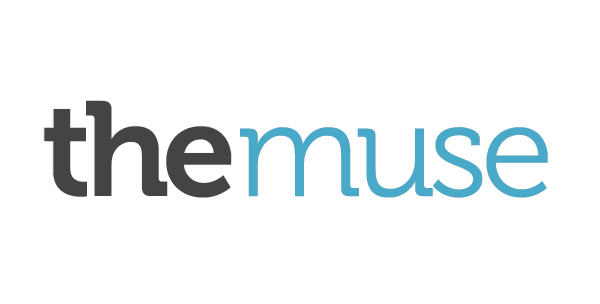
- Website type: Employment website
- Available in: English
- Founded: September 2011 (15 years ago)
- Headquarters: New York City, New York, {{{location_country}}}
- Founders: Kathryn Minshew; Alexandra Cavoulacos; Melissa McCreery
- Key people: Kathryn Minshew (CEO); Alexandra Cavoulacos (President)
- Website: themuse.com
- Launched: September 6, 2011 (15 years ago)
- Current status: Active

The Muse (formerly known as The Daily Muse) is a New York City-based online career platform founded in 2011 by Kathryn Minshew, Alexandra Cavoulacos, and Melissa McCreery.

== History ==
The site was conceived after getting feedback from readers of The Daily Muse, the company's career-focused online publication, that indicated readers found the job searching frustrating and "would go through multiple rounds of interviews before realizing the company wasn't a great fit". Furthermore, users said the #1 annoyance for them in the job search was never hearing back from an employer after they'd applied. Based on this realization, the 3 founders decided to create a different kind of job site. The site was launched under the name Company Muse in February 2012, and is now known simply as The Muse.

The Muse originally launched in Brooklyn as The Daily Muse on September 6, 2011, with eight editors and eleven columnists. The first version of the site grew from 20,000 users to 70,000 users in its first 3 months.

In 2012, Minshew, Cavoulacos, and McCreery applied to Y Combinator at the recommendation of their advisor Rachel Sklar. They traveled to San Francisco for the interview and were accepted into the program that same day. The founders moved to Silicon Valley for 8 months during Y Combinator and the subsequent fundraiser, after which they decided to locate their headquarters in New York City starting in September 2012. "The diversity of the N.Y.C. tech and startup scene won us over" said in an interview by bizjournals.com.

Including initial funding from Y Combinator, 500 Startups, and others, The Muse received $1.2 million in seed funding in January 2013 to continue growing the business.

After re-branding to The Muse in June 2013, the company was a finalist in The Wall Street Journal Startup of the Year competition in Fall 2013. Tyra Banks and others invested $1 million in The Muse in February 2014. In May 2015, The Muse announced a $10 million Series A round led by Theresia Gouw at Aspect Ventures, with participation by DBL Partners and QED Ventures. In June 2016, the company raised $16 million in a Series B funding round led by Icon Ventures, with current investors Aspect Ventures, DBL Partners, and QED Investors participating.

== Services ==
The Muse creates in-depth profiles of companies seeking top talent, showcasing their brand through behind-the-scenes videos of the office and team culture, interviews with employees, and current job openings. In a 2012 interview with Fast Company, founder Kathryn Minshew explained how the team creates “all the content” by sending someone into the office to capture everything needed to build a profile. The idea is to establish authentic and lasting connections between companies and candidates before the formal application process begins.

In November 2016, The Muse launched "Coach Connect", a network of expert career coaches available to users seeking professional guidance in their job search. The service offers resume review and editing, career Q&As, personalized job search or networking plans, and specialized coaching in interviewing, negotiation, and leadership.

The Muse was a finalist in The Wall Street Journal "Startup of the Year" competition in Fall 2013.

Kathryn Minshew, Alex Cavoulacos, and Melissa McCreery were number 59 on Business Insider’s 2012 Silicon Alley 100. Minshew and Cavoulacos made the list again as number 85 in 2015.

Fast Company included The Muse in their Top 50 Enterprise, 2018 World's Most Innovative Company list, saying "businesses that hire through The Muse retain 95% of those employees for at least three months."

In October 2018, co-founder Kathryn Minshew was listed in Inc. (magazine)'s Female Founders 100 List.

== Acquisitions ==
In June 2017 The Muse announced its acquisition of Chicago-based company, Brand Amper and rebranded it as Brand Builder. This deal represented the first tech acquisition for The Muse. In November 2018 they acquired San Francisco-based HR tech company TalentShare.

== See also ==
- List of employment websites
