= Inside track =

The inside track, in racing sports, is the lane closest to the interior (and therefore the shortest). Metaphorically, it can refer to any form of advantage. It may also refer to:

- Inside Track, a British property educational company that started in 2001 and operated in the UK, and Hong Kong until 2008
- Insidetrak, a website offering job listing and employer reviews (AU based)
- The Inside Track, a Canadian radio program
- "Inside Track" (Suits), a 2011 television episode
