= Experteer =

German online career and recruitment marketplace

Experteer GmbH
- Type of business: Public
- Available in: English, German, Dutch, French, Italian, Spanish
- Founded: 2005
- Headquarters: Munich, Germany
- Founder: Christian Göttsch (Founder & CEO)
- Key people: Klaus Mantel (Managing Director); Thomas Kindler (VP Product); Thomas Nitsche (Director of Engineering); Alexander Chukovski (Director Job Advertising Business)
- Industry: Internet
- Services: Online Employment; Employment Search Service
- Employees: 150
- URL: www.experteer.de
- Commercial: Yes
- Registration: Required
- Current status: Active

Experteer is an online career and recruitment marketplace. Founded in 2005, the company is headquartered in Munich. Experteer offers job postings for executive positions in Europe and the US. Christian Göttsch is the CEO of Experteer.

== History ==
Experteer was founded in 2005 with support from investors, including Holtzbrinck Ventures, eVentures and Wellington Partners and it launched its service in 2006. In 2010, Experteer began offering Business-to-Business services for headhunters and recruiters. In 2012, Experteer launched their first mobile app for iPhone, and in 2015, an Android version.

== International markets ==
Experteer's first international expansion was in the UK and PAN Europe, in 2007. Individual country versions for France, Switzerland, Italy and Austria were launched in 2008. Further expansion in the Netherlands, Spain and US took place in 2009.

== See also ==
- Employment website
