= Round Table (disambiguation) =

The Round Table is the legendary gathering place of King Arthur's knights in the Arthurian legend.

Round Table or roundtable may also refer to:

- Round table (discussion), an assembly for discussion of a particular topic among participants, especially at an academic conference
- Round table (furniture), a circular table with no straight-edged side

== Organisations ==
- Round Table (club), an international social networking and charitable fundraising group for men in their 20s, 30s and early 40s
- Agri-Energy Roundtable, a non-governmental organization accredited by the United Nations
- The European Round Table of Industrialists, an influential European interest group
- The Round Table movement, an association founded in 1909 to promote the unity of the British Empire and later the Commonwealth of Nations

== Famous gatherings around round tables ==
- Treaty of Karlowitz, signed on 26 January 1699 in Sremski Karlovci (Serbia), where the "Round Table" was used for the first time in the history of the international diplomatic negotiations.
- Algonquin Round Table, a New York City gathering of wits in the 1920s
- Dutch–Indonesian Round Table Conference, held in the Hague from August 23 to November 2, 1949 and ended with Dutch recognition of Indonesian sovereignty
- Belgo-Congolese Round Table Conference, held in Brussels January 20 – February 20 and April 26 – May 16 and ended with an agreement on Congolese sovereignty
- East German Round Table, December 7, 1989 to March 1990, instituted during the collapse of the East German SED state to institutionalize citizen participation in governmental decisions during the transition until parliamentary elections could be held
- Polish Round Table Agreement, in Warsaw, Poland, February 6 – April 4, 1989
- Round Table Conferences (India), organized between 1930 and 1932 by the British government

== Art, entertainment, and media ==
- The Round Table (book), a collection of essays by William Hazlitt and Leigh Hunt published in 1817
- Round Table (magazine), an American literary weekly magazine
- Round Table (band), a Japanese pop ("J-Pop") band
- The Round Table (TV series), an American television series
- The Roundtable, a Turkish television series for TRT World
- The Round Table (journal), a policy matters journal relating to the Commonwealth of Nations, originally the journal of the Round Table movement
- "Table Ronde", a song about the Congolese Round Table Conference

== Brands and enterprises ==
- Round Table Advertising, a Canadian advertising agency based in Toronto, Ontario
- Round Table Pizza, a chain of pizza restaurants located mostly in the western United States

== Other uses ==
- Round Table (horse), a champion thoroughbred racehorse
- Round Table (tournament), a type of medieval chivalric tournament
- King Arthur's Round Table, a Neolithic monument in the United Kingdom
- Microsoft RoundTable, a 360-degree videoconferencing device
