= Proven (company) =

Proven, Inc.
- Type: Private company
- Industry: Small Business Industries Hiring
- Founded: 2009
- Headquarters: Austin, Texas,
- Key people: Pablo Fuentes, CEO & Cofounder Sean Falconer, Cofounder Joe Mellin, Cofounder
- Website: www.Proven.com

Proven was a hiring tool and content hub for small businesses across the United States. Proven's software allowed managers to post their jobs to over 100 job sites including Simply Hired, Craigslist, Indeed, and Proven. Proven also offered tools that allow users to sort, evaluate, message and onboard applicants. Job seekers could apply directly to jobs on the Proven mobile apps, through the Proven website or through any of Proven's job board partners. Proven was based in San Francisco, California and Austin, Texas and was used by over 1,000 small businesses throughout the United States.

== History ==
Proven was co-founded by Pablo Fuentes, Sean Falconer, and Joe Mellin in 2009. The company was privately held with seed investment from Andreessen Horowitz, Greylock Partners, Kapor Capital, 500 Startups, Founder Collective, Morado Ventures, and other angels.

In August 2012, Proven launched its free Proven Job Search app for iOS. In December 2012, Proven Job Search for Android was launched. Proven Job Search allows users to search and apply to jobs directly from their iOS or Android device. Users can also import their resume, or create one directly within the app.

In 2013, Proven pivoted to become a hiring tool and job board specifically for the restaurant and hospitality industries. The Proven app remains active as a tool for applicants to apply to jobs. In early 2015, Proven also rolled out an onboarding feature which stores documents and allows applicants to sign them electronically. In the fall of 2015, Proven expanded its hiring tool and job board for small businesses in all industries nationwide.

In August 2019, Proven announced that it was acquired by Upward.net, a job site headquartered in Newark, California.

== See also ==
- Applicant Tracking System
