= Rozee =

Rozee is a surname. Notable people with the surname include:

- Connor Rozee (born 2000), Australian rules footballer
- Katharina Rozee (1632–1682), Dutch artist

== See also ==
- Rozee.pk, website
