= Hinterland Who's Who =

Canadian series of wildlife public service announcements

Hinterland Who's Who is a Canadian series of 60-second public service announcements profiling Canadian animals, produced by Environment Canada Wildlife Service and the National Film Board of Canada (NFB) in the 1960s and 70s, and re-launched by the Canadian Wildlife Federation in the 2000s.

== Format ==
The Hinterland Who's Who series was commissioned in 1962 by the Canadian Wildlife Service, as a way to generate interest in Canada's wildlife through a series of short, one-minute vignettes, broadcast during commercial breaks. The series, produced for the CWS by the National Film Board, has been airing on Canadian television since 1963.

In the original announcements, a distinctive refrain of flute music (John Cacavas' Flute Poem) opens the ad, and is accompanied by the low-key style of the narrator, John Livingston (originally the executive director of the Canadian Audubon Society), describing the animal over footage of it taken in the wild.

The end of each message, where viewers were reminded to contact the Canadian Wildlife Service for additional information, varied. The earliest installments from 1963 concluded with, "For a more complete story on the [animal], why not contact the Canadian Wildlife Service in Ottawa?" After the series was introduced in colour, it concluded with, "For more information on the [animal], contact the Canadian Wildlife Service, in Ottawa." Newer segments in the late-1970s and 1980s ended with, "For more information on the [animal], why not contact the Canadian Wildlife Service in Ottawa?", with later instalments including its postal code, K1A 0H3. Viewers requesting information received a four-page, illustrated brochure providing more details on the featured animal.

By the early-1990s, the series received about $3.6 million in free publicity, and over a million leaflets were sent out to inquiring viewers.

A French version of this series was also produced, as Merveilles de la faune (Wonders of Wildlife) or Faune et flore du pays (The country's fauna and flora).

In 2003, the Canadian Wildlife Federation, in cooperation with the Government of Canada, began producing new episodes of Hinterland Who's Who, featuring two versions:

- those containing the quiet narrative of the original series of commercials
- those containing modern background music, directed at younger viewers

These versions, now available as 30- or 60-second installments, are often hosted on-camera and voiced by a female Canadian Wildlife Service worker (Jody Gienow), concluding with, "To learn more about [subject], and how you can protect it, visit "hww.ca". The initial animals featured in the new series included the polar bear, the monarch butterfly, the leatherback sea turtle, and the loon.

In both cases, the new Hinterland Who's Who narrative includes suggestions for conservation along with the description of the animal and its behavior.

== Presumed lost installments ==
In July 2013, it was announced that the first four installments of Hinterland Who's Who, released in the Summer of 1963, were presumed lost, as the Canadian Wildlife Federation and the Canadian Wildlife Service were unable to locate any copies for the series' 50th anniversary, despite extensive searches of various sources, including the NFB, Library and Archives Canada, the CBC archives, and even YouTube. These segments, filmed in black and white with versions in English and French, featured the beaver, the loon, the gannet and the moose.

Soon after the problem of the search was made public, one of the missing installments, an English-language version featuring the loon, was found in the CBC Vancouver archives a few days later, as part of a commercial break during a broadcast of the 1932 Laurel and Hardy classic comedy, Helpmates on July 1, 1969, a holiday then known as Dominion Day. According to Colin Preston, library coordinator at the CBC Vancouver Media Archives, the 1969 recordings were saved by a former CBC employee, who later donated them to the archives for posterity. The footage for the 1963 loon installment was originally filmed in colour, but converted to black and white for the installment. The colour film and soundtrack would be recycled in later versions of the series. Another of the missing four, the original beaver vignette, was subsequently found by Preston as well, as were the moose, and the gannet. The French-language versions of all four animals soon followed.

== Re-airings ==
Starting in August 2016, the local Mountain View, California television show John Wants Answers started airing the original Hinterland Who's Who vignettes in high definition. The show obtained digital high definition copies converted from the original film from the NFB.

== In popular culture ==
These announcements became a widely recognized and often-parodied feature of Canadian pop culture.

- SCTV episode 142 featured a spoof of the Hinterland Who's Who "Woodchuck" episode, voiced by John Candy. The woodchuck also makes a brief appearance in episode 143.
- Also on SCTV, Bob and Doug McKenzie parodied the Hinterland's distinctive flute theme by singing "coo roo coo coo, coo coo coo coo" at the start of each Great White North sketch.
- A spoof Hinterland Who's Who episode entitled "The Wood Spider" credited to "First Church of Christ, Filmmaker" was released on YouTube in 2006 and has garnered nearly 62 million views as of August 2024. The video purported to show the behavior of wood spiders given various drugs, such as alcohol, caffeine, and THC, a mocking reference to the 1940s research of Peter N. Witt, who showed that giving drugs to spiders alters their web building behavior.
- The Double Exposure comedy series on CBC Radio repeatedly sent up the series with a number of 'Political Hinterland Who's Who' sequences in the late 1980s and 1990s. With no visuals, the narrator's elaborate punning compared bureaucratic affairs to the struggle for survival in nature. "On the depression north of Lake Ontario, the Great Blue Harris, or in Latin, Attila Foraqueensparkicus, has stirred up a hornets' nest with its fellow creatures living off a diet of bologna and tuna. The Great Blue Harris, not concerned with the welfare of others, has stirred the left wing back into full flight."
- The PSA "House Hippo" by Concerned Children's Advertisers was a parody of the series. It features a voice over and footage of a small hippo. The narration was similar in style to "Hinterland Who's Who".
- The game Dragon Age: Inquisition, produced by Canadian video game developer BioWare, features a sub-quest named "Hinterland Who's Who".

== See also ==
- Heritage Minutes, sixty-second short films, each illustrating an important moment in Canadian history
