= Luba =

Luba may refer to:

== Geography ==
- Kingdom of Luba, a pre-colonial Central African empire
- Ľubá, a village and municipality in the Nitra region of south-west Slovakia
- Luba, Abra, a municipality in the Philippines
- Luba, Equatorial Guinea, a town on the island of Bioko

== People ==
- Luba (given name), a Slavic feminine given name
  - Luba (singer) (born 1958), Canadian music artist of Ukrainian descent
    - Luba (EP), a 1982 extended play album by Canadian singer Luba
- Luba people, an ethnic group in Central Africa, mostly in the Democratic Republic of the Congo

== Other ==
- Luba (comics), a comic book character created by Los Bros Hernandez
- Luba Group, a Dutch staffing company
- Luba-Kasai language (a.k.a. Tshiluba)
- Missa Luba, a musical setting of the Latin Mass made by Luba people and recorded in 1958 by Les Troubadours du Roi Bauduoin
- BAW Luba, a full-size sport utility vehicle
