= Kevin Chan (Meta executive) =

Kevin Chan MSM, FRCGS
- Title: Senior Director, Policy Campaigns at Meta; Chairman of MediaSmarts

Kevin Chan is a Canadian public policy and tech executive who serves as Senior Director, Policy Campaigns at Meta.

== Education and early career ==
Chan graduated from Harvard University's John F. Kennedy School of Government and the Ivey Business School.

In 2008, while serving as Director in the Office of the Clerk of the Privy Council, he left the Public Service of Canada to serve as Director of Policy in the Office of the Leader of the Opposition. His transition occurred during the 2008-2009 Canadian Parliamentary Dispute which made it the subject of national media coverage

In 2014, while serving as Deputy Secretary-General at McGill University, Chan co-led the university's successful negotiations with Copibec to reduce its licensing fees.

== Career at Meta ==
Chan's work at Meta is the subject of a lengthy profile in The Logic, noting that "Chan has led a purge of Canadian conspiracy theorists from Facebook, negotiated deals to fund many of the country's news media publishers, been nominated to various university public-policy advisory boards, and spearheaded weighty public discussions about misinformation, election integrity and the future of the internet...."

In 2023, UNESCO named his initiative translating the Facebook platform into Inuktitut an example of "digital empowerment driving the International Decade of Indigenous Languages". He is also co-author of the AI paper Omnilingual ASR: Open-Source Multilingual Speech Recognition for 1600+ Languages that creates a new open-source framework for transcription, including low-resource Indigenous languages.

== Non-profit governance ==
In 2024, he was elected the Chair of the Board of MediaSmarts, Canada's digital literacy centre.

== Awards and honours ==
Chan is the recipient of the Meritorious Service Medal, the Queen's Diamond Jubilee Medal, the King's Coronation Medal and the Public Service Award of Excellence for his contributions to Canadian public life.
