= House hippo =

Fictional animal in Canadian television public service announcement

The house hippo is a fictitious species of hippopotamus, and the subject of a Canadian television public service announcement (PSA) produced by Concerned Children's Advertisers in May 1999 and reintroduced by MediaSmarts in 2019.

== Background ==
Concerned Children's Advertisers was a Canadian non-profit organization dedicated to public service announcements targeting children between the ages of eight and 12.

== Content ==
The house hippo pushing a piece of paper

The spot shows footage and describes the behaviour of the "North American house hippo", a fictional animal found "throughout Canada, and the eastern United States". The animal is described as sleeping for 16 hours per day, and enjoying a diet of raisins, chips and "crumbs from peanut butter on toast". The hippo is shown foraging in a kitchen, confronting a house cat, and making a nest from lost mittens to go to sleep.

The stated intent of the piece is to educate children about critical thinking with regard to what they see in television advertising, and remind them that "it's good to think about what you're watching on TV, and ask questions".

== Production ==
The original house hippo spot was just over one minute long. The piece was directed by Tim Hamilton (Avion Films) and used live action in combination with visual effects from Spin Productions.

The hippo was portrayed with the use of modified stock footage: video from "various sources" was rotoscoped with Commotion software filling in between frames. Artist Rob Fiumano edited the footage, for example adding in feet that were obscured in the original videos. To incorporate this material into the live-action video, Spin added shadowing, blurring, focus rolls and colour correction "to bring the stock and original footage together seamlessly".

The piece is narrated by Len Carlson in the style of a Hinterland Who's Who spot. The composer and sound designer was Eric Harry.

== Awards ==
"The Hidden World of the House Hippo" was the winner of the Golden Marble Award in the category of best public service advertising in 1999. This award recognizes "outstanding achievement in kids advertising".

== Adaptations ==
European company Media Smart adapted the footage in 2002 to create a new commercial for UK television. The UK version was considerably shorter and featured new narration and background music as well as a new ending promoting the company's website.

Canadian media literacy nonprofit MediaSmarts created a new version of the PSA in 2019 as part of its Break the Fake campaign. The new version, produced by Ottawa media production firm HyperActive, was more explicit that the hippo was not real and was accompanied by lesson plans to encourage teachers to use the PSA in their classes. The video was revised to remind children that they should not trust everything they see on the internet. (Companies Committed to Kids, the successor to Concerned Children's Advertisers, folded in 2017.)

In 2026, the Toronto Zoo revived the house hippo in a series of commercials set within parts of Toronto, including the CN Tower.

== See also ==
- Moo Deng
- Pygmy hippopotamus
