= WayUp =

US-based job site and mobile app

WayUp, Inc.
- Type: Private
- Founded: September 1, 2014
- Founder: JJ Fliegelman and Liz Wessel
- Headquarters: New York City
- Key people: Liz Wessel, CEO and cofounder JJ Fliegelman, CTO and cofounder
- Products: Career website for students and recent grads
- Website: www.wayup.com

WayUp is a US-based job site and mobile app for college students and recent graduates. Job candidates using the service complete an online profile that matches them with employers based on the candidate's interests, experience, and skills. The site had more than 3.5 million users and 300,000 participating employers as of March 2017.

WayUp Inc. was founded in 2014 under the name Campus Job, two years after founders Liz Wessel and JJ Fliegelman graduated from University of Pennsylvania. The site went live that August. It grew by approximately 1,000 users per week and had 7,500 job listings within a month of launching. The website was initially intended to connect students with part-time or temporary student jobs, such as being a campus representative for a brand. It later expanded to jobs for recent graduates within a few years after college.

WayUp raised almost $1 million in seed funding, followed by $9 million in series A funding and $18.5 million in a series B funding round. In 2017, it acquired competitor Looksharp and introduced new user profile features that emphasize the personality and extra-curricular activities of candidates. WayUp also introduced "National Intern Day," which is celebrated on the fourth Thursday of July. In July 2021, WayUp announced it was merging with the recruitment software company Yello.

== See also ==
- List of employment websites
