= Jobindex =

Danish job portal

Jobindex A/S
- Company type: Aktieselskab
- Traded as: First North: JOBNDX
- Industry: Job search engine
- Founded: February 1996
- Founder: Kaare Danielsen
- Headquarters: Frederiksberg, Denmark
- Number of employees: 85 (2012)
- Website: www.jobindex.dk

Jobindex is a job portal, founded in 1996 by Kaare Danielsen.

Originally made for the Danish market, the company has since expanded to have sites in 3 other countries.

Jobindex maintains Dansk Jobindex, an index on the number of Danish job postings.

== See also ==
- Employment website
