= Robert Hohman =

Founder and former CEO of Glassdoor

Robert Hohman (born 1970/71) is the co-founder and chairman of Glassdoor, the jobs and recruiting site, which was acquired by Recruit Holdings in 2018. Hohman was CEO of Glassdoor from 2007 to 2020.

== Early life and education ==
Hohman grew up in a blue collar family near Canton, Ohio. He began writing software at age 12. He spent summers earning money on his grandparents' farm baling hay in order to buy memory for his VIC-20 computer.

By high school, he was writing COBOL code for an accounting firm.

He received his bachelor's and master's degrees in computer science from Stanford University. While at Stanford, Hohman and Victor Jih co-founded Victory Briefs, the largest debate camp organizer in North America.

== Career ==
Hohman joined Microsoft in 1993 and as a software developer and participated in the team that built Expedia.

In 2006, he quit his job as president of Hotwire to do nothing but play World of Warcraft for a year — after hitting the maximum level, he quit and started Glassdoor. Hohman is a passionate competitor in League of Legends.

== Gaming ==
Hohman is a passionate competitor in League of Legends. He is a minority owner of the North American eSports organization Cloud9.
