= Bensimon Byrne =

Canadian advertising agency

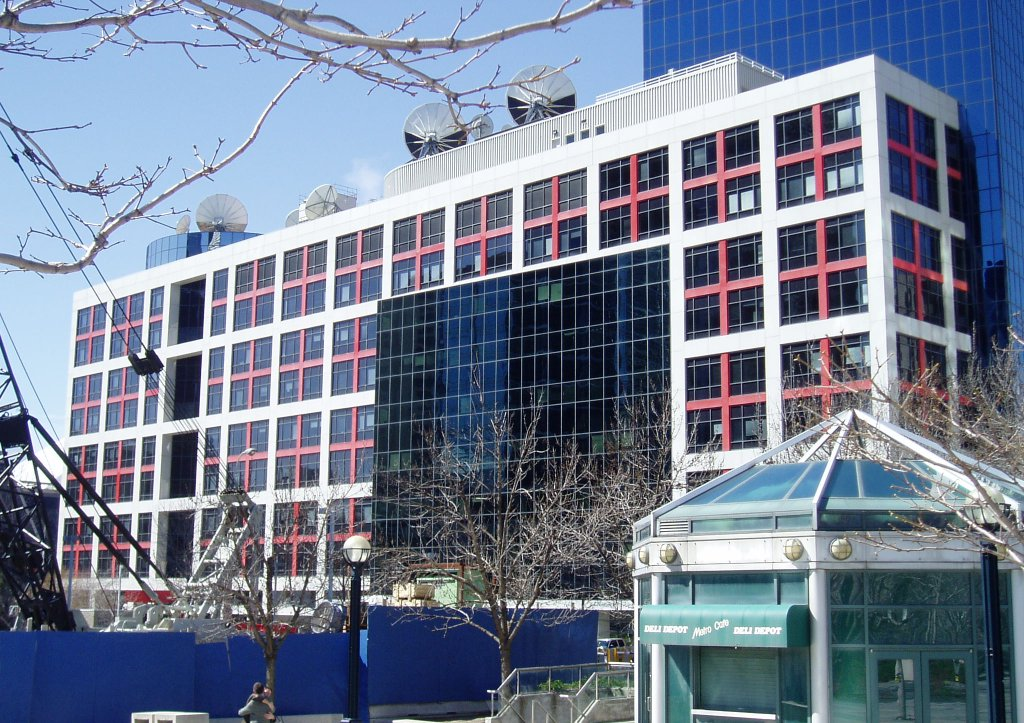
- Headquarters in the Canadian Broadcasting Centre, Toronto, Ontario, Canada
- Type: Public limited company
- Industry: Communications; Advertising; Public relations
- Founded: 1992
- Headquarters: Toronto, Ontario, Canada
- Area served: Canada
- Key people: Jack Bensimon (founding partner and board chair); David Rosenberg (partner and chief creative officer); Joseph Bonnici (partner and creative director)
- Services: media; public relations and public affairs; brand consulting
- Owners: Jack Bensimon, Colleen Peddie, David Rosenberg, Amin Todai and Joseph Bonnici
- Number of employees: 225
- Parent: Tadiem
- Subsidiaries: Narrative, OneMethod
- Website: www.bensimonbyrne.com

Bensimon Byrne is Canada's largest independent advertising agency, based in Toronto, Canada.

== History ==
The company was founded in 1994 by Jack Bensimon and Peter Byrne with Eaton's department store as its first client. The firm later acquired the Toronto digital agency OneMethod in 2012. From 2000 to 2005, the company reinstated the I Am Canadian slogan for beer brewer company Molson Canadian, a slogan which had been discontinued the year before by agency MacLaren McCann.

Bensimon Byrne Chief Creative Office David Rosenberg oversaw Justin Trudeau's successful 2015 Canadian federal election campaign. Prior to this, the company had worked on other successful Canadian Liberal Party campaigns, such as those for Kathleen Wynne, Paul Martin, and Dalton McGuinty.

As of 2016, the company had 225 staff members. In 2017, the company (including its subsidiaries Narrative and OneMethod) moved its office into the Canadian Broadcasting Centre in Toronto, Canada. The firm is currently attempting an expansion into the US market.

== Political attack ads ==
The firm is noted for its production of attack ads for federal and provincial Liberal Party campaigns, such as ads during the 2004 Canadian federal election campaign warning that Stephen Harper would have sent troops to Iraq, weakened gun laws, and not protected a woman's right to choose, ads during Paul Martin's 2006 campaign warning that the Conservatives would put "soldiers with guns" on the streets and ads during the 2018 Ontario general election targeting "the real Doug Ford." Justin Trudeau's team rejected the firm's advice to use attack ads during the 2015 Canadian federal election.

== Notable clients ==
- Scotiabank
- Constellation Brands
- Nestle
- Liberal Party of Canada
- Liberal Party of Ontario
- Loblaw
- Google
- Workopolis
- Canadian Football League
- Jackson-Triggs
