= Round Table Advertising =

Canadian advertising agency based in Toronto, Ontario

- Company type: Private
- Founded: 2000
- Headquarters: Toronto, Ontario, Canada
- Area served: North America
- Key people: Sallah Cayer, Partner; Brent Peterson, Partner
- Services: Advertising, Marketing, Branding, Media Planning & Buying
- Website: http://www.roundtableadvertising.com

Round Table Advertising (Round Table) is a privately held full-service advertising agency located in Toronto, Ontario. The company was founded as Round Table Advertising Inc. in 2000 by former co-workers Sallah Cayer, Fiona Gallagher, and Brent Peterson.

The company asserts it is "a senior hands on, caring and committed group that offers experience, discipline and leadership with a working style that is collaborative, efficient and effective".

== Clients ==
Round Table's past and present clients include:

- Alliance Atlantis - Showcase Television
- Burnbrae Farms
- Concerned Children's Advertisers
- COTA Health
- Fairmont Hotels and Resorts
- First Base
- Toronto.com
- Janes Family Foods
- Park'N Fly
- Providence Healthcare
- Ronald McDonald House Charities
- Scottish & Newcastle - Strongbow Cider
- Shell Oil Company - Automotive Accessories
- Toronto Parking Authority
- Weston Bakeries Ltd.
- Workopolis

== Notable campaigns ==
A Toronto bus shelter, "shattered" with Strongbow advertising. The 1990–2005 Viacom logo can be shown.

Round Table has produced numerous campaigns for various Weston Bakeries Ltd. brands including Wonder Bread. Leading up to the 2010 Winter Games, the company produced several Olympic-themed advertisements for the brand. A 30-second television commercial shown during the games which featured children singing the Canadian anthem received national media attention.

In 2010, in an ongoing effort to promote the nutritional credentials of the Wonder bread brand, the company produced a 30-second television commercial referencing the brand's history and the changes in its product lineup.

In 2008 Weston Bakeries Ltd. introduced Canada's first sliced bread with Omega 3 DHA. As part of a multimillion-dollar Canada-wide campaign, Round Table developed television commercials as well as print ads aimed at consumers, dietitians, doctors, and pediatricians.

In the summer of 2007, Scottish & Newcastle ran its first advertising campaign in Canada for the popular British beverage, Strongbow Cider. The campaign included various non-traditional executions of outdoor advertising.

== Awards ==
Round Table Advertising has been recognized on numerous occasions for outstanding work in several categories:

- The CASSIES Awards
  - 2007 Bronze - Packaged Goods - Food - Wonder Plus
  - 2007 Bronze - Best Launch - Wonder Plus
  - 2006 Silver - Off To A Good Start - Wonder Plus
  - 2003 Certificate of Excellence - Quebec & Regional English - Toronto.com
  - 2002 Certificate of Excellence - Off To A Good Start - Toronto.com
- Promax Awards
  - 2007 North America PROMAX Silver - Branding/Image Campaign Using One or More Media
  - 2007 North America BDA Bronze - Total Package Design: Image All Inclusive Combination
- Media Innovation Awards
  - 2008 Certificate - Television - Wonder
  - 2007 Bronze - Radio - Workopolis
  - 2003 Silver - Television - Wonder
