= Trovit =

Spanish vertical search engine for classifieds

Trovit Search S.L.U.
- Company type: Private
- Website type: classifieds
- Available in: English
- Founded: 2006
- Headquarters: Barcelona, Spain
- Founders: Iñaki Ecenarro (CEO); Raúl Puente; Daniel Giménez; Enrique Domínguez
- Website: www.trovit.co.uk www.trovit.com
- Launched: 2007
- Current status: active

Trovit is a Spanish vertical search engine for classifieds (real estate, jobs, cars and products). In March 2012, it became the leading search engine for classified ads in Europe and Latin America. On 2016, Trovit reached 51 countries worldwide, being available in 19 languages and receiving more than 90 million unique visitors every month.

The name "Trovit" is derived from "trovis", the Esperanto word for "found".

== Company ==
Trovit was founded in late 2006 by Iñaki Ecenarro, Raúl Puente, Daniel Giménez and Enrique Domínguez, and backed by private investors]. It launched Trovit Spain as well as Trovit UK on March 30, 2007, and in 2016 was present in 51 countries worldwide. Trovit generated revenues of €17.6m and EBIT of €5.9m in 2013. On 7 October 2014, 100% of the classifieds aggregator announced the acquisition by publicly listed Japanese real estate information services provider NEXT (currently LIFULL) for EUR 80 m (JPY 11bn).

== Search Engine ==
Trovit crawls real estate, cars and jobs classified ads from thousands of websites worldwide. Users can type a search, refine the results using filters and set up personalized alerts (e-mail and RSS feeds) to be notified about new ads that might interest them. When users click on an ad, Trovit redirects them to the original source.

Users can access Trovit through the Desktop and Mobile web version, or through the iOS and Android Apps.

The result page for real estate listings integrates Google Maps to geolocate properties.

== Criticism ==
The Trovit search index is as precise and current as the data provided by its sources (portals and websites), and these depend on the data supplied by agents, recruiters and users. The quality of these results depends on the motivation of those sources to update the information.

In some markets, such as Spain and Italy, the real estate market is based on non-exclusive contracts between sellers and estate agents. These agents try to avoid revealing the precise information about the property when they publish it on the Internet. In this case, Trovit cannot geolocate the properties precisely on the map.

In the job market the situation is very different, and in markets such as the UK the fragmentation is significant. Trovit can index thousands of ads using its duplicate control system.

The car market is linked to large internet directories and the access to dealers, the final sellers of the product, is very complicated.

== See also ==
- Employment website
