= CareerArc Social Recruiting =

- Website type: Company
- Owner: CareerArc Group
- Website: https://www.careerarc.com/
- Commercial: Yes
- Launched: 2009
- Current status: Active

CareerArc Social Recruiting (formerly TweetMyJobs) is a social recruiting software company headquartered in Burbank, California. The company was founded in March 2009, and is a division of CareerArc Group. The company has offices in Burbank, California, and Marlborough, Massachusetts. The platform provides a social recruiting system to connect job seekers with hiring employers.

== History ==
The company was founded in 2009 as TweetMyJobs.

On November 7, 2011, TweetMyJobs launched a version of their platform designed for veterans as part of the Joining Forces initiative announced by President Barack Obama. Aneesh Chopra, the former CTO of the United States, wrote a blog post stating that "leaders in social media have joined the movement... Twitter, through TweetMyJobs, will reach millions of veterans through their networks."

TweetMyJobs' government platform was announced on January 19, 2012, when the city of Atlanta, Georgia, launched atlanta.tweetmyjobs.com to help Atlanta residents find work. Subsequently, the government platform was launched in Newark, New Jersey; Houston, Texas; Nassau County, New York; Ramapo, New York; Columbia, South Carolina; and the territory of Puerto Rico.

On July 23, 2015, the company announced it is rebranding as CareerArc Social Recruiting.

On April 3, 2024, the company expanded to include automated video creation, through the acquisition of Lumina, a popular HR technology startup. After using the Lumina integration, a major U.S. health system and long-time CareerArc customer reported, "more engagement, more job clicks per post, and better reach than a traditional static post."

== See also ==
- Employment website
