= Monis Rahman =

Pakistani entrepreneur

- Born: Lahore, Punjab, Pakistan
- Education: University of Wisconsin; Stanford University
- Occupations: CEO, Rozee.pk; Chairman & Co-Founder, Finja; Chairman & Co-Founder, Dukan
- Website: www.rozee.pk www.finja.pk www.dukan.pk

Monis Rahman is a Pakistani internet entrepreneur, venture capitalist and businessman. Rahman is the co-founder and executive chairman of Naseeb Networks, Inc. a business-oriented social network used primarily for online job recruiting. Rahman has been listed among the top entrepreneurs of 21st century several times. Forbes named him at #6 on its list of top "Ten Big Hitting Asian Businessmen under 50".

== Career ==
=== Early years ===
After completing his studies at Wisconsin, Rahman went to work at Intel. With the Intel team, he developed an Itanium microprocessor chip between 1991 and 1996 and left the job after looking at the dot-com bubble rise in order to start his own company. In 1997, Rahman and a partner started a company that installed cameras in daycare centers, allowing parents to watch the video streams online in real time. Edaycare.com attracted $2.5 million from investors, including Ron Conway, an early stage investor of Google and PayPal. A year later Rahman and his partner ran out of money, forcing them to sell the company for stock that was beneficially worthless.

=== Naseeb Networks, Inc. ===
After a hiatus of four years and working as a consultant, Rahman decided to start a social networking site for Muslims in the United States and United Kingdom, after looking at the success of similar website Friendster.com. He named it "Naseeb.com" (meaning "destiny"). Built as a social site, it was considered more of match-making portal, but Rahman said, "I decided not to go head-on as a matchmaking site... 'Dating' has a negative stigma from a Muslim viewpoint." Naseeb.com was then invested in by LinkedIn co-founder Reid Hoffman with $25,000, while Mark Pincus of Zynga and Joe Kraus of Excite also stepped in as angel investors.

Describing the inspiration behind Naseeb, Rahman said, "I was exploring the Pakistani market since my family had moved here. I realized that the biggest cost in running a web company was of human capital. And the running cost in Pakistan would have been 1/18th of what it would have been in the US. So that's when I decided to come back and start Naseeb.com, which exploded very quickly. We were the first one to be doing any kind of serious business on the internet back then. And we had little to no competition in the market."

In 2002, Rahman returned to Pakistan and registered his company as Naseeb Networks, Inc., both in Lahore, Pakistan, and in San Jose, California, US, to make it easier to raise money and investors. He spent $60,000 as a startup cost for Naseeb and initially handled the company on his own. To prime the market, he used equity in the company to buy the electronic greeting card site eidmubarak.com, which allow Muslims to send cards for Eid, a Muslim holiday. Three thousand people from the site's 1-million-strong mailing list signed up immediately. Annual memberships cost $40, and by 2005 the website was generating $300,000 in revenue.

With the expansion of company Rahman needed programmers and developers, and buying ads in local newspapers was expensive. He recalls, "I started Naseeb.com from my house, but later moved out as we grew. Now when hiring, I ran into a lot of problems finding the right talent. At that time, one job ad in the classified section in Dawn News, roughly cost PKR 850,000 which was ridiculous! So I decided to put my ads online. Unfortunately, today Naseeb.com has gone bankrupt as the site no longer exists on a google search"

=== Rozee.pk ===
In 2005, Rahman built a "quick and dirty" job site to post job openings for his parent company Naseeb Networks. Many other companies contacted Rahman to post their companies' and products' ads on his website. Rahman agreed to post their ads free of cost to help boost Naseeb's traffic. After receiving such a reception, the website became the primary business of Naseeb Networks.

Rahman then offered the largest companies the ability to search for résumés, as well as software to power their own companys' job boards and the right to post their logos on the front page of his new site. He named it "Rozee", an Urdu language word which means "livelihood", or translates roughly as "blessed livelihood."

In 2007 Rozee.pk went into a completely functioning state, generating more traffic than Naseeb. Rahman used Naseeb's proceeds, and $2 million from Draper Fisher Jurvetson and ePlanet Ventures, to hire salespeople to go after large corporate clients, most of which still advertised job openings in newspapers. More than 63 000 companies actively post openings on Rozee.pk, paying between $29 for a single ad and up to $20,000 for a suite of services.

Rozee.pk has been listed as the number one employment website in Pakistan, with more than 65 thousand companies posting jobs, 32.53 million applications processed and 6 million unique visitors every day. In 2015, Rozee.pk won $6.5 million of investment from Vostok Nafta and Piton Capital, bringing the company's total venture capital funding to $8.5 million.

In an interview Rahman stated, "As talent continues to move online at a rapid pace in emerging markets, businesses need increasingly sophisticated recruiting technology customized to nuanced local market dynamics."

It was the latest in a series of large venture capital investments in Pakistan over the previous year and a half. Managing director Per Brilioth said, "We are excited to partner with Naseeb Networks and impressed with what Rahman and his team have achieved in Pakistan and Saudi Arabia... We believe these markets present massive growth opportunities and are looking forward to working with the team to expand the reach of Naseeb Networks' world-class products and services." Michael Porter of AllWorld Network listed the company as one of Pakistan's fastest growing private companies. American writer Elmira Bayrasli visited Pakistan in 2010 to assess the entrepreneurial potential of the country and listed Rahman as an "example to entrepreneurs" in her 2015 book, From the Other Side of the World. She claimed that the "next Silicon Valley could be in Lahore, Mumbai or Istanbul."

=== Chalo.pk ===
In 2011, Rahman launched a location-based online shopping portal that features "local daily deals and listings for the most affordable things to do, place to eat, and brands to buy" in cities throughout Pakistan. Rahman said, "Chalo is my experiment. We have hundreds of SMEs in Pakistan who can't afford to promote themselves on large platforms like newspapers, billboards, TV etc. We're helping them expand & grow through Chalo.pk... We're also experimenting with Maps. We spent 2 years building our own maps database, and now we have mapped every single house address in any planned society in Lahore. We’ve also mapped all the restaurants, their menus and other details in the app. So people can navigate to them really easily. If you want to watch a movie, we're listing all the movies being shown in all the cities, and soon we'll be adding a Buy button."

=== Digital Publishers Association of Pakistan ===
In 2012, Rahman co-founded the Digital Publishers Association of Pakistan (DPAP), with several publications and portal owners including Masood Hamid (President), Monis Rahman (Vice President), Sarmad A. Ali (Member Executive Committee), Lucas Peter (Secretary General), Imran Ansari (Joint Secretary), Qudratullah Shahab (Member Executive Committee), and Sarah Sohail (Finance Secretary). The association aims to "safeguard interests of all stakeholders in the burgeoning digital market and create a regulated playing field."

=== Mihnati.com acquisition ===
In 2013, Rozee.pk bought Saudi employment website Mihnati.com for an undisclosed amount. Discussing the acquisition, Rahman said, "We have merged both Rozee.pk and Mihnati by migrating all Mihnati employers and jobseekers on to the Rozee.pk technology platform. By doing this, we gave our Saudi sales team a far more powerful product to sell with more features."

== Other works and future ventures ==
After establishing himself, Rahman served as a head or partner of several technology firms in Pakistan, including as a member of the board of directors at Kashf Microfinance Bank Limited (2010-2012), and of the Pakistan Advisory Board at Acumen Fund (2010-2013). Currently he is a member of the Young Presidents' Organization (2010) Governing Board (CEC) at Pakistan Software Houses Association for IT and ITES (P@SHA) (2013), Secretary General and founding member at Digital Publishers Association of Pakistan (DPAP), and a member of the Global Board of Trustees (BoT) at The Indus Entrepreneurs (TiE, Lahore) (2012).

Rahman is regarded as one of the best entrepreneurs of the country. Many have listed him in their top ten lists of CEOs and entrepreneurs. In 2016, Rahman was listed among the top CEOs of Pakistan, was placed at No. 6 among the Top 10 Most Influential Tech Leaders of Pakistan, and was ranked at #3 among the "Top 5 E-commerce Business Tycoons of Pakistan". Rahman is a TED speaker and is frequently invited to talk on entrepreneurship and Internet marketing at the world's top business schools and conferences.

In 2016, Rahman together with Qasif Shahid developed a digital mobile wallet to increase digital payments' scale rapidly. The mobile wallet is telco, bank and handset agnostic with the philosophy of inter-operating collaboratively with existing payment plumbing. It is jointly funded by Finca Microfinance Bank and the e-company Finja. In an interview Qasif said, "We believe banking products should look more like social networks than conventional banking products." Rahman said, "Our mobile wallet's open API platform will allow much needed collaborative creativity from other FinTechs to be leveraged to create building blocks for a wider array of useful financial products."

== Awards and honors ==
- 2008: International Data Group CIO Pakistan Pioneer in Innovation Award
- 2011: Forbes "Ten Big Hitting Asian Businessmen under 50"
- 2012: Pakistan Power 100 Excellence Award
