= CareerStructure =

UK employment website

- Website type: Job board
- Owner: TotalJobs (Axel Springer SE)
- Website: www.careerstructure.com
- Registration: Optional
- Launched: 2006; 20 years ago
- Current status: Active

CareerStructure is a UK employment website, owned and operated by TotalJobs UK. TotalJobs UK was a subsidiary of Reed Elsevier Group plc until 2012, when it was sold to Axel Springer AG. CareerStructure was established in November 2006 as a specialist job site, initially for UK construction industry professionals. In March 2008 the International Zone was launched that includes listings for construction jobs abroad.

The site also features a news section that was launched in 2008, and a career advice section that includes information and advice on the numerous job types in the construction industry. Also featured in this section is information on current trends in the construction and built environment industry. Due to the increasing demand for green development in the construction and built environment industry, the Green Zone was launched in September 2009.

== Salary Benchmarker ==
In 2010 CareerStructure conducted a salary survey of professionals working in construction and the built environment. A pop-up survey was placed on CareerStructure and emailed to registered job seekers. In total 5,723 responses were received from individuals based both in the UK and abroad. The data from the survey was incorporated into the Salary Benchmarker tool which launched in February 2011. Information relates to the specific job type, sector, location and level of experience of the average individual that meets the selected criteria. Within this the average remuneration, benefits and expectations are displayed in the tool.

== See also ==
- Employment website
