= Insidetrak =

Insidetrak.com.au
- Website type: Job Search Engine
- Available in: English
- Founded: 2012; 14 years ago
- Headquarters: Sydney, Australia
- Owner: Insidetrak Pty Ltd
- Key people: Michael Larsen (CEO)
- Employees: 6 (2012)
- Website: www.insidetrak.com.au
- Commercial: Yes
- Registration: Optional
- Current status: Active

Insidetrak is an Australian employment website that provides job listings and workplace reviews. It functions as a vertical search engine by aggregating job postings from various sources, including job boards and company career pages. The platform aims to combine job opportunities with user-generated insights about potential employers, allowing job seekers to make more informed decisions. The website features a proprietary database of workplace reviews, which are subject to a review process and content moderation systems designed to ensure compliance with community guidelines.

Job advertisements can be posted free of charge on the site. As of now, Insidetrak's revenue model remains unspecified, though available information suggests a potential pay-per-click (PPC) advertising model described as "a-la-carte performance enhancement."

Insidetrak operates exclusively within Australia and has been described as a local counterpart to the U.S.-based employment website Glassdoor.

== See also ==
- News Limited
- Employment website
