= JobTiger =

- Website type: Job search engine
- Headquarters: Sofia, Bulgaria
- Creator: Bulgarian-American Investments Fund
- Website: www.jobtiger.bg/about.php?ln=1
- Launched: November 2000; 25 years ago
- Current status: Active

JobTiger is a Bulgarian website and human resources company. It was founded in 2001 by the Bulgarian-American Investments Fund. Employers that have used the website to advertise jobs include Microsoft and Cisco Systems.

JobTiger won awards in the "Investor in the Human Capital and Working Conditions" category at the 2005 and 2006 the Bulgarian Business Leaders Forum. The awards acknowledged JobTiger's organization of forums for student internship careers. Together with the Bulgarian Forum of Donors, GloBul, the United Bank of Bulgaria, OMV and the First Investment Bank, the company is also a co-founder of the Club of Corporate Donors – the first of this kind in Bulgaria. The establishment of the Club of Corporate Donors aims to develop and promote strategic business donation in Bulgaria.
