= MediaSmarts =

Canadian non-profit organization and registered charity

- Formation: 1994
- Type: Nonprofit
- Legal status: active
- Purpose: advocate and public voice, educator and network for digital and media literacy
- Headquarters: 205 Catherine Street, Ottawa, Ontario, K2P 1C3
- Region served: Canada
- Official language: English, French
- Chair: Suzanne Morin
- Website: mediasmarts.ca (en) habilomedias.ca (fr)
- Formerly called: Media Awareness Network

MediaSmarts (French: HabiloMédias; formerly the Media Awareness Network, MNet) is a Canadian non-profit organization and registered charity based in Ottawa, Ontario, that focuses on digital and media literacy programs and resources. In particular, the organization promotes critical thinking via educational resources and analyzes the content of various types of mass media.

Surveys and studies performed by MediaSmarts have explored youth media consumption, such as television and internet use, as well as media issues. In recent years, the organization's focus has shifted more heavily to digital literacy, although it continues to produce resources on traditional media. The funding for MediaSmarts is primarily derived from private sector sponsors and federal government grants. The group has also partnered with Microsoft and Bell Canada to produce web resources for teachers and parents to protect kids online.

MediaSmarts has received a number of awards for its work, including awards from UNESCO Global Alliance for Partnerships on Media and Information and the Canadian Race Relations Foundation, as well as several online awards for web-based content.

== Activities ==
=== Research ===
The organization's educational resources, public awareness campaigns, and policy recommendations are grounded in original research. In collaboration with various partners, MediaSmarts designs and facilitates qualitative and quantitative research projects and conducts evaluations of their programs and resources.

The organization's Young Canadians in a Wireless World (YCWW) study is Canada’s longest running and most comprehensive research study on young people’s attitudes and behaviours regarding the internet, surveying over 20,000 parents, teachers and students since 2000.

The findings from YCWW are used to set benchmarks for research on children’s use of the internet, technology and digital media and inform policy on the digital economy, privacy, online safety, online harms and digital well-being, digital citizenship and digital media literacy, among other topics.

These findings have also been used to develop MediaSmarts’ USE, UNDERSTAND & CREATE: Digital Literacy Framework for Canadian Schools. This research study informs other projects at MediaSmarts and other organizations, including academic institutions.

YCWW is currently in its fourth phase. Phase IV began with a name change to the study – from Young Canadians in a Wired World to Young Canadians in a Wireless World. This change in language speaks to shifts in digital technology and the internet (since 2000) from a ‘wired’ to ‘wireless’ world that presents new opportunities and challenges for youth, parents/guardians, educators, policymakers and the technology sector.

In addition to YCWW research, MediaSmarts produces papers—both independently and in partnership with other organizations—on a variety of media issues, including digital literacy, privacy education, online civic engagement, food marketing, and Internet governance.

=== Education ===
MediaSmarts provides resources for educators, parents, youth and all Canadians. Their resources for the general public include tip sheets, videos, guides and blog posts.

Their K-12 resources cover a wide range of issues related to digital media literacy. They are easily integrated into existing curriculum as they are aligned with classroom outcomes for all the provinces and territories. The majority of their educational resources are freely available on their website. They include classroom lesson plans with work sheets and backgrounders, tip sheets and multimedia games and quizzes.

MediaSmarts developed a digital media literacy framework for Canadian schools called USE, UNDERSTAND & ENGAGE, which provides a road map for teaching digital media literacy skills in Canadian schools. The framework draws on nine framework topics of digital media literacy and provides teachers with supporting lessons and interactive resources that are linked to curriculum outcomes for every province and territory.

=== Campaigns ===
Media Literacy Week is a national campaign annually hosted each October by MediaSmarts and the Canadian Teachers' Federation to promote digital media literacy, with activities and events taking place in classrooms, libraries, museums, and community groups through over 140 collaborating organizations.

The event began in Canada in 2006 as National Media Education Week—changing its name to "Media Literacy Week" in 2009—and is now internationally celebrated, such as in the US and in countries around the world.

In 2019, as part of their Break the Fake campaign (funded by Canadian Heritage), MediaSmarts remade the popular house hippo public service announcement with the Ottawa-based creative agency HyperActive. The house hippo was originally created by a similar, since-defunct organization called Companies Committed to Kids.

In 2022, MediaSmarts launched Digital Citizen Day, a new national awareness day in October to remind Canadians that everyone is a digital citizen and we have the power to impact our online spaces for the better. The goal of the day is to encourage ethical and responsible digital citizenship.

== History ==
The organization was founded as the Media Awareness Network (MNet) in 1994 under the auspices of the National Film Board of Canada (NFB). The following year, MNet began to receive seed funding from Bell Canada, CBC, Western International Communications, CHUM Television, as well as from the federal departments Health Canada, Justice Canada, Canadian Heritage, Industry Canada, and the Department of Foreign Affairs and International Trade. Soon after, in 1996, the MNet would be incorporated as an independent non-profit organization, along with launching its media education website. Three years later, it was granted charitable status.

In 1999, with the help of MNet's work, the Canadian Radio-television and Telecommunications Commission (CRTC) announced that it would not regulate the Internet. In 2001, with MNet as a key partner, the federal government released its "Cyberwise" strategy on addressing illegal and offensive content on the Internet.

On 29 May 2012, one year after their 15th anniversary, the organization was relaunched as MediaSmarts. The new brand was developed pro-bono by Toronto-based advertising agency, Brandworks.

In 2014, MediaSmarts partnered with the Information and Communications Technology Council to host a Youth and Digital Skills symposium to advance the development of digital literacy skills in Canada. In 2016, the organization partnered with the CRTC, NFB, and Canadian Heritage in a Youth Discoverability Summit, exploring the ways in which youth access content in the modern age.

== Organization ==
=== Board of directors ===
MediaSmarts is governed by an elected, volunteer Board of Directors, which includes representatives of media companies and such stakeholder sectors as education, libraries, and community- and youth-serving organizations.

=== Sponsors ===
The funding for MediaSmarts is primarily derived from private sector sponsors and federal government grants. In particular, the work of MediaSmarts is supported by various companies and organizations.

As of January 2024, MediaSmarts sponsors include:

- APTN
- Bell Canada / Bell Media
- Google
- Meta
- National Film Board of Canada
- TELUS
- TikTok
- YouTube
- Wattpad

=== Partners ===
In the 2022 fiscal year, MediaSmarts partnered with the following organizations:

- AT&T
- BC Anti-Racism Network
- Canadian Commission for UNESCO
- Canadian Heritage
- Canadian Institutes of Health Research
- Canadian Practitioners Network for the Prevention of Radicalization and Extremist Violence
- Canadian Teachers’ Federation
- CBC Kids
- Centre de liaison de l'enseignement et des médias d'information
- Centre québécois d’éducation aux médias et à l’information
- Digital Public Square
- GAPMIL
- Get Cyber Safe
- Global Centre for Pluralism
- Global Network Against Hate
- Hands On Media Education
- Information and Privacy Commissioner of Ontario
- Innovation, Science and Economic Development Canada
- Institute for Research on Digital Literacy
- Media & Learning
- Mental Health in the Digital Age Lab- Ontario Tech University
- Montreal Institute for Genocide and Human Rights Studies
- Office of the Privacy Commissioner
- Public Health Agency of Canada
- Public Safety Canada
- School Libraries Canada
- Science Up First
- SecDev Foundation
- Sex Information & Education Council of Canada
- Surveillance Studies Network
- TELUS Wise
- The Information and Communications Technology Council
- The Sex Information & Education Council of Canada
- Toronto Public Library
- TVO Kids
- YWCA

Federal government partners

- Canadian Heritage
- CRTC
- Historica Canada
- ISED
- Office of the Privacy Commissioner
- Public Health Agency of Canada
- Public Safety Canada

University partners

- Carleton University
- Concordia University
- Simon Fraser University
- University of Toronto
- University of Waterloo

== Awards and recognition ==
MediaSmarts has received a number of awards for its work, including awards from UNESCO Global Alliance for Partnerships on Media and Information, as well as several online awards for web-based content.

In 1999, MNet was awarded the inaugural Canadian Race Relations Foundation Award of Excellence by the Canadian Race Relations Foundation in recognition of its "extensive collection of anti-racism education resources." In 2006, MNet was included as a Canadian "best practice" in UNESCO’s comprehensive Media Education: A Kit for Teachers, Students, Parents and Professionals.

Awards
Date	Award	Award category/recognition	Sponsor/host
1997 Oct	NAWeb Best of the Web	Best Educational Web Site, Private	World Wide Web Courseware Developers Association (North American Web Conference)
1998 June	Magic Lantern Award	Outstanding Achievement in the Field of Media Literacy in Education in Canada	Magic Lantern Communications
1998 June	AMTEC Award of Excellence	recognition of outstanding achievement in educational multimedia.	Association for Media and Technology in Education in Canada (AMTEC)
1998 Oct	NAWeb Best of the Web	Best Educational Web Site, K-12	World Wide Web Courseware Developers Association
1999 March	Award of Excellence in Race Relations	recognition of innovation and excellence in anti-racism education.	Canadian Race Relations Foundation
1999 Oct	NAWeb Best of the Web	Best Educational Web Site, K-12	World Wide Web Courseware Developers Association
2000 Dec	NAWeb Best of the Web	Best Educational Web Site, K-12	World Wide Web Courseware Developers Association
2001 April	Canarie IWAY Award	Award for Community Service	
2003	NAWeb Best of the Web	Educational Internet Site of the Year Award	
2004 Feb	WiredKids Excellence in Internet Awareness and Education Award	recognition "as a global leader in Internet safety education"	WiredSafety
2006 April	Summit Creative Awards	Youth Website (bronze)	Summit Awards
2009 Dec	MEDEA Awards	Highly Commended	Media & Learning Conference
2011 Nov 24	MEDEA Awards	Highly Commended	Media & Learning Conference
2018	UNESCO GAPMIL Global Media and Information Literacy Award	recognition of over 20 years of leadership in media literacy	UNESCO Global Alliance for Partnerships on Media and Information Literacy
