= Kalibrr =

Employment website

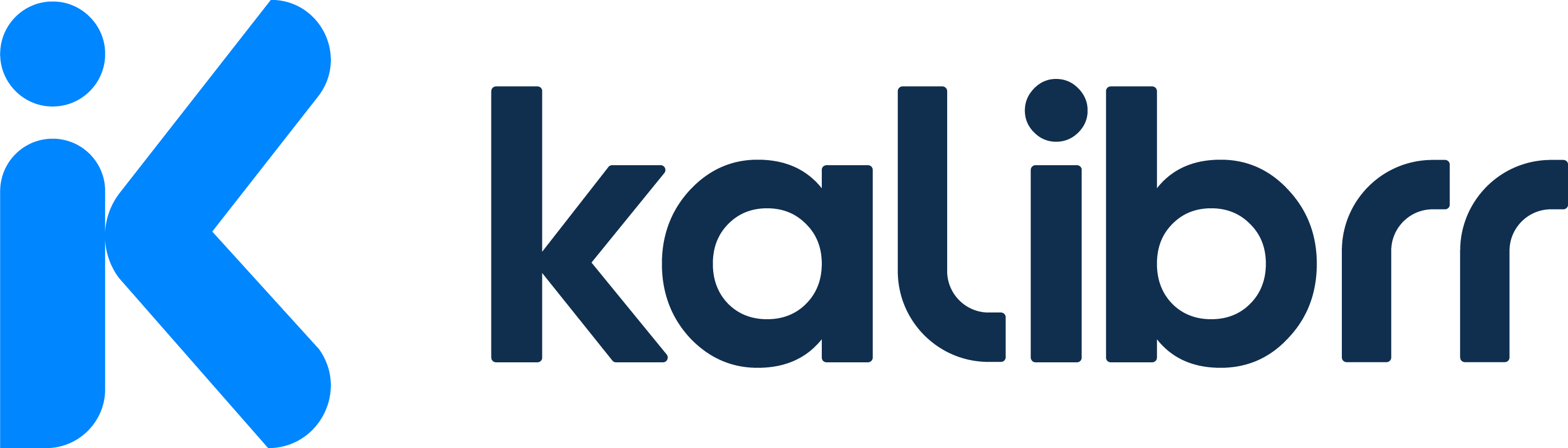
- Company type: Private
- Available in: English and Indonesian
- Founded: 2012; 14 years ago
- Headquarters: Makati, Philippines
- Area served: Philippines and Indonesia and United States
- Founders: Paul Rivera; Dexter Ligot-Gordon; Danny Castonguay; Sanuk Tandon
- CEO: Paul Rivera; Sanuk Tandon
- Products: Recruitment, Job board, Employer branding, Remote work, Professional employer organization, Payroll, Applicant Tracking System,
- Website: www.kalibrr.com
- Launched: 2013; 13 years ago

Kalibrr is a full-stack hiring platform that allows employers to recruit talents through its jobs portal, ATS (Applicant Tracking System), employer branding and EOR (Employer of Record) services. It also allows job seekers to create online professional profiles, complete cognitive, behavioral and technical assessments, and apply for job opportunities from around the world. As of January 2023, Kalibrr has 6+ million registered job seekers, primarily white-collar professionals from South East Asia, and it counts thousands of companies such as Coca-Cola, Google, McDonalds, Samsung and Unilever as clients.

Kalibrr was founded in 2013 in San Francisco, California and Makati, Philippines by Paul Rivera, Dexter Ligot-Gordon and Danny Castonguay. Kalibrr is currently headquartered in Makati, Philippines, with offices in San Francisco, Manila and Jakarta and its co-CEO's are Paul Rivera and Sanuk Tandon.

Kalibrr was the first startup from the Philippines to be accepted into Y Combinator and was funded by, Kickstart Ventures, Learn Capital, Patamar Capital, Omidyar Network, Wavemaker (Siemer Ventures), a16z and several venture firms. Kalibrr reached profitability in March 2021.

== History ==
Kalibrr is a play on the word caliber, a word often used when referencing high quality talent.

Kalibrr's vision is to connect talent with opportunities. When Kalibrr started in 2012, it built an education to employment platform that enabled Filipinos to develop their English, technical and soft-skills online so they would be matched with jobs in the Philippine BPO (Business Process Outsourcing) industry.

Kalibrr's initial co-founders were Paul Rivera, Dexter Ligot-Gordon, and Danny Castonguay. Paul started his career as a Product Manager at Mercantila, an early e-commerce company based in San Francisco which was eventually acquired by Google. After Mercantila, Paul spent some time at Google before leaving in 2007 to co-found Open Access BPO with Ben Davidowitz, a pioneering outsourcing company that focused on serving fast-growing tech companies in the San Francisco Bay Area. Paul successfully scaled that company and it was while building and scaling that business that he saw the problems in hiring and talent that inspired him to start Kalibrr.

Dexter was Paul's classmate at UC Berkeley where they both studied Political Economics and where Dexter was the UC Student Regent. Dexter spent his career as workforce consultant, helping design the systems that enabled governments like the City of San Francisco to create workforce development programs to help their constituents acquire the most relevant skills to qualify for fast growing local industries. Dexter exited Kalibrr in 2021 to launch his new venture, Swarm, a product, engineering and design community platform.

Danny Castonguay was the founder of Ant Portal, a Canadian software development company and he was studying for his MBA at MIT when he met Paul and Dexter in Manila in 2012. This MBA was sponsored by McKinsey. In 2014, Danny Castonguay departed his full-time role as Kalibrr's founding CTO to re-join McKinsey as a Consultant.

Kalibrr's fourth co-founder was Sanuk Tandon, who was previously a founding team member and COO of Vasham, an agritech startup which was acquired by an Asian agriculture conglomerate, Japfa. Sanuk joined Kalibrr in early 2016 to launch their Indonesia business, a pivotal moment transforming the company from a single country player to a regional startup. In 2018, Sanuk moved into the COO role before assuming his current Co-CEO role to help Kalibrr scale its commercial activities globally whilst transforming the company into a profitable enterprise.

In 2021, Kalibrr was among the four Philippine companies to be listed in Forbes Asia's "100 to Watch" list.

== Partnerships and awards ==
Kalibrr received a pioneering grant from the Asian Development Bank in 2015 that enabled Kalibrr to expand the suite of skills assessments it offered to jobseekers, assessments which are still used today and which have been used by millions of jobseekers.

Kalibrr was a publisher of jobs in Southeast Asia and saw an opportunity to increase its distribution by levering the largest platforms in the world. Kalibrr also partnered with the Philippine Government in 2015 to digitize tens of thousands of government jobs, helping bring government recruitment online for the first time. They struck the first partnership with LinkedIn in 2016, with Facebook Jobs in 2018 and with Google Jobs in 2019.

Kalibrr was selected as the Most Innovative Company in the 2016 Asia CEO Awards. Kalibrr is an Endeavor company, an Unreasonable company and its co-founder Paul Rivera was selected as a World Economic Forum Young Leader in 2021.
