= Indeed =

American worldwide job listing search engine

Indeed, Inc.
- Company type: Subsidiary (independent)
- Website type: Employment website
- Founded: November 2004; 22 years ago
- Headquarters: Austin, Texas, US; Stamford, Connecticut, US
- Founders: Paul Forster; Rony Kahan
- CEO: Hisayuki "Deko" Idekoba
- Employees: ~11,000
- Parent: Recruit
- Website: indeed.com
- Commercial: Yes
- Registration: required
- Current status: Active

Indeed, Inc. is an American multinational employment website for job listings launched in November 2004. It is an independent subsidiary of Japan-based company Recruit Holdings. It is headquartered in Austin, Texas, and Stamford, Connecticut, with additional offices around the world. Indeed is currently available in over 60 countries and 28 languages. In October 2010, Indeed.com surpassed Monster.com to become the highest-traffic job website in the United States.

The site aggregates job listings from thousands of websites, including job boards, others like staffing firms, associations, and company career pages. It generates revenue by selling premium job posting and resume features to employers and companies hiring. As a single topic search engine, its central functionality is an example of vertical search. In 2011, Indeed began allowing job seekers to apply directly to jobs on Indeed's site and offering resume posting and storage.

== History ==
Indeed was cofounded by Paul Forster and Rony Kahan in 2004 in both Austin, Texas, and Stamford, Connecticut. The Stamford offices house the company's sales, client services, finance, and human resources teams, while the product development staff is based in Austin.

In 2005, Indeed launched the beta version of their "pay-per-click job advertising network". In addition to searching job postings, it allows the frequency of specific words within these postings to be tracked over time, serving as a potential indicator of trends in the job markets. The company took an investment round of $5 million in funding from Union Square Ventures, The New York Times Company and Allen & Company.

Indeed operates in the UK via Indeed UK Operations Ltd, which is a subsidiary of Indeed Operations Ireland Ltd, whose ultimate holding company is Recruit Holding Co Ltd. Turnover in the UK for the year ending December 31, 2019, was £41.2m.

On October 1, 2012, Indeed was acquired by Japan-based Recruit Co. Ltd., becoming an independent operating unit.

On July 1, 2016, Recruit Holdings Co., Ltd. announced that it had acquired the assets of Indeed's competitor Simply Hired, which would become a publishing partner of Indeed.

On June 21, 2018, Recruit Holdings Co., Ltd. announced that it had acquired the assets of Glassdoor, which will operate as a distinct and separate part of its growing HR Technology business segment, aligning Glassdoor and Indeed as sister companies.

On May 30, 2019, Indeed announced that it had signed an agreement to acquire Syft, a leading recruiting platform for the hospitality, event, and light industrial sectors in the UK.

On July 12, 2019, Indeed announced that it had signed an agreement to acquire ClickIQ, an automated job advertising technology platform based in the UK.

In October 2022, Indeed announced plans to transition employers from its longstanding pay-per-click advertising model to a pay-per-application pricing model. The rollout drew criticism from employers, particularly small businesses, some of which reported unexpectedly high charges after applications that were not rejected within 72 hours became billable. Indeed executive Raj Mukherjee acknowledged that the company could have done a better job explaining the new system. Indeed subsequently paused plans to require the model and, in December 2023, discontinued pay-per-application pricing altogether, saying that it required too much additional effort from employers and did not adequately support their differing needs.

On March 22, 2023, Indeed announced that they would be laying off 2,200 employees, stated to be 15% of their workforce.

On May 13, 2024, Indeed laid off approximately 1,000 employees, or about 8% of the company. Indeed CEO Chris Hyams announced on May 13 in a letter to employees, a move driven in part by "a global slow-down in hiring," the message said. The vast majority of the layoffs were in the US, Hyams said, largely within R&D and the go-to-market teams. "While the global economy has improved in several areas over the past year, we are not yet set up for sustainable growth," Hyams said. “Despite our efforts so far, our organization is still too complex,” he continued, indicating that the company is aiming to "simplify" areas of the business to make decision-making faster.

In June 2025, Chris Hyams stepped down as CEO after six years in the position. He was succeeded by Recruit Holdings CEO Hisayuki Idekoba, who had previously served as Indeed's CEO from 2013 to 2019.

On July 10, 2025, the HR Technology segment of Recruit Holdings Co., Ltd., which operates Indeed and Glassdoor, announced a reduction of approximately 1,300 employees, representing about 6% of the segment's total workforce as of April 1, 2025. Four months after these layoffs, Indeed conducted another round of comparatively minor reductions in headcount, citing the role of AI on employment in the technology industry.

In July 2025, Recruit announced that Glassdoor's operations would be integrated into Indeed, with Glassdoor CEO Christian Sutherland-Wong leaving as part of the restructuring. The integration was completed on July 1, 2026, when Glassdoor LLC legally merged into Indeed, Inc., with Glassdoor continuing as a separate brand operated by Indeed.

== Sponsorship ==
Indeed is currently the main sponsor of German soccer club Eintracht Frankfurt. They also agreed a multi-year sponsorship deal with FC Utrecht and Brentford from the 2026–27 season.

== See also ==
- Employment website
- List of employment websites
