= CV-Library =

UK job board

CV-Library.co.uk
- Website type: employment website
- Available in: UK, US
- Founded: 2000
- Headquarters: Fleet, Hampshire
- Owner: Lee Biggins
- Founders: Lee Biggins and Brian Wakem
- Website: www.cv-library.co.uk
- Commercial: Yes
- Current status: Active

CV-Library is a UK job board that was launched in October 2000 as one of the country's first employment websites. As of 2016, the business is worth an estimated £200 million, and is the third-largest employment website in the UK. The job board hosts the UK's Second largest CV database ( behind Totaljobs ) of over 22 million CVs. CV-Library is based in Fleet, Hampshire.

The website is an example of vertical search. As of 2016 CV-Library is one of the top 500 most visited websites in the UK according to alexa.com.

In 2014 & 2015 CV-Library appeared in The Sunday Times’ Profit Track 100 list of businesses with the fastest growing profits in the UK. The company also appeared in the 2017 Sunday Times Tech Track 100 list of the 100 private tech companies with the fastest growing sales over the latest three years.

The site displays listings from thousands of employment agencies (recruitment consultants), direct employers, ad agencies, staffing firms and associations. In 2011, CV-Library became the first job website to allow candidates to apply for jobs on a mobile device and in 2012.

== History ==
Biggins co-founded CV-Library Ltd in 2000 with Brian Wakem, using a £9,000 bank loan. The business made no money in its first few years and started to gain traction in 2004.

As of 2017, the business is worth an estimated £200 million, and is the third-largest employment website in the UK. It boasts the 2nd largest CV database in the UK of over 12 million CVs.

Biggins is now the sole owner of the business, after completing a seven-figure internal buyout in 2013. In 2016, the business rolled out three regional offices, expanding its presence to London, Birmingham and Manchester. 2017 saw the company launch in Ireland.

=== Resume-Library ===
In 2015, Biggins launched Resume-Library, a global sister site to UK-based CV-Library, and in May 2016 Resume-Library opened its first US office in Boston, MA. In July 2016 Resume-Library was awarded the Silver Award for Startup of the Year, at the US-based Golden Bridge Business and Innovation Awards.

== See also ==
- Job hunting
- Recruitment
