= Kathryn Minshew =

American businesswoman

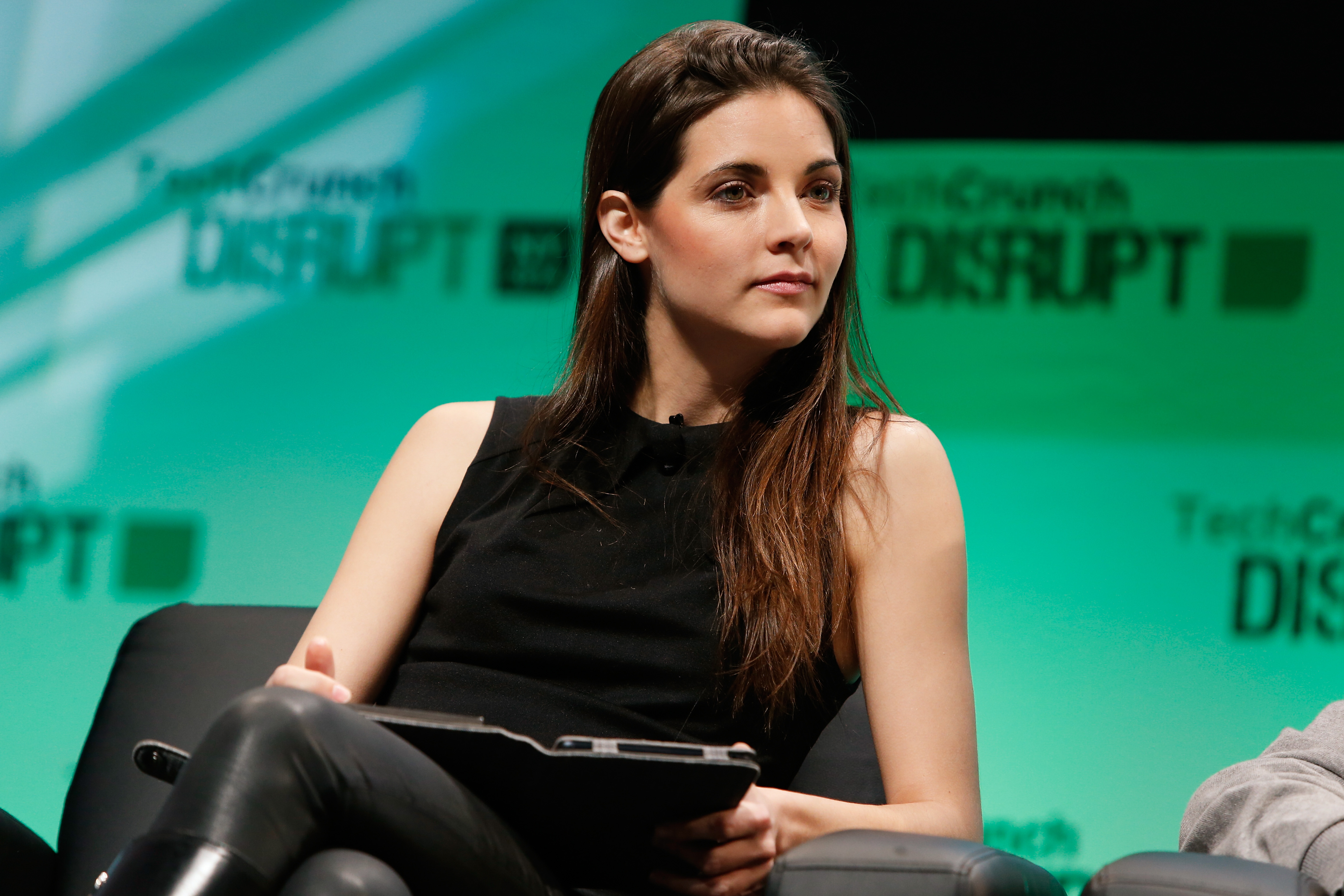
- Minshew in 2014
- Education: Duke University
- Occupations: Entrepreneur author writer public speaker
- Website: themuse.com

Kathryn Minshew is an American entrepreneur, the CEO and co-founder of The Muse, a career-development platform.

== Career ==
Minshew was a management consultant at McKinsey. She worked for the Clinton Health Access Initiative until 2010, when she co-founded Pretty Young Professionals. A disagreement with the cofounders of the company led to the dissolution of the Pretty Young Professionals.

In 2011, Minshew co-founded The Muse (originally called The Daily Muse) with Alexandra Cavoulacos and Melissa McCreery. Minshew is the CEO of The Muse and Cavoulacos is the COO. The Muse was accepted into tech accelerator YCombinator for the Winter 2012 class. Kathryn Minshew admitted she was rejected 148 times when pitching investors for seed money.

Minshew represented The Daily Muse in The Wall Street Journal Startup of the Year competition in Fall 2013, where she made the finals. Minshew has contributed to publications including Harvard Business Review, Fast Company, and Inc..

In January 2020, she launched the podcast The New Rules of Work.

== Recognition and awards ==
- 2011, 2012: Forbes 30 Under 30 in Media list
- 2012: Inc. list of 15 Women to Watch in Tech.
- 2012, 2015: Silicon Alley 100
- 2016: New York Future 50 Award winner by SmartCEO magazine
- 2016: Workforce Magazine Game Changer
- 2016: EY Entrepreneur of the Year finalist in 2016
- 2019: One of the winners of the inaugural One Young World Entrepreneur of the Year Award

== Books ==
- The New Rules of Work: The Modern Playbook for Navigating Your Career (co-authored with Alexandra Cavoulacos), Crown Business, 2017, 336 pages. ISBN 9780451495679
