= Workopolis =

Canadian website specializing in online job searching

- Available in: English, French
- Founded: 1999
- Headquarters: Toronto, Canada
- Area served: Canada
- Owner: Recruit
- Industry: Recruitment
- Products: Job search engine
- Website: www.workopolis.com
- Commercial: Yes
- Launched: 2000
- Current status: Operating as a white label

Workopolis was a Canadian website specializing in online job searching. Headquartered in Toronto, Workopolis had offices in eight Canadian cities including Montreal, Ottawa, Calgary and Vancouver and provided its services in both English and French. It was acquired by Indeed.com in June 2018 and subsequently shut down as an independent job board. It remains as a white label portal for Indeed's Canadian job postings.

== History ==
Formed initially by The Globe and Mail to host career postings, Workopolis gained its current name after Torstar partnered with the Globe and Mail in 2000. In 2002, Gesca became the third partner of the site. In October 2006 both Torstar and Gesca acquired the 40% stake of the company from the Globe and Mail, parting 50% stake of the site.

Workopolis was the supplier of Online Recruitment Services for the Vancouver 2010 Olympics and Paralympic Winter Games.

In 2013, Workopolis was described by CTV News as one of Canada's top jobs website.

Recruit Holdings, owners of Indeed purchased Workopolis in April 2018.

== See also ==
- Employment website
