= Rozee.pk =

Pakistani employment website

- Company type: Public
- Website type: Employment website
- Available in: English
- Founded: 2007; 19 years ago
- Headquarters: Gulberg, Lahore, Pakistan
- Founder: Monis Rahman
- Industry: Internet
- Services: Employment website
- Website: www.rozee.pk
- Commercial: Yes
- Registration: Required
- Current status: Active

Rozee.pk (Urdu: روزی; lit: "Livelihood") is a Pakistani employment website, a subsidiary of Naseeb Networks. It was founded in 2007 by Monis Rahman and has since become one of the most popular platforms for job seekers and employers in the country. Rozee.pk connects job seekers with employment opportunities across various industries, including IT, healthcare, finance, and engineering.

== History ==
In 2011, AllWorld Network listed the company as one of Pakistan's fastest growing private companies.

Rozee.pk bought Saudi employment website Mihnati.com for an undisclosed amount in 2013.

In 2016, the website went into complete reconstruction changing its interface, algorithms and logo.

== See also ==
- List of employment websites
