= Systems Limited =

Software company based in Lahore

- Trade name: SYS
- Type: Public
- Traded as: PSX: SYS; KSE 100 component KSE 30 component
- ISIN: PK0109001013
- Industry: Software
- Founded: 1977; 49 years ago
- Founder: Aezaz Hussain
- Headquarters: Lahore, Punjab, Pakistan
- Area served: Worldwide
- Key people: Aezaz Hussain (chairman); Asif Peer (CEO)
- Revenue: ▲ Rs. 53.44 billion (US$190 million) (2023)
- Net income: ▲ Rs. 8.69 billion (US$31 million) (2023)
- Total assets: ▲ Rs. 14.754 billion (US$53 million) (2022)
- Number of employees: 5,320 (2022)
- Subsidiaries: TechVista Systems; TechVista Qatar; Systems Arabia; NdcTech; Visionet
- Website: systemsltd.com

Systems Limited (SYS) is a Pakistani multinational information technology company that provides software development, digital transformation, cloud, data and artificial intelligence (AI), and business process outsourcing (BPO) services. It is headquartered in Lahore, Pakistan and is the largest IT company in Pakistan.

Its subsidiaries include Techvista Systems, Systems Arabia, Systems Misr, and Techvista Qatar, and NdcTech.

== History ==
=== 1977–2013: Early history ===
Systems Limited was established in 1977 in Lahore by Aezaz Hussain, and is generally regarded as the first software house to be incorporated in Pakistan.

In 1997, Systems Limited established its presence in the United States through the acquisition of New Jersey-based Visionet Systems, Inc., which Hussain led as chief executive officer until 2008. In 2005, the company was converted from a private limited to a public limited company.

=== 2013: Listing and growth ===
In 2013, Asif Peer, who had previously served as chief operating officer of Visionet Systems, was appointed CEO and managing director of Systems Limited. In the same year, the company expanded into the United Arab Emirates through its subsidiary TechVista Systems, based in Dubai. In 2014, following an initial public offering, it was listed on the Karachi Stock Exchange, Lahore Stock Exchange, and Islamabad Stock Exchange.

In 2020, Systems Limited was selected for the Forbes Asia's Best Under a Billion list. The company would go on to appear on the Forbes list for five consecutive years through 2024.

=== 2022 – Present ===
In May 2022, Systems acquired National Data Consultant Limited (NdcTech), a Lahore-based core and digital banking implementation provider and a partner of Temenos, along with its subsidiaries in the United Arab Emirates and Singapore. In August 2022, Systems Limited established a subsidiary in Johannesburg, South Africa, becoming the first Pakistani IT company in Africa. Also in 2022, the company expanded into Saudi Arabia through its subsidiary Systems Arabia, which it had established as a wholly foreign-owned entity in the country.

In July 2025, Systems acquired the Global Business Service, an IT support company registered under the name of British American Tobacco SAA Services (Private) Limited from British American Tobacco International Holdings Limited. The acquisition took place in conjunction with a partnership agreement between Systems' holding company Techvista Systems FZ LLC and Accenture to help deliver automation solutions to the multinational corporation.

In December 2025, Systems acquired Confiz, a Pakistan-headquartered IT services firm with operations in North America and Europe and specialisation in retail, consumer packaged goods, and AI-led data modernisation.

In the first quarter of 2026, Systems Limited reported a net profit of Rs3.03 billion, up 21% from the same period in 2025. Revenue from contracts with customers rose 32.62% year-on-year to Rs23.98 billion.

In August 2026, Systems Limited was included in the Forbes Asia Best Under A Billion list for the sixth time.

== See also ==
- List of largest companies in Pakistan
