= Companies Committed to Kids =

Canadian non-profit organization

- 2014-2017 logo
- Formerly: Concerned Children's Advertisers
- Founded: February 26, 1990; 36 years ago
- Founder: Sunni Boot; David Mintz
- Defunct: March 30, 2017; 9 years ago
- Fate: Dormancy And Decline In Business, Closed In The Aftermath
- Headquarters: Toronto, Ontario, Canada
- Area served: Canada
- Key people: Bev Deeth (CEO, President)
- Products: Public Service Announcements

The last logo for Concerned Children's Advertisers, before the name change.

The previous logo of CCA, which appeared in older PSAs

Companies Committed to Kids (French: Entreprises pour l'essor des enfants) (formerly known as Concerned Children's Advertisers) was a Canadian non-profit organization based in Toronto, founded in 1990 by former chief executive officer Sunni Boot and former president of the Global Television Network David Mintz as a contributive production-wide body dedicated to launching campaigns and expressing the significance of their public service announcements to target children between the ages of eight and 12. It produced over 30 announcements, covering topics such as drug abuse, conformity, self-esteem, and bullying. Each PSA ends with the logo of the organization. Usually, the commercials partnered up with Health Canada.

The organization and its campaigns are supported by various television networks, stations and specialty channels throughout the country, as well as one border station in the United States (KVOS-TV).

The members of the organization were private companies that market to children and families, including McDonald's, Disney, Mattel, PepsiCo, Coca-Cola, Teletoon, Hasbro, Corus Entertainment, Bell Canada, Cadbury Canada, Hershey's, Kellogg's, Kraft, Shaw Media, Loblaw, Nestle, General Mills, Weston, Canwest, CTV, Publicis, the Institute of Communication Agencies, Rogers Media, DHX Media, and others.

In 2014, the organization earned around $4 million from its associate media organizations and companies allowing it to extend the word across its main goal: bullying, mental health and self-esteem. Almost 25 years, the company estimates having earned $50 million for media donations, $5 million for qualifying corporation and one year and almost two months donated by the businesses minds of marketing.

On March 30, 2017, the company and organization closed due to a decline in business and dormancy, and is best known in fighting child abuse.

== Public service announcements ==
=== Substance abuse prevention ===
- Brain (1990): One of the first commercials produced by the organization, this commercial depicts a brain made up of a series of electrical wires. A female authoritative voice tells the viewers to think about what drugs can do to people's brains, dreams, and future. An unseen person holding a pair of wire cutters is cutting up the brain's wires, showing the effect of more drugs being consumed, before it eventually short-circuits. The commercial ends with the female voice saying: "Think about it—while you still can." Edited March 23, 1990. AGENCY: Cossette, Inc.
- Crack (1990): This brief commercial depicts a body bag on a stretcher. The same narrator from the Brain commercial tells viewers that in the past two years (1988 and 1989), over 5,000 people in Canada and the United States have died from using crack or cocaine. She ends the commercial saying, "Do yourself a favor... think about it". Edited March 23, 1990. AGENCY: Cossette, Inc.
- Cocaine (1990): This commercial was filmed from the perspective of someone lying on a hospital bed and being revived with a defibrillator. While this is happening, a female narrator speaks to the audience about the side effects of using cocaine. Edited April 6, 1990. AGENCY: Cossette, Inc.
- Be True to You (1990): In this commercial, the narrator is a teenage boy wearing a red and black shirt, and he is meeting with three of his friends. He talks about the perceptions of teenage drug use, and his message is very clear... he wants children to make healthy decisions and do what is right for them. One of the memorable lines of this commercial is "Just because we are young, doesn't mean we are stupid." AGENCY: Intergroup.
- Drug Rap (1990): In this commercial, a rap song about the choices of drugs is performed by a group of children and adults. They repeat the use of the line: "Drugs, drugs, drugs... Which are good, which are bad... Drugs, drugs, drugs... Ask your mom or ask your dad". AGENCY: McArthur, Thompson & Law.
- Syringe / No Label on Drugs (1990): This commercial takes place on the urban streets of Toronto at night. A rat is walking while a syringe is sucking up dirty water from a gutter. A man's voice says, "There's a lot of stories about the stuff that gets into street drugs." The hand holding the syringe pushes the plunger down, as if the contaminated water is being injected into someone. The empty syringe is tossed in the air and comes down shattering on to the concrete while the rat flees. Then the man's voice says, "So if you're afraid of what's been done to them, wait till you see what they do to you," as more filthy water runs down over the pieces of the syringe. AGENCY: FCB/Ronalds-Reynolds.
- Elevator (1990): A buck hoist is depicted as a metaphor for drug abuse and its devastating effects. Edited March 30, 1990. AGENCY: FCB/Ronalds-Reynolds.
- Interaction (1990): Life and the tough decisions it entails both take the form of a board game referred to by the male narrator as “The Game of Life.” The word ‘DRUGS’ (in red) is clearly printed onto the centre of the game board. Scattered all over it are miniature syringes, bags of narcotics, and small piles of what appears to be cocaine. A bespectacled teenaged boy is shown playing the game by himself as the narrator says, “In the real game of life, you’ll have to make real-life decisions—tough choices about the direction you’d like your future to take.” The boy picks up a pair of dice, tosses them onto the table, then moves his token several squares before stopping at a space labelled “Choice,” on which one of the mounds of cocaine is placed. The narrator then continues with “...How to deal with life’s ups and downs—temptation, pressure...” After a slight pause, the narrator says to the viewer, “The decision...is yours.” The boy overturns the entire game board, sending all the pieces flying. He is then seen raising his right fist into the air, grinning. The narrator ends the commercial with, “In the real game of life, you deserve the very best chance you could get.” AGENCY: FCB/Ronalds-Reynolds.
- Substance Abuse Testimonials (1990): This is a series of four commercials. The speakers of each commercial are Cynthia, Lisa, Doug, and Steve. Each of these people tell their side of the story of why they became drug addicts, and that the way they take drugs, they are hurting themselves and their families. AGENCY: Saatchi & Saatchi.
- Mimic (1990): A little girl pretends to drink coffee and smoke cigarettes (using various items for play). A female voice says, "Kids, they're so cute and whenever learning new things they're real copycats," while black and white flashbacks portray a group of adults having a party, smoking and sharing cigarettes and drinking alcohol which is shown throughout the commercial. The girl pretends to smoke a cigarette and shares it with her teddy bear. The girl is then shown pretending to be in a euphoric state after a drink of coffee which shows that she's acting like she's high and drunk. This shows that children can copy what their parents do, even doing things that are inappropriate such as smoking and drinking. A male voice ends the commercial saying, "Someones watching your every action, be aware, be wise." Edited May 25, 1990. AGENCY: Highwood Communications Ltd.
- Coming Down (1991): Two lovers, a young man (played by Joe Roncetti) and woman (played by Liisa Repo-Martell), are depicted using drugs together, which ultimately culminates in the man's death. AGENCY: FCB/Ronalds-Reynolds.
- Rehab (1992): This commercial is a story about a young man (played by Graeme Millington) recalling his life of using drugs and his childhood days with a close male friend. He is initially seen sitting inside his room in a rehab facility watching a clear view from outside. The music in the background is an old song performed by The Hollies, "He Ain't Heavy, He's My Brother". He walks out of his room and spots his friend (played by Matthew Wylie) visiting the facility before embracing each other. The commercial ends with a voice-over saying: "If you try to stop a friend from using drugs, you may not succeed, but at least you tried—and that's what friends are for". Edited March 1, 1992. AGENCY: FCB Canada Ltd.
- Hip Choice (1993): This commercial begins with a text message that says "Ever Thought About Taking Drugs?". It then shows two children standing (they are latex puppets, not real people) encountering a drug pusher wearing shades in an alleyway. The drug pusher sticks out his hands showing them the drugs and tells them that they have a choice of whether they will take them or not. A flash-sequence of disturbing images of drug addicts and celebrities that died from drugs appears when the pusher sticks out his hands. The children eventually ignore the offer and walk away from the drug pusher. The drug pusher then takes off his shades, revealing his hideous yellow eyes. Edited April 13, 1993. There are two variants of this PSA with different endings:

1. The drug pusher takes his shades off to reveal his hideous, yellow eyes. An early variant zooms in on his eyes.
2. The drug pusher does not remove his shades and goes completely quiet. This version is less scary than the first and was used after many parents complaining about the first version being too disturbing and frightening for children.

AGENCY: YTV Canada, Inc.

- Loser (1995): This commercial takes place in an old car resembling a 1969 Ford Mustang, with four teenagers smoking pot. The commercial focuses on one of the teenagers in the car, implacably a "cool" kid, and another one (not in the car), whom they consider a "loser". The "cool" kid recalls past activities he once enjoyed before his addiction, such as sports, while joking around with his friends, and chides the "loser" for being into different stuff. The "cool" kid then says he and his friends like to party and that guys like the "loser" didn't know how to party. A message pops up, reading "Can you spot the losers?" The narrator then says "Truth is, there's a million things to do that are more fun than sitting around getting stoned." The commercial ends with the message, "Think about it." Edited February 14, 1995. AGENCY: Leo Burnett Company Ltd.
- Transactions (1995): A guitarist, presumably a street musician, is standing on a Toronto street interacting with the camera, offering the viewer several choices; you can feed your pet hamster when you're supposed to or he'll die, you can eat a ton of fries or look good in pants, and finally, "you can do drugs or you can do everything else." Edited September 22, 1995. AGENCY: Vickers and Benson Advertising Ltd.

=== Child safety ===
- Storytime (1991): A woman reads a story about a family of raccoons. In the story, a baby raccoon finds various foods that are said to be unsafe for raccoons (this is to show that some things are unsafe for children). The baby raccoon eventually finds an apple that is safe for him to eat. Edited Mar. 24, 1991. AGENCY: Palmer Jarvis DDB.
- Labyrinth (1991): A group of children find a discarded syringe and talk about what to do with it. The commercial ends with the message, "Remember, if you find a needle tell somebody." Filmed at Keefer St, Vancouver, BC. Edited Feb. 14 1991. AGENCY: Cactus Productions Inc.
- Don't You Put It in Your Mouth (1992): This well-known commercial makes the use of song and puppetry, depicting two scary-looking blue creatures singing a song about the dangers of putting strange objects into one's mouth. A lion ends the commercial saying "Always ask someone you love before you put anything in your mouth." Edited January 12, 1992. There are two variants of this commercial with different endings:

1. The lion ends the commercial saying "Always ask someone you love before you put anything in your mouth."
2. The lion gives a brief explanation about why you shouldn't put things in your mouth when you don't know what they are.
AGENCY: Cactus Productions Inc.

- The Trap (1993): Two mice come across a mouse trap with a piece of cheese on it. One mouse convinces the other to avoid it, and to ask for help if they don't know what something is. One of the mouse puppets from this PSA was used in The Big Comfy Couch. Edited July 16, 1993. AGENCY: Radical Sheep Productions Inc.

=== Child abuse prevention ===
- How Was Your Day? (1995): A teacher tells her child about a student who gets abused. She explains to her child that the student thinks his mother is always mad at him. The student's mother hits him, yells, and breaks things. She tells him that he did the right thing by telling her. The commercial ends with a message saying "Tell someone you trust when something is wrong. They want to help." Edited January 30, 1995. AGENCY: Leo Burnett Company Ltd.

=== Smart choices ===
- Choose (1995): The commercial introduces many children suggesting that you can choose what you want in life and nobody makes your decisions. Edited December 26, 1995. AGENCY: MacLaren McCann Inc.
- Moe Funky (1996): A stylized look at the games of youth that carries the message: don't play games when making the important decisions in life—use your head instead. There is a computerized robotic voice saying "1 potato, 2 potato, 3 potato, 4. 5 potato, 6 potato, 7 potato, more". Edited March 10, 1996. AGENCY: J. Walter Thompson Company Ltd.

=== Media literacy ===
- Smart as You (1997): In this PSA aimed at children, an anthropomorphic television talks about programs children can see on TV, and that they are smarter than it (meaning that children make the choices about what they can do). Some footage from an old YTV programming block, ReBoot, Uh Oh!, Really Wild Animals, Flash Gordon and It's Alive! are shown. Edited October 4, 1997. AGENCY: FCB Canada Ltd.
- House Hippo (1999): In this documentary-style PSA, it begins introducing viewers to a typical kitchen during the night, eventually introducing the "House hippo", a small hippo-like creature who is apparently infesting the house. They begin adding bits of information gradually until the end, where an image of a real hippo and her young appear on a TV. A female narrator now admits that the house hippo wasn't real and that media literacy is important, as well as asking questions. Edited May 1, 1999. AGENCY: Publicis.

=== Self-esteem ===
- We Are Girls (1997): Shows various female preteens and teenagers expressing what they will and will not do. The commercial ends with the message, "We are girls. We will do what is right for us." Edited March 2, 1997. AGENCY: Vickers and Benson Advertising Ltd.
- Boutique (1998): After seeing an attractive girl leaving a store, two young girls enter the boutique, hoping to look like the girl. Once inside, they realize that this boutique's purpose is to change people. The girls experience various stages that should change them, such as the application of makeup, plastic surgery, and the "Personality Changing Room". Throughout the commercial, a Big Brother-esque woman speaks on a screen, saying "Why be you, when you can be me?" The girls decide to leave the store as themselves. Edited February 6, 1998. AGENCY: Palmer Jarvis DDB.
- What's Your Thing? (1999): A commercial showing various children and teenagers' favourite things, such as tap dancing, magic tricks and making sound effects. It ends with the message "Nobody's good at everything; but everybody's good at something." Edited May 12, 1999. AGENCY: Ogilvy and Mather Advertising.
- Bundle Up (2000): A group of boys are seen walking on a sidewalk. A mother of one of the boys drive up to them, get out of the car and put a jacket on her son. It ends with the message "Boy, it's not easy being one". Edited July 25, 2000. AGENCY: Ammirati Puris Lintas.
- Knock on Wood (2000): This commercial depicts a few teen guys trying to convince a younger boy to play Ding Dong Ditch. The younger boy walks up to the door, but the outcome is never shown. It ends with the message "Boy, it's not easy being one". Edited September 19, 2000. AGENCY: Ammirati Puris Lintas.
- Mental Wellness (2012): It shows a man and a woman in a kitchen with their daughter sitting at a table. The woman reminds her husband that they will be seeing her parents, the husband declines due to work and the two begin to argue, with the wife pointing out their daughter is in the room and not to fight in front of her. The husband immediately leaves the room in frustration. As the argument goes on, the camera pans to show the girl is in a classroom with the kitchen behind her. A female narrator then tells the viewer that 1 in 5 kids under 11 have mental wellness issues. AGENCY: Viacom International (now Paramount Global).

=== "Stay Fit, 'Cause You Never Know" ===
Filmed on Banmoor Boulevard in Toronto, Ontario.

- Ice Scream (2001): Four kids are shown having a conversation while sitting on the grass close to the front yard of their house. They notice an ice cream truck passing by their house and the kids try to chase after it, but they eventually give up and become exhausted while the ice cream truck is still driving down their street. Edited January 6, 2001. AGENCY: Cossette, Inc.
- The Chase (2001): A boy runs away from three girls. He starts to feel very tired, the girls eventually get caught up with him and they make the boy feel uncomfortable by kissing him. The song playing in the background is "Lungo Filaccio" by Roberto Cardinali. Edited March 6, 2001. AGENCY: Cossette, Inc.
- Blown Away (2001): A boy is shown looking at his new Pokémon cards that he just purchased from a convenience store, but his Charizard Pokémon card gets blown away by the wind and he tries to chase after it. He attempts to get his card back but he eventually gives up, runs out of breath and his new Pokémon card vanishes. The music was later used in the 2004 film The SpongeBob SquarePants Movie. The PSA is filmed at Elm St and King St in Weston. Edited August 28, 2001. AGENCY: Cossette, Inc.

=== Bullying ===
- Walk Away (2002): A bully is shown seemingly harassing another child in a schoolyard. As the camera pans out, it is revealed that the bully is actually alone, his target and any potential onlookers having left. Edited May 21, 2002. Created by Publicis.
- Words Hurt (2003): A girl is taunted by bullies in a school hallway. The bullies' insults manifest as physical words that attack the girl, prompting her to flee. Filmed at Lawrence Park Collegiate Institute in Toronto. Edited June 13, 2003. Created by Publicis.
- Tell Someone (2005): A boy wakes up and is plagued by a vision of his school bully. Eventually, the boy confides in his mother about the bullying, causing the vision to disappear. Edited June 30, 2005. Created by Round Table Advertising.

=== Healthy active living (Long Live Kids) ===
Part of the Long Live Kids campaign, created in conjunction with the Knowledge network in British Columbia. The "Body" ad was not used on Knowledge Network, only Discovery Kids (Canada) and BBC Kids, this was the very first PSA that was released a year after.

- Health Rock (2004): A lively 60 second animation featuring someone's T-shirt with a blue creature on it which turns animated. It has an entertaining commercial jingle that explains the importance of balancing food and activity and encourages kids to "eat smart and move more." Edited October 3, 2004. Created by J. Walter Thompson.
- Head (2006): A boy (Lamar Johnson) removes his head and it bounces over to the fridge. He goes over, picks up his head, opens the fridge, and grabs a plastic container with his mouth. It ends with a text message saying "Choose a variety of foods". Edited February 10, 2006. Created by Round Table Advertising.
- Body (2006): The same boy takes his head off and sets it on his desktop, and his body dances to hip-hop music. It ends with a text message saying "Move your body at least 30 extra minutes each day". Edited February 10, 2006. Created by Round Table Advertising.
- Media Monkey (2010): A girl is first shown reading a magazine with pages torn out by a monkey in a sailor suit. The monkey unplugs the girl's computer after it shows a weight loss pop-up, and they fight over the TV. This PSA ends with the message "You don't need a Media Monkey to make healthy choices. Think for yourself", as the girl sees the monkey covering up a perfume advertisement. Edited February 4, 2010. Created by Bensimon Byrne.

== See also ==
- House hippo
