= Glassdoor =

American website about employers and employment

Glassdoor LLC
- Company type: Subsidiary
- Website type: Job search engine, review site
- Available in: Multilingual
- Founded: June 2007; 19 years ago
- Headquarters: Indeed Tower; 200 West 6th Street; Floor 36; Austin, TX 78701
- Founders: Robert Hohman; Rich Barton; Tim Besse
- Key people: Hisayuki "Deko" Idekoba (President and Chief Executive Officer of Indeed); Owen Humphries (President of Glassdoor)
- Industry: Internet
- Services: Online employment
- Parent: Recruit Holdings
- Website: glassdoor.com
- Commercial: Yes
- Registration: Required
- Current status: Active

Glassdoor is an American website and mobile app owned by Indeed featuring ratings and reviews of companies by current and former employees. In 2018, the company was acquired by the Japanese company Recruit Holdings (owner of Indeed) for US$1.2 billion. Glassdoor legally merged into Indeed, Inc. on July 1, 2026 and ceased operating as an independent subsidiary.

== Founding ==
The company was co-founded in 2007 by Tim Besse, Robert Hohman, and Expedia founder Rich Barton, who served as the company's chairman. The idea came from a brainstorming session between Barton and Hohman when Barton relayed the story of accidentally leaving the results of an employee survey on the printer while working at Expedia. The two hypothesized that if the results had been revealed publicly, it could have been a service to those looking to make career decisions. The company's headquarters were established in Mill Valley, California.

== Website ==
Glassdoor launched its company ratings site in June 2008, as a site that "collects company reviews and real salaries from employees of large companies and displays them anonymously for all members to see", according to TechCrunch. The company then averaged the reported salaries, posting these averages alongside the reviews employees made of the management and culture of the companies they worked for – including some of the larger tech companies like Google and Yahoo. The site also allows the posting of office photographs and other media. Each year Glassdoor ranks overall company ratings to determine its annual Employees’ Choice Awards, also known as the Best Places to Work Awards.

The site later also began focusing on CEOs and workplaces and what it is like to work at jobs in general. Employee reviews are averaged for each company. The company has stated that it rejects about 20% of entries after screening. Rules for posting reviews are different for smaller companies than they are for larger companies in order to preserve the anonymity of people in close departments.

In 2010, Glassdoor released a fee-based program called "Enhanced Employer Profiles", which allows employers to include their own content on Glassdoor profiles, like executive biographies, classifieds, social media links, and referrals. The company also allows users to post potential job interview questions that might be asked by certain companies, acquired by interviewed job candidates, in addition to other information that can be used to prepare job applications. The reputation a company has on Glassdoor has also been found correlative by Case Western Professor Casey Newmeyer. Business Journal has recommended that CEOs review Glassdoor reviews to "telegraph organizational issues".

In 2017, Glassdoor announced on its website that it would no longer post job advertisements that exclude people with criminal records. The business magazine Entrepreneur praised the move.

Following the rise of the COVID-19 pandemic, the employees worked fully remote starting on March 3, 2020. In May 2020, Glassdoor announced it was laying off 300 people, accounting for 30% of the company's workforce and half of the Chicago office. Another layoff was announced of approximately 140 people, or 15% of the company's workforce in March 2023. The final remaining offices at Chicago and San Francisco closed in 2024.

Before July 2023, users only required an email address to sign up and leave a review. Following the integration of the work discussion app Fishbowl, new and old users are now required to input their full name, workplace, and job title, though those details could be hidden. It is impossible to delete names from accounts, nor can they be changed without contacting support.

The 2024 policy change generated privacy concerns because anonymity had historically been a central feature of Glassdoor. Some users reported that their real names or other identifying information had been added to their profiles without their consent. One user told Wired that after requesting that her name be removed, she was told that deleting her account was the only option. Glassdoor said that reviews and ratings would remain anonymous and that identifying information was used for verification, although its terms of use stated that the company could not guarantee users' anonymity.

== Review reliability ==
The reliability of employer ratings on Glassdoor has been the subject of academic research. A 2026 study published in the Review of Accounting Studies, examining reviews of U.S. public companies from 2011 to 2022, found evidence that employers can influence the workplace information presented on the platform. The researchers found that as competition for workers increased, positive reviews became less reflective of actual workplace conditions, with increases in positive reviews occurring without corresponding improvements in workplace conditions. The study also discussed documented instances of employers encouraging favorable reviews and the existence of reputation-management services offering to place positive Glassdoor reviews.

== Reports ==
Glassdoor produces reports based upon the data collected from its users, on topics including work–life balance, CEO pay-ratios, lists of the best office places and cultures, and the accuracy of corporate job searching maxims. Glassdoor also puts the conclusions of its research of other companies towards its company policies. In 2015, Tom Lakin produced the first study of Glassdoor in the United Kingdom, concluding that Glassdoor is regarded by users as a more trustworthy source of information than career guides or official company documents.

== Acquisitions and leadership ==
In May 2018, Recruit Holdings announced its intention to acquire Glassdoor for $1.2 billion in cash, with the acquisition completed in June 2018.

In September 2016, Glassdoor acquired Brazil's Love Mondays, expanding to Latin America.

In 2014, the company hired Adam Spiegel as its CFO, with the intention of preparing for an eventual IPO. By 2015, the site had 30 million users from 190 countries and corporate clients including one-third of all Fortune 500 companies. That year, Glassdoor also began creating localized websites and mobile apps for different national jurisdictions, such as Germany.

In February 2019, Glassdoor announced that COO Christian Sutherland-Wong would be promoted to President & COO.

In 2021, Glassdoor acquired work-related social app Fishbowl.

Glassdoor legally merged into Indeed, Inc. on July 1, 2026 and ceased operating as an independent subsidiary.

== Investments ==
The company received its first financing in 2008, receiving $3 million in funding, before launching its website. In 2012 Glassdoor received $20 million of venture capital, taking its total outside funding to $42.2 million. The following year, the company raised an additional $50 million. In 2015, the company raised an additional $70 million, in an investment round led by Google Capital, giving the company a valuation of just short of $1 billion. The total of investment at this point was $160 million. In 2016 Glassdoor raised an additional $40 million from investors.

== Anonymity ==
In November 2017, the U.S. Court of Appeals required disclosing Glassdoor's anonymous users' identities to prosecutors investigating possible criminal misconduct by their employers. Investigators sought to speak with reviewers who might have seen crimes committed. The court's decision did not require sharing reviewers' identities with employers.

In June 2022, Glassdoor lost a defamation lawsuit, forcing it to unmask the identity of users of the Glassdoor website who anonymously left negative reviews about their former employer. The ruling was regarding Zuru, a New Zealand company.

Following a policy change in 2024 which required all users to verify their identity, real names and other personal information were automatically added to user profiles. Per Glassdoor's terms of service, the data is sourced from third parties and other sister services. While users could still leave anonymous reviews, news site Ars Technica claimed this made the service vulnerable to data leaks in cases of data breaches and subpoenas.
