= Canadian Job Bank =

Employment website

Job Bank
- Headquarters: Gatineau, {{{location_country}}}
- Industry: Recruitment
- Products: Job search engine
- Website: www.jobbank.gc.ca

The Job Bank is an employment website operated by Employment and Social Development Canada. It provides an online database of job listings in Canada, as well as other employment services and information for recruiters and job seekers, including career planning, resume creation, job matching, and notifications. There is also a mobile app that can be downloaded for free on the Apple App Store and the Google Play store.

Provinces under Labour Market Development Agreements with the federal government must contribute their listings to the Job Bank.

In 2018, Saskatchewan announced that it would discontinue its own provincial job search engine, SaskJobs, on May 1, 2018 in favor of the Job Bank, to provide "enhanced" services for its users. This came after the Brad Wall government made cuts to employment and work readiness programs in the 2017-18 provincial budget. Users criticized the Job Bank's design and functionality, and lamented the lack of features such as finer geographical regions and unrestricted options for job titles over SaskJobs, and the account system requiring finer personal information (including a social insurance number). In May 2018, the province chose to delay the full shutdown of SaskJobs for six additional months. The following year, SaskJobs was given $430,000 in funding in the 2019-20 provincial budget, with minister of immigration and career training Jeremy Harrison stating that maintaining SaskJobs alongside the Job Bank would provide residents "with the right balance in functionality and service to grow their careers and to grow our economy".

== Employers ==
An employer can post a job on the Canadian Job Bank, obtain information about hiring international workers and various human resources issues, learn about permit and licensing matters, and obtain information about various incentive programmes.

== Employees ==
Anyone can find general information about how to look for a job, how occupations are described in Canada, how to make a successful attempt to obtain a job, alternatives to employment, employment and work standards, requirements for working in Canada, and advice for specific categories of people.

== Career exploration ==
A visitor can explore careers by occupation, wages and outlook, education programme, or skills and knowledge. If the visitor searches by occupation then the site provides a list of jobs from the Canadian Job Bank accompanied by median income for the geographical region, where available, and other information. The wages and outlooks option lists one of these kinds of information for either an occupation or a location. If the visitor selects education programme then the site will attempt to identify a programme based on key words input by the visitor. In the case of skills and knowledge the site displays how well the visitor's pattern of responses matches those of a variety of occupations.
