= Simply Hired =

Employment website

- Available in: Chinese, Dutch, English, French, German, Italian, Japanese, Korean, Portuguese, Spanish, Swedish, Russian
- Founded: 2003
- Headquarters: Sunnyvale, California, US
- Owner: Recruit
- Services: Employment website
- Website: www.SimplyHired.com
- Commercial: Yes
- Launched: 2023
- Current status: Yes

Simply Hired is an employment website for an online recruitment advertising network based in Sunnyvale, California. The company was launched in 2003. In 2016, Recruit Holdings Co., Ltd. purchased Simply Hired.

The company aggregates job listings from thousands of websites and job boards. It then advertises those jobs on its website and mobile app. Employers can gain premium placement in the listings by advertising in a pay-per-click (PPC) model.

== Investment history ==
Investors sank a total of US$33.1 million into Simply Hired between 2005 and 2014:

- 2005: $3 million in Series-C funding from Guy Kawasaki, Dave McClure, Ron Conway, Garage Technology Ventures, and others.
- 2006: $13.5 million in series-C funding from News Corp.'s Fox Interactive Media division and Foundation Capital.
- 2009: $4.6 million in Series-D funding from IDG Ventures and Foundation Capital.
- 2014: $12M Series-E funding from City National Bank, IDG Ventures, and Foundation Capital.

== Services ==
Services for job seekers include job search, resume upload, custom profiles, email alerts, a company directory, trending companies from its Employer Brand Index, job search advice, and local information in the United States.

== Awards and recognition ==
- Simply Hired won an award for Excellence in Technology in 2014 by Brandon Hall in the Best Advance in Talent Acquisition Technology category.
- In 2013, Simply Hired was ranked #3 on Forbes’ "Top 10 Best Websites for Your Career" list.
- Simply Hired was awarded as one of PC Mag's Best Job Search Websites in 2013 and 2014.
- Simply Hired was ranked No. 6 on Forbes list of 35 Most Influential Career Sites for 2014.
- Youtern selected the Simply Hired blog for its "Top 50 Blogs for Young Careerists: 2014" list.

== See also ==
- Employment website
