= Asif Peer =

Pakistani businessperson

- آصف پیر
- Citizenship: Pakistani
- Education: National University of Computer and Emerging Sciences; Institute of Business Administration, Karachi
- Organization: Systems Ltd
- Known for: CEO & MD of Systems Ltd
- Awards: Sitara-i-Imtiaz in 2022

Asif Peer is the CEO and managing director of Pakistani software company Systems Ltd since 1 January 2013.

== Early life and education ==
Peer completed his bachelor's degree majored in Computer Science from National University of Computer and Emerging Sciences, Karachi in 1995, and MBA Finance and Marketing from Institute of Business Administration, Karachi in 1999.

== Career ==
Peer served as the Chief Operating Officer (COO) of Visionet Systems, Inc. from 2008 to 2012 in US. Peer was appointed as chief executive officer (CEO) of Systems Ltd on 1 January 2013. Under his leadership, the company has won several accolades, including Microsoft Country Partner of the Year, Top IT exporter 2019 award by PSEB IT Export Awards.

== Awards ==
Peer was awarded with Sitara-i-Imtiaz on 14 August 2022 for "19 years contribution to IT Sector of Pakistan".
