= Recruit (company) =

Japanese human resources company

Recruit Holdings Co., Ltd.

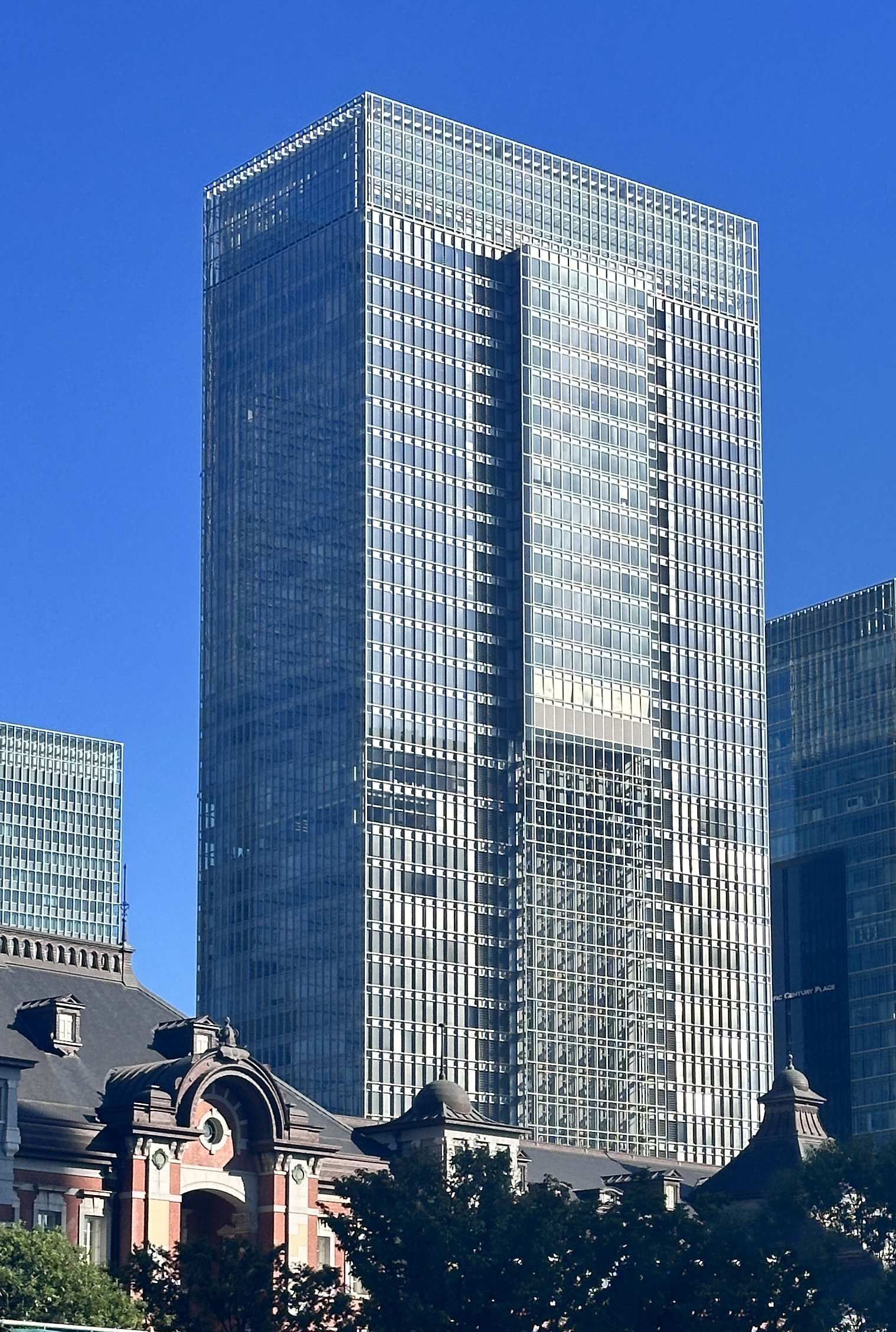
- Headquarters at GranTokyo in Marunouchi, Chiyoda, Tokyo
- Formerly: University Advertising Co., Ltd. (1960-1963); Japan Recruit Center Co., Ltd. (1963-1984); Recruit Co., Ltd. (1984-2012)
- Type: Public (K.K.) (Holding company)
- Traded as: TYO: 6098
- Industry: Professional services
- Founded: 1960; 66 years ago
- Headquarters: Tokyo, Japan
- Key people: Hisayuki Idekoba, Representative Director, President and Chief Executive Officer
- Revenue: ▲¥3,557.4 billion (FY 2024)
- Operating income: ▲¥490.5 billion (FY 2024)
- Number of employees: 116 (holding company); 49,480 (group) (as of March 31, 2025)
- Subsidiaries: Indeed; Glassdoor; Recruit Co., Ltd.; RGF Staffing B.V.
- Website: recruit-holdings.com/en/

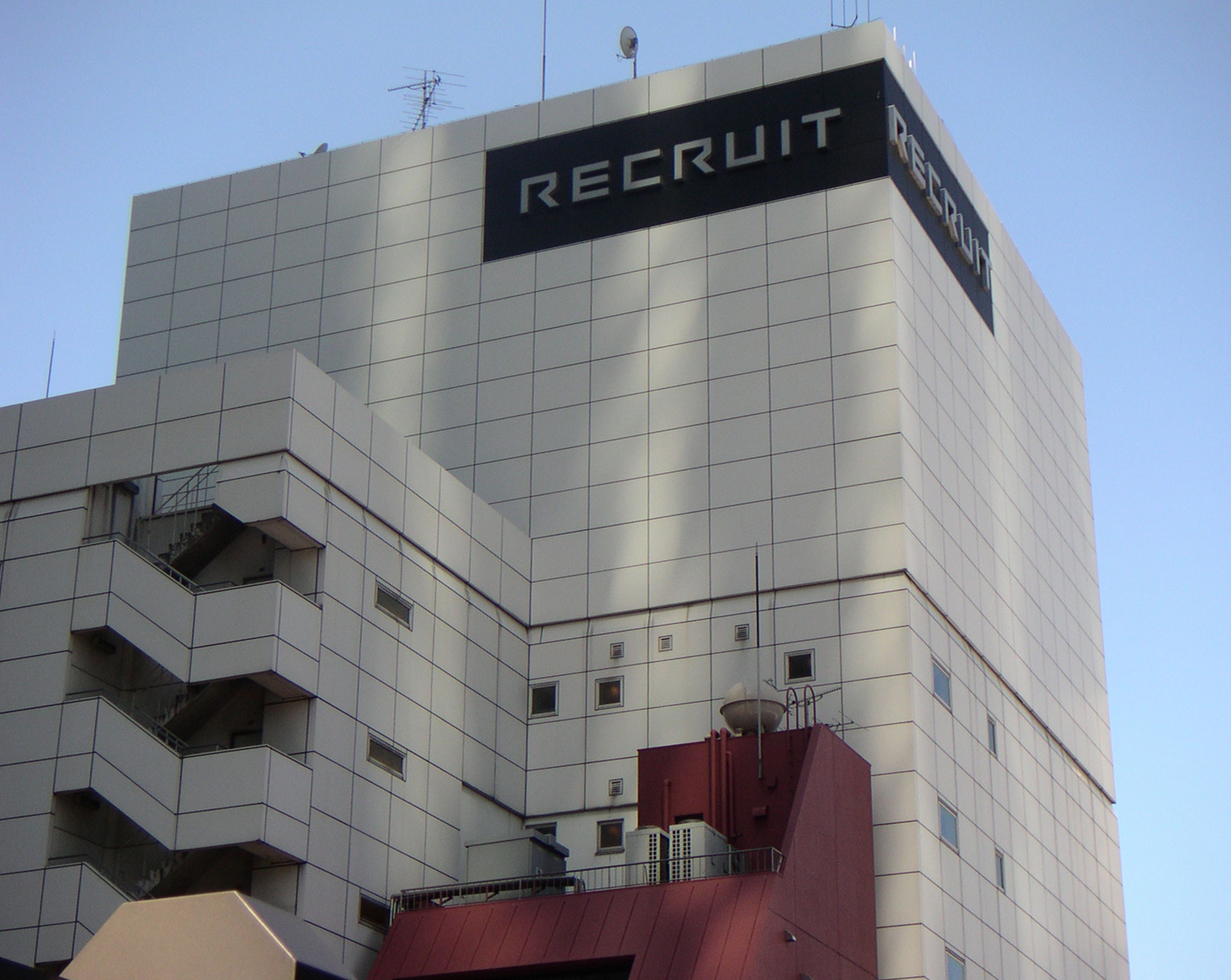
Recruit Higashi Shinbashi building

Recruit Holdings Co., Ltd. (株式会社リクルートホールディングス, Kabushikigaisha Rikurūto Hōrudingusu) is an HR Tech (human resources technology) holding company headquartered in Tokyo, Japan.

Recruit Group, currently consisting of three autonomous Strategic Business Units (SBUs) and Recruit Holdings, was founded in 1960 by Hiromasa Ezoe, then an educational psychology student at the University of Tokyo, as Daigaku Shimbun Koukokusha (大学新聞広告社, University Newspaper Advertisement Company). It was a spin-off from the Todai Shimbun (the University of Tokyo's main student newspaper).

In FY 2024, it reported sales of 3.56 trillion Yen and revenue of 678.8 billion Yen, with more than half of its sales generated overseas. Its flagship world-wide services include the job search engine Indeed and the employer review site Glassdoor. The company is listed on the Tokyo Stock Exchange and is a component of the Nikkei 225 and TOPIX Core 30 indices. As of January 2025, the company has the 4th largest market capitalisation in the country of 17.5trillion Yen.

== Overview ==
Recruit Holdings Co., Ltd. offers a two-sided talent marketplace that drives meaningful connections between job seekers and employers. In Japan, it also focuses on streamlining business essentials from sourcing to marketing through its cloud-based smart solutions including matching platforms and SaaS.

It holds business competitions within the company that all employees can participate in, fostering a corporate culture that encourages freely initiating new ventures. Popular terms such as "freeter (フリーター, freelancing part-timers)", "employment ice age (就職氷河期)", and "gaten-kei (ガテン系, meaning blue-collar jobs)" have originated from information magazines it has published.

Following the Recruit scandal in 1988, which was regarded as one of the largest post-war scandals in Japan, the company faced a loss of credibility, adversity worsened further by the collapse of the Japanese asset price bubble and subsequent Lost Decades. This led to the manifestation of bad assets issues with subsidiaries such as Recruit Cosmos (real estate) and First Finance (financial services). The entire group found itself in a difficult situation. In June 1992, its shares were transferred to the major supermarket chain Daiei, placing it under the Daiei Group. However, due to deteriorating performance within the Daiei Group, Recruit Holdings separated around the year 2000. At the time when it joined the Daiei Group, Daiei adopted a stance of being a "silent shareholder" without assuming any debts. Consequently, under Kunio Takagi from Daiei, Recruit managed to settle approximately 1.4 trillion yen in interest-bearing debt from the bubble era's real estate and non-bank business failures by the fiscal year ending in March 1994 by itself. Currently, Recruit operates independently of any corporate group, maintaining neutrality while expanding its business operations.

== Major Brands ==
HR Technology

- Indeed: The #1 job site in the world with over 580 million job seeker profiles. Job seekers can search millions of jobs in more than 60 countries and 28 languages.
- Glassdoor: A leader in workplace transparency. On Glassdoor, professionals can research ratings, reviews, salaries and more at millions of employers, and join communities to engage in candid workplace conversations.
- Rikunabi: Online matching platform for new graduates
- Rikunabi NEXT: Online matching platform for mid-career job seekers
- RECRUIT AGENT: Employment placement service for professionals
- RECRUIT DIRECT SCOUT: Talent sourcing service for professionals
- TOWNWORK: Online matching platform and print media for part-time and full-time job seekers

Staffing

- RGF Staffing: a staffing group providing a diverse range of HR services in Australia, Europe, Japan and the USA.
- Recruit Staffing: A temporary staffing solutions company focused on large companies in urban areas in Japan, offering support across all occupations and needs.
- STAFF SERVICE: A Japan-based staffing service company, providing comprehensive temporary staffing and placement solutions for clerical, engineering, IT engineering, medical, manufacturing and light industry, and various other professional positions.
- Unique: An agency providing a diverse range of HR services in Belgium.
- Staffmark: An agency providing staffing services in the U.S., focused mainly on light industrial jobs.
- CSI Companies: A staffing company placing highly qualified talent across a number of industries in the U.S. through its four divisions: CSI Financial, CSI Healthcare IT, CSI Professional, and CSI Tech.
- Chandler Macleod: A staffing company providing a diverse range of HR and outsourcing services predominantly in Australia and across the APAC region.

Marketing Matching Technologies

- SUUMO: Online platform, print media, and in-person consultation service for housing and real estate
- Hot Pepper Beauty: Online platform and print media for beauty treatment
- Jalan: Online platform and print media for travel in Japan
- Hot Pepper Gourmet: Online platform and print media for dining
- Air BusinessTools: Cloud-based operational and management support solutions for business clients across an expanding variety of businesses

== History ==
- 2010/7 – The company acquired US-based The CSI Companies
- 2011/10 – The company acquired US-based Staffmark for US$295 million.
- 2011/12 – The company acquired Advantage Resourcing Europe (currently RGF Staffing UK)
- 2012/10 – The company acquired US-based Indeed.
- 2014/10 – The company listed on the Tokyo Stock Exchange.
- 2015/1 – Recruit Holdings acquired People Bank Australia
- 2015/4 – Recruit Holdings acquired Chandler Macleod Group
- 2015 – Recruit Holdings acquired Treatwell for €180 million.
- 2015 – Recruit Holdings acquired Quandoo for US$219 million.
- 2016/6 – Recruit Holdings acquired USG People (currently RGF Staffing) for €1.42 billion.
- 2016 – Recruit Holdings acquired Simply Hired, a competitor of Indeed.
- 2018/3 – Recruit Holdings Co., Ltd. acquires the Canadian job search website Workopolis.
- 2018/6 – Recruit Holdings acquired Glassdoor for US$1.2 billion in cash.
- 2020/7 – Recruit Holdings Co., Ltd. Relinquishes its stakeholding in Treatwell
