= Luba Group =

Dutch employment agency company

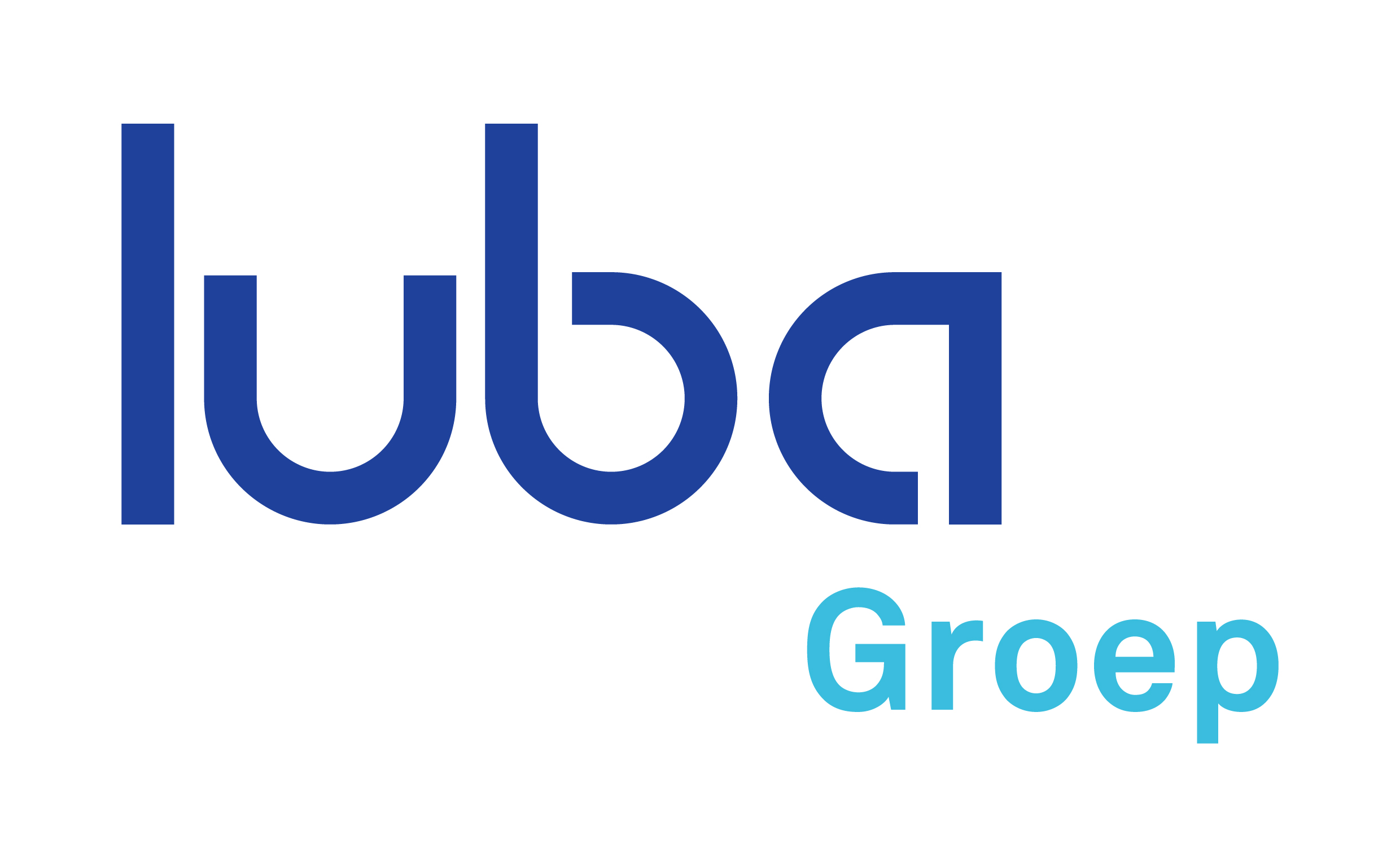
- Company type: Private
- Industry: staffing
- Founded: 1968
- Headquarters: Leiden, the Netherlands
- Revenue: ▲€ 101.6 million (2008)
- Net income: ▲€ 2.8 million (2008)
- Website: luba.nl

Luba Groep B.V. is a Dutch staffing company ("uitzendbureau"), based in Leiden, the Netherlands. It has operations in the Netherlands, Belgium and Poland.

== Overview ==
Founded in 1968 in Leiden, it was among the first staffing companies in the Netherlands. Luba initially specialised in temporary work for students. Later, its activities broadened to matching and recruiting mainly for Small and Medium-sized Businesses in the regional labour markets.

The company now operates around 50 outlets in The Netherlands and a handful of outlets in Belgium and Poland. In 2008, the shares were purchased by the Belgian staffing company t-Groep.

== Recognition ==
Luba's former CEO, Mariëtte Barnhoorn (2002–2009), was awarded Veuve Cliquot Business Woman of the Year in the Netherlands in 2004.
