= Employment website =

Website that deals specifically with employment or careers

An employment website is a website that deals specifically with employment or careers. Many employment websites are designed to allow employers to post job requirements for a position to be filled and are commonly known as job boards. Other employment sites offer employer reviews, career and job-search advice, and information about job roles and employers. Through a job website, a prospective employee can locate and fill out a job application or submit résumés over the internet for advertised positions.

== History ==
The Online Career Center was developed in 1992 by Bill Warren as a non-profit organization backed by forty major corporations, to allow job hunters to post their résumés and for recruiters to post job openings.

In 1994, Robert J. McGovern began NetStart Inc. as software sold to companies for listing job openings on their websites and managing the incoming e-mails generated by those listings. After an influx of $2 million in investment capital, he then transported this software to its own web address, at first listing the job openings from the companies who utilized the software. NetStart Inc. changed its name in 1998 to operate under the name of their software, CareerBuilder. The company received a further influx of $7 million from investment firms such as New Enterprise Associates to expand their operations.

Six major newspapers joined forces in 1995 to list their classified sections online. The service was called CareerPath.com and featured help-wanted listings from the Los Angeles Times, the Boston Globe, the Chicago Tribune, the New York Times, the San Jose Mercury News and the Washington Post.

The industry attempted to reach a broader, less tech-savvy base in 1998 when Hotjobs.com attempted to buy a Super Bowl spot, but Fox rejected the advertisement for being in poor taste. The ad featured a janitor at a zoo sweeping out the elephant cage completely unbeknownst to the animal. The elephant sits down briefly and when it stands back up, the janitor has disappeared, suggesting the worker was now stuck in the elephant's anus. The ad meant to illustrate a need for those stuck in jobs they hate, and offer a solution through their website.

In 1999, Monster.com ran on three 30-second Super Bowl ads for $4 million. One ad that featured children speaking like adults, drolly intoning their dream of working at various dead-end jobs to humorous effect, was far more popular than rival Hotjobs.com ad about a security guard who transitions from a low-paying security job to the same job at a fancier building. Soon thereafter, Monster.com was elevated to the top spot of online employment sites. Hotjobs.com's ad was not as successful, but it gave the company enough of a boost for its IPO in August.

After being purchased in a joint venture by Knight Ridder and Tribune Company in July, CareerBuilder absorbed competitor boards CareerPath.com and then Headhunter.net which had already acquired CareerMosaic. Even with these aggressive mergers, CareerBuilder still trailed behind the number one employment site Jobsonline.com, number two Monster.com and number three Hotjobs.com.

Monster.com made a move in 2001 to purchase Hotjobs.com for $374 million in stock, but the bid was unsuccessful due to Yahoo's unsolicited cash and stock bid of $430 million late in the year. Yahoo had previously announced plans to enter the job board business but decided to jump start that venture by purchasing the established brand. In February 2010, Monster acquired HotJobs from Yahoo for $225 million.

=== Job postings ===
A job board is a website that facilitates job hunting, ranging from large-scale generalist sites to niche job boards for job categories such as engineering, legal, insurance, social work, teaching, mobile app development as well as cross-sector categories such as green jobs, ethical jobs and seasonal jobs. Users can typically upload their résumés, and submit them to potential employers and recruiters for review, while employers and recruiters can post job ads and search for potential employees.

The term "job search engine" might refer to a job board with a search engine-style interface, or to a website that actually indexes and searches other websites.

Niche job boards have increasingly focused on providing targeted job listings for specific industries or roles, connecting candidates with relevant employers more efficiently. Examples include boards dedicated to airport jobs and government positions. USAJobs.gov serves as the United States' official federal employment website, aggregating job listings from over 500 federal agencies.

=== Employer review website ===
An employer review website is a type of employment website where past and current employees post comments about their experiences working for a company or organization. An employer review website usually takes the form of an internet forum. Typical comments are about management, working conditions, and pay. Although employer review websites may produce links to potential employers, they do not necessarily list vacancies.

=== Websites providing information and advice for employees, employers and job seekers ===
Although many sites that provide access to job advertisements include pages with advice about writing résumés and CVs, performing well in interviews, and other topics of interest to job seekers there are sites that specialize in providing information of this kind, rather than job opportunities. One such is Working in Canada. It does provide links to the Canadian Job Bank. However, most of its content is information about local labor markets (in Canada), requirements for working in various occupations, information about relevant laws and regulations, government services and grants, and so on. Most items could be of interest to people in various roles and conditions including those considering career options, job seekers, employers and employees.

== Revenue models ==
Employment sites typically charge fees to employers for listing job postings. Often these are flat fees for a specific duration (30 days, 60 days, etc). Other sites may allow employers to post basic listings for free, but charge a fee for more prominent placement of listings in search results. Employment sites like job aggregators use "pay-per-click" or pay-for-performance models, where the employer listing the job pays for clicks on the listing.

In Japan, some sites have come under fire for allowing employers to list a job for free for an initial duration, then charging exorbitant fees after the free period expires. Most of these sites seem to have appeared within the last year in response to the labor shortage in Japan.

== Risks ==
Many job search engines and job boards encourage users to post their résumé and contact details. While this is attractive for the site operators (who sell access to the résumé bank to headhunters and recruiters), job-seekers should exercise caution in uploading personal information, since they have no control over where their résumé will eventually be seen. Their résumé may be viewed by a current employer or, worse, by criminals who may use information from it to amass and sell personal contact information, or even perpetrate identity theft.

== See also ==
- Career-oriented social networking market
- Freelance marketplace
- .jobs
- Job wrapping
- List of employment websites
