= List of Harvard Business School alumni =

This is a list of notable alumni of Harvard Business School, the business school of Harvard University.

== MBA ==
- Bill Ackman, 1992 – hedge fund manager
- Geeta Aiyer, 1985 – Indian founder and president of Boston Common Asset Management
- Paul V. Applegarth, 1974 – first CEO of the Millennium Challenge Corporation and executive with World Bank, Bank of America, and American Express
- Adam Aron, chairman and CEO of AMC Theatres
- Gerry Ashworth – Olympic gold medalist sprinter
- Joseph L. Badaracco – senior associate dean, chair, and professor of business ethics, HBS MBA program; author
- Rahul Bajaj, 1964 – Indian CEO of Bajaj Auto
- Raymond W. Baker, 1960 – director of Global Financial Integrity
- Jim Balsillie, 1989 – billionaire co-CEO of Research In Motion
- Steve Bannon – former White House advisor and former chairman of Breitbart News Network
- Rye Barcott, 2009- Co-founder and CEO of With Honor
- Alex Behring – co-founder and managing partner of 3G Capital
- Tarek Ben Halim – investment banker and founder of Alfanar, a venture philanthropy organization
- Ricardo Poma
- Guy Berruyer – French CEO of Sage Group
- Ernesto Bertarelli - Italian-born Swiss billionaire businessman and philanthropist.
- Paul Bilzerian (born 1950), financier convicted of securities fraud
- Len Blavatnik, 1989 – Ukrainian-American businessman
- Michael Bloomberg, 1966 – former mayor of New York City
- Dan Bricklin, 1979 – inventor of the electronic spreadsheet
- Tracy Britt Cool, 2009 – entrepreneur; former director of Berkshire Hathaway and subsidiaries
- Charles Bunch, 1979 – CEO of PPG Industries
- Jean Burelle (born 1938/39) – French billionaire chairman and CEO of Burelle
- Steve Burke – NBCUniversal CEO; Comcast executive vice president
- George W. Bush, 1975 – 43rd President of the United States and former Governor of Texas
- Liam Byrne, 2010 – politician, British Labour Party Member of parliament
- Philip Caldwell, 1942 – chairman and CEO of the Ford Motor Company
- Chase Carey, 1980 – president of News Corporation
- Cynthia Carroll, 1989 – former CEO of Anglo American PLC
- Donald J. Carty, 1971 – chairman and CEO of American Airlines
- Elaine Chao, 1979 – U.S. Secretary of Transportation and former U.S. Secretary of Labor
- P. Chidambaram, 1968 – former Union Minister of Finance in India
- Teresa Clarke – former managing director of Goldman Sachs (2004–2010) and CEO and founder of Africa.com
- Vittorio Colao, 1990 – CEO of Vodafone Group
- Scott Cook, 1976 – Co-founder of Intuit
- Sherry Coutu, 1993 – former CEO and angel investor
- Stephen Covey, 1957 – self-help author
- Zoe Cruz, 1982 – banker; former co-president of Morgan Stanley
- Philip Hart Cullom, 1988 – U.S. Navy Vice Admiral
- John D'Agostino, 2002 – managing director of Alkeon Capital and subject of best-selling book Rigged: The True Story of a Wall Street Novice who Changed the World of Oil Forever
- Daniel A. D'Aniello, 1974 – co-founder of The Carlyle Group
- Ray Dalio, 1973 – founded Bridgewater Associates
- Jeffrey Deitch, 1978 – art dealer and gallerist
- Elisabeth DeMarse, 1980 – CEO of Newser
- Anne Dias-Griffin, 1997 – hedge fund manager for Aragon Global Management
- Betty Jane Diener, 1964 (and DBA, 1974) – Virginia Secretary of Commerce (1982–1986)
- Jamie Dimon, 1982 – CEO and chairman of JPMorgan Chase
- James Dinan, 1985 – founder of hedge fund York Capital Management
- Tim Draper, 1984 – venture capital investor
- Colin Drummond – CEO of Viridor and joint CEO of Pennon Group
- Donna Dubinsky, 1981 – CEO of Palm, Inc.
- Axel Dumas, 2010 – CEO of Hermès
- Erik Engstrom, 2015 – CEO of Reed Elsevier
- Mary Callahan Erdoes, 1993 – CEO of J.P. Morgan Asset Management
- Mark Ein, 1992 – venture caplaitlist and owner of sports teams
- Sheldon Erikson, 1970 – chairman, president and CEO of Cameron International Corporation
- Diana Farrell 1991 – president and CEO of JPMorgan Chase Institute
- Nicholas Ferguson – chairman of BskyB
- Mark Fields, 1989 – president and CEO of Ford Motor Company
- Randy Fine, 1998 – U.S. Representative and gambling industry executive
- Barbara Hackman Franklin, 1964 – 29th U.S. Secretary of Commerce
- Jane Fraser, 1994 – CEO of Citigroup
- Morten Friis, 1979 – Chief Risk Officer of Royal Bank of Canada
- Orit Gadiesh, 1977- Israeli-American chairperson of management consulting firm Bain & Company
- Gregory Gray Garland Jr., 1949 – lawyer and business executive; chairman of the Pittsburgh and Lake Erie Railroad
- William W. George – senior fellow and professor, HBS MBA program; author; former chair and CEO of Medtronic
- Brad Gerstner, 2000 – founder of Altimeter Capital
- Lou Gerstner, 1965 – former CEO of IBM
- Shikhar Ghosh, 1980 – entrepreneur, lecturer at HBS
- Mauricio González Sfeir, 1982 - Secretary of Energy of Bolivia and Executive President of YPFB (1993-1997); president of The Strongest professional football soccer team
- Melvin Gordon, 1943 – CEO of Tootsie Roll Industries (1962–2015)
- Mareva Grabowski-Mitsotakis - business executive and spouse of the Prime Minister of Greece
- Allan Gray, 1965 – founder of Allan Gray Investment Management and philanthropist
- Jonathan Grayer, 1990 – CEO of Kaplan, Inc. and Founder and CEO of Imagine Learning
- John Grayken – billionaire founder of Lone Star Funds
- C. Scott Green, 1989 – president of the University of Idaho
- Ranjay Gulati – professor, HBS MBA program, author
- Rajat Gupta, 1973 – former managing director of McKinsey & Company; convicted of insider trading in the 2011 Galleon Group case
- Walter A. Haas Jr., 1939 – CEO of Levi Strauss & Co.
- Ken Hakuta, 1977 – entrepreneur and inventor
- Dido Harding - British Conservative Party businesswoman serving as chairwoman of NHS Improvement since 2017
- Jeff Harmenning - 1984 -- CEO of General Mills
- Josh Harris, 1990 – co-founder of Apollo Global Management and owner of the NBA's Philadelphia 76ers, the NHL's New Jersey Devils, and the NFL's Washington Commanders
- Fred Hassan, 1972 – CEO of Schering-Plough
- Frances Haugen, 2011 – data engineer and Facebook whistleblower
- Rodney A. Hawes Jr., 1969 – CEO of LifeRe and benefactor of the Hawes Hall classroom building
- Randy Haykin, 1988 – founder of The Intersection Event and The Gratitude Network
- Fritz Henderson, 1984 – former president and CEO of General Motors
- John B. Hess, 1977 – CEO of Hess Corporation
- Angie Hicks, 2000 – Co-founder of Angie's List
- Andy Hill, 1990 – politician, Washington State Senator
- Douglas Hodge, 1984 – CEO of PIMCO, pled guilty to fraud for allegedly participating in the 2019 college admissions bribery scandal
- Robert Hoffman, co-founder, National Lampoon, art collector
- Chris Hohn, 1993 – British activist investor, billionaire, philanthropist, founder of The Children's Investment Fund Foundation
- Yoshito Hori, 1991 – founder of Globis University Graduate School of Management
- Darren Huston, 1994 – CEO of Priceline
- Jennifer Hyman, 2009 – Co-founder and CEO of Rent the Runway
- Jeff Immelt, 1982 – former chairman and CEO of General Electric
- Andy Jassy, 1997 – CEO, Amazon
- Abigail Johnson, 1988 – chairman of Fidelity Investments
- Ron Johnson, 1984 – former CEO of J. C. Penney
- Henry Juszkiewicz, 1979 – CEO of Gibson Guitars Inc.
- George Kaiser, 1966 – chairman of BOK Financial Corporation
- Steven Kandarian – CEO of Metlife Group
- Judith Kent, business executive and philanthropist
- Salman Khan, 2003 – founder of Khan Academy
- Naina Lal Kidwai, 1982 – Indian Group General Manager and Country Head of HSBC India
- Seth Klarman – billionaire hedge fund manager; Baupost Group founder
- Jim Koch, 1978 – co-founder and chairman of the Boston Beer Company
- Robert Kraft, 1965 – chairman and CEO of The Kraft Group, owner of the New England Patriots and New England Revolution
- Larry S. Kramer, 1974 – founder and CEO of Marketwatch, president and publisher of USA Today
- A.G. Lafley, 1977 – former CEO and chairman of the board of Procter & Gamble
- Jack Langer (born 1948/1949) – basketball player and investment banker
- Mike LeBlanc, 2019 - United States Marine Corps officer and co-founder of Cobalt Robotics and the Foundation Future Industries
- Stephen D. Lebovitz, 1988 – CEO of CBL & Associates Properties
- Kewsong Lee, 1990 – CEO of The Carlyle Group.
- William Legge, 10th Earl of Dartmouth – UKIP Member of the European Parliament
- Michael Lynton, 1987 – chairman and CEO of Sony Pictures Entertainment
- William MacDonald, 1940 – Christian preacher and writer in the Plymouth Brethren movement
- Anand Mahindra, 1981 – Indian owner and chairman of Mahindra Group
- Nadiem Makarim, 2011 – co-founder and former CEO of Gojek, Minister of Education and Culture of Indonesia
- Stephen Mandel – billionaire hedge fund manager; Lone Pine Capital founder
- Lawrence Marcus, 1940 – Vice-president of Neiman Marcus
- Prince Maximilian of Liechtenstein, 1998 – president and CEO of LGT Group
- Tom McGrath – chairman of Broadway Across America, Broadway and film producer
- Depelsha Thomas McGruder, 1998 - COO of the Ford Foundation, founder of Moms of Black Boys (MOBB) United
- Robert McNamara, 1939 – former Secretary of Defense; former president of World Bank
- W. James McNerney Jr., 1975 – CEO of Boeing
- Richard Menschel, 1959 – (retired) senior director of Goldman Sachs; 2015 winner of the Carnegie Medal of Philanthropy.
- Christopher Michel, 1998 – founder and former CEO of Military.com, and founder and former CEO Affinity Labs
- Hiroshi Mikitani - founder and CEO of Rakuten
- Karen Mills, 1977 – 23rd Administrator of the Small Business Administration
- Ann S. Moore, 1978 – CEO of Time Inc.
- David Nelms, 1987 – CEO of Discover Financial Services
- Grover Norquist, 1981 – president of Americans for Tax Reform
- Mark Okerstrom, 2004 – President/CEO of Expedia Group
- Neil Pasricha, 2007 – author and speaker
- Henry Paulson, 1970 – former U.S. Secretary of the Treasury, former CEO of Goldman Sachs
- John Paulson – president of hedge fund Paulson & Co.
- Art Peck, 1979 – CEO of GAP, Inc.
- Richard B. Peiser, 1973 – scholar and educator in urban planning and real estate development.
- Joseph R. Perella, 1972 – founder and CEO of Wasserstein Perella & Co. and Perella Weinberg Partners
- Chip Perry, 1980 – former president and CEO of TrueCar; first employee and CEO of AutoTrader.com
- Carl Howard Pforzheimer Jr (1907–1996), 1930 – investment banker
- Mark Pincus – CEO of Zynga
- Michael B. Polk – CEO of Newell Brands
- Matthew Prince — Co-founder and CEO of Cloudflare
- Bruce Rauner, 1981 – 42nd Governor of Illinois
- Edwin W. Rawlings, 1939 – U.S. Air Force and president and chairman of General Mills
- James Reed, 1990 – British chairman and chief executive of the Reed group of companies
- John Replogle former CEO of Seventh Generation Inc.
- Gary Rodkin, 1979 – CEO and president of ConAgra Foods
- Mitt Romney, 1975 – 70th Governor of Massachusetts, co-founder of Bain Capital and 2012 presidential nominee of the Republican Party
- Wilbur Ross, 1961 – Secretary of Commerce (2017–2021) under the first Trump administration
- Sheryl Sandberg, 1995 – COO of Facebook
- Ann Sarnoff, 1987 – president of BBC America
- Ulf Mark Schneider, 1993 – CEO of Nestlé, and former CEO of Fresenius
- Gerry Schwartz, 1970 - founder, chairman and CEO of Onex Corporation
- Stephen A. Schwarzman, 1972 – founder of Blackstone Group
- Joe Shoen, 1973 – billionaire chairman of AMERCO
- Martin A. Siegel, 1971 — former Kidder, Peabody & Co. investment banker and former Drexel Burnham Lambert managing director; convicted for insider trading in 1987
- Jayant Sinha, 1992 – Union Minister of State for Finance of India
- Chatri Sityodtong, 1999 – chairman and CEO of ONE Championship
- Jeffrey Skilling, 1979 – former CEO of Enron; convicted of securities fraud and insider trading
- Tad Smith – CEO of Sotheby's
- Gunnar Sønsteby, 1947 – Norwegian World War Two resistance fighter, most highly decorated person of Norway
- Guy Spier, 1993 – Swiss-German-Israeli author and investor
- E. Roe Stamps 1974 – founding partner of private equity firm Summit Partners
- Gerald L. Storch – chairman and CEO of Toys "R" Us, Inc.
- Sandra Sucher – businesswoman; professor, HBS MBA program
- Anjali Sud, 2011 – CEO of Vimeo
- Anthony Tan, 2011 – co-founder and CEO of Grab
- Tan Hooi Ling, 2011 – Malaysian co-founder and COO of Grab
- John Thain, 1979 – former CEO of Merrill Lynch
- Pamela Thomas-Graham, 1988 – businesswoman Clorox, Credit Suisse, and Liz Claiborne, author
- Whitney Tilson, 1994 – hedge fund manager, philanthropist, author, and Democratic political activist
- Gerald Tremblay, 1972 – mayor of Montreal and former Quebec Minister of Industry, Commerce, Science and Technology
- Melvin T. Tukman, 1966 – co-founder and president of Tukman Grossman Capital Management
- David Viniar, 1980 – CFO and executive vice president of Goldman Sachs
- Rick Wagoner, 1977 – former CEO of General Motors
- Wendell Weeks, 1987 – chairman, CEO and president of Corning Inc.
- John C. Whitehead, 1947 – former co-chairman of Goldman Sachs
- Meg Whitman, 1979 – president and CEO of Hewlett-Packard
- Glenn Youngkin, 1994 – Governor of Virginia; former co-CEO of The Carlyle Group
- Gideon Yu, 1999 – Former CFO of Facebook and YouTube
- Michelle Zatlyn, 2009 – Canadian co-founder, president, and COO of Cloudflare

== DBA ==
- Jay Lorsch, DBA, 1964 – professor, HBS MBA program; contingency theory contributor; author, DBA (1964)
- George Schussel, DBA, 1966 – founder and former chairman of Digital Consulting Institute and founder of Jellicle Investors, Inc.
- Robert B. Stobaugh, DBA, 1968 – Harvard Business School emeritus professor of Business Administration

== Executive Education ==
=== Advanced Management Program (AMP) ===
An Advanced Management Program is a non-degree senior executive education program.

- Timothy I. Ahern, 1967 – U.S. Air Force Major General
- Gabi Ashkenazi, AMP, 2004 – Chief of the General Staff of Israel Defense Forces
- Jaime Zobel de Ayala, 1963 – Filipino businessman and chairman emeritus of Ayala Corporation
- Julie Bishop, AMP, 1996 – Australian deputy Prime Minister
- Rick Burr, 2013 – Chief of the Australian Army
- Alden W. Clausen, 1966 – World Bank former president
- Christine M. Day, 2002 – Canadian business executive and former CEO of Lululemon
- Y. C. Deveshwar – chairman and CEO of ITC Limited
- Muhammad bin Ibrahim, 2010 – 8th Governor of Central Bank of Malaysia
- Antony Leung, 1999 – financial secretary of Hong Kong
- William Lewis, 2009 – Journalist, British Media Executive
- Minoru Makihara, 1977 – senior corporate advisor, former chairman, president & chief executive officer, Mitsubishi Corporation
- Christopher McCormick – president and CEO of L.L. Bean
- David V. Miller – U.S. Air Force major general
- Michael Mullen, 1991 – Chairman of the Joint Chiefs of Staff, United States armed forces
- A. Sivathanu Pillai, 1991 – honorary distinguished professor of Indian Space Research Organisation
- Matthew Barrett (banker), 1981 – former chairman and CEO, Bank of Montreal; chairman and Chief Executive, Barclays Bank
- Ajay Piramal, 1992 – chairman, Piramal Group
- Ratan Tata, 1975 – chairman and CEO Tata Sons
- Lucius Theus, AMP 57 – Major General in the United States Air Force
- Jim Lovell, 1971 – Astronaut, Apollo 13
- Carlos Jaureguizar, CEO of Sanitas and Bupa Europe&LatinAmerica

=== Other executive education ===
- Paolo Rocca, 1985 – CEO of Techint
- Aigboje Aig-Imoukhuede, 2000 – co-founder Access Bank Plc and founder and chairman, Africa Initiative for Governance
- Ciara – singer
- Vicente Fox – 55th President of Mexico
- Kilma S. Lattin – Emmy Award-winning Native American leader, military veteran, and business man
- Daniel Vasella, PMD, 1989 – president of Novartis AG
