= Continuing education =

Education after initial education

Continuing education is the education undertaken after initial education for either personal or professional reasons. The term is used mainly in the United States and Canada.

Recognized forms of post-secondary learning activities within the domain include: degree credit courses by non-traditional students, non-degree career training, college remediation, workforce training, and formal personal enrichment courses (both on-campus and online).

General continuing education is similar to adult education, at least in being intended for adult learners, especially those beyond traditional undergraduate college or university age.

Frequently, in the United States and Canada continuing education courses are delivered through a division or school of continuing education of a college or university known sometimes as the university extension or extension school. The Organisation for Economic Co-operation and Development argued, however, that continuing education should be "'fully integrated into institutional life rather than being often regarded as a separate and distinctive operation employing different staff' if it is to feed into mainstream programmes and be given the due recognition deserved by this type of provision".

Georgetown University, Michigan State University, and the University of Denver have benefited from non-credit programs as it relates to strengthening partnerships with corporations and government agencies, helping to inform and shape the curriculum for degree programs, and generating revenue to support the academic enterprise.

== Comparable terminology and initiatives ==
Outside the United States and Canada, comparable forms of post-initial education may be described using terms such as adult education, further education, lifelong learning, continuing professional development, upskilling or reskilling.

In Ireland, comparable continuing-education and reskilling initiatives include Springboard+, which provides free or subsidised higher-education courses for upskilling and reskilling, and the Human Capital Initiative, a €300 million programme that commenced in 2020 to expand skills-focused higher-education provision in priority areas. Ireland also has a ten-year Adult Literacy for Life strategy, launched in 2021, focused on adult literacy, numeracy and digital literacy.

== History ==
In the United Kingdom, Oxford University's Department for Continuing Education was founded in 1878, and the Institute of Continuing Education of Cambridge University dates back to 1873.

In the United States, the Chautauqua Institution, originally the Chautauqua Lake Sunday School Assembly, was founded in 1874 "as an educational experiment in out-of-school, vacation learning. It was successful and broadened almost immediately beyond courses for Sunday school teachers to include academic subjects, music, art and physical education."

Harvard University traces its origins in continuing education to 1835 when John Lowell Jr. established the Lowell Institute with a mission to provide free public lectures in Boston. In 1909, then-Harvard President A. Lawrence Lowell, who was also a trustee of the Lowell Institute, expanded plans to offer Lowell Institute public courses directly with Harvard. In 1910, Lowell formally established the Havard Extension School, then referred to as the Commission on Extension Courses. The Harvard Extension School now operates under the Faculty of Arts and Sciences and is one of the 13 degree-granting schools that make up Harvard University. The School has remained in continuous operation since 1910.

Cornell University was among higher education institutions that began offering university-based continuing education, primarily to teachers, through extension courses in the 1870s. As noted in the Cornell Era of February 16, 1877, the university offered a "Tour of the Great Lakes" program for "teachers and others" under the direction of Professor Theodore B. Comstock, head of Cornell's department of geology.

The University of Wisconsin–Madison began its continuing education program in 1907. The New School for Social Research, founded in 1919, was initially devoted to adult education. In 1969, Empire State College, a unit of the State University of New York, was the first institution in the US to exclusively focus on providing higher education to adult learners. In 1976 the University of Florida created its own Division of Continuing Education and most courses were offered on evenings or weekends to accommodate the schedules of working students.

The method of delivery of continuing education can include traditional types of classroom lectures and laboratories. However, many continuing education programs make heavy use of distance education, which not only includes independent study, but can also include videotaped material, broadcast programming or online education which has more recently dominated the distance learning community.

== For professionals ==
Within the domain of continuing education, professional continuing education is a specific learning activity generally characterized by the issuance of a certificate or continuing education units (CEU) for the purpose of documenting attendance at a designated seminar or course of instruction. Licensing bodies in a number of fields (such as teaching and healthcare) impose continuing education requirements on members who hold licenses to continue practicing a particular profession. These requirements are intended to encourage professionals to expand their foundations of knowledge and stay up-to-date on new developments.

Depending on the field, these requirements may be satisfied through college or university coursework, extension courses or conferences and seminars attendance. Although individual professions may have different standards, the most widely accepted standard, developed by the International Association for Continuing Education & Training, is that ten contact hours equals one Continuing Education Unit. Not all professionals use the CEU convention. For example, the American Psychological Association accredits sponsors of continuing education and uses simply a CE approach. In contrast to the CEU, the CE credit is typically one CE credit for each hour of contact.

The World Bank's 2019 World Development Report on the future of work explains that flexible learning opportunities at universities and adult learning programs that allow workers to retrain and retool are vital in order for labor markets to adjust to the future of work.

== See also ==
- Continuing education unit
- Continuing legal education
- Continuing medical education
- Community education
- Dual enrollment
- E-learning
- Independent scholar
- Lifelong learning
- National Council of Labour Colleges
- Workers' Educational Association in Australia and the UK
