= BabyChakra =

Indian internet platform for parents

- Website type: Online community platform for parents
- Available in: English, Hindi
- Headquarters: Phoenix Paragon Plaza, 3B-48/49, LBS Marg, Kurla West, Mumbai, Maharashtra 400070, {{{location_country}}}
- Owner: InfoMoko Technology Pvt. Ltd.
- Key people: Naiyya Saggi (Co-founder), Mitesh Karia (Co-founder)
- Website: babychakra.com
- Commercial: Yes
- Registration: Optional
- Launched: February 2015
- Current status: Active

BabyChakra is an online community platform for parents, headquartered in Mumbai, India. In August 2022, professor Shikhar Ghosh from Harvard Business School conducted a case study on BabyChakra.

== History ==
BabyChakra was launched in February 2015 by Naiyya Saggi and Mitesh Karia. The platform provides information on conception, pregnancy, birth, and early childhood.

In 2015, BabyChakra secured seed funding, followed by a Series-A investment in 2016 from RoundGlass Partners, Artha India Ventures, Microsoft Accelerator Bangalore, Singapore Angel Network, and Mumbai Angels.

In 2017, it was chosen by Google for its Launchpad Accelerator program. BabyChakra represented India at the Google Global Launchpad Accelerator in February 2018 and joined the NITI Aayog Working Committee on Maternal and Child Health.

In 2018, the company received an undisclosed amount in its Series B funding from Mark Mobius-backed Equanimity Ventures Fund and Anand Chandrasekaran, a director at Facebook.

The following year, Rachita Choudhary, former Director of Engineering at FreeCharge, was appointed Head of Engineering, and Samarth Sawhney, a founding member of Jabong and Hopscotch, joined as Head of Growth.

By 2021, BabyChakra had over 25 million mothers and 10,000 doctors. In August 2021, BabyChakra was acquired by MyGlamm.

BabyChakra acquired TinyStep in March 2022 and expanded into the Babycare category in May 2023.

In August 2022, professor Shikhar Ghosh from Harvard Business School conducted a case study on BabyChakra. The study focuses on its journey and the founders' decision to merge with the Good Glamm Group, analyzing the learnings of the founders alongside the growth milestones of the brand.

== Data breach ==
A misconfiguration in one of BabyChakra's servers left over 5.5 million user files exposed to potential hacking. This included photographs and videos of BabyChakra's users, as well as sensitive subjects such as medical test results and prescriptions. Some of these files are said to be associated with the children and families of the affected users.
