= Rodkin =

Rodkin is a surname. Notable people with the surname include:

- Boaz Rodkin, Israeli diplomat
- Gary Rodkin, American businessman
- Jake Rodkin, American video game designer
- Loree Rodkin (born 1949), American jewelry designer
- Marfa Rodkin, Russian artist (oil paintings)
