= Shikhar =

Shikhar may refer to

- Shikhara, a Sanskrit word translating literally to "mountain peak"
- Guru Shikhar, a peak in the Arbuda Mountains, India
- Shikhar (given name), an Indian male given name
- Shikhar (film), a 2005 Indian film
- Shikhar, Doti, a municipality in Nepal
