= Nelms =

Nelms is a surname. Notable people with the surname include:

- Charlie Nelms, American educator
- Cory Nelms (born 1988), American football player
- David Nelms (born 1961), American businessman
- George H. Nelms (1905-1999), Canadian politician
- Jason Nelms (born 1980), American basketball player
- Mike Nelms (born 1955), American football player
