= Outline of Harvard University =

Private university in Cambridge, Massachusetts, US

Harvard University, a private Ivy League university in Cambridge, Massachusetts, was established in 1636 by the Massachusetts legislature. Harvard is the oldest institution of higher learning in the United States, and the first corporation, officially the President and Fellows of Harvard College", chartered in the country.

This outline is provided as an overview of, and topical guide to Harvard University:

== Governing structure ==
- The President and Fellows of Harvard College ("Harvard Corporation")
  - Office of the President
  - Fellows
- Harvard Board of Overseers
  - Secretary
  - Treasurer
    - Harvard University endowment
- University Marshall
- Memorial Church
- Office of the Provost
  - University Library
- Executive Vice President

=== Departments ===
- Financial Administration
- Campus Services
- Health Services
- Human Resources
- Information Technology (HUIT)
- Planning and Project Management
- Office of the General Counsel
- Public Affairs & Communications
- Alumni Affairs & Development

== History ==
History of Harvard University

- The Commonwealth of Massachusetts Constitution
  - Chapter V. "THE UNIVERSITY AT CAMBRIDGE, AND ENCOURAGEMENT OF LITERATURE, ETC.
    - Section 1. The University"

== Faculties (schools) ==
- Faculty of Arts and Sciences
  - Harvard College
  - School of Engineering and Applied Sciences (formerly Division)
  - Graduate School of Arts and Sciences
  - Division of Continuing Education
    - Summer School
    - Extension School
- Faculty of Business
  - Harvard Business Publishing
- Faculty of Design
- Faculty of Divinity
- Faculty of Education
- Faculty of Government
- Faculty of Law
- Faculty of Public Health
- Faculty of Medicine
  - School of Dental Medicine

== Campuses ==
- Boston-Allston
  - Campus of Harvard Business School
  - Barry's Corner
- Boston--Longwood Medical and Academic Area
  - Campus of Harvard Medical School
- Boston—Jamaica Plain
  - Arnold Arboretum
- Cambridge-Harvard Square
  - Harvard Houses Historic District
  - Harvard Yard
  - Campus of Harvard Divinity School
  - Campus of Harvard Law School
  - Campus of Radcliffe College
    - Radcliffe Quadrangle
    - Radcliffe Yard
  - Center for Astrophysics | Harvard & Smithsonian
- Petersham
  - Harvard Forest

== People affiliated with Harvard University ==
- John Harvard

=== Alumni ===
- List of Harvard University non-graduate alumni

By nationality
By occupation
By school

- List of Harvard Business School alumni
- List of Harvard Divinity School alumni
- List of Harvard Law School alumni

=== Faculty ===
Harvard's faculty includes numerous renowned scholars including: (biologists) E. O. Wilson and William Kaelin; (biophysicists) Adam Cohen and Xiaowei Zhuang; (physicists) Lisa Randall, Subir Sachdev, and Howard Georgi; (astrophysicists) Alyssa A. Goodman and John M. Kovac; (mathematicians) Shing-Tung Yau and Joe Harris; (computer scientists) Michael O. Rabin and Leslie Valiant; (chemists) Elias Corey, Dudley R. Herschbach, and George M. Whitesides; (literary critics) Helen Vendler, Stephen Greenblatt, Louis Menand, and Stephanie Burt; (composers) Robert D. Levin and Bernard Rands; (lawyers) Alan Dershowitz and Lawrence Lessig; (historians) Henry Louis Gates Jr. and Niall Ferguson, (psychologists) Steven Pinker and Daniel Gilbert; (economists) Amartya Sen, Greg Mankiw, Robert Barro, Stephen Marglin, Jason Furman, Michael Kremer, Oliver Hart, Raj Chetty, Lawrence Summers, and Eric Maskin; (philosophers) Harvey Mansfield, Shirley Williams, Cornel West, and Michael Sandel; (political scientists) Robert Putnam, Steven Levitsky, Danielle Allen, and Joseph Nye.

Past faculty members included: Stephen Jay Gould, Robert Nozick, Stephan Thernstrom, Sanford J. Ungar, Michael Walzer, Martin Feldstein, Roy Glauber, and Stanley Hoffmann.

== Sports ==
- Harvard Crimson
  - Baseball team
  - Basketball: Men's / Women's teams
  - Crew teams
  - Fencing team
  - Football team
  - Ice hockey: Men's / Women's
  - Lacrosse: Men's / Women's teams
  - Rowing team
  - Tennis team
  - Volleyball: Men's / Women's teams
  - Wrestling team

== Events and activities ==
- Harvard–Radcliffe Women's Leadership Project
- Head of the Charles Regatta
- Primal Scream
- Tours of Harvard University
- Traditions of Harvard University
- History and traditions of Harvard commencements

== Buildings and structures ==
=== Libraries ===
- Baker Library
- Countway Center for the History of Medicine
- Gutman Library
- Houghton Library
- Lamont Library
- Quad Library
- Widener Library

=== Museums ===
- Arnold Arboretum – Jamaica Plain/Roslindale
- Harvard Forest – Petersham, MA
- Harvard Museum of Natural History
- Harvard Art Museums
- Peabody Museum

== Associated organizations ==
=== Affiliated hospitals ===
- Beth Israel Deaconess Medical Center
- Boston Children's Hospital
- Brigham and Women's Hospital
- Cambridge Hospital
- Dana–Farber Cancer Institute
- Joslin Diabetes Center
- Massachusetts General Hospital
- Massachusetts Eye and Ear
- Schepens Eye Research Institute

=== Media and publications ===
- The Harvard Crimson
- Harvard Business Review
- Harvard Educational Review
- Harvard Law Review
- Radio broadcasting
  - WHRB
- Television broadcasting
  - Harvard Undergraduate Television (HUTV), formerly Harvard-Radcliffe Television
    - Ivory Tower (Harvard Undergraduate Television)
- Harvard Internet broadcasts

=== Research centers ===
- Harvard Ukrainian Research Institute

=== Other ===
- Ivy League
- Harvard/MIT Cooperative Society
- Harvard University Employees Credit Union

== Miscellaneous ==
- Archival depository at Harvard University
- Crimson
- Employment at Harvard University
- Online learning at Harvard University
- Harvard mascot(s)
- Harvard (name)
- Harvard (trademark)
  - University Asks That Harvard Pilgrim Trademark Case Be Heard in Federal
- Harvard University and the ROTC
- Harvard University fifty-year plan
- Harvard University admissions and enrollment
- Harvard University criticism and controversies
  - The John Harvard statue controversy
  - Gender at Harvard University
  - Ethnicity at Harvard University
- Harvard University endowments
- Harvard University sponsorship
- Harvard University Health Services
- Internet2
- Protests at Harvard University
- Rankings for Harvard University
- School dress at Harvard University

== See also ==
- List of colleges and universities in the United States by endowment
- Index of Harvard University-related articles
