= Haykin =

Haykin is a surname. Notable people with the surname include:

- Michael Haykin (born 1953), writer
- Randy Haykin, American venture capitalist
- Simon Haykin (1931–2025), Canadian electrical engineer
