= Shikhar (given name) =

Shikhar is an Indian masculine given name. Notable people with the name include:

- Shikhar Dhawan (born 1985), Indian cricketer
- Shikhar Ghimirey (born 1987), Nepali writer
- Shikhar Ghosh, Indian entrepreneur
