= Terry McCreary =

United States one-star admiral

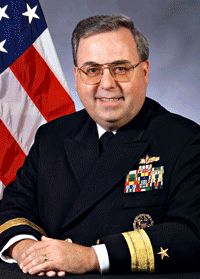
- Born: March 20, 1952 (age 74)
- Occupation: American admiral

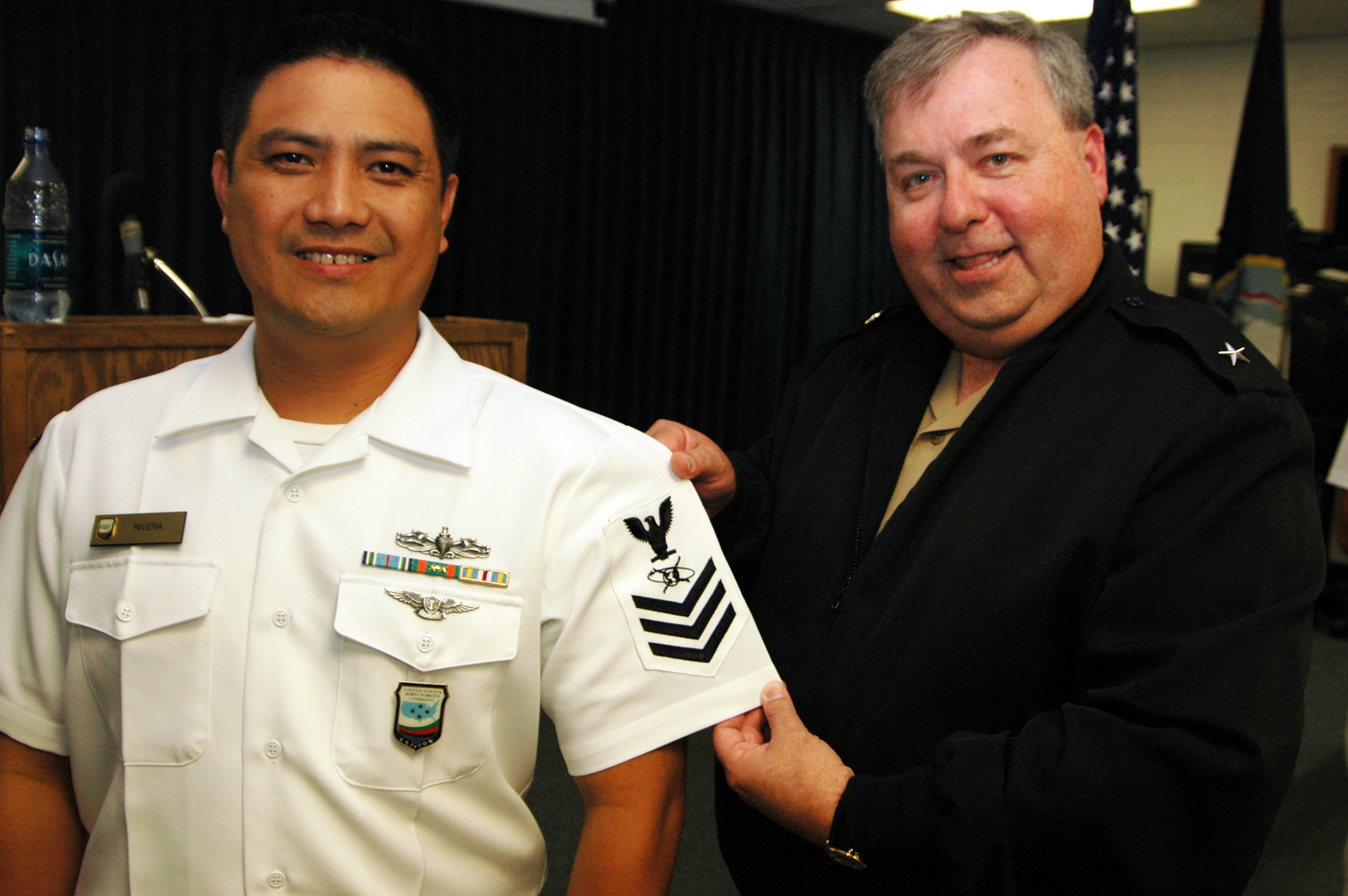
Rear admiral Terry McCreary presenting a rating insignia of a Mass Communication Specialist First Class (MC1).

Admiral Terry L. "T" McCreary (born March 20, 1952) is a retired one-star admiral in the United States Navy and served as the Chief of Naval Information (CHINFO) reporting to the Secretary of the Navy, overseeing the Navy's global public affairs program. Before that, McCreary served as Special Assistant to the Chairman of the Joint Chiefs of Staff. His naval career included leadership positions in a variety of naval and joint assignments. McCreary retired from the Navy in 2006 after 27 years of service, then served as the Strategic Communication Director of the U.S. Special Operations Command and the National Counterterrorism Center.

== Early life ==
McCreary was born in Cincinnati, Ohio, to Paul McCreary and Dolores Orcutt Thelen. He traveled from 1968 to 1971 with the International cast of Up with People and received his high school diploma while touring in 1970. He graduated from Northern Kentucky University with a B.A. in history in 1978.

== Navy career ==
McCreary was commissioned as a surface warfare officer in the Pacific Fleet in 1979, where he served as an electrical officer and main propulsion assistant aboard the destroyer USS O'Brien (DD 975). During his sea tour in the Western Pacific and Indian Ocean (from 1979 to 1983), he applied for and received re-designation as a public affairs officer (PAO). McCreary spent the first two years of his PAO tour in the Navy Office of Information in Atlanta, handling regional media issues in Florida, Virginia, Alabama, and Mississippi. He then went to Yokosuka, Japan, where he served as the assistant public affairs officer for the commander of the U.S. Seventh Fleet.

After completing a master's degree in Mass Communications and Public Relations at San Diego State University in 1986, McCreary headed to Washington, D.C., as the news director for "Navy News This Week," the Navy's half-hour internal TV news show. He returned to the waterfront in 1989 as the public affairs officer (PAO) aboard the USS Missouri (BB-63). McCreary served on the battleship during Operation Desert Storm in the Persian Gulf, and remained on board until it was decommissioned in March 1992.

McCreary next reported to Submarine Group Five in San Diego where he served as a public affairs officer until June 1994. From there, he moved to Manama, Bahrain, where he served as the public affairs officer for Commander, U.S. Naval Forces Central Command, U.S. 5th Fleet. Among other events, he dealt with media after 19 U.S. military service personnel were killed in the Khobar Towers bombing of 1996 in Dhahran, Saudi Arabia.

In August 1997, McCreary returned to Washington, D.C., to serve as the public affairs officer for the Bureau of Naval Personnel. In February 1999, McCreary became the director of public affairs for the commander of U.S. Pacific Command, headquartered in Pearl Harbor, Hawaii. He returned to Washington in August 2000.

McCreary was serving as a Special Assistant to the 14th Chairman of the Joint Chiefs of Staff, General Hugh Shelton at the Pentagon when it was attacked on September 11. He remained in that position for the first two years of General Richard B. Myers' tenure as Chairman. During that time, Operations Enduring Freedom and Iraqi Freedom were conducted, and he routinely worked with senior Pentagon officials and national news media.

McCreary was part of the public affairs team that pushed to embed journalists in military units, insisting that the face of war should be the troops and that the reality of the danger would lead to more accurate media coverage. He reasoned that if people could not agree on the reason of the war, they could at least unite behind the troops in a show of support for America's sons and daughters. "What better way for people to understand [the issue] than to put the face of the troops as the face of the war, rather than one or two spokesman up on a podium?" he said.

McCreary became the U.S. Navy's Chief of Information in July 2003. As CHINFO, McCreary was responsible for the largest transformation of the Navy's public and internal communications since its inception. He was responsible for creating the Mass Communication Specialist (MC) rating for Navy personnel, combining the skills sets of photographers, journalists, lithographers and illustrator-draftsmen. He also helped lead an overhaul of the Navy's website, revamping its structure and content, and adding new technologies such as podcasts and RSS feeds.

== Post-Navy career ==
After 27 years of service, McCreary retired as a rear admiral in July 2006. He then served as the Director of Communication for the National Counterterrorism Center and U.S. Special Operations Command before becoming the president of Military.com (Military Advantage) in December 2008. Between 2010 and 2012, McCreary oversaw Military Advantage's Affinity Labs operations in Europe whose product manager in London reported to McCreary in the U.S. until it closed in 2012. He was a Vice President of Monster Worldwide between 2010 and 2014.

He now works part-time as an entertainment consultant. He pushes to hire veterans, teaming up with the U.S. Chamber of Commerce, USO, and other organizations to host nationwide job fairs catering to returning vets, seasoned vets, and their spouses. In March 2011, he joined the National Campaign Committee of the Code of Support Foundation, a nonprofit military service organization that raises funds for various troop-support services.

== Personal life ==
McCreary and his wife, Maria Josephina McCreary, have two adult children. They currently live in Florida.
