= Affinity Labs =

U.S. social networking site company

Affinity Labs Inc.
- Company type: Public
- Available in: multilingual
- Founded: 2006
- Headquarters: San Francisco, California, U.S.
- Website: affinitylabs.com
- Current status: Defunct

Affinity Labs was a company that built social networking sites for niche groups such as firefighters, police officers, nurses and the Armed Forces. In January 2008, Affinity Labs was merged into Monster.com in a $61 million transaction.

Affinity Labs sites have over a million registered members, as of January 2008. PoliceLink, aimed at law enforcement personnel, is one of Affinity Labs' most active sites with over 717,000 unique visitors per month. Other sites include: SalesHQ, ArtBistro, TheApple, FireLink, NursingLink, InsideTech, GovCentral, IndiaOn, Excelle, AllHealthCare, and the European communities, HMForces.co.uk, ProNurse, and WerPflegtWen.

In 2008 after Monster acquired Affinity Labs, it then bought a French military website, Armees.com for an undisclosed fee, then transferred the site to its Affinity Labs social networking vertical.

In March 2012, it shut down its European operations. Despite HMForces.co.uk being its most successful vertical, and having shared resources with Military.com, the global recession did not assist its longevity. HMForces.co.uk still has a strong presence on social networking sites to this day, evidence of its popularity. Further references to this military vertical can be found on UK e-commerce sites, and there is also a HMForces blog still surviving despite it not being updated regularly. However most Affinity Labs social networking domains and content have been amalgamated into the Monster Worldwide global brand as of 2021.

== History ==
Affinity Labs was founded by Christopher Michel in 2006 after he sold Military.com to Monster in 2004 for $40 million.

The Mayfield Fund and Trinity Ventures invested in Affinity Labs prior to its Monster Worldwide buyout.

Between 2010 and 2014, the President of Military Advantage and Vice President of Monster Worldwide, was former Navy Admiral Terry McCreary. He oversaw the military Affinity operations in Europe which had a product manager in London reporting to the former Admiral in the US. However, this operation was closed down in 2012 after Monster unsuccessfully bid for a Recruiting Partnering Project (RPP) with the UK's Ministry of Defence. Capita won and signed the contract worth £44 million over 10 years.
