= Melvin T. Tukman =

American investor

- Education: Hunter College; Harvard Business School
- Occupations: Asset manager, investor, philanthropist
- Spouse: Lois Tukman

Melvin T. Tukman is an American asset manager, investor and philanthropist. He is the co-founder and president of Tukman Grossman Capital Management, an investment firm based in Larkspur, California. He has managed capital for the International Monetary Fund and Stanford University. He is a large donor to the Harvard Business School.

== Early life ==
Melvin Theodore Tukman graduated from Hunter College, where he received a bachelor of arts degree. He received a master in business administration from the Harvard Business School in 1966.

== Career ==
Tukman began his career as an investment manager in 1971.

With Dan Grossman, Tukman co-founded Tukman Grossman Capital Management, an investment firm formerly known as Tukman Capital Management based in Larkspur, California, in 1980. Their initial investment was US$11 million. By 1991, the firm has US$496 million of assets under management, and it invested capital for Stanford University and the International Monetary Fund. Some of its investments included shareholdings in Ralston Purina, Anheuser-Busch and GEICO. By 1995, the firm was the fourth largest shareholder of CBS and the seventh largest shareholder of Capital Cities Communications (totalling 2.3 million shares).

== Philanthropy ==
Tukman has made charitable donations to his alma mater, the Harvard Business School. He endowed the Mel Tukman Dean’s Fund at the HBS in 1999, which funded the Tukman Fellowship, awarded to academics Dennis W. Campbell, Noam T. Wasserman, Scott A. Snook and Shikhar Ghosh. In March 2015, the fellowship was renamed the Mel Tukman Senior Lectureship after he donated to the Harvard Business School Campaign.

With his wife, Tukman supports the Lois and Mel Tukman Endowed Assistant Professorship at Cornell University, which is held by Tashara Marie Leak. They have also donated to New Leaders.

== Personal life ==
Tukman has a wife, Lois, who formerly served on the board of trustees of The Branson School. They summer in Chilmark on Martha's Vineyard, where they have owned a summer house since 1989.
