= Student Sponsorship Programme South Africa =

Education non-profit

- Company type: Non-governmental organisation
- Founded: 1999
- Founder: Teresa Clarke, Nyagaka Ongeri and Gerri Engelman
- Headquarters: Johannesburg, South Africa
- Area served: Gauteng Eastern Cape
- Key people: Teresa Clarke (Trustee); Nyagaka Ongeri (Trustee); Itumeleng Kgaboesele (Trustee); Tandiwe Njobe (Trustee)
- Services: Student Sponsorship
- Number of employees: 16
- Website: ssp.org.za

Student Sponsorship Programme South Africa (SSP SA) is a non-profit trust based in Johannesburg, South Africa that enables academically distinguished, economically disadvantaged students to excel at some of the top private and public high schools in the Gauteng and Eastern Cape provinces. The SSP process begins by recruiting exceptional students from underprivileged communities and placing those students into top private and public high schools of nearby districts. To complete the process and ensure a positive outcome, SSP provides extensive support services for the students and their parents throughout all the high school years.

== History ==
SSP was founded in 1999 by Teresa Clarke, Nyagaka Ongeri and Gerri Engelman. In 2000, SSP placed 25 students in three high schools in Johannesburg: St Mary's School, Waverley, St. Stithians College, and King Edward VII School. Each of those 25 students was matched with a mentor for the full five years of high school. The programme performed exceptionally well, in that all 25 students completed the eighth grade.

In the first classes of graduates, 94% of the SSP scholars graduated from high school, and 95% of those graduates went on to university, the majority following degrees in the areas of finance, engineering, advertising/marketing, law and medicine. SSP is working towards providing opportunities for all students to attend a top educational institution, and ultimately, to receive a university degree and enter the workforce.

In 2007, most of SSP scholars achieved higher marks than their peers in their schools, as demonstrated by their scorecards. And many of them were elected to a number of leadership positions, including Head Boy/Girl, Deputy Head Boy/Girl, Prefect, Head of House, and sport's team captain.

The huge success of the programme for the following years allowed SSP to secure for additional funding necessary to continue to accept more students. In 2009, there were almost 400 students in the programme, including 177 alumni.

On 24 February 2011, SSP celebrated its 10th anniversary. The celebrations, including a gala dinner, focused on having placed over 610 students through the program, including 365 current scholars and 245 alumni, as well as the number of current partner schools and the excellent passing rate. More than 90% of SSP scholars will continue their studies at tertiary level.

As of February 2011, SSP is a Partner Organization with Princeton in Africa. SSP also partners with Hotchkiss Summer School (sending 2 students every summer), Family Life Center, Young & Able, and Impact Young Lives Foundation.

== Overview ==
Education in South Africa still is the largest single beneficiary of the government public expenditure as it is a key figure to reducing poverty and accelerating long-term economic development and sustainability. In fact, South Africa has one of the highest rates of public investment in education in the world. The Government expenditure for education grew 14% a year for the past 4 years, accounting for R 104,4 billion ($14.31 billion US dollars) in 2009 and nearly R 165,0 billion ($22.73 billion US dollars) in 2010.

Schooling is compulsory between the ages of seven and 15 years. All learners are guaranteed access to quality learning. There are two types of schools: independent (private) and public.

By mid-2007, the South African public education system had 12,3 million learners, 387.000 educators and about 26.592 schools, including 400 special-needs schools and 1.098 registered private schools. Of all schools, 6.000 were secondary schools (grades eight to 12) and the rest were primary schools (grades one to seven). The department aims to have 800,000 pupils enrolled in Grade R by 2010. By February 2009, 1 732 Grade R sites had registered with the then Department of Education, catering for about 45 950 learners.

In 2008, Grade 12 learners wrote the first National Senior Certificate (NSC) based on the new National Curriculum Statement (NCS). A total of 589,912 learners enrolled for the NSC examinations. The pass rate was 62.5%. In 2009, 68,129 candidates wrote the NSC examination, achieving a pass rate of 60.7%.

A report by the Organisation for Economic Co-operation and Development (OECD) on education in South Africa has found that while the education system has achieved a number of positive results in the past 14 years, it is still in a process of transition, and is suffering from a lack of resources and infrastructure.

Even with the efforts currently undertaken by the government to close the educational divide, huge differences still prevail. Years of unequal educational opportunities have led to a deficient public education system, especially in rural areas. Differences are notorious between poorer, rural provinces like Eastern Cape and KwaZulu-Natal and more affluent and thriving provinces such as Gauteng and the Western Cape. Illiteracy rates currently stand just below 20% for people over 15 years old, roughly 9 million adults are not functionally literate, teachers in township schools are poorly trained and funded. While 65% of whites over 20 years old and 40% of Indians have a high school or higher degree, amongst coloured population the rate is 17% and for black population is a mere 14%.

Other government efforts include targeting the most in need for proper education, with two specially designed programmes. One is fee-exempt schools, institutions that receive all their required funding from the state and so they do not have to charge such fees. This fee-free schools, targeting the poorest of the poor, have been carefully identified in the country's most poverty-stricken areas, and by 2007 they made up almost 40% of the schools.

The other is the National Schools Nutrition Programme, which feeds daily about seven millions scholars, including all those attending primary schools in 13 rural and eight urban poverty pockets. The programme was extended in 2009 to 1,500 secondary schools around the country, feeding one million secondary scholars from grades 8th to 12th.

== Admission process ==
SSP finances five years of high school education at one of its partner schools. They begin the recruiting process at public primary schools located in underprivileged districts across the Gauteng and Eastern Cape provinces. Students who are currently in grade six participate in the recruitment process which includes an entrance exam as well as various rigorous interviews.

The main criteria for acceptance into the programme includes academic excellence, financial need and leadership skills. The SSP selection process is purposely rigorous to prepare the students to face the academic challenge of changing their learning environment to a more complex and challenging one in the partner schools.

== Partner schools ==
The partner schools are selected using the following criteria:

- Graduation and University placement rates,
- Overall academic excellence and opportunities for learning experiences;
- Maintenance of acceptable matric pass,
- Support system of the school, e.g. governing body, headmaster/head mistress;
- Ability to send a critical mass of SSP scholars to the school per year; usually is a group of at least four new 8th graders every year.
- Appointment of an SSP schools coordinator;
- A holistic learning environment that stretches beyond academics, thus including sporting and cultural extracurricular activities.

SSP has developed partnerships with over 20 top high schools in Johannesburg, East London and Grahamstown. Including the following:

- Kingsmead College
- St. John's College
- St. Mary's School
- St. Stithians Boys' College
- King Edward VII School
- Redhill School
- St David's Marist Inanda
- American International School of Johannesburg
- St. Stithians Girls' College
- St. Martin's School
- Brescia House School
- Parktown High School for Girls
- Roedean School
- McCauley House
- Sacred Heart
- SAHETI School
- Jeppe High for Girls
- Pretoria High School for Girls
- Pretoria Boys High School
- St. Alban's College
- Clarendon High School for Girls
- Hudson Park High School
- Selborne College
- St.Andrew's College
- Diocesan School for Girls

== Board of trustees ==
Teresa Clarke – chairman and CEO, Africa.com, and former managing director, Investment Banking Division Goldman Sachs. Ms. Clarke also served on the Board of the Student Sponsorship Partnership in New York for several years and chaired the New Sponsorship Recruitment Committee. She currently is a member of the Council on Foreign Relations, a board member of Southern Africa Legal Services (Legal Resources Centre), and a board member of the Tony Elumelu Foundation in Nigeria, and a board member of the Opportunity Agenda in New York. Ms. Clarke holds a BA in Economics cum laude from Harvard College, an MBA from Harvard Business School and a JD from Harvard Law School.

Nyagaka Ongeri – Managing Principal, ABSA Capital. managing director, Barclays Capital. Former vice-president, J.P. Morgan, Johannesburg, South Africa. Prior to joining J.P. Morgan, he worked on the Debt Capital Markets Desk of Merrill Lynch in New York for four years. Mr. Ongeri holds a BA in finance, summa cum laude, from Howard University and an MBA from Harvard Business School.

Ms. Tandiwe Lumka Njobe- Experience: Director, Standard Bank; Analyst, Deutsche Bank; Senior Analyst, Abt Associates.Academic BA – Smith College, MBA – University of Massachusetts, Amherst

Mr. Itumeleng Kgaboesele- Experience: Co-founder & CEO, Sphere Holdings Academic: BCom, Post-Grad Diploma in Accounting, University of Cape Town; Chartered Accountant (SA)
