= Richard B. Peiser =

American urban planner and academic

Hannington Sengendo
- Born: Houston, Texas, US
- Education: Yale University (Bachelor of Arts); Harvard Business School (Master of Business Administration); University of Cambridge (PhD in Land Economy)
- Occupations: Academic & Urban Planner
- Years active: 1978–present
- Known for: Professional Real Estate Development and New Towns for the Twenty-First Century
- Title: Professor; Harvard Graduate School of Design

Richard B. Peiser is an American scholar and educator in urban planning and real estate development. He has been the Michael D. Spear Professor of Real Estate Development at Harvard University's Graduate School of Design (GSD) since 1998. His work focuses on interdisciplinary areas of real estate finance, urban design, and suburban sprawl. He has authored books, including Professional Real Estate Development and New Towns for the Twenty-First Century.

== Early life and education ==
Peiser was born in Houston, Texas, and raised in Dallas. He is of German-Jewish heritage. His ancestors immigrated from Bavaria and Alsace-Lorraine in the mid-1800s. His father, Maurice Bondy Peiser (1913-2003), was born in Independence, MO, and his mother, Patricia Levy Peiser (1922-2024), was born in Kansas City, MO. His father was a mechanical contractor in Dallas. His mother was one of the first professional social workers, serving as Dallas president and later national secretary of the National Council of Jewish Women (NCJW). She founded the social work department of the Scottish Rite Crippled Children's Hospital in Dallas and received many lifetime achievement awards for her social work and voluntary service.

He graduated magna cum laude and Phi Beta Kappa from Yale University in 1970 with a BA in economics. He earned an MBA from Harvard Business School in 1973 and a PhD in Land Economy from the University of Cambridge in 1980 where he was a member of Magdalene College.

== Career ==
Peiser began his academic career at Southern Methodist University in 1978, where he served as an Assistant Professor of Real Estate and Regional Science until 1985. From 1986 to 1998, he held academic and administrative positions at the University of Southern California, including Associate Professor of Urban and Regional Planning, Founding Director of the Lusk Center for Real Estate, and Founding Director of the Master of Real Estate Development Program within the School of Urban Planning and Development.

In 1987, as the academic director of the newly established Master of Real Estate Development program, he oversaw a student-led project in which 17 graduate students invested $10,000 to design, construct, lease, manage, and sell a half-acre property in Desert Hot Springs in collaboration with developer Robert T. Best.

Since 1998, he has held the position of Michael D. Spear Professor of Real Estate Development at the Graduate School of Design, Harvard University. While at Harvard, he established and directed the university-wide Real Estate Academic Initiative and the Advanced Management Development Program for senior real estate professionals and entrepreneurs. He also directed the Master of Design Studies Program in Real Estate and the Urban Planning program.

After graduating from Harvard Business School, Peiser began his career in 1974 with Gerald D. Hines Interests in Houston. He later co-developed residential, industrial, and mixed-use projects in Texas and California through his own firm. Internationally, he co-managed fund for Chinese real estate investments and was involved in the Southern California Industrial Fund.

== Research ==
Peiser's research covers urban planning, real estate development, housing, and infrastructure finance. His work on urban sprawl challenges assumptions about leapfrog development, arguing it can lead to higher long-term density.

He has written on suburban development, mixed-use transformation, and new town planning, emphasizing strategies for financial viability and resilience during economic downturns.

His research also addresses green space valuation, sustainability, and transit-oriented development. He has published on housing tenure, ownership vs. renting, real estate cycles, development financing, and land use in China.

== Selected publications ==
=== Books ===
- Porter, Douglas R.; Peiser, Richard B. (1984). Financing infrastructure to support community growth. ULI Development component series. Washington, D.C: Urban Land Institute. ISBN 978-0-87420-626-5.
- Porter, Douglas R.; Peiser, Richard B., eds. (1992). Special districts: a useful technique for financing infrastructure (2nd ed.). Washington, D.C: Urban Land Institute. ISBN 978-0-87420-736-1.
- Peiser, Richard B. (2012). Professional real estate development: the ULI guide to the business. David Hamilton (3rd ed.). Washington, D.C: Urban Land Institute. ISBN 978-0-87420-163-5.
- Felson, Marcus; Peiser, Richard B., eds. (1998). Reducing crime through real estate development and management. Washington, D.C: Urban Land Institute. ISBN 978-0-87420-823-8. OCLC 39904413.
- Peiser, Richard B.; Flaxman, Michael; Maddock, Thomas; Goode, Thomas; Bassett, Scott; Mouat, David; Hector, Arias (January 1, 2003). Alternative Futures for Changing Landscapes The Upper San Pedro River Basin In Arizona And Sonora (1st ed.). Island Press. ISBN 978-1-55963-224-9.
- Peiser, Richard B.; Wang, Bing (August 2005). Nexus: Field Studies in Real Estate, Urban Planning and Design. Harvard GSD.
- Peiser, Richard B.; Schmitz, Adrienne; Urban Land Institute, eds. (2007). Regenerating older suburbs. Washington, D.C: Urban Land Institute. ISBN 978-0-87420-980-8.
- Wang, Bing; Peiser, Richard B., eds. (2014). Prestige Retail: Design and Development Perspectives on the High-End, Luxury Goods Market. New York: International Council of Shopping Centers. ISBN 978-1-58268-111-5. OCLC 901159978.
- Squires, Graham; Heurkens, E.; Peiser, Richard B., eds. (2018). Routledge companion to real estate development. London; New York: Routledge, Taylor & Francis Group. doi:10.1201/9781315690889. ISBN 978-1-138-91434-6.
- Peiser, Richard B.; Forsyth, Ann, eds. (2021). New towns for the twenty-first century: a guide to planned communities worldwide. The City in the twenty-first century. Philadelphia, Pennsylvania: University of Pennsylvania Press. ISBN 978-0-8122-5191-3. OCLC 1148866883.

=== Journal article ===
- Nakamura, Shohei; Peiser, Richard; Torto, Raymond (2018-01-01). "Are There Investment Premiums for Mixed-Use Properties?". Journal of Real Estate Research. 40 (1): 1–40. doi:10.1080/10835547.2018.12091489. ISSN 0896-5803.
- Peiser, Richard B. (1984). ""Article". Financial feasibility models in new town development: risk evaluation in the United States". Town Planning Review. 55 (1): 75. doi:10.3828/tpr.55.1.b3057211u4682720. ISSN 0041-0020.
- Tapp, Renee; Peiser, Richard (2023). "An antitrust framework for housing". Environment and Planning A: Economy and Space. 55 (3): 562–582. Bibcode:2023EnPlA..55..562T. doi:10.1177/0308518X221135612. ISSN 0308-518X.
- Forsyth, Ann; Peiser, Richard (2021). "Lessons from planned resettlement and new town experiences for avoiding climate sprawl". Landscape and Urban Planning. 205 103957. Bibcode:2021LUrbP.20503957F. doi:10.1016/j.landurbplan.2020.103957.
- Nakamura, Shohei; Peiser, Richard; Torto, Raymond (2018-01-01). "Are There Investment Premiums for Mixed-Use Properties?". Journal of Real Estate Research. 40 (1): 1–40. doi:10.1080/10835547.2018.12091489. ISSN 0896-5803.
- Du, Jinfeng; Peiser, Richard B. (2014). "Land supply, pricing and local governments' land hoarding in China". Regional Science and Urban Economics. 48: 180–189. Bibcode:2014RSUE...48..180D. doi:10.1016/j.regsciurbeco.2014.07.002.
