= Teresa Clarke =

American businesswoman (born 1963)

Teresa H. Clarke
- Born: February 8, 1963 (age 63); California, United States
- Occupations: President, chairman and CEO at Africa.com; former managing director at Goldman Sachs & Co; co-founder of Student Sponsorship Programme South Africa

Teresa Hillary Clarke (born February 8, 1963), is an American investment banker and entrepreneur. She is a former managing director at Goldman Sachs and co-founded the Student Sponsorship Programme, a scholarship and mentoring non-profit in South African. Since 2010, she has funded and led Africa.com.

== Early life and education ==
Teresa H. Clarke was born and raised in California. Her mother, Dr. Audrey Clarke, served for ten years as the superintendent of schools in Lynwood, California before becoming a professor at California State University.

Clarke holds a bachelor's degree in economics from Harvard College (1980–1984), an MBA from Harvard Business School (1989) and a J.D. from Harvard Law School (1989). She has served on the boards of Southern Africa Legal Services (Legal Resource Centre), the Tony Elumelu Foundation, the Opportunity Agenda, and the Student Sponsorship Programme South Africa.

== Early career ==
In August 1989, Clarke joined the real-estate department at Goldman Sachs & Co in New York as an associate. She worked in the investment banking division for six years before leaving to found and serve as managing director of the South African office of Abt Associates, a Cambridge, Massachusetts public-policy and management consulting firm. Her clients in South Africa included companies such as Transnet (holding company of South African Airways), Johnson & Johnson, and institutions involved in the coordination of the education and public health development sectors.

Clarke lived in South Africa from 1995 to 2000. During her time in South Africa, she also taught corporate finance in the MBA program at Wits Business School.

In 1999, she co-founded Student Sponsorship Programme South Africa (SSP), which provides academically talented but economically disadvantaged South African students with scholarships and support to attend private schools. The Johannesburg-based program has provided more than $10 million in scholarships to over 1000 children. On average, 90 percent of the students complete the program, and about 90 percent of SSP's graduates qualify to attend university.

From 2004 to 2010, Clarke returned to Goldman Sachs. She initially played a role in launching the firm's Global Markets Institute. She later moved back into the investment banking division where she led mergers and acquisitions and corporate finance transactions for Fortune 500 companies in the US and Europe. She also managed the GS Africa Aspen Program, a leadership development project for emerging public- and private-sector African leaders created in cooperation with the Aspen Institute.

== Africa.com ==
On February 12, 2010, Clarke ended a 12-year career at Goldman Sachs to focus on Africa.com. She relaunched Africa.com in February 2010 with the stated goals of changing the way the world engages online with Africa and creating a platform for those changes, stating:

"I've owned the Africa.com domain name for around ten years. In 2000, I was hired to help the firm that owned the domain name figure out what to do with it. When that organization disbanded, I was fortunate enough to secure the ownership of the domain name. "Over most of the last decade, I worked at Goldman Sachs. During my free time, I imagined what I would do with the domain name, and I looked at other African websites." "I love working for Africa.com because our work is so broad. We are embarking upon a deal that will provide our users information on the financial markets in Africa, and we recently published a blog on developments in public education in South Africa. I work with a great team of people that I have hand-chosen, and I couldn't be any happier."

Clarke has been featured as an Africa expert at the World Economic Forum in Africa and India, the Milken Institute, and the Fortune/Time/CNN Global Forum. In 2008, she received the Freedom Day Award from the South African consulate. On November 4, 2010, she spoke at the African Leadership Network's inaugural ceremony. The African Leadership Network event is similar to the World Economic Forum in Davos, but organized by and for Africans and people of African descent. She has also lectured at various institutes of higher learning, including Oxford, Harvard, Princeton, Yale, Stanford, Tufts, and the Wharton School.

On November 7, 2010, Clarke was among the honorees celebrated at BET’s Black Girls Rock! event.

Clarke is the writer, producer, and director of Africa Straight Up, a 30-minute documentary made in partnership with MTV Africa and TEDTalks that was released in 2012. Originally produced for online viewing, the film aired on the Africa Channel in the U.S. and UK, as well as on Dutch Television. It also was screened by The White House, which had contributed to the film's production, during the 2014 United States–Africa Leaders Summit, by the Council on Foreign Relations, and was shown as in-flight entertainment on South African Airways and Arik Airways.

In 2013, Clarke was invited to join The White House Traveling Press Corps and traveled with President Obama and his family to Senegal, South Africa, and Tanzania. That same year, she delivered a TEDx Talk at TEDxEuston in London, "The Diaspora Divide".

In 2014, Clarke was featured on the Harvard Business School website in a video on Making a Difference. Her life story was also the subject of a profile celebrating the 50th Anniversary of Women at Harvard Business School. That year, she was invited to the Fletcher Inclusive Business Summit, held at the Rockefeller Foundation's Bellagio Center.

In November 2014, U.S. secretary of Commerce Penny Pritzker appointed Clarke and 14 other private sector leaders to President Obama's Advisory Council on Doing Business in Africa (PAC-DBIA). Where they advised on strengthening U.S.-Africa commercial engagement..

In May 2020, she led the Africa.com Crisis Management for African Business Leaders webinar series entitled "Women are Proving to Be Great Leaders During COVID-19. Is this the Pathway to Power?" The panel included former deputy president of South Africa, Under Secretary of the United Nations and executive director of UN Women Phumzile Mlambo-Ngcuka, Stanbic Bank Uganda CEO Anne Juuko, Oby Ezekwesili of the Africa Economic Development Policy Initiative, and Zambian youth activist and journalist Natasha Wang Mwansa, the youngest recipient of the WHO Global Health Leaders award.

Clarke is fluent in Spanish, French, and Portuguese and is a member of the Council on Foreign Relations. She has received awards for her work in Africa, including the Government of South Africa's Freedom Day Award, Education Africa's Humanitarian Award for Africa, the Merrill Lynch/Africa 2.0 Business Leadership Award, the International Women's Society Humanitarian of the Year Award, the Malcolm X and Dr. Betty Shabazz Educational Leadership Award, and the Girl Scouts of Connecticut Woman of Achievement. Clarke was named one of the top 25 Women in Business by the Network Journal.

== Boards ==
- Clarke is board chair for The Smithsonian's Museum of African Art

== Personal life ==
Clarke has married twice. Her second marriage took place at Martha's Vineyard on August 4, 2007, to Dr. John Edward Ellis, a professor of anesthesiology and critical care at the Pritzker School of Medicine at the University of Chicago.
