= Harvard Houses Historic District =

Historic district in Massachusetts, United States

- U.S. National Register of Historic Places
- U.S. Historic district
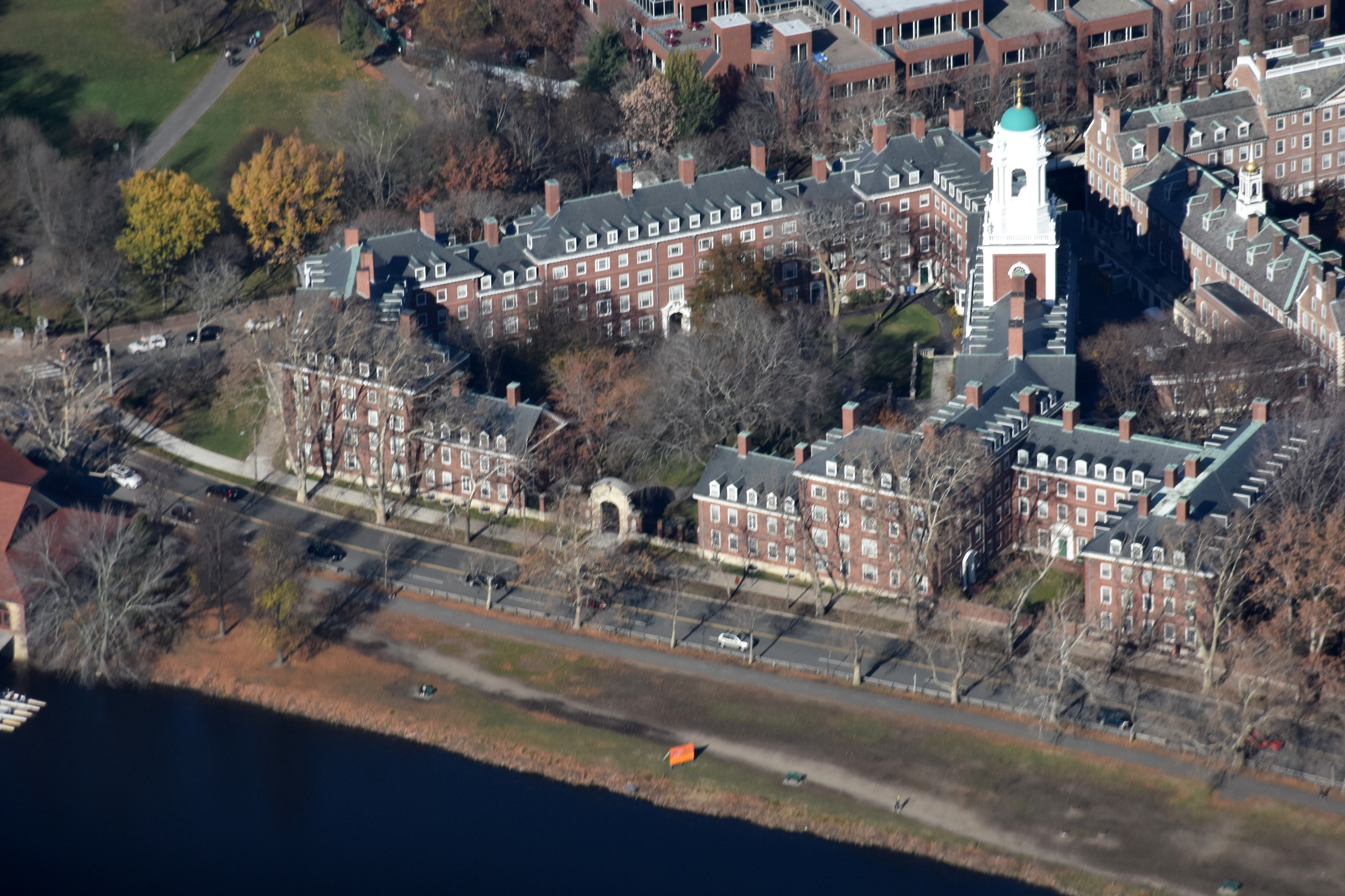
- Eliot House on the Charles River

- Location within Massachusetts Location within the United States
- Location: Cambridge, Massachusetts
- Coordinates: 42°22′12″N 71°7′5″W
- Area: 17.1 acres (6.9 ha)
- Architect: Shepley, Rutan & Coolidge
- Architectural style: Colonial Revival, Georgian
- MPS: Cambridge MRA
- NRHP reference No.: 86002073
- Added to NRHP: September 12, 1986

The Harvard Houses Historic District is a historic district encompassing seven of Harvard College's residential houses. The district is roughly bounded by Mt. Auburn, Grant, and Cowperwaite Streets, Banks Street and Putman Avenue, Memorial Drive, and JFK Street (formerly Boylston Street) in Cambridge, Massachusetts. The contributing buildings to the district are predominantly residential dormitory buildings which were constructed between 1913 and 1930, and are Georgian Revival in style. There are three small residential buildings which were built in the 18th and 19th centuries, and a number of non-contributing later buildings, including among others the towers of Leverett House and the modern portion of Quincy House at 58 Plympton Street. The buildings are an imposing presence in the streetview of Memorial Drive between Western Avenue and the Anderson Memorial Bridge, but their massing is interrupted by mature tree plantings, and they are organized to provide courtyards and quadrangles in the interior of the district.

The district was added to the National Register of Historic Places in 1986.

== See also ==
- National Register of Historic Places listings in Cambridge, Massachusetts
