= Theodore B. Comstock =

American geologist (1849–1915)

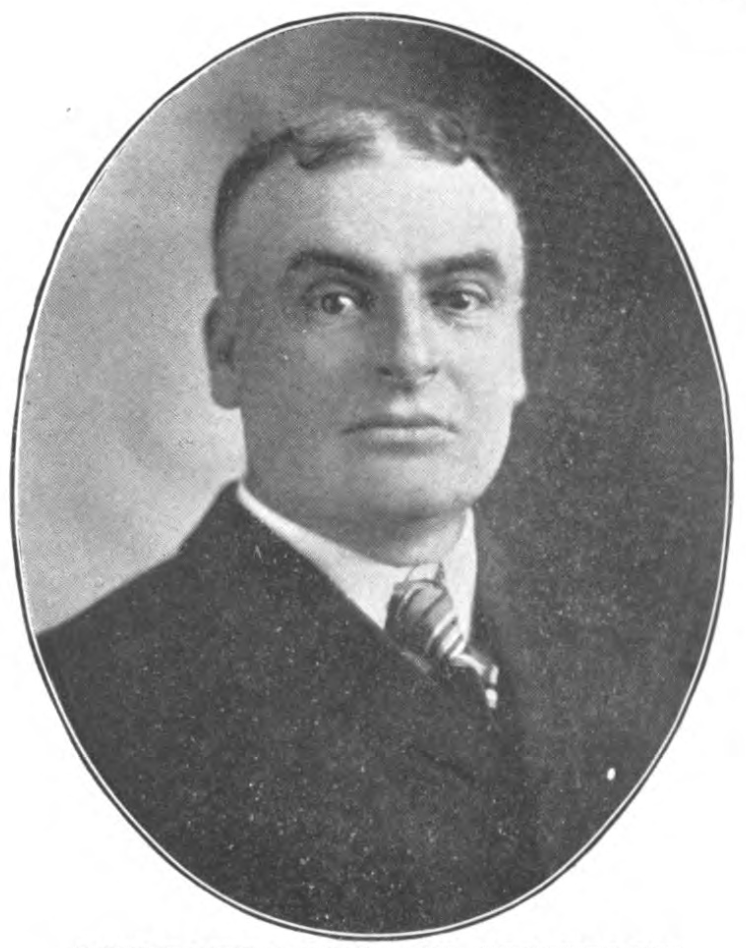

1st President of the University of Arizona
- In office 1894–1895
- Succeeded by: Howard Billman

Personal details
- Born: Theodore Bryant Comstock; July 27, 1849 Cuyahoga Falls, Ohio
- Died: July 26, 1915 (aged 65) Los Angeles, California
- Spouse: Blanche Huggins (m. 1880)
- Education: Pennsylvania State Agricultural College; Cornell University
- Occupation: Geologist, educator, mining consultant

Theodore Bryant Comstock (1849–1915) was an American geologist, educator, university administrator, and mining consultant. He served as the first president of the University of Arizona.

== Early life ==
Theodore B. Comstock was born in Cuyahoga Falls, Ohio on July 27, 1849. He earned a bachelor's degree at Pennsylvania State Agricultural College, and postgraduate degrees from Cornell University. He married Blanche Huggins in 1880.

== Career ==
He was a professor of general and economic geology at Cornell University from 1875 to 1879, and a professor of mining engineering and physics at the University of Illinois from 1885 to 1889.

He served as first president of the University of Arizona from 1894 to 1895. He received a Bachelor of Arts degree from what is now Pennsylvania State University in 1868, a Bachelor of Science in 1870 and D.Sc. in 1886 from Cornell University.

Theodore B. Comstock died at his home in Los Angeles on July 26, 1915.

== Works ==
- Reports on the Geology of Northwestern Wyoming (1874)
- Outline of General Geology (1878)
- Map of San Juan County, Colo. (1882)
- Reports on gold and silver, Arkansas survey, and on the central mineral region of Texas (1889)

He made contributions to American Naturalist, the American Journal of Science, and the Engineering and Mining Journal.
