= Africa.com =

- Type: Private
- Founded: 2001 Launched 2010
- Founder: Teresa Clarke
- Headquarters: New York City, United States
- Area served: Worldwide
- Key people: Teresa Clarke (Founder and CEO); Foluso Phillips (Advisory Board Member); Jendayi Frazer (Advisory Board Member); Vusi Khanyile (Advisory Board Member)
- Products: Travel guidebook, online encyclopedia, online community
- Website: Africa.com

Africa.com is an internet media company, launched in 2010 by Teresa Clarke, which provides coverage on topics such as financial, political and cultural news related to Africa. The purpose of the online web portal is to be a platform for anyone interested to learn more about Africa, as well as provide business and world leaders accurate information about the investment climate.

The Africa.com organization has representation offices in Johannesburg, South Africa, Lagos, Lagos State, and New York City, New York. African American business women and entrepreneur Teresa Clarke is the CEO and founder of the site, CBS News correspondent Jacqueline Adams is the Executive Editor, and Jendayi Frazer (former Ambassador to South Africa) is an advisory board member.

== History ==
Africa.com was launched in February 2010, by Teresa Clarke after resigning from her position as a managing director in the investment banking division of Goldman Sachs & Co. Clarke is also co-founder of the Student Sponsorship Programme in South Africa.

Clarke lived in South Africa from 1995 to 2000 and acquired the domain name around 2001. "Over most of the last decade, I worked at Goldman Sachs. During my free time, I imagined what I would do with the domain name and I looked at other African websites."

In a May 2010 article in The Wall Street Journal, Africa.com was mentioned because of its potential relevance with the impending 2010 FIFA World Cup in South Africa that same year. The site is small, with about 50,000 monthly unique users but Ms. Clarke said she "sees potential in the growth of African investment and a middle class in several African countries." Since then, Africa.com has expanded to add information about each of the continent's 54 countries, with over 30,000 daily visitors according to Alexa.com.

== Partnerships ==
Recently, Africa.com has partnered with a number of well-known content providers, including The Council on Foreign Relations, Foreign Affairs, HAND/EYE Magazines, McKinsey and Company, Freedom House and the Mo Ibrahim Foundation. Africa.com has also published the first and only online museum guide providing detailed information about museums in every African country, thus becoming a heavily visited site and destination for users from different continents interested in Africa. It has also developed its own original content including blogs from the likes of a former president of Nigeria and several U.S. ambassadors to various African countries.

The site aims to provide travel information, financial, political and cultural news, maps, information about international events and non-profit organizations related to Africa, as well as views from a varied array of opinion-leaders. It also provides encyclopedic information about each of the 54 countries on the African continent, with specially written travel information about 54 countries and 27 cities as well as 200 curated videos. Designed in collaboration with Brightcove Inc., Africa.com offers the same flexible, multi-language, on-line video platform used by The New York Times.

In January 2011, Africa.com received over three million page views from almost one million users, the majority from the United States and Europe.

On a March 2011 interview to Memeburn.com, Teresa Clarke said, "For me, ownership of the Africa.com domain name is about more than a business opportunity. I see this as a tremendous privilege and a great responsibility. Whoever owns this domain name has a monumental opportunity to shape how the internet world views Africa. Africa has been very good to me throughout my life and my career, and I wanted to step up to the challenge of ensuring that this great vehicle for change is used responsibly and effectively."

On Thursday April 28, 2011, the President of the Federal Republic of Nigeria, Dr. Goodluck Ebele Jonathan pledged government support and collaboration with the Tony Elumelu Foundation (TEF) when he hosted founder Tony Elumelu and the TEF Advisory Board in Abuja, stating that relevant government institutions will be asked to work with the foundation. The advisory board members who accompanied Elumelu when he paid a courtesy call on the President included Teresa Clarke, founder and CEO of Africa.com and H. E. Shaukat Aziz, former Prime Minister of Pakistan.

Clarke said Africa.com is working on a platform that would allow people to check stock-market prices and make transactions on their cellphones.

== Country profiles ==
Africa.com offers an encyclopedia, nicknamed “Afripedia”, that aims to provide information about each of the 54 sovereign states, including Madagascar and various island groups. Every country profile offers an overview of said country, as well as historic, geographic, economic and social data. The section also includes a fact and figures entry, information about the leaders of the country, and a "Rights and Liberties Report".

The site also offers interaction with Twitter and Facebook, travel and music videos, and short films and documentaries.

== Rights and Liberties Report ==
In partnership with Freedom House, Africa.com brings information on the human rights and civil liberties of every African country. Basic freedoms, political rights, freedom of religion, the right to free speech, free elections, political freedom, Africa human rights.

The "Rights and Liberties Report" is a scored provided by Freedom House, an advocacy organization that monitors and supports the expansion of freedom around the world. The organization has developed a survey to measure and rate worldwide political rights and civil liberties. A rating of 1 indicates the highest degree of freedom and 7 the least amount of freedom. The political rights and civil liberties ratings for each country or territory are combined and averaged to determine an overall "freedom status".

Countries and territories with a combined average rating of 1.0 to 2.5 are considered "Free"; 3.0 to 5.0, "Partly Free"; and 5.5 to 7.0 "Not Free". On Africa.com, upward or downward trend arrows are assigned to countries and territories. Trend arrows indicate general positive or negative trends since the previous survey that are not necessarily reflected in the raw points and does not warrant a ratings change.

== Ibrahim Index ==
Being an aggregator of information regarding the African continent, Africa.com features the Ibrahim Index of African Governance funded and led by the Mo Ibrahim Foundation. It is an attempt to statistically monitor African governance levels throughout all the countries of Africa.

== Safari Wizard ==
Recently Africa.com partnered with Rhino Africa, a South African safari operator, to develop the Safari Wizard guide. This tool aims to help users design a custom safari among the main safari destinations in Africa: South Africa, Tanzania, Kenya, Botswana, Zimbabwe and Namibia. It offers a filter with which users can select different criteria, including location, children facilities, means of transportation, activities, cost, facilities, lodging amenities and animal sightings.

It also offers a Safari Advisor guide that aims to suit different safari customers based on their travel habits, destination of choice, activities they are looking for and additional requirements (e.g. vaccines for yellow fever, malaria, visa requirements, packing tips and safety concerns).

Aside from a traveling blog, it also offers maps and travel information as well as a museum guide for each country, that provides information of when to go, how to get there, what to do, safety and security tips and local advice. The Travel Health section holds information for tourists about vaccinations, medications, and other health advice for travel in Africa.

It also Africa.com offers direct links with other travel website like Tripadvisor.com, Bookingbuddy.com and STA Travel for booking flights, hotels, get deals and organizing trips.

The site offers business and financial information to its visitors, aside from that provided by the finance blog posts, based on information from the Council on Foreign Relations, Reuters Africa and Foreign Affairs magazine. It also offers articles, videos and interviews from McKinsey Quarterly.

Recently Africa.com began to offer the Africa-related articles of HAND/EYE Magazine, a New York-based print and online publication focused on global arts, crafts, design, and culture. HAND/EYE aims to highlight creative projects and ventures originating in Africa.

Africa.com devotes a feature to Africa First, the short film program is sponsored by Focus Features. The Africa First Short Film Program aims to support films that aspire to artistic excellence and accomplished storytelling, and substantially contribute to the development of local film industries. Award recipients of the 2010 Focus Features Africa First Short Film Program can use award money received from Africa First to complete initial production and to pay for post-production costs such as laboratory fees, sound mixing, and editing.

Partnering with SARFM Radio, founded by Zimbabwean Chaka, radio.Africa.com provides with African music in all possible genres from the continent.

== Audience ==
The site's primary audience is American, aims to shape the opinion of Americans on Africa using African sources, rather than the Western media.

Based on a recent study more than 90 percent of Africa.com users have some college or are college graduates and about 22 percent have at least one graduate degree. Their top three areas of interest are travel, business/investment and arts and culture.

Approximately 60 percent of Africa.com users are white or Asian, 23 percent are African and 17 percent are African-American. Approximately 52 percent are male and 48 percent female. More than 50 percent come from the United States; 20 percent from Europe, 20 percent from Asia and the balance from South America, India and South Africa.

More than 70 percent of users connect to Africa.com via broadband. On May 26, 2011, the Facebook page of Africa.com surpassed the 2,500 followers. And as of June 2011 their Twitter account had little over 900 followers.

== Participation in public events ==
- Harvard Business School Africa Club
- Harvard Club of New York City
- Fortune/Time/CNN Global Forum
- Student Sponsorship Programme 10th Anniversary
- SACCA – Africa Platform 2010 Missing Middle Summit
- Black Girls Rock! - BET
- Africa Leadership Network
- Wharton Africa Business Forum
- Princeton Club – Princeton in Africa program
- Madeleine Korbel Albright Institute for Global Affairs at Wellesley College
- Harvard Business School African-American Student Union – Naylor Fitzhugh Conference (Jacqueline Adams)
- The Network Journal 25 Business Women to Watch
- Stanford University's Institute for Economic Policy Research
- League of Black Women
