= Timothy I. Ahern =

United States Air Force general (1924–2003)

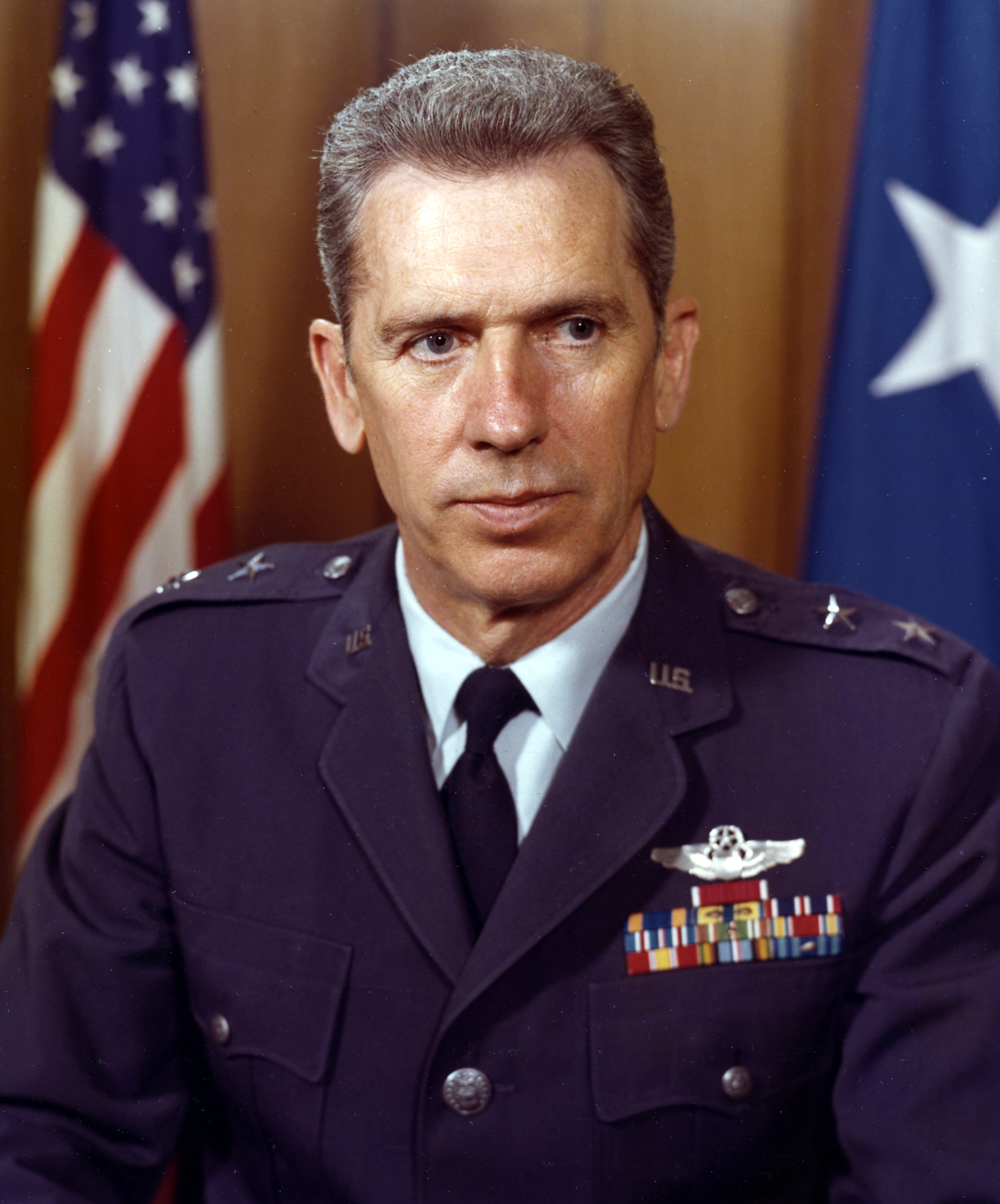
- Born: November 7, 1924; New Haven, Connecticut, U.S.
- Died: April 16, 2003 (aged 78); Arlington, Virginia, U.S.
- Burial place: Arlington National Cemetery
- Military career
- Allegiance: United States of America
- Branch: United States Air Force
- Rank: Major general

Timothy I. Ahern (November 7, 1924 – April 16, 2003) was a major general in the United States Air Force.

== Biography ==
Ahern was born on November 7, 1924, in New Haven, Connecticut. At the age of 15 he entered New Haven State Teachers College. Later he attended the six-week Advanced Management Program (AMP) at Harvard Business School. He married Kathryn L. Teague, widow of USAF Lieutenant Edward F. Teague. They had one child together and also raised Kathryn's son from her first marriage together. Ahern died on April 16, 2003, and is buried with Kathryn L (1922–1989) at Arlington National Cemetery.

== Career ==
Ahern originally enlisted in the United States Army Air Forces in 1943 and commissioned an officer the following year. During World War II he served with the 731st Bombardment Squadron. Following the war he was stationed at Enid Army Airfield in Enid, Oklahoma. Later he would transfer to the Air Force upon its inception. He would be assigned to Scott Air Force Base in St. Clair County, Illinois and Moody Air Force Base in Georgia before serving as executive officer to U.S. Air Force Vice Chief of Staff Thomas D. White. He remained with General White after he was promoted to chief of staff, serving as his aide-de-camp until 1960. Later he was given command of the 325th Fighter-Interceptor Squadron based at Truax Air Force Base in Madison, Wisconsin. The squadron would be deployed to fly fighter-interceptor escort during the Cuban Missile Crisis. In 1968 Ahern was given command of the 57th Fighter-Interceptor Squadron before being assigned to Air Defense Command. He served as commander of the 57th Fighter Group based in Snohomish County, Washington, in 1968 until he was reassigned to The Pentagon. During this time he assisted in modernizing U.S. air defenses. Later in his career he was named Assistant Deputy Chief of Staff of Research and Development of the Air Force. His retirement was effective as of December 1, 1978.

Awards he received include the Air Force Distinguished Service Medal, the Legion of Merit, the Air Medal, the Air Force Commendation Medal with two oak leaf clusters, and the Outstanding Unit Award.
