= David Viniar =

American businessman

David A. Viniar
- Born: 1955 (age 70–71)
- Education: Union College (B.A.); Harvard University (M.B.A.)
- Employer: Goldman Sachs
- Spouse: Susan
- Children: 4

David Alan Viniar is an American businessman who was the CFO and executive vice president at Goldman Sachs from 1999 until January 31, 2013. He is currently on the board of directors of Goldman Sachs.

== Biography ==
A 1972 alumnus of The Bronx High School of Science, Viniar spent summers at Kozan's Bungalow Colony in Ellenville, New York, and graduated from Union College, New York, in 1976, where he majored in economics. He then attended Harvard Business School, earning an MBA in 1980.

After receiving the MBA, Viniar joined Goldman Sachs where he has remained since. He became a partner in 1992, a managing director in 1996 and executive vice president and chief financial officer in 1999. He has been the head of Operations, Technology, Finance and Services Division since December 2002.

Viniar headed the Finance Division and co-head of credit risk management and advisory and firmwide risk from December 2001 to December 2002. He co-headed operations, finance and resources from March 1999 to December 2001. He was CFO of the Goldman Sachs Group, L.P. from March 1999 to May 1999. From July 1998 until March 1999, he was deputy chief financial officer, and from 1994 until July 1998 he was head of finance, with responsibility for controllers and treasury. From 1992 to 1994, he was head of treasury and prior to that was in the Structured Finance Department of investment banking.

In September 2012 Viniar announced that he would be retiring from Goldman Sachs in January 2013. On January 31, 2013, he retired from his positions as CFO and executive vice president and took on the role of director at Goldman Sachs.

On October 30, 2013, Viniar became a director on the board of Square, Inc., the mobile payments firm run by Jack Dorsey.

=== "25 standard deviations" quote ===
On 13 August 2007, The Financial Times reported Viniar's explanation of why two large hedge funds managed by Goldman Sachs had both lost over a quarter of their value in a week, requiring the injection of $3 billion to support them. Viniar ascribed the events to a series of exceptional events: "We were seeing things that were 25 standard deviation moves, several days in a row". This has since been used to illustrate the problems of inappropriate mathematical models in finance, especially those based on the assumption of Normality. Kay & King (2020, p. 68) refer to the 'Viniar problem': 'He confused a probability as calculated within a model with a probability in the world of which the model claimed to be a representation. To make a statement about probability in a real world it is necessary to compound the probability derived from the model itself with the probability that the model itself is true. And there is no means of knowing whether the model is true."

=== Senate testimony ===
Viniar testified in front of the Senate Permanent Subcommittee on Investigations on Tuesday, April 27, 2010 regarding the role of investment banks in the 2008 financial crisis and, specifically, the role of Goldman Sachs in that crisis.

=== Affiliations ===
Viniar served on the board of trustees of Union College and is a member of the board of trustees of both Children's Aid and Family Services and the Financial Accounting Foundation.

=== Family ===
Viniar is married and has four children.
