= Gregory Gray Garland Jr. =

American lawyer and business executive

- Born: April 15, 1924; Richmond, Virginia, U.S.
- Died: May 29, 2020 (aged 96); Pittsburgh, Pennsylvania, U.S.
- Education: Duquesne University School of Law Harvard Business School; University of Virginia (BA); Virginia Military Institute St. Christopher's School
- Occupations: Lawyer, business executive, railroad executive, magazine publisher, novelist
- Employer(s): McCann, Garland, Ridall and Burke Esq
- Organization(s): Pittsburgh and Lake Erie Railroad Union National Bank Unionvale Coal Company

Gregory Gray Garland Jr. (April 15, 1924 – May 29, 2020) was an American attorney, businessman, author, and magazine publisher. He was also chairman of the Pittsburgh and Lake Erie Railroad.

== Early life ==
Garland was born in Richmond, Virginia. His parents were Lula W. and Gregory Gray Garland of 112 Cathedral Place in Richmond. His father was the district superintendent for Autocar Sales and Service Company in Richmond. However, in the mid 1930s, his father became disabled in serious fall.

He attended St. Christopher's School in Richmond, where he graduated in 1942 and received the General Prize for Excellence in Journalism for his work with The Pine Needle. He then enrolled in the Virginia Military Institute for a year.

During World War II in 1943, he enlisted in the U.S. Navy as an ensign. He served as a communications officer on a submarine chaser in the Pacific; his ship was damaged during Typhoon Louise in October 1945. In May 1945, he was sent to a United Nations conference in San Francisco. He was picked for a small group of Navy and Army personnel to attend the conference because of his background, conduct, and talent.

After the war in September 1946, he entered the University of Virginia on the G.I. Bill. While there, he was a member of St. Anthony Hall before graduating with a B.A. in 1947. He also went to Harvard Business School, graduating in 1949. Known as the Gold Rush Class, the Harvard Business School Class of 1949 generated more company presidents and CEOs than any other class.

His father-in-law suggested that he become a lawyer, and Garland enrolled in the Duquesne University School of Law, graduating in 1954.

== Career ==
In 1949, Garland went to Pittsburgh, Pennsylvania with just 24¢ and a Gulf Oil card. He co-founded McCann, Garland, Ridall, and Burke Esq. This law firm specializes in corporate and commercial law, estate planning, nonprofit law, and real estate, but he was most interested in tax law, mergers, and acquisitions.

In 1962, he founded Unionvale Coal Company which distributed coal from Ligonier, Pennsylvania. He also purchased Youngstown Steel Tank, Machinex, and Embassy magazine in New York City. He was chairman Greenville Metals, Pittsburgh and Lake Erie Railroad, Ranger Investments, and Union National Bank. His specialty was to "take companies and turn them around."

He incorporated his wartime and personal life experiences into three novels, including the thriller Top Secret: Escape from Iran.

== Publications ==
- The Swiss Bank Account of Baroness Von Braunstein: An Exciting Adventure Story. Dorrance Publishing Company, 2016. ISBN 9781480938267
- Four Knights: A Novel of World War II. World Association Publishers, 2015. ISBN 9781633850958
- Top Secret: Escape From Iran. Author House, 2009. ISBN 9781438933580

== Personal life ==
Garland married Margaret "Peggy" Garland McCann on August 23, 1948, at Trinity Cathedral in Pittsburgh, Pennsylvania. Their reception was at the University Club. She was the daughter of John A. McCann of Pittsburgh, an attorney. Peggy predeceased Garland after 58 years of marriage. Their daughters were Margaret and Gayle.

In 1980, Garland was invited to visit Liberian President William Tolbert of Liberia. During their stay with the president and his wife in April 1980, the Garlands found themselves amid a coup where the president was executed. The Garlands fled Liberia during the cover of night.

Garland served on the board of directors of the U.S. Committee for Refugees and Immigrants. He was a member of St. James Episcopal Church in Richmond, Virginia. He was also a member of The Brook Club in New York City, the Duquesne Club, Fox Chapel Golf Club, and Rolling Rock Club. In 2005, Garland donated an athletic field to the Winchester Thurston School in memory of his wife who had attended the school.

In 2020, he died in Pittsburgh, Pennsylvania.
