= Christopher Michel =

American photographer, entrepreneur, and investor

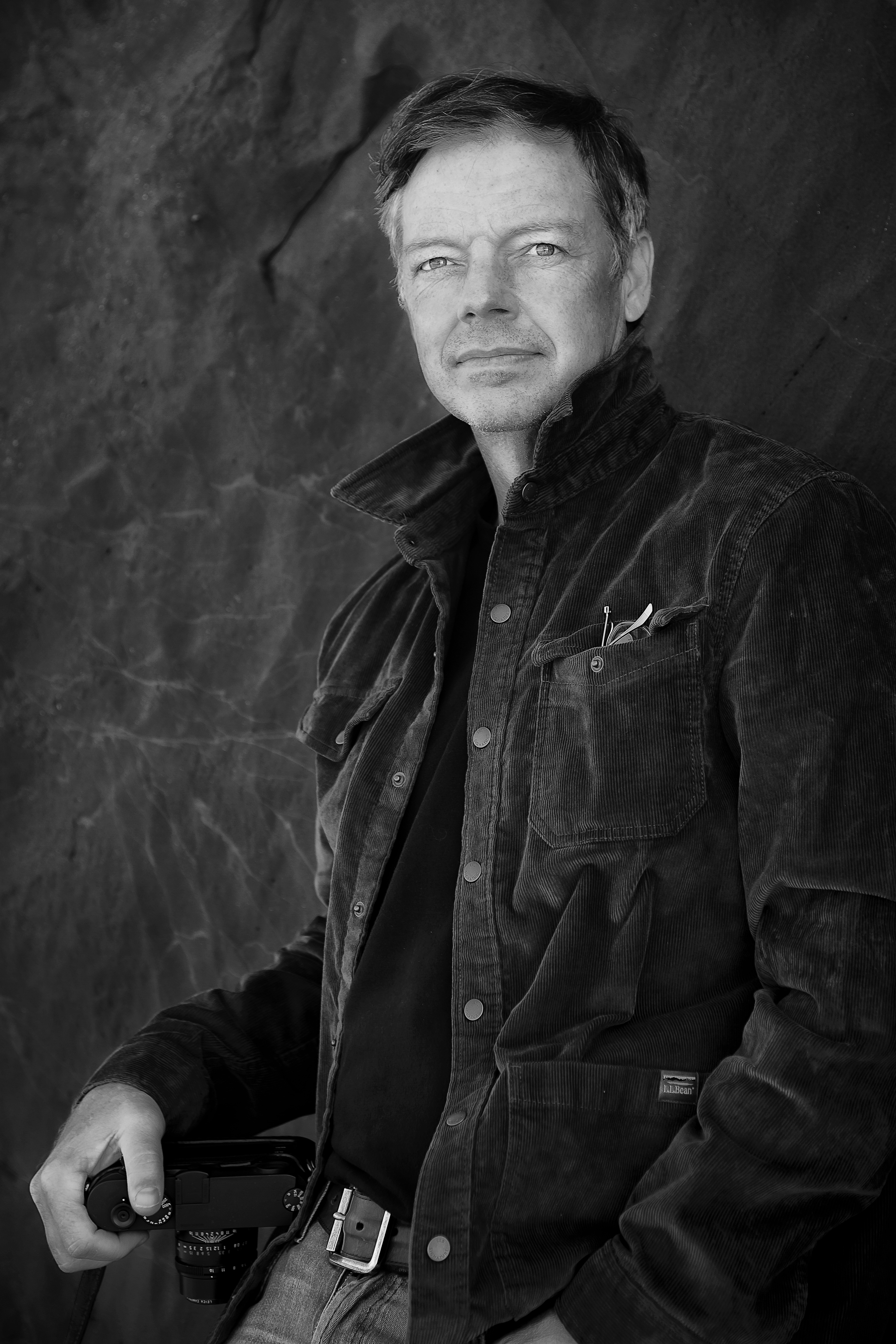
- Michel in San Francisco, in 2021
- Born: August 26, 1967 (age 59); San Francisco, California
- Education: University of Illinois; Harvard Business School (MBA)
- Occupations: Photographer; entrepreneur; lecturer; writer
- Years active: 2000–present
- Known for: Founder of Military.com and Affinity Labs
- Notable work: Military.com; several photographs

Christopher P. Michel (born August 26, 1967, in San Francisco) is an American photographer and entrepreneur, who founded Military.com. He is the current artist in residence at the National Academies.

== Early life and career ==
Michel attended the University of Illinois. He served as a flight officer in the US Navy, and later as a lieutenant commander in the reserves. He earned an MBA from Harvard Business School in 1998, and returned to the school as an entrepreneur-in-residence in 2010.

== Career ==
=== Business ===
In 2000, Michel founded Military.com, an early website providing news and practical information about the military for active service members, veterans, and their family members. It was acquired by Monster.com in 2004.

In 2006, he founded Affinity Labs, a company building social networking and career-building sites for professional communities. It was acquired by Monster.com in 2008. In 2010, his work with these companies was profiled in The Intelligent Entrepreneur.

In 2008 he started an early stage investment firm, Nautilus Ventures.

=== Writing and photography ===
From 2005 to 2009 he wrote The Military Advantage, a guide to veterans benefits. Starting in 2009, publication was taken over by the Naval Institute Press.

He is a nature and portrait photographer, producing collections for the Navy and for the National Academies of Sciences, Engineering, and Medicine, where he advised on climate communication. In 2021 he became their first artist in residence, producing a portrait series of American scientists. He has taught photography at the Esalen Institute and Santa Fe Workshops, and was an ambassador for Leica Camera.

==== Selected photographs ====
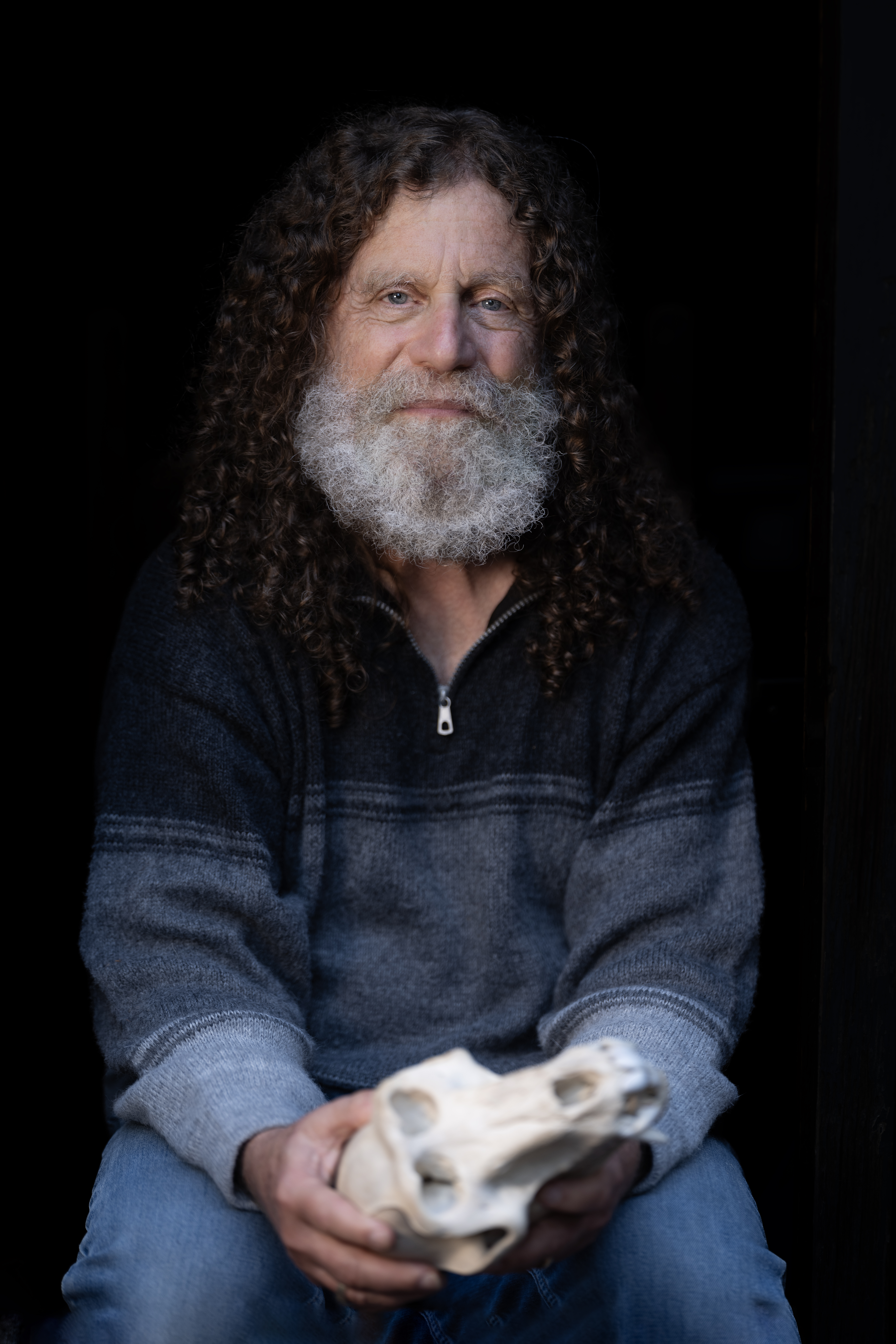
Robert Sapolsky (2023)

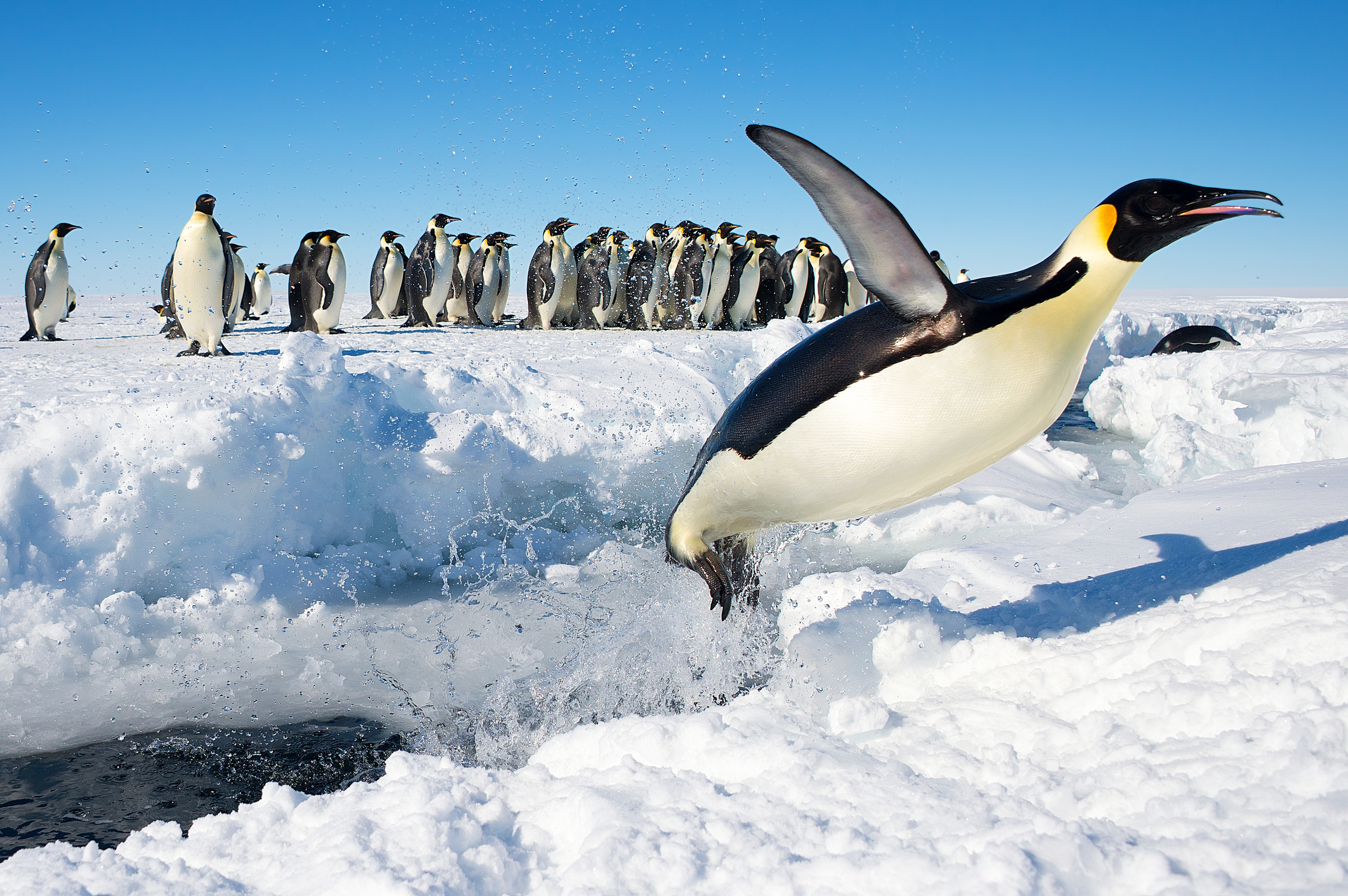
Emperor penguin in Antarctica (2013)

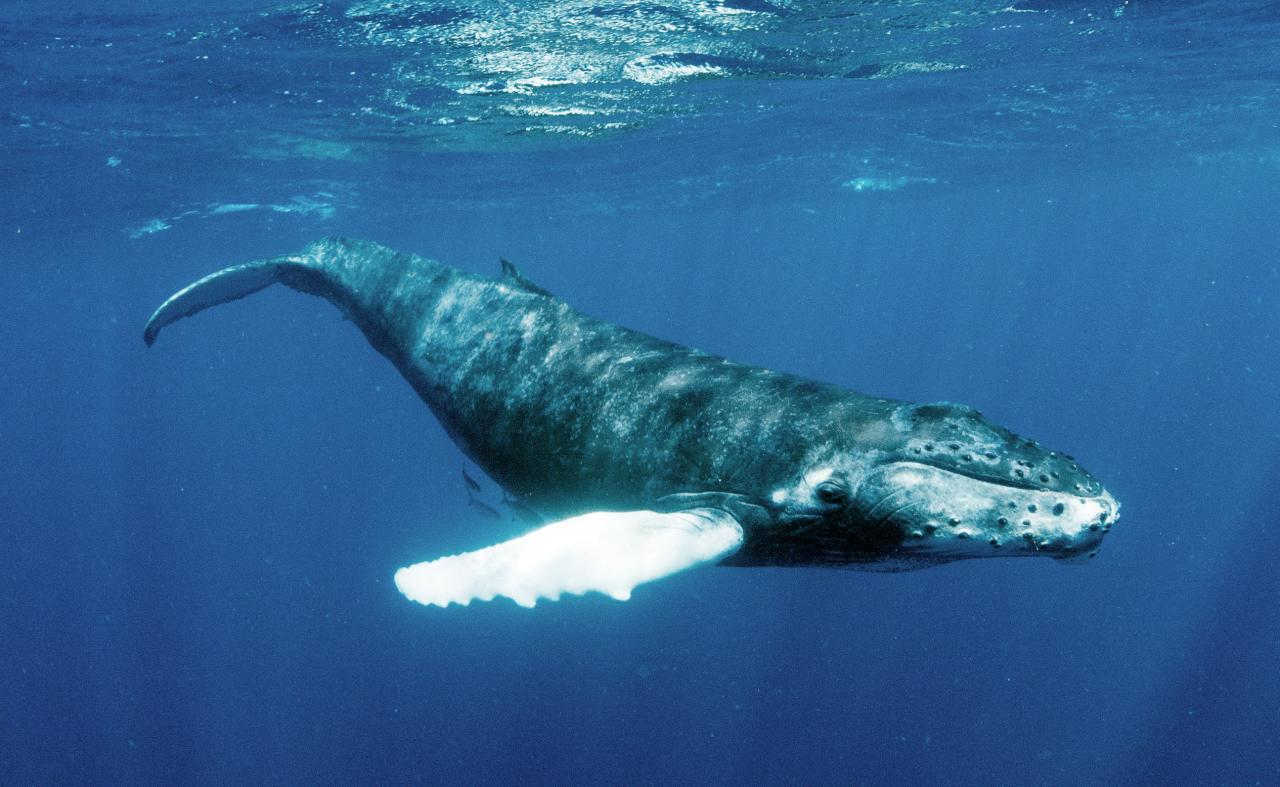
Humpback whale (2014)

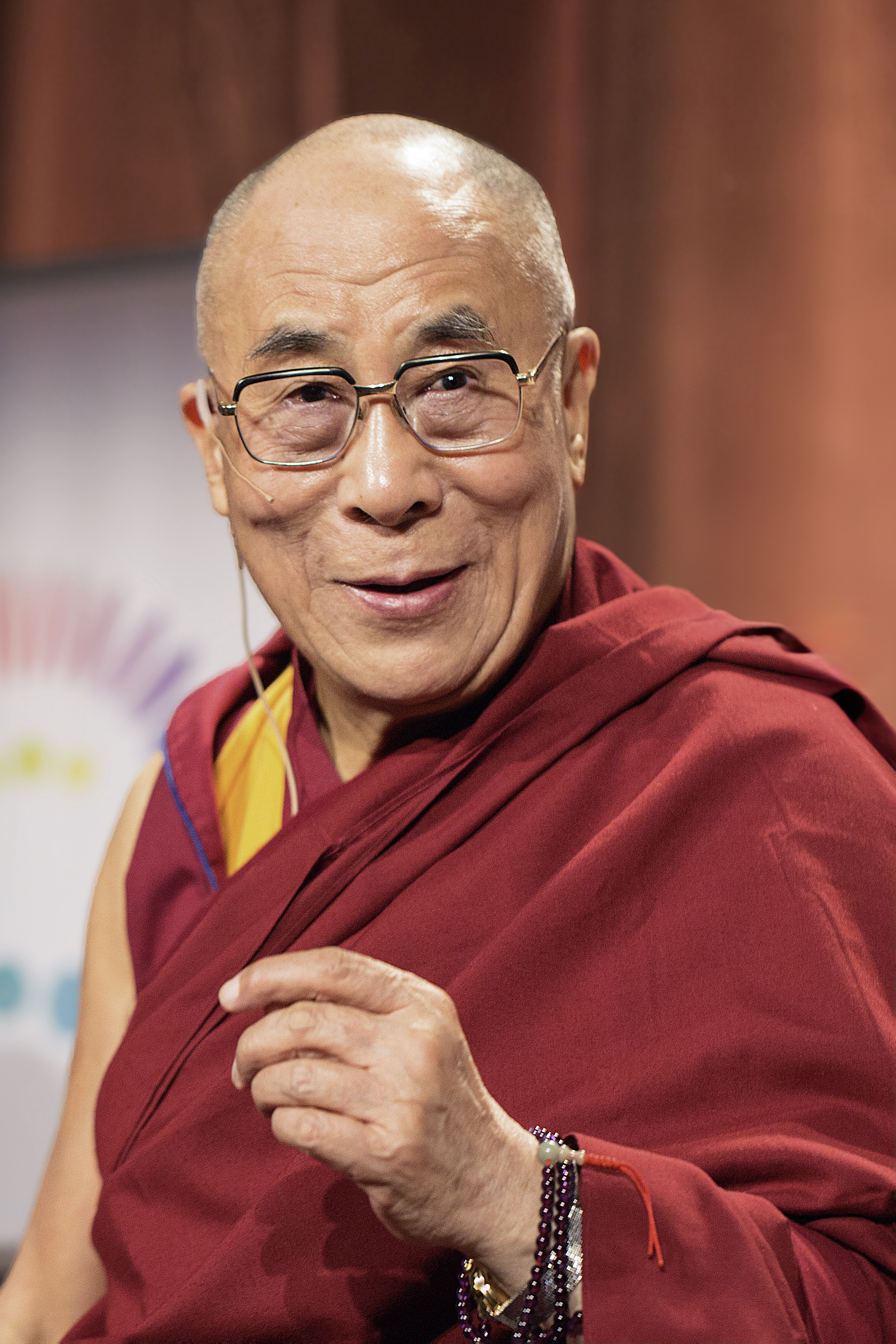
Dalai Lama (2012)

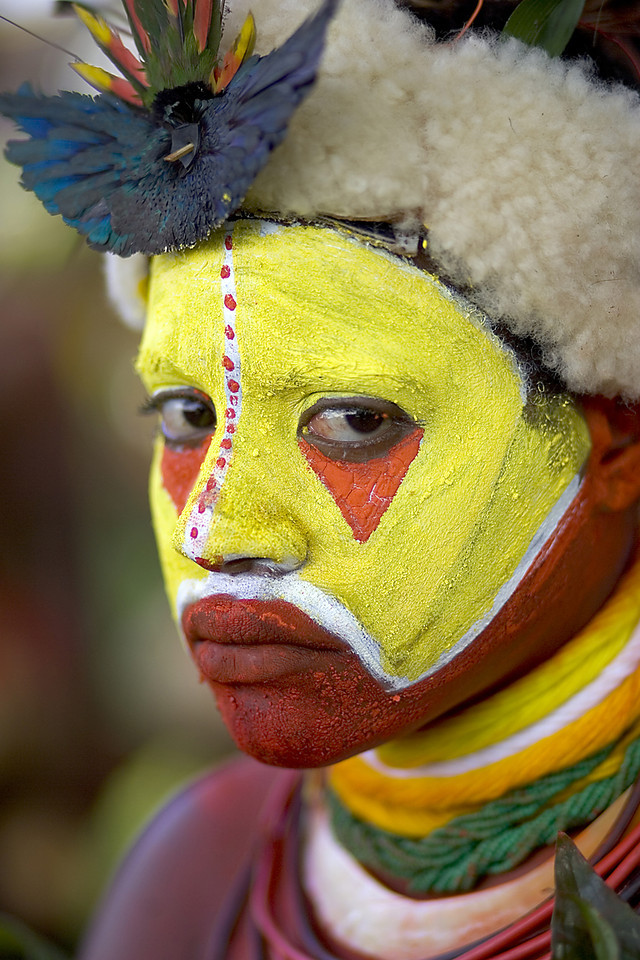
Woman in Papua New Guinea (2004)
