= Military.com =

American website and division of Valnet

- Website type: News Website
- Available in: English
- Headquarters: United States
- Owner: Valnet (2025–)
- Editor: Not applicable
- Website: www.military.com
- Launched: 1999; 27 years ago
- Current status: Active

Military.com is an American website that provides news and information about the United States military, service members, veterans, and their families as well as foreign policy and broader national security issues. Founded in 1999, the website was acquired by Valnet in 2025.

== History ==
Founded in 1999 by Christopher Michel and on air in 2000, its advisory board originally included two former members of the Joint Chiefs of Staff, as well as other academic and business leaders. In 2004, Monster Worldwide acquired Military.com for around $39.5 million.

Terry McCreary, a retired rear admiral, was president of the company from 2010 to 2014. He was succeeded by Greg Smith, a retired U.S. Navy rear admiral who served as vice-president at Monster Worldwide through August 2017.

In August 2016, Monster Worldwide was purchased by Ranstad Holding.

When Monster and CareerBuilder merged in 2024, funds managed by Apollo Global Management became the majority owner of the website. That year, the editorial staff had unionized, but hadn't been able to reach a contract with management.

After CareerBuilder + Monster filed for Chapter 11 bankruptcy on June 24, 2025, Military.com and the scholarship search site FastWeb were sold to Valnet for $27.25 million. Before the sale was finalized, the newsroom union wrote to the vice president of CareerBuilder + Monster's media division laying out concerns about Valnet's "documented patterns of gutting editorial teams, stripping outlets of their integrity, and transforming reputable publications into clickbait content farms."

After the sale was completed, several reporters were laid off or left for new jobs. Valnet hired freelancers to write articles, leaving the management of the site to Rony Arzoumanian, the company's head of mergers and acquisitions.

== Criticisms ==
Military.com has been criticized for taking advertising from for-profit colleges. Its former partner in lead generation, QuinStreet, previously settled with the U.S. government after being accused of preying on veterans.
