= Gary Rodkin =

American businessman

Gary Rodkin is the past CEO and President of ConAgra Foods, one of the largest food processing companies in North America. Rodkin was formerly the CEO and president of the North America division of PepsiCo from 1995 to 2005, and still is a special consultant through his exit agreement with the company.

On August 12, 2014, Rodkin announced that he would be retiring as CEO in 2015.

== Education ==
Rodkin has a Bachelor's degree in Economics from Rutgers University and an M.B.A. from the Harvard Graduate School of Business Administration.

== Career ==
Early in his career, Rodkin worked at General Mills, Inc., in a variety of marketing and general management roles, taking a key role in many of the successes of the firm’s leading brands, such as Betty Crocker and Cheerios. In 1995, Rodkin joined Tropicana Products, Inc. and became chief executive in August 1998.

From 2003 to 2005, Rodkin was Chairman and CEO of PepsiCo Beverages and Foods North America. He was also CEO and President at various times for: Pepsi-Cola North America, Pepsico, Inc. and PepsiCo Beverages and Foods North America. He has been an Independent Director at the United Industries Corporation since 2002, and a Director at Avon Products between 2007 and 2016.

While CEO of ConAgra Foods in 2009, Gary M. Rodkin earned a total compensation of $5,858,677, which included a base salary of $1,019,231, a cash bonus of $1,100,000, stocks granted of $2,126,000, options granted of $1,425,850, and other compensation totaling $187,596.

After leaving ConAgra Foods, in July 2015 he took on the role of Independent Director for the Simon Property Group

== Charitable endeavors ==
Rodkin is the chairman of Boys Town, the Prosper Omaha economic development campaign established by the Omaha Chamber of Commerce and Chairman of the Father Flanagan’s Boys’ Home Board of Trustees. He has also been Chairman of the Grocery Manufacturers Association since 2011. Gary and Barbara Rodkin donated $15 million to Rutgers University in 2018 to build the Gary and Barbara Rodkin Center for Academic Success to support the academic achievements of Rutgers' approximately 700 student-athletes. This facility houses the Men's and Women's soccer teams, as well as the Men's and Women's lacrosse teams. This facility also has a large academic learning center for all student-athletes to use.

== Recognition ==
Rodkin was listed as Number 250 on Forbes' Top CEO Compensation for 2011. He received the FMI Albers Award for Business Collaboration in 2015.
