= Randy Haykin =

- Born: Brooklyn, New York, US
- Education: Brown University; Harvard University
- Occupations: Outlook Ventures - Founder & Managing Director; Apple Inc. Global Multimedia Program Manager; Yahoo! Vice President marketing & sales Viacom/Paramount, Director of Business Development
- Years active: 1990s–present
- Board member of: Reply Inc., Digital Chocolate; Embee Corp, LesConcierges

Randy Haykin (born in Brooklyn, New York) is an entrepreneur, angel investor, venture capitalist and philanthropist who lives in the San Francisco Bay Area. Haykin founded and runs The Gratitude Network, a 501c3 not-for-profit that provides coaching services to social entrepreneurs around the world.

Founded in 2012, The Gratitude Network is a global accelerator for social impact. Gratitude has worked with nearly 150 social entrepreneurs (both for-profit and not-for-profit) around the world (60+ countries) in a "scale-up" mode—they want to accelerate their growth and reach sustainability. Gratitude's programs include coaching, expert advising, an annual event (The Leadership Summit), and ongoing webinars on leadership. In 2021, Haykin was the national recipient of a silver Jefferson Award as a recognized community leader "Silicon Valley Venture Capitalist Teaches Others to Give With Gratitude"

In 1997, Haykin is a co-founded Outlook Ventures, which invested in over 30 growth-stage internet and software companies technology companies over a ten-year span. Haykin's "street training" came from executive roles at IBM, Apple, Paramount. Starting in 1993, Haykin joined a series of technology start-ups and held senior sales and marketing positions at Yahoo, Electric Minds and NetChannel.

Haykin is a faculty member at the University of California, Berkeley Haas School of Business and visiting faculty of the University of Cambridge Judge Business School.

== Education ==
He graduated in 1985 from Brown University, where he received a Bachelor of Arts degree in organizational behavior and management, and in 1988 from Harvard Graduate School of Business Administration, where he obtained his Masters in Business Administration.

== Career ==
Haykin was the founding vice president of marketing and sales at Yahoo!, where he was responsible for building the company's marketing team, establishing agency relationships and generating initial business model and advertising sales for Yahoo. Haykin was also vice president of marketing at NetChannel, which was acquired by America Online in 1998. He also served as part of the core team that launched America Online's Greenhouse, a venture incubator.

In his five years at Apple Computer, Haykin was responsible for creating and launching the Apple Multimedia Program for developers as well as a line of retail multimedia and CD-ROM products. He was also responsible for the division's strategic relations, including the creation of the "New Media Center" program for higher education, with 10 other manufacturers and publishers. As the director of operations and business development at Viacom/Paramount's West Coast operations (the "Media Kitchen"), Haykin was in charge of online services and interactive team-building, corporate strategy and marketing.

He is founder of The Gratitude Network and The Intersection Event, a day-long event on innovation and its effect on the social issues. In 1995, he formed Interactive Minds, which was renamed Outlook Ventures, a software venture capital company. In 1996, he cofounded Electric Minds, a social space on the Web for current topics.

The Harvard Business Review covered Haykin's career in a December 8, 1997 magazine article titled "Randy Haykin: The Making of an Entrepreneur."

Haykin is an advisor and board member at Reply Inc., Digital Chocolate, Embee Corp, LesConcierges, and CrowdOptic, Inc.
