= David Nelms =

American businessman

David W. Nelms
- Born: 1961 (age 64–65)
- Education: University of Florida; Harvard University
- Years active: 1991–Present
- Employer: Discover Financial
- Known for: CEO of Discover Financial (98–18)
- Title: Chairman
- Term: 2009–
- Spouse: Daryl Nelms (m. 1981)

David W. Nelms (born 1961) is an American businessman and the former CEO of Discover Financial.

== Biography ==
David Nelms grew up in St. Petersburg, Florida and graduated from the University of Florida with a degree in mechanical engineering. Nelms went on to study at Harvard Business School and graduated with his MBA in 1987.

David Nelms was the Chief Executive Officer of Discover Financial from 2004 – September 30, 2018. Nelms was named chairman of the board in 2009 and as of October 1, 2018, was the Executive Chair of the board of directors. He joined Discover as president and COO in 1998. From 1991-1998, Nelms served as an executive for MBNA. From 1990 to 1991, he worked for Progressive Insurance as a senior product manager. From 1986 to 1990, he was a management consultant at Bain & Company. Before attending Harvard Business School, Nelms was an assembly line supervisor at General Electric.

Nelms served on the Board of Directors for the Federal Reserve Bank of Chicago as chair of the board of directors from 2018 until 2020.

As of 2022, he serves as the non-executive chair of the board of directors of the CDW Corporation.

Nelms and his wife, Daryl Nelms, married in 1981. They have three sons.
