= Shikhar Ghosh =

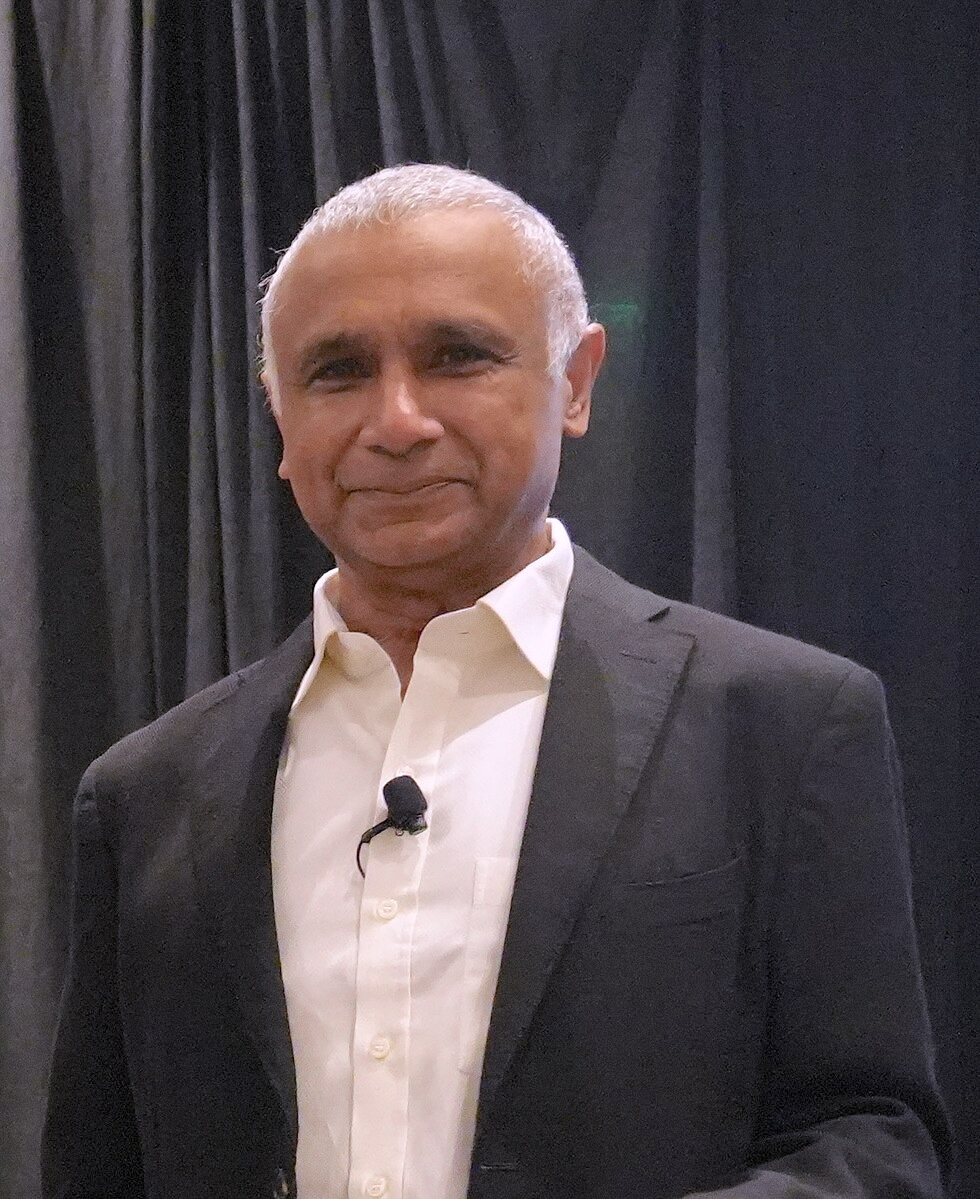
Ghosh at SXSW 2025

Shikhar Ghosh is the MBA Class of 1961 Senior Lecturer in the Entrepreneurial Management Unit at the Harvard Business School. He teaches an MBA course called The Entrepreneurial Manager. Shikhar has been an entrepreneur for the last 20 years. He has been the founder and CEO or chairman of eight technology-based entrepreneurial companies and was the past Chairman of the Massachusetts Technology Leadership Council and The Indus Entrepreneurs - 2 leading entrepreneurial organizations. He was selected by BusinessWeek as one of the best Entrepreneurs in the US, Forbes as one of the ‘Masters of the Internet Universe’ and Fortune as the CEO of one of the 10 most innovative companies in the US. Companies he founded were selected as both the ‘hottest’ and ‘coolest’ emerging companies by business publications.

== Early life ==
Shikhar received his undergraduate degree from the University of Bombay. Subsequently, he received his MBA from the Harvard Business School in 1980.

== Career ==
Shikhar joined the Boston Consulting Group in 1980 after completing his MBA. At BCG he focused on organization and innovation in large organization. He was elected a worldwide partner of the firm in 1987. Shikhar left BCG in 1988 to become CEO of Appex, an early-stage venture backed company that built the inter-carrier infrastructure for the US mobile phone industry. Appex provided centralized services that enabled independent mobile carriers to operate as a single seamless network. Appex's services included call forwarding across carriers, fraud prevention services, billing and customer service. Appex was bought by EDS in 1990. By the time Shikhar left in 1993, Appex's revenues exceeded $100m with an order backlog of over $1 billion. It was selected by BusinessWeek as the fastest-growing private company in the US.

Shikhar founded Open Market in 1993. Open Market was one of the pioneering companies in the commercialization of the Internet. It built the first commercial infrastructure for enabling secure commerce on the Internet and provided the software and services that enabled companies like Time Warner and AT&T to offer their services on the Internet. Open Market was one of the first internet companies to go public.

Subsequent to his departure from Open Market, Shikhar has served as founder, CEO, or chairman of numerous enterprises within the wireless, payment, Internet marketing, online retailing, and AI sectors.

== Works ==
=== Book chapters ===
- Ghosh, Shikhar and Ramana Nanda. "Venture Capital Investment in the Clean Energy Sector." In America's Energy Innovation Problem [working title], edited by Richard Lester, forthcoming

=== Published papers ===
- Ghosh, Shikhar, and Stephanie van Sice. "Indica." Harvard Business School Case 810–130.
- Ghosh, Shikhar, and Thomas R. Eisenmann. "Skyhook Wireless." Harvard Business School Case 809–119.
