= Monk-e-Mail =

Promotional Website

- Website type: E-card
- Available in: English
- Owner: CareerBuilder
- Website: careerbuilder.com/monk-e-mail
- Commercial: Yes
- Registration: No
- Launched: January 25, 2006; 20 years ago
- Current status: Active at Oddcast's site

Monk-e-Mail is an E-card website created by Oddcast and Cramer-Krasselt as a promotional tool for CareerBuilder's "Working with Monkeys" Super Bowl advertisement campaign in 2006. The website allows the user to create a message featuring an animated anthropomorphic monkey (a "monk-e-mail"), with customizability in regard to the type of monkey, its accessories, clothing, hair, and background. The program originally only had an email feature, but abilities to send messages to social media accounts were added in updates.

CareerBuilder launched Monk-e-Mail on January 25, 2006, 12 days before the Super Bowl, with a zero-dollar marketing budget; 230,000 users visited the site in its first week, and more than two million monk-e-mails were sent as of a week after the game. The site's popularity was long-lived; it peaked in monthly site visits in April 2006, and as of 2010, 20% of all the site's unique hits were after 2008. The site reached its 100 millionth sent monk-e-mail in 2007 and was at 160 million by January 2011.

Monk-e-Mail has been critically well-received, with marketing experts attributing its huge fanfare to its user-friendliness and custom features. In 2007, it won a Webby Award for Viral Marketing. CareerBuilder's brand awareness and the amount of visits to its website grew strongly ever since Monk-e-Mail's launch, which the staff of the company have attributed to the attention towards the microsite. CareerBuilder, in reviving the "Talking With Monkeys" campaign for the 2011 Super Bowl, released a new version of Monk-e-Mail, Monk-e-Mail 2.0, on January 31, 2011.

== 2006–2010: Monk-e-Mail 1.0 ==
=== Background ===
The company CareerBuilder garnered its first footing into advertisements for Super Bowl events in 2005 with three spots created by Cramer-Krasselt for a campaign named "Working with Monkeys"; all of them feature a man having to labor with rambunctious monkeys, with the pitch being to go to CareerBuilder.com to find a better job. CareerBuilder users increased by 50% days after the original airing of the ads, and consumer marketing vice president Richard Castellini claimed to have recouped the amount of money he purchased on them in three weeks. In next year's Super Bowl event, CareerBuilder bought two more ads in the same vein and promoted them with Monk-e-Mail, a site that launched twelve days before the game on January 25, 2006. No money was put into the marketing of Monk-e-Mail, which involved no more than CareerBuilder sending the site to all of its approximately-1,800 employees and putting a banner at the bottom of its official site.

=== Program ===
When the application is opened, a caricatured monkey states, "Welcome to Monk-e-Mail. You got something to say, I gotta nap to take, So let's get going."

The user is shown three chimpanzees to choose from, named "The Boss", "The Co-worker", and "The Receptionist". The Boss is a male monkey with grey fur and a heavy stature. The Co-worker is also a male, but his fur is black and he has a slightly smaller build than "The Boss". The Receptionist is the only female monkey and is smaller than the other two chimpanzees. Users can stylize the apes by choosing their headgear, clothes, glasses, background and other items. To add audio, users can use text-to-speech functionality with one of four voices, or record their own voice using a microphone or telephone. When recording by telephone, users may record up to one minute of speech; but when using a microphone, users may only record up to 20 seconds. Messages generated using this application may be emailed to others or posted on Facebook.

On October 24, 2007, the ability to send messages to mobile devices for AT&T, Verizon, and Sprint was added.

=== Critical reception ===
Upon the site's launch, critics claimed Monk-e-Mail to be the "best thing since Google Earth" and "history's third-greatest human achievement, after only democracy and Velcro." The site garnered strong praise from BBDO CEO Andrew Robertson, who stated that he "spent about an hour and a half the first morning I found it creating and sending messages." As Robertson elaborated, "The ability to create ads that engage like that isn't about being big or being small, it's about being able to do good work."

Summarizing the appeal of Monk-e-mail, Nick Chordas of The Columbus Dispatch wrote, "There's nothing funnier than a monkey dressed like a human." Ad Age featured it as an "Editor's Pick." Reviewing the 2006 Super Bowl ads, Ad Age journalist Richard Ho claimed Monk-e-mail "puts [CareerBuilder's campaign] over the top. We've seen the idea before in the excellent Comcastic Puppets site, but, well, this has chimps. Enough said." In her year-end list of "'06 picks," another writer of the publication, Ann-Christine Diaz, included avatar programs such as Monk-e-mail as the "most frequented time wasters." The Dayton Daily News, in a rave review, called it "hilarious, delightful and, if you're not careful, highly addictive;" and concluded that "it's sure to amuse and entertain both you and all the countless people you send it out to. Even if you're careful about e-mail forwards, this is one that's hard to resist."

A writer for the Key West Citizen stated, "for someone as easily entertained as myself, it is a riot. What this type of service is doing on a Web site designed to further one's career is beyond me, but it is pretty darn funny." The Roanoke Times' Beth Macy, a writer who normally hated looking through her e-mail, praised it as "waaaay funnier than crazy pictures of my second cousin's cat." Richard A. Marini of the San Antonio Express-News called it "such a great time sink that if you play with it at work long enough you may just find yourself back in the job market;" he reported his workplace coming "to a virtual standstill one afternoon recently as hilarious messages zipped back and forth from one computer to another" and his teenage daughters enjoying the software.

=== Popularity ===
In 2010, The New York Times summarized the importance of Monk-e-Mail in advertising history: "Although the campaign that inspired the application is long over, Monk-e-mail lives on in a demonstration of the staying power of ads that consumers pass along voluntarily."

In its first week, Monk-e-mail attracted around 230,000 unique visits, and more than 50% of e-mail accounts that received a monk-e-mail sent it to another user. A week after the game, the total amount of sent monk-e-mails skyrocketed to more than two million. By the site's eighth month live, it had totaled 9.1 million visits, peaking in monthly site visits in April 2006 when it garnered 4.4 million. Also in April, Google searches of Monk-e-Mail would return more than 84,600 pages linking to the site.

CareerBuilder.com's traffic grew by 25% within months of Monk-e-Mail's launch, making it the top-visited career website worldwide. It reached 23 million visits in October 2006, a record for the company; both Oddcast and CareerBuilder's vice president of consumer marketing, Richard Castellini, attributed the success to Monk-e-Mail. Cynthia McIntyre, senior director of advertising for CareerBuilder, claimed that, in addition to increasing awareness of the brand, Monk-e-Mail also helped the company's sales team obtain clients.

By 2010, around 20 percent of all of the site's 55 million visits were after 2008, 818,000 of them garnered in the first quarter of 2010; and CareerBuilder revealed "hundreds of thousands of visits tallied each quarter" still in January 2011. The amount of messages sent went from 44 million in July 2006 to 70 million in November 2006. It had reached its 100 millionth message by December 2007, going up to 160 million in 2011. In January 2007, sent Monk-e-mail messages were played 83 million times, and users were spending an average of six minutes on the site.

Oddcast and other marketing experts attributed Monk-e-Mail's wide appeal to its ease-of-use and customizability. Marketing Sherpa claimed that, when compared to previous E-card sites, "it's the best we've ever seen for this type of campaign because everything's included above the fold on just one page. You don't have to click through a screen by screen process to send an e-card. Shiffman added that "so many people could relate to being frustrated with the people they work with (the monkeys)."

=== Awards ===
Monk-e-Mail won two Adweek Buzz Awards for Best Internet Campaign and Best Overall Campaign; and a Webby Award in the Viral Marketing category.

== 2011: Monk-e-Mail 2.0 ==
While CareerBuilder continued to update the original Monk-e-Mail website, it stopped producing and airing Super Bowl advertisements about chimps at work from 2007 until 2011. With the continued popularity of Monk-e-Mail years after its initial release and CareerBuilder's later Super Bowl ads being less successful, the company decided to revive the Chimpanzee campaign in 2011 with more ads for the that year's Super Bowl plus a new version of Monk-e-Mail, "Monk-e-Mail 2.0," that was released on January 31, 2011.
