= 2016 Striping Technology 350 =

21st race of the 2016 NASCAR Camping World Truck Series

Race details
- Race 21 of 23 of the 2016 NASCAR Camping World Truck Series
- Date: November 4, 2016
- Official name: 18th Annual Striping Technology 350
- Location: Texas Motor Speedway, Fort Worth, Texas
- Course: Permanent racing facility
- Course length: 1.5 miles (2.4 km)
- Distance: 147 laps, 220 mi (354 km)
- Scheduled distance: 147 laps, 220 mi (354 km)
- Average speed: 148.291 mph (238.651 km/h)

Pole position
Driver	Spencer Gallagher	GMS Racing
- Time: 29.949

Most laps led
Driver	Spencer Gallagher	GMS Racing
- Laps: 88

Winner
No. 21	Johnny Sauter	GMS Racing

Television in the United States
- Network: FS1
- Announcers: Vince Welch, Phil Parsons, and Michael Waltrip

Radio in the United States
- Radio: MRN

The 2016 Striping Technology 350 was the 21st stock car race of the 2016 NASCAR Camping World Truck Series, the second race of the Round of 6, and the 18th iteration of the event. The race was held on Friday, November 4, 2016, in Fort Worth, Texas, at Texas Motor Speedway, a 1.5-mile (2.4 km) permanent tri-oval shaped speedway. The race took the scheduled 147 laps to complete. Johnny Sauter, driving for GMS Racing, made a pass on Matt Crafton for the win with 2 laps to go, and earned his 13th career NASCAR Camping World Truck Series win, and his third of the season. Spencer Gallagher mainly dominated the race, leading 88 laps. To fill out the podium, Daniel Hemric, driving for Brad Keselowski Racing, would finish in 3rd, respectively.

== Background ==
The layout of Texas Motor Speedway, the venue where the race was held.

Texas Motor Speedway is a speedway located in the northernmost portion of the US city of Fort Worth, Texas – the portion located in Denton County, Texas. The reconfigured track measures 1.500 mi (2.414 km) with banked 20° in turns 1 and 2 and banked 24° in turns 3 and 4. Texas Motor Speedway is a quad-oval design, where the front straightaway juts outward slightly. The track layout is similar to Atlanta Motor Speedway and Charlotte Motor Speedway. The track is owned by Speedway Motorsports, Inc. Nicknamed "The Great American Speedway“ the racetrack facility is one of the largest motorsports venues in the world capable of hosting crowds in excess of 200,000 spectators.

=== Entry list ===
- (R) denotes rookie driver.
- (i) denotes driver who is ineligible for series driver points.

#	Driver	Team	Make	Sponsor
00	Cole Custer (R)	JR Motorsports	Chevrolet	Haas Automation
1	Jennifer Jo Cobb	Jennifer Jo Cobb Racing	Chevrolet	Grimes Irrigation & Construction
02	Tyler Young	Young's Motorsports	Chevrolet	Randco, Young's Building Systems
4	Christopher Bell (R)	Kyle Busch Motorsports	Toyota	JBL
05	Cody Coughlin (R)	Athenian Motorsports	Chevrolet	Zaxby's, Jegs High Performance
07	Matt Mills	SS-Green Light Racing	Chevrolet	Thompson Electric
8	John Hunter Nemechek	NEMCO Motorsports	Chevrolet	Death Wish Coffee
9	William Byron (R)	Kyle Busch Motorsports	Toyota	Liberty University
10	Ryan Ellis (i)	Jennifer Jo Cobb Racing	Chevrolet	Grimes Irrigation & Construction
11	Matt Tifft (R)	Red Horse Racing	Toyota	Waste Connections, Brain Gear
13	Cameron Hayley	ThorSport Racing	Toyota	Ride TV, Cabinets by Hayley
17	Timothy Peters	Red Horse Racing	Toyota	Red Horse Racing
19	Daniel Hemric	Brad Keselowski Racing	Ford	Blue Gate Bank
20	Austin Hill	Austin Hill Racing	Ford	Lawless Jerky, Alien Gear Holsters
21	Johnny Sauter	GMS Racing	Chevrolet	Allegiant Travel Company
22	Austin Wayne Self (R)	AM Racing	Toyota	AM Technical Solutions
23	Spencer Gallagher	GMS Racing	Chevrolet	Allegiant Travel Company
24	Shane Lee	GMS Racing	Chevrolet	LeeBoy
29	Tyler Reddick	Brad Keselowski Racing	Ford	Cooper-Standard Automotive
33	Ben Kennedy	GMS Racing	Chevrolet	Jacob Companies
41	Ben Rhodes (R)	ThorSport Racing	Toyota	Alpha Energy Solutions
44	Tommy Joe Martins	Martins Motorsports	Chevrolet	Diamond Gusset Jeans, RPM Trailers
45	Casey Smith	Niece Motorsports	Chevrolet	Niece Equipment
49	Reed Sorenson (i)	Premium Motorsports	Chevrolet	Premium Motorsports
50	Travis Kvapil	MAKE Motorsports	Chevrolet	Willbros
51	Daniel Suárez (i)	Kyle Busch Motorsports	Toyota	Arris
63	Norm Benning	Norm Benning Racing	Chevrolet	Norm Benning Racing
66	Jordan Anderson	Bolen Motorsports	Chevrolet	Columbia SC – Famously Hot
71	Austin Dillon (i)	Ranier Racing with MDM	Chevrolet	Russell by HTPG
74	Mike Harmon (i)	Mike Harmon Racing	Chevrolet	Mike Harmon Racing
78	Tommy Regan	B. J. McLeod Motorsports	Chevrolet	American Tactical, Unique AR's
81	Ryan Truex	Hattori Racing Enterprises	Toyota	KOBE Toyopet
88	Matt Crafton	ThorSport Racing	Toyota	Damp Rid, Menards
97	Jesse Little	JJL Motorsports	Toyota	Carolina Nut Co.
98	Rico Abreu (R)	ThorSport Racing	Toyota	Safelite, Curb Records
Official entry list

== Practice ==
The first practice session was originally going to be held on Thursday, November 3, at 2:45 pm CST, but was postponed until Friday, November 4, due to inclement weather. The final practice session would be cancelled. Christopher Bell, driving for Kyle Busch Motorsports, would set the fastest time in the session, with a lap of 29.580, and an average speed of 182.556 mph (293.795 km/h).

Pos.	#	Driver	Team	Make	Time	Speed
1	4	Christopher Bell (R)	Kyle Busch Motorsports	Toyota	29.580	182.556
2	29	Tyler Reddick	Brad Keselowski Racing	Ford	29.694	181.855
3	11	Matt Tifft (R)	Red Horse Racing	Toyota	29.721	181.690
Full practice results

== Qualifying ==
Qualifying was held on Friday, November 4, at 2:45 pm CST. Since Texas Motor Speedway is at least 1.5 miles (2.4 km) in length, the qualifying system was a single car, single lap, two round system where in the first round, everyone would set a time to determine positions 13–32. Then, the fastest 12 qualifiers would move on to the second round to determine positions 1–12.

Spencer Gallagher, driving for GMS Racing, would score the pole for the race, with a lap of 29.949, and an average speed of 180.307 mph (290.176 km/h) in the second round.

Tommy Regan, Mike Harmon, and Ryan Ellis would fail to qualify.

=== Full qualifying results ===
Pos.	#	Driver	Team	Make	Time (R1)	Speed (R1)	Time (R2)	Speed (R2)
1	23	Spencer Gallagher	GMS Racing	Chevrolet	29.996	180.024	29.949	180.307
2	19	Daniel Hemric	Brad Keselowski Racing	Ford	30.130	179.223	29.985	180.090
3	9	William Byron (R)	Kyle Busch Motorsports	Toyota	30.136	179.188	30.011	179.934
4	11	Matt Tifft (R)	Red Horse Racing	Toyota	30.138	179.176	30.012	179.928
5	29	Tyler Reddick	Brad Keselowski Racing	Ford	30.054	179.677	30.020	179.880
6	17	Timothy Peters	Red Horse Racing	Toyota	30.093	179.444	30.042	179.748
7	88	Matt Crafton	ThorSport Racing	Toyota	30.115	179.313	30.055	179.671
8	41	Ben Rhodes (R)	ThorSport Racing	Toyota	30.152	179.093	30.097	179.420
9	4	Christopher Bell (R)	Kyle Busch Motorsports	Toyota	30.143	179.146	30.103	179.384
10	51	Daniel Suárez (i)	Kyle Busch Motorsports	Toyota	30.163	179.027	30.109	179.348
11	05	Cody Coughlin (R)	Athenian Motorsports	Chevrolet	30.101	179.396	30.162	179.033
12	00	Cole Custer (R)	JR Motorsports	Chevrolet	30.165	179.015	30.187	178.885
Eliminated in Round 1
13	97	Jesse Little	JJL Motorsports	Toyota	30.175	178.956	–	–
14	33	Ben Kennedy	GMS Racing	Chevrolet	30.177	178.944	–	–
15	98	Rico Abreu (R)	ThorSport Racing	Toyota	30.180	178.926	–	–
16	21	Johnny Sauter	GMS Racing	Chevrolet	30.258	178.465	–	–
17	13	Cameron Hayley	ThorSport Racing	Toyota	30.266	178.418	–	–
18	81	Ryan Truex	Hattori Racing Enterprises	Toyota	30.300	178.218	–	–
19	8	John Hunter Nemechek	NEMCO Motorsports	Chevrolet	30.312	178.147	–	–
20	20	Austin Hill	Austin Hill Racing	Ford	30.313	178.141	–	–
21	24	Shane Lee	GMS Racing	Chevrolet	30.339	177.989	–	–
22	71	Austin Dillon (i)	Ranier Racing with MDM	Chevrolet	30.446	177.363	–	–
23	02	Tyler Young	Young's Motorsports	Chevrolet	30.610	176.413	–	–
24	45	Casey Smith	Niece Motorsports	Chevrolet	30.670	176.068	–	–
25	49	Reed Sorenson (i)	Premium Motorsports	Chevrolet	30.704	175.873	–	–
26	44	Tommy Joe Martins	Martins Motorsports	Chevrolet	30.711	175.833	–	–
27	66	Jordan Anderson	Bolen Motorsports	Chevrolet	30.731	175.718	–	–
Qualified by owner's points
28	07	Matt Mills	SS-Green Light Racing	Chevrolet	30.973	174.345	–	–
29	50	Travis Kvapil	MAKE Motorsports	Chevrolet	31.101	173.628	–	–
30	22	Austin Wayne Self (R)	AM Racing	Toyota	31.115	173.550	–	–
31	63	Norm Benning	Norm Benning Racing	Chevrolet	31.665	170.535	–	–
32	1	Jennifer Jo Cobb	Jennifer Jo Cobb Racing	Chevrolet	32.273	167.323	–	–
Failed to qualify
33	78	Tommy Regan	B. J. McLeod Motorsports	Chevrolet	31.315	172.441	–	–
34	74	Mike Harmon (i)	Mike Harmon Racing	Chevrolet	31.393	172.013	–	–
35	10	Ryan Ellis (i)	Jennifer Jo Cobb Racing	Chevrolet	31.707	170.309		
Official qualifying results
Official starting lineup

== Race results ==
Fin	St	#	Driver	Team	Make	Laps	Led	Status	Pts
1	16	21	Johnny Sauter	GMS Racing	Chevrolet	147	6	Running	36
2	7	88	Matt Crafton	ThorSport Racing	Toyota	147	15	Running	32
3	2	19	Daniel Hemric	Brad Keselowski Racing	Ford	147	38	Running	31
4	5	29	Tyler Reddick	Brad Keselowski Racing	Ford	147	0	Running	29
5	10	51	Daniel Suárez (i)	Kyle Busch Motorsports	Toyota	147	0	Running	0
6	3	9	William Byron (R)	Kyle Busch Motorsports	Toyota	147	0	Running	27
7	1	23	Spencer Gallagher	GMS Racing	Chevrolet	147	88	Running	28
8	22	71	Austin Dillon (i)	Ranier Racing with MDM	Chevrolet	147	0	Running	0
9	12	00	Cole Custer (R)	JR Motorsports	Chevrolet	147	0	Running	24
10	17	13	Cameron Hayley	ThorSport Racing	Toyota	147	0	Running	23
11	9	4	Christopher Bell (R)	Kyle Busch Motorsports	Toyota	147	0	Running	22
12	15	98	Rico Abreu (R)	ThorSport Racing	Toyota	147	0	Running	21
13	14	33	Ben Kennedy	GMS Racing	Chevrolet	147	0	Running	20
14	6	17	Timothy Peters	Red Horse Racing	Toyota	147	0	Running	19
15	8	41	Ben Rhodes (R)	ThorSport Racing	Toyota	147	0	Running	18
16	21	24	Shane Lee	GMS Racing	Chevrolet	147	0	Running	17
17	4	11	Matt Tifft (R)	Red Horse Racing	Toyota	147	0	Running	161
18	19	8	John Hunter Nemechek	NEMCO Motorsports	Chevrolet	146	0	Running	15
19	20	20	Austin Hill	Austin Hill Racing	Ford	145	0	Running	14
20	13	97	Jesse Little	JJL Motorsports	Toyota	145	0	Running	13
21	18	81	Ryan Truex	Hattori Racing Enterprises	Toyota	144	0	Running	12
22	30	22	Austin Wayne Self (R)	AM Racing	Toyota	144	0	Running	11
23	24	45	Casey Smith	Niece Motorsports	Chevrolet	144	0	Running	10
24	25	49	Reed Sorenson (i)	Premium Motorsports	Chevrolet	143	0	Vibration	0
25	27	66	Jordan Anderson	Bolen Motorsports	Chevrolet	143	0	Running	8
26	23	02	Tyler Young	Young's Motorsports	Chevrolet	143	0	Running	7
27	29	50	Travis Kvapil	MAKE Motorsports	Chevrolet	142	0	Running	6
28	11	05	Cody Coughlin (R)	Athenian Motorsports	Chevrolet	141	0	Running	5
29	28	07	Matt Mills	SS-Green Light Racing	Chevrolet	140	0	Running	4
30	32	1	Jennifer Jo Cobb	Jennifer Jo Cobb Racing	Chevrolet	138	0	Running	3
31	26	44	Tommy Joe Martins	Martins Motorsports	Chevrolet	61	0	Accident	2
32	31	63	Norm Benning	Norm Benning Racing	Chevrolet	22	0	Engine	1
Official race results

== Standings after the race ==
Drivers' Championship standings

	Pos	Driver	Points
	1	Johnny Sauter	3,072
2	2	William Byron	3,052 (−20)
1	3	Christopher Bell	3,051 (−21)
1	4	Matt Crafton	3,048 (−24)
2	5	Timothy Peters	3,047 (−25)
	6	Ben Kennedy	3,035 (−37)
	7	Daniel Hemric	2,115 (−957)
	8	John Hunter Nemechek	2,084 (−988)
Official driver's standings

- Note: Only the first 8 positions are included for the driver standings.

Previous race: 2016 Texas Roadhouse 200	NASCAR Camping World Truck Series; 2016 season	Next race: 2016 Lucas Oil 150
