= Oddcast (company) =

American online marketing company

- Founded: 1999
- Headquarters: New York City, United States
- Key people: Adi Sideman
- Website: oddcast.com

Oddcast is an online marketing company located in New York City and founded in 1999.

Its software, PhotoFace, takes an uploaded picture and turns it into a 3D face, then lets users manipulate its features. The company has used this in various marketing campaigns for numerous major corporations.

== History ==
The company was founded in 1999 by former Israeli army paratrooper and documentary filmmaker Adi Sideman.

== Accomplishments ==
For McDonald's in Europe, it created a promotion called “Avatarize yourself”, which encouraged people to go to a website and use a photograph of themselves to change into a Na'vi from the film Avatar.

The company worked with CareerBuilder to create Monk-e-Mail, which allows people to send messages with images of talking chimpanzees they can customize. Over 160 million messages have been sent.

Oddcast developed Ford's Theme Song-a-tron.

- Tide's Talking Stain
- Volkswagen's Babymaker
- 7-Eleven's BrainFreeze Laboratory, used to promote its Slurpee beverage.
- OfficeMax's Elfyourself.
