= Robert McGovern =

Robert McGovern may refer to:

- Robert M. McGovern (1928–1951), United States Army Officer and Medal of Honor recipient
- Robert McGovern (businessman), American businessman
