= Shawn James =

Shawn James may refer to:

- Shawn James (basketball)
- Shawn James (musician)

== See also ==
- Sean James, American activist and former football player
