= Death Wish Coffee =

American coffee company

Death Wish Coffee Co.
- Company type: Coffee Company
- Founded: 2012
- Founder: Mike Brown
- Headquarters: Saratoga Springs, New York
- Number of locations: 2 Offices
- Owner: Mike Brown
- Number of employees: 64
- Website: deathwishcoffee.com

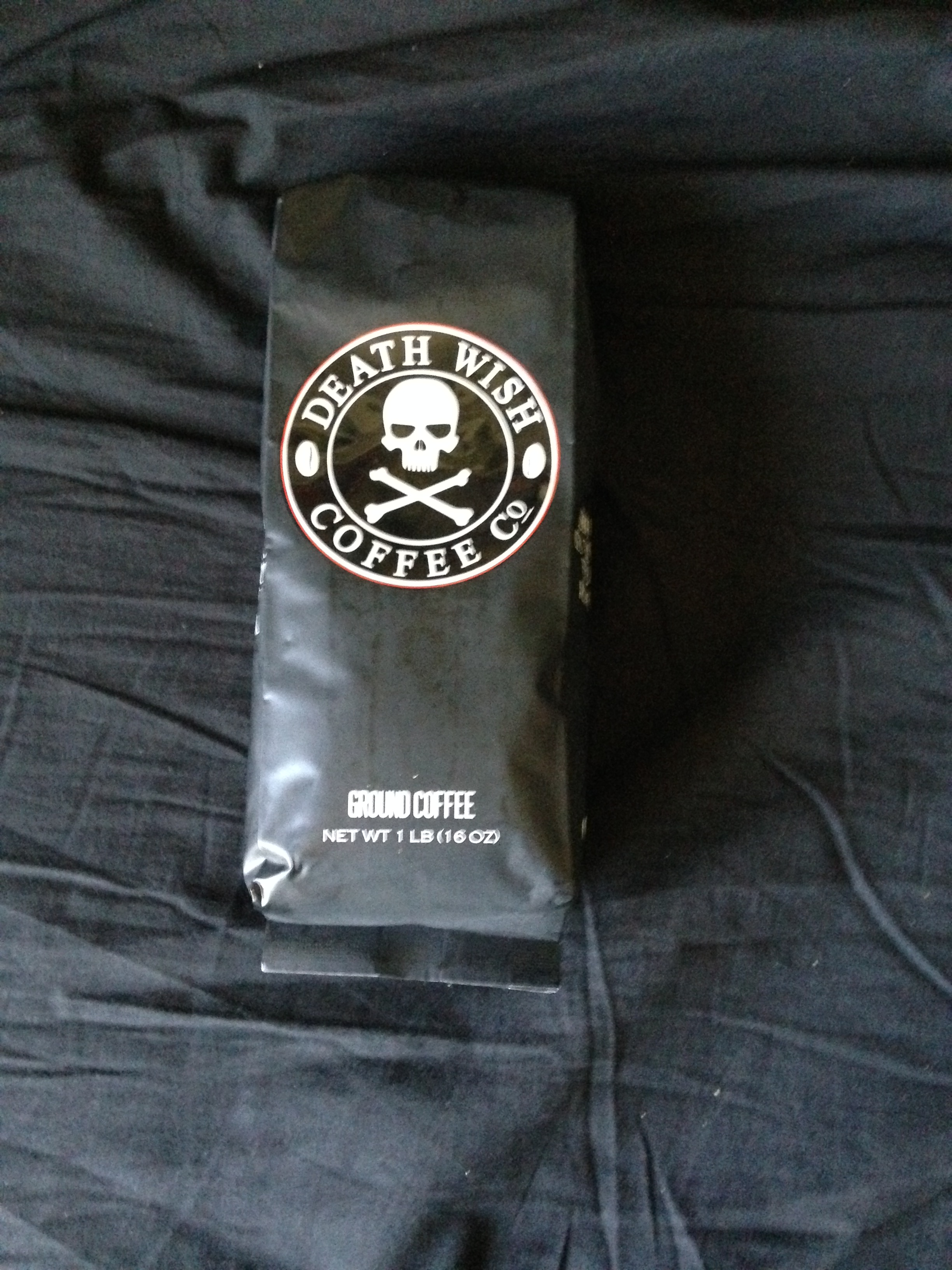
A bag of Death Wish Coffee

Death Wish Coffee is a coffee brand based in the United States. Their coffee is roasted in Round Lake, New York and sold online, through Amazon, and in grocery stores across the country. The coffee is a blend of robusta and arabica beans from India, Peru, and other countries throughout South and Central America.

Death Wish Coffee was introduced in 2012. The company was founded by Mike Brown in Saratoga Springs, New York, and is headquartered there.

== Awards and recognition ==
Death Wish Coffee gained publicity when it was chosen as the winner of Intuit QuickBooks' "Small Business, Big Game" competition in 2015, allowing it to have a Super Bowl commercial carried nationwide free of charge during Super Bowl 50.

== Recall ==
In September 2017, Death Wish Coffee voluntarily recalled its 11-ounce cans of Death Wish Nitro Cold Brew coffee. Concerns arose that their cold brewing process could allow the growth of Clostridium botulinum, the bacterium responsible for botulism. No illnesses were reported.
