= Strada Education Foundation =

American nonprofit organization

- Formerly: Strada Education Network
- Type: Nonprofit organization
- Industry: Education
- Headquarters: Indianapolis, Indiana
- Key people: Stephen Moret (CEO)
- Website: strada.org

Strada Education Foundation is an American nonprofit organization focused on strengthening connections between education and employment. The organization conducts research into what American adults value about postsecondary education, makes investments in companies with similar missions, and awards grants to organizations working to achieve the same goal (improving the paths between education and work). This includes grants for education and training programs at four-year universities and community colleges. Strada's headquarters is in Indianapolis, Indiana, and the nonprofit has an additional office in Washington, D.C.

== History ==
Before 2017, Strada Education Foundation was formerly known as United Student Aid Funds, and was a guarantor of student loans. In December 2016, the organization stopped operating in this area, offloading its guarantor business to Great Lakes Higher Education Corp. In March 2017, United Student Aid Funds changed its name to Strada Education Network.

By 2019, the nonprofit had acquired four organizations to help its mission:

- Council for Adult and Experiential Learning (CAEL): an organization that provides adult career advising and other services
- Education at Work: provides paid work opportunities for college students
- InsideTrack: provides student coaching services
- Roadtrip Nation: a program and website featuring interviews from a wide range of people with the purpose of providing career advice

The State Opportunity Index was released in April 2024. The report finds that states excel in affordability and outcome tracking but lag in career coaching, work-based learning, and employer alignment. It urges better collaboration to improve job outcomes, highlighting that internships and coaching reduce underemployment. Experts hope it drives policy changes for workforce readiness.

In 2021, the Strada Education Network formed a partnership with 28 historically Black colleges and universities (HBCUs). The partnership focuses on leadership development, scholarships, and financial support to defray the costs of internships, and building professional networks to help students begin their careers or explore graduate school options. Strada funded the partnership with a $25 million grant.

Also in 2021, Strada hired Stephen Moret, who was credited with landing Amazon's HQ2 in Northern Virginia and the Washington D.C. area was hired as the new CEO.

In 2022, Strada and the Taskforce on Higher Education and Opportunity awarded grants to 15 colleges and universities to fund projects to improve post-graduation outcomes for students from underrepresented racial and ethnic backgrounds; students who are low-income or first-generation; and students who have transferred or are working while at school. The different projects included expanding career services and support, incorporating career preparation into curricula, and improving student job outcomes. The University of Texas System used its grant to pilot a program to add micro credentials focused on workplace skills into a four-year curriculum.

Later in 2022, Strada presented ten community colleges with grants through the Strada Education Network's Employer and Community College Partnership Challenge. This challenge supports employer partnerships that connect students with in-demand employment opportunities to strengthen regional economies.

In 2023, Strada Education Network was rebranded as Strada Education Foundation. In December 2023, Techstars announced it would relaunch the Techstars Workforce Development Accelerator. Strada Education Foundation returned as a partner to the program, and World Education Services joined as a new partner [20] [21]. The 13-week accelerator program is for “mission-driven startups that maximize human potential through work, education, and economic mobility solutions.”

In 2024, a Strada report named “Talent Disrupted” found that 52% of recent grads are underemployed, with 45% still so after a decade. First jobs shape long-term success, with STEM majors and internships reducing underemployment. It urges more paid internships, career coaching, and access to high-wage fields.
