= Genspark =

AI-powered search engine

Genspark is an artificial intelligence search engine developed by MainFunc and released in June 2024.

== Overview ==
The platform features a utility to generate "Sparkpages", which compile and summarize information retrieved by the AI regarding a specific search query. These pages can be accessed publicly via URL sharing and are open to further editing by users.

== Genspark Autopilot Agent ==
The Genspark Autopilot Agent is a feature that conducts detailed information searches based on user-submitted text prompts. The agent operates asynchronously, allowing it to process multiple search tasks simultaneously or continue execution after the browser window is closed.
