= Cramer-Krasselt =

- Industry: Marketing communications
- Founded: 1898
- Founder: Fred Cramer; William Krasselt
- Headquarters: Chicago, United States
- Website: c-k.com

Cramer-Krasselt is an American integrated marketing and communications agency. It is the second-largest independent advertising agency in the United States according to Advertising Age in terms of revenue and is probably best known for its ads for Corona Beer, Porsche, Tropicana and Careerbuilder.com.

== Formation and overview ==
The agency was founded in 1898 in Milwaukee by Fred "Cody" Cramer and William Krasselt. They relocated their headquarters to Chicago in the mid-1980s, where it remains as of 2022. Other offices include New York and Milwaukee. The New York Office closed in 2019.

Clients include Cat's Pride, Corona Extra, Cintas, Pacifico Beer, Porsche, Tropicana, and others. In 2011, they took on the $50M account for Cedar Fair, the company that owns Knott's Berry Farm. In 2024 Cedar Fair and Six Flags merged ending the partnership.

In 2018, the agency was named the second most effective independent agency in North America by the Effie organization.
