= Alien Gear Holsters =

American gun holster manufacturer

Alien Gear Holsters is an American holster manufacturer that makes concealed carry holsters used for personal defense. The company started in Arkansas and has since relocated to Post Falls, Idaho in 2016.

== History and development ==
Alien Gear Holsters started when Thomas Tedder couldn't find a handgun holster he genuinely wanted to carry a pistol in, and started to dabble in holster design. Eventually, he found a design that he was willing to concealed carry with, and began producing and selling holsters initially on a small scale. The operation began in his kitchen but eventually moved to his shed per his wife's request. Alien Gear Holsters finally relocated to Hayden, Idaho in 2013. The holster company that began with just a few hundred dollars of leather and plastic, grew to employ hundreds of employees. They consider themselves a "springboard company," wherein they'll promote internally to give people a shot at a better skillset.

Tedder realized that the most potential lay in the hybrid holster design, which mates a hard plastic retention shell molded for the gun it would hold to a backing platform made of a durable cloth such as leather.

Some of the weaknesses he noted in competing products were flimsy materials and poor handgun retention. For instance, several holster companies tell customers to use a heat gun or hair dryer on a holster if it doesn't hold a gun tight enough.

One of the goals of Alien Gear's inception was to address the weaknesses of typical holster design. Whereas the typical hybrid holster with a leather backer would employ an 8-ounce leather, Alien Gear uses a 12-ounce leather backer. Instead of using a thin shell made of thermoplastic acrylic polyvinyl chloride such as Kydex, a thicker shell was devised for greater durability.

Another common feature of Alien Gear's holsters is the use of hex screws and crushable rubber washers to attach the retention shell to the holster. Many competing companies use rivets, which are non-adjustable. Belt clips on the inside-the-waistband holster were also made adjustable so the holster would ride at the height and tilt angle that customers preferred.

Another innovation of Alien Gear was the universal shell system, as the same holster shell can be placed on any backer made by Alien Gear.

== Product evolution ==
=== Cloak Tuck Original and Cloak Slide ===
The initial product offering, the Cloak Tuck, used a leather backer and Boltaron thermoplastic shell. This was followed by the Cloak Slide, an outside the waistband holster using a leather base that rides on the beltline, suitable for open carry.

=== Cloak Tuck 2.0 ===
After the Cloak Slide, the Cloak Tuck 2.0 IWB holster was released in 2014. The 2.0 had an entirely different backing system, being made from multiple layers of material including a closed-cell neoprene back layer, ABS plastic core and vinyl front layer. All three of these products would eventually be offered for a select number of revolvers as well as semi-automatic pistols.

=== Cloak Tuck 3.0 ===
In June 2015, Alien Gear released the Cloak Tuck 3.0, an improved version of the 2.0. The 3.0 featured a similar neoprene backer, but inserted a thin sheet of spring steel in the core of the holster. The 3.0 would garner notice from the NRA and other publications and become a best-seller.

=== Cloak Mod paddle holster ===
Alien Gear launched the Cloak Mod paddle holster in April 2015, a modular OWB holster that could be converted from a paddle holster to a belt slide in a matter of moments. This was quickly followed by the Cloak Dock holster mount, an innovative yet simple mounting bracket that lets the user attach the bracket to compatible surfaces, to which the holster and firearm can be docked.

=== Mag carriers ===
In September 2016, the Cloak Tuck 3.0 for revolvers was released, followed in December 2016 by the Cloak Mag line of magazine carriers and the Cloak Dock IWB holster mount for Alien Gear IWB holsters.

=== ShapeShift modular holster system ===
In January 2017, Alien Gear announced the ShapeShift modular holster system to be released in summer 2017. The ShapeShift is designed to change configuration in moments and be used in nearly any configuration for concealed carry and other uses.

== Design details ==
=== Holster configurations ===
Alien Gear's speciality is the hybrid holster, a holster design made by mounting a hard plastic shell onto a flexible cloth (or other) material. The benefits of this holster design for the person carrying the pistol are greater comfort compared to pancake-style holsters (made from two pieces of a single material such as Kydex/other hard plastic, nylon or leather) along with better fitment and retention in many cases.

Since the hard shell of a hybrid holster is usually press-molded for exactly the make and model firearm that the customer purchases the holster for, fitment is usually exact. Additionally, the holster exerts pressure exactly on the contour of the gun. This better ensures a pistol stays holstered whilst being carried.

The dominant forms of hybrid holster are outside-the-waistband and inside-the-waistband. Alien Gear makes examples of each.

=== Features ===
Alien Gear's holsters share certain features.

All holsters prior to the ShapeShift holster system use a universal holster shell, meaning the same shell can be installed on multiple backing platforms. Most Alien Gear shells are compression molded for the specific make and model firearm the customer orders from sheets of Boltaron, then trimmed to fit and polished. However, select shell models are now being injection-molded for greater durability.

The process produces a "retention bump" inside the shell that protrudes slightly inside the trigger guard. This helps retain the pistol, and produces the tell-tale "click" common to hard plastic holsters when a pistol is placed inside or drawn from one. The shells are attached to the backer by hex screws with crushable washers, so the shell can be adjusted up or down at the owner's discretion. The company also includes multiple sizes of washer for the user to customize their own holster should that be desired.

Inside the waistband holsters made by Alien Gear have adjustable belt clips, which allow the user to set the height the holster rides at inside the waistband, as well as the angle the pistol sits at by moving the belt clip between the weld nut position on the wings of the holster. Belt clips available from the company include standard plastic clips, metal clips, leather loops and also "J" and "C" clips, which tuck under the belt when being worn.

The backing platforms of Alien Gear's Cloak Tuck 3.0 and Cloak Mod holsters both have cores of woven ballistic nylon fabric and spring steel which act as internal stiffeners. Alien Gear's leather belts, intended for use while carrying a pistol and a holster, also uses an internal stiffener of spring steel.

All of Alien Gear's inside the waistband holsters and the Cloak Mod holster are compatible with Alien Gear's Cloak Dock holster mount system, which can be secured to most surfaces such as furniture, drywall or car interiors.

Magazine carriers made by Alien Gear are injection-molded, and are designed to be worn in or outside of the waistband. A unique locking gate allows the user to switch between belt attachments and install a soft backer for inside the waistband use. The locking gate allows carrying position to be adjusted a full 360 degrees.
