= Robert McGovern (businessman) =

American businessperson

Robert McGovern is an American businessperson and entrepreneur, currently the chief executive officer at PreciseTarget. He previously founded and led (as chief executive officer) CareerBuilder and JobFox.

== Career ==
McGovern began his career at Hewlett Packard Company (1983 to 1993), before serving as president and general manager of a division of Legent Corporation (1993 to 1995).

McGovern founded CareerBuilder in 1995 as NetStart Inc. The company went public in 1999 before going private again in 2000 when it was acquired for $200 million by publishers Knight Ridder and the Tribune Company. McGovern continued serving as the company's chief executive officer through 2002, overseeing CareerBuilder's acquisition of Headhunter (in 2001, for $200 million).

In 2004, McGovern founded a second online job site, Jobfox. Jobfox differed from CareerBuilder, which brought the job search process online, by focusing on making it easier for job seekers to find a job.

In June 2009, McGovern was in a car accident and suffered severe brain injury. The Glasgow Coma Scale evaluation indicated (with a score of "3") that he probably would not survive in anything other than a vegetative state. However, he recovered and returned to Jobfox in March 2010, overseeing the sale of the company in two private transactions: selling the assets in 2012 to Beyond.com and the domain name in 2013 to Doostang.

In 2013, McGovern launched Cobrain, which uses a database of consumer preferences to help brands activate customers and sell more products online.

In 2014 the MedStar National Rehabilitation Hospital gave him a Victory Gala Award, honoring individuals who have overcome physical adversity and inspired others.

In 2016, Cobrain was rebranded as PreciseTarget. In July 2019, PreciseTarget launched its first retail data products. The company is based in Bethesda, Md., and as of February 2021 has 20 employees.

He also served as a board member with Heads Up, a Washington D.C. nonprofit that sponsored after-school programs (1999 to 2001), and as a venture partner in the information technology practice of New Enterprise Associates (NEA) (2004 to 2005).

== Publications ==
McGovern is the author of Bring Your A-Game, The 10 Secrets of The Career Achiever (Sourcebooks, 2005) ISBN 1402205163. He holds a total of six patents, focused in the areas of computerized job search and recruitment.
