= Sean James =

American football player (born 1969)

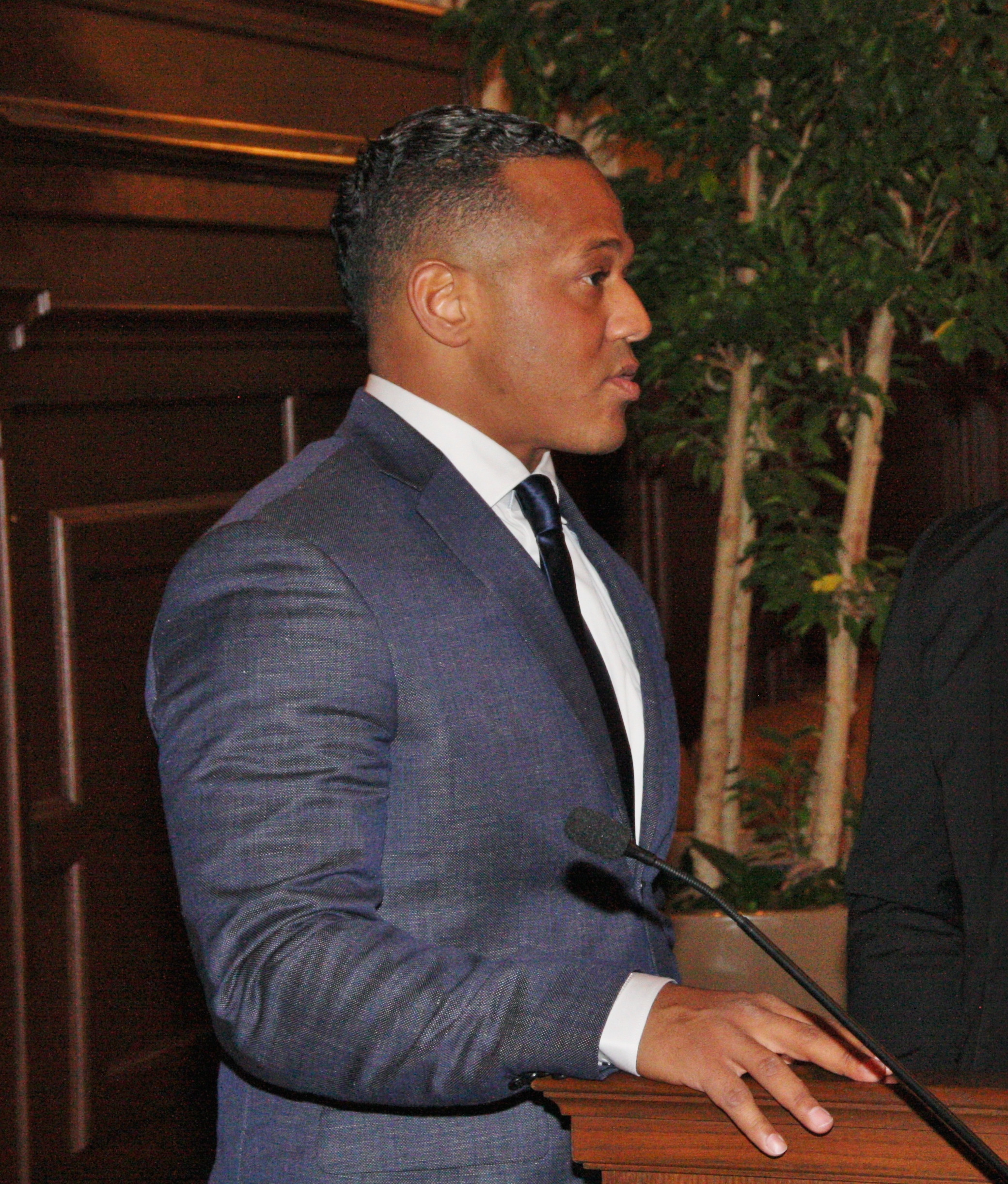
- Sean James speaking at Washington University in St. Louis 2015

Profile
- Position: Running back

Personal information
- Born: March 15, 1969 (age 57); Meridian, Mississippi, U.S.
- Listed height: 5 ft 11 in (1.80 m)
- Listed weight: 214 lb (97 kg)

Career information
- College: Missouri Southern State University
- NFL draft: 1991: undrafted

Career history
- 1991–1992: Minnesota Vikings

Sean James (born March 15, 1969) is an American activist and former football player. He signed as a rookie free agent with the Minnesota Vikings (1991–1992). Sean is the cousin of father and son Major League Baseball players Cecil Fielder and Prince Fielder. In June 2012, James created Be In The Know About Bullying to combat homophobia and bullying.

== Early life ==
James played his high school football at Hutchinson High School in Hutchinson, Kansas. James was a member of the 1986 team that reached the state semifinals, and was awarded All County and All State honors. James was a three-sport letterman in football, basketball and track and field. As one of the state's top high school long jumpers and sprinters, James had the best long jump in the state of Kansas at the 1987 Kansas Relays with a jump of 23 feet 6 1/2 inches (7.176 m).

== Education ==
- The George Washington University – Master of Business Administration (2013)
- Missouri Southern State University – B.A. in Business Administration (1992)

== College career ==
James received his B.A. in Business Administration with a minor in Physical Therapy (Sports Medicine) from Missouri Southern State University, where he was a two-sport athlete. In track and field he was an All Conference sprinter in the 60 metres, 100 metres, and long jump, and had a long jump personal best of 25 feet 3 inches (7.70 m). On NFL pro day, James was able to show his exceptional speed (4.37 seconds in the 40-yard dash) and exceptional jumping ability (41-inch vertical jump) when working out for NFL scouts.

== Modeling career ==
After James' professional football career ended, James went on to sign a contract with the Ford Modeling Agency, appearing in several advertising campaigns, including Hanes, Fubu, Avon Products, and Phat Farm.

== Advocacy ==
In February 2015, there had much controversy and discussion about the problems that exist between police departments of urban communities and their citizens. Gateway, a program created by James is aptly named as it creates an opening for communication and healing between the Police Department of St. Louis, Missouri, and its urban youth. The goal of the program is to take the sense of belonging to ones' community, and transform it into tangible relationships that we help to cultivate by focusing on the four principals of guidance, access, tolerance, and education, Gateway redefines the urban experience through a singular purpose and a shared responsibility.

In February 2010, Al Joyner and James appeared in a Planned Parenthood anticipatory response message to a controversial Focus on the Family anti-abortion Super Bowl commercial starring Tim Tebow and his mother.

== Philanthropy ==
In 2007 James founded and is the president of Sean James Student Athletes (SJSA), a nonprofit organization in New York City. SJSA provides scholarships for underprivileged youth. In 2012 James founded Be In The Know About Bullying organization. Be In The Know is an anti-bullying program centered on the philosophy that students can make a meaningful impact on preventing bullying in their schools through leadership, education, and the use of meaningful mentors. The purpose of this organization is to increase awareness of our organization in local communities and share vital information about bullying in order to spark interest and momentum in our fight to end bullying. By bringing together important community figures from different walks of life, and NFL Players we can facilitate networking and cross promotion to increase awareness and foster programs to combat bullying within our local communities.

== Television correspondent ==
On October 23, 2013, James appeared on CBS The Couch to talk about his first national campaign Pro Athletes Lend Their Voices to Anti-Bullying Movement The Former NFL player Sean James produced a PSA on the campaign, called ‘Be In The Know About Bullying.’

In November 2013 James spoke about the culture and behavior in NFL locker rooms In the wake of Richie Incognito's suspension from the Dolphins amid allegations that he bullied Jonathan Martin New York Times

James in October 2014 became a correspondent expert for PIX 11 tackling social issues in sports and business Experts gauge the future of Sayreville HS football players Dr. Leah Lagos, a sports psychologist, former NFL player Sean James joined us in a panel discussion on the fate and future of the football program, the school and its students.

In 2019 James has appeared on Fox & Friends sharing his insight with game predictions and social issues in the NFL. Browns player suspended indefinitely for helmet swing at Steelers quarterback
