= CareerBuilder =

Employment website

- Website type: Job search engine
- Available in: Multilingual
- Headquarters: Guaynabo, Puerto Rico, PR
- Owner: BOLD www.bold.com
- Key people: Doug Jackson (co-CEO), Jamie Freundlich (co-CEO)
- Website: www.careerbuilder.com
- Commercial: Yes
- Registration: Optional
- Launched: 1995

CareerBuilder is an American employment website founded in 1995 that operates in the United States, Europe, and Asia. CareerBuilder provides a job search engine, talent management software, and other recruitment-related services. The company is owned by BOLD Holdings.

== History ==
CareerBuilder was founded by Robert J. McGovern in 1995 under the name NetStart Inc.

In 1996, Netstart raised $2 million in investment.

In 1998, NetStart Inc. changed its name to CareerBuilder and raised another $7 million in funding.

In 1999, the company's IPO raised $8 million more than initially forecasted, but was less successful than other Net offerings of the time. In its first day of trading, the company's shares opened at $17.50 and rose as high as $20.00 before closing at $16.00. Microsoft acquired a minority stake in the company in exchange for using the company's database on their own web portal.

In July 2000, the company was purchased in a joint venture by Knight Ridder and Tribune Company for $8 a share. CareerBuilder acquired competitors CareerPath.com and later Headhunter.net which had already acquired CareerMosaic.

In 2001, major newspapers owned by Knight Ridder and the Tribune Company merged their help wanted sections with the online component.

In March 2002, Robert McGovern was replaced as CEO of the company by Robert Montgomery. Gannett purchased a one-third interest in the company for $98.3 million in 2002, adding the CareerBuilder brand to its 90 newspapers nationwide. The company suffered major difficulty because of the dot com crash and nearly went bankrupt.

The McClatchy Company purchased Knight Ridder for $4.5 billion in stock and cash in March 2006. In May 2006, according to two consumer complaints received by the office of Illinois Attorney General, Lisa Madigan, and reports from other states, scam artists have been contacting job hunters through CareerBuilder.com regarding a "Donations Handler" position with an international charity, also known as a pigeon drop: the "handler" accepts checks sent in the mail from Peachtree Corners, Georgia and is required to wire transfer the amount to an international account within 24 hours, but the checks are later discovered to be fraudulent. Victims reported losing between $500 and $2,000 in this scheme.

In 2008, it had the largest market share among online employment websites in the United States. In December 2008, the company announced layoffs affecting approximately 300 employees.

In 2011, CareerBuilder acquired JobsCentral in Singapore and JobScout24 in Germany.

In September 2012, the company acquired Economic Modeling Specialists Intl. (EMSI), an economic modeling software firm based in Moscow, Idaho. EMSI was sold to Strada Education Network in April 2018.

In 2014, CareerBuilder acquired the recruiting technology company Broadbean in the U.K.

In 2016, CareerBuilder and Capella University launched the RightSkill program. The company also expanded into background screening with the acquisition of Aurico and post-hire software with the acquisition of WORKTERRA.

In June 2017, CareerBuilder was purchased by the private-equity firm Apollo Global Management and the Ontario Teachers’ Pension Plan Board. In September that year, CareerBuilder laid off 120 employees. Irina Novoselsky was appointed as CEO in October 2017, and in July 2021, was replaced as CEO by Sue Arthur from Optum.

In September 2024, Monster.com merged with CareerBuilder, and funds managed by Apollo Global Management became the majority owner of the websites.

On June 24, 2025, CareerBuilder + Monster filed for Chapter 11 bankruptcy protection in an effort to facilitate a sale of its job board operations to JobGet. The company's software services business for federal and state governments are to be sold to Canadian software company Valsoft, while military.com and fastweb.com are to be sold to Canadian media company Valnet. The company listed assets between $50 million and $100 million, and liabilities between $100 million and $500 million.

However, In July/August 2025, BOLD won the final bid of $28.4 M. The BOLD portfolio features some of the world's most trusted career-focused brands and job search sites, including MyPerfectResume (the largest resume builder platform), FlexJobs (remote jobs site with vetted, scam-free opportunities), Bold.pro (professional identity and networking), LiveCareer (AI resume builder and career guidance), and Zety (resume templates, formats and help).

== See also ==
- Employment website
